= 2001 All-Big 12 Conference football team =

The 2001 All-Big 12 Conference football team consists of American football players chosen as All-Big 12 Conference players for the 2001 NCAA Division I-A football season. The conference recognizes two official All-Big 12 selectors: (1) the Big 12 conference coaches selected separate offensive and defensive units and named first- and second-team players (the "Coaches" team); and (2) a panel of sports writers and broadcasters covering the Big 12 also selected offensive and defensive units and named first- and second-team players (the "Media" team).

== Offensive selections ==
=== Quarterbacks ===
- Eric Crouch, Nebraska (Coaches-1; Media-1)
- Kliff Kingsbury, Texas Tech (Coaches-2; Media-2)

=== Running backs ===
- Cortlen Johnson, Colorado (Coaches-1)
- Ennis Haywood, Iowa State (Coaches-1; Media-1)
- Dahrran Diedrick, Nebraska (Coaches-2; Media-1)
- Ricky Williams, Texas Tech (Coaches-1; Media-2)
- Josh Scobey, Kansas State (Coaches-2; Media-2)

=== Centers ===
- Seth McKinney, Texas A&M (Coaches-1; Media-1)
- Wayne Lucier, Colorado (Media-2)
- Justin Hartwig, Kansas (Coaches-2)

=== Guards ===
- Toniu Fonoti, Nebraska (Coaches-1; Media-1)
- Andre Gurode, Colorado (Coaches-1; Media-1)
- Rex Richards, Texas Tech (Coaches-2; Media-2)
- Greg Jerman, Baylor (Coaches-2)
- Marcel Howard, Iowa State (Media-2)

=== Tackles ===
- Frank Romero, Oklahoma (Coaches-1; Media-1)
- Mike Williams, Texas (Coaches-1; Media-1)
- Victor Rogers, Colorado (Media-2)
- Dave Volk, Nebraska (Coaches-2; Media-2)
- Aaron Crittendon, Missouri (Coaches-2)

=== Tight ends ===
- Daniel Graham, Colorado (Coaches-1; Media-1)
- Trent Smith, Oklahoma (Coaches-2; Media-2)

=== Receivers ===
- Justin Gage, Missouri (Coaches-1; Media-1)
- Roy Williams, Texas (Coaches-1; Media-1)
- Reggie Newhouse, Baylor (Media-2)
- Antwone Savage, Oklahoma (Coaches-2)
- Rashaun Woods, Oklahoma State (Coaches-2; Media-2)

== Defensive selections ==
=== Defensive linemen ===
- Tommie Harris, Oklahoma (Coaches-1; Media-1)
- Cory Redding, Texas (Coaches-1; Media-1)
- Jimmy Wilkerson, Oklahoma (Coaches-1; Media-1)
- Justin Bannan, Colorado (Coaches-1; Media-2)
- Nate Dwyer, Kansas (Coaches-1; Media-2)
- Aaron Hunt, Texas Tech (Coaches-2; Media-1)
- Chris Kelsay, Nebraska (Coaches-2; Media-2)
- Cory Heinecke, Oklahoma (Coaches-2)
- Kory Klein, Oklahoma (Coaches-2)
- Tank Reese, Kansas State (Coaches-2)
- Keith Wright, Missouri (Coaches-2)
- Rocky Bernard, Texas A&M (Media-2)

=== Linebackers ===
- Rocky Calmus, Oklahoma (Coaches-1; Media-1)
- Ben Leber, Kansas State (Coaches-1; Media-1)
- Lawrence Flugence, Texas Tech (Coaches-2; Media-1)
- D.D. Lewis, Texas (Coaches-2; Media-1)
- Jamie Burrow, Nebraska (Media-2)
- Dwayne Levels, Oklahoma State (Media-2)
- Jarrod Penright, Texas A&M (Media-2)
- Jamonte Robinson, Missouri (Media-2)

=== Defensive backs ===
- Quentin Jammer, Texas (Coaches-1; Media-1)
- Keyuo Craver, Nebraska (Coaches-1; Media-1)
- Roy Williams, Oklahoma (Coaches-1; Media-1)
- Michael Lewis, Colorado (Coaches-1; Media-1)
- Sammy Davis, Texas A&M (Coaches-1; Media-2)
- Kevin Curtis, Texas Tech (Coaches-2; Media-2)
- Nathan Vasher, Texas (Coaches-2; Media-2)
- Brandon Everage, Oklahoma (Coaches-2)
- Terence Newman, Kansas State (Coaches-2)
- Derrick Strait, Oklahoma (Media-2)

== Special teams ==
=== Kickers ===
- Jeremy Flores, Colorado (Coaches-1; Media-1)
- Luke Phillips, Oklahoma State (Coaches-2; Media-2)

=== Punters ===
- Jeff Ferguson, Oklahoma (Coaches-1; Media-1)
- Adam Stiles, Baylor (Coaches-2; Media-2)

=== All-purpose / Return specialists ===
- Roman Hollowell, Colorado (Coaches-1; Media-2)
- Ricky Williams, Texas Tech (Media-1)
- Chris Massey, Oklahoma State (Coaches-1)
- Nathan Vasher, Texas (Coaches-2)
- Aaron Lockett, Kansas State (Coaches-2)

== Key ==
Bold = selected as a first-team player by both the coaches and media panel

Coaches = selected by Big 12 Conference coaches

Media = selected by a media panel

== See also ==
- 2001 College Football All-America Team
