= 2009 Seattle Seahawks season =

American football team season

- Owner: Paul Allen
- General manager: Tim Ruskell
- Head coach: Jim L. Mora
- Home stadium: Qwest Field

Results
- Record: 5–11
- Division place: 3rd NFC West
- Playoffs: Did not qualify
- All-Pros: None
- Pro Bowlers: None

The 2009 Seattle Seahawks season was the franchise's 34th season in the National Football League (NFL), the 8th playing their home games at Qwest Field and the first and only season under head coach Jim Mora. The Seahawks slightly improved from their 4–12 record and a third-place finish in what was Mike Holmgren's final season coaching the team in 2008 and finished with a 5–11 record. However, Mora was fired January 8, 2010.

== Offseason ==
=== Staff changes ===
With Jim Mora we are getting a smart, passionate, committed coach to winning and building a successful franchise.

— General Manager Tim Ruskell on hiring Jim Mora as head coach.

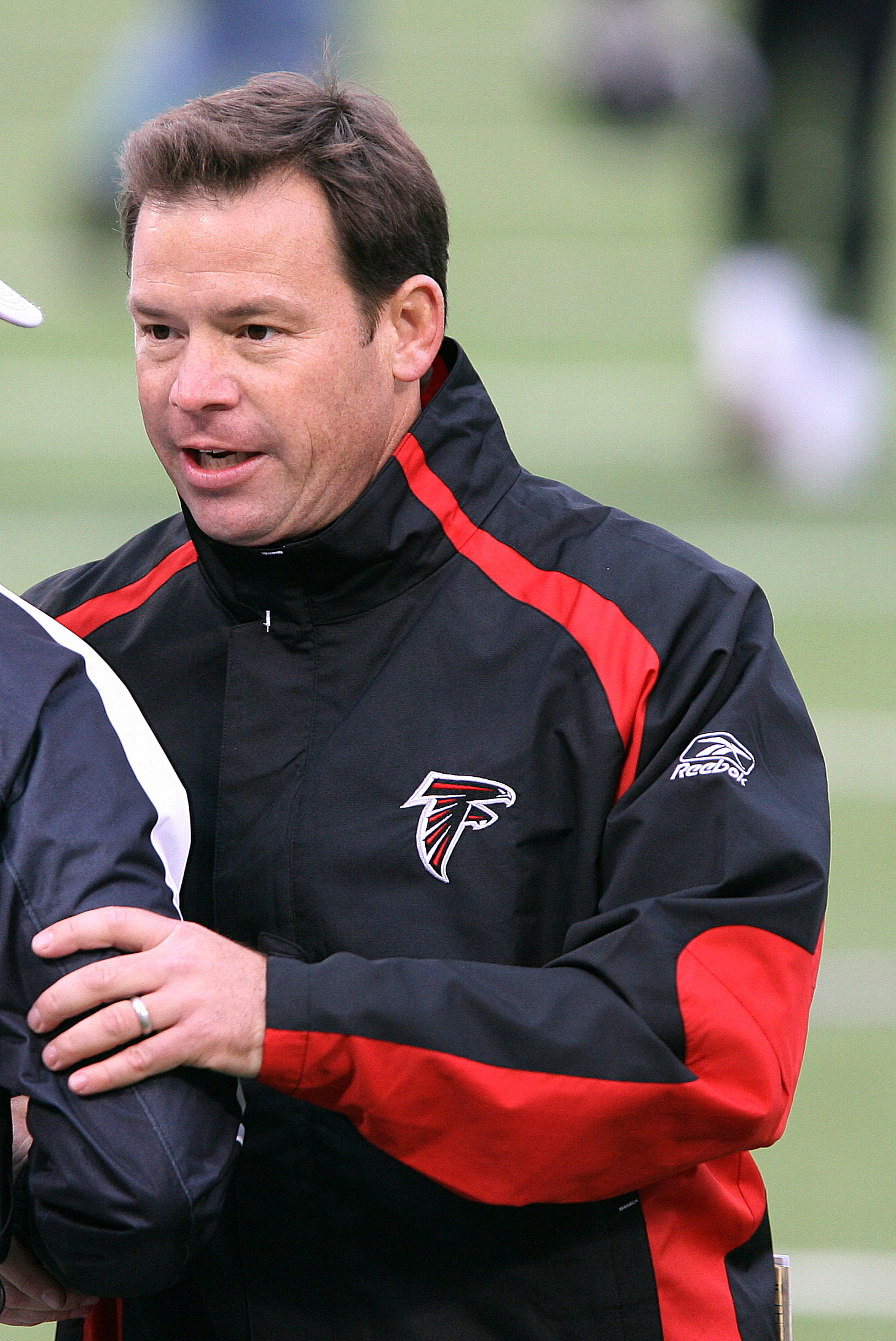
Jim Mora (shown here with the Atlanta Falcons)

At the beginning of the 2008 season, head coach Mike Holmgren had stated that 2008 was his final season before retiring. On December 30, 2008, two days after the season ended, Holmgren officially retired and stepped down as head coach. Jim Mora, the team's assistant head coach and defensive backs coach, was officially selected as his replacement on January 13, 2009. The retirement and Jim Mora's accession had been originally announced on January 22, 2008.

Mora then began to replace most of the staff that Holmgren had last year. Defensive coordinator John Marshall and defensive line coach Dwaine Board were both fired on January 12, 2009. Subsequently, former Tampa Bay Buccaneers linebackers coach Gus Bradley was hired as the new defensive coordinator. Also, former New York Jets assistant Dan Quinn replaced Board as the defensive line coach and as the new assistant head coach.

The offensive side was also revamped as well. Offensive coordinator Gil Haskell was dismissed after 8 years with the Seahawks. Former Oakland Raiders offensive coordinator Greg Knapp, who had previously worked with Mora when he was the head coach of the Atlanta Falcons, was hired as his replacement on January 14, 2009. Mora also fired wide receivers coach Keith Gilbertson and was replaced with former Jacksonville Jaguars assistant receivers coach Robert Prince. Finally, tight ends coach Jim Lind and special teams assistant John Jamison both retired after the 2008 season. Mike DeBord, formerly the offensive line assistant coach, replaced Lind although no replacement has been named for Jamison.

=== Key departures ===
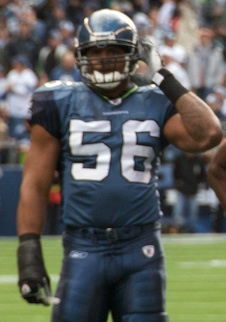
Linebacker Leroy Hill

Running back Maurice Morris, who backed up starter Julius Jones last season, signed with the Detroit Lions. The Seahawks also lost defensive tackle Rocky Bernard to the New York Giants. Fan favorite Bobby Engram was released and signed with the Kansas City Chiefs after the Seahawks signed wide receiver T. J. Houshmandzadeh. The Seahawks were also in talks with fullback Leonard Weaver about a new contract, but ultimately he signed with the Philadelphia Eagles instead. Also, the Seahawks traded away Pro Bowl linebacker Julian Peterson to the Lions. In all, the Seahawks lost a total of 14 players to free agency.

Linebacker Leroy Hill was placed under the franchise tag on February 19, 2009. However, discussions for a long-term deal between Hill and the Seahawks were slow, and they continued to stall up to the draft. In an effort to speed up negotiations, the Seahawks removed their franchise tag on Hill less than 24 hours within the first draft day, thereby releasing him to free agency and allowing him to sign with other teams. However, on April 30, 2009, Hill agreed to a six-year, 38 million-dollar deal with the Seahawks.

Moments after signing Edgerrin James to a one-year deal, the Seahawks released running back T. J. Duckett to make room on their roster. Duckett had led the team in rushing touchdowns the previous year.

Safety Brian Russell was also released on September 5, 2009. Russell had started at safety for the Seahawks since coming in at the start of the 2007 season. Strong safety Lawyer Milloy was signed after Russell's departure to fill his spot (along with Jordan Babineaux).

=== Key additions ===
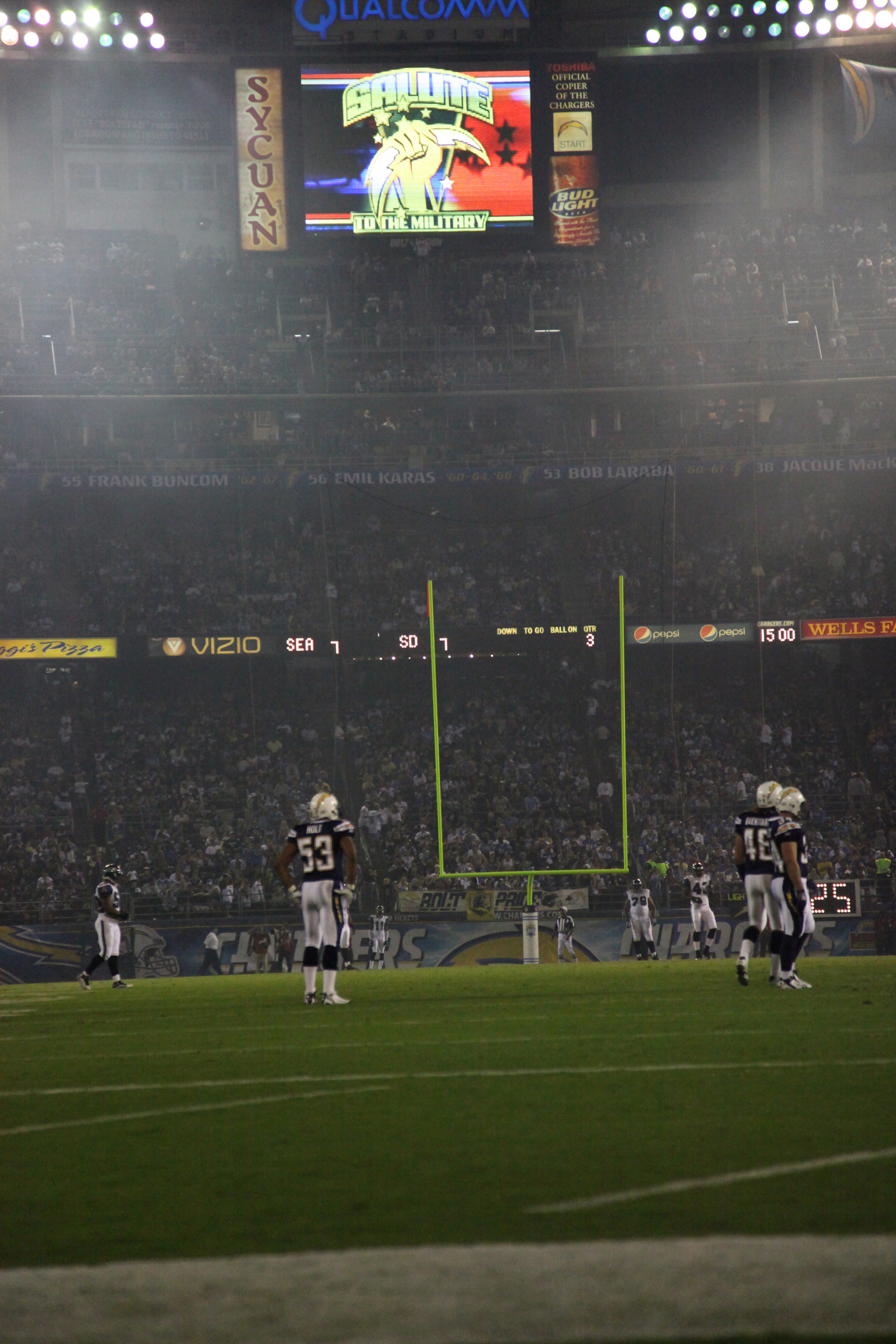
Seattle at San Diego in the preseason, August 15, 2009

The Seahawks made big splashes during the offseason as well. On March 1, Seattle signed defensive tackle Colin Cole from the Green Bay Packers to a 5-year contract to address problems on their defensive line. They also received defensive tackle Cory Redding and a fifth round pick in exchange for the Peterson trade mentioned above.

Perhaps the biggest move in free agency, however, was the signing of former Pro Bowl wide receiver T. J. Houshmandzadeh from the Cincinnati Bengals to a 5-year, $40 million deal with $15 million guaranteed two days after signing Cole. Houshmandzadeh was rated as one of the top free agents available.

After rescinding their franchise tag on Hill, the Seahawks signed former Carolina Panthers corner back Ken Lucas to a one-year deal in order to bolster their pass coverage. They also signed fullback Justin Griffith from the Oakland Raiders to address the departure of Weaver. It was known that releasing of Hill created some flexibility on the salary cap of where these two deals go into play.

On August 25, 2009, the Seahawks signed running back Edgerrin James to a 1-year, $2 million deal. James last played with division rival Arizona Cardinals for the previous three seasons and played a vital role in their playoff run last year. The Seahawks also signed veteran safety Lawyer Milloy to a one-year deal, who is expected to make a big impact to the team.

=== 2009 NFL draft ===
2009 Seattle Seahawks draft
| Round | Selection | Player | Position | College | Notes |
|---|---|---|---|---|---|
| 1 | 4 | Aaron Curry | LB | Wake Forest | |
| 2 | 49 | Max Unger | G/C | Oregon | (from Chicago) |
| 3 | 91 | Deon Butler | WR | Penn State | (from Philadelphia through New York) |
| 6 | 178 | Mike Teel | QB | Rutgers | |
| 7 | 245 | Courtney Greene | S | Rutgers | |
| 7 | 247 | Nick Reed | DE | Oregon | |
| 7 | 248 | Cameron Morrah | TE | California | |

Seattle traded their 5th round draft pick to the Denver Broncos for wide receiver Keary Colbert, but received another 5th round draft pick from Detroit.

On draft day, the Seahawks traded away their 2nd round pick (37th overall) to the Denver Broncos for their 2010 1st round pick. They also traded for Chicago's 2nd round pick (49th overall) in return for both their 3rd and 4th round picks in the draft (68th and 105th respectively). Finally, the Seahawks traded for Philadelphia's 3rd round pick (91st overall) for their 2010 3rd round pick and their 5th and 7th round picks in the draft (137th and 213th respectively).

== Coaching staff and roster ==
=== Coaching staff ===
2009 Seattle Seahawks staff
| **Front office**: Owner/chairman – Paul Allen; President/CEO – Tod Leiweke; President of football operations/general manager – Tim Ruskell; Vice president of player personnel – Ruston Webster; Vice president of football administration – John Idzik; Director of pro personnel – Will Lewis; Western region director of college scouting – Scott Fitterer; Eastern region director of college scouting – Mike Yowarsky; **Head coaches**: Head coach – Jim Mora; Assistant head coach/defensive line – Dan Quinn; **Offensive coaches**: Offensive coordinator – Greg Knapp; Quarterbacks – Bill Lazor; Running backs – Kasey Dunn; Wide receivers – Robert Prince; Tight ends – Mike DeBord; Offensive line – Mike Solari; Offensive assistant/assistant special teams – Chris Beake | **Defensive coaches**: Defensive coordinator – Gus Bradley; Assistant defensive line – Mike Phair; Linebackers – Zerick Rollins; Defensive backs – Tim Lewis; Assistant defensive backs – Larry Marmie; Defensive quality control – Tom Headlee; **Special teams coaches**: Special teams – Bruce DeHaven; **Strength and conditioning**: Head strength and conditioning – Mike Clark; Assistant strength and conditioning – Darren Krein |

=== Final roster ===
2009 Seattle Seahawks roster
| **Quarterbacks (QB)**: **8** Matt Hasselbeck; 14 Mike Teel; 15 Seneca Wallace; **Running backs (RB)**: 20 Justin Forsett; **33** Justin Griffith; **22** Julius Jones; 40 Louis Rankin; 35 Owen Schmitt; **Wide receivers (WR)**: 83 Deion Branch; **81** Nate Burleson; 11 Deon Butler; **84** T. J. Houshmandzadeh; 87 Ben Obomanu; **Tight ends (TE)**: **89** John Carlson; 88 Cameron Morrah; 86 John Owens | **Offensive linemen (OL)**: 63 Trevor Canfield G; 64 Mike Gibson G; **75** Sean Locklear T; 77 Damion McIntosh T; **67** Rob Sims G; **65** Chris Spencer C/G; **60** Max Unger G/C; 69 Steve Vallos C/G; **74** Ray Willis T; 66 Mansfield Wrotto G; **Defensive linemen (DL)**: 79 Red Bryant DT; **90** Colin Cole DT; **95** Lawrence Jackson DE; **97** Patrick Kerney DE; **92** Brandon Mebane DT; 94 Cory Redding DE; 98 Nick Reed DE; 55 Darryl Tapp DE; 93 Craig Terrill DT | **Linebackers (LB)**: **59** Aaron Curry OLB; **57** David Hawthorne MLB; 54 Will Herring OLB; **56** Leroy Hill OLB; 50 Lance Laury OLB; 52 D. D. Lewis MLB; **Defensive backs (DB)**: 25 Jamar Adams SS; **27** Jordan Babineaux FS; **24** Deon Grant SS; 21 Kelly Jennings CB; 34 Roy Lewis CB; 31 Ken Lucas CB; 36 Lawyer Milloy FS; **23** Marcus Trufant CB; **26** Josh Wilson CB; **Special teams (ST)**: 10 Olindo Mare K; 49 Jeff Robinson LS; 9 Jon Ryan P | **Practice squad**: 16 Patrick Carter WR; 91 Marlon Favorite DT; 70 Na'Shan Goddard T; 53 Anthony Heygood LB; 19 Michael Jones WR; 39 Xavier Omon RB; 47 Jason Pociask TE; 78 Kyle Williams T (IR); 41 DeAngelo Willingham S; **Reserve**: 77 Brandon Frye T (IR); 18 Mike Hass WR (IR); 45 Kevin Houser LS (IR); 71 Walter Jones T (IR); 99 Brandon Miller DE (IR); -- Tyler Roehl FB (IR); 51 Lofa Tatupu LB (IR); Rookies in italics 53 active, 8 reserve, 8 practice squad |

- Starters in bold.

=== Team captains ===
- Matt Hasselbeck
- Walter Jones
- Lofa Tatupu
- Deon Grant
- Lance Laury
- Olindo Mare

== Schedule ==
=== Preseason ===
| Week | Date | Opponent | Result | Record | Game site | Recap |
|---|---|---|---|---|---|---|
| 1 | August 15 | at San Diego Chargers | **W** 20–14 | 1–0 | Qualcomm Stadium | Recap |
| 2 | August 22 | Denver Broncos | **W** 27–13 | 2–0 | Qwest Field | Recap |
| 3 | August 29 | at Kansas City Chiefs | **W** 14–10 | 3–0 | Arrowhead Stadium | Recap |
| 4 | September 3 | Oakland Raiders | **W** 31–21 | 4–0 | Qwest Field | Recap |

=== Regular season ===
Divisional matchups: the NFC West played the NFC North and the AFC South.

| Week | Date | Opponent | Result | Record | Game site | Recap |
|---|---|---|---|---|---|---|
| 1 | September 13 | **St. Louis Rams** | **W** 28–0 | 1–0 | Qwest Field | Recap |
| 2 | September 20 | at **San Francisco 49ers** | **L** 10–23 | 1–1 | Candlestick Park | Recap |
| 3 | September 27 | Chicago Bears | **L** 19–25 | 1–2 | Qwest Field | Recap |
| 4 | October 4 | at Indianapolis Colts | **L** 17–34 | 1–3 | Lucas Oil Stadium | Recap |
| 5 | October 11 | Jacksonville Jaguars | **W** 41–0 | 2–3 | Qwest Field | Recap |
| 6 | October 18 | **Arizona Cardinals** | **L** 3–27 | 2–4 | Qwest Field | Recap |
| 7 | Bye | | | | | |
| 8 | November 1 | at Dallas Cowboys | **L** 17–38 | 2–5 | Cowboys Stadium | Recap |
| 9 | November 8 | Detroit Lions | **W** 32–20 | 3–5 | Qwest Field | Recap |
| 10 | November 15 | at **Arizona Cardinals** | **L** 20–31 | 3–6 | University of Phoenix Stadium | Recap |
| 11 | November 22 | at Minnesota Vikings | **L** 9–35 | 3–7 | Mall of America Field | Recap |
| 12 | November 29 | at **St. Louis Rams** | **W** 27–17 | 4–7 | Edward Jones Dome | Recap |
| 13 | December 6 | **San Francisco 49ers** | **W** 20–17 | 5–7 | Qwest Field | Recap |
| 14 | December 13 | at Houston Texans | **L** 7–34 | 5–8 | Reliant Stadium | Recap |
| 15 | December 20 | Tampa Bay Buccaneers | **L** 7–24 | 5–9 | Qwest Field | Recap |
| 16 | December 27 | at Green Bay Packers | **L** 10–48 | 5–10 | Lambeau Field | Recap |
| 17 | January 3, 2010 | Tennessee Titans | **L** 13–17 | 5–11 | Qwest Field | Recap |

Bold indicates division opponents.

== Standings ==
NFC West
| | W | L | T | PCT | DIV | CONF | PF | PA | STK |
|---|---|---|---|---|---|---|---|---|---|
| ^{(4)} Arizona Cardinals | 10 | 6 | 0 | .625 | 4–2 | 8–4 | 375 | 325 | L1 |
| San Francisco 49ers | 8 | 8 | 0 | .500 | 5–1 | 7–5 | 330 | 281 | W2 |
| Seattle Seahawks | 5 | 11 | 0 | .313 | 3–3 | 4–8 | 280 | 390 | L4 |
| St. Louis Rams | 1 | 15 | 0 | .063 | 0–6 | 1–11 | 175 | 436 | L8 |

== Game summaries ==
=== Preseason ===
==== Week P1: at San Diego Chargers ====
Preseason Week One: Seattle Seahawks at San Diego Chargers – Game summary

| Quarter | 1 | 2 | 3 | 4 | Total |
|---|---|---|---|---|---|
| Seahawks | 0 | 7 | 7 | 6 | 20 |
| Chargers | 0 | 7 | 0 | 7 | 14 |

at Qualcomm Stadium, San Diego, California

- Date: August 15
- Game time: 7:00pm local
- Game weather: clear, 69 °F (21 °C), 73% humidity, wind WSW 8 miles per hour (13 km/h)
- Game attendance: 58,373
- Referee: Don Carey
- TV: KING
- Gamecenter, Gamebook

==== Week P2: vs. Denver Broncos ====
Preseason Week Two: Seattle Seahawks vs. Denver Broncos – Game summary

| Quarter | 1 | 2 | 3 | 4 | Total |
|---|---|---|---|---|---|
| Broncos | 10 | 0 | 0 | 3 | 13 |
| Seahawks | 7 | 7 | 13 | 0 | 27 |

at Seahawks Stadium, Seattle

- Date: August 22
- Game time: 7:36pm local
- Game weather: clear, 69 °F (21 °C), 41% humidity, wind NNW 6 miles per hour (9.7 km/h)
- Game attendance: 67,052
- Referee: Tony Corrente
- TV: KING
- Gamecenter, Gamebook

==== Week P3: at Kansas City Chiefs ====
Preseason Week Three: Seattle Seahawks at Kansas City Chiefs – Game summary

| Quarter | 1 | 2 | 3 | 4 | Total |
|---|---|---|---|---|---|
| Seahawks | 0 | 7 | 7 | 0 | 14 |
| Chiefs | 7 | 0 | 0 | 3 | 10 |

at Arrowhead Stadium, Kansas City, Missouri

- Date: August 29
- Game time: 9:58pm local
- Game weather: clear, 73 °F (23 °C), 53% humidity, wind N 10 miles per hour (16 km/h)
- Game attendance: 66,553
- Referee: Pete Morelli
- TV: KING
- Gamecenter, Gamebook

==== Week P4: vs. Oakland Raiders ====
Preseason Week Four: Seattle Seahawks vs. Oakland Raiders – Game summary

| Quarter | 1 | 2 | 3 | 4 | Total |
|---|---|---|---|---|---|
| Raiders | 7 | 0 | 0 | 14 | 21 |
| Seahawks | 7 | 10 | 14 | 0 | 31 |

at Qwest Field, Seattle

- Date: September 3
- Game time: 7:06pm local
- Game weather: clear, 72 °F (22 °C), 46% humidity, wind SW 6 miles per hour (9.7 km/h)
- Game attendance: 66,697
- Referee: Ed Hochuli
- TV: KING
- Gamecenter, Gamebook

=== Regular season ===
==== Week 1: vs. St. Louis Rams ====
Week One: Seattle Seahawks vs. St. Louis Rams – Game summary

| Quarter | 1 | 2 | 3 | 4 | Total |
|---|---|---|---|---|---|
| Rams | 0 | 0 | 0 | 0 | 0 |
| Seahawks | 0 | 14 | 14 | 0 | 28 |

at Qwest Field, Seattle

- Date: September 13
- Game time: 1:16pm local
- Game weather: clear, 73 °F (23 °C), 55% humidity, wind NW 5 miles per hour (8.0 km/h)
- Game attendance: 67,610
- Referee: Pete Morelli
- TV announcers (Fox): Ron Pitts, John Lynch, & Rob Desir
- Gamecenter, Gamebook

Game information

First quarter

- No scoring plays.

Second quarter

- SEA – John Carlson 1-yard pass from Matt Hasselbeck (Olindo Mare kick), 5:45. Seahawks 7–0. Drive: 13 plays, 73 yards, 6:15.
- SEA – Nate Burleson 12-yard pass from Matt Hasselbeck (Olindo Mare kick), 0:12. Seahawks 14–0. Drive: 12 plays, 69 yards, 3:55.

Third quarter

- SEA – John Carlson 33-yard pass from Matt Hasselbeck (Olindo Mare kick), 5:02. Seahawks 21–0. Drive: 7 plays, 99 yards, 3:55.
- SEA – Julius Jones 62-yard run (Olindo Mare kick), 3:42. Seahawks 28–0. Drive: 1 play, 62 yards, 0:10.

Fourth quarter

- No scoring plays.

Top passers

- STL – Marc Bulger: 17/36, 191 yds
- SEA – Matt Hasselbeck: 25/36, 279 yds, 3 TD, 2 INT

Top rushers

- STL – Steven Jackson: 16 car, 67 yds
- SEA – Julius Jones: 19 car, 117 yds

Top receivers

- STL – Laurent Robinson: 5 rec, 87 yds
- SEA – John Carlson: 6 rec, 95 yds, 2 TD

Team – pass – rush – total – to

- STL – 170 – 77 – 247 – 1
- SEA – 279 – 167 – 446 – 3

Head Coach Jim Mora era began his coaching debut for the Seahawks with a game at home against division rival St. Louis Rams. Quarterback Matt Hasselbeck and the offense struggled early, turning over the ball three times (two interceptions and one fumble) on the first quarter alone. After Rams kicker Olindo Mare missed a 37-yard field goal for the lead, Hasselbeck led the Seahawks to their first score of the game after he connected with tight end John Carlson for a touchdown. With the second quarter coming to a close, St. Louis returned a blocked field goal for a touchdown, only to have it overruled by a penalty. This gave another chance for the Seahawks to score, as Hasselbeck threw his second touchdown of the game to Nate Burleson to put the Seahawks up 14–0 by halftime.

When the third quarter started, the Seahawks looked to increase its lead to win the game. Hasselbeck led the Seahawks to a 99-yard drive, capping it off 33-yard touchdown pass to Carlson. Julius Jones sealed the win with a 62-yard touchdown (and rushing 119 in total) run to put Seattle up by 28. The Seahawks defense shut out the Rams, as they totaled only 247 total yards on offense and forcing two fumbles and three sacks. Seattle moved to 1–0 to start off the season, and beat the Rams for the ninth straight time.

==== Week 2: at San Francisco 49ers ====
Week Two: Seattle Seahawks at San Francisco 49ers – Game summary

| Quarter | 1 | 2 | 3 | 4 | Total |
|---|---|---|---|---|---|
| Seahawks | 0 | 10 | 0 | 0 | 10 |
| 49ers | 10 | 3 | 7 | 3 | 23 |

at Candlestick Park, San Francisco

- Date: September 20
- Game time: 1:05pm local
- Game weather: clear, 68 °F (20 °C), 70% humidity, wind calm
- Game attendance: 69,732
- Referee: Bill Leavy
- TV announcers (Fox): Thom Brennaman & Brian Billick
- Gamecenter, Gamebook

Game information

First quarter

- SF – Joe Nedney 37-yard field goal, 5:38. 49ers 3–0. Drive: 13 plays, 55 yards, 8:07.
- SF – Frank Gore 79-yard run (Joe Nedney kick), 2:36. 49ers 10–0. Drive: 1 play, 79 yards, 0:12.

Second quarter

- SEA – Olindo Mare 36-yard field goal, 10:04. 49ers 10–3. Drive: 10 plays, 52 yards, 4:45.
- SF – Joe Nedney 42-yard field goal, 2:57. 49ers 13–3. Drive: 5 plays, 18 yards, 2:09.
- SEA – Julius Jones 1-yard pass from Seneca Wallace (Olindo Mare kick), 0:22. 49ers 13–10. Drive: 11 plays, 70 yards, 2:35.

Third quarter

- SF – Frank Gore 80-yard run (Joe Nedney kick), 14:49. 49ers 20–10. Drive: 1 play, 80 yards, 0:11.

Fourth quarter

- SF – Joe Nedney 39-yard field goal, 6:53. 49ers 23–10. Drive: 16 plays, 67 yards, 9:27.

Top passers

- SEA – Seneca Wallace: 15/23, 127 yds, 1 TD, 1 INT
- SF – Shaun Hill: 19/26, 144 yds

Top rushers

- SEA – Justin Forsett: 5 car, 35 yds
- SF – Frank Gore: 16 car, 207 yds

Top receivers

- SEA – T. J. Houshmandzadeh: 4 rec, 62 yds
- SF – Frank Gore: 5 rec, 39 yds

Team – pass – rush – total – to

- SEA – 217 – 66 – 283 – 1
- SF – 123 – 256 – 379 – 0

Coming off their shutout home win over the Rams, the Seahawks flew to Candlestick Park for a Week 2 NFC West showdown with the San Francisco 49ers.

Seattle trailed early in the first quarter as 49ers kicker Joe Nedney got a 37-yard field goal, along with running back Frank Gore getting a 79-yard touchdown run. The Seahawks responded in the second quarter as kicker Olindo Mare made a 36-yard field goal. San Francisco replied with Nedney making a 42-yard field goal. As the Seahawks looked to bounced back from the deficit, quarterback Matt Hasselbeck received an injury as he was hit on the ground by 49ers linebacker Patrick Willis. Hasselbeck left the game with cracked ribs, but Seattle closed out the half with backup Seneca Wallace completing a 1-yard touchdown pass to running back Julius Jones.

In the third quarter, the Seahawks deficit quickly increased as on the 49ers' first offensive play of the second half, Gore exploded for an 80-yard touchdown run. San Francisco closed the game in the fourth quarter as Nedney nailed a 39-yard field goal.

With the loss, Seattle fell to 1–1.

==== Week 3: vs. Chicago Bears ====
Week Three: Seattle Seahawks vs. Chicago Bears – Game summary

| Quarter | 1 | 2 | 3 | 4 | Total |
|---|---|---|---|---|---|
| Bears | 0 | 7 | 10 | 8 | 25 |
| Seahawks | 10 | 3 | 0 | 6 | 19 |

at Qwest Field, Seattle

- Date: September 27
- Game time: 1:06pm local
- Game weather: clear, 60 °F (16 °C), 61% humidity, wind NNW 7 miles per hour (11 km/h)
- Game attendance: 67,938
- Referee: Don Carey
- TV announcers (Fox): Dick Stockton & Charles Davis
- Gamecenter, Gamebook

Game information

First quarter

- SEA – Julius Jones 39-yard pass from Seneca Wallace (Olindo Mare kick), 10:24. Seahawks 7–0. Drive: 7 plays, 57 yards, 2:58.
- SEA – Olindo Mare 46-yard field goal, 0:40. Seahawks 10–0. Drive: 11 plays, 57 yards, 4:47.

Second quarter

- SEA – Olindo Mare 37-yard field goal, 12:02. Seahawks 13–0. Drive: 7 plays, 28 yards, 2:15.
- CHI – Greg Olsen 1-yard pass from Jay Cutler (Robbie Gould kick), 1:56. Seahawks 13–7. Drive: 10 plays, 66 yards, 5:02.

Third quarter

- CHI – Johnny Knox 7-yard pass from Jay Cutler (Robbie Gould kick), 11:28. Bears 14–13. Drive: 5 plays, 42 yards, 2:40.
- CHI – Robbie Gould 37-yard field goal, 5:31. Bears 17–13. Drive: 4 plays, -5 yards, 1:58.

Fourth quarter

- SEA – Olindo Mare 39-yard field goal, 14:48. Bears 17–16. Drive: 13 plays, 59 yards, 5:43.
- SEA – Olindo Mare 46-yard field goal, 5:12. Seahawks 19–17. Drive: 7 plays, 11 yards, 3:00.
- CHI – Devin Hester 36-yard pass from Jay Cutler (Earl Bennett pass from Jay Cutler), 1:52. Bears 25–19. Drive: 6 plays, 71 yards, 3:20.

Top passers

- CHI – Jay Cutler: 21/27, 247 yds, 3 TD, 1 INT
- SEA – Seneca Wallace: 26/44, 261 yds, 1 TD, 1 INT

Top rushers

- CHI – Matt Forte: 21 car, 66 yds
- SEA – Julius Jones: 19 car, 98 yds

Top receivers

- CHI – Earl Bennett: 4 rec, 80 yds
- SEA – Nate Burleson: 9 rec, 109 yds

Team – pass – rush – total – to

- CHI – 233 – 85 – 318 – 2
- SEA – 243 – 103 – 346 – 2

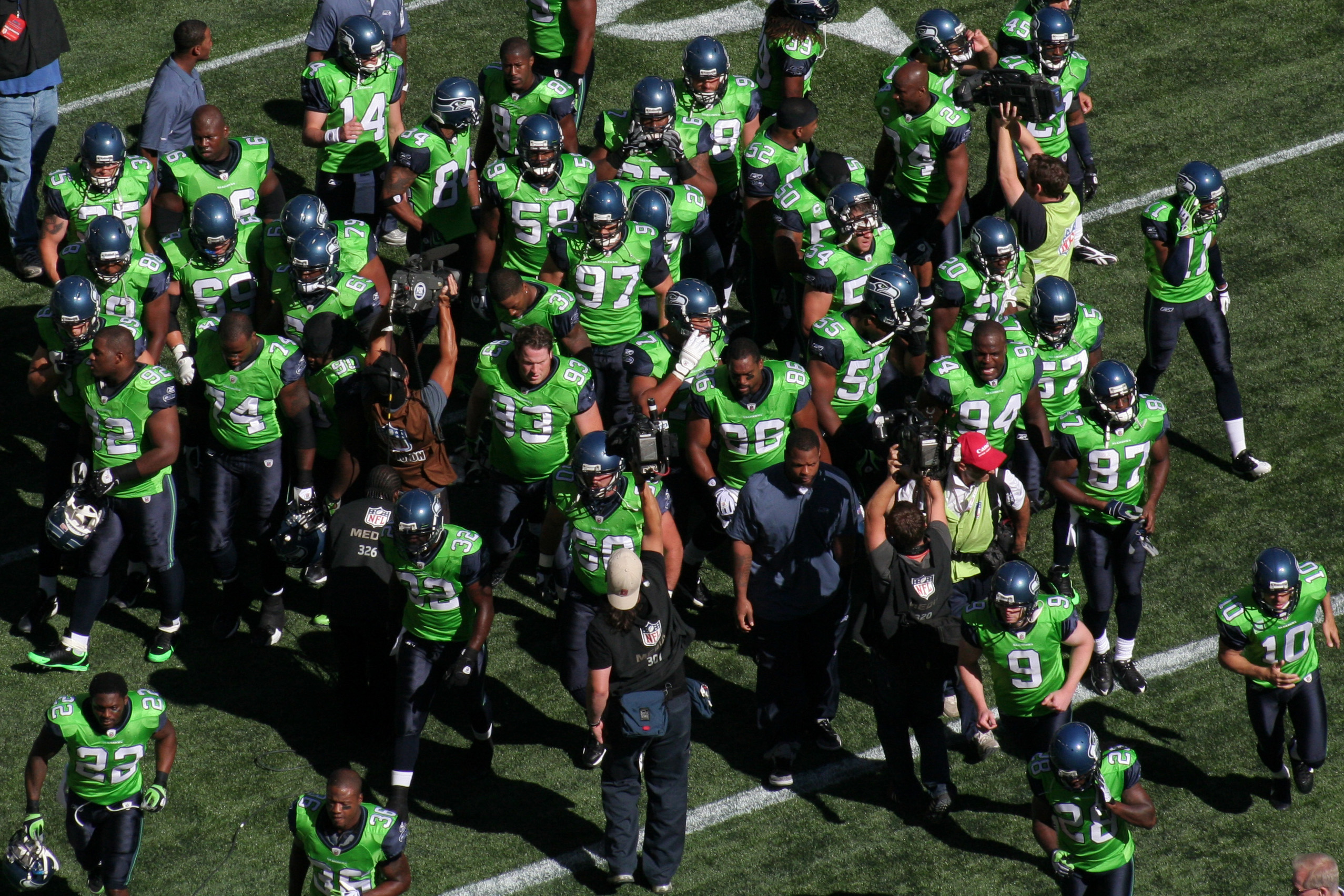
Seahawks players, wearing their alternate uniforms before the Bears game.

Hoping to rebound from their divisional road loss to the 49ers, the Seahawks went home, donned their alternate uniforms, and prepared for a Week 3 duel with the Chicago Bears. Due to quarterback Matt Hasselbeck's rib injury, Seneca Wallace got the start for the game.

Seattle took an early lead in the first quarter with Wallace's 39-yard touchdown pass to running back Julius Jones and kicker Olindo Mare's 46-yard field goal. The Seahawks tacked on Mare's 37-yard field goal in the second quarter, but the Bears answered with quarterback Jay Cutler's 1-yard touchdown pass to tight end Greg Olsen.

Chicago took in the lead in the third quarter with Cutler's 7-yard touchdown pass to wide receiver Johnny Knox, followed by kicker Robbie Gould's 37-yard field goal. The Seahawks regained the lead in the fourth quarter with Mare's 39-yard and 46-yard field goal. However, the Bears got the last laugh as Cutler hooked up with wide receiver Devin Hester on a 36-yard touchdown pass (with a successful 2-point conversion pass to wide receiver Earl Bennett). Seattle tried to rally, but Chicago's defense held on for the win.

With the loss, the Seahawks fell to 1–2.

==== Week 4: at Indianapolis Colts ====
Week Four: Seattle Seahawks at Indianapolis Colts – Game summary

| Quarter | 1 | 2 | 3 | 4 | Total |
|---|---|---|---|---|---|
| Seahawks | 0 | 3 | 0 | 14 | 17 |
| Colts | 7 | 14 | 7 | 6 | 34 |

at Lucas Oil Stadium, Indianapolis

- Date: October 4
- Game time: 1:03pm local
- Game weather: partly cloudy, 56 °F (13 °C), 65% humidity, wind WNW 7 miles per hour (11 km/h)
- Game attendance: 66,112
- Referee: Mike Carey
- TV announcers (Fox): Dick Stockton, Charles Davis & Jaime Maggio
- Gamecenter, Gamebook

Game information

First quarter

- IND – Donald Brown 1-yard run (Adam Vinatieri kick), 6:09. Colts 7–0. Drive: 10 plays, 80 yards, 5:38.

Second quarter

- IND – Reggie Wayne 5-yard pass from Peyton Manning (Adam Vinatieri kick), 5:29. Colts 14–0. Drive: 9 plays, 90 yards, 4:01.
- SEA – Olindo Mare 38-yard field goal, 1:22. Colts 14–3. Drive: 11 plays, 57 yards, 4:07.
- IND – Austin Collie 21-yard pass from Peyton Manning (Adam Vinatieri kick), 0:03. Colts 21–3. Drive: 9 plays, 78 yards, 1:19.

Third quarter

- IND – Joseph Addai 12-yard run (Adam Vinatieri kick), 8:02. Colts 28–3. Drive: 12 plays, 80 yards, 6:58.

Fourth quarter

- IND – Adam Vinatieri 37-yard field goal, 8:50. Colts 31–3. Drive: 7 plays, 29 yards, 3:08.
- IND – Adam Vinatieri 19-yard field goal, 6:58. Colts 34–3. Drive: 4 plays, 4 yards, 1:16.
- SEA – Seneca Wallace 7-yard run (Olindo Mare kick), 2:59. Colts 34–10. Drive: 10 plays, 70 yards, 3:59.
- SEA – Owen Schmitt 1-yard pass from Seneca Wallace (Olindo Mare kick), 0:19. Colts 34–17. Drive: 8 plays, 54 yards, 2:40.

Top passers

- SEA – Seneca Wallace: 33/45, 257 yds, 1 TD
- IND – Peyton Manning: 31/41, 353 yds, 2 TD, 1 INT

Top rushers

- SEA – Julius Jones: 11 car, 25 yds
- IND – Joseph Addai: 12 car, 46 yds, 1 TD

Top receivers

- SEA – T. J. Houshmandzadeh: 8 rec, 102 yds
- IND – Dallas Clark: 8 rec, 80 yds

Team – pass – rush – total – to

- SEA – 230 – 49 – 279 – 2
- IND – 353 – 78 – 431 – 1

Trying to snap a two-game losing streak, the Seahawks flew to Lucas Oil Stadium for a Week 4 inter-conference duel with the Indianapolis Colts. Seattle trailed as Colts running back Donald Brown got a 1-yard touchdown run in the first quarter, followed by quarterback Peyton Manning's 5-yard touchdown pass to wide receiver Reggie Wayne. The Seahawks got on the board with a 38-yard field goal from kicker Olindo Mare, but Indianapolis closed out the half with Manning's 21-yard touchdown pass to wide receiver Austin Collie.

Following running back Joseph Addai's 12-yard touchdown run in the third quarter, the Colts sealed the win with kicker Adam Vinatieri's 37-yard and 19-yard field goals. Seattle ended the scoring with quarterback Matt Hasselbeck getting a 1-yard touchdown run and completing a 1-yard touchdown pass to fullback Owen Schmitt.

With the loss, the Seahawks fell to 1–3.

==== Week 5: vs. Jacksonville Jaguars ====
Week Five: Seattle Seahawks vs. Jacksonville Jaguars – Game summary

| Quarter | 1 | 2 | 3 | 4 | Total |
|---|---|---|---|---|---|
| Jaguars | 0 | 0 | 0 | 0 | 0 |
| Seahawks | 3 | 17 | 14 | 7 | 41 |

at Qwest Field, Seattle

- Date: October 11
- Game time: 1:16pm local
- Game weather: clear, 55 °F (13 °C), 32% humidity, wind calm
- Game attendance: 67,228
- Referee: Scott Green
- TV announcers (CBS): Kevin Harlan & Solomon Wilcots
- Gamecenter, Gamebook

Game information

First quarter

- SEA – Olindo Mare 47-yard field goal, 6:19. Seahawks 3–0. Drive: 11 plays, 54 yards, 3:39.

Second quarter

- SEA – Olindo Mare 27-yard field goal, 7:59. Seahawks 6–0. Drive: 11 plays, 48 yards, 5:08.
- SEA – T. J. Houshmandzadeh 34-yard pass from Matt Hasselbeck (Olindo Mare kick), 4:43. Seahawks 13–0. Drive: 4 plays, 48 yards, 1:32.
- SEA – Nate Burleson 44-yard pass from Matt Hasselbeck (Olindo Mare kick), 2:08. Seahawks 20–0. Drive: 3 plays, 61 yards, 0:58.

Third quarter

- SEA – T. J. Houshmandzadeh 13-yard pass from Matt Hasselbeck (Olindo Mare kick), 10:08. Seahawks 27–0. Drive: 4 plays, 32 yards, 1:12.
- SEA – Nate Burleson 5-yard pass from Matt Hasselbeck (Olindo Mare kick), 5:54. Seahawks 34–0. Drive: 8 plays, 48 yards, 3:04.

Fourth quarter

- SEA – Nick Reed 79-yard defensive fumble return (Olindo Mare kick), 14:01. Seahawks 41–0.

Top passers

- JAX – David Garrard: 18/31, 188 yds
- SEA – Matt Hasselbeck: 18/30, 241 yds, 4 TD

Top rushers

- JAX – Maurice Jones-Drew: 12 car, 34 yds
- SEA – Edgerrin James: 16 car, 46 yds

Top receivers

- JAX – Torry Holt: 7 rec, 95 yds
- SEA – Nate Burleson: 6 rec, 98 yds, 2 TD

Team – pass – rush – total – to

- JAX – 161 – 38 – 199 – 2
- SEA – 236 – 143 – 379 – 0

After missing two weeks with cracked ribs, quarterback Matt Hasselbeck played for the first time since week two at San Francisco. Trying to snap a three-game losing streak, Hasselbeck started the offense off quickly, with Olindo Mare completing two field goals to put Seattle up by 6. The Seahawks defense also held its own, including a 4th-and-2 stop when the Jaguars threaten to score in the red zone. Later in the 2nd quarter, Hasselbeck found wide receiver T. J. Houshmandzadeh for his first touchdown of the year, putting Seattle up 13–0. On their next offensive drive, Hasselbeck connected with Nate Burleson for another touchdown, extending their lead to 20–0, which they took into halftime.

Starting the third quarter on offense, David Garrard and the Jaguars tried to put some points on the board. However, all of their hopes were dashed when defensive end Cory Redding recovered a key fumble for 26 yards. Taking advantage of this, Hasselbeck again found Houshmandzadeh for his second touchdown to seal the game at 27–0. The Seahawks later scored again as Hasselbeck threw his fourth touchdown again to Burleson, while defensive end Nick Reed scored from 79 yards out from a fumble recovery, putting the Seahawks up 41–0.

With the win, the Seahawks improved to 2–3 for the season.

==== Week 6: vs. Arizona Cardinals ====
Week Six: Seattle Seahawks vs. Arizona Cardinals – Game summary

| Quarter | 1 | 2 | 3 | 4 | Total |
|---|---|---|---|---|---|
| Cardinals | 14 | 3 | 7 | 3 | 27 |
| Seahawks | 0 | 3 | 0 | 0 | 3 |

at Qwest Field, Seattle

- Date: October 18
- Game time: 1:05pm local
- Game weather: cloudy, 58 °F (14 °C), 82% humidity, wind S 4 miles per hour (6.4 km/h)
- Game attendance: 67,588
- Referee: Carl Cheffers
- TV announcers (Fox): Chris Myers & Brian Billick
- Gamecenter, Gamebook

Game information

First quarter

- ARI – Larry Fitzgerald 2-yard pass from Kurt Warner (Neil Rackers kick), 4:18. Cardinals 7–0. Drive: 15 plays, 80 yards, 10:42.
- ARI – Tim Hightower 2-yard run (Neil Rackers kick), 3:07. Cardinals 14–0. Drive: 3 plays, 23 yards, 1:11.

Second quarter

- ARI – Neil Rackers 29-yard field goal, 13:38. Cardinals 17–0. Drive: 7 plays, 12 yards, 3:46.
- SEA – Olindo Mare 28-yard field goal, 3:57. Cardinals 17–3. Drive: 9 plays, 59 yards, 4:12.

Third quarter

- ARI – Steve Breaston 16-yard pass from Kurt Warner (Neil Rackers kick), 2:54. Cardinals 24–3. Drive: 5 plays, 41 yards, 2:14.

Fourth quarter

- ARI – Neil Rackers 31-yard field goal, 6:05. Cardinals 27–3. Drive: 4 plays, 2 yards, 0:38.

Top passers

- ARI – Kurt Warner: 32/41, 276 yds, 2 TD, 1 INT
- SEA – Matt Hasselbeck: 10/29, 112 yds, 1 INT

Top rushers

- ARI – Tim Hightower: 13 car, 32 yds, 1 TD
- SEA – Julius Jones: 5 car, 5 yds

Top receivers

- ARI – Larry Fitzgerald: 13 rec, 100 yds, 1 TD
- SEA – John Carlson: 2 rec, 55 yds

Team – pass – rush – total – to

- ARI – 282 – 62 – 344 – 2
- SEA – 114 – 14 – 128 – 2

Fresh off their dominating win over the Jaguars, the Seahawks stayed at home for a Week 6 NFC West duel with the Arizona Cardinals. Seattle trailed in the first quarter as Cardinals quarterback Kurt Warner completed a 2-yard touchdown pass to wide receiver Larry Fitzgerald, followed by running back Tim Hightower's 2-yard touchdown run. Arizona increased its lead in the second quarter with a 29-yard field goal from kicker Neil Rackers. The Seahawks then got on the board as kicker Olindo Mare nailed a 28-yard field goal. However, the Cardinals took control in the second half as Warner found wide receiver Steve Breaston on a 16-yard touchdown pass in the third quarter, followed by Rackers' 31-yard field goal in the fourth.

With the loss, Seattle went into their bye week at 2–4.

==== Week 8: at Dallas Cowboys ====
Week Eight: Seattle Seahawks at Dallas Cowboys – Game summary

| Quarter | 1 | 2 | 3 | 4 | Total |
|---|---|---|---|---|---|
| Seahawks | 3 | 7 | 0 | 7 | 17 |
| Cowboys | 7 | 14 | 14 | 3 | 38 |

at Cowboys Stadium, Arlington, Texas

- Date: November 1
- Game time: 12:03pm local
- Game weather: indoors
- Game attendance: 80,886
- Referee: Jerome Boger
- TV announcers (Fox): Dick Stockton & Charles Davis
- Gamecenter, Gamebook

Game information

First quarter

- SEA – Olindo Mare 43-yard field goal, 6:58. Seahawks 3–0. Drive: 14 plays, 69 yards, 5:58.
- DAL – Sam Hurd 36-yard pass from Tony Romo (Nick Folk kick), 3:12. Cowboys 7–3. Drive: 7 plays, 78 yards, 3:46.

Second quarter

- DAL – Marion Barber 2-yard run (Nick Folk kick), 13:26. Cowboys 14–3. Drive: 6 plays, 30 yards, 3:26.
- SEA – Deion Branch 23-yard pass from Matt Hasselbeck (Olindo Mare kick), 10:25. Cowboys 14–10. Drive: 9 plays, 80 yards, 3:01.
- DAL – Roy Williams 7-yard pass from Tony Romo (Nick Folk kick), 0:35. Cowboys 21–10. Drive: 10 plays, 65 yards, 3:21.

Third quarter

- DAL – Miles Austin 3-yard pass from Tony Romo (Nick Folk kick), 2:39. Cowboys 28–10. Drive: 9 plays, 62 yards, 5:13.
- DAL – Patrick Crayton 82-yard punt return (Nick Folk kick), 1:11. Cowboys 35–10.

Fourth quarter

- DAL – Nick Folk 40-yard field goal, 10:58. Cowboys 38–10. Drive: 7 plays, 41 yards, 3:51.
- SEA – Justin Griffith 4-yard pass from Matt Hasselbeck (Olindo Mare kick), 8:40. Cowboys 38–17. Drive: 2 plays, 8 yards, 0:34.

Top passers

- SEA – Matt Hasselbeck: 22/39, 249 yds, 2 TD
- DAL – Tony Romo: 21/36, 256 yds, 3 TD

Top rushers

- SEA – Julius Jones: 15 car, 56 yds
- DAL – Marion Barber: 14 car, 53 yds, 1 TD

Top receivers

- SEA – Nate Burleson: 6 rec, 89 yds
- DAL – Miles Austin: 5 rec, 61 yds, 1 TD

Team – pass – rush – total – to

- SEA – 229 – 79 – 308 – 2
- DAL – 249 – 113 – 362 – 1

Hoping to rebound from their divisional home loss to the Cardinals, the Seahawks flew to Cowboys Stadium for a Week 8 showdown with the Dallas Cowboys. In the first quarter, Seattle struck first as kicker Olindo Mare got a 43-yard field goal. However, the Cowboys answered with quarterback Tony Romo's 36-yard touchdown pass to wide receiver Sam Hurd. Dallas increased their lead in the second quarter with a 2-yard touchdown run from running back Marion Barber. The Seahawks replied with quarterback Matt Hasselbeck completing a 23-yard touchdown pass to wide receiver Deion Branch, but Dallas came right back with Romo finding wide receiver Roy Williams on a 7-yard touchdown pass.

The Cowboys took a huge lead with Romo's 3-yard touchdown pass to wide receiver Miles Austin, followed by wide receiver Patrick Crayton returning a punt 82 yards for a touchdown. In the fourth quarter, Dallas closed out its scoring with a 40-yard field goal from kicker Nick Folk. Seattle tried to rally, but could only muster up Hasselbeck's 4-yard touchdown pass to fullback Justin Griffith.

With the loss, the Seahawks fell to 2–5.

==== Week 9: vs. Detroit Lions ====
Week Nine: Seattle Seahawks vs. Detroit Lions – Game summary

| Quarter | 1 | 2 | 3 | 4 | Total |
|---|---|---|---|---|---|
| Lions | 17 | 0 | 0 | 3 | 20 |
| Seahawks | 0 | 13 | 9 | 10 | 32 |

at Qwest Field, Seattle

- Date: November 8
- Game time: 1:06pm local
- Game weather: cloudy, 48 °F (9 °C), 80% humidity, wind SE 11 miles per hour (18 km/h)
- Game attendance: 67,003
- Referee: John Parry
- TV announcers (Fox): Dick Stockton & Charles Davis
- Gamecenter, Gamebook

Game information

First quarter

- DET – Brandon Pettigrew 7-yard pass from Matthew Stafford (Jason Hanson kick), 6:18. Lions 7–0. Drive: 1 play, 2 yards, 0:05.
- DET – Bryant Johnson 29-yard pass from Matthew Stafford (Jason Hanson kick), 5:19. Lions 14–0. Drive: 3 plays, 29 yards, 0:47.
- DET – Jason Hanson 41-yard field goal, 0:43. Lions 17–0. Drive: 7 plays, 15 yards, 2:50.

Second quarter

- SEA – Julius Jones 3-yard run (Olindo Mare kick), 10:47. Lions 17–7. Drive: 10 plays, 80 yards, 4:56.
- SEA – Olindo Mare 37-yard field goal, 3:00. Lions 17–10. Drive: 10 plays, 54 yards, 5:32.
- SEA – Olindo Mare 37-yard field goal, 0:02. Lions 17–13. Drive: 9 plays, 65 yards, 1:11.

Third quarter

- SEA – Olindo Mare 24-yard field goal, 9:24. Lions 17–16. Drive: 8 plays, 72 yards, 2:46.
- SEA – T. J. Houshmandzadeh 2-yard pass from Matt Hasselbeck (pass failed), 2:32. Seahawks 22–17. Drive: 7 plays, 68 yards, 3:04.

Fourth quarter

- SEA – Olindo Mare 20-yard field goal, 10:09. Seahawks 25–17. Drive: 13 plays, 54 yards, 5:45.
- DET – Jason Hanson 50-yard field goal, 8:04. Seahawks 25–20. Drive: 5 plays, 38 yards, 2:05.
- SEA – Josh Wilson 61-yard interception return (Olindo Mare kick), 0:22. Seahawks 32–20.

Top passers

- DET – Matthew Stafford: 22/42, 203 yds, 2 TD, 5 INT
- SEA – Matt Hasselbeck: 39/51, 329 yds, 1 TD, 1 INT

Top rushers

- DET – Kevin Smith: 13 car, 67 yds
- SEA – Julius Jones: 16 car, 36 yds, 1 TD

Top receivers

- DET – Brandon Pettigrew: 7 rec, 70 yds, 1 TD
- SEA – Julius Jones: 6 rec, 78 yds

Team – pass – rush – total – to

- DET – 186 – 114 – 300 – 5
- SEA – 342 – 55 – 397 – 2

Trying to snap a two-game losing streak, the Seahawks went home for a Week 9 duel with the Detroit Lions. Seattle trailed in the first quarter as Lions quarterback Matthew Stafford completed a 7-yard touchdown pass to tight end Brandon Pettigrew and a 29-yard touchdown pass to wide receiver Bryant Johnson, followed by kicker Jason Hanson getting a 41-yard field goal. Seattle answered in the second quarter as running back Julius Jones got a 3-yard touchdown run, followed by kicker Olindo Mare nailing a pair of 37-yard field goals.

In the third quarter, the Seahawks took the lead as Mare got a 24-yard field goal, while quarterback Matt Hasselbeck hooked up with wide receiver T. J. Houshmandzadeh on a 2-yard touchdown pass (with a failed two-point conversion). Seattle increased their lead in the fourth quarter as Mare booted a 20-yard field goal. Detroit tried to rally as Hanson made a 50-yard field goal, but the Seahawks ended the scoring with cornerback Josh Wilson returning an interception 61 yards for a touchdown.

With the win, Seattle improved to 3–5.

==== Week 10: at Arizona Cardinals ====
Week Ten: Seattle Seahawks at Arizona Cardinals – Game summary

| Quarter | 1 | 2 | 3 | 4 | Total |
|---|---|---|---|---|---|
| Seahawks | 7 | 10 | 0 | 3 | 20 |
| Cardinals | 0 | 10 | 7 | 14 | 31 |

at University of Phoenix Stadium, Glendale, Arizona

- Date: November 15
- Game time: 2:15pm local
- Game weather: indoors
- Game attendance: 62,278
- Referee: Walt Coleman
- TV announcers (Fox): Dick Stockton & Charles Davis
- Gamecenter, Gamebook

Game information

First quarter

- SEA – Justin Forsett 11-yard run (Olindo Mare kick), 0:20. Seahawks 7–0. Drive: 6 plays, 99 yards, 2:32.

Second quarter

- SEA – John Carlson 31-yard pass from Matt Hasselbeck (Olindo Mare kick), 8:29. Seahawks 14–0. Drive: 5 plays, 54 yards, 1:27.
- ARI – Steve Breaston 28-yard pass from Kurt Warner (Neil Rackers kick), 5:30. Seahawks 14–7. Drive: 6 plays, 65 yards, 2:59.
- SEA – Olindo Mare 32-yard field goal, 1:09. Seahawks 17–7. Drive: 12 plays, 67 yards, 4:21.
- ARI – Neil Rackers 27-yard field goal, 0:00. Seahawks 17–10. Drive: 8 plays, 71 yards, 1:09.

Third quarter

- ARI – Beanie Wells 10-yard run (Neil Rackers kick), 8:13. Tied 17–17. Drive: 13 plays, 82 yards, 6:47.

Fourth quarter

- SEA – Olindo Mare 20-yard field goal, 13:02. Seahawks 20–17. Drive: 13 plays, 91 yards, 5:30.
- ARI – Beanie Wells 13-yard run (Neil Rackers kick), 11:20. Cardinals 24–20. Drive: 4 plays, 80 yards, 1:42.
- ARI – Larry Fitzgerald 18-yard pass from Kurt Warner (Neil Rackers kick), 6:11. Cardinals 31–20. Drive: 6 plays, 85 yards, 3:14.

Top passers

- SEA – Matt Hasselbeck: 26/52, 315 yds, 1 TD 2 INT
- ARI – Kurt Warner: 29/38, 340 yds, 2 TD

Top rushers

- SEA – Justin Forsett: 17 car, 123 yds, 1 TD
- ARI – Beanie Wells: 16 car, 85 yds, 2 TD

Top receivers

- SEA – T. J. Houshmandzadeh: 9 rec, 165 yds
- ARI – Anquan Boldin: 8 rec, 105 yds

Team – pass – rush – total – to

- SEA – 308 – 164 – 472 – 2
- ARI – 340 – 122 – 462 – 0

Coming off their home win over the Lions, the Seahawks flew to the University of Phoenix Stadium for a Week 10 NFC West rematch with the Arizona Cardinals. Seattle took flight in the first quarter as running back Justin Forsett got an 11-yard touchdown run. The Seahawks added to their lead in the second quarter with quarterback Matt Hasselbeck completing a 31-yard touchdown pass to tight end John Carlson. The Cardinals answered with quarterback Kurt Warner completing a 28-yard touchdown pass to wide receiver Steve Breaston, yet Seattle came right back with a 32-yard field goal from kicker Olindo Mare. Arizona closed out the half with kicker Neil Rackers nailing a 27-yard field goal.

In the third quarter, the Cardinals tied the game with running back Chris "Beanie" Wells getting a 10-yard touchdown run. The Seahawks responded in the fourth quarter as Mare booted a 20-yard field goal, but Arizona got the last laugh as Wells picked up a 13-yard touchdown run and Warner hooked up with wide receiver Larry Fitzgerald on an 18-yard touchdown pass.

With the loss, Seattle fell to 3–6.

==== Week 11: at Minnesota Vikings ====
Week Eleven: Seattle Seahawks at Minnesota Vikings – Game summary

| Quarter | 1 | 2 | 3 | 4 | Total |
|---|---|---|---|---|---|
| Seahawks | 0 | 0 | 3 | 6 | 9 |
| Vikings | 0 | 21 | 7 | 7 | 35 |

at Metrodome, Minneapolis

- Date: November 22
- Game time: 12:05pm local
- Game weather: indoors
- Game attendance: 63,854
- Referee: Ed Hochuli
- TV announcers (Fox): Dick Stockton & Charles Davis
- Gamecenter, Gamebook

Game information

First quarter

- No scoring plays.

Second quarter

- MIN – Percy Harvin 23-yard pass from Brett Favre (Ryan Longwell kick), 10:05. Vikings 7–0. Drive: 10 plays, 84 yards, 5:01.
- MIN – Visanthe Shiancoe 8-yard pass from Brett Favre (Ryan Longwell kick), 4:57. Vikings 14–0. Drive: 6 plays, 70 yards, 2:32.
- MIN – Bernard Berrian 3-yard pass from Brett Favre (Ryan Longwell kick), 1:12. Vikings 21–0. Drive: 6 plays, 34 yards, 3:34.

Third quarter

- MIN – Sidney Rice 7-yard pass from Brett Favre (Ryan Longwell kick), 4:08. Vikings 28–0. Drive: 12 plays, 89 yards, 6:37.
- SEA – Olindo Mare 40-yard field goal, 0:43. Vikings 28–3. Drive: 7 plays, 47 yards, 3:25.

Fourth quarter

- MIN – Sidney Rice 34-yard pass from Tarvaris Jackson (Ryan Longwell kick), 10:21. Vikings 35–3. Drive: 10 plays, 80 yards, 5:22.
- SEA – Julius Jones 1-yard run (pass failed), 8:05. Vikings 35–9. Drive: 6 plays, 78 yards, 2:16.

Top passers

- SEA – Matt Hasselbeck: 19/26, 231 yds, 1 INT
- MIN – Brett Favre: 22/25, 213 yds, 4 TD

Top rushers

- SEA – Justin Forsett: 8 car, 9 yds, 1 TD
- MIN – Adrian Peterson: 24 car, 82 yds

Top receivers

- SEA – Nate Burleson: 6 rec, 100 yds
- MIN – Sidney Rice: 6 rec, 89 yds, 2 TD

Team – pass – rush – total – to

- SEA – 208 – 4 – 212 – 2
- MIN – 271 – 160 – 431 – 0

Hoping to rebound from their loss to the Cardinals, the Seahawks flew to the Hubert H. Humphrey Metrodome for an Inter conference duel with the Minnesota Vikings.

Seattle trailed early in the second quarter when quarterback Brett Favre completed three touchdown passes: one to wide receiver Percy Harvin for 23 yards, tight end Visanthe Shiancoe for 8 yards and then to wide receiver Bernard Berrian for 3 yards. Then in the third quarter the margin increased as Favre hooked up with wide receiver Sidney Rice on a 7-yard touchdown pass. Then Seattle's kicker Olindo Mare got a 40-yard field goal to avoid a shutout loss. In the fourth quarter the margin increased even further as quarterback Tarvaris Jackson made a 34-yard touchdown pass to wide receiver Sidney Rice, then Seattle had their first touchdown of this game when running back Justin Forsett made a 1-yard run (with a failed 2-point conversion attempt).

With the loss, Seattle fell to 3–7.

==== Week 12: at St. Louis Rams ====
Week Twelve: Seattle Seahawks at St. Louis Rams – Game summary

| Quarter | 1 | 2 | 3 | 4 | Total |
|---|---|---|---|---|---|
| Seahawks | 7 | 7 | 3 | 10 | 27 |
| Rams | 0 | 10 | 0 | 7 | 17 |

at Edward Jones Dome, St. Louis, Missouri

- Date: November 29
- Game time: 12:00pm local
- Game weather: indoors
- Game attendance: 47,475
- Referee: Scott Green
- TV announcers (Fox): Ron Pitts, John Lynch & Nischelle Turner
- Gamecenter, Gamebook

Game information

First quarter

- SEA – Justin Forsett 3-yard run (Olindo Mare kick), 7:54. Seahawks 7–0. Drive: 8 plays, 64 yards, 3:33.

Second quarter

- STL – Donnie Avery 1-yard pass from Kyle Boller (Josh Brown kick), 13:34. Tied 7–7. Drive: 10 plays, 65 yards, 4:47.
- SEA – Josh Wilson 65-yard interception return (Olindo Mare kick), 1:38. Seahawks 14–7.
- STL – Josh Brown 55-yard field goal, 0:00. Seahawks 14–10. Drive: 10 plays, 43 yards, 1:38.

Third quarter

- SEA – Olindo Mare 29-yard field goal, 3:37. Seahawks 17–10. Drive: 11 plays, 59 yards, 4:17.

Fourth quarter

- SEA – Julius Jones 2-yard run (Olindo Mare kick), 13:57. Seahawks 24–10. Drive: 7 plays, 44 yards, 2:21.
- SEA – Olindo Mare 38-yard field goal, 9:24. Seahawks 27–10. Drive: 6 plays, 31 yards, 2:57.
- STL – Steven Jackson 1-yard run (Josh Brown kick), 0:44. Seahawks 27–17. Drive: 8 plays, 80 yards, 2:06.

Top passers

- SEA – Matt Hasselbeck: 14/25, 102 yds
- STL – Kyle Boller: 28/46, 282 yds, 1 TD, 2 INT

Top rushers

- SEA – Justin Forsett: 22 car, 103 yds, 2 TD
- STL – Steven Jackson: 23 car, 89 yds, 1 TD

Top receivers

- SEA – Nate Burleson: 4 rec, 46 yds
- STL – Ruvell Martin: 2 rec, 60 yds

Team – pass – rush – total – to

- SEA – 95 – 170 – 265 – 1
- STL – 251 – 113 – 364 – 2

==== Week 13: vs. San Francisco 49ers ====
Week Thirteen: Seattle Seahawks vs. San Francisco 49ers – Game summary

| Quarter | 1 | 2 | 3 | 4 | Total |
|---|---|---|---|---|---|
| 49ers | 7 | 7 | 0 | 3 | 17 |
| Seahawks | 7 | 7 | 0 | 6 | 20 |

at Qwest Field, Seattle

- Date: December 6
- Game time: 1:16pm local
- Game weather: cloudy, 35 °F (2 °C), 57% humidity, wind SSE 6 miles per hour (9.7 km/h)
- Game attendance: 67,761
- Referee: Alberto Riveron
- TV announcers (Fox): Chris Myers, Ross Tucker & Jaime Maggio
- Gamecenter, Gamebook

Game information

First quarter

- SF – Vernon Davis 33-yard pass from Alex Smith (Joe Nedney kick), 6:16. 49ers 7–0. Drive: 4 plays, 42 yards, 2:10.
- SEA – Deion Branch 7-yard pass from Matt Hasselbeck (Olindo Mare kick), 3:48. Tied 7–7. Drive: 3 plays, 13 yards, 0:46.

Second quarter

- SEA – Justin Forsett 8-yard pass from Matt Hasselbeck (Olindo Mare kick), 10:06. Seahawks 14–7. Drive: 12 plays, 87 yards, 5:40.
- SF – Josh Morgan 22-yard pass from Alex Smith (Joe Nedney kick), 7:40. Tied 14–14. Drive: 4 plays, 77 yards, 2:26.

Third quarter

- No scoring plays

Fourth quarter

- SEA – Olindo Mare 25-yard field goal, 5:30. Seahawks 17–14. Drive: 7 plays, 34 yards, 3:41.
- SF – Joe Nedney 34-yard field goal, 2:57. Tied 17–17. Drive: 6 plays, 48 yards, 2:33.
- SEA – Olindo Mare 30-yard field goal, 0:00. Seahawks 20–17. Drive: 3 plays, 40 yards, 0:21.

Top passers

- SF – Alex Smith: 27/45, 310 yds, 2 TD
- SEA – Matt Hasselbeck: 25/34, 198 yds, 2 TD

Top rushers

- SF – Frank Gore: 9 car, 25 yds
- SEA – Julius Jones: 20 car, 67 yds

Top receivers

- SF – Vernon Davis: 6 rec, 111 yds, 1 TD
- SEA – Nate Burleson: 5 rec, 54 yds

Team – pass – rush – total – to

- SF – 303 – 53 – 356 – 2
- SEA – 185 – 107 – 292 – 1

==== Week 14: at Houston Texans ====
Week Fourteen: Seattle Seahawks at Houston Texans – Game summary

| Quarter | 1 | 2 | 3 | 4 | Total |
|---|---|---|---|---|---|
| Seahawks | 0 | 7 | 0 | 0 | 7 |
| Texans | 17 | 7 | 10 | 0 | 34 |

at Reliant Stadium, Houston

- Date: December 13
- Game time: 12:02pm local
- Game weather: indoors
- Game attendance: 70,380
- Referee: Pete Morelli
- TV announcers (Fox): Ron Pitts & John Lynch
- Gamecenter, Gamebook

Game information

First quarter

- HOU – Andre Johnson 64-yard pass from Matt Schaub (Kris Brown kick), 14:44. Texans 7–0. Drive: 1 play, 64 yards, 0:16.
- HOU – Kris Brown 29-yard field goal, 9:14. Texans 10–0. Drive: 9 plays, 41 yards, 4:10.
- HOU – Ryan Moats 4-yard run (Kris Brown kick), 2:50. Texans 17–0. Drive: 9 plays, 56 yards, 4:56.

Second quarter

- HOU – Andre Johnson 17-yard pass from Matt Schaub (Kris Brown kick), 12:52. Texans 24–0. Drive: 8 plays, 64 yards, 3:13.
- SEA – John Carlson 4-yard pass from Matt Hasselbeck (Olindo Mare kick), 1:14. Texans 24–7. Drive: 6 plays, 84 yards, 2:15.

Third quarter

- HOU – Kris Brown 31-yard field goal, 5:50. Texans 27–7. Drive: 8 plays, 36 yards, 3:59.
- HOU – Bernard Pollard 70-yard interception return (Kris Brown kick), 2:57. Texans 34–7.

Fourth quarter

- No scoring plays.

Top passers

- SEA – Matt Hasselbeck: 24/35, 247 yds, 1 TD, 1 INT
- HOU – Matt Schaub: 29/39, 365 yds, 2 TD, 1 INT

Top rushers

- SEA – Julius Jones: 10 car, 39 yds
- HOU – Ryan Moats: 10 car, 43 yds, 1 TD

Top receivers

- SEA – T. J. Houshmandzadeh: 4 rec, 52 yds
- HOU – Andre Johnson: 11 rec, 193 yds, 2 TD

Team – pass – rush – total – to

- SEA – 220 – 62 – 282 – 1
- HOU – 365 – 85 – 450 – 2

==== Week 15: vs. Tampa Bay Buccaneers ====
Week Fifteen: Seattle Seahawks vs. Tampa Bay Buccaneers – Game summary

| Quarter | 1 | 2 | 3 | 4 | Total |
|---|---|---|---|---|---|
| Buccaneers | 0 | 3 | 18 | 3 | 24 |
| Seahawks | 0 | 7 | 0 | 0 | 7 |

at Qwest Field, Seattle

- Date: December 20
- Game time: 1:16pm local
- Game weather: cloudy, 52 °F (11 °C), 83% humidity, wind SE 12 miles per hour (19 km/h)
- Game attendance: 67,011
- Referee: Mike Carey
- TV announcers (Fox): Ron Pitts, John Lynch & Nischelle Turner
- Gamecenter, Gamebook

Game information

First quarter

- No scoring plays.

Second quarter

- SEA – John Carlson 29-yard pass from Matt Hasselbeck (Olindo Mare kick), 4:31. Seahawks 7–0. Drive: 8 plays, 85 yards, 4:09.
- TB – Connor Barth 28-yard field goal, 0:15. Seahawks 7–3. Drive: 5 plays, 15 yards, 0:37.

Third quarter

- TB – Connor Barth 45-yard field goal, 8:44. Seahawks 7–6. Drive: 10 plays, 50 yards, 6:16.
- TB – Cadillac Williams 22-yard pass from Josh Freeman (Connor Barth kick), 7:44. Buccaneers 13–7. Drive: 1 play, 22 yards, 0:08.
- TB – Derrick Ward 6-yard pass from Josh Freeman (Josh Freeman run), 2:41. Buccaneers 21–7. Drive: 9 plays, 37 yards, 4:30.

Fourth quarter

- TB – Connor Barth 39-yard field goal, 11:20. Buccaneers 24–7. Drive: 8 plays, 47 yards, 3:53.

Top passers

- TB – Josh Freeman: 16/26, 205 yds, 2 TD, 1 INT
- SEA – Matt Hasselbeck: 27/46, 256 yds, 1 TD, 4 INT

Top rushers

- TB – Derrick Ward: 19 car, 67 yds
- SEA – Julius Jones: 12 car, 65 yds

Top receivers

- TB – Kellen Winslow: 6 rec, 93 yds
- SEA – John Carlson: 7 rec, 86 yds, 1 TD

Team – pass – rush – total – to

- TB – 205 – 134 – 339 – 1
- SEA – 252 – 128 – 380 – 5

==== Week 16: at Green Bay Packers ====
Week Sixteen: Seattle Seahawks at Green Bay Packers – Game summary

| Quarter | 1 | 2 | 3 | 4 | Total |
|---|---|---|---|---|---|
| Seahawks | 0 | 3 | 0 | 7 | 10 |
| Packers | 14 | 10 | 14 | 10 | 48 |

at Lambeau Field, Green Bay, Wisconsin

- Date: December 27
- Game time: 12:02pm local
- Game weather: partly cloudy, 18 °F (−8 °C), 96% humidity, wind SW 5 miles per hour (8.0 km/h)
- Game attendance: 70,429
- Referee: Walt Coleman
- TV announcers (Fox): Thom Brennaman & Brian Billick
- Gamecenter, Gamebook

Game information

First quarter

- GB – Brandon Jackson 13-yard pass from Aaron Rodgers (Mason Crosby kick), 6:34. Packers 7–0. Drive: 4 plays, 35 yards, 2:16.
- GB – Ryan Grant 3-yard run (Mason Crosby kick), 0:23. Packers 14–0. Drive: 5 plays, 73 yards, 2:15.

Second quarter

- SEA – Olindo Mare 28-yard field goal, 7:12. Packers 14–3. Drive: 9 plays, 53 yards, 3:53.
- GB – Ryan Grant 56-yard run (Mason Crosby kick), 5:36. Packers 21–3. Drive: 4 plays, 67 yards, 1:36.
- GB – Mason Crosby 29-yard field goal, 0:00. Packers 24–3. Drive: 10 plays, 69 yards, 4:37.

Third quarter

- GB – Brandon Jackson 6-yard run (Mason Crosby kick), 10:13. Packers 31–3. Drive: 7 plays, 47 yards, 3:54.
- GB – Brandon Jackson 4-yard run (Mason Crosby kick), 5:27. Packers 38–3. Drive: 6 plays, 62 yards, 3:52.

Fourth quarter

- GB – Mason Crosby 52-yard field goal, 10:48. Packers 41–3. Drive: 9 plays, 37, 4:40.
- GB – Ahman Green 6-yard run (Mason Crosby kick), 6:39. Packers 48–3. Drive: 4 plays, 51 yards, 2:19.
- SEA – John Carlson 16-yard pass from Matt Hasselbeck (Olindo Mare kick), 4:15. Packers 48–10. Drive: 6 plays, 55 yards, 2:24.

Top passers

- SEA – Matt Hasselbeck: 19/37, 198 yds, 1 TD, 4 INT
- GB – Aaron Rodgers: 12/23, 237 yds, 1 TD

Top rushers

- SEA – Justin Forsett: 14 car, 70 yds
- GB – Ryan Grant: 16 car, 97 yds, 2 TD

Top receivers

- SEA – Deion Branch: 5 rec, 53 yds
- GB – Greg Jennings: 4 rec, 111 yds

Team – pass – rush – total – to

- SEA – 176 – 115 – 291 – 4
- GB – 264 – 153 – 417 – 0

The Packers demolished the Seahawks by the score of 48–10 on a cloudy Sunday afternoon at Lambeau Field. This 38-point loss (their biggest loss to the Packers) dropped the Seahawks to 5–10.

==== Week 17: vs. Tennessee Titans ====
Week Seventeen: Seattle Seahawks vs. Tennessee Titans – Game summary

| Quarter | 1 | 2 | 3 | 4 | Total |
|---|---|---|---|---|---|
| Titans | 7 | 0 | 3 | 7 | 17 |
| Seahawks | 0 | 7 | 3 | 3 | 13 |

at Qwest Field, Seattle

- Date: January 3
- Game time: 1:18pm local
- Game weather: cloudy, 46 °F (8 °C), 85% humidity, wind calm
- Game attendance: 67,002
- Referee: Ed Hochuli
- TV announcers (CBS): Ian Eagle & Rich Gannon
- Gamecenter, Gamebook

Game information

First quarter

- TEN – Chris Johnson 6-yard run (Rob Bironas kick), 7:56. Titans 7–0. Drive: 13 plays, 82 yards, 7:04.

Second quarter

- SEA – John Carlson 6-yard pass from Matt Hasselbeck (Olindo Mare kick), 9:41. Tied 7–7. Drive: 5 plays, 73 yards, 2:18.

Third quarter

- SEA – Olindo Mare 35-yard field goal, 11:29. Seahawks 10–7. Drive: 7 plays, 43 yards, 3:31.
- TEN – Rob Bironas 47-yard field goal, 4:40. Tied 10–10. Drive: 14 plays, 50 yards, 6:49.

Fourth quarter

- SEA – Olindo Mare 20-yard field goal, 12:29. Seahawks 13–10. Drive: 9 plays, 29 yards, 2:56.
- TEN – Chris Johnson 1-yard run (Rob Bironas kick), 4:33. Titans 17–13. Drive: 5 plays, 28 yards, 2:26.

Top passers

- TEN – Vince Young: 17/28, 171 yds, 1 INT
- SEA – Matt Hasselbeck: 15/30, 175 yds, 1 TD, 1 INT

Top rushers

- TEN – Chris Johnson: 36 car, 134 yds, 2 TD
- SEA – Justin Forsett: 10 car, 74 yds

Top receivers

- TEN – Nate Washington: 6 rec, 83 yds
- SEA – Deion Branch: 4 rec, 77 yds

Team – pass – rush – total – to

- TEN – 171 – 133 – 304 – 2
- SEA – 169 – 140 – 309 – 1

Chris Johnson became the sixth player in NFL history to break 2,000 rushing yards and also broke the record (held by Marshall Faulk) of total yards from scrimmage at 2,509. Johnson rushed 36 times for 134 yards and two touchdowns; a 64-yard rushing score was called back on a holding penalty. Matt Hasselbeck was 15–30 for 175 yards, one touchdown, and one pick.
