= D. D. Lewis =

D. D. Lewis may refer to:

- D. D. Lewis (1970s linebacker) (1945–2025), American football player for the Dallas Cowboys
- D. D. Lewis (2000s linebacker) (born 1979), American football player for the Seattle Seahawks and Denver Broncos
- Daniel Day-Lewis, English actor

== See also ==
- Lewis (surname)
