= Cory Redding =

American football player (born 1980)

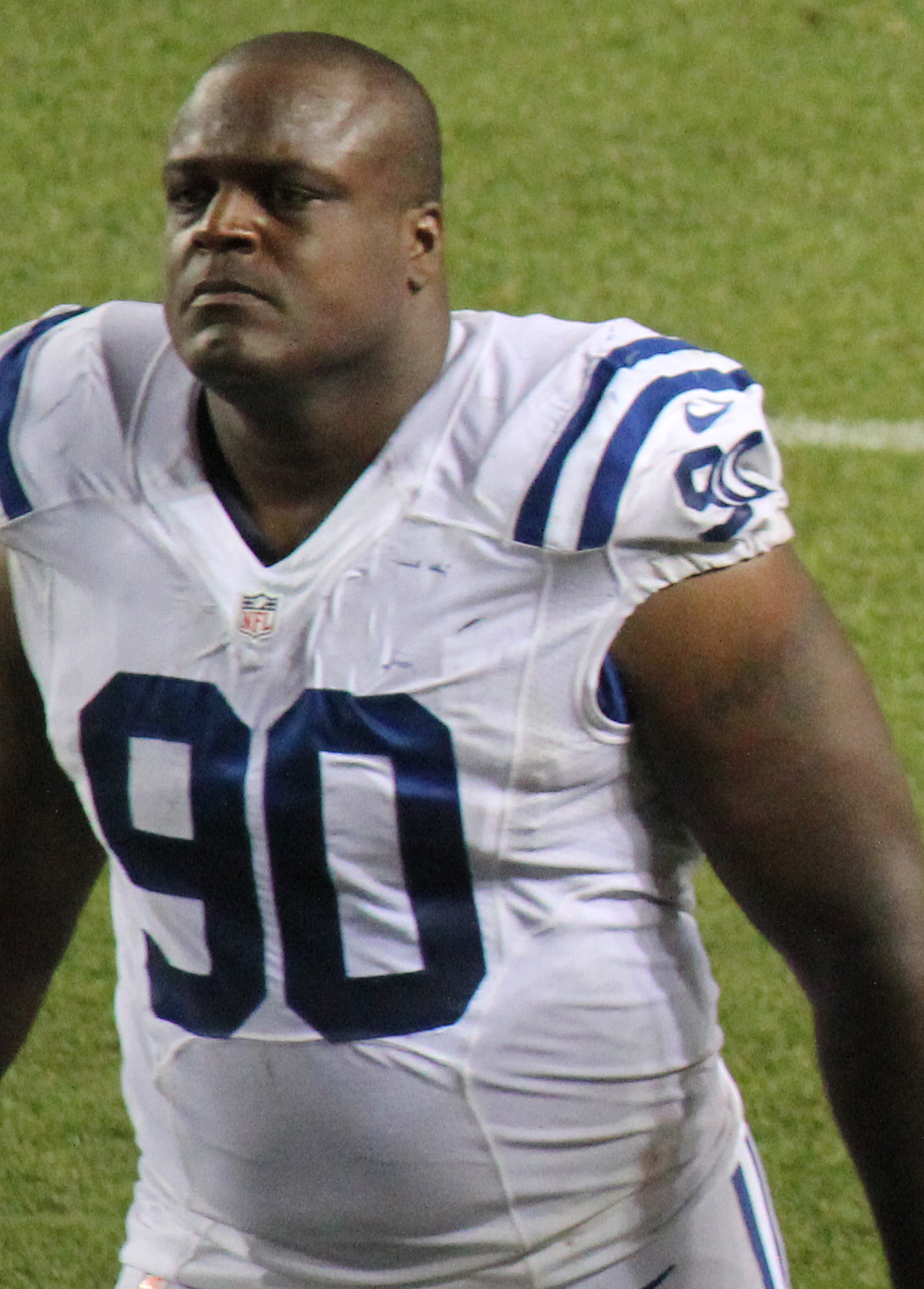
- Redding with the Indianapolis Colts in 2014

No. 78, 94, 93, 90
- Position: Defensive tackle

Personal information
- Born: November 15, 1980 (age 45); Houston, Texas, U.S.
- Listed height: 6 ft 4 in (1.93 m)
- Listed weight: 318 lb (144 kg)

Career information
- High school: North Shore (Houston)
- College: Texas (1999–2002)
- NFL draft: 2003: 3rd round, 66th overall pick

Career history
- Detroit Lions (2003–2008); Seattle Seahawks (2009); Baltimore Ravens (2010–2011); Indianapolis Colts (2012–2014); Arizona Cardinals (2015)

Awards and highlights
- First-team All-American (2002); Second-team All-American (2001); 2× First-team All-Big 12 (2001, 2002); Big 12 Defensive Freshman of the Year (1999)

Career NFL statistics
- Total tackles: 420
- Sacks: 35.5
- Forced fumbles: 4
- Fumble recoveries: 13
- Interceptions: 2
- Stats at Pro Football Reference

Cory Bartholomew Redding (born November 15, 1980) is an American former professional football player who was a defensive tackle in the National Football League (NFL). He was selected by the Detroit Lions in the third round of the 2003 NFL draft and played college football for the Texas Longhorns. Redding also played for the Seattle Seahawks, Baltimore Ravens, Indianapolis Colts, and Arizona Cardinals.

== Early life ==
He was born in Houston, Texas, the son of Carl Benjamin Redding and Mary Zerlene Brantley.

Redding played football at North Shore High School. In his senior year in 1999, he was named USA Today's Defensive Player of the Year and was a consensus All-American choice. He also excelled in track and field, winning the state Class 5A title in the discus as a junior and senior (career best toss of 193'9").

== College career ==
Redding played college football for the Texas Longhorns at the University of Texas. During his four years there, he was a two-time All-Big 12 Conference selection and played in every game, including a string of 35 consecutive starts on the defensive line.

He finished his collegiate career with 201 tackles (123 solos), 21 sacks (174 yards), and 53 tackles for a loss totaling 249 yards (third on the school's career-record list).

== Professional career ==
Pre-draft measurables
Height	Weight	Arm length	Hand span
6 ft 4 in (1.93 m)	279 lb (127 kg)	33 1/2 in (0.85 m)	10 3/4 in (0.27 m)
All values from NFL Combine

=== Detroit Lions ===
In the 2003 NFL draft, Redding was selected by the Detroit Lions in the third round (66th overall).

He became the starter at left defensive end prior to the 2004 season. In 2005, he played in all 16 games and set a career-high with 42 tackles (29 solo). He emerged in 2006 as one of the best inside pass-rushers in the NFL after moving from defensive end to tackle.

On February 22, 2007, the Lions placed the franchise tag on Redding and he was designated as the team's non-exclusive franchise player. On July 16, the Lions and Redding agreed to a seven-year, $49 million contract. The deal included over $16 million in guaranteed money. The move came amid a bit of controversy, as it made Redding the highest paid defensive end in the league.

Redding was placed on season-ending injured reserve with injuries to his knee and groin on December 12, 2008.

=== Seattle Seahawks ===
On March 14, 2009, Detroit traded him and a 2009 fifth-round draft pick to the Seattle Seahawks for linebacker Julian Peterson. He was expected to play defensive end on 1st and 2nd downs and play defensive tackle on 3rd downs for extra pass rush.

=== Baltimore Ravens ===
Redding signed a two-year contract with the Baltimore Ravens on March 22, 2010.

Redding intercepted a tipped pass by Drew Brees in a week 15 game against the New Orleans Saints on December 19, 2010, to help seal a big win for the Ravens. It was his first career interception. Redding recorded three sacks on the season. In a divisional playoff game against the Pittsburgh Steelers on January 15, 2011, Redding scored his first career touchdown after recovering a fumble by Ben Roethlisberger.

Redding had another solid season in 2011, recording 4 sacks and helping the Ravens defense allow the 2nd fewest yards in the league.

=== Indianapolis Colts ===
Redding signed with the Indianapolis Colts on March 14, 2012.

=== Arizona Cardinals ===
Redding signed with the Arizona Cardinals on March 11, 2015. On October 11, 2015, Redding had an interception against the Detroit Lions that he returned 30 yards. On December 27, 2015, Redding returned an Aaron Rodgers fumble 36 yards for a score against the Green Bay Packers.

In the last game of the regular season against the Seahawks, Redding injured his ankle and was put on Injured Reserve, missing the rest of that game and the playoffs. He was subsequently released on April 18, 2016. He retired on June 29, 2016.

== NFL career statistics ==
Legend
**Bold**	Career high

=== Regular season ===
Year	Team	Games		Tackles					Interceptions					Fumbles			
Year	Team	GP	GS	Cmb	Solo	Ast	Sck	TFL	Int	Yds	TD	Lng	PD	FF	FR	Yds	TD
2003	DET	9	0	7	6	1	0.0	1	0	0	0	0	1	0	0	0	0
2004	DET	**16**	**16**	41	35	6	3.0	6	0	0	0	0	0	1	**2**	0	0
2005	DET	**16**	**16**	33	26	7	1.0	6	0	0	0	0	**4**	1	1	0	0
2006	DET	**16**	**16**	**48**	**38**	10	**8.0**	**12**	0	0	0	0	0	**2**	1	2	0
2007	DET	**16**	**16**	37	27	10	1.0	11	0	0	0	0	1	0	**2**	27	0
2008	DET	13	13	37	31	6	3.0	7	0	0	0	0	0	0	0	0	0
2009	SEA	15	3	20	18	2	2.0	1	0	0	0	0	0	0	**2**	29	0
2010	BAL	15	11	42	31	11	3.0	8	**1**	0	0	0	**4**	0	0	0	0
2011	BAL	15	11	43	29	14	4.5	11	0	0	0	0	2	0	1	0	0
2012	IND	14	14	36	22	14	2.0	5	0	0	0	0	**4**	0	1	0	0
2013	IND	15	15	36	22	14	4.5	10	0	0	0	0	2	0	1	0	0
2014	IND	**16**	**16**	35	20	**15**	3.5	6	0	0	0	0	1	0	0	0	0
2015	ARI	12	0	5	4	1	0.0	0	**1**	**30**	0	**30**	2	0	**2**	**36**	**1**
		188	147	420	309	111	35.5	84	2	30	0	30	21	4	13	94	1

=== Playoffs ===
Year	Team	Games		Tackles					Interceptions					Fumbles			
Year	Team	GP	GS	Cmb	Solo	Ast	Sck	TFL	Int	Yds	TD	Lng	PD	FF	FR	Yds	TD
2010	BAL	2	2	2	0	2	0.5	0	0	0	0	0	0	0	**1**	**13**	**1**
2011	BAL	2	1	5	3	2	0.0	0	0	0	0	0	1	0	0	0	0
2012	IND	1	1	7	**6**	1	0.0	0	0	0	0	0	0	**1**	0	0	0
2013	IND	2	2	7	3	**4**	0.0	0	0	0	0	0	0	0	0	0	0
2014	IND	**3**	**3**	**9**	**6**	3	**2.0**	**2**	0	0	0	0	**2**	0	0	0	0
		10	9	30	18	12	2.5	2	0	0	0	0	3	1	1	13	1
