= Wayne Lucier =

American football player (born 1979)

No. 62
- Positions: Guard; Center

Personal information
- Born: December 5, 1979 (age 46); Amesbury, Massachusetts, U.S.
- Listed height: 6 ft 3 in (1.91 m)
- Listed weight: 300 lb (136 kg)

Career information
- High school: St. John's Prep (Danvers, Massachusetts)
- College: Northwestern (1998–1999); Colorado (2000–2002)
- NFL draft: 2003: 7th round, 249th overall pick

Career history
- New York Giants (2003–2004); Green Bay Packers (2006)*
- * Offseason or practice squad member only

Awards and highlights
- First-team All-American (2002); First-team All-Big 12 (2002); Second-team All-Big 12 (2001)

Career NFL statistics
- Games played: 27
- Games started: 20
- Stats at Pro Football Reference

Wayne W. Lucier (born December 5, 1979) is an American former professional football player who was a center and guard in the National Football League (NFL) for the New York Giants. He played college football for the Northwestern Wildcats and Colorado Buffaloes. He was selected by the Giants in the seventh round of the 2003 NFL draft.

== Early life ==
Lucier attended St. John's Preparatory School in Danvers, Massachusetts. He played both offensive and defensive line in high school, lettering four times. He was named the Super Prep Player of the Year in New England and earned All-State honors. Lucier also letted twice in basketball, garnering All-Conference recognition his junior and senior season. He lettered once in track as well.

== College career ==
Lucier first played college football for the Northwestern Wildcats from 1998 to 1999. He started his first career game at tight end, catching one pass for four yards. He then started the next six games that year at offensive guard. Lucier started every game at right guard in 1999.

Lucier then transferred to play for the Colorado Buffaloes from 2000 to 2002 under head coach Gary Barnett, who was Lucier's head coach during his freshman season at Northwestern in 1998. He sat out the 2000 season due to NCAA transfer rules. He started every game at center in 2001, earning second-team All-Big 12 Conference honors. Lucier was moved back to right guard in 2002, garnering Sporting News first-team All-American and first-team All-Big 12 recognition.

== Professional career ==
Lucier was selected by the New York Giants in the seventh round, with the 249th overall pick, of the 2003 NFL draft. He officially signed with the team on July 16, 2003. He played in 12 games, starting 11, during the 2003 season. Lucier was placed on injured reserve on December 3, 2003. He appeared in 15 games, starting nine, in 2004. He was waived by the Giants on September 3, 2005.

Lucier signed a reserve/future contract with the Green Bay Packers on February 2, 2006. He was waived on August 15, 2006.
