= 2000 All-Big 12 Conference football team =

The 2000 All-Big 12 Conference football team consists of American football players chosen as All-Big 12 Conference players for the 2000 Big 12 Conference football season. The conference recognizes two official All-Big 12 selectors: (1) the Big 12 conference coaches selected separate offensive and defensive units and named first- and second-team players (the "Coaches" team); and (2) a panel of sports writers and broadcasters covering the Big 12 also selected offensive and defensive units and named first- and second-team players (the "Media" team).

== Offensive selections ==
=== Quarterbacks ===
- Josh Heupel, Oklahoma (Coaches-1; Media-1)
- Kliff Kingsbury, Texas Tech (Coaches-2)
- Eric Crouch, Nebraska (Media-2)

=== Running backs ===
- Ennis Haywood, Iowa State (Coaches-1; Media-1)
- Hodges Mitchell, Texas (Coaches-1; Media-1)
- Dan Alexander, Nebraska (Coaches-1; Media-2)
- David Winbush, Kansas (Coaches-2)
- Quentin Griffin, Oklahoma (Coaches-2)
- Ja’Mar Toombs, Texas A&M (Coaches-2)
- Reggie White, Oklahoma State (Media-2)

=== Centers ===
- Dominic Raiola, Nebraska (Coaches-1; Media-1)
- Randall Cummins, Kansas State (Coaches-1; Media-2)
- Seth McKinney, Texas A&M (Coaches-1; Media-2)
- Ben Bruns, Iowa State (Coaches-2; Media-1)

=== Guards ===
- Andre Gurode, Colorado (Coaches-1; Media-2)
- Russ Hochstein, Nebraska (Coaches-2; Media-1)
- Toniu Fonoti, Nebraska (Coaches-2; Media-2)

=== Tackles ===
- Leonard Davis, Texas (Coaches-1; Media-1)
- Frank Romero, Oklahoma (Coaches-2; Media-1)
- Milford Stephenson, Kansas State (Coaches-2)
- Scott Kempenich, Oklahoma (Media-2)

=== Tight ends ===
- Tracey Wistrom, Nebraska (Coaches-1; Media-1)
- Daniel Graham, Colorado (Coaches-2; Media-2)

=== Receivers ===
- Quincy Morgan, Kansas State (Coaches-1; Media-1)
- Robert Ferguson, Texas A&M (Coaches-1; Media-1)
- J. J. Moses, Baylor (Coaches-2; Media-2)
- Antwone Savage, Oklahoma (Coaches-2)
- Tim Baker, Texas Tech (Media-2)

== Defensive selections ==
=== Defensive linemen ===
- Mario Fatafehi, Kansas State (Coaches-1; Media-1)
- Casey Hampton, Texas (Coaches-1; Media-1)
- Justin Smith, Missouri (Coaches-1; Media-1)
- Ryan Fisher, Oklahoma (Coaches-1; Media-2)
- Monty Beisel, Kansas State (Coaches-2; Media-1)
- Reggie Hayward, Iowa State (Coaches-2; Media-2)
- Nate Dwyer, Kansas (Coaches-2)
- Pat Mingucci, Missouri (Coaches-2)
- Kris Kocurek, Texas Tech (Coaches-2)
- Chris Johnson, Kansas State (Media-2)
- Kyle Vanden Bosch, Nebraska (Media-2)

=== Linebackers ===
- Rocky Calmus, Oklahoma (Coaches-1; Media-1)
- Carlos Polk, Nebraska (Coaches-1; Media-1)
- Jason Glenn, Texas A&M (Coaches-1; Media-1)
- Torrance Marshall, Oklahoma (Coaches-2; Media-1)
- Ben Leber, Kansas State (Coaches-2; Media-2)
- Lawrence Flugence, Texas Tech (Media-2)
- Brian Gamble, Texas A&M (Media-2)
- D. D. Lewis, Texas (Media-2)

=== Defensive backs ===
- J. T. Thatcher, Oklahoma (Coaches-1; Media-1)
- Roy Williams, Oklahoma (Coaches-1; Media-1)
- Jerametrius Butler, Kansas State (Coaches-1; Media-2)
- Quentin Jammer, Texas (Coaches-1; Media-2)
- Gary Baxter, Baylor (Coaches-2; Media-1)
- Kevin Curtis, Texas Tech (Coaches-2; Media-1)
- Dyshod Carter, Kansas State (Coaches-2; Media-2)
- Carl Nesmith, Kansas (Coaches-2; Media-2)

== Special teams ==
=== Kickers ===
- Jamie Rheem, Kansas State (Coaches-1; Media-2)
- Kris Stockton, Texas (Coaches-2; Media-1)

=== Punters ===
- Dan Hadenfeldt, Nebraska (Coaches-1; Media-2)
- Jeff Ferguson, Oklahoma (Coaches-2; Media-1)

=== All-purpose / Return specialists ===
- Aaron Lockett, Kansas State (Coaches-1; Media-1)
- J. J. Moses, Iowa State (Coaches-1)
- J. T. Thatcher, Oklahoma (Coaches-2; Media-1)
- Jamaal Fobbs, Oklahoma State (Coaches-2)

== Key ==
Bold = selected as a first-team player by both the coaches and media panel

Coaches = selected by Big 12 Conference coaches

Media = selected by a media panel

== See also ==
- 2000 College Football All-America Team
