= Lawrence Flugence =

American football player (born 1980)

Profile
- Position: Linebacker

Personal information
- Born: June 19, 1980 (age 46); Houston, Texas, U.S.
- Listed height: 6 ft 2 in (1.88 m)

Career information
- High school: Klein (Klein, Texas)
- College: Texas Tech
- NFL draft: 2003: undrafted

Career history
- Carolina Panthers (2003)*; Berlin Thunder (2004)
- * Offseason or practice squad member only

Awards and highlights
- Third-team All-American (2001); 3× Second-team All-Big 12 (2000, 2001, 2002); NCAA Division I FBS record holder for most tackles in a single season (193); Led Big 12 in tackles (2000, 2001)

Lawrence Flugence (born January 19, 1980) is an American former football player. He played college football for the Texas Tech Red Raiders, earning third-team All-American honors in 2001. An undrafted free agent, he was on the roster of the Carolina Panthers of the National Football League (NFL) before being released and subsequently signed by the New England Patriots and ceded to the NFL Europe's Berlin Thunder.

== College ==
Flugence played linebacker at Texas Tech University from 1998 to 2002. While with the Red Raiders, he was named second-team All-Big 12 three times from 2000 to 2002. Additionally, he was named third-team All-American by the Associated Press for the 2001 season. Flugence lead the Big 12 Conference in tackles from 2000 to 2002 and set the NCAA Division I record for most tackles in a single season with 193 in 2002.

== Professional career ==
Flugence went undrafted following his college career, but signed as a free agent with the Carolina Panthers in 2003. He was released in August of the same year, and subsequently signed with the New England Patriots to be delegated to the Berlin Thunder in 2004. He was released from the Patriots roster in September 2004.
