= Justin Gage =

American football player (born 1981)

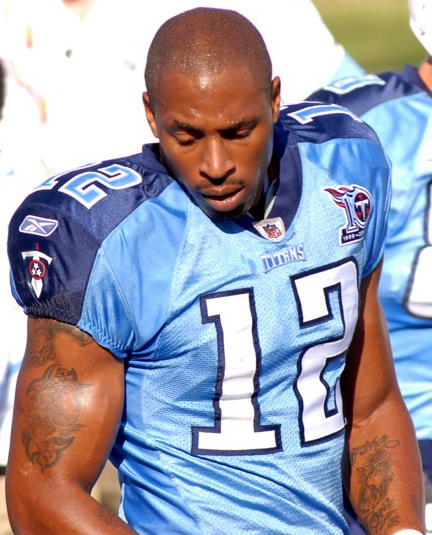
- Gage with the Tennessee Titans in 2008

No. 87, 12
- Position: Wide receiver

Personal information
- Born: January 24, 1981 (age 45); Indianapolis, Indiana, U.S.
- Listed height: 6 ft 4 in (1.93 m)
- Listed weight: 212 lb (96 kg)

Career information
- High school: Jefferson City (MO)
- College: Missouri
- NFL draft: 2003: 5th round, 143rd overall pick

Career history
- Chicago Bears (2003–2006); Tennessee Titans (2007–2010)

Awards and highlights
- First-team All-Big 12 (2001); Second-team All-Big 12 (2002)

Career NFL statistics
- Receptions: 201
- Receiving yards: 2,958
- Receiving touchdowns: 16
- Stats at Pro Football Reference

Justin Charles Gage (born January 24, 1981) is an American former professional football player who was a wide receiver in the National Football League (NFL). He played college football for the Missouri Tigers. He was selected by the Chicago Bears in the fifth round of the 2003 NFL draft. After four seasons with the Bears, he later played another four seasons with the Tennessee Titans.

== College career ==
Gage attended the University of Missouri where he played both football and basketball. He was on the Tigers basketball team that reached the Elite Eight in the 2002 NCAA Men's Division I Basketball Tournament. In football, he started out as a quarterback, but moved to wide receiver in the spring of 2000. Coach Larry Smith converted him to a wide receiver and was fired that year.

He graduated from Mizzou with a degree in General Studies in late 2022, 20 years after leaving the school early to enter the NFL draft. He finished his degree by taking online courses during the COVID-19 pandemic.

=== Records ===
Gage held the following records for football at the University of Missouri at the time of his graduation. All except the record for catches in a single game have since been eclipsed:

- Most receptions, game: 16 (at Bowling Green, 9/14/02)
- Most receptions, season: 82 (2002)
- Most receptions, career: 200 — 1999–2002
- Most yards gained, game: 236 (vs. Baylor, 11/10/01)
- Most yards gained, career: 2,704 (Justin Gage, 1999–2002)
- Most consecutive games with a reception: 34 (2000–2002)

== Professional career ==
Gage spent four years with the Chicago Bears, but signed with the Tennessee Titans as a free agent following the 2006 season. In 2007 Gage tied for the Titans lead with 55 receptions and led the team with 750 receiving yards.

Gage was released by the Titans on September 3, 2011.

== Coaching career ==
In 2021, Gage was hired as the wide receivers coach for CBC High School near St. Louis, Missouri.
