= Jimmy Wilkerson =

American football player (1981–2024)

No. 66, 96, 97, 99
- Position: Defensive end

Personal information
- Born: January 4, 1981; Mount Pleasant, Texas, U.S.
- Died: December 13, 2024 (aged 43); Oklahoma City, Oklahoma, U.S.
- Listed height: 6 ft 2 in (1.88 m)
- Listed weight: 270 lb (122 kg)

Career information
- High school: Paul H. Pewitt High School
- College: Oklahoma
- NFL draft: 2003: 6th round, 189th overall pick

Career history
- Kansas City Chiefs (2003–2007); Tampa Bay Buccaneers (2008–2009); New Orleans Saints (2010); Seattle Seahawks (2011)

Awards and highlights
- BCS national champion (2000); 2× First-team All-Big 12 (2001, 2002); NCAA Division II national champion (2017)

Career NFL statistics
- Total tackles: 179
- Sacks: 14
- Forced fumbles: 3
- Fumble recoveries: 2
- Pass deflections: 8
- Stats at Pro Football Reference

Jimmy Boyd Wilkerson, Jr. (January 4, 1981 – December 13, 2024) was an American professional football player who was a defensive end in the National Football League (NFL). He played college football for the Oklahoma Sooners. He was selected by the Kansas City Chiefs in the sixth round of the 2003 NFL draft.

Wilkerson was also a member of the Tampa Bay Buccaneers, New Orleans Saints and Seattle Seahawks. He died from a heart attack in Oklahoma City, Oklahoma, on December 13, 2024, at the age of 43.

== College career ==
Wilkerson played in 38 games (24 starts) at the University of Oklahoma, amassing 130 tackles, 35 stops for loss, 12.0 sacks 28 quarterback pressures, 13 passes defensed and four forced fumbles.

== Professional career ==
=== Kansas City Chiefs ===
Wilkerson played for the Kansas City Chiefs from 2003 to 2007. On March 18, 2007, Wilkerson re-signed with the Chiefs for a one-year contract.

=== Tampa Bay Buccaneers ===
On March 1, 2008, he signed a two-year deal with the Tampa Bay Buccaneers. He started one of 16 games played in 2008, recording 23 tackles, 5.0 sacks and a forced fumble.

Wilkerson moved into the starting lineup in 2009, starting all 15 games in which he played for the Buccaneers that season. He suffered a torn ACL against the New Orleans Saints on December 27 and was placed on season-ending injured reserve the following day. Wilkerson finished the 2009 season with career highs in tackles (46), sacks (6.0) and forced fumbles (two).

=== New Orleans Saints ===
On April 20, 2010, Wilkerson signed with the New Orleans Saints.

=== Seattle Seahawks ===
Wilkerson signed with the Seattle Seahawks on August 2, 2011.

== Coaching career ==
Wilkerson joined the Texas A&M–Commerce as a pass rush specialist and defensive line coach in 2017.

After Wilkerson's career at Texas A&M Commerce, he became a defensive lineman coach at Carl Albert High School (Mid-Del School District) in Midwest City, Oklahoma.

== NFL career statistics ==
Legend
**Bold**	Career high

=== Regular season ===
Year	Team	Games		Tackles					Interceptions					Fumbles			
Year	Team	GP	GS	Cmb	Solo	Ast	Sck	TFL	Int	Yds	TD	Lng	PD	FF	FR	Yds	TD
2003	KAN	12	0	14	11	3	0.0	0	0	0	0	0	0	0	0	0	0
2004	KAN	15	0	11	8	3	0.5	1	0	0	0	0	0	0	0	0	0
2005	KAN	**16**	2	22	20	2	0.0	2	0	0	0	0	**2**	0	**1**	0	0
2006	KAN	13	1	24	19	5	0.0	3	0	0	0	0	**2**	0	0	0	0
2007	KAN	**16**	2	23	19	4	0.5	3	0	0	0	0	0	0	0	0	0
2008	TAM	**16**	1	23	22	1	5.0	**9**	0	0	0	0	**2**	1	**1**	0	0
2009	TAM	15	**15**	**46**	**29**	**17**	**6.0**	3	0	0	0	0	**2**	**2**	0	0	0
2010	NOR	**16**	0	16	14	2	2.0	2	0	0	0	0	0	0	0	0	0
		119	21	179	142	37	14.0	23	0	0	0	0	8	3	2	0	0

=== Playoffs ===
Year	Team	Games		Tackles					Interceptions					Fumbles			
Year	Team	GP	GS	Cmb	Solo	Ast	Sck	TFL	Int	Yds	TD	Lng	PD	FF	FR	Yds	TD
2003	KAN	**1**	0	3	3	0	0.0	0	0	0	0	0	0	0	0	0	0
2006	KAN	**1**	0	**5**	**5**	0	0.0	**2**	0	0	0	0	0	0	0	0	0
2010	NOR	**1**	0	1	1	0	0.0	0	0	0	0	0	0	0	0	0	0
		3	0	9	9	0	0.0	2	0	0	0	0	0	0	0	0	0
