= Keith Wright (defensive tackle) =

American football player (born 1980)

Profile
- Position: Defensive tackle

Personal information
- Born: June 8, 1980 (age 46); Santa Clara, California, U.S.
- Listed height: 6 ft 2 in (1.88 m)
- Listed weight: 290 lb (132 kg)

Career information
- College: Missouri
- NFL draft: 2003: 6th round, 214th overall pick

Career history
- Houston Texans (2003)*; Indianapolis Colts (2003–2004); Tampa Bay Buccaneers (2004); Arizona Cardinals (2005)*; Tampa Bay Buccaneers (2006)*; Hamburg Sea Devils (2006); Detroit Lions (2006)*
- * Offseason or practice squad member only

Awards and highlights
- 2× Second-team All-Big 12 (2001, 2002)

Keith Wright (born June 8, 1980) is an American former professional football player. He was a defensive tackle in the National Football League (NFL). Wright played college football for the Missouri Tigers and was selected by the Houston Texans in the sixth round of the 2003 NFL draft.

In 2012, Wright was sentenced to life in prison after he was convicted on 19 charges including sexual assault, armed robbery, and kidnapping.

== Biography ==
Wright was drafted by the Houston Texans as the final pick of the sixth round of the 2003 NFL Draft. He signed a contract worth $925,000 for the seasons from 2003 to 2005.

On August 29, 2011, Wright was arrested on suspicion of home invasion and sexual assault in the Natomas neighborhood of Sacramento, California. He was linked to three home invasions that took place in July and August 2011. During one of them, he sexually assaulted a woman and forced her to pull money out of two ATMs.

In October 2012, Wright was convicted on 19 charges including armed robbery, kidnapping, forced oral copulation, first degree burglary, and false imprisonment. On November 30, he was sentenced to 234 years and 8 months in prison.

== Sources ==
- Sportsnet biography
- Career transactions
