= Dyshod Carter =

American football player (born 1978)

No. 26, 35, 22
- Position: Cornerback

Personal information
- Born: June 18, 1978 (age 48); Denver, Colorado, U.S.
- Listed height: 5 ft 10 in (1.78 m)
- Listed weight: 193 lb (88 kg)

Career information
- College: Kansas State
- NFL draft: 2001: undrafted

Career history
- Kansas City Chiefs (2001)*; Cleveland Browns (2001); New England Patriots (2002–2003)*; → Scottish Claymores (2003); Arizona Cardinals (2004); Cleveland Browns (2004); Arizona Cardinals (2005); highlights=: Second-team All-Big 12 (2000)
- * Offseason or practice squad member only
- Stats at Pro Football Reference

Dyshod Carter (born June 18, 1978) is an American former professional football cornerback who played for the New England Patriots in 2003 before being allocated to the Scottish Claymores of the NFL Europe League. Carter also played for the Cleveland Browns and the Arizona Cardinals of the NFL. He signed as a free agent with the Toronto Argonauts of the Canadian Football League (CFL) on April 1, 2008, but was released over a month later on May 12, which was also a few days after his arrest in Colorado (see below). 2003 Scottish Claymores Roster

== College career ==
Carter attended Kansas State University.

== Arrest ==
In May 2008, the Arizona Republic newspaper reported that Carter was arrested in Glendale, Colorado, on cocaine-related charges.
