= 2001 All-America college football team =

Official list of the best college football players of 2001

The 2001 All-America college football team is composed of the following All-American teams: Associated Press (AP), Football Writers Association of America (FWAA), American Football Coaches Association (AFCA), Walter Camp Foundation (WCF), The Sporting News (TSN), Pro Football Weekly (PFW), Football News (FN) and CNN-Sports Illustrated (CNNSI).

The College Football All-America Team is an honor given annually to the best American college football players at their respective positions. The original usage of the term All-America seems to have been to such a list selected by football pioneer Walter Camp in the 1890s. For 2001 the NCAA officially recognized All-Americans selected by the AP, AFCA, CNNSI, FN, FWAA, TSN, and WCFF to determine consensus All-Americans.

== Offense ==
=== Quarterback ===
- Rex Grossman, Florida (Walter Camp, AP-1, CNNSI, FN)
- Eric Crouch, Nebraska (AFCA-Coaches, AP-1 [All Purpose], TSN, FN-3)
- Antwaan Randle El, Indiana (FWAA, AP-2)
- Ken Dorsey, Miami (AP-2)
- David Carr, Fresno State (FN-2, AP-3)

=== Running back ===
- Luke Staley, BYU (Walter Camp, AFCA-Coaches, FWAA, AP-1, TSN, PFW, FN, CNNSI)
- William Green, Boston College (Walter Camp, AFCA-Coaches, TSN, PFW, FN, AP-2)
- Travis Stephens, Tennessee (FWAA, AP-1, CNNSI, FN-2)
- DeShaun Foster, UCLA (TSN-2)
- Larry Ned, San Diego State (AP-2)
- Bruce Perry, Maryland (FN-2)
- Clinton Portis, Miami (AP-3)
- Chester Taylor, Toledo (AP-3)
- Levron Williams, Indiana (FN-3)
- Leonard Henry, East Carolina (FN-3)

=== Wide receiver ===
- Jabar Gaffney, Florida (Walter Camp, AFCA-Coaches, FWAA, AP-1, TSN, FN, CNNSI)
- Josh Reed, LSU (Walter Camp, FWAA, AP-1, TSN, PFW, CNNSI, FN-2)
- Marquise Walker, Michigan (AFCA-Coaches, AP-2)
- Lee Evans, Wisconsin (PFW, FN, AP-2)
- Darius Watts, Marshall (FN-2)
- Kevin Curtis, Utah State (AP-3)
- Ashley Lelie, Hawaii (AP-3, FN-3)
- Billy McMullen, Virginia (FN-3)

=== Tight end ===
- Daniel Graham, Colorado (AP-1, AFCA-Coaches, FWAA, TSN, Walter Camp, FN, PFW)
- Jeremy Shockey, Miami (Florida) (CNNSI, AP-2)
- Chris Baker, Michigan State (FN-2)
- Tracey Wistrom, Nebraska (AP-3)
- Justin Peelle, Oregon (FN-3)

=== Tackle ===
- Bryant McKinnie, Miami (Florida) (Walter Camp, AFCA-Coaches, FWAA, AP-1, TSN, PFW, FN, CNNSI)
- Mike Pearson, Florida (FWAA, AP-1, TSN, FN-2)
- Mike Williams, Texas (Walter Camp, AFCA-Coaches, PFW, FN, AP-2)
- Terrence Metcalf, Ole Miss (Walter Camp, AFCA-Coaches, FN, AP-2)
- Joaquin Gonzalez, Miami (Florida) (FWAA, CNNSI, FN-3)
- Jonathan Goodwin, Michigan (AP-2, FN-2)
- Jon Stinchcomb, Georgia (FN-2)
- Levi Jones, Arizona State (FN-2)
- Victor Rogers, Colorado (AP-3)
- Frank Romero, Oklahoma (AP-3)
- Andy Eby, Kansas State (FN-3)

=== Guard ===
- Toniu Fonoti, Nebraska (Walter Camp, FWAA, AP-1, TSN, PFW, FN, CNNSI)
- Andre Gurode, Colorado (AP-1, TSN, PFW, CNNSI)
- Eric Heitmann, Stanford (AFCA-Coaches, FN, AP-3)
- Fred Weary, Tennessee (AP-2)
- Martin Bibla, Miami (AP-3)

=== Center ===
- LeCharles Bentley, Ohio State (Walter Camp, AFCA-Coaches, FWAA, AP-1, TSN, FN-3)
- Seth McKinney, Texas A&M (PFW, AP-2, FN-2)
- Frank Romero, Oklahoma (CNNSI)
- Luke Butkus, Illinois (AP-3)
- Melvin Fowler, Maryland (FN-3)
- Kyle Young, Clemson (FN-3)

== Defense ==
=== End ===
- Dwight Freeney, Syracuse (Walter Camp, AFCA-Coaches, FWAA, AP-1, TSN, PFW, FN, CNNSI)
- Julius Peppers, North Carolina (Walter Camp, AFCA-Coaches, FWAA, AP-1, TSN, PFW, FN, CNNSI)
- Alex Brown, Florida (Walter Camp, FWAA, AP-1, CNNSI, FN-2)
- Dewayne White, Louisville (PFW)
- Greg Gathers, Georgia Tech (FN-2)
- Chris Kelsay, Nebraska (FN-2)
- Jerome McDougle, Miami (AP-3)
- Will Overstreet, Tennessee (AP-3)

=== Tackle ===
- John Henderson, Tennessee (Walter Camp, AFCA-Coaches, FWAA, AP-1, TSN)
- Wendell Bryant, Wisconsin (AFCA-Coaches, FN, CNNSI, AP-2)
- Ryan Sims, North Carolina (PFW, AP-3)
- Larry Tripplett, Washington (FN, AP-2)
- Alan Harper, Fresno State (AP-2, FN-2)
- Cory Redding, Texas (AP-2)
- William Joseph, Miami (AP-3)

=== Linebacker ===
- Rocky Calmus, Oklahoma (Walter Camp, AFCA-Coaches, FWAA, AP-1, TSN, CNNSI, FN-2)
- E.J. Henderson, Maryland (Walter Camp, FWAA, AP-1, TSN, PFW, FN, CNNSI)
- Robert Thomas, UCLA (Walter Camp, FWAA, AP-1, TSN, PFW, FN)
- Levar Fisher, N.C. State (AFCA-Coaches, AP-1, FN-2)
- Jermaine Petty, Arkansas (AFCA-Coaches)
- Kalimba Edwards, South Carolina (TSN, AP-2)
- Andra Davis, Florida (CNNSI, AP-3)
- Larry Foote, Michigan (FN, AP-2)
- Trev Faulk, LSU (AP-2)
- Ben Taylor, Virginia Tech (AP-2, FN-2)
- Lawrence Flugence, Texas Tech (AP-3)
- Ben Leber, Kansas State (AP-3)
- D. D. Lewis, Texas (AP-3)

=== Cornerback ===
- Quentin Jammer, Texas (Walter Camp, AFCA-Coaches, FWAA, AP-1, TSN, PFW, FN, CNNSI)
- Keyuo Craver, Nebraska (TSN, PFW, FN, CNNSI, AP-2)
- Phillip Buchanon, Miami (Florida) (PFW, AP-2)
- Lito Sheppard, Florida (AP-2)
- Ronyell Whitaker, Virginia Tech (AP-3)

=== Safety ===
- Roy Williams, Oklahoma (Walter Camp, AFCA-Coaches, FWAA, AP-1, TSN, PFW, FN, CNNSI)
- Ed Reed, Miami (Florida) (Walter Camp, AFCA-Coaches, FWAA, AP-1, TSN, PFW, FN, CNNSI)
- Mike Doss, Ohio State (Walter Camp, FN-2, AP-3)
- Tank Williams, Stanford (AFCA-Coaches, FN-2, AP-3)
- Troy Polamalu, USC (FWAA, AP-2)
- Lamont Thompson, Washington State (AP-1)
- Kevin Curtis, Texas Tech (FN-2)
- Eugene Wilson, Illinois (FN-2)
- Michael Lewis, Colorado (AP-3)

== Special teams ==
=== Kicker ===
- Damon Duval, Auburn (Walter Camp, AFCA-Coaches, AP-1)
- Seth Marler, Tulane (FWAA, FN-3)
- Todd Sievers, Miami (Florida) (CNNSI, AP-2)
- Jarvis Wallum, Wyoming (FN-2)
- Travis Dorsch, Purdue (AP-3)

=== Punter ===
- Travis Dorsch, Purdue (Walter Camp, AFCA-Coaches, AP-1, TSN-PK, FN-PK, CNNSI)
- Jeff Ferguson, Oklahoma (TSN, AP-3)
- Dave Zastudil, Ohio (FWAA, PFW, FN, AP-2)
- Brooks Barnard, Maryland (FN-2)

=== All-purpose player / return specialist ===
- Herb Haygood, Michigan State (Walter Camp, PFW, CNNSI-KR)
- Bernard Berrian, Fresno State (AFCA-Coaches)
- Luke Powell, Stanford (FWAA)
- Roman Hollowell, Colorado (TSN, CNNSI-PR)
- André Davis, Virginia Tech (PFW)
- Antwaan Randle El, Indiana (AP-2)
- Keenan Howry, Oregon (AP-3)

== See also ==
- 2001 All-Atlantic Coast Conference football team
- 2001 All-Big 12 Conference football team
- 2001 All-Big Ten Conference football team
- 2001 All-Pacific-10 Conference football team
- 2001 All-SEC football team
