= Kevin Curtis (safety) =

American football player and coach (born 1980)

Biographical details
- Born: July 28, 1980 (age 46); Frankfurt, West Germany
- Education: Texas Tech University

Playing career
- 1998–2001: Texas Tech
- 2002–2004: San Francisco 49ers
- 2004: Green Bay Packers
- 2005: Oakland Raiders
- 2006: Cologne Centurions
- 2006: Houston Texans
- 2007: Cologne Centurions
- Position: Safety

Coaching career (HC unless noted)
- 2008–2009: Navarro College (CB)
- 2010–2012: Louisiana Tech (CB)
- 2013–2015: Texas Tech (DB)
- 2016–2017: Louisiana Tech (CB)
- 2018–2020: SMU (CB)
- 2021–2024: Baylor (CB)

Accomplishments and honors

Awards
- Second-team All-American (2001); 3× Second-team All-Big 12 (2000–2002)

Kevin Curtis (born July 28, 1980) is an American football coach and former safety. He was most recently the cornerbacks coach for the Baylor University football team.

== Early life ==
Curtis was born in Frankfurt, Germany, but was raised in Lubbock, Texas, where he attended Coronado High School. At Coronado, he played quarterback.

== Playing career ==
=== College ===
Curtis played safety for the Texas Tech Red Raiders from 1998 to 2002. He was named second-team All-American for his junior and senior seasons, and was a three time All-Big 12 selection. During the 1999 season, he was named Big 12 Defensive Player of the Week following a Red Raider victory against Colorado and was named to the Jim Thorpe Award watchlist prior to the 2000 season. He graduated in 2002 with a degree in Restaurant and Hotel Management.

=== Professional ===
Pre-draft measurables
Height	Weight	Arm length	Hand span	40-yard dash	10-yard split	20-yard split	20-yard shuttle	Three-cone drill	Vertical jump	Broad jump	Bench press
6 ft 1 5/8 in (1.87 m)	212 lb (96 kg)	33 in (0.84 m)	10 in (0.25 m)	4.55 s	1.57 s	2.62 s	3.88 s	6.75 s	37.5 in (0.95 m)	10 ft 4 in (3.15 m)	24 reps
All values from NFL Combine

Curtis was originally selected in the fourth round of the 2002 NFL draft by the San Francisco 49ers, where he spent three seasons. He has also been a member of the Green Bay Packers, Oakland Raiders, Cologne Centurions and Houston Texans.

== Coaching career ==
=== Early Coaching Career ===
Curtis began his coaching career in 2008 at Navarro College where he served two seasons as secondary coach. He was named cornerbacks coach at Louisiana Tech University under coach Sonny Dykes on February 22, 2010. Dykes was an assistant at Texas Tech during Curtis's college playing career. In his second season at Louisiana Tech, the secondary ranked third nationally in interceptions and pick-6s.

=== Texas Tech ===
In December 2012, Curtis accepted the same position at his alma mater Texas Tech University under former teammate and now head coach Kliff Kingsbury. In November 2015, Curtis was dismissed from Texas Tech.

=== Louisiana Tech ===
On January 15, 2016, Curtis was hired as the cornerbacks coach at Louisiana Tech.

=== SMU ===
From 2018 to 2020 he served as the cornerbacks coach on Sonny Dykes SMU staff.

=== Baylor ===
On February 21, 2021, he was hired as the corners coach at Baylor.
