= Trent Smith =

American football player (born 1979)

No. 48, 87
- Position: Tight end

Personal information
- Born: September 15, 1979 (age 47); Norman, Oklahoma, U.S.
- Listed height: 6 ft 5 in (1.96 m)
- Listed weight: 245 lb (111 kg)

Career information
- High school: Clinton (Clinton, Oklahoma)
- College: Oklahoma (1998–2002)
- NFL draft: 2003: 7th round, 223rd overall pick

Career history
- Baltimore Ravens (2003–2004); San Francisco 49ers (2005–2006); → Cologne Centurions (2006)

Awards and highlights
- BCS national champion (2000); First-team All-Big 12 (2002); Second-team All-Big 12 (2001)

Career NFL statistics
- Receptions: 3
- Receiving yards: 7
- Stats at Pro Football Reference

Darrell Trent Smith (born September 15, 1979) is an American former professional football player who was a tight end in the National Football League (NFL). He played college football for the Oklahoma Sooners. He was selected by the Baltimore Ravens in the seventh round of the 2003 NFL draft. He was also a member of the San Francisco 49ers.

== Early life ==
Smith attended Clinton High School in Clinton, Oklahoma.

== College career ==
Smith played college football for the Oklahoma Sooners from 1999 to 2002. He was redshirted in 1998. He was part of the Oklahoma team that won the national championship in 2000. Smith caught 61 passes for 564 yards and six touchdowns in 2001, earning second-team All-Big 12 honors. He recorded 46 receptions for 396 yards and five touchdowns in 2002, garnering first-team All-Big 12 recognition.

== Professional career ==
Smith was selected by the Baltimore Ravens in the seventh round of the 2003 NFL draft with the 223rd overall pick. He officially signed with the team on July 25, 2003. He was placed on injured reserve on August 25, 2003. He was placed on the physically unable to perform list on August 30, 2004. Smith was waived by the Ravens on September 3, 2005.

Smith was signed by the San Francisco 49ers on September 4, 2005. He played in five games, starting two, for the 49ers in 2005, catching three passes for seven yards. He was waived on November 15, 2005, and signed to the team's practice squad on November 17, 2005. Smith signed a reserve/future contract with the 49ers on January 4, 2006. He was allocated to NFL Europe, where he played for the Cologne Centurions during the 2006 NFL Europe season. He appeared in 10 games, starting four, for the Centurions in 2006, recording 23 receptions for 249 yards and three touchdowns. Smith was released by the 49ers on February 12, 2007.

== Personal life ==
Smith owns Sooner Medical Staffing. He served on the Oklahoma State Board of Education from January 2021 to May 2023. Prior to his stint on the board of education, he worked for the Oklahoma Employment Security Commission.
