= Tank Reese =

American football player (born 1980)

No. 97, 94
- Position: Defensive tackle

Personal information
- Born: October 10, 1980 (age 46); Bartow, Florida, U.S.
- Listed height: 5 ft 10 in (1.78 m)
- Listed weight: 294 lb (133 kg)

Career information
- High school: Auburndale (Auburndale, Florida)
- College: Hutchinson CC (1999–2000); Kansas State (2001–2002)
- NFL draft: 2003: undrafted

Career history
- Kansas City Chiefs (2003); Indianapolis Colts (2004)*; → Berlin Thunder (2004); Colorado Crush (2005)
- * Offseason or practice squad member only

Awards and highlights
- World Bowl champion (XII); First-team All-Big 12 (2002); Second-team All-Big 12 (2001); Big 12 Defensive Newcomer of the Year (2001); Second-team All-KJCCC (2000)

Career NFL statistics
- Games played: 2
- Stats at Pro Football Reference
- Stats at ArenaFan.com

Allen "Tank" Bernard Reese IV (born October 10, 1980) is an American former professional football defensive tackle who played in the National Football League (NFL) for the Kansas City Chiefs. He played college football for the Hutchinson Blue Dragons and Kansas State Wildcats. Reese also had stints in the NFL with the Indianapolis Colts and NFL Europe with the Berlin Thunder.

== Early life ==
Reese was born on October 10, 1980, in Bartow, Florida. He attended Auburndale High School in Auburndale, Florida, where he played football, baseball, track and wrestling. As a senior, Reese rushed for 1,091 yards and was a first-team all-state selection.

== College career ==
Reese played college football for the Hutchinson Blue Dragons from 1999 to 2000 and Kansas State Wildcats from 2001 to 2002. He played two seasons at Hutchinson Community College, earning second-team All-KJCCC in 2000 following an 11 sack year. On December 13, 2000, Reese verbally committed to Kansas State University.

In his first season at Kansas State, Reese had 49 tackles and one sack, earning second-team All-Big 12 and Big 12 Defensive Newcomer of the Year honors. As a senior, he had 62 tackles and 2.5 sacks, garnering a first-team All-Big 12 selection.

== Professional career ==
=== Kansas City Chiefs ===
After going undrafted in the 2003 NFL draft, Reese signed with the Kansas City Chiefs as an undrafted free agent. He played in the first two games of the season but did not record any statistics. On October 1, Reese was signed to the practice squad. On October 14, he was waived by the team.

=== Indianapolis Colts ===
On January 8, 2004, Reese signed a reserve/futures contract with the Indianapolis Colts. On September 5, he was waived.

=== Berlin Thunder ===
On February 12, 2004, Reese was allocated to the Berlin Thunder of NFL Europe. He started in ten games, recording ten tackles and won World Bowl XII.

=== Colorado Crush ===
On January 19, 2005, Reese signed with the Colorado Crush of the Arena Football League (AFL). In seven games, he had five tackles, one fumble recovery and 12 rushing yards.
