= 2002 All-Big 12 Conference football team =

The 2002 All-Big 12 Conference football team consists of American football players chosen as All-Big 12 Conference players for the 2002 NCAA Division I-A football season. The conference recognizes two official All-Big 12 selectors: (1) the Big 12 conference coaches selected separate offensive and defensive units and named first- and second-team players (the "Coaches" team); and (2) a panel of sports writers and broadcasters covering the Big 12 also selected offensive and defensive units and named first- and second-team players (the "Media" team).

== Offensive selections ==
=== Quarterbacks ===
- Kliff Kingsbury, Texas Tech (Coaches-1; Media-1)
- Seneca Wallace, Iowa State (Coaches-2; Media-2)

=== Running backs ===
- Chris Brown, Colorado (Coaches-1; Media-1)
- Quentin Griffin, Oklahoma (Coaches-1; Media-1)
- Darren Sproles, Kansas State (Coaches-2; Media-2)
- Tatum Bell, Oklahoma State (Coaches-2)
- Cedric Benson, Texas (Media-2)

=== Centers ===
- Nick Leckey, Kansas State (Coaches-1; Media-1)
- Zach Butler, Iowa State (Media-2)
- A. J. Ricker, Missouri (Coaches-2)

=== Guards ===
- Derrick Dockery, Texas (Coaches-1; Media-1)
- Wayne Lucier, Colorado (Coaches-1; Media-1)
- Bob Montgomery, Iowa State (Coaches-2; Media-2)
- Rex Richards, Texas Tech (Media-2)
- Taylor Whitley, Texas A&M (Coaches-2)

=== Tackles ===
- Justin Bates, Colorado (Coaches-1; Media-1)
- Jammal Brown, Oklahoma (Coaches-2; Media-1)
- Rob Droege, Missouri (Coaches-1; Media-2)
- Thomas Barnett, Kansas State (Coaches-2; Media-2)

=== Tight ends ===
- Trent Smith, Oklahoma (Coaches-1; Media-1)
- Greg Porter, Texas A&M (Coaches-2; Media-2)

=== Receivers ===
- Rashaun Woods, Oklahoma State (Coaches-1; Media-1)
- Roy Williams, Texas (Coaches-1; Media-2)
- Justin Gage, Missouri (Coaches-2; Media-1)
- Reggie Newhouse, Baylor (Coaches-2; Media-2)
- Wes Welker, Texas Tech (Coaches-2)

== Defensive selections ==
=== Defensive linemen ===
- Tommie Harris, Oklahoma (Coaches-1; Media-1)
- Cory Redding, Texas (Coaches-1; Media-1)
- Tank Reese, Kansas State (Coaches-1; Media-1)
- Kevin Williams, Oklahoma State (Coaches-1; Media-1)
- Jimmy Wilkerson, Oklahoma (Coaches-1; Media-2)
- Keith Wright, Missouri (Coaches-2; Media-2)
- Jordan Carstens, Iowa State (Coaches-2; Media-2)
- Andrew Shull, Kansas State (Media-2)
- Henry Bryant, Kansas State (Coaches-2)
- Ty Warren, Texas A&M, (Coaches-2)
- Tyler Brayton, Colorado (Coaches-2)

=== Linebackers ===
- Teddy Lehman, Oklahoma (Coaches-1; Media-1)
- Derrick Johnson, Texas (Coaches-1; Media-1)
- Terry Pierce, Kansas State (Coaches-2; Media-1)
- Lawrence Flugence, Texas Tech (Coaches-2; Media-1)
- Josh Buhl, Kansas State (Media-2)
- Lance Mitchell, Oklahoma (Media-2)
- Greg Cole, Kansas (Media-2)
- Jarrod Penright, Texas A&M (Media-2)

=== Defensive backs ===
- Terence Newman, Kansas State (Coaches-1; Media-1)
- Brandon Everage, Oklahoma (Coaches-1; Media-1)
- Derrick Strait, Oklahoma (Coaches-1; Media-1)
- Rod Babers, Texas (Coaches-1; Media-1)
- DeJuan Groce, Nebraska (Coaches-2; Media-2)
- Nathan Vasher, Texas (Coaches-2; Media-2)
- Andre Woolfolk, Oklahoma (Coaches-2; Media-2)
- Sammy Davis, Texas A&M (Coaches-2)
- Donald Strickland, Colorado (Media-2)

== Special teams ==
=== Kickers ===
- Josh Brown, Nebraska (Coaches-1; Media-2)
- Adam Benike, Iowa State (Coaches-2; Media-1)

=== Punters ===
- Mark Mariscal, Colorado (Coaches-1; Media-1)
- Kyle Larson, Nebraska (Coaches-2)
- Cody Scates, Texas A&M (Media-2)

=== All-purpose / Return specialists ===
- DeJuan Groce, Nebraska (Coaches-1; Media-2)
- Wes Welker, Texas Tech (Coaches-2; Media-1)
- Terence Newman, Kansas State (Coaches-1)
- Antonio Perkins, Oklahoma (Coaches-2)

== Key ==
Bold = selected as a first-team player by both the coaches and media panel

Coaches = selected by Big 12 Conference coaches

Media = selected by a media panel

== See also ==
- 2002 College Football All-America Team
