= Daniel Graham =

American football player (born 1978)

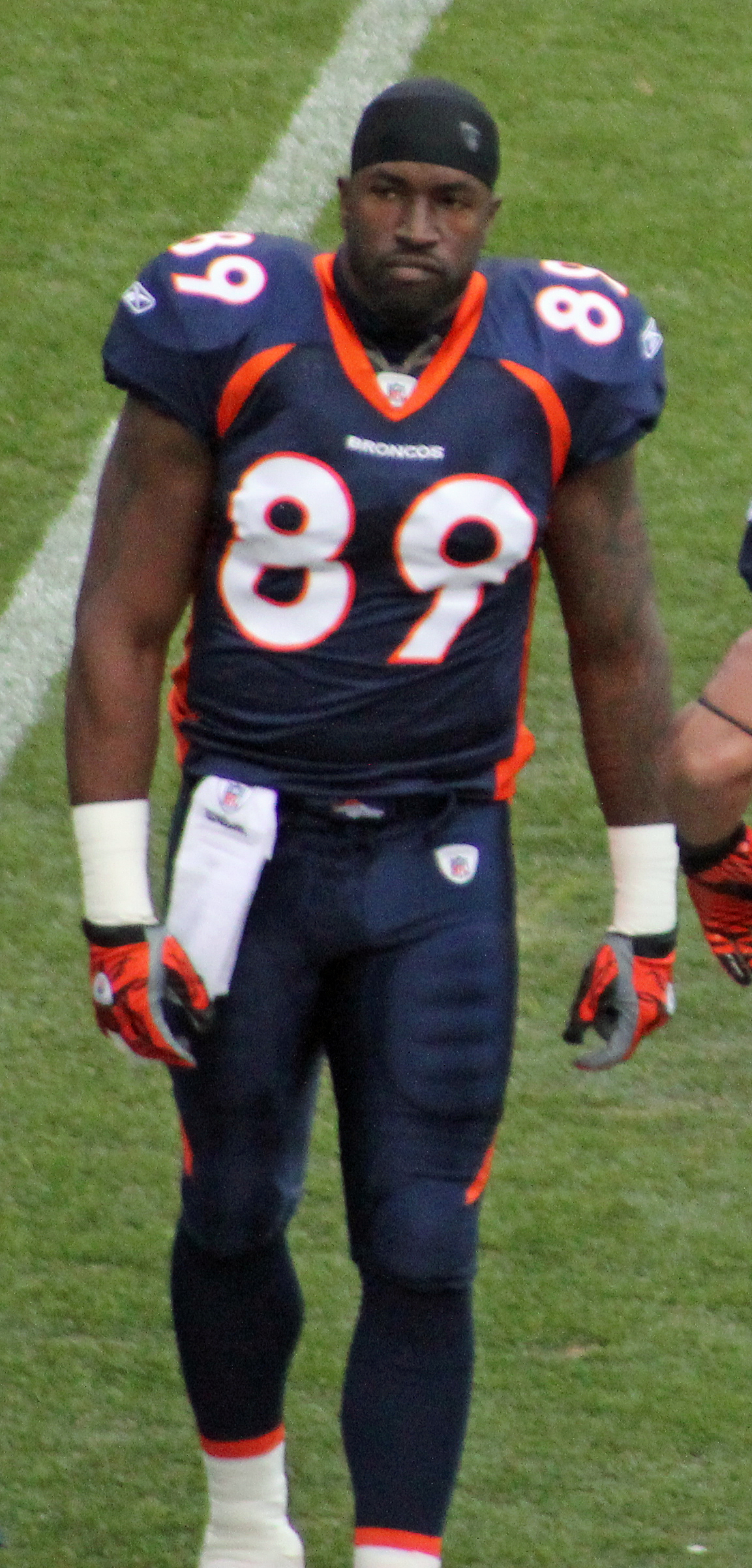
- Graham with the Denver Broncos in 2010

No. 82, 89, 86
- Position: Tight end

Personal information
- Born: November 16, 1978 (age 47); Torrance, California, U.S.
- Listed height: 6 ft 3 in (1.91 m)
- Listed weight: 257 lb (117 kg)

Career information
- High school: Thomas Jefferson (Denver, Colorado)
- College: Colorado
- NFL draft: 2002: 1st round, 21st overall pick

Career history
- New England Patriots (2002–2006); Denver Broncos (2007–2010); Tennessee Titans (2011); New Orleans Saints (2012)

Awards and highlights
- 2× Super Bowl champion (XXXVIII, XXXIX); New England Patriots All-2000s Team; New England Patriots All-Dynasty Team; John Mackey Award (2001); Consensus All-American (2001); First-team All-Big 12 (2001); Second-team All-Big 12 (2000)

Career NFL statistics
- Receptions: 224
- Receiving yards: 2,490
- Receiving touchdowns: 25
- Stats at Pro Football Reference

Daniel Lawrence Graham (born November 16, 1978) is an American former professional football player who was a tight end in the National Football League (NFL). He played college football for the Colorado Buffaloes, earning recognition as a consensus All-American in 2001. He was selected by the New England Patriots in the first round of the 2002 NFL draft, and also played professionally for the Denver Broncos, Tennessee Titans and New Orleans Saints.

== Early life ==
Graham was born in Torrance, California. Growing up in Denver, Colorado, he attended Thomas Jefferson High School. Graham won the Randy Brewer award, which was given to the school's most inspirational player. During his time there, he played the positions of tight end, outside linebacker, long snapper, and placekicker. As a senior, he caught 33 passes for 741 yards (22.45 yards per reception) and six touchdowns, and recorded twelve quarterback sacks and 29 total tackles in just seven games. He also lettered three times in basketball.

At Thomas Jefferson High school and later at the University of Colorado, Graham wore jersey No. 89, the number that former New York Giants tight end Mark Bavaro wore during his pro career. As a child Graham idolized Bavaro, who has since followed Graham's career and has come to befriend him in his adult life.

== College career ==
While attending the University of Colorado, Graham played for the Colorado Buffaloes football team from 1998 to 2001. Nicknamed Grahambo, he was a prolific receiver for the Buffaloes, where he also started two games playing fullback during his freshman season before switching to tight end. After his senior season in 2001, he won the John Mackey Award as the nation's best tight end, was a first-team All-Big 12 selection, and was recognized as a consensus first-team All-American. He finished his college career with 106 receptions for 1,543 yards and 11 touchdowns.

- 1998: 3 catches for 83 yards
- 1999: 19 catches for 264 yards with 4 TD
- 2000: 33 catches for 433 yards with 1 TD
- 2001: 51 catches for 753 yards with 6 TD

== Professional career ==
=== New England Patriots ===
In the first round of the 2002 NFL draft, the Patriots selected Graham with the 21st overall choice. Early in his career he was known for dropping too many passes and suffering apparent lapses of concentration. He improved greatly in this aspect of his playing and also made himself known as an excellent blocking tight end. In his rookie season, Graham recorded 15 receptions for 150 yards, and one touchdown. He added four tackles on special teams. In 2003, he started nine games and recorded 38 catches for 409 yards and four touchdowns. By 2004, Graham was fully integrated into the Patriots' system. He had 30 receptions for 364 yards and seven touchdowns. The Patriots won the Super Bowl at the end of each of these seasons. Graham was named a Patriots team captain on December 6, 2006.

=== Denver Broncos ===
Graham was signed by the Denver Broncos on March 6, 2007. The Broncos awarded Graham a five-year, $30 million contract. The deal included $15 million in guaranteed money that was distributed as a $10 million signing bonus along with a first-year roster bonus of $5 million.

He was voted offensive captain along with quarterback Jay Cutler for the 2008 season.

Daniel Graham was featured on the cover of the October 12, 2009 issue of Sports Illustrated magazine. The cover photo shows Graham cradling the football in his left arm and hurdling an unnamed Dallas Cowboys player during the October 4, 2009 contest where the Broncos defeated the Cowboys by the score of 17–10.

On March 2, 2011, the Broncos released Graham.

=== Tennessee Titans ===
On July 31, 2011, Graham signed a three-year deal with the Tennessee Titans. Graham scored his only touchdown with the Titans and his final career touchdown on September 25, 2011, with a 4-yard touchdown reception from Matt Hasselbeck in the fourth quarter of a 17–14 victory over the Denver Broncos. He was released on June 12, 2012, with two years remaining on an $8.25 million contract. Graham was losing reps to Jared Cook, Craig Stevens and rookie Taylor Thompson.

=== New Orleans Saints ===
On August 11, 2012, Graham signed with the New Orleans Saints. On November 2, 2012, Graham was released by the New Orleans Saints. He retired in August 2013.

== NFL career statistics ==
Legend
**Bold**	Career high

Year	Team	GP	Rec	Tgt	Yards	Avg	Lng	TD	FD	Fum	Lost
2002	NE	12	15	—	150	10.0	31	1	7	0	0
2003	NE	14	**38**	—	**409**	10.8	38	4	**21**	0	0
2004	NE	14	30	—	364	12.1	**48**	**7**	20	0	0
2005	NE	11	16	—	235	**14.7**	45	3	9	**1**	0
2006	NE	12	21	34	235	11.2	29	2	12	**1**	**1**
2007	DEN	15	24	33	246	10.3	28	2	12	0	0
2008	DEN	16	32	**50**	389	12.2	28	4	20	0	0
2009	DEN	16	28	42	289	10.3	24	1	14	0	0
2010	DEN	16	18	37	148	8.2	28	0	5	**1**	0
2011	TEN	16	2	5	25	12.5	21	1	2	0	0
Career		142	224	201	2,490	11.1	48	25	122	3	1

== Personal life ==
His father, Tom Graham, starred at the University of Oregon from 1969 to 1971 where he became the all-time leading tackler in Duck football history and a 2001 inductee into the University of Oregon Hall of Fame. Tom played professionally for the Denver Broncos, the Kansas City Chiefs, the San Diego Chargers, and the Buffalo Bills during the course of an eight-year career as a linebacker.
