= D. D. Lewis (2000s linebacker) =

American football player (born 1979)

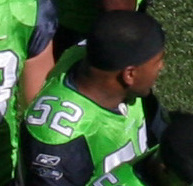
- Lewis in 2009

No. 54, 58, 52
- Position: Linebacker

Personal information
- Born: January 8, 1979 (age 47); Bremerhaven, Germany
- Listed height: 6 ft 1 in (1.85 m)
- Listed weight: 241 lb (109 kg)

Career information
- College: Texas
- NFL draft: 2002: undrafted

Career history
- Seattle Seahawks (2002–2006); Denver Broncos (2007); Seattle Seahawks (2008–2009)

Awards and highlights
- Third-team All-American (2001); First-team All-Big 12 (2001); Second-team All-Big 12 (2000); 1998 Cotton Bowl Classic champion; 2001 Holiday Bowl champion

Career NFL statistics
- Tackles: 208
- Sacks: 1
- Forced fumbles: 2
- Stats at Pro Football Reference

De'Andre De'Wayne Lewis (born January 8, 1979) is an American former professional football player who was a linebacker for eight seasons in the National Football League (NFL), most notably with the Seattle Seahawks and he was their starting middle linebacker in Super Bowl XL. He played college football for the Texas Longhorns, earning All-Big 12 honors twice and setting the school's career record for fumble recoveries. In between two stints with the Seahawks, Lewis also played for the Denver Broncos.

== Early life ==
Lewis was born in Bremerhaven, Germany. His father was in the U.S. Army, and Lewis lived in Germany and Panama for some of his childhood as a result.

He played high school football at Aldine High School in Houston.

== College career ==
D.D. Lewis played college football at the University of Texas at Austin, helping the team to the Big 12 Championship game, where they came one play away from going to the BCS Championship Game, and a Holiday Bowl victory over Washington. He came into the school as a running back, but moved to linebacker in part because he would not get playing time with Ricky Williams on the roster. He was named one of 12 semifinalists for the Butkus Award and set the career and single-season school records for fumble recoveries. In his last three years at Texas he was all-conference honorable mention, Second team all-conference and first team all-conference, respectively.

== Professional career ==
Pre-draft measurables
Height	Weight	40-yard dash	10-yard split	20-yard split	Vertical jump	Broad jump	Bench press
6 ft 1 in (1.85 m)	235 lb (107 kg)	4.75 s	1.62 s	2.73 s	33.5 in (0.85 m)	9 ft 6 in (2.90 m)	24 reps
All values from NFL Combine

=== Seattle Seahawks (first stint) ===
He was not selected in the 2002 NFL draft, but signed with the Seattle Seahawks and played in all 16 games during his rookie season making 24 tackles (four assists). He was re-signed by the Seahawks after the 2003 season. In the 2005 season, Lewis started 12 games and was part of the Seahawks run to the Super Bowl. During Super Bowl XL, he blocked Pittsburgh Steelers quarterback Ben Roethlisberger during a controversial touchdown call. He also had his only career sack in 2006. Lewis was a fine utility player and did what was asked of him. During the 2006 season, D.D. Lewis was instrumental in the development of the Seahawks possibly going to a 3–4 with the addition of Julian Peterson but was denied the opportunity because of the coach's decision. After suffering a turf toe injury, he was sidelined the rest of the year and had surgery. He became an unrestricted free agent after the 2006 season.

=== Denver Broncos ===
On April 26, 2007, he signed a one-year deal with the Denver Broncos. He played five games for the Broncos but did not record a tackle. On October 15, 2007, he asked for his release and it was granted.

=== Seattle Seahawks (second stint) ===
On March 25, 2008, the Seahawks re-signed Lewis to a one-year deal. Lewis played in 14 games in 2008, starting two. He recorded 36 tackles and nine assists. He was also selected as one of the team captains, a high honor amongst coaches and teammates.

Lewis re-signed with Seattle on March 14, 2009, and was the backup for OLB Aaron Curry. He was cut on September 5, 2009, on the final day of roster cuts. The Seahawks re-signed him on September 14 because of salary issues. Lewis played in 12 games in 2009, recording seven tackles with two assists. He suffered an injury-filled year which limited his opportunities to get on the field.
