= Char-ron Dorsey =

American football player (1977–2024)

No. 79, 66
- Position: Offensive tackle

Personal information
- Born: November 5, 1977; Jacksonville, Florida, U.S.
- Died: March 4, 2024 (aged 46)
- Listed height: 6 ft 6 in (1.98 m)
- Listed weight: 388 lb (176 kg)

Career information
- High school: Bolles (Jacksonville)
- College: Florida State
- NFL draft: 2001: 7th round, 242nd overall pick

Career history
- Dallas Cowboys (2001–2002); Houston Texans (2002); New York Giants (2003)*
- * Offseason or practice squad member only

Awards and highlights
- BCS national champion (1999); First-team All-ACC (2000)

Career NFL statistics
- Games played: 12
- Stats at Pro Football Reference

Char-ron Dorsey (November 5, 1977 – March 4, 2024) was an American professional football player who was an offensive tackle in the National Football League (NFL) for the Dallas Cowboys and Houston Texans. He played college football for the Florida State Seminoles and was selected by the Cowboys in the seventh round of the 2001 NFL draft.

== Early life ==
Dorsey attended Bolles School, where he was a defensive tackle and a three-time first-team Class 4A All-State selection. As a junior, he contributed to the team winning the Florida High School Athletic Association state championship in 1995.

As a senior, he registered 70 tackles (40 solo), while contributing to the team being ranked No. 1 in the nation, before suffering a shocking loss in the state final.

He also played power forward in basketball.

== College career ==
Dorsey accepted a football scholarship from Florida State University. As a true freshman, he played in six games at defensive tackle, registering 11 tackles and one sack.

As a sophomore, he was converted into an offensive tackle. He competed for the starting role at right tackle until suffering a season-ending neck injury.

As a junior, he was demoted to third-string after having problems maintaining his playing weight, but eventually earned his way to back up Tarlos Thomas at right tackle in a season when the team won a national championship.

As a senior, he received All-ACC honors and became a starter at right tackle ahead of sophomore Brett Williams, while helping quarterback Chris Weinke win the Heisman Trophy.

== Professional career ==
Pre-draft measurables
Height	Weight	Arm length	Hand span	40-yard dash	10-yard split	20-yard split	Bench press
6 ft 5 5/8 in (1.97 m)	348 lb (158 kg)	34 1/2 in (0.88 m)	11 in (0.28 m)	6.03 s	1.98 s	3.41 s	16 reps
All values from NFL Combine

=== Dallas Cowboys ===
Dorsey was selected in the seventh round (242nd overall) of the 2001 NFL draft by the Dallas Cowboys, after dropping because of a poor showing in the NFL Scouting Combine. Although he was working with the first-unit at left tackle, he abruptly left training camp after feeling pressure from the coaches to reduce his weight (he showed up at almost 390 pounds) and improve his performance, but was later convinced to come back.

Dorsey started the last two games of the season at right tackle in place of an injured Solomon Page. On September 9, 2002, he was waived after not being able to control his weight problems and not getting himself into better playing shape.

=== Houston Texans ===
On September 14, 2002, he was signed by the expansion team the Houston Texans. He was released on November 29, after being declared inactive in 5 games.

=== New York Giants ===
On January 7, 2003, he signed as a free agent with the New York Giants. He was placed on the physically unable to perform list while he recovered from off-season knee surgery. On August 19, he was waived injured after missing all of training camp, while recovering from the surgery.

== Personal life ==
Dorsey worked as a security guard at Andrew A. Robinson Elementary School and as a football coach for the Mentors of Tomorrow (MOT) Cowboys in Jacksonville, Florida. He was named the football head coach at Matthew Gilbert Middle School, building teams that went unbeaten for nearly a full decade. In 2011, he was hired as the head coach at Andrew Jackson High School. In 2013, he resigned after compiling a 6-13 record and returned to Gilbert as the team's offensive coordinator. In 2018, he was hired as the head coach at Terry Parker High School. In 2019, he turned around the football program after a decade of struggles, qualifying for the Florida High School Athletic Association playoffs. He had a chance to coach his son before leaving the school in 2023.

His father Charlie Dorsey signed as a free agent with the Kansas City Royals and was a three-time All-league tight end with the semi-professional Jacksonville Firebirds of the American Football Association.

Dorsey died from complications of a stroke on March 4, 2024, at the age of 46.
