= David Thornton (American football) =

American football player and executive (born 1978)

Indianapolis Colts
- Title: Vice president of player engagement

Personal information
- Born: November 1, 1978 (age 48); Goldsboro, North Carolina, U.S.
- Listed height: 6 ft 2 in (1.88 m)
- Listed weight: 225 lb (102 kg)

Career information
- High school: Goldsboro
- College: North Carolina
- NFL draft: 2002: 4th round, 106th overall pick

Career history

Playing
- Indianapolis Colts (2002–2005); Tennessee Titans (2006–2010)

Operations
- Indianapolis Colts (2012–2022) Director of player engagement; Indianapolis Colts (2023-present) Vice president of player engagement

Awards and highlights
- Second-team All-ACC (2001)

Career NFL statistics
- Total tackles: 736
- Sacks: 5
- Forced fumbles: 10
- Fumble recoveries: 1
- Interceptions: 5
- Stats at Pro Football Reference

David Dontay Thornton (born November 1, 1978) is an American former professional football player who was a linebacker for the Indianapolis Colts and Tennessee Titans of the National Football League (NFL). He played college football for the North Carolina Tar Heels. In 2012, Thornton joined the Colts as the director of player engagement.

== College career ==
Thornton played college football at the University of North Carolina at Chapel Hill, where he was teammates with Julius Peppers, and Ryan Sims. Originally a walk-on for the Tar Heels, Thornton's play eventually earned him a scholarship. In his senior year, he was named second-team All-ACC and team MVP.

== Professional career ==
=== Indianapolis Colts ===
Thornton was selected by the Indianapolis Colts in the fourth round of the 2002 NFL draft. Thornton best season came in 2003 when he led the Colts with 145 tackles and made two interceptions. In the 2005 season Thornton made 83 tackles and two quarterback sacks.

=== Tennessee Titans ===
He became an unrestricted free agent and signed a five-year deal with the Titans on March 13, 2006 . After missing the 2010 season due to a hip injury, he retired on August 5, 2011.

== NFL career statistics ==
Regular season				Tackles				Interceptions						Fumbles		
Year	Team	GP	GS	Comb	Solo	Ast	Sck	PDef	Int	Yds	Avg	Lng	TD	FF	FR	TD
2002	IND	15	0	45	36	9	0.0	1	0	0	0.0	0.0	0	0	0	0
2003	IND	16	16	145	112	33	1.0	5	2	3	2.0	2.0	0	0	0	0
2004	IND	16	15	94	71	23	0.0	1	1	5	5.0	5.0	0	2	0	0
2005	IND	16	16	83	61	22	2.0	1	0	0	0.0	0	0	2	0	0
2006	TEN	16	13	109	87	22	0.0	5	0	0	0.0	0	0	2	0	0
2007	TEN	16	16	122	93	29	1.0	6	0	0	0.0	0	0	0	1	0
2008	TEN	15	15	78	60	18	0.0	6	0	0	0.0	0	0	2	0	0
2009	TEN	11	11	60	46	14	1.0	0	0	0	0.0	0	0	1	0	0
2010	TEN	Did not play due to injury														
Career		121	102	736	566	170	5.0	25	3	8	2.5	5.0	0	8	1	0

== Post-playing career ==
In 2012, he became the director of player engagement with the Colts. In 2023, he was promoted to Vice President of Player Engagement with the Colts.
