= 2000 All-America college football team =

Official list of the best college football players of 2000

The 2000 All-America college football team is composed of the following All-American Teams: Associated Press, Football Writers Association of America, American Football Coaches Association, Walter Camp Foundation, The Sporting News, Pro Football Weekly, Football News, Sports Illustrated and Rivals.com.

The College Football All-America Team is an honor given annually to the best American college football players at their respective positions. The original usage of the term All-America seems to have been to such a list selected by football pioneer Walter Camp in the 1890s. The NCAA officially recognizes All-Americans selected by the AP, AFCA, FWAA, TSN, and the WCFF to determine Consensus All-Americans.

== Offense ==
=== Quarterback ===
- Josh Heupel, Oklahoma (AP-2, Walter Camp, AFCA-Coaches, FWAA, TSN)
- Chris Weinke, Florida State (AP-1, CNNSI, FN, Rivals)
- George Godsey, Georgia Tech (PFW)
- Drew Brees, Purdue (AP-3)

=== Running back ===
- LaDainian Tomlinson, TCU (AP-1, Walter Camp, AFCA-Coaches, FWAA, TSN, PFW, FN, CNNSI, Rivals)
- Damien Anderson, Northwestern (AP-1, Walter Camp, FWAA, TSN, PFW, FN, CNNSI)
- Ken Simonton, Oregon State (AP-2, AFCA-Coaches, Rivals)
- Rudi Johnson, Auburn (AP-2)
- Lee Suggs, Virginia Tech (AP-3)
- Anthony Thomas, Michigan (AP-3)

=== Wide receiver ===
- Marvin Minnis, Florida State (AP-1, AFCA-Coaches, FWAA, TSN, FN, CNNSI)
- Antonio Bryant, Pittsburgh (AP-1, FWAA, Rivals)
- Freddie Mitchell, UCLA (AP-2, Walter Camp, TSN)
- David Terrell, Michigan (AP-2, PFW, CNNSI, Rivals)
- Rod Gardner, Clemson (PFW)
- Quincy Morgan, Kansas State (FN)
- Jabar Gaffney, Florida (AP-3)
- Koren Robinson, North Carolina State (AP-3)

=== Tight end ===
- Brian Natkin, UTEP (AP-1, Walter Camp, AFCA-Coaches, FWAA, TSN, FN, Rivals)
- Todd Heap, Arizona State (AP-2, PFW, CNNSI)
- Tracey Wistrom, Nebraska (AP-3)

=== Tackle ===
- Leonard Davis, Texas (AP-1, Walter Camp, FWAA, TSN)
- Chris Brown, Georgia Tech (AP-1, AFCA-Coaches, FWAA, FN, CNNSI, Rivals)
- Chad Ward, Washington (AP-1, TSN, CNNSI)
- Paul Zukauskas, Boston College (AFCA-Coaches, Rivals)
- Joaquin Gonzalez, Miami (Florida) (AP-2, FWAA)
- Bryant McKinnie, Miami (Florida) (PFW, FN, CNNSI)
- Matt Light, Purdue (PFW)
- Kenyatta Walker, Florida (AP-2, PFW)
- Jeff Backus, Michigan (AP-2)
- Tarlos Thomas, Florida State (AP-3)

=== Guard ===
- Steve Hutchinson, Michigan (AP-1, Walter Camp, AFCA-Coaches, FWAA, PFW, FN, CNNSI, Rivals)
- Russ Hochstein, Nebraska (TSN)
- Bill Ferrario, Wisconsin (PFW)
- Floyd Womack, Mississippi State (AP-2)
- Chris Gibson, Oregon State (AP-3)
- Seth McKinney, Texas A&M (AP-3)
- Kendall Simmons, Auburn (AP-3)

=== Center ===
- Dominic Raiola, Nebraska (AP-1, Walter Camp, AFCA-Coaches, FWAA, PFW, RN, CNNSI, Rivals)
- Ben Hamilton, Minnesota (AP-2, Walter Camp, AFCA-Coaches, TSN, FN, Rivals)
- Casey Rabach, Wisconsin (AP-3)

== Defense ==
=== End ===
- Jamal Reynolds, Florida State (AP-1, Walter Camp, AFCA-Coaches, FWAA, TSN, PFW, FN, CNNSI, Rivals)
- Andre Carter, California (AP-1, Walter Camp, AFCA-Coaches, FWAA, TSN, PFW, FN, CNNSI, Rivals)
- Justin Smith, Missouri (AP-2, FWAA)
- Julius Peppers, North Carolina (AP-2, CNNSI)
- Alex Brown, Florida (AP-3)
- Willie Howard, Stanford (AP-3)
- Cedric Scott, Southern Miss (AP-3)

=== Tackle ===
- Casey Hampton, Texas (AP-1, Walter Camp, AFCA-Coaches, TSN, Rivals)
- John Henderson, Tennessee (AP-1, FWAA, TSN, FN, CNNSI, Rivals)
- Richard Seymour, Georgia (AP-2, Walter Camp, AFCA-Coaches, PFW)
- Gerard Warren, Florida (PFW)
- Mario Fatafehi, Kansas State (AP-2, FN)
- Larry Tripplett, Washington (AP-3)

=== Linebacker ===
- Rocky Calmus, Oklahoma (AP-1, Walter Camp, AFCA-Coaches, FWAA, TSN, CNNSI)
- Dan Morgan, Miami (Florida) (AP-1, Walter Camp, AFCA-Coaches, FWAA, TSN, PFW, FN, CNNSI, Rivals)
- Keith Adams, Clemson (AP-1, Walter Camp, TSN, PFW, FN, CNNSI, Rivals)
- Carlos Polk, Nebraska (AP-1, AFCA-Coaches)
- Levar Fisher, North Carolina State (AP-2, FWAA, FN)
- Adam Archuleta, Arizona State (AP-2, PFW)
- Torrance Marshall, Oklahoma (AP-3, Rivals)
- Anthony Denman, Notre Dame (AP-2)
- Jason Glenn, Texas A&M (AP-2)
- Joe Cooper, Ohio State (AP-3)
- Kalimba Edwards, South Carolina (AP-3)
- Ben Taylor, Virginia Tech (AP-3)

=== Cornerback ===
- Jamar Fletcher, Wisconsin (AP-1, Walter Camp, AFCA-Coaches, FWAA, PFW, FN, CNNSI, Rivals)
- Fred Smoot, Mississippi State (AP-1, Walter Camp, TSN, PFW, FN)
- Tay Cody, Florida State (AP-2, AFCA-Coaches, TSN, PFW)
- Sheldon Brown, South Carolina (AP-3, AFCA-Coaches)
- Lito Sheppard, Florida (AP-2, FWAA, CNNSI)
- Nate Clements, Ohio State (AP-3, PFW)
- Ken Lucas, Ole Miss (Rivals)
- Rashad Bauman, Oregon (AP-3)

=== Safety ===
- Dwight Smith, Akron (AP-1, Walter Camp, AFCA-Coaches, FWAA, FN)
- Ed Reed, Miami (Florida) (AP-1, FWAA, CNNSI)
- J. T. Thatcher, Oklahoma (AP-2, TSN, FN)
- Anthony Floyd, Louisville (AP-2, Walter Camp)
- Mike Doss, Ohio State (TSN, Rivals)
- Hakim Akbar, Washington (CNNSI)
- Roy Williams, Oklahoma (Rivals)
- Robert Carswell, Clemson (AP-3)

== Special teams ==
=== Kicker ===
- Jonathan Ruffin, Cincinnati (AP-1, Walter Camp, FWAA, TSN, CNNSI)
- Jamie Rheem, Kansas State (AP-2, AFCA-Coaches, FN)
- Alex Walls, Tennessee (AP-3, Rivals)

=== Punter ===
- Nick Harris, California (AP-1, Walter Camp, AFCA-Coaches, PFW)
- Brian Morton, Duke (AP-2, FWAA, TSN, Rivals)
- Kevin Stemke, Wisconsin (AP-3, CNNSI)
- Preston Gruening, Minnesota (FN)

=== All-purpose player / return specialist ===
- Santana Moss, Miami (Florida) (AP-1, FWAA, TSN, Walter Camp-WR, AFCA-Coaches-WR, Rivals, PFW, CNNSI-AP)
- André Davis, Virginia Tech (AFCA-Coaches, CNNSI-PR)
- Julius Jones, Notre Dame (CNNSI-KR)
- Aaron Lockett, Kansas State (AP-2)
- Emmett White, Utah State (AP-3)

== See also ==
- 2000 All-Atlantic Coast Conference football team
- 2000 All-Big Ten Conference football team
- 2000 All-Big 12 Conference football team
- 2000 All-Pacific-10 Conference football team
- 2000 All-SEC football team
