= Derrick Gibson =

American football player and coach (born 1979)

Florida Atlantic Owls
- Title: Safeties coach

Personal information
- Born: March 22, 1979 (age 47); Miami, Florida, U.S.
- Listed height: 6 ft 2 in (1.88 m)
- Listed weight: 210 lb (95 kg)

Career information
- High school: Miami Killian (Kendall, Florida)
- College: Florida State (1997–2000)
- NFL draft: 2001: 1st round, 28th overall pick

Career history

Playing
- Oakland Raiders (2001–2006)

Coaching
- Miami Central HS (FL) (2009–2018) Defensive coordinator & defensive backs coach; Miami Killian HS (FL) (2019–2021) Head coach; Florida Atlantic (2022–present) Safeties coach

Awards and highlights
- BCS national champion (1999); First-team All-ACC (2000); Second-team All-ACC (1999)

Career NFL statistics
- Tackles: 196
- Interceptions: 3
- Sacks: 2
- Stats at Pro Football Reference

Derrick Gibson (born March 22, 1979) is an American former professional football player who spent his entire career as a safety for the Oakland Raiders of the National Football League (NFL). He played college football for the Florida State Seminoles before being selected by the Raiders in the first round (28th overall) in the 2001 NFL draft.

== Career ==
=== College ===
An All-American at his hometown Miami Killian High School, Gibson was rated the number-one prospect in the state of Florida by many analysts. He was a four-year letterman at Florida State University who finished his career with 214 tackles, nine stops for losses, seven interceptions and 16 pass deflections.

Gibson participated in three BCS National Championships at Florida State, including the 1999 win over Virginia Tech.

=== Professional ===
Before the 2001 NFL Draft, he was credited with a 4.45 40-yard dash from his Pro Day workout. He spent his entire career for the Raiders from 2001 to 2006.

== NFL career statistics ==
Legend
**Bold**	Career high

=== Regular season ===
Year	Team	Games		Tackles					Interceptions					Fumbles			
Year	Team	GP	GS	Cmb	Solo	Ast	Sck	TFL	Int	Yds	TD	Lng	PD	FF	FR	Yds	TD
2001	OAK	**16**	0	16	15	1	0.0	0	1	9	0	9	4	0	0	0	0
2002	OAK	**16**	11	66	52	**14**	0.0	2	0	0	0	0	**6**	0	**1**	0	0
2003	OAK	15	**14**	**68**	**56**	12	**1.0**	**3**	**2**	**16**	0	**11**	3	**1**	0	0	0
2005	OAK	6	6	35	30	5	**1.0**	1	0	0	0	0	3	0	**1**	0	0
2006	OAK	**16**	1	11	8	3	0.0	0	0	0	0	0	0	0	0	0	0
		69	32	196	161	35	2.0	6	3	25	0	11	16	1	2	0	0

=== Playoffs ===
Year	Team	Games		Tackles					Interceptions					Fumbles			
Year	Team	GP	GS	Cmb	Solo	Ast	Sck	TFL	Int	Yds	TD	Lng	PD	FF	FR	Yds	TD
2001	OAK	2	0	5	**4**	1	0.0	0	0	0	0	0	0	0	0	0	0
2002	OAK	**3**	0	**6**	**4**	**2**	0.0	0	0	0	0	0	0	0	0	0	0
		5	0	11	8	3	0.0	0	0	0	0	0	0	0	0	0	0

=== Coaching career ===
Gibson has since returned to Miami Killian High School as the head football coach. Killian High is a state champion in the 6A classification.

== Head coaching record ==
Year	Team	Overall	Conference	Standing	Bowl/playoffs
**Miami Killian Cougars** () (2019–2021)
2019	Miami Killian	9–3	3–1	2nd	
2020	Miami Killian	4–2			
2021	Miami Killian	12–2	3–0	1st	
Miami Killian:		25–7	6–1		
Total:		25–7			
National championship Conference title Conference division title or championship game berth
