= Snoop Minnis =

American football player (born 1977)

No. 81, 13
- Position: Wide receiver

Personal information
- Born: February 6, 1977 (age 49); Miami, Florida, U.S.
- Listed height: 6 ft 1 in (1.85 m)
- Listed weight: 172 lb (78 kg)

Career information
- High school: Miami Northwestern
- College: Florida State
- NFL draft: 2001: 3rd round, 77th overall pick

Career history
- Kansas City Chiefs (2001–2002); Tampa Bay Buccaneers (2003); Miami Dolphins (2004)*; Toronto Argonauts (2005)
- * Offseason or practice squad member only

Awards and highlights
- BCS national champion (1999); Consensus All-American (2000); First-team All-ACC (2000)

Career NFL statistics
- Receptions: 34
- Receiving yards: 515
- Receiving touchdowns: 1
- Stats at Pro Football Reference

Marvin Dwayne "Snoop" Minnis (born February 6, 1977) is an American former professional football player who was a wide receiver for three seasons in the National Football League (NFL). He also played in the Canadian Football League (CFL) for one season. He played college football for Florida State, earning All-American honors. He was selected by the Kansas City Chiefs in the third round of the 2001 NFL draft and also played for the CFL's Toronto Argonauts.

== Early life ==
Minnis was born in Miami, Florida. He attended Miami Northwestern High School, and played high school football for the Northwestern Bulls.

== College career ==
He attended Florida State University, where he played for coach Bobby Bowden's Florida State Seminoles football team from 1997 to 2000. He led the Seminoles in receptions during his 2000 senior season, received first-team All-Atlantic Coast Conference (ACC) honors, and was recognized as a consensus first-team All-American. He was among the Seminoles' offensive most valuable players, was a finalist for the Fred Biletnikoff Award, and remains tied for the FSU team record for the longest touchdown reception, 98 yards against the Clemson Tigers in 2000. He was ruled academically ineligible for the 2001 National Championship game against Oklahoma.

== Professional career ==
Pre-draft measurables
Height	Weight	40-yard dash	10-yard split	20-yard split	20-yard shuttle	Three-cone drill	Vertical jump	Broad jump
6 ft 0 3/4 in (1.85 m)	171 lb (78 kg)	4.57 s	1.56 s	2.64 s	4.07 s	7.06 s	37.5 in (0.95 m)	9 ft 7 in (2.92 m)
All values from NFL Combine

=== Kansas City Chiefs ===
Minnis was drafted by the Kansas City Chiefs in the third round of the 2001 NFL draft with the 77th overall pick. In his first game with the Chiefs against the Oakland Raiders, he recorded his first career touchdown on what was also his first career reception. It was a 30-yard touchdown reception. He played 15 games for the Chiefs in 2001 and 2002, totaling 515 receiving yards on 34 receptions, including one touchdown. He was released on September 1, 2003.

=== Tampa Bay Buccaneers ===
Minnis was signed by the Tampa Bay Buccaneers on September 24, 2003. On October 8, 2003, he was released.

=== Miami Dolphins ===
On June 24, 2004, Minnis was signed by the Miami Dolphins. He was released on August 23, 2004.

== Nickname ==
Minnis was given the nickname "Snoop" by his mother. "My mom, she said I was always snooping around. Like my son, he's a mess he's into everything," said Minnis. "My momma said I was always into everything, that's why she gave me that name."

== See also ==
- List of NCAA major college football yearly receiving leaders
