= Levar Fisher =

American football player (born 1979)

No. 52
- Position: Linebacker

Personal information
- Born: July 2, 1979 (age 47); Morehead City, North Carolina, U.S.
- Listed height: 6 ft 5 in (1.96 m)
- Listed weight: 238 lb (108 kg)

Career information
- High school: Beaufort (NC) East Carteret
- College: North Carolina State
- NFL draft: 2002: 2nd round, 49th overall pick

Career history
- Arizona Cardinals (2002–2004); New Orleans Saints (2005)*
- * Offseason or practice squad member only

Awards and highlights
- 2× First-team All-American (2000, 2001); ACC Defensive Player of the Year (2000); 2× First-team All-ACC (2000, 2001)

Career NFL statistics
- Games played: 23
- Games started: 15
- Tackles: 68
- Sacks: 1
- Fumble recoveries: 2
- Stats at Pro Football Reference

Levar Depree Fisher (born July 2, 1979) is an American former professional football player who was a linebacker in the National Football League (NFL). He played college football for the NC State Wolfpack. He was with the Arizona Cardinals from 2002 to 2004 and in the off-season of 2005 the New Orleans Saints.

== Early life ==
Fisher attended East Carteret High School in Beaufort, North Carolina, where he was a three-year letterman in football. As a senior, he rushed for 1043 yards on offense, and on defense, made 147 tackles (14 for losses).

== College career ==
A four-year starter for the Wolfpack, Fisher was the ACC's Defensive Player of the Year in 2000 and a first-team All-ACC selection in 2000 and 2001. He finished his career with 492 tackles, 12 sacks and 9 fumbles caused. In 2000, he led the nation in tackles per game with 15.1. He was a 2001 Sports Illustrated first-team All-American LB, with Rocky Calmus and E. J. Henderson.

== Professional career ==
Drafted by the Arizona Cardinals in the 2002 NFL draft, Fisher's career was short lived because of knee problems. He was later signed by the New Orleans Saints and left the NFL in 2005.

== Motivational speaker ==
Fisher currently works as a motivational speaker. He wrote the book Hold On to Your Dreams, published in 2011.
