= 2002 All-Atlantic Coast Conference football team =

American college football all-star team

The 2002 All-Atlantic Coast Conference football team consists of American football players chosen by various selectors for their All-Atlantic Coast Conference ("ACC") teams for the 2002 college football season. Selectors in 2002 included the Associated Press (AP).

== Offensive selections ==
=== Wide receivers ===
- Jerricho Cotchery, NC State (AP-1)
- Billy McMullen, Virginia (AP-1)
- Kerry Watkins, Georgia Tech (AP-2)
- Anquan Boldin, Florida St. (AP-2)

=== Tackles ===
- Brett Williams, Florida St. (AP-1)
- Matt Crawford, Maryland (AP-1)
- Nat Dorsey, Georgia Tech (AP-2)
- Chris Colmer, NC State (AP-2)

=== Guards ===
- Montrae Holland, Florida St. (AP-1)
- Blake Henry, Wake Forest (AP-1)
- Lamar Bryant, Maryland (AP-2)
- Shane Riggs, NC State (AP-2)

=== Centers ===
- Todd Wike, Maryland (AP-1)
- Antoine Mirambeau, Florida St. (AP-2)

=== Tight ends ===
- Sean Berton, NC State (AP-1)
- Heath Miller, Virginia (AP-2)

=== Quarterbacks ===
- Matt Schaub, Virginia (AP-1)
- Philip Rivers, NC State (AP-2)

=== Running backs ===
- Chris Downs, Maryland (AP-1)
- T. A. McLendon, NC State (AP-1)
- Greg Jones, Florida St. (AP-2)
- Alex Wade, Duke (AP-2)

== Defensive selections ==
=== Defensive linemen ===
- Alonzo Jackson, Florida St. (AP-1)
- Calvin Pace, Wake Forest (AP-1)
- Shawn Johnson, Duke (AP-1)
- Nick Eason, Clemson (AP-1)
- Chris Canty, Virginia (AP-2)
- Shawn Price, NC State (AP-2)
- Randy Starks, Maryland (AP-2)
- Bryant McNeal, Clemson (AP-2)

=== Linebackers ===
- E. J. Henderson, Maryland (AP-1)
- Dantonio Burnette, NC State (AP-1)
- Angelo Crowell, Virginia (AP-1)
- Michael Boulware, Florida St. (AP-2)
- Recardo Wimbush, Georgia Tech (AP-2)
- Kendyll Pope, Florida St. (AP-2)

=== Defensive backs ===
- Terrence Holt, NC State (AP-1)
- Jeremy Muyres, Georgia Tech (AP-1)
- Dexter Reid, North Carolina (AP-1)
- Domonique Foxworth, Maryland (AP-1)
- Justin Miller, Clemson (AP-2)
- Brian Mance, Clemson (AP-2)
- Madieu Williams, Maryland (AP-2)
- Jerton Evans, Virginia (AP-2)

== Special teams ==
=== Placekickers ===
- Nick Novak, Maryland (AP-1)
- Luke Manget, Georgia Tech (AP-2)

=== Punters ===
- Brooks Barnard, Maryland (AP-1)
- Chance Gwaltney, Florida St. (AP-2)

=== Return specialist ===
- Steve Suter, Maryland (AP-1)
- Fabian Davis, Wake Forest (AP-2)

== Key ==
AP = Associated Press

== See also ==
- 2002 College Football All-America Team
