= Travis Minor =

American football player (born 1979)

No. 34, 28, 22
- Position: Running back

Personal information
- Born: June 30, 1979 (age 47); New Orleans, Louisiana, U.S.
- Listed height: 5 ft 10 in (1.78 m)
- Listed weight: 203 lb (92 kg)

Career information
- High school: Catholic (Baton Rouge, Louisiana)
- College: Florida State
- NFL draft: 2001: 3rd round, 85th overall pick

Career history
- Miami Dolphins (2001–2006); St. Louis Rams (2007–2008)

Awards and highlights
- BCS national champion (1999); ACC Rookie of the Year (1997); First-team All-ACC (1998); 3× Second-team All-ACC (1997, 1999, 2000)

Career NFL statistics
- Rushing attempts: 307
- Rushing yards: 1,230
- Rushing touchdowns: 8
- Receptions: 67
- Receiving yards: 474
- Receiving touchdowns: 1
- Stats at Pro Football Reference

Travis Minor (born June 30, 1979) is an American former professional football player who was a running back in the National Football League (NFL). He played college football for the Florida State Seminoles. He was selected by the Miami Dolphins in the third round of the 2001 NFL draft and also played with the St. Louis Rams.

== Early life ==
Minor attended Catholic High in Baton Rouge, Louisiana, and won varsity letters in football and track. In football, he finished his high school career with 4,706 rushing yards and 52 touchdowns, and 62 receptions for 1,344 yards and 20 touchdowns. As a senior, he was named the USA Today Offensive Player of the Year. He also won the Gatorade National Player of the Year for the 1996–97 season.

== College career ==
Minor was a four-year letterman for the Florida State Seminoles. He started 33 of the 43 games in which he played, including 30 starts over his final three years. He finished his college career with 3,218 yards rushing and 28 touchdowns on 664 attempts, while also catching 106 passes for 831 yards and three scores and is the school's fourth all-time leading rusher, trailing only Dalvin Cook (4,464), Warrick Dunn (3,959), and Greg Allen (3,769). He led the team in rushing all four years and was a second-team All-Atlantic Coast Conference selection as a senior when he rushed for a career-high 923 yards and five touchdowns on 181 carries, and tallied a career-best 42 receptions for 333 yards. He played in the Senior Bowl following his senior season. Coincidentally, Travis Minor and Warrick Dunn also attended the same high school. (Catholic High, Baton Rouge) He was a sports management major.

== Professional career ==
Minor was drafted in the third round (85th overall) by the Miami Dolphins in the 2001 NFL draft. The St. Louis Rams signed Minor on March 7, 2007, but he was later cut.

== NFL career statistics ==
Legend
**Bold**	Career high

=== Regular season ===
Year	Team	Games		Rushing					Receiving				
Year	Team	GP	GS	Att	Yds	Avg	Lng	TD	Rec	Yds	Avg	Lng	TD
2001	MIA	**16**	0	59	281	**4.8**	**56**	2	**29**	**263**	**9.1**	**29**	**1**
2002	MIA	**16**	0	44	180	4.1	23	2	0	0	0.0	0	0
2003	MIA	**16**	0	41	193	4.7	26	1	4	13	3.3	12	0
2004	MIA	11	**4**	**109**	**388**	3.6	34	**3**	13	75	5.8	20	0
2005	MIA	**16**	0	5	17	3.4	9	0	1	0	0.0	0	0
2006	MIA	**16**	0	19	74	3.9	9	0	3	2	0.7	4	0
2007	STL	14	0	17	68	4.0	13	0	12	86	7.2	20	0
2008	STL	13	0	13	29	2.2	13	0	5	35	7.0	16	0
Career		118	4	307	1,230	4.0	56	8	67	474	7.1	29	1

=== Playoffs ===
Year	Team	Games		Rushing					Receiving				
Year	Team	GP	GS	Att	Yds	Avg	Lng	TD	Rec	Yds	Avg	Lng	TD
2001	MIA	**1**	0	**5**	**14**	**2.8**	**5**	0	**2**	**4**	**2.0**	**4**	0
Career		1	0	5	14	2.8	5	0	2	4	2.0	4	0
