= Byron Thweatt =

American football player and coach (born 1978)

No. 58
- Position: Linebacker

Personal information
- Born: March 21, 1978 (age 48); Petersburg, Virginia, U.S.
- Listed height: 6 ft 1 in (1.85 m)
- Listed weight: 237 lb (108 kg)

Career information
- High school: Matoaca (Matoaca, Virginia)
- College: Virginia
- NFL draft: 2001: undrafted

Career history

Playing
- Tampa Bay Buccaneers (2001)*; Tennessee Titans (2001); Berlin Thunder (2003)
- * Offseason or practice squad member only

Coaching
- Virginia (2006) Graduate assistant; Richmond (2007–2014) Linebackers; Virginia State (2015) Head coach; James Madison (2016–2018) Inside linebackers; Marshall (2018) Inside linebackers; East Carolina (2019) Inside linebackers; East Carolina (2020) Defensive ends, outside linebackers, special teams coordinator

Awards and highlights
- 2× Second-team All-ACC (1999, 2000)

Head coaching record
- Regular season: 6–4 (.600)
- Stats at Pro Football Reference

Byron Douglas Thweatt (born March 21, 1978) is an American former professional football player and college football coach. He was the head football coach Virginia State University in 2015. Thweatt played collegiately as a linebacker at the University of Virginia and professionally in the National Football League (NFL) with the Tennessee Titans in 2001.

== Head coaching record ==
Year	Team	Overall	Conference	Standing	Bowl/playoffs
Virginia State Trojans (Central Intercollegiate Athletic Association) (2015)
2015	Virginia State	6–4	4–3	T–3rd (Northern)	
Virginia State:		6–4	4–3		
Total:		6–4			
