= Tay Cody =

American gridiron football player (born 1977)

No. 27
- Position: Cornerback

Personal information
- Born: October 6, 1977 (age 49); Colquitt, Georgia, U.S.
- Listed height: 5 ft 9 in (1.75 m)
- Listed weight: 180 lb (82 kg)

Career information
- High school: Early County (Blakely, Georgia)
- College: Florida State
- NFL draft: 2001: 3rd round, 67th overall pick

Career history
- San Diego Chargers (2001–2003); Edmonton Eskimos (2005); Hamilton Tiger-Cats (2006–2008)

Awards and highlights
- BCS national champion (1999); Consensus All-American (2000); First-team All-ACC (2000); Second-team All-ACC (1998)

Career NFL statistics
- Tackles: 73
- Interceptions: 2
- Fumbles recovered: 1
- Stats at Pro Football Reference

Coronta "Tay" Cody (born October 6, 1977) is an American former professional football player who was a defensive back in the National Football League (NFL) and Canadian Football League (CFL) for six seasons. He played college football for the Florida State Seminoles, earning consensus All-American honors in 2000. He was selected by the San Diego Chargers in the third round of the 2001 NFL draft, and he also played for the Edmonton Eskimos and Hamilton Tiger-Cats of the CFL.

== Early life ==
Cody was born in Colquitt, Georgia. He attended Early County High School in Blakely, Georgia, and he played for the Early County high school football team. He was listed among the Atlanta Journal-Constitution's "Super Southern 100" as a senior defensive back. He was regarded as one of Georgia's top 50 prospects and received one of the higher grades from Jeff Whitaker's Deep South Football. He was considered the 12th-best defensive back in the country by Super Prep. He recorded 10 interceptions over his final two seasons. He totaled 70 tackles as a senior.

== College career ==
Cody attended Florida State University, and played for coach Bobby Bowden's Florida State Seminoles football team from 1996 to 2000. He was redshirted as a true freshman in 1996. He appeared in seven of the Seminoles' 11 games during their BCS National Championship season in 1999, and earned honorable mention All-Atlantic Coast Conference honors. As a senior in 2000, he was a first-team All-ACC selection and was recognized as a consensus first-team All-American as a defensive back.

== Professional career ==
The San Diego Chargers selected Cody in the third round (67th overall pick) of the 2001 NFL draft. He played three seasons for the Chargers (2001–2003). He joined the CFL's Edmonton Eskimos for one season (2005). He finished his career with the Hamilton Tiger-Cats (2006–2008).

Cody coached football at Bay High School in Panama City, Florida until 2012. He was the defensive coordinator and defensive-backs coach.

== NFL career statistics ==
Legend
**Bold**	Career high

Year	Team	Games		Tackles					Interceptions					Fumbles			
Year	Team	GP	GS	Cmb	Solo	Ast	Sck	TFL	Int	Yds	TD	Lng	PD	FF	FR	Yds	TD
2001	SDG	**14**	**11**	**63**	**57**	**6**	0.0	**1**	**2**	**3**	0	**3**	**5**	0	0	0	0
2002	SDG	4	0	7	6	1	0.0	0	0	0	0	0	0	0	**1**	0	0
2003	SDG	1	0	3	2	1	0.0	0	0	0	0	0	0	0	0	0	0
		19	11	73	65	8	0.0	1	2	3	0	3	5	0	1	0	0
