= Kelly Campbell =

American football player (born 1980)

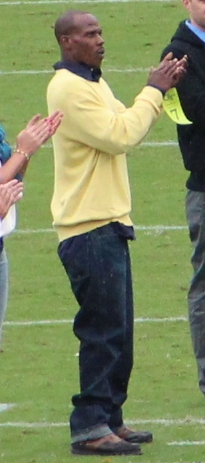
- Campbell in 2013

No. 16
- Position: Wide receiver

Personal information
- Born: July 23, 1980 (age 46); Atlanta, Georgia, U.S.
- Listed height: 5 ft 10 in (1.78 m)
- Listed weight: 175 lb (79 kg)

Career information
- High school: Mays (Atlanta)
- College: Georgia Tech
- NFL draft: 2002: undrafted

Career history
- Minnesota Vikings (2002–2005); Miami Dolphins (2006–2007)*; Edmonton Eskimos (2008); Tampa Bay Buccaneers (2009)*; Edmonton Eskimos (2010)
- * Offseason or practice squad member only

Awards and highlights
- 2× First-team All-ACC (1999, 2001); Second-team All-ACC (2000)

Career NFL statistics
- Receptions: 57
- Receiving yards: 1,062
- Receiving touchdowns: 8
- Stats at Pro Football Reference
- Stats at CFL.ca (archive)

LeVaughn Kelly Campbell (born July 23, 1980) is an American former professional football player who was a wide receiver in the National Football League (NFL) and Canadian Football League (CFL). He was signed by the Minnesota Vikings as an undrafted free agent in 2002. He played high school football at Mays High School in Atlanta, and college football for the Georgia Tech Yellow Jackets.

Campbell was also a member of the Miami Dolphins, Edmonton Eskimos, and Tampa Bay Buccaneers.

== Professional career ==
=== Minnesota Vikings ===
Campbell was signed by the Minnesota Vikings as an undrafted free agent in April 2002. He made the team out of training camp, and went on to appear in six games including two starts for the Vikings during his rookie season despite spending some time on the practice squad. He accumulated 13 catches for 176 yards and three touchdowns on the year.

Campbell started six of the 15 games in which he appeared in 2003. He went on to have the best season of his career, catching 25 catches for 522 yards and four touchdowns. He also carried the ball 10 times for 71 yards and returned five kickoffs for 101 yards. In 2004, Campbell appeared in all 16 games of the regular season for the first time in his career. He started three games and on the year caught 19 catches for 364 yards and a score. He also returned 35 kickoffs for 760 yards.

=== Miami Dolphins ===
After spending 2005 out of the NFL, Campbell worked out for the Miami Dolphins in January 2006. He was signed by the team in March and given a chance to earn the team's No. 3 receiver job behind starters Chris Chambers and Marty Booker. However, a quadriceps injury hurt his chances to impress the coaching staff, and after an injury settlement with the team was reached Campbell was released.

Despite a new head coach in Miami, Campbell was re-signed by the team on March 8, 2007. However, he was let go on July 6, before training camp opened.

=== Edmonton Eskimos ===
On June 2, 2008, Campbell signed with the Edmonton Eskimos. Campbell led the CFL with a 22.6 yards per reception average and he caught 54 passes for 1,223 yards and scoring seven touchdowns.

=== Tampa Bay Buccaneers ===
On January 9, 2009, Campbell signed a one-year contract with the Tampa Bay Buccaneers. He was placed on the IR in August of that year and then later released on October 20, 2009.

=== Edmonton Eskimos ===
Campbell reportedly signed a multi-year contract with the Eskimos at the end of the 2009 CFL season. On June 11, 2010, it was announced that Campbell had rejoined the team and would report to training camp.
