= Robert Carswell (American football) =

American football player (born 1978)

No. 30
- Position: Safety

Personal information
- Born: October 26, 1978 (age 48); Gary, Indiana, U.S.
- Listed height: 5 ft 11 in (1.80 m)
- Listed weight: 215 lb (98 kg)

Career information
- High school: Stone Mountain (Stone Mountain, Georgia)
- College: Clemson (1999-2000)
- NFL draft: 2001: 7th round, 244th overall pick

Career history
- San Diego Chargers (2001–2002)

Awards and highlights
- Third-team All-American (2000); 2× First-team All-ACC (1999, 2000)

Career NFL statistics
- Tackles: 17
- Fumble recoveries: 1
- Stats at Pro Football Reference

Robert Carswell (born October 26, 1978) is an American former professional football player who was a safety in the National Football League (NFL). He played college football for the Clemson Tigers. Was a Playboy Magazine All-American in 1999. He was selected by the San Diego Chargers in the seventh round of the 2001 NFL draft. He attended high school at Stone Mountain High School in Stone Mountain, Georgia. Robert currently resides in Columbia, South Carolina with his wife Demetria. They have one daughter.

== Professional career ==
Carswell played all 16 games his rookie season as a backup to pro bowler Rodney Harrison. In that season he totaled 17 tackles, including 14 solo tackles.

In 2002, he missed most of the team's offseason and preseason festivities with nagging shoulder and knee injuries. After being inactive in four of the team's first six games, Carswell was released by the Chargers on October 15, 2002.
