= Chris Brown (offensive lineman) =

American football player (born 1978)

No. 65
- Position: Tackle

Personal information
- Born: January 21, 1978 (age 48); Augusta, Georgia, U.S.
- Listed height: 6 ft 5 in (1.96 m)
- Listed weight: 329 lb (149 kg)

Career information
- High school: Augusta (GA) Butler
- College: Georgia Tech
- NFL draft: 2001: undrafted

Career history
- Carolina Panthers (2001–2002)*; Chicago Bears (2002)*; Scottish Claymores (2003)
- * Offseason or practice squad member only

Awards and highlights
- Consensus All-American (2000); First-team All-ACC (2000)

Christopher DeMargo Brown (born January 21, 1978) is an American former football offensive lineman. He played college football for Georgia Tech and was recognized as a consensus All-American in 2000.

Brown was rated as the No. 9 offensive tackle available in the 2001 NFL draft by Sports Illustrated, but was not chosen in the NFL draft.

Brown was inducted to the Georgia Tech Sports Hall of Fame in 2010.
