= Jamal Reynolds =

American football player (born 1979)

No. 99
- Position: Defensive end

Personal information
- Born: February 20, 1979 (age 47); Augusta, Georgia, U.S.
- Listed height: 6 ft 3 in (1.91 m)
- Listed weight: 260 lb (118 kg)

Career information
- High school: Aiken
- College: Florida State (1997–2000)
- NFL draft: 2001: 1st round, 10th overall pick

Career history
- Green Bay Packers (2001–2003); Cleveland Browns (2004)*
- * Offseason or practice squad member only

Awards and highlights
- BCS national champion (1999); Lombardi Award (2000); Bill Willis Trophy (2000); Unanimous All-American (2000); First-team All-ACC (2000); Second-team All-ACC (1999)

Career NFL statistics
- Games played: 18
- Tackles: 16
- Sacks: 3
- Fumbles recovered: 2
- Stats at Pro Football Reference

Idris Jamal Reynolds (born February 20, 1979) is an American former professional football player who was a defensive end in the National Football League (NFL) for three seasons during the early 2000s. He played college football for Florida State University, and was recognized as a unanimous All-American. The Green Bay Packers chose him in the first round of the 2001 NFL draft.

== Early life ==
Reynolds was born in Augusta, Georgia. He attended Aiken High School in Aiken, South Carolina. His brother, Rashad Reynolds, helped Aiken High School win a high school football state championship in 1992.

== College career ==
Reynolds attended Florida State University, and played defensive end for coach Bobby Bowden's Florida State Seminoles football team from 1997 to 2000. Following his 2000 senior season, he earned first-team All-Atlantic Coast Conference (ACC) honors, and was recognized as a unanimous first-team All-American. He also won the Lombardi Award, and was a finalist for College Football News' Defensive Player of the Year award. As a senior, Reynolds accumulated a career high 12 sacks and 58 tackles.

== Professional career ==
His strong college pedigree led the Green Bay Packers to select him in the first round with the 10th overall selection in the 2001 NFL draft. The Packers acquired the draft pick from the Seattle Seahawks, in exchange for Matt Hasselbeck and the 17th overall selection in the draft.

Injuries and the emergence of Kabeer Gbaja-Biamila, however, prevented Reynolds from playing the first ten games of his rookie season. He finished his rookie season with four tackles and two sacks. On July 8, 2004, after two seasons in which Reynolds totaled only three sacks and played in only 13 games, the Packers attempted to trade Reynolds to the Indianapolis Colts. However, the trade was declared void after Reynolds failed the Colts' physical examination. Ten days later, the Packers released Reynolds, and he was picked up by the Cleveland Browns, who hoped to salvage the still-young Reynolds' career. Reynolds was cut by the Browns before the beginning of the 2004 season, and has not played in the NFL since.
