= 2000 All-Atlantic Coast Conference football team =

American college football all-star team

The 2000 All-Atlantic Coast Conference football team consists of American football players chosen by various selectors for their All-Atlantic Coast Conference ("ACC") teams for the 2000 college football season. Selectors in 2000 included the Associated Press (AP).

== Offensive selections ==
=== Wide receivers ===
- Snoop Minnis, Florida St. (AP-1)
- Koren Robinson, NC State (AP-1)
- Kelly Campbell, Georgia Tech (AP-2)
- Rod Gardner, Clemson (AP-2)

=== Tackles ===
- Chris Brown, Georgia Tech (AP-1)
- Char-ron Dorsey, Florida St. (AP-1)
- Tarlos Thomas, Florida St. (AP-2)
- Brett Williams, Florida St. (AP-2)

=== Guards ===
- Brent Key, Georgia Tech (AP-1)
- Justin Amman, Florida St. (AP-1)
- Will Merritt, Clemson (AP-2)
- Josh Lawson, Virginia (AP-2)

=== Centers ===
- Kyle Young, Clemson (AP-1)
- Jarad Moon, Florida St. (AP-2)

=== Tight ends ===
- Alge Crumpler, North Carolina (AP-1)
- Mike Hart, Duke (AP-2)

=== Quarterbacks ===
- Chris Weinke, Florida St. (AP-1)
- George Godsey, Georgia Tech (AP-2)

=== Running backs ===
- Travis Zachery, Clemson (AP-1)
- Antwoine Womack, Virginia (AP-1)
- Travis Minor, Florida St. (AP-2)
- LaMont Jordan, Maryland (AP-2)

== Defensive selections ==
=== Defensive linemen ===
- Jamal Reynolds, Florida St. (AP-1)
- Julius Peppers, North Carolina (AP-1)
- Greg Gathers, Georgia Tech (AP-1)
- Terry Jolly, Clemson (AP-1)
- Nick Rogers, Georgia Tech (AP-2)
- Darnell Dockett, Florida St. (AP-2)
- David Warren, Florida St. (AP-2)
- Kris Jenkins, Maryland (AP-2)

=== Linebackers ===
- Keith Adams, Clemson (AP-1)
- Tommy Polley, Florida St. (AP-1)
- Levar Fisher, NC State (AP-1)
- Byron Thweatt, Virginia (AP-2)
- Brandon Spoon, North Carolina (AP-2)
- Brian Allen, Florida St. (AP-2)

=== Defensive backs ===
- Tay Cody, Florida St. (AP-1)
- Derrick Gibson, Florida St. (AP-1)
- Robert Carswell, Clemson (AP-1)
- Alex Ardley, Clemson (AP-1)
- Clevan Thomas, Florida St. (AP-2)
- Adrian Wilson, NC State (AP-2)
- Terrence Holt, NC State (AP-2)
- Jeremy Muyres, Georgia Tech (AP-2)
- Chris Hope, Florida St. (AP-2)

== Special teams ==
=== Placekickers ===
- Luke Manget, Georgia Tech (AP-1)
- Jeff Reed, North Carolina (AP-2)

=== Punters ===
- Brian Morton, Duke (AP-1)
- Keith Cottrell, Florida St. (AP-2)

=== Return specialist ===
- Koren Robinson, NC State (AP-1)
- Kelly Campbell, Georgia Tech (AP-2)

== Key ==
AP = Associated Press

== See also ==
- 2000 College Football All-America Team
