= Nick Rogers (American football) =

American football player (1979–2010)

- Rogers with the Green Bay Packers in 2004

No. 58, 55, 97, 50, 94
- Position: Linebacker

Personal information
- Born: May 31, 1979; East Point, Georgia, U.S.
- Died: May 3, 2010 (aged 30); College Park, Georgia, U.S.
- Listed height: 6 ft 2 in (1.88 m)
- Listed weight: 250 lb (113 kg)

Career information
- High school: St. Pius X Catholic (Atlanta, Georgia)
- College: Georgia Tech
- NFL draft: 2002: 6th round, 177th overall pick

Career history
- Minnesota Vikings (2002–2003); Green Bay Packers (2004); Indianapolis Colts (2004); Miami Dolphins (2005); Colorado Crush (2008)

Awards and highlights
- 2× Second-team All-ACC (2000, 2001)

Career NFL statistics
- Total tackles: 84
- Sacks: 2
- Forced fumbles: 1
- Stats at Pro Football Reference
- Stats at ArenaFan.com

Nicholas Quixote Rogers (May 31, 1979 – May 3, 2010) was an American professional football linebacker who played in the National Football League (NFL) and Arena Football League (AFL). He was selected by the Minnesota Vikings in the sixth round of the 2002 NFL draft.

During his professional career, Rogers took the field in the NFL for the Vikings, Indianapolis Colts, Green Bay Packers, and Miami Dolphins, and in the AFL for the Colorado Crush. He played college football for the Georgia Tech Yellow Jackets.

== Early life ==
Rogers attended St. Pius X Catholic High School in Atlanta, Georgia.

== College career ==
Rogers played college football for the Georgia Tech Yellow Jackets from 1997 to 2001. He was redshirted in 1997. He played on special teams in 1998, recording one tackle. Rogers played in nine games, starting five, in 1999. He spent six games at linebacker and three games at defensive end that season, totaling 36 tackles and 1.5 sacks.

Rogers played defensive end in 2000 and 2001. In 2000, he accumulated 62 tackles, nine sacks and six forced fumbles, earning second-team all-ACC honors. Rogers made 64 tackles and six sacks his senior season in 2001, garnering second-team All-ACC recognition for the second consecutive year. He majored in management at Georgia Tech and graduated in May 2003.

== Professional career ==
Rogers was selected by the Minnesota Vikings in the sixth round of the 2002 NFL draft. He officially signed with the team on July 22, 2002. He played in 16 games, starting 11, for the Vikings his rookie year in 2002, recording 36 solo tackles, 10 assisted tackles and two sacks. Rogers appeared in 16 games, starting five, during the 2003 season, totaling 23 solo tackles, four assisted tackles and one forced fumble. He was waived by the Vikings on September 5, 2004.

Rogers signed with the Green Bay Packers on September 6, 2004. He was then waived on October 16, re-signed on October 19, waived again on November 23, re-signed again on November 27, and waived for the final time on December 21, 2004. Overall, he played in 10 games for the Packers in 2004, accumulating four solo tackles.

Rogers was signed by the Indianapolis Colts on December 22, 2004, and appeared in one game for the Colts during the 2004 season, recording four solo tackles and two assisted tackles. He was waived by the Colts on August 30, 2005.

Rogers signed with the Miami Dolphins on October 19, 2005. He played in three games in 2005 and made one assisted tackle.

Rogers was signed to the practice squad of the Colorado Crush of the Arena Football League on April 23, 2008. He was promoted to the active roster on April 28, 2008. He totaled seven solo tackles, two assisted tackles, 1.5 sacks, one forced fumble and one fumble recovery for the Crush in 2008.

== Personal life ==
Rogers' brother Phillip also played football at Georgia Tech and his sister Dana was on the school's track team.

On May 3, 2010, Rogers died in a single-vehicle automobile accident.
