= 2001 All-Atlantic Coast Conference football team =

American college football all-star team

The 2001 All-Atlantic Coast Conference football team consists of American football players chosen by various selectors for their All-Atlantic Coast Conference ("ACC") teams for the 2001 college football season. Selectors in 2001 included the Associated Press (AP).

== Offensive selections ==
=== Wide receivers ===
- Billy McMullen, Virginia (AP-1)
- Kelly Campbell, Georgia Tech (AP-1)
- Guilian Gary, Maryland (AP-2)
- Javon Walker, Florida St. (AP-2)

=== Tackles ===
- Brett Williams, Florida St. (AP-1)
- Nat Dorsey, Georgia Tech (AP-1)
- Akil Smith, Clemson (AP-2)
- Matt Crawford, Maryland (AP-2)

=== Guards ===
- Todd Wike, Maryland (AP-1)
- Michael Collins, Wake Forest (AP-1)
- Montrae Holland, Florida St. (AP-2)
- Will Merritt, Clemson (AP-2)

=== Centers ===
- Melvin Fowler, Maryland (AP-1)
- Kyle Young, Clemson (AP-2)

=== Tight ends ===
- Mike Hart, Duke (AP-1)
- Willie Wright, NC State (AP-2)

=== Quarterbacks ===
- Woodrow Dantzler, Clemson (AP-1)
- Shaun Hill, Maryland (AP-2)

=== Running backs ===
- Bruce Perry, Maryland (AP-1)
- Joe Burns, Georgia Tech (AP-1)
- Tarence Williams, Wake Forest (AP-2)
- Ray Robinson, NC State (AP-2)

== Defensive selections ==
=== Defensive linemen ===
- Julius Peppers, North Carolina (AP-1)
- Greg Gathers, Georgia Tech (AP-1)
- Ryan Sims, North Carolina (AP-1)
- Darnell Dockett, Florida St. (AP-1)
- Nick Rogers, Georgia Tech (AP-2)
- Corey Smith, NC State (AP-2)
- Nate Bolling, Wake Forest (AP-2)
- Calvin Pace, Wake Forest (AP-2)

=== Linebackers ===
- E. J. Henderson, Maryland (AP-1)
- Levar Fisher, NC State (AP-1)
- Bradley Jennings, Florida St. (AP-1)
- David Thornton, North Carolina (AP-2)
- Chad Carson, Clemson (AP-2)
- Angelo Crowell, Virginia (AP-2)

=== Defensive backs ===
- Chris Hope, Florida St. (AP-1)
- Terrence Holt, NC State (AP-1)
- Tony Jackson, Maryland (AP-1)
- Tony Okanlawon, Maryland (AP-1)
- Michael Waddell, North Carolina (AP-2)
- Jeremy Muyres, Georgia Tech (AP-2)
- Charles Hafley, Clemson (AP-2)
- Shernard Newby, Virginia (AP-2)

== Special teams ==
=== Placekickers ===
- Luke Manget, Georgia Tech (AP-1)
- Xavier Beitia, Florida St. (AP-2)

=== Punters ===
- Brooks Barnard, Maryland (AP-1)
- Mike Abrams, Virginia (AP-2)

=== Return specialist ===
- Kelley Rhino, Georgia Tech (AP-1)
- John Stone, Wake Forest (AP-2)

== Key ==
AP = Associated Press

== See also ==
- 2001 College Football All-America Team
