= Terrence Holt =

American football player (born 1980)

No. 42, 21
- Position: Safety

Personal information
- Born: March 5, 1980 (age 46); Gibsonville, North Carolina, U.S.
- Listed height: 6 ft 2 in (1.88 m)
- Listed weight: 204 lb (93 kg)

Career information
- High school: Eastern Guilford (Gibsonville)
- College: NC State (1998–2002)
- NFL draft: 2003: 5th round, 137th overall pick

Career history
- Detroit Lions (2003–2006); Arizona Cardinals (2007); Carolina Panthers (2008)*; Chicago Bears (2008); New Orleans Saints (2008)
- * Offseason or practice squad member only

Awards and highlights
- First-team All-American (2002); 2× First-team All-ACC (2001, 2002); Second-team All-ACC (2000)

Career NFL statistics
- Total tackles: 244
- Sacks: 0.5
- Forced fumbles: 4
- Fumble recoveries: 6
- Interceptions: 8
- Stats at Pro Football Reference

Terrence DaQuay Holt (born March 5, 1980) is an American former professional football player who was a safety in the National Football League (NFL). He played college football for the NC State Wolfpack before being selected by the Detroit Lions in the fifth round of the 2003 NFL draft.

Holt was also a member of the Arizona Cardinals, Carolina Panthers, Chicago Bears, and New Orleans Saints. He is the younger brother of All-Pro wide receiver Torry Holt.

== Professional career ==
Pre-draft measurables
Height	Weight	Arm length	Hand span	40-yard dash	20-yard shuttle	Three-cone drill	Vertical jump	Broad jump	Bench press
6 ft 1 3/4 in (1.87 m)	208 lb (94 kg)	31 1/4 in (0.79 m)	9 3/8 in (0.24 m)	4.55 s	4.03 s	6.99 s	34.5 in (0.88 m)	10 ft 2 in (3.10 m)	13 reps
All values from NFL Combine/Pro Day

=== Detroit Lions ===
Holt played for the Detroit Lions from 2003 to 2006.

=== Arizona Cardinals ===
On March 8, 2007, the Arizona Cardinals signed Holt to a $15 million, 5-year contract. On February 21, 2008, Holt was released by the Cardinals.

=== Carolina Panthers ===
On March 20, 2008, Holt was signed by the Carolina Panthers, but was released on August 30.

=== Chicago Bears ===
Holt was signed by the Chicago Bears on October 22, 2008, after cornerback Zackary Bowman was placed on injured reserve. He was waived on November 11 when the team promoted practice squad defensive end Ervin Baldwin to the active roster.

=== New Orleans Saints ===
The New Orleans Saints signed Holt on December 3, 2008. He participated in the final two games of the Saints' regular season. He was not re-signed by the team and became a free agent.

== NFL career statistics ==
Legend
**Bold**	Career high

Year	Team	Games		Tackles					Interceptions					Fumbles			
Year	Team	GP	GS	Cmb	Solo	Ast	Sck	TFL	Int	Yds	TD	Lng	PD	FF	FR	Yds	TD
2003	DET	11	2	27	23	4	0.0	0	**3**	42	0	30	**6**	0	**2**	0	0
2004	DET	16	0	28	22	6	0.0	**2**	0	0	0	0	0	**1**	0	0	0
2005	DET	10	10	42	32	10	0.0	0	2	**51**	0	**51**	5	**1**	**2**	**38**	0
2006	DET	16	15	**77**	51	**26**	**0.5**	0	**3**	8	0	7	4	**1**	1	0	0
2007	ARI	16	16	69	**61**	8	0.0	**2**	0	0	0	0	0	**1**	1	0	0
2008	NOR	2	0	1	0	1	0.0	0	0	0	0	0	0	0	0	0	0
Career		71	43	244	189	55	0.5	4	8	101	0	51	15	4	6	38	0

== After football ==
In 2014, Holt launched a construction company with his brother, based in North Carolina.
