= Keith Adams (American football) =

American football player (born 1979)

No. 51, 53, 57, 59
- Position: Linebacker

Personal information
- Born: November 22, 1979 (age 46); Norwood, Massachusetts, U.S.
- Listed height: 5 ft 11 in (1.80 m)
- Listed weight: 238 lb (108 kg)

Career information
- High school: Westlake (Atlanta, Georgia)
- College: Clemson (1999-2000)
- NFL draft: 2001: 7th round, 232nd overall pick

Career history
- Tennessee Titans (2001)*; Dallas Cowboys (2001–2002); → Berlin Thunder (2002); Philadelphia Eagles (2002–2005); Carolina Panthers (2006)*; Miami Dolphins (2006); Cleveland Browns (2007)
- * Offseason or practice squad member only

Awards and highlights
- World Bowl champion (X); Consensus All-American (2000); Second-team All-American (1999); ACC Defensive Player of the Year (1999); 2× First-team All-ACC (1999, 2000)

Career NFL statistics
- Total tackles: 172
- Forced fumbles: 3
- Pass deflections: 2
- Stats at Pro Football Reference

Keith A. Adams (born November 22, 1979) is an American former professional football player who was a linebacker in the National Football League (NFL) for the Dallas Cowboys, Philadelphia Eagles, Miami Dolphins and Cleveland Browns. He also was a member of the Berlin Thunder in NFL Europe. He played college football for the Clemson Tigers, earning consensus All-American honors.

== Early life ==
Adams attended Westlake High School, where he was a two-way player (running back and inside linebacker). As a junior, he had 113 tackles, rushed for 1,500 yards and was named regional offensive player of the year.

As a senior, he tallied 109 tackles, 6 sacks, 4 forced fumbles, 3 fumble recoveries and rushed for 700 yards. His play on defense earned him a selection for the Georgia-Florida All-Star Game, where he had 6 tackles. He also was the state runner up in wrestling and clocked 10.8 seconds in the 100 metres.

== College career ==
Adams accepted a football scholarship from Clemson University. As a freshman in 1998, he was a backup at linebacker.

As a sophomore in 1999, he was named a starter at outside linebacker. He registered 186 tackles (led the nation and set school record), 35 tackles for loss (led the nation and set school record) and 16 sacks (second in the nation and set school record). He set a school record with 27 tackles against the University of South Carolina. He set school records with 4 sacks and 6 tackles for loss against Duke University. He had 10 tackles and received the defensive MVP award against Mississippi State University in the 1999 Peach Bowl. He earned first-team All-ACC, the ACC Defensive Player of the Year, and second-team All-American honors.

As a junior in 2000, he recorded 138 tackles (second on the team), 18 tackles for loss (led the team), 6 sacks, 19 quarterback pressures (led the team), 4 forced fumbles (led the team) and one interception. He received first-team All-ACC and consensus first-team All-American honors.

At the end of his junior season he declared his intention to enter the NFL draft, finishing his college career after playing in 35 games, ranking sixth in school history in career tackles (379), third in career tackles for loss (54), third in career sacks (23), number one in tackles in a game, number one in tackles in a season, number one in sacks in a game (4), number one in sacks in a season (16), number one in tackles for loss in a game (6) and number one in tackles for loss in a season (35).

In 2011, he was inducted into the Clemson Athletic Hall of Fame.

== Professional career ==
=== Tennessee Titans ===
Adams was selected by the Tennessee Titans in the seventh round (232nd overall) of the 2001 NFL draft, after dropping because of his size. He played throughout the preseason, but was a roster cut on August 31.

=== Dallas Cowboys ===
On November 8, 2001, He was signed by the Dallas Cowboys to their practice squad. On November 21, he was promoted to the active roster. He played in four games on special teams and was declared inactive for the last 3 contests. He collected 3 special teams tackles.

In 2002, he was allocated to NFL Europa and played in ten games for the Berlin Thunder, finishing with 55 tackles (second on the team), one sack. He helped the Thunder reach World Bowl X and win their second consecutive Championship.

He began the NFL season with the Cowboys and started 5 games at middle linebacker, replacing an injured Dat Nguyen and registering 27 tackles. After head coach Dave Campo decided to start Markus Steele in his place, he was waived on October 22, to make room for guard Jeremy McKinney. He finished with 27 tackles (2 for loss), one quarterback pressure and 4 special teams tackles.

=== Philadelphia Eagles ===
On October 21, 2002, the Philadelphia Eagles released linebacker Quinton Caver to claim Adams off waivers. He played mainly on special teams under then assistant coach John Harbaugh.

In 2003, he played in 15 games, leading the NFC in special teams tackles (30).

In 2004, he played in all 16 regular season games, making two starts. He recorded 54 defensive tackles and 24 special teams tackles (second on the team). He started at weakside linebacker in place of an injured Mark Simoneau, in three postseason games, but returned to a reserve role in Super Bowl XXXIX.

In 2006, he was named the starter at weakside linebacker over Mark Simoneau, playing in all 16 games and registering a career-high 101 tackles.

=== Carolina Panthers ===
On April 13, 2006, he signed with the Carolina Panthers as an unrestricted free agent. He was released on September 2.

=== Miami Dolphins ===
On September 4, 2006, he was signed by the Miami Dolphins. He wasn't re-signed at the end of the season.

=== Cleveland Browns ===
On December 12, 2007, he signed with the Cleveland Browns as a free agent. He wasn't re-signed at the end of the season.

== NFL career statistics ==
Legend
**Bold**	Career high

=== Regular season ===
Year	Team	Games		Tackles					Interceptions					Fumbles			
Year	Team	GP	GS	Cmb	Solo	Ast	Sck	TFL	Int	Yds	TD	Lng	PD	FF	FR	Yds	TD
2001	DAL	4	0	1	1	0	0.0	0	0	0	0	0	0	0	0	0	0
2002	DAL	6	5	19	16	3	0.0	2	0	0	0	0	0	0	0	0	0
2002	PHI	10	0	9	7	2	0.0	0	0	0	0	0	0	0	0	0	0
2003	PHI	15	0	19	17	2	0.0	0	0	0	0	0	0	0	0	0	0
2004	PHI	**16**	2	48	42	6	0.0	**3**	0	0	0	0	**1**	**2**	0	0	0
2005	PHI	**16**	**16**	**69**	**59**	**10**	0.0	**3**	0	0	0	0	**1**	0	0	0	0
2006	MIA	15	0	6	4	2	0.0	0	0	0	0	0	0	1	0	0	0
2007	CLE	3	0	1	1	0	0.0	0	0	0	0	0	0	0	0	0	0
Career		85	23	172	147	25	0.0	8	0	0	0	0	2	3	0	0	0

=== Playoffs ===
Year	Team	Games		Tackles					Interceptions					Fumbles			
Year	Team	GP	GS	Cmb	Solo	Ast	Sck	TFL	Int	Yds	TD	Lng	PD	FF	FR	Yds	TD
2002	PHI	2	0	3	3	0	0.0	0	0	0	0	0	0	0	0	0	0
2003	PHI	2	0	4	4	0	0.0	0	0	0	0	0	0	0	0	0	0
2004	PHI	**3**	**2**	**11**	**10**	**1**	0.0	0	0	0	0	0	**1**	0	0	0	0
Career		7	2	18	17	1	0.0	0	0	0	0	0	1	0	0	0	0

== Personal life ==
His father is 15-year NFL veteran Julius Adams, who played for the New England Patriots. He majored in parks, recreation and tourism management, and returned to Clemson to complete his bachelor's degree and graduate in 2013. He is married to Raya Adams.
