= Nat Dorsey =

American football player (born 1983)

No. 65, 74, 70
- Position: Offensive tackle

Personal information
- Born: September 9, 1983 (age 43); New Orleans, Louisiana, U.S.
- Listed height: 6 ft 7 in (2.01 m)
- Listed weight: 335 lb (152 kg)

Career information
- High school: St. Augustine (New Orleans)
- College: Georgia Tech
- NFL draft: 2004: 4th round, 115th overall pick

Career history
- Minnesota Vikings (2004); Cleveland Browns (2005–2007)

Awards and highlights
- First-team All-ACC (2001); Second-team All-ACC (2002)

Career NFL statistics
- Games played: 40
- Games started: 9
- Stats at Pro Football Reference

Nathaniel Willie Dorsey III (born September 9, 1983) is an American former professional football player who was an offensive tackle in the National Football League (NFL). He played college football for the Georgia Tech Yellow Jackets and was selected by the Minnesota Vikings in the fourth round of the 2004 NFL draft.

== Early life ==
Dorsey attended St. Augustine High.

== College career ==
Dorsey played college football at Georgia Tech for the Yellow Jackets. He majored in management.

== Professional career ==
=== Minnesota Vikings ===
Dorsey was selected by the Minnesota Vikings in the fourth round (115th overall) of the 2004 NFL draft. He played in 13 games with seven starts in his rookie season and made his NFL debut versus the Chicago Bears on September 26.

=== Cleveland Browns ===
On September 4, 2005, he was traded to the Cleveland Browns and appeared in nine games that season.

He played in 13 games with two starts for the Browns in 2006.

He played in 5 games for the Browns in 2007.
