= 1999 All-Atlantic Coast Conference football team =

American college football all-star team

The 1999 All-Atlantic Coast Conference football team consists of American football players chosen by various selectors for their All-Atlantic Coast Conference ("ACC") teams for the 1999 college football season. Selectors in 1999 included the Associated Press (AP).

== Offensive selections ==
=== Wide receivers ===
- Peter Warrick, Florida State (AP-1)
- Kelly Campbell, Georgia Tech (AP-1)
- Rod Gardner, Clemson (AP-2)
- Dez White, Georgia Tech (AP-2)

=== Tackles ===
- Jon Carman, Georgia Tech (AP-1)
- Tarlos Thomas, Florida St. (AP-1)
- Brad Messina, Maryland (AP-2)
- Brett Williams, Florida St. (AP-2)

=== Guards ===
- Noel LaMontagne, Virginia (AP-1)
- Jason Whitaker, Florida State (AP-1)
- Jason Burks, Georgia Tech (AP-2)
- Jamie Wu, Maryland (AP-2)

=== Centers ===
- John St. Clair, Virginia (AP-1)
- Eric Thomas, Florida St. (AP-2)

=== Tight ends ===
- Alge Crumpler, North Carolina (AP-1)
- John Waerig, Maryland (AP-2)

=== Quarterbacks ===
- Joe Hamilton, Georgia Tech (AP-1)
- Chris Weinke, Florida St. (AP-2)

=== Running backs ===
- Thomas Jones, Virginia (AP-1)
- LaMont Jordan, Maryland (AP-1)
- Morgan Kane, Wake Forest (AP-2)
- Travis Minor, Florida State (AP-2)

== Defensive selections ==
=== Defensive linemen ===
- Corey Simon, Florida State (AP-1)
- Chris Combs, Duke (AP-1)
- Jerry Johnson, Florida St. (AP-1)
- Delbert Cowsette, Maryland (AP-1)
- Fred Robbins, Wake Forest (AP-2)
- Jamal Reynolds, Florida St. (AP-2)
- Bryan Ray, Wake Forest (AP-2)
- Terry Jolly, Clemson (AP-2)

=== Linebackers ===
- Keith Adams, Clemson (AP-1)
- Tommy Polley, Florida St. (AP-1)
- Dustin Lyman, Wake Forest (AP-1)
- Brian Allen, Florida St. (AP-2)
- Shannon Taylor, Virginia (AP-2)
- Byron Thweatt, Virginia (AP-2)

=== Defensive backs ===
- Robert Carswell, Clemson (AP-1)
- Lloyd Harrison, NC State (AP-1)
- Mario Edwards, Florida State (AP-1)
- Lewis Sanders, Maryland (AP-1)
- Derrick Gibson, Florida St. (AP-2)
- Tony Scott, NC State (AP-2)
- Travares Tillman, Georgia Tech (AP-2)
- Dextra Polite, Clemson (AP-2)

== Special teams ==
=== Placekickers ===
- Sebastian Janikowski, Florida State (AP-1)
- Sims Lenhardt, Duke (AP-2)

=== Punters ===
- Brian Schmitz, North Carolina (AP-1)
- Brian Morton, Duke (AP-2)

=== Return specialist ===
- Peter Warrick, Florida St. (AP-1)
- Scottie Montgomery, Duke (AP-2)

== Key ==
AP = Associated Press

== See also ==
- 1999 College Football All-America Team
