= Rod Gardner =

American football player (born 1977)

No. 82, 85, 87
- Position: Wide receiver

Personal information
- Born: October 26, 1977 (age 49); Jacksonville, Florida, U.S.
- Listed height: 6 ft 2 in (1.88 m)
- Listed weight: 215 lb (98 kg)

Career information
- High school: Raines (Jacksonville)
- College: Clemson (1997–2000)
- NFL draft: 2001: 1st round, 15th overall pick

Career history
- Washington Redskins (2001–2004); Carolina Panthers (2005); Green Bay Packers (2005); Kansas City Chiefs (2006)

Awards and highlights
- 2× Second-team All-ACC (1999, 2000)

Career NFL statistics
- Receptions: 242
- Receiving yards: 3,165
- Receiving touchdowns: 23
- Stats at Pro Football Reference

Roderick F. Gardner (born October 26, 1977) is an American former professional football player who was a wide receiver in the National Football League (NFL) for six seasons. He played college football for the Clemson Tigers.

== College career ==
Gardner played college football at Clemson University, where he started as a quarterback and safety on the practice squad (as a true freshman) before switching to wide receiver his sophomore year. He was selected as a second team All-ACC during his junior year after setting the school record for catches, yards, and receptions per game. His senior year, he not only made first team All-ACC, but was a first team All-American as well. In 2000, he was one of the ten finalists for the Biletnikoff Award after posting six touchdowns on 51 receptions and 956 yards.

== Professional career ==
Pre-draft measurables
Height	Weight	Arm length	Hand span	40-yard dash	Vertical jump
6 ft 2 1/4 in (1.89 m)	219 lb (99 kg)	33 in (0.84 m)	10 in (0.25 m)	4.48 s	36.0 in (0.91 m)
All values from NFL Combine

=== Washington Redskins ===
Gardner was chosen by the Washington Redskins with the 15th overall selection in the first round of the 2001 NFL draft. During his rookie year, he was selected as NFC Offensive Player of the Week after a 208-yard, one touchdown performance against the Carolina Panthers. His history at quarterback would lead the Redskins to utilize him on trick plays during games; during the 2003 NFL season he was 2-for-3 for 46 yards and two passing touchdowns (to Chad Morton and Trung Canidate).

=== Carolina Panthers ===
After four seasons in Washington, he was traded to the Carolina Panthers during the 2005 offseason for a sixth-round pick in the 2006 NFL draft. He spent most of the season fourth on the Panthers' depth chart, behind Steve Smith, Keary Colbert, and Ricky Proehl.

=== Green Bay Packers ===
Gardner was waived by the Panthers on December 16, 2005, and he was then signed by the Green Bay Packers on December 19, 2005. He re-signed with Green Bay on March 21, 2006. On September 2, 2006, Gardner was waived by the Packers.

=== Kansas City Chiefs ===
In September 2006, he signed a three-year contract with the Kansas City Chiefs. In 2006 with the Chiefs, he only had 2 receptions for 17 yards. He was released before the 2007 season.

=== NFL statistics ===
Year	Team	GP	Receiving						Rushing					
Year	Team	GP	Rec	Yds	Avg	Lng	TD	FD	Att	Yds	Avg	Lng	TD	FD
2001	WSH	16	46	741	16.1	85	4	28	1	16	16.0	16	0	1
2002	WSH	16	71	1,006	14.2	43	8	51	1	1	1.0	1	0	0
2003	WSH	16	59	600	10.2	35	5	30	—	—	—	—	—	—
2004	WSH	16	51	650	12.7	51	5	30	3	7	2.3	11	0	2
2005	CAR	11	9	84	9.3	15	1	4	—	—	—	—	—	—
2005	GB	2	4	67	16.8	33	0	4	—	—	—	—	—	—
2006	KC	14	2	17	8.5	13	0	1	—	—	—	—	—	—
Career		91	242	3,165	13.1	85	23	148	5	24	4.8	16	0	3

== Personal life ==
Gardner competed on the thirty-sixth season of the American reality competition show The Amazing Race with his wife Leticia, finishing in third place.
