= Julius Peppers =

American football player (born 1980)

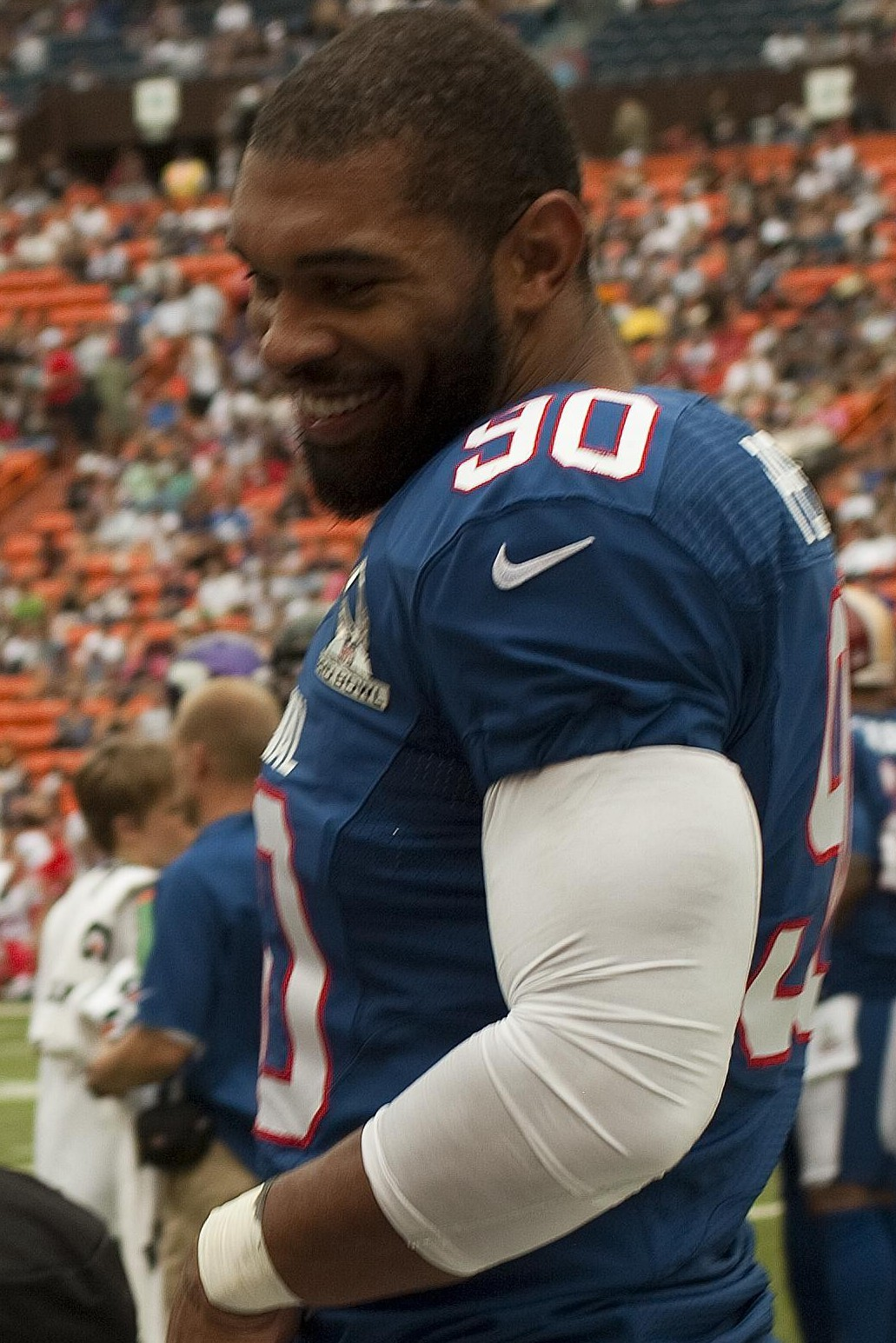
- Peppers at the 2012 Pro Bowl

No. 90, 56
- Positions: Defensive end, linebacker

Personal information
- Born: January 18, 1980 (age 46); Wilson, North Carolina, U.S.
- Listed height: 6 ft 7 in (2.01 m)
- Listed weight: 295 lb (134 kg)

Career information
- High school: Southern Nash (Bailey, North Carolina)
- College: North Carolina (1998–2001)
- NFL draft: 2002: 1st round, 2nd overall pick

Career history
- Carolina Panthers (2002–2009); Chicago Bears (2010–2013); Green Bay Packers (2014–2016); Carolina Panthers (2017–2018)

Awards and highlights
- NFL Defensive Rookie of the Year (2002); 3× First-team All-Pro (2004, 2006, 2010); 3× Second-team All-Pro (2008, 2009, 2012); 9× Pro Bowl (2004–2006, 2008–2012, 2015); NFL 2000s All-Decade Team; NFL 2010s All-Decade Team; PFWA All-Rookie Team (2002); Carolina Panthers Hall of Honor; 100 greatest Bears of All-Time; Chuck Bednarik Award (2001); Lombardi Award (2001); Bill Willis Trophy (2001); Unanimous All-American (2001); Second-team All-American (2000); 2× First-team All-ACC (2000, 2001); North Carolina Tar Heels Jersey No. 49 honored; North Carolina Sports Hall of Fame

Career NFL statistics
- Total tackles: 719
- Sacks: 159.5
- Forced fumbles: 51
- Pass deflections: 82
- Interceptions: 11
- Defensive touchdowns: 6
- Stats at Pro Football Reference
- Pro Football Hall of Fame
- College Football Hall of Fame

Julius Frazier Peppers (born January 18, 1980) is an American former professional football player who was a defensive end and linebacker in the National Football League (NFL). He played college football for the North Carolina Tar Heels, where he was recognized as a unanimous All-American, and was selected by the Carolina Panthers second overall in the 2002 NFL draft, and also played for the Chicago Bears from 2010 through 2013 and the Green Bay Packers from 2014 to 2016. After rejoining the Panthers for the 2017 season, he retired after the 2018 NFL season.

Peppers was named to the Pro Bowl nine times, and both the first and second All-Pro teams three times each. In his rookie season, he was named NFL Defensive Rookie of the Year in 2002, where he recorded 12 sacks, five forced fumbles, and an interception, all while playing in only 12 games. He was named to the 2000s and NFL 2010s All-Decade Teams. In 2024, Peppers was selected for induction into the Pro Football Hall of Fame, becoming the first player drafted by the Carolina Panthers to be inducted. He is the first person to be inducted into both the Pro Football and College Football Hall of Fame in the same year.

== Early life ==
Peppers was born in Wilson, North Carolina, and raised in nearby Bailey. He attended Bailey Elementary School, Southern Nash Middle School, and Southern Nash High School where he played football for Coach Ray Davis. By the time he was a senior at Southern Nash High School, Peppers had grown to 6 ft 5 in (1.96 m) and 225 lb (102 kg). When Peppers arrived at Southern Nash his freshman year, Davis felt that Peppers would be an asset on the gridiron for the Firebirds, despite the fact that Peppers had never played football before. During his high school football career, Peppers played running back and defensive lineman, finished with 3,501 rushing yards and 46 touchdowns, and was one of the highest rated defensive linemen in the state.

Peppers also lettered in basketball and track. In basketball, he was voted all-conference as a power forward for four consecutive years. In track, he helped Southern Nash win the state championship for the first time in the school's history. Peppers contributed as a sprinter and jumper, winning the state championship in the 4×400 meter team relay (3:23.10 minutes) and finishing second as a triple jumper (14.05 meters).

During his senior year of high school in 1997–98, he was named to the Parade magazine high school All-America team in football as an all-purpose talent and was named Male Athlete of the Year by the NCHSAA. In 2005, Peppers was named by the Rocky Mount Telegram newspaper as one of the 50 Greatest Athletes from the Twin County (Nash and Edgecombe) area.

== College career ==
Peppers attended the University of North Carolina at Chapel Hill, where he played defensive end for the Tar Heels from 1998 to 2001. As a true freshman in 1998, he was redshirted. Peppers led the nation with 15 quarterback sacks during his sophomore season in 2000, and earned first-team All-Atlantic Coast Conference (ACC) and second-team All-American honors. Following his junior season in 2001, he was a first-team All-ACC selection and was recognized as a unanimous first-team All-American. He won the Chuck Bednarik Award as the nation's top defensive player and the Lombardi Award as the best collegiate lineman and the Bill Willis Trophy as the nation's best defensive lineman. He finished tenth in Heisman Trophy voting in 2001. In the three seasons at North Carolina, Peppers started 33 of the 34 games in which he played. He is currently ranked second all-time in UNC history with 30.5 sacks. He accumulated 53 stops behind the line of scrimmage, 167 tackles, five interceptions, two fumble recoveries, five forced fumbles, 13 passes deflected, and 42 quarterback pressures (hurries) and returned two interceptions and one fumble recovery for touchdowns.

=== Basketball ===
While at the University of North Carolina, Peppers was a walk-on member of the men's basketball team. He is the only athlete to play in both a Final Four and a Super Bowl. The North Carolina football coach, Carl Torbush, said he could play football and then be a walk-on for Bill Guthridge on the North Carolina men's basketball team. He was a reserve on the 1999–2000 Tar Heels team that made it to the Final Four. Peppers was a reserve on the 2000–2001 men's basketball team. In the NCAA Tournament, Peppers scored 21 points and grabbed 10 rebounds in a loss to Penn State in the second round. After the season, Peppers decided to focus solely on football and did not play basketball in his final season.

== Professional career ==
=== Pre-draft ===
Peppers was a highly regarded prospect coming into the 2002 NFL draft earning comparisons to Hall of Famer Lawrence Taylor for his ability to dominate a football game.

Pre-draft measurables
Height	Weight	Arm length	Hand span	40-yard dash
6 ft 6 1/4 in (1.99 m)	283 lb (128 kg)	34 1/8 in (0.87 m)	10 in (0.25 m)	4.74 s
All values from NFL Scouting Combine

=== Carolina Panthers (first stint) ===
==== 2002 season ====
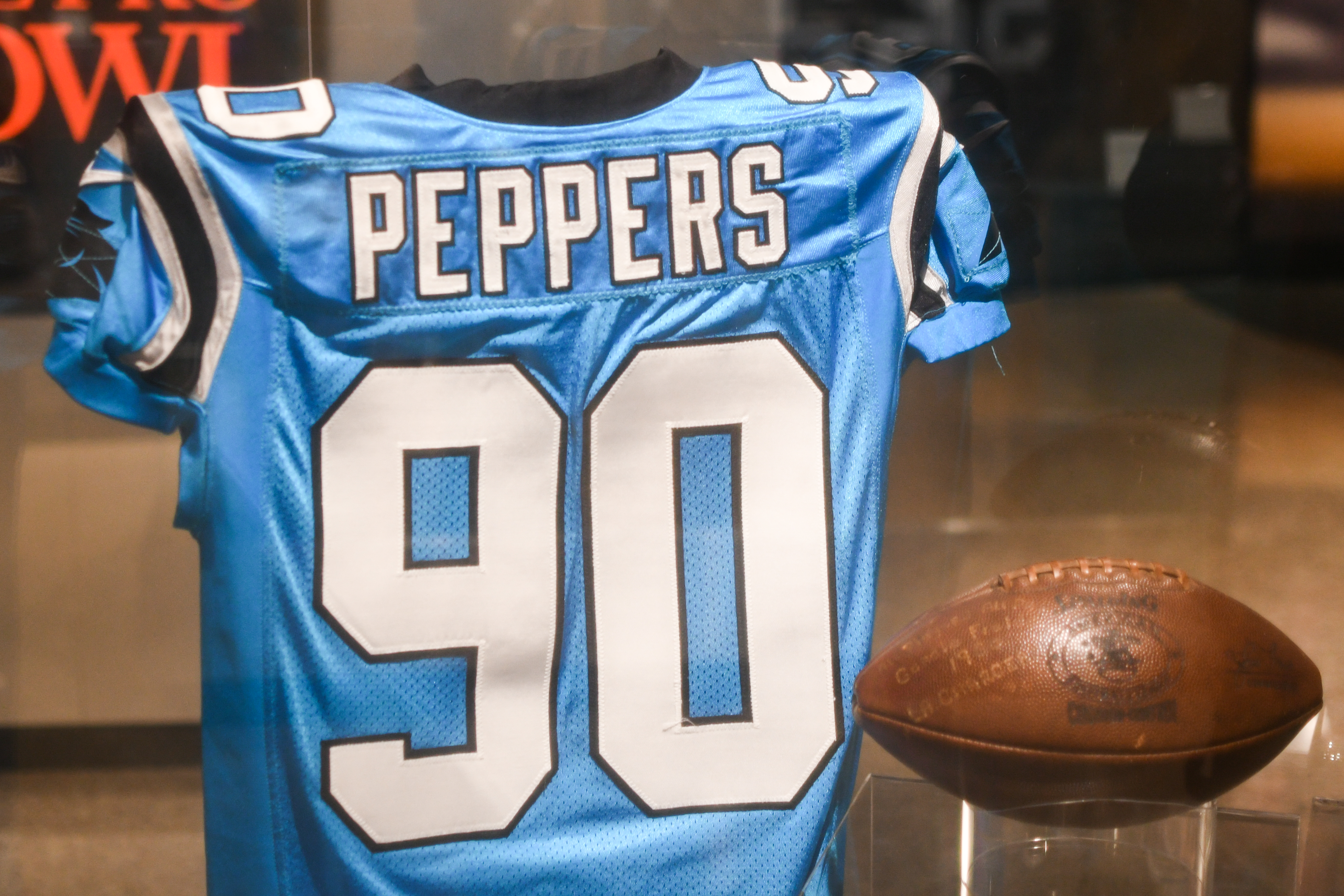
Peppers' #90 Carolina Panthers jersey exhibited at the Pro Football Hall of Fame

Peppers was selected in the first round with the second overall pick in the draft by the Carolina Panthers. On September 8, 2002, against the Baltimore Ravens, Peppers played in his first career NFL game, in which he made an impact by deflecting a pass by Ravens quarterback Chris Redman that was intercepted by linebacker Dan Morgan, who proceeded to race 22 yards down field with under two minutes remaining in the game to preserve the victory; the Panthers won the game by a score of 10–7.

In Peppers' second career NFL game, which came on September 15, against the Detroit Lions, he lived up to his billing with three sacks and a forced fumble for Carolina. Peppers had five tackles including one for a loss, and a deflected pass in the 31–7 victory.

Later that season, in a 14–13 loss against the Dallas Cowboys in week 6, Peppers produced three tackles, three sacks, one forced fumble, one pass defensed, and an interception of Cowboys quarterback Quincy Carter that he returned 21 yards, before lateralling the ball to linebacker Mark Fields, who gained an additional 30 yards. Peppers' second three-sack outing of the year tied the NFL rookie record for three-sack games in a season, set by Leslie O'Neal of the San Diego Chargers in 1986.

As a rookie, Peppers helped the Panthers boast the only defensive unit since the NFL merger in 1970 to improve from last in the league in total defense to second in one season. Peppers finished his rookie season with 29 solo tackles, seven assisted tackles, 12 sacks, five forced fumbles, one interception, and five passes defensed. For his efforts Peppers earned the NFL Rookie of the Month Award in October 2002 and the 2002 Associated Press NFL Defensive Rookie of the Year Award. With four games remaining in the season, Peppers was suspended for violating the NFL's substance abuse policy for taking a banned dietary supplement. Peppers said that he was given a dietary supplement by a friend to help him fight off fatigue. The pills contained an ephedra substance that was banned by the NFL. Peppers said it was an honest mistake on his part and that he would be more cautious in the future.

==== 2003 season ====
In Peppers second season, he was part of a defensive line that included Brentson Buckner, Kris Jenkins, and Mike Rucker. Together, the unit were key players that helped the Panthers reach the Super Bowl. In the 2003 season, Peppers had seven sacks, 46 total tackles (39 solo), three passes defended, and three forced fumbles in 16 games and starts.

In the Wild Card Round against the Dallas Cowboys, Peppers chased down Cowboys receiver Joey Galloway who was one of the fastest players in NFL history, and run him out of bounds after a 28-yard gain. Later in the fourth quarter as the Cowboys were trying to mount a comeback, Peppers intercepted Dallas quarterback Quincy Carter and return it 34 yards to the Cowboys 11 yard line. Peppers recorded one tackle, one interception, and one pass defensed in the game. The Panthers won the game 29–10. In the Divisional Round against the St. Louis Rams, Peppers recorded a sack, two passes defensed, and four tackles, one of which came on a shuffle pass in the second quarter to running back Marshall Faulk. The game went double overtime, as the Panthers defeated the Rams 29–23. The next week in the NFC Championship against the Philadelphia Eagles, Peppers recorded two tackles in helping to lead a dominant defensive performance for the Panthers as they held the Eagles to just three points. The Panthers won by a score of 14–3.

The Panthers reached the Super Bowl for the first time in franchise history and matched up against the New England Patriots. Peppers recorded two tackles in the 32–29 loss. Some online sources claim Peppers and Donovan McNabb are the only two people to ever play in both the NCAA men's basketball Final Four and the NFL's Super Bowl. Unlike Peppers, however, McNabb did not actually play in his college team's Final Four appearance.

==== 2004 season ====
In Week 5 of the 2004 season, Peppers intercepted quarterback Jake Plummer for a 97-yard return, which was an NFL record for a defensive lineman. Peppers recorded four tackles, one interception, and one pass defensed in a losing effort to the Broncos by a score of 17–20.

In a game against the Tampa Bay Buccaneers in Week 12, Peppers produced one of the NFL's most dominant performances of the season by blocking a 26-yard field goal attempt, recording a 46-yard interception return for a touchdown (Which was Peppers first career touchdown scored and was the first interception returned for a touchdown by a defensive lineman in Carolina Panthers history) one pass defended, one sack and four tackles including one stop in which he chased down Buccaneers running back Michael Pittman from behind on a 68-yard screen pass in the second quarter. The Panthers defeated the Buccaneers 21–14.

In Week 15 against the Atlanta Falcons, Peppers caught a fumble in midair by Atlanta Falcons quarterback Michael Vick and raced 60 yards the other way for a Panthers touchdown. Peppers recorded three tackles, one being for a loss of yards, one pass defensed and the 60 yard fumble recovery for a touchdown. The Panthers lost in the end by a score of 34–31.

Peppers set an NFL record by recording 143 total interception return yards which is the most ever recorded in a single season by a defensive lineman. He had a combined 203 interception and fumble return yards which is the most ever by a defensive lineman in a single season since the NFL merger in 1970.

Peppers finished the season with 52 solo tackles, 12 assisted tackles, 11 sacks, four forced fumbles, one fumble recovery, two interceptions, nine passes defensed, four stuffs, one blocked kick, and two defensive touchdowns.

For his accomplishments, Peppers was named to his first NFL Pro Bowl while earning a spot on the NFL's All Pro First-Team. Peppers was named the NFC Defensive Player of the Month in November 2004 and finished fourth overall in the voting by the Associated Press for the AP NFL Defensive Player of the Year Award.

==== 2005 season ====
Peppers broke a bone in his right hand in the sixth game of the season against the Lions, but returned to the game with a cast and help the Panthers get a win 21–20. He played the next few games with a cast on his hand. Peppers recorded two three-sack games during the season, one against the Tampa Bay Buccaneers in Week 9, in which addition to his three sacks, Peppers recorded five tackles.

His other three-sack effort came against the Dallas Cowboys in Week 16, in this game Peppers recorded eight tackles, one pass defensed, and one blocked kick. Despite Peppers' efforts, the Panthers lost 20–24.

For the season, Peppers recorded 38 solo tackles, 12 assisted tackles, 10.5 sacks, two forced fumbles, one fumble recovery, six passes defensed, five stuffs, and one blocked kick. Peppers made his second Pro Bowl for his efforts.

In the Wild Card Round of the playoffs, Peppers was part of defensive effort that held scoreless the New York Giants offense that ranked third in the NFL in points per game. Peppers contributed two tackles, one sack, and one pass defensed to the victory.

In the Divisional Round against the Chicago Bears, Peppers hurt his shoulder while driving Bears running back Thomas Jones out of bounds near the goal line in the fourth quarter. Peppers went to the locker room after the play, and later returned to the bench but not the game. Peppers recorded three tackles and helped the Panthers get the win 29–21.

In the NFC Championship, against the Seattle Seahawks Peppers played with a hurt shoulder, but recorded six tackles, one being for a loss of yards, but the Panthers lost 34–14.

==== 2006 season ====
Peppers again recorded two three-sack games during the 2006 season, his first against the Minnesota Vikings in Week 2, in which he recorded eight tackles, three sacks, one stuff, one pass defensed, and one blocked kick.

In Week 3 against the Cleveland Browns, Peppers recorded five tackles, one being for a loss of yards, a sack, forced fumble, fumble recovery on the same play, five quarterback hits, and a pass defensed. In the game, Peppers made an athletic play when Browns fullback Lawrence Vickers took a handoff right but pulled up to pass the ball. Peppers, playing left end, read the play before it began to develop, sprinted downfield and tipped the ball away from tight end Kellen Winslow II. Peppers dominant play helped the Panthers defeat the Browns 20–12.

In Week 6 against the Baltimore Ravens, Peppers became the Panthers' all-time sacks leader after registering two sacks during the game. Peppers recorded eight tackles and a forced fumble.

In Week 10 against the Tampa Bay Buccaneers, Peppers recorded four tackles, three sacks, one pass defensed, and one fumble recovery in helping to defeat the Buccaneers 24–10. Peppers was so dominant in the game that ESPN Monday Night Football analyst Joe Theismann compared him to Lawrence Taylor, whom Joe had played against while he was a quarterback for the Washington Redskins, and Taylor a linebacker for the New York Giants.

Peppers earned the NFC Defensive Player of the Month Award for the month of October 2006, his second such award. Peppers finished the season with 49 solo tackles, nine assisted tackles, 13 sacks, three forced fumbles, two fumble recoveries, six passes defensed, seven stuffs, and two blocked kicks. His 18 tackles for loss led the NFL. For his efforts, Peppers earned a trip to his third consecutive Pro Bowl and was named NFL First-Team All Pro for the second time in his career.

==== 2007 season ====
Following Panthers safety Mike Minter's retirement after the 2006 season, Peppers was named as the Panthers defensive captain. Peppers had a down season in 2007 after only recording 30 solo tackles, eight assisted tackles, 2.5 sacks, three forced fumbles, two fumble recoveries, one interception, five passes defensed, one stuff, and two blocked kicks. Before the season started, Peppers suffered from an undisclosed illness and lost weight. Peppers missed the final two games of the season with a sprained MCL in his right knee.

==== 2008 season ====
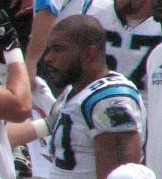
Peppers with the Panthers in 2008

The 2008 season was a bounce back year for Peppers after recording a career-high 14.5 sacks. Peppers changed from left defensive end to right defensive end before the season, which was the position he played in college at the University of North Carolina. His best performance of the season came against the Oakland Raiders in Week 10, a game in which he recorded seven tackles, three sacks, two forced fumbles, and one pass defensed, Peppers moved all along the defensive line and dominated against the Raiders, leading the Panthers to a 17–6 victory. He earned his second NFC Defensive Player of the Week Award after his performance.

Peppers finished the season with 40 solo tackles, 11 assisted tackles, 14.5 sacks, five forced fumbles, five passes defensed, four stuffs, and one blocked kick. After the season, Peppers earned a spot on the NFC Pro Bowl team, which was the fourth of his career. He earned Second-Team All Pro honors. The Panthers made the playoffs after the 2008 NFL regular season but lost in the Divisional Round to the Arizona Cardinals by a score of 33–13. On January 16, 2009, ESPN reported that Peppers told ESPN's Chris Mortensen he did not intend to re-sign a long-term deal with the Panthers and would like to explore options with another team, specifically one with a 3–4 defensive formation. He expressed the desire or willingness to convert from a defensive end to an outside linebacker. Peppers said he would request a trade if franchise tagged. However, despite his request, the Panthers placed the franchise tag on him on February 19.

==== 2009 season ====
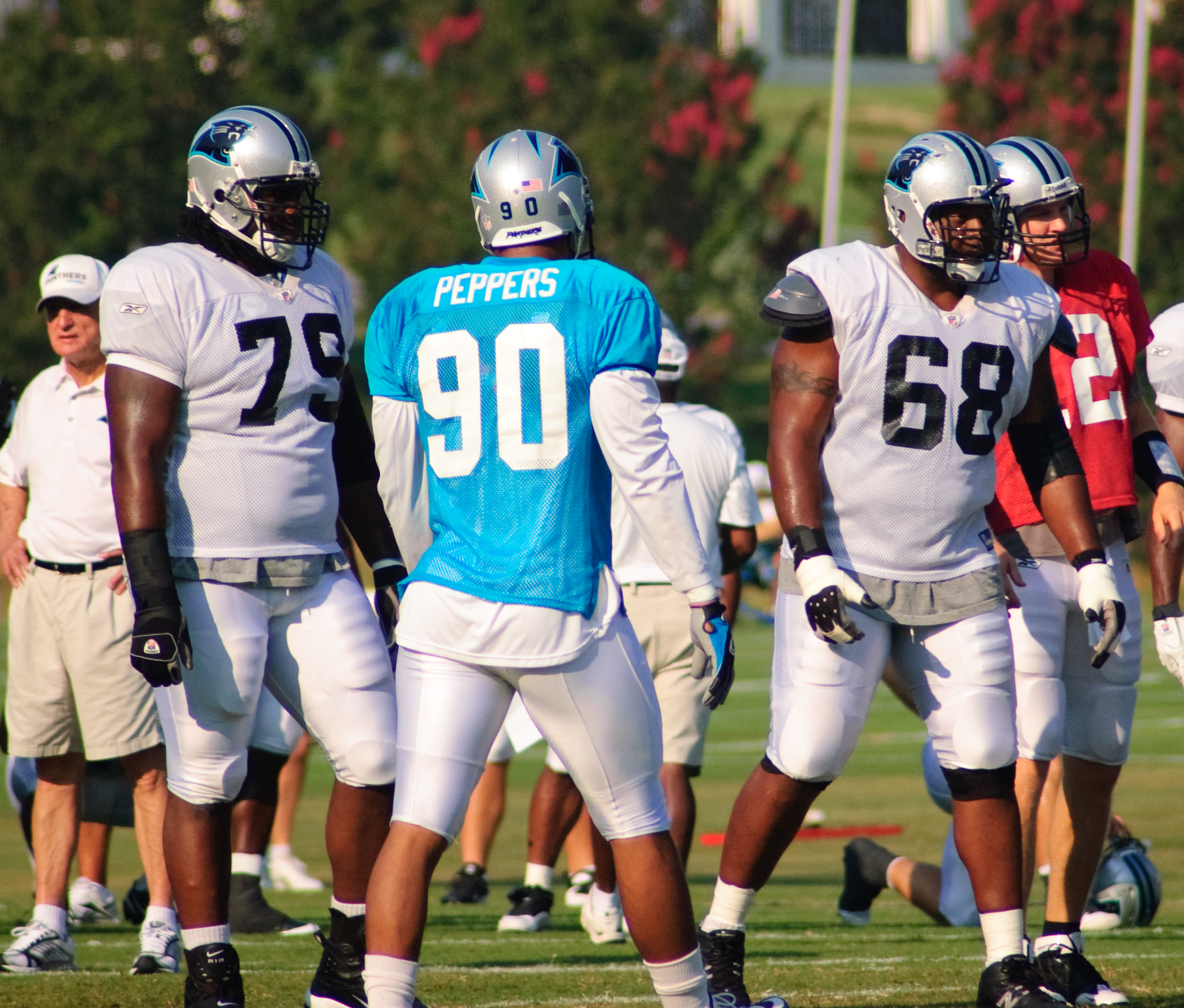
Peppers at Panthers training camp in 2009

The 2009 season ended Peppers' first stint with the Panthers. Peppers began the season well by recording 5 tackles, 1 sack, 1 forced fumble, 1 pass defensed, and 1 blocked kick in a Week 1, 38–10 loss against the Philadelphia Eagles. Peppers went without a sack during the next two games against the Atlanta Falcons and Dallas Cowboys, both losses as the Panthers started the season 0–3, causing Panthers linebacker Jon Beason to question Peppers' intensity on a radio show in Charlotte, North Carolina. Beason would later admit that he was wrong about saying this about Peppers and said he thought that Julius would go down as one of the best players to ever play in the NFL.

Peppers bounced back in Week 5 of the 2009 season against the Washington Redskins by recording five tackles, two sacks, and along with the help of Panthers linebacker Thomas Davis, tackled Washington running back Clinton Portis in the end zone for a safety in the 20–17 victory. In Week 8, in a 34–21 win against the Arizona Cardinals, Peppers recorded two tackles, one sack, one forced fumble, one interception for a 13-yard touchdown, and one pass defensed earning him his third NFC Defensive Player of the Week Award. In Week 9, in a 30–20 loss against the New Orleans Saints, Peppers broke his right hand, but continued to play with a cast on his hand over the next few games.

In Week 15 against the Minnesota Vikings, Peppers played one of his best games of his career. Peppers had five quarterback hurries and was all over the field, causing sports writer Peter King to say that Peppers looked like Lawrence Taylor and Deacon Jones rolled into one dominant force.

Peppers played so well he caused Vikings Pro Bowl left tackle Bryant McKinnie to be benched by Vikings head coach Brad Childress. Peppers' effectiveness not only prompted Childress to switch tackles, but to consider making a quarterback change, which Vikings quarterback Brett Favre strongly resisted. Childress said he wanted to protect Favre, who he said was getting his rear end kicked and was taking a beating. In Week 17, in a 23–10 win against the New Orleans Saints played at Bank of America Stadium in Charlotte, North Carolina, Peppers played in his final game as a member of the Carolina Panthers during his first stint with the team. Peppers recorded three tackles, one interception, and one pass defensed. The interception Peppers recorded was, at the time, thought to be the final play of his Panthers career, but Peppers eventually returned to his home state team before the 2017 NFL season. Julius finished the season with 36 solo tackles, six assisted tackles, 10.5 sacks, five forced fumbles, one fumble recovery, two interceptions, five passes defensed, three stuffs, one blocked kick, and one defensive touchdown.

Peppers was voted to his fifth Pro Bowl and earned Second-Team All Pro honors. On February 22, 2010, Adam Schefter reported that the Panthers would not place the franchise tag on Peppers, leaving him an unrestricted free agent, free to pursue a contract with another team.

=== Chicago Bears ===
==== 2010 season ====
On March 5, 2010, the Chicago Bears signed Peppers to a six-year contract worth $91.5 million, with $42 million guaranteed in the first three years. Peppers made an immediate impact in Week 1 against the Detroit Lions by sacking quarterback Matthew Stafford and forcing a fumble with 29 seconds to go in the first half. The hit Peppers put on Stafford knocked him out for the remainder of the game.

In Week 3 against the Green Bay Packers, Peppers recorded just two tackles, but was a thorn in the side of the Packers offensive line and Quarterback Aaron Rodgers all game long, forcing multiple false start and holding penalties, and hurrying Rodgers in the pocket all game long. Peppers blocked a field goal that ultimately proved to be the difference in the game as the Bears went on to defeat the Packers by three points by a score of 20–17.

In Week 5, Peppers went back to his home state to play against his former team, the Carolina Panthers, a game in which he and the Bears won by a score of 23–6. His biggest play of the game was when he tipped a Jimmy Clausen pass and proceeded to intercept it, by diving underneath the ball, after the play, Peppers proceeded to hush the booing crowd by raising his index finger to his lips. Peppers finished the game with four tackles, one interception, and one pass defensed.

In Week 11 against the Miami Dolphins, Peppers recorded his first three-sack performance as a member of the Chicago Bears, he finished the game with six tackles, three sacks, and one pass deflection that was intercepted. He earned his fourth career NFC Defensive Player of the Week Award. Peppers won the NFC Defensive Player of the Month Award for November 2010 making it the third time in his career he earned the award.

Peppers finished the season with 43 solo tackles, 11 assisted tackles, eight sacks, three forced fumbles, two interceptions, nine passes defensed, five stuffs, and one blocked kick. His impact was most felt with regards to putting pressure on opposing quarterbacks, redirecting running plays, or assisting on the tackle. Julius was voted to his sixth Pro Bowl and was named to his third, First-Team All Pro team. Peppers finished fourth in voting for the NFL's 2010 AP Defensive Player of the Year Award, which was won by Pittsburgh Steelers safety Troy Polamalu.

In Peppers first year as a Bear, he helped them make the playoffs for the first time since the 2006 season, and helped the Bears secure a victory over the Seattle Seahawks in the divisional round by a score of 35–24. Peppers and the Bears came within one game of reaching the Super Bowl, but ultimately lost to the Green Bay Packers in the NFC championship game 21–14.

In his 2010 All-Pro Team column, sportswriter Peter King wrote:

Though Peppers had but eight sacks this year, he had a huge impact on a defense that went from 21st in the league in points allowed in 2009 to fourth this year; from 4.3 yards per rush last year to 3.7 this year; from 29 touchdown passes surrendered last year to 14 this year. He pushes the pocket. He buzzes around the quarterback. He makes other guys – Israel Idonije, Tommie Harris – better.
There's no question the return of Brian Urlacher at the pivot point of the defense has been a significant addition, but Peppers has been the most important reason the Bears have become the Monsters of the Midway again, and that's why he's my defensive player of the year. He's the John Stockton of the Bears defense, the guy who makes everyone around him better."

Peppers was ranked tenth by his fellow players on the NFL Top 100 Players of 2011.

==== 2011 season ====
Peppers improved on his 2010 season in 2011 starting all 16 games and leading the Bears defense with 11 sacks despite facing constant double teams, and playing much of the season with a sprained MCL in his left knee that he injured in Week 5 against the Detroit Lions. Peppers recorded 33 solo tackles, four assisted tackles, 11 sacks, three forced fumbles, two fumble recoveries, four passes defensed, six stuffs, and two blocked kicks. Peppers was awarded his fourth career NFC Defensive player of the month award for November as he collected six tackles, four sacks, and three pass breakups. In Week 17 facing the Vikings, Peppers was awarded a half-sack by the league, that he originally split with fellow Bears defensive lineman Matt Toeaina, giving him his 100th career sack making him the twenty eighth player in NFL history to achieve that milestone. For his efforts Peppers was elected to the Pro Bowl for the seventh time. He was ranked 26th by his fellow players on the NFL Top 100 Players of 2012.

==== 2012 season ====
During the 2012 season, Peppers played with plantar fasciitis, though he was able to record 11.5 sacks on the season, becoming the first Bears player to record ten sacks or more in back-to-back years since Rosevelt Colvin, and the first Bear to record at least 11 sacks in two consecutive seasons since Richard Dent. Peppers recovered a career-high four fumbles, which tied for second in the NFL.

In Week 16, in a 28–13 win against the Arizona Cardinals, Peppers recorded five tackles, three sacks, one stuff, one forced fumble, and one pass defensed making it the ninth time in his career that he had recorded at least three sacks in a game, for his efforts Peppers earned his fifth career NFC Defensive Player of the Week Award. Peppers finished the season with 32 solo tackles, seven assisted tackles, 11.5 sacks, one forced fumble, four fumble recoveries, two passes defensed, three stuffs, and one blocked kick. He was named to the 2013 Pro Bowl, his fifth consecutive, and eighth of his career, and was selected to the NFL's 2012 All-Pro Second Team. Peppers received the Bears Brian Piccolo Award given annually to the player that best exemplifies the courage, loyalty, teamwork, dedication and sense of humor of the late Bears running back Brian Piccolo.

On June 5, 2013 Profootballtalk.com named Julius Peppers to their Carolina Panthers Mount Rushmore as one of the teams most significant players in franchise history. On July 31, 2013 EA Tiburon revealed that Peppers was named to their "Madden NFL All-25 Team." He was ranked 54th by his fellow players on the NFL Top 100 Players of 2013.

==== 2013 season ====
During the Chicago Bears 2013 training camp, Peppers said after one of the Bears practices that he felt 25 years old, and that he wanted to win the first Deacon Jones Award, which was to be given to the player that led the league in sacks. In Week 3 of the 2013 NFL season in a game against the Pittsburgh Steelers, Peppers returned a fumble recovery 42 yards for a Bears touchdown with under four minutes remaining in the game to help seal a Bears victory by a score of 40–23. It was the second fumble recovery Peppers had returned for a touchdown in his career, as well as his fourth touchdown scored. In the Bears Week 11 game against the Baltimore Ravens, Peppers recorded a career-high 11 tackles as well as two sacks and two more tackles for loss in helping the Bears defeat the Ravens in overtime by a score of 23–20. Peppers finished the season with 31 solo tackles, 14 assisted tackles, seven sacks, two forced fumbles, one fumble recovery, one interception, three passes defensed, two stuffs, and one defensive touchdown as the Bears finished 8–8 and missed the postseason.

On March 11, 2014, Peppers was released by the Chicago Bears after attempts to trade him were unsuccessful.

=== Green Bay Packers ===
==== 2014 season ====
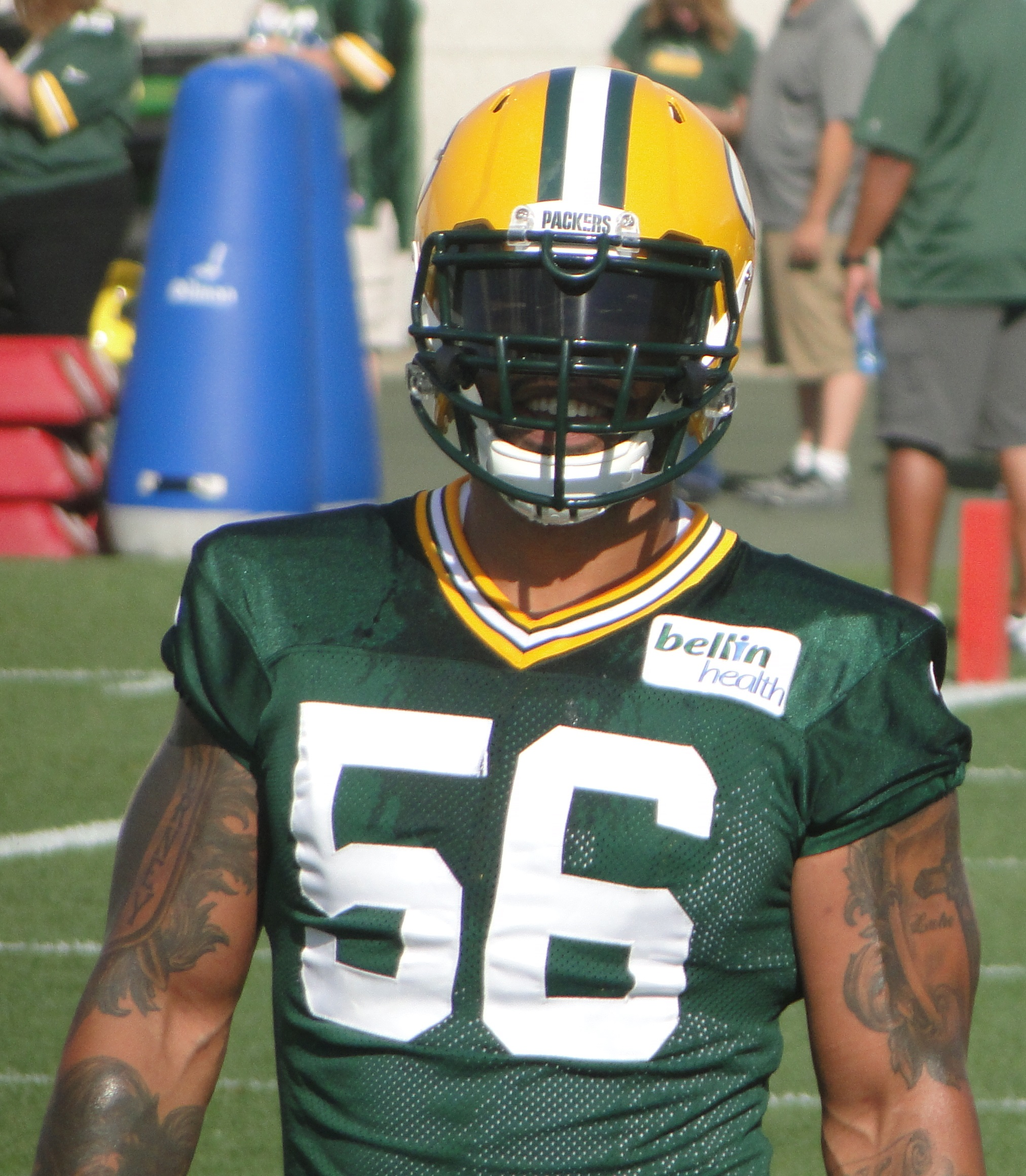
Peppers in 2014 training camp

Peppers signed a three-year deal with the Green Bay Packers on March 15, 2014. The deal was worth $30 million with $8.5 million in first year, and $7.5 million guaranteed.

In Week 3 of the 2014 season, Peppers recorded his first sack as a Green Bay Packer and recorded his 40th career forced fumble and 15th career fumble recovery on the same play. It happened in a losing effort against the Detroit Lions by a score of 19–7. In Week 5, he recorded his tenth career interception and raced across the field and down the sideline 49 yards to score the fifth touchdown of his career. In doing so, Peppers became the first player in NFL history to record at least 100 sacks and 10 interceptions, he recorded three assisted tackles one being for a loss of yards, a pass defensed, and a half-sack in helping the Packers defeat the Minnesota Vikings by a score of 42–10. For his efforts against the Vikings, Peppers was named the NFC defensive player of the week for the sixth time in his career, making him along with Chris Doleman the only two players to win the award with three different teams.

Peppers became the first player since sacks became an official statistic in 1982 to record at least a half-sack and an interception-return touchdown in three different games. Peppers recorded four tackles, two passes defensed, and a sack, forced fumble, and fumble recovery on the same play against Bears quarterback Jay Cutler. The Packers blew out Peppers' former team by a score of 55–14.

In Week 11, Peppers recorded two tackles and his 11th career interception which he returned 52 yards for a touchdown, becoming the first player in NFL history to record at least 100 sacks and four interception-return touchdowns. It was Peppers sixth career touchdown scored including both interceptions and fumble recoveries returned. The Packers defeated the Philadelphia Eagles 53–20.

Peppers finished the season with 29 solo tackles, 15 assisted tackles, seven sacks, four forced fumbles, three fumble recoveries, two interceptions, two defensive touchdowns, and 11 passes defensed.

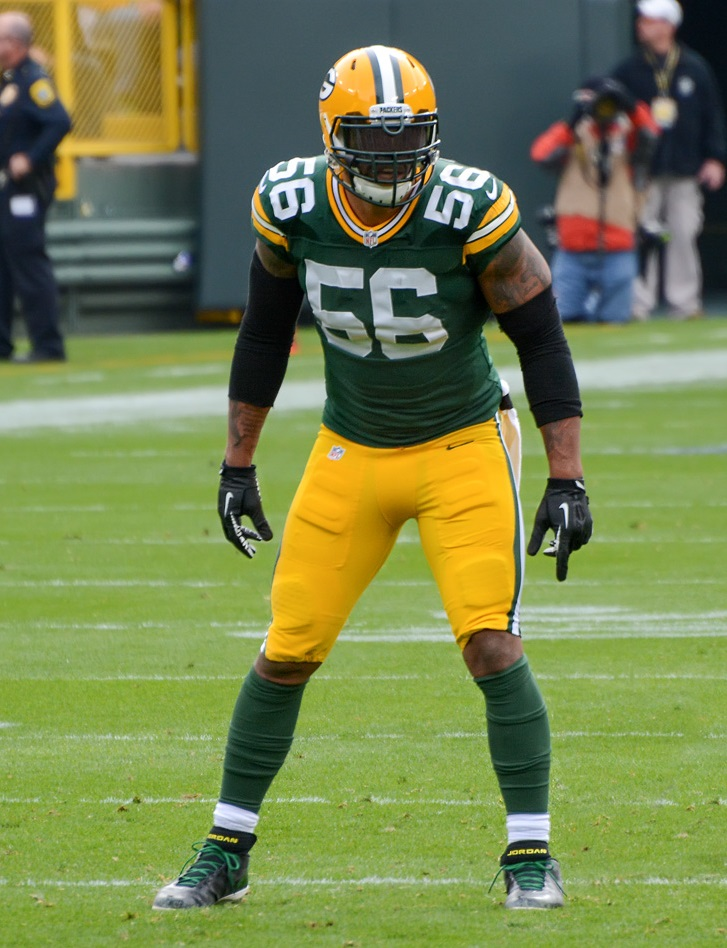
Peppers with the Green Bay Packers in 2014

Peppers ranked first among all linebackers and defensive linemen in the NFL with 101 interception return yards.

In the Divisional Round against the Dallas Cowboys, Peppers had dominant performance by leading the Packers in tackles on the day with six, sacking Dallas quarterback Tony Romo and forcing a fumble on the third play of the game, then drew a holding penalty, and later forced a fumble of running back DeMarco Murray in the third quarter on a play where Murray seemed to have a clear run to the end zone. The Packers went on to defeat the Cowboys 26–21.

The Packers advanced to play the Seattle Seahawks in the NFC Championship. Peppers recorded five tackles, 1.5 sacks, three quarterback hits, and put much pressure on Seahawks quarterback Russell Wilson throughout the game, but ultimately the Packers lost in overtime by a score of 28–22. He was ranked 71st by his fellow players on the NFL Top 100 Players of 2015.

==== 2015 season ====
Peppers started the 2015 season off against the Chicago Bears. He recorded six tackles and 1.5 sacks and passed former Kansas City Chiefs great Derrick Thomas for fifteenth most sacks in NFL history, as well as helping the Packers defeat the Bears by a score of 31–23.

In Week 15 against the Oakland Raiders, Peppers recorded four tackles and 2.5 sacks which moved him past Lawrence Taylor into tenth place on the all-time NFL sacks list, giving him 135 career sacks. The Packers beat the Raiders by a score of 30–20.

Peppers finished the season with 25 solo tackles, 12 assisted tackles, 10.5 sacks, and two forced fumbles. He was selected to his ninth career Pro Bowl.

Peppers helped the Packers reach the playoffs and win their Wild Card Round game against the Washington Redskins by a score of 35–18, he had two tackles in the game. In the Divisional Round against the Arizona Cardinals, Peppers recorded one sack, but the Packers lost in overtime 26–20.

==== 2016 season ====
Before the season started, the top three living NFL sack leaders of all time, Bruce Smith, Kevin Greene, and Chris Doleman all said that Julius Peppers should be a Hall of Famer once he retires.

In Week 13, Peppers sacked quarterback Brock Osweiler, moving into the top five on the NFL's all-time sack list with 142.5, passing Michael Strahan for fifth all-time. Peppers finished the game with five tackles and one sack, helping the Packers defeat the Houston Texans by a score of 21–13. In Week 15 against his former team the Chicago Bears, Peppers recorded four tackles, a sack, a forced fumble, and a fumble recovery on the first play of the second half to help the Packers win by a score of 30–27.

Peppers finished the season with 15 solo tackles, eight assisted tackles, 7.5 sacks, two forced fumbles, one fumble recovery, and three passes defensed.

In the NFC Wild Card Round against the New York Giants, Peppers sacked Giants quarterback Eli Manning in the first half on a third down play to force a Giants punt. Peppers ended another Giants drive on third down when he batted a pass that was nearly intercepted, and another on a later play by hitting Eli Manning just as he released the pass, causing an incompletion. Peppers finished the game with three tackles, one sack, two quarterback hits, and two passes defended helping the Packers beat the Giants by a score of 38–13 and advance to the Divisional Round against the Dallas Cowboys. Peppers helped beat the Cowboys the following week 34–31, but the Packers lost a week later to the Atlanta Falcons in the NFC Championship by a score of 44–21.

=== Carolina Panthers (second stint) ===
==== 2017 season ====
On March 10, 2017, Peppers signed a one-year contract to return to the Panthers. Peppers stated that while he was away from his home state of North Carolina and his home state team, and team that drafted him, the Carolina Panthers, he realized how much he missed the place saying "home is where the heart is." He said he always wanted to return to the Panthers and repair the relationships with the team and fans and give them another chance to see him wear the Panthers uniform once again. Peppers was given the jersey #90, which was the same number he wore for the first eight years of his career while playing for the Carolina Panthers.

In the Panthers' regular season opener, Peppers recorded a half sack and two quarterback hits, helping the Panthers beat the San Francisco 49ers by a score of 23–3 in his first game back with the team. In week 2 and in his homecoming game in Charlotte, North Carolina at Bank of America Stadium, Peppers recorded six tackles and two sacks as the Panthers defeated the Buffalo Bills by a score of 9–3. After the game, Peppers went on to say that this defense is the best he's ever been a part of.

In week 4, Peppers helped the Panthers defeat the New England Patriots by a score of 33–30. Peppers recorded four tackles, two sacks, three quarterback hits as he helped to disrupt Patriots quarterback Tom Brady and the New England offense throughout the game, despite playing through a right shoulder injury of his own that he had in a brace. For his efforts, Peppers was named the NFC Defensive Player of the Week for the seventh time in his career. In Week 5, Peppers recorded a sack and had a big fourth down tackle for a four-yard loss which resulted in a turnover on downs in a game where the Panthers defeated the Detroit Lions by a score of 27–24. In Week 6 against the Philadelphia Eagles, Peppers recorded his 150th career sack, making him the fifth player in NFL history to achieve that milestone. However, the Panthers lost 28–23. In Week 8 win against the Tampa Bay Buccaneers, Peppers recorded his 151st sack, moving him past Chris Doleman for fourth most all-time. The sack gave Peppers 7.5 sacks for the season, tying him with Bruce Smith for the most seasons with at least seven sacks (15). In Week 15 against the Green Bay Packers, Peppers recorded a half sack late in the fourth quarter on a fourth down play against quarterback Aaron Rodgers, helping the Panthers ultimately win 31–24. The half sack gave Peppers ten sacks on the season and ten total seasons with double digit sacks, becoming only the fourth player in NFL history to achieve that milestone. Peppers became only the third player in NFL history at age 37 or older to record at least 10 sacks in a season.

Peppers finished the season with 21 solo tackles, 12 assisted tackles, 11 sacks, two forced fumbles, and two fumble recoveries.

Peppers helped the Panthers make the playoffs, and they faced off against the New Orleans Saints in the Wild Card Round. Peppers recorded two tackles in the game including a tackle for loss on third down with 2:27 remaining in the fourth quarter. The Saints went for it on fourth down and Saints' quarterback Drew Brees threw an interception thereby giving the Panthers offense one more chance to win the game, but the Panthers offense was unable to score, and the Panthers lost 31–26.

==== 2018 season ====
On March 14, 2018, Peppers signed a one-year contract extension with the Panthers.

In week 6 against the Washington Redskins, Peppers recorded a sack and a forced fumble which gave him 50 forced fumbles for his career. Peppers is only the second player in NFL history to record at least 50 forced fumbles, the first being Robert Mathis. The Panthers lost the game though 17–23. In week 7 against the Philadelphia Eagles, Peppers recorded a sack and forced fumble on fourth down late in the fourth quarter to seal the victory for the Panthers by a score of 21–17. In week 17 against the New Orleans Saints, in what was his final NFL game, Peppers recorded four solo tackles, one sack, two tackles for loss, and one pass defensed as he looked to be all over the field in helping to defeat the Saints by a score of 33–14.

Peppers finished the season with 14 solo tackles, eight assisted tackles, five sacks, two forced fumbles, one fumble recovery, and six passes defensed.

After a 17-year career in the NFL, Peppers announced his retirement on February 1, 2019. Peppers finished his legendary NFL career with 716 total tackles and 159.5 sacks (fourth most all-time – trailing only Bruce Smith (200), Reggie White (198) and Kevin Greene (160). He sacked 77 different quarterbacks, tied with Hall of Famer Reggie White for the most since sacks became official in 1982. Peppers recorded at least one sack against 30 of the NFL's 32 franchises. The exceptions were the Bengals (three games against) and the Colts (four games against). He had 51 forced fumbles (second most all-time) 21 fumble recoveries, 11 interceptions, 82 passes defensed, six defensive touchdowns scored (four interceptions returned, and two fumble recoveries), 60 stuffs, and 13 blocked kicks (second most all-time). He played in 266 of a possible 272 games in his career – the sixth most games played by a defensive player in NFL history.

== Post-playing career ==
On May 8, 2019, Peppers was hired as a special assistant of business operations with the Carolina Panthers. He and wide receiver Muhsin Muhammad were inducted into the Panthers' Hall of Honor on October 29, 2023.

On February 8, 2024, Peppers was selected to be inducted into the Pro Football Hall of Fame, in his first year of eligibility.

== NFL career statistics ==
Legend
	Led the league
**Bold**	Career high

=== Regular season ===
Year	Team	Games		Tackles					Fumbles				Interceptions				
Year	Team	GP	GS	Cmb	Solo	Ast	Sck	TFL	FF	FR	Yds	TD	Int	Yds	Lng	TD	PD
2002	CAR	12	12	35	28	7	12.0	11	**5**	0	0	0	1	21	21	0	4
2003	CAR	16	16	44	37	7	7.0	10	3	0	0	0	0	0	0	0	3
2004	CAR	16	16	**64**	**52**	12	11.0	9	4	1	**60**	**1**	**2**	**143**	**97**	1	7
2005	CAR	16	16	50	38	12	10.5	13	2	1	10	0	0	0	0	0	6
2006	CAR	16	16	57	48	9	13.0	**18**	3	2	0	0	0	0	0	0	6
2007	CAR	14	14	38	30	8	2.5	3	3	2	0	0	1	0	0	0	5
2008	CAR	16	16	51	40	11	**14.5**	17	**5**	0	0	0	0	0	0	0	5
2009	CAR	16	14	42	36	6	10.5	10	**5**	1	11	0	**2**	13	13	1	5
2010	CHI	16	16	54	43	11	8.0	11	3	0	0	0	**2**	1	1	0	9
2011	CHI	16	16	37	33	4	11.0	15	3	2	0	0	0	0	0	0	4
2012	CHI	16	16	39	32	7	11.5	13	1	**4**	6	0	0	0	0	0	2
2013	CHI	16	16	45	31	14	7.0	8	2	1	42	**1**	1	14	14	0	3
2014	GB	16	16	44	29	**15**	7.0	5	4	3	2	0	**2**	101	52	**2**	**11**
2015	GB	16	16	37	25	12	10.5	9	2	0	0	0	0	0	0	0	0
2016	GB	16	11	23	15	8	7.5	7	2	1	0	0	0	0	0	0	3
2017	CAR	16	5	33	21	12	11.0	10	2	2	0	0	0	0	0	0	0
2018	CAR	16	8	22	14	8	5.0	6	2	1	0	0	0	0	0	0	6
Career		266	240	715	552	163	159.5	175	51	21	131	2	11	293	97	4	79

=== Postseason ===
Year	Team	Games		Tackles				Fumbles				Interceptions				
Year	Team	GP	GS	Cmb	Solo	Ast	Sck	FF	FR	Yds	TD	Int	Yds	Lng	TD	PD
2003	CAR	4	4	0	0	0	1.0	0	0	0	0	**1**	**34**	**34**	0	0
2005	CAR	3	3	0	0	0	1.0	0	0	0	0	0	0	0	0	0
2008	CAR	1	1	2	0	2	0.0	0	0	0	0	0	0	0	0	0
2010	CHI	2	2	4	4	0	0.0	0	0	0	0	0	0	0	0	0
2014	GB	2	2	**11**	**5**	**6**	**2.5**	**2**	0	0	0	0	0	0	0	0
2015	GB	2	2	3	2	1	1.0	0	0	0	0	0	0	0	0	0
2016	GB	3	3	7	4	3	1.0	0	0	0	0	0	0	0	0	**2**
2017	CAR	1	1	2	1	1	0.0	0	0	0	0	0	0	0	0	0
Career		18	18	29	18	11	6.5	2	0	0	0	1	34	34	0	2

== Career highlights ==
=== Awards and honors ===
NFL

- NFL Defensive Rookie of the Year (2002)
- 3× First-team All-Pro (2004, 2006, 2010)
- 3× Second-team All-Pro (2008, 2009, 2012)
- 9× Pro Bowl (2004–2006, 2008–2012, 2015)
- NFL 2000s All-Decade Team
- NFL 2010s All-Decade Team
- PFWA All-Rookie Team (2002)
- Carolina Panthers Hall of Honor
- 100 greatest Bears of All-Time
- 100 sacks club
- NFL Rookie of the Month (October 2002)
- 7× NFC Defensive Player of the Week
- 5× NFC Defensive Player of the Month (November 2004, October 2006, November 2008, November 2010, November 2011)
- Brian Piccolo Award (2013)
- 5× NFL Top 100 — 10th (2011), 26th (2012), 54th (2013), 71st (2015), 73rd (2018)
- Panthers' Ed Block Courage Award (2018)
- Pro Football Hall of Fame (2024)

College

- Chuck Bednarik Award (2001)
- Lombardi Award (2001)
- Bill Willis Trophy (2001)
- Unanimous All-American (2001)
- Second-team All-American (2000)
- Division I-A sacks leader (2000)
- 2× First-team All-ACC (2000, 2001)
- Sporting News Freshman All-American (1999)
- North Carolina Tar Heels Jersey No. 49 honored

Other

- North Carolina Sports Hall of Fame (2021)

=== Records ===
==== NFL records and milestones ====
- Fourth most sacks in NFL history (since 1982): 159.5
- Tied for third most double digit sack seasons in NFL history: 10
- Tied for fifth most games with at least three sacks: 9
- Tied for fifth most multiple sack games in NFL history: 37
- Second most forced fumbles in NFL history: 51
- Second most interceptions by a defensive lineman in NFL history: 9
- 11 career interceptions including time played as a linebacker
- Most interception return yards by a defensive lineman in NFL history: 192 yds
- 293 career interception return yards including time played as a linebacker
- Most interception return yards in a single season by a defensive lineman in NFL history: 143 yds
- Most interception return yards in a single game by a defensive lineman in NFL history: 97 yds
- Longest interception return by a defensive lineman in NFL history: 97 yds
- Most combined interception and fumble return yards by a defensive lineman in a single season since NFL merger in 1970: 203 yds
- Tied for second most interceptions returned for a touchdown by a defensive lineman in NFL history: 2
- Four career interceptions returned for a touchdown including time played as a linebacker
- Second most passes defensed by a defensive lineman in NFL history: 68
- 82 career passes defensed including time played as a linebacker
- Second most blocked kicks in NFL history: 13
- One of two players (T. J. Watt being the other) in NFL history to record at least 100 sacks and 10 interceptions
- Only player in NFL history with 100-plus sacks and four interceptions returned for touchdowns
- Only player in NFL history to record at least 150 sacks and 10 interceptions
- Peppers has three career games with at least a half-sack and an interception-return touchdown, the most such games in the NFL since the sack became an official statistic in 1982

==== Panthers franchise records ====
- Most career sacks: (97)
- Most career forced fumbles: (34)

== Personal life ==
In February 2009, Peppers donated $500,000 to a scholarship program that supports black students at his alma mater of North Carolina. His donation went to the Light on the Hill Society Scholarship, a tribute to UNC's earliest black graduates which helps alumni and friends support black freshmen who show the potential for academic excellence at UNC and after they graduate.
