= Tarlos Thomas =

American football player (born 1977)

No. 60
- Position: Offensive tackle

Personal information
- Born: August 23, 1977 (age 49); Monticello, Florida, U.S.
- Listed height: 6 ft 5 in (1.96 m)
- Listed weight: 330 lb (150 kg)

Career information
- High school: Jefferson County (Monticello)
- College: Florida State
- NFL draft: 2001: undrafted

Career history
- Philadelphia Eagles (2001)*; Tennessee Titans (2001–2002)*; Houston Texans (2002)
- * Offseason or practice squad member only

Awards and highlights
- BCS national champion (1999); Third-team All-American (2000); First-team All-ACC (1999); Second-team All-ACC (2000)

Tarlos Thomas (born August 23, 1977) is an American former professional football player who was an offensive tackle in the National Football League (NFL). He played college football for the Florida State Seminoles. Undrafted in the 2001 NFL draft after missing most of his senior season due to anterior cruciate and medial collateral ligaments injuries, he spent the 2002 season on the Houston Texans roster.

Pre-draft measurables
Height	Weight	Arm length	Hand span	40-yard dash	10-yard split	20-yard split	20-yard shuttle	Three-cone drill	Vertical jump	Broad jump	Bench press
6 ft 5 3/8 in (1.97 m)	336 lb (152 kg)	33 in (0.84 m)	9 1/2 in (0.24 m)	5.47 s	1.83 s	3.11 s	4.90 s	8.60 s	25.0 in (0.64 m)	7 ft 8 in (2.34 m)	19 reps
All values from NFL Combine
