= Brett Williams (offensive lineman) =

American football player (born 1980)

No. 74
- Position: Offensive tackle

Personal information
- Born: May 2, 1980 (age 46); Kissimmee, Florida, U.S.
- Listed height: 6 ft 5 in (1.96 m)
- Listed weight: 321 lb (146 kg)

Career information
- High school: Osceola (Kissimmee)
- College: Florida State
- NFL draft: 2003: 4th round, 113th overall pick

Career history
- Kansas City Chiefs (2003–2004)

Awards and highlights
- BCS national champion (1999); First-team All-American (2002); Jacobs Blocking Trophy (2001); 2× First-team All-ACC (2001, 2002); 2× Second-team All-ACC (1999, 2000)

Career NFL statistics
- Games played: 5
- Stats at Pro Football Reference

Brett Weston Williams (born May 2, 1980) is an American former professional football player who was an offensive tackle for the Kansas City Chiefs of the National Football League (NFL). He played college football for the Florida State Seminoles.

== Early life ==
His football career developed at Osceola High School in Kissimmee, Florida, where he also excelled in track and field and weightlifting. He graduated in 1998.

== College career ==
Williams joined the Seminoles of Florida State, where he had a highly decorated college career. Starting in two national championships (and being on the team for a third—his redshirt year), the 1999 Florida State team won the national championship, defeating Virginia Tech, his redshirt freshman year. Williams started all four years of his college career.

Williams earned many awards during his career at Florida State. He earned several All-ACC Honors. He was named a Freshman All-American. In 2002, he was selected as a Playboy All-American, and Williams was twice the recipient of the prestigious Jacobs Blocking Trophy award (given to the top offensive lineman in the ACC) in 2001 and 2002. He also earned the Golden Nole Award, honoring the contributions he made on the field, in the classroom, and in the community.

Williams has been named one of Florida State's Top 100 Players.

== Professional career ==
Pre-draft measurables
Height	Weight	Arm length	Hand span	40-yard dash	10-yard split	20-yard split	20-yard shuttle	Three-cone drill	Vertical jump	Broad jump
6 ft 5 in (1.96 m)	321 lb (146 kg)	31 3/4 in (0.81 m)	10 in (0.25 m)	5.28 s	1.85 s	3.08 s	5.01 s	8.57 s	27.5 in (0.70 m)	8 ft 3 in (2.51 m)
All values from NFL Combine

Williams was selected in the fourth round, with the 113th overall pick, of the 2003 NFL draft. He officially signed with the team on July 17, 2003. He did not play in any games in 2003 but played in five games for the Chiefs in 2004. Williams was placed on injured reserve on September 3, 2005 after suffering a knee injury. He was waived by the Chiefs on September 6, 2005.

== Personal life ==
As head coach of the Lighthouse Christian Chargers, Williams led the team to a national homeschool football championship in 2021. In 2022, the team was inducted into the Missouri Sports Hall of Fame.
