= Chris Weinke =

American football player and coach (born 1972)

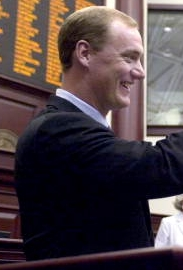
- Weinke in 2001

Current position
- Title: Assistant head coach, co-offensive coordinator, quarterbacks coach
- Team: Georgia Tech
- Conference: ACC

Biographical details
- Born: July 31, 1972 (age 54); Saint Paul, Minnesota, U.S.

Playing career
- 1997–2000: Florida State
- 2001–2006: Carolina Panthers
- 2007: San Francisco 49ers
- Position: Quarterback

Coaching career (HC unless noted)
- 2010: IMG Academy (director)
- 2015–2016: St. Louis Rams (QB)
- 2017–2019: Alabama (off. analyst)
- 2020: Tennessee (QB)
- 2021: Tennessee (RB)
- 2022: Georgia Tech (QB)
- 2023: Georgia Tech (co–OC/QB)
- 2024–present: Georgia Tech (AHC/co-OC/QB)

Accomplishments and honors

Awards
- As a player: PFWA All-Rookie Team (2001); BCS national champion (1999); Heisman Trophy (2000); Florida State Seminoles No. 16 honored; As a coach: CFP national champion (2017)

Christopher Jon Weinke (born July 31, 1972) is an American football coach and former professional quarterback who played in the National Football League (NFL) for seven seasons, primarily with the Carolina Panthers. Initially pursuing a baseball career, he spent seven years in Minor League Baseball (MiLB) before playing college football for the Florida State Seminoles. Weinke won the Heisman Trophy in 2000 and was the oldest player to receive the award at age 28. He was selected by the Panthers in the fourth round of the 2001 NFL draft.

Weinke served as Carolina's primary starter during his first season, but after winning only one game, he spent the remainder of his career as a backup. Following six seasons with the Panthers, he was a member of the San Francisco 49ers in his final year. Weinke pursued a coaching career after retiring as a player and has served as an assistant coach with the Georgia Tech Yellowjackets since 2022.

== Early life ==
Weinke was born and raised in St. Paul, Minnesota, where he attended Cretin-Derham Hall High School and was a three-sport star, playing first base for the baseball team, quarterback for the football team, and was captain of the hockey team. In 1989 during his senior year in high school, he was a Parade magazine and USA Today first-team All-America selection, was named Minnesota's prep football player of the year, and was seen as the top senior quarterback in the country. Weinke was recruited by over seventy Division 1 schools, including Alabama, Arizona, Arizona State, Florida State, Illinois, Minnesota, Miami, Washington, and Wisconsin, but ultimately signed a national letter of intent and committed to play quarterback for the Florida State Seminoles of Florida State University despite being a diehard Miami Hurricanes fan (due to fellow Cretin-Derham Hall alumnus Steve Walsh attending the school and starring for the team at quarterback).

== Professional baseball career ==
Chris Weinke
- First baseman
- Bats: Left Throws: Right
- Stats at Baseball Reference
Medals
Men's baseball
Representing United States
World Junior Baseball Championship
Gold medal – first place	1989 Trois-Rivières	Team

Weinke was an all-state baseball player and was named to the ABCA/Rawlings High School All-America Baseball First Team in 1990. He was drafted in the second round of the 1990 Major League Baseball First-Year Player draft (the 62nd player taken overall) by the Toronto Blue Jays. After spending four days in August 1990 on the FSU campus, Weinke put his college career on hold and instead signed a contract to play professional baseball and reported to the Toronto Blue Jays' Class A affiliate Myrtle Beach Blue Jays. Head football coach Bobby Bowden promised Weinke that he would always have a scholarship offer if he wished to return.

Weinke struggled during his professional baseball career, reaching the Class AA level in Minor League Baseball. However, he led the Class A Florida State League and the Class AA Southern League in RBIs in 1993 and 1994.

== College football career ==
Although he was only one step away from playing in the major leagues, after the 1996 season Weinke decided to give up professional baseball and took a scholarship at Florida State University.

Weinke entered Florida State University in 1997, when he was 25 years old and joined the Florida State Seminoles football team as a quarterback. As a sophomore in 1998, Weinke led the Florida State Seminoles to a 9–1 record and #2 national ranking before a season-ending neck injury by Patrick Kerney in the Virginia game forced him to the sidelines for the rest of the season. During his junior season in 1999, he led the #1-ranked Seminoles to the school's first undefeated national championship, defeating Michael Vick and the Virginia Tech Hokies, 46–29. As a senior in 2000, Weinke led the nation in passing with 4,167 yards and won the Heisman Trophy, awarded to college football's best player, as well as the Davey O'Brien Award and the Johnny Unitas Award. He also led the Seminoles to the Orange Bowl for their third national championship game in as many years, where they lost 13–2 to the Oklahoma Sooners. At the age of 28, Weinke was the oldest player ever to win the Heisman Trophy. He finished his Florida State career with a 32–3 record and held numerous FSU records including most passing yards in a career and most career touchdown passes. In 2001, Weinke became the seventh Seminole (and second quarterback) to have his jersey retired. He also graduated with a degree in Sports Management and was a two-time ACC All-Academic Team selection.

Weinke was originally recruited by Florida State as part of the same recruiting class as Charlie Ward, another quarterback who also won a Heisman Trophy and led the Seminoles to a national championship. They both were members of the 1990 Florida State football team, but Weinke left to pursue baseball before the 1990 season started.

Weinke was the first Heisman Trophy winner to not be named a consensus All-American. The consensus All-American honor for quarterback in 2000 went to the Heisman runner-up that year, Oklahoma's Josh Heupel, now the head football coach at the University of Tennessee.

== Professional football career ==
Pre-draft measurables
Height	Weight
6 ft 4 1/4 in (1.94 m)	226 lb (103 kg)
Values from NFL Combine

=== Carolina Panthers ===
Weinke was selected by the Carolina Panthers in the fourth round (106th overall pick) of the 2001 NFL draft. In 2001, he was the starter when the Panthers finished with a 1–15 record. At the time, the Panthers' fifteen consecutive losses in 2001 was a single season record. Weinke averaged 36 pass attempts per game, more than any rookie in NFL history up to that point. After the season, Weinke became the Panthers backup quarterback. He saw his first action since the 2002 season on October 16, 2005, when starter Jake Delhomme went down with an injury against the Detroit Lions. Weinke threw a touchdown pass to wide receiver Ricky Proehl, giving the Panthers the 21–20 win over the Lions.

He re-signed with Carolina during the 2006 off-season, where he continued to back up Delhomme. On December 10, 2006, in a game against the New York Giants, Weinke made his first start since 2002. The Panthers lost the game, but Weinke threw for 423 yards, topping the previous single-game team record of 373 set by Steve Beuerlein. Weinke started the next two games against the Pittsburgh Steelers and Atlanta Falcons, with the game against Atlanta being his second (and last) win as a starter in the NFL. As a starting quarterback for the Panthers, Weinke's team lost seventeen consecutive games that he started (fourteen in 2001, one in 2002 and two in 2006).

=== San Francisco 49ers ===
The San Francisco 49ers signed Weinke on December 12, 2007, after injuries to quarterbacks Alex Smith, Trent Dilfer and Shaun Hill. He started the final game of the 2007 season in a 20–7 loss to the Cleveland Browns. Weinke was not brought back by the 49ers for the 2008 season.

== Career statistics ==
=== NFL ===
Year	Team	Games			Passing								Rushing			
Year	Team	GP	GS	Record	Cmp	Att	Pct	Yds	Y/A	TD	Int	Rtg	Att	Yds	Avg	TD
2001	CAR	15	15	1–14	293	540	54.3	2,931	5.4	11	19	62.0	37	128	3.5	6
2002	CAR	6	1	0–1	17	38	44.7	180	4.7	0	3	26.2	5	9	1.8	0
2003	CAR	0	0	—	DNP											
2004	CAR	0	0	—	DNP											
2005	CAR	3	0	—	7	13	53.8	64	4.9	1	0	93.1	8	-5	-0.6	0
2006	CAR	3	3	1–2	56	96	58.3	625	6.5	2	4	67.4	4	16	4.0	0
2007	SF	2	1	0–1	13	22	59.1	104	4.7	1	0	86.2	0	0	0.0	0
Career		29	20	2–18	386	709	54.4	3,904	5.5	15	26	62.2	54	148	2.7	6

=== College ===
Legend
	Heisman Trophy
	Won the BCS National Championship Game
	Led NCAA Division I FBS
**Bold**	Career best

College statistics
Year	Team	Games			Passing								Rushing			
Year	Team	GP	GS	Record	Cmp	Att	Pct	Yds	Avg	TD	Int	Rate	Att	Yds	Avg	TD
1997	Florida State	3	0	—	7	13	53.8	82	6.3	2	1	142.2	2	**8**	**4.0**	0
1998	Florida State	10	10	9–1	145	286	50.7	2,487	8.7	19	6	141.5	**47**	-168	-3.6	**1**
1999	Florida State	12	12	**12–0**	232	377	61.5	3,103	8.2	25	**14**	145.1	31	-109	-3.5	0
2000	Florida State	13	13	11–2	**266**	**431**	**61.7**	**4,167**	**9.7**	**33**	11	**163.1**	30	-97	-3.2	**1**
Career		38	35	32–3	650	1,107	58.7	9,839	8.9	79	32	151.1	110	-366	-3.3	2

=== MiLB ===
Year	Team	Lg	Aff	G	PA	AB	R	H	2B	3B	HR	RBI	SB	CS	BB	SO	BA
1991	St. Catharines	NYPL	TOR	75	319	272	31	65	9	1	3	40	12	9	41	61	.239
1992	Myrtle Beach	SALL	TOR	135	543	458	61	110	16	2	13	63	4	9	70	89	.240
1993	Dunedin	FLOR	TOR	128	549	476	68	135	16	2	17	98	8	6	66	78	.284
1994	Knoxville	SOUL	TOR	139	580	526	61	133	23	2	8	87	12	4	45	121	.253
1995	Syracuse	IL	TOR	113	388	341	42	77	12	2	10	41	4	3	44	74	.226
1996	Syracuse	IL	TOR	51	182	161	21	30	8	1	3	18	0	1	19	49	.186
1996	Knoxville	SOUL	TOR	75	321	265	48	70	18	2	15	55	2	2	52	74	.264
Career				716	2,882	2,499	332	620	102	12	69	402	42	34	337	546	.248

== Career highlights ==
=== Awards and honors ===
As a player

- PFWA All-Rookie Team (2001)
- BCS national champion (1999)
- Heisman Trophy (2000)
- Johnny Unitas Golden Arm Award (2000)
- Davey O'Brien Award (2000)
- Sammy Baugh Trophy (2000)
- SN Player of the Year (2000)
- First-team All-American (2000)
- ACC Player of the Year (2000)
- ACC Offensive Player of the Year (2000)
- ACC Brian Piccolo Award (1999)
- First-team All-ACC (2000)
- Second-team All-ACC (1999)
- Florida State Seminoles Jersey No. 16 honored

As a coach

- CFP national champion (2017)
- Phi Mu Florida State Sorority League Pickleball Champion (2018, 2019, 2020)

=== Franchise records ===
- Pass completions, regular season game (36, on December 30, 2001 against the Arizona Cardinals; tied with Teddy Bridgewater)
- Pass attempts, regular season game (63, on December 30, 2001 against the Arizona Cardinals), rookie season (540)
- Interceptions, rookie season (nineteen; with Kerry Collins), rookie game (four, on October 21, 2001 against the Washington Redskins; tied with Kerry Collins x2 and Cam Newton)
- Times sacked, rookie game (eight, on December 2, 2001 against the New Orleans Saints)

== Later life ==
After retirement, Weinke and his family lived in Austin, Texas, where he worked as a vice-president in marketing and event-planning for Triton Financial. In 2010, Weinke teamed with Pro Football Hall of Fame coach John Madden and became the director of the IMG Madden Football Academy in Bradenton, Florida. The academy offers a comprehensive football training program that emphasizes teaching the fundamental techniques of the game. In 2011, Weinke worked with the Carolina Panthers' number one draft pick Cam Newton at IMG up to two hours a day during the NFL lockout.

== Coaching career ==
=== St. Louis Rams ===
The St. Louis Rams hired Weinke as quarterbacks coach on February 19, 2015. The Rams fired head coach Jeff Fisher toward the end of the 2016 season. New head coach Sean McVay did not retain Weinke, instead hiring Greg Olson.

=== Alabama ===
Following his departure from the Rams, Weinke held a succession of college jobs. He spent the 2017 season on the Alabama staff as offensive analyst.

=== Tennessee ===
In 2018, he joined the Tennessee staff as running backs coach under new head coach Jeremy Pruitt, succeeding Robert Gillespie. Amid staff changes following a disappointing 2018 season, Weinke moved over to quarterbacks coach.

Tennessee fired Pruitt in January 2021 after reports of recruiting violations; Weinke was not implicated in the investigation. New head coach Josh Heupel did not retain Weinke as part of his staff.

=== Georgia Tech ===
Georgia Tech hired Weinke to be quarterbacks coach on January 2, 2022, replacing Dave Patenaude. Georgia Tech fired head coach Geoff Collins in the middle of the 2022 season; new head coach Brent Key retained Weinke and promoted him to co-offensive coordinator for the 2023 season. Key promoted Weinke to Assistant Head Coach in advance of the 2024 season.
