= Oklahoma Sooners football statistical leaders =

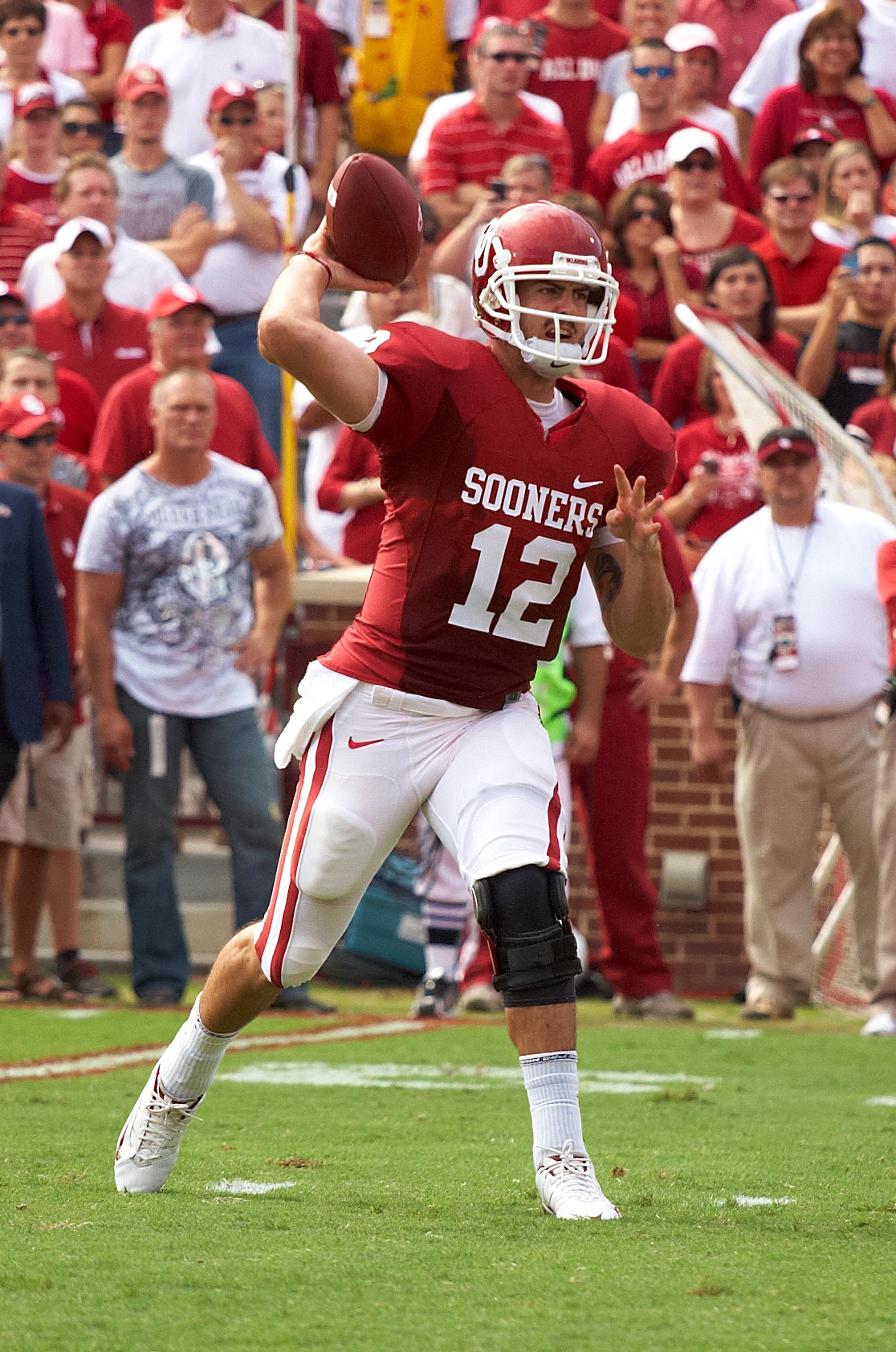
A 4-year starter, Landry Jones holds all Sooner career passing and total offense records, except for touchdowns responsible for.

The Oklahoma Sooners football statistical leaders are individual statistical leaders of the Oklahoma Sooners football program in various categories, including passing, rushing, receiving, total offense, defensive stats, and kicking. Within those areas, the lists identify single-game, single-season, and career leaders. The Sooners represent the University of Oklahoma (OU) in the NCAA Division I FBS Southeastern Conference (SEC).

Although Oklahoma began competing in intercollegiate football in 1895, the school's official record book considers the "modern era" to have begun in 1946. Records from before this year are often incomplete and inconsistent, and they are generally not included in these lists.

These lists are dominated by more recent players for several reasons:

- Since 1946, seasons have increased from 10 games to 11 and then 12 games in length.
- The NCAA didn't allow freshmen to play varsity football until 1972 (with the exception of the World War II years), allowing players to have four-year careers.
- Bowl games only began counting toward single-season and career statistics in 2002. The Sooners have played in a bowl game every year since then, giving players since 2002 an additional game to accumulate statistics. Similarly, the Sooners played in the Big 12 Championship Game 10 times during their tenure in that conference. OU's current home of the SEC also holds a championship game.
- Since 2018, players have been allowed to participate in as many as four games in a redshirt season; previously, playing in even one game "burned" the redshirt. Since 2024, postseason games have not counted against the four-game limit. These changes to redshirt rules have given very recent players several extra games to accumulate statistics.
- Due to COVID-19 issues, the NCAA ruled that the 2020 season would not count against the athletic eligibility of any football player, giving everyone who played in that season the opportunity for five years of eligibility instead of the normal four.
- The Sooners eclipsed 5,000 total offensive yards as a team all but twice (for a total of 16 times) during the tenure of Bob Stoops as head coach from 1999 to 2016, and did so again during the first two seasons of Stoops' successor Lincoln Riley in 2017 and 2018. Oklahoma had only done this eight times before Stoops' arrival. In addition, the 2017 and 2018 seasons marked the 11th and 12th times the Sooners accumulated over 6,000 yards, with the other 10 times occurring during Stoops' tenure as head coach. The team had never accomplished this feat before Stoops took over.

These lists are updated through 2025.

== Passing ==
=== Passing yards ===
Career
Rank	Player	Yards	Years
1	Landry Jones	16,646	2009 2010 2011 2012
2	Baker Mayfield	12,292 (Note: Mayfield began his college career at Texas Tech in 2013, transferring to Oklahoma after that season and sitting out the 2014 season due to NCAA transfer rules.)	2015 2016 2017
3	Sam Bradford	8,403	2007 2008 2009
4	Jason White	7,922	1999 2001 2002 2003 2004
5	Josh Heupel	7,456	1999 2000
6	Dillon Gabriel	6,828	2022 2023
7	Cale Gundy	6,686	1990 1991 1992 1993
8	Nate Hybl	5,091	2000 2001 2002
9	Kyler Murray	4,720 (Note: Murray began his college career at Texas A&M in 2015, transferring to Oklahoma after that season and sitting out the 2016 season due to NCAA transfer rules.)	2017 2018
10	Spencer Rattler	4,595	2019 2020 2021

Single season
Rank	Player	Yards	Year
1	Sam Bradford	4,720	2008
2	Landry Jones	4,718	2010
3	Baker Mayfield	4,627	2017
4	Landry Jones	4,463	2011
5	Kyler Murray	4,361	2018
6	Landry Jones	4,267	2012
7	Baker Mayfield	3,965	2016
8	Jalen Hurts	3,851	2019
9	Josh Heupel	3,850	1999
10	Jason White	3,846	2003

Single game
Rank	Player	Yards	Year	Opponent
1	Baker Mayfield	598	2017	Oklahoma State
2	Landry Jones	554	2012	West Virginia
3	Baker Mayfield	545	2016	Texas Tech
4	Landry Jones	505	2011	Kansas State
5	Landry Jones	500	2012	Oklahoma State
6	Baker Mayfield	487	2015	Tulsa
7	Sam Bradford	468	2008	Kansas
8	Landry Jones	468	2010	Oklahoma State
9	Landry Jones	453	2010	Colorado
10	Dillon Gabriel	449	2022	Texas Tech

=== Passing touchdowns ===
Career
Rank	Player	TDs	Years
1	Landry Jones	123	2009 2010 2011 2012
2	Baker Mayfield	119	2015 2016 2017
3	Sam Bradford	88	2007 2008 2009
4	Jason White	81	1999 2001 2002 2003 2004
5	Dillon Gabriel	55	2022 2023
6	Josh Heupel	53	1999 2000
7	Kyler Murray	45	2017 2018
8	Cale Gundy	40	1990 1991 1992 1993
	Nate Hybl	40	2000 2001 2002
	Spencer Rattler	40	2019 2020 2021

Single season
Rank	Player	TDs	Year
1	Sam Bradford	50	2008
2	Kyler Murray	42	2018
3	Baker Mayfield	41	2017
4	Jason White	40	2003
	Baker Mayfield	40	2016
6	Landry Jones	38	2010
7	Sam Bradford	36	2007
	Baker Mayfield	36	2015
9	Jason White	35	2004
10	Josh Heupel	33	1999

Single game
Rank	Player	TDs	Year	Opponent
1	Baker Mayfield	7	2016	Texas Tech
2	Landry Jones	6	2009	Tulsa
	Landry Jones	6	2012	West Virginia
	Kyler Murray	6	2018	Baylor
	Caleb Williams	6	2021	Texas Tech
	Dillon Gabriel	6	2022	Texas Tech

== Rushing ==
=== Rushing yards ===
Career
Rank	Player	Yards	Years
1	Samaje Perine	4,122	2014 2015 2016
2	Billy Sims	4,118	1975 1976 1977 1978 1979
3	Joe Washington	4,071	1972 1973 1974 1975
4	Adrian Peterson	4,045	2004 2005 2006
5	Steve Owens	4,041	1967 1968 1969
6	Quentin Griffin	3,938	1999 2000 2001 2002
7	DeMarco Murray	3,685	2007 2008 2009 2010
8	De'Mond Parker	3,403	1996 1997 1998
9	Kennedy Brooks	3,320	2018 2019 2021
10	Stanley Wilson	3,198	1979 1980 1981 1982

Single season
Rank	Player	Yards	Year
1	Adrian Peterson	1,925	2004
2	Billy Sims	1,896	1978
3	Quentin Griffin	1,884	2002
4	Greg Pruitt	1,760	1971
5	Samaje Perine	1,713	2014
6	Billy Sims	1,670	1979
7	Steve Owens	1,649	1968
8	Steve Owens	1,523	1969
9	Eric Gray	1,366	2022
10	Samaje Perine	1,349	2015

Single game
Rank	Player	Yards	Year	Opponent
1	Samaje Perine	427	2014	Kansas
2	Greg Pruitt	294	1971	Kansas State
3	De'Mond Parker	291	1997	Texas
4	Billy Sims	282	1979	Missouri
5	Mike Gaddis	274	1989	Oklahoma State
6	Joe Mixon	263	2016	Texas Tech
7	Steve Owens	261	1969	Oklahoma State
8	Earl Johnson	259	1983	Colorado
9	David Overstreet	258	1980	Colorado
10	Adrian Peterson	249	2004	Oklahoma State

=== Rushing touchdowns ===
Career
Rank	Player	TDs	Years
1	Steve Owens	57	1967 1968 1969
2	Billy Sims	53	1975 1976 1977 1978 1979
3	DeMarco Murray	50	2007 2008 2009 2010
4	Samaje Perine	49	2014 2015 2016
5	Quentin Griffin	44	1999 2000 2001 2002
6	Chris Brown	42	2006 2007 2008 2009
7	Adrian Peterson	41	2004 2005 2006
8	Joe Washington	39	1972 1973 1974 1975
9	Greg Pruitt	38	1970 1971 1972
10	Kejuan Jones	36	2002 2003 2004 2005

Single season
Rank	Player	TDs	Year
1	Steve Owens	23	1969
	Billy Sims	23	1979
3	Billy Sims	22	1978
4	Steve Owens	21	1968
	Samaje Perine	21	2014
6	Jack Mildren	20	1971
	Chris Brown	20	2008
	Jalen Hurts	20	2019
9	George Thomas	18	1949
	Greg Pruitt	18	1971
	Steve Davis	18	1973
	J.C. Watts	18	1980

Single game
Rank	Player	TDs	Year	Opponent
1	Quentin Griffin	6	2000	Texas
2	Steve Owens	5	1968	Nebraska
	Jerald Moore	5	1994	Oklahoma State
	DeMarco Murray	5	2007	North Texas
	Samaje Perine	5	2014	Kansas

== Receiving ==
=== Receptions ===
Career
Rank	Player	Rec	Years
1	Ryan Broyles	349	2008 2009 2010 2011
2	Sterling Shepard	233	2012 2013 2014 2015
3	Mark Clayton	221	2001 2002 2003 2004
4	Kenny Stills	204	2010 2011 2012 2013
5	Juaquin Iglesias	202	2005 2006 2007 2008
6	CeeDee Lamb	173	2017 2018 2019
7	Quentin Griffin	169	1999 2000 2001 2002
8	DeMarco Murray	167	2007 2008 2009 2010
9	Trent Smith	164	1999 2000 2001 2002
	Drake Stoops	164	2018 2019 2020 2021 2022 2023

Single season
Rank	Player	Rec	Year
1	Ryan Broyles	131	2010
2	Ryan Broyles	89	2009
3	Sterling Shepard	86	2015
4	Drake Stoops	84	2023
5	Mark Clayton	83	2003
	Ryan Broyles	83	2011
7	Kenny Stills	82	2012
8	Dede Westbrook	80	2016
9	Marquise Brown	75	2018
10	Juaquin Iglesias	74	2008

Single game
Rank	Player	Rec	Year	Opponent
1	Ryan Broyles	15	2010	Iowa State
	Jalen Saunders	15	2012	Notre Dame
	Justin Brown	15	2012	Oklahoma State
	Sterling Shepard	15	2014	Kansas State
5	Ryan Broyles	14	2011	Tulsa
	Ryan Broyles	14	2011	Kansas State
	Sterling Shepard	14	2015	Baylor
8	Ryan Broyles	13	2009	Stanford (Sun Bowl)
	Ryan Broyles	13	2011	Connecticut (Fiesta Bowl
	Ryan Broyles	13	2011	Missouri
	Ryan Broyles	13	2011	Kansas

=== Receiving yards ===
Career
Rank	Player	Yards	Years
1	Ryan Broyles	4,586	2008 2009 2010 2011
2	Sterling Shepard	3,482	2012 2013 2014 2015
3	CeeDee Lamb	3,292	2017 2018 2019
4	Mark Clayton	3,241	2001 2002 2003 2004
5	Juaquin Iglesias	2,861	2005 2006 2007 2008
6	Kenny Stills	2,594	2010 2011 2012
7	Marquise Brown	2,413	2017 2018
8	Marvin Mims Jr.	2,398	2020 2021 2022
9	Malcolm Kelly	2,285	2005 2006 2007
10	Dede Westbrook	2,267	2015 2016

Single season
Rank	Player	Yards	Year
1	Ryan Broyles	1,622	2010
2	Dede Westbrook	1,524	2016
3	Mark Clayton	1,425	2003
4	CeeDee Lamb	1,327	2019
5	Marquise Brown	1,318	2018
6	Sterling Shepard	1,288	2015
7	CeeDee Lamb	1,158	2018
8	Ryan Broyles	1,157	2011
9	Juaquin Iglesias	1,150	2008
10	Ryan Broyles	1,120	2009

Single game
Rank	Player	Yards	Year	Opponent
1	Marquise Brown	265	2017	Oklahoma State
2	Marquise Brown	243	2018	West Virginia
3	Dede Westbrook	232	2016	Texas
4	Ryan Broyles	217	2011	Kansas
5	Sterling Shepard	215	2014	TCU
6	Ryan Broyles	208	2010	Colorado
7	Manuel Johnson	206	2008	TCU
8	Dede Westbrook	203	2016	Texas Tech
9	Sterling Shepard	197	2014	Kansas State
10	Juaquin Iglesias	191	2008	Kansas

=== Receiving touchdowns ===
Career
Rank	Player	TDs	Years
1	Ryan Broyles	45	2008 2009 2010 2011
2	CeeDee Lamb	32	2017 2018 2019
3	Mark Clayton	31	2001 2002 2003 2004
4	Jermaine Gresham	26	2006 2007 2008
	Sterling Shepard	26	2012 2013 2014 2015
6	Kenny Stills	24	2010 2011 2012
7	Mark Andrews	22	2015 2016 2017
8	Malcolm Kelly	21	2005 2006 2007
	Dede Westbrook	21	2015 2016
10	Marvin Mims Jr.	20	2020 2021 2022

Single season
Rank	Player	TDs	Year
1	Dede Westbrook	17	2016
2	Mark Clayton	15	2003
	Ryan Broyles	15	2009
4	Jermaine Gresham	14	2008
	Ryan Broyles	14	2010
	CeeDee Lamb	14	2019
7	Travis Wilson	11	2004
	Jermaine Gresham	11	2007
	Kenny Stills	11	2012
	Sterling Shepard	11	2015
	CeeDee Lamb	11	2018

Single game
Rank	Player	TDs	Year	Opponent
1	Trent Smith	4	2001	Kansas
	Jermaine Gresham	4	2007	Texas A&M
	Kenny Stills	4	2012	West Virginia

== Total offense ==
Total offense is the sum of passing and rushing statistics. It does not include receiving or returns.

=== Total offense yards ===
Career
Rank	Player	Yards	Years
1	Landry Jones	16,271	2009 2010 2011 2012
2	Baker Mayfield	13,185	2015 2016 2017
3	Sam Bradford	8,439	2007 2008 2009
4	Jason White	7,877	1999 2001 2002 2003 2004
5	Josh Heupel	7,522	1999 2000
6	Dillon Gabriel	7,516	2022 2023
7	Cale Gundy	6,909	1990 1991 1992 1993
8	Kyler Murray	5,863	2017 2018
9	Jamelle Holieway	5,143	1985 1986 1987 1988
10	Jack Mildren	5,117	1969 1970 1971

Single season
Rank	Player	Yards	Year
1	Kyler Murray	5,362	2018
2	Baker Mayfield	4,938	2017
3	Sam Bradford	4,767	2008
4	Landry Jones	4,590	2010
5	Landry Jones	4,439	2011
6	Jalen Hurts	4,340	2019
7	Landry Jones	4,157	2012
8	Baker Mayfield	4,142	2016
9	Baker Mayfield	4,105	2015
10	Dillon Gabriel	4,033	2023

Single game
Rank	Player	Yards	Year	Opponent
1	Baker Mayfield	589	2017	Oklahoma State
2	Baker Mayfield	572	2015	Tulsa
3	Baker Mayfield	564	2016	Texas Tech
4	Landry Jones	554	2012	West Virginia
5	Jalen Hurts	508	2019	Houston
6	Landry Jones	505	2011	Kansas State
7	Landry Jones	494	2012	Oklahoma State
8	Jalen Hurts	491	2019	Kansas State
9	Jalen Hurts	485	2019	Texas Tech
10	Sam Bradford	482	2008	Kansas

=== Touchdowns responsible for ===
"Touchdowns responsible for" is the NCAA's official term for combined passing and rushing touchdowns.

Career
Rank	Player	TDs	Years
1	Baker Mayfield	137	2015 2016 2017
2	Landry Jones	126	2009 2010 2011 2012
3	Sam Bradford	93	2007 2008 2009
4	Jason White	83	1999 2001 2002 2003 2004
5	Dillon Gabriel	73	2022 2023
6	Josh Heupel	65	1999 2000
7	Steve Owens	59	1967 1968 1969
8	Kyler Murray	57	2017 2018
9	Jack Mildren	56	1969 1970 1971
	Cale Gundy	56	1990 1991 1992 1993

Single season
Rank	Player	TDs	Year
1	Sam Bradford	55	2008
2	Kyler Murray	54	2018
3	Baker Mayfield	48	2017
4	Jalen Hurts	47	2019
5	Baker Mayfield	46	2016
6	Baker Mayfield	43	2015
7	Dillon Gabriel	42	2023
8	Jason White	41	2003
9	Landry Jones	39	2010
10	Josh Heupel	38	1999

Single game
Rank	Player	TDs	Year	Opponent
1	Dillon Gabriel	8	2023	West Virginia
2	Baker Mayfield	7	2016	Texas Tech
	Kyler Murray	7	2018	Baylor
4	Josh Heupel	6	1999	Louisville
	Josh Heupel	6	1999	Texas A&M
	Quentin Griffin	6	2000	Texas
	Landry Jones	6	2009	Tulsa
	Landry Jones	6	2012	West Virginia
	Trevor Knight	6	2014	Iowa State
	Baker Mayfield	6	2015	Tulsa
	Baker Mayfield	6	2017	Oklahoma State
	Jalen Hurts	6	2019	Houston
	Caleb Williams	6	2021	Texas Tech

== Defense ==
=== Interceptions ===
Career
Rank	Player	Ints	Years
1	Darrell Royal	18	1946 1947 1948 1949
2	Rickey Dixon	17	1984 1985 1986 1987
3	Sonny Brown	16	1983 1984 1985 1986
4	Zac Henderson	15	1974 1975 1976 1977
	Darrol Ray	15	1976 1977 1978 1979
	Zack Sanchez	15	2013 2014 2015
7	Randy Hughes	14	1972 1973 1974
	Derrick Strait	14	2000 2001 2002 2003
9	Ed Lisak	13	1948 1949 1950
	Steve Barrett	13	1966 1967 1968
	Jason Belser	13	1988 1989 1990 1991
	Darrius Johnson	13	1992 1993 1994 1995

Single season
Rank	Player	Ints	Year
1	Rickey Dixon	9	1987
2	Darrol Ray	8	1978
	Scott Case	8	1983
	J.T. Thatcher	8	2000
5	Huwell Hamm	7	1942
	Darrell Royal	7	1946
	Darrell Royal	7	1947
	Steve Barrett	7	1967
	Dan Ruster	7	1972
	Zac Henderson	7	1977
	Sonny Brown	7	1985
	Brodney Pool	7	2003
	Zack Sanchez	7	2015

Single game
Rank	Player	Ints	Year	Opponent
1	Jack Jacobs	3	1941	Marquette
	Darrell Royal	3	1947	Oklahoma State
	Jerry Tubbs	3	1955	Texas
	Steve Barrett	3	1967	Nebraska
	Randy Hughes	3	1974	Nebraska
	Bud Hebert	3	1979	Florida State (Orange Bowl)
	Darnell Walker	3	1992	Colorado
	J.T. Thatcher	3	2000	Kansas
	Tony Jefferson	3	2011	Ball State

=== Tackles ===
Career
Rank	Player	Tackles	Years
1	Daryl Hunt	530	1975 1976 1977 1978
2	Jackie Shipp	489	1980 1981 1982 1983
3	Travis Lewis	446	2008 2009 2010 2011
4	George Cumby	437	1975 1976 1978 1979
5	Rocky Calmus	431	1998 1999 2000 2001
6	Rod Shoate	426	1972 1973 1974
7	Brian Bosworth	413	1984 1985 1986
8	Tyrell Peters	380	1993 1994 1995 1996
9	Danny Stutsman	376	2021 2022 2023 2024
10	Rick Bryan	365	1980 1981 1982 1983

Single season
Rank	Player	Tackles	Year
1	Jackie Shipp	189	1981
2	Daryl Hunt	177	1976
3	Steve Aycock	175	1970
4	George Cumby	160	1979
5	Daryl Hunt	159	1977
6	Daryl Hunt	157	1978
	Curtis Lofton	157	2007
8	Rod Shoate	155	1974
	Kenneth Murray	155	2018
10	George Cumby	154	1977

Single game
Rank	Player	Tackles	Year	Opponent
1	Kenneth Murray	28	2018	Army
2	Jackie Shipp	23	1981	Missouri
	Curtis Bolton	23	2018	Army
4	Brian Bosworth	22	1986	Miami
	Rocky Calmus	22	1999	Colorado
6	Rod Shoate	21	1974	Texas
	Daryl Hunt	21	1977	Missouri
	Kevin Murphy	21	1983	Missouri
9	Daryl Hunt	20	1976	Iowa State
	Rodney Rideau	20	1999	Notre Dame

=== Sacks ===
Career
Rank	Player	Sacks	Years
1	Cedric Jones	31.5	1992 1993 1994 1995
2	Jeremy Beal	29.0	2007 2008 2009 2010
3	Dan Cody	25.0	2000 2001 2002 2003 2004
4	Scott Evans	24.0	1987 1988 1989 1990
5	Troy Johnson	23.0	1984 1985 1986 1987
6	Eric Striker	22.5	2012 2013 2014 2015
7	Jonathan Jackson	21.0	2001 2002 2003 2004
8	Aubrey Beavers	20.5	1990 1991 1992 1993
	Frank Alexander	20.5	2008 2009 2010 2011
10	Darrell Reed	20.0	1984 1985 1986 1987

Single season
Rank	Player	Sacks	Year
1	Cedric Jones	14.0	1994
	Martin Chase	14.0	1997
3	Aubrey Beavers	11.5	1992
4	Cedric Jones	11.0	1995
	Jeremy Beal	11.0	2009
6	Tony Casillas	10.0	1984
	Troy Johnson	10.0	1986
	Dan Cody	10.0	2003
	Dan Cody	10.0	2004
	Calvin Thibodeaux	10.0	2005

Single game
Rank	Player	Sacks	Year	Opponent
1	Cedric Jones	5.0	1994	Texas Tech

== Kicking ==
=== Field goals made ===
Career
Rank	Player	FGs	Years
1	Michael Hunnicutt	75	2011 2012 2013 2014
2	Austin Seibert	63	2015 2016 2017 2018
3	Gabe Brkic	57	2018 2019 2020 2021
4	Tim Lashar	48	1983 1984 1985 1986
	Tim Duncan	48	1999 2000 2001
6	Garrett Hartley	47	2004 2005 2006 2007
7	R.D. Lashar	44	1987 1988 1989 1990
8	Trey DiCarlo	43	2002 2003 2004
9	Jimmy Stevens	42	2008 2009 2010 2011
10	Scott Blanton	41	1991 1992 1993 1994

Single season
Rank	Player	FGs	Year
1	Michael Hunnicutt	24	2013
	Tate Sandell	24	2025
3	Tim Duncan	21	2001
	Michael Hunnicutt	21	2011
5	Gabe Brkic	20	2020
	Gabe Brkic	20	2021
7	Tim Lashar	19	1985
	Trey DiCarlo	19	2003
	Garrett Hartley	19	2006
	Jimmy Stevens	19	2010

Single game
Rank	Player	FGs	Year	Opponent
1	Jeremy Alexander	4	1995	Iowa State
	Garrett Hartley	4	2006	Oregon
	Jimmy Stevens	4	2009	Baylor
	Jimmy Stevens	4	2010	Oklahoma State
	Michael Hunnicutt	4	2011	Kansas
	Gabe Brkic	4	2020	TCU
	Gabe Brkic	4	2021	Tulane
	Gabe Brkic	4	2021	Texas
	Tate Sandell	4	2025	Tennessee

=== Field goal percentage ===
Career
Rank	Player	FG%	Years
1	Tate Sandell	88.9%	2025
2	Michael Hunnicutt	83.3%	2011 2012 2013 2014
3	Gabe Brkic	82.6%	2018 2019 2020 2021
4	Garrett Hartley	81.0%	2004 2005 2006 2007
5	Jimmy Stevens	80.8%	2008 2009 2010 2011
6	Austin Seibert	79.7%	2015 2016 2017 2018
7	Zach Schmit	72.5%	2021 2022 2023 2024
8	Trey DiCarlo	71.7%	2002 2003 2004
9	R.D. Lashar	69.8%	1987 1988 1989 1990
10	Tim Lashar	68.6%	1983 1984 1985 1986

Single season
Rank	Player	FG%	Year
1	Gabe Brkic	100.0%	2019
2	Garrett Hartley	95.0%	2006
3	Austin Seibert	89.5%	2018
4	Scott Blanton	88.9%	1992
	Michael Hunnicutt	88.9%	2013
	Tate Sandell	88.9%	2025
7	Michael Hunnicutt	87.5%	2011
8	Garrett Hartley	86.7%	2007
9	Trey DiCarlo	86.4%	2003
10	Jimmy Stevens	84.6%	2009
