= 2016 Texas Tech Red Raiders football team =

American college football season

2016 Texas Tech Red Raiders football
- Conference: Big 12 Conference
- Record: 5–7 (3–6 Big 12)
- Head coach: Kliff Kingsbury (4th season)
- Offensive coordinator: Eric Morris (4th season)
- Offensive scheme: Air raid
- Defensive coordinator: David Gibbs (2nd season)
- Base defense: Multiple
- Home stadium: Jones AT&T Stadium

2016 Big 12 Conference football standings
	Conf.			Overall
Team	W		L	W		L
No. 5 Oklahoma $	9	–	0	11	–	2
No. 11 Oklahoma State	7	–	2	10	–	3
No. 18 West Virginia	7	–	2	10	–	3
Kansas State	6	–	3	9	–	4
TCU	4	–	5	6	–	7
Baylor	3	–	6	7	–	6
Texas	3	–	6	5	–	7
Texas Tech	3	–	6	5	–	7
Iowa State	2	–	7	3	–	9
Kansas	1	–	8	2	–	10
$ – Conference champion; Rankings from AP Poll

The 2016 Texas Tech Red Raiders football team represented Texas Tech University in the 2016 NCAA Division I FBS football season as members of the Big 12 Conference. Kliff Kingsbury led the Red Raiders in his fourth season as the program's fifteenth head coach. The Red Raiders played their home games on the university's campus in Lubbock, Texas at Jones AT&T Stadium. They finished the season 5–7, 3–6 in Big 12 play.

== Schedule ==
Texas Tech announced their 2016 football schedule on November 24, 2015. The 2016 schedule consisted of 6 home games, 5 away games and, 1 neutral site game in the regular season. The Red Raiders hosted Big 12 foes Kansas, West Virginia, Oklahoma, and Texas and traveled to Kansas State, TCU, Oklahoma State, and Iowa State. Texas Tech played Baylor in Arlington, Texas at AT&T Stadium for the 75th meeting in their rivalry.

The Red Raiders hosted two non-conference games against Stephen F. Austin and Louisiana Tech and traveled to their other non-conference foe Arizona State in Tempe, AZ.

Date	Time	Opponent	Site	TV	Result	Attendance
September 3	7:00 pm	Stephen F. Austin*	Jones AT&T Stadium; Lubbock, TX	FSN	W 69–17	60,097
September 10	9:00 pm	at Arizona State*	Sun Devil Stadium; Tempe, AZ	FS1	L 55–68	44,511
September 17	6:00 pm	Louisiana Tech*	Jones AT&T Stadium; Lubbock, TX	FSN	W 59–45	57,515
September 29	7:30 pm	Kansas	Jones AT&T Stadium; Lubbock, TX	FS1	W 55–19	56,494
October 8	6:00 pm	at Kansas State	Bill Snyder Family Stadium; Manhattan, KS	ESPNU	L 38–44	51,540
October 15	11:00 am	No. 20 West Virginia^{†}	Jones AT&T Stadium; Lubbock, TX	FS1	L 17–48	54,111
October 22	7:00 pm	No. 16 Oklahoma	Jones AT&T Stadium; Lubbock, TX	FOX	L 59–66	60,478
October 29	2:30 pm	at TCU	Amon G. Carter Stadium; Fort Worth, TX (rivalry)	ESPN2	W 27–24 ^{2OT}	45,619
November 5	11:00 am	Texas	Jones AT&T Stadium; Lubbock, TX (rivalry)	FS1	L 37–45	60,803
November 12	2:30 pm	at No. 17 Oklahoma State	Boone Pickens Stadium; Stillwater, OK	FS1	L 44–45	54,288
November 19	2:30 pm	at Iowa State	Jack Trice Stadium; Ames, IA	FS1	L 10–66	50,787
November 25	5:00 pm	vs. Baylor	AT&T Stadium; Arlington, TX (rivalry)	ESPN	W 54–35	41,656
*Non-conference game; ^{†}Homecoming; Rankings from AP Poll released prior to game; All times are in Central time

Schedule source:

== Roster ==
2016 Texas Tech Red Raiders football team roster
Players
Coaches
Offense

Pos.	#	Name	Class
OL	70	Zach Adams	Fr
OT	58	Madison Akamnonu	Fr
WR	19	Zach Austin	So
WR	13	Cameron Batson	Jr
WR	17	De'Quan Bowman	Jr
OT	65	Baylen Brown (C)	Sr
WR	8	Tony Brown	So
OL	79	Travis Bruffy	Fr
WR	14	Dylan Cantrell	Jr
OL	68	Grant Caravelli	Fr
WR	80	Michael Coley	So
G	74	Cole Collier	So
WR	82	Keke Coutee	So
RB	21	Corey Dauphine	Fr
WR	2	Reginald Davis	Sr
QB	7	Jett Duffey	Fr
OL	77	Connor Dyer	Fr
RB	27	DeMarcus Felton	So
QB	18	Cole Garrett	Fr
WR	9	Jonathan Giles	So
OL	56	Luke Heitshusen	So
WR	21	RJ Hester	Jr
WR	88	Ja'Deion High	Jr
WR	47	Braden Hucks	Fr
FB	33	Stanton Keane	So
WR	87	Kash Knutson	Fr
WR	6	Devin Lauderdale	Sr
QB	5	Patrick Mahomes (C)	Jr
C	51	Tony Morales	Sr
G	73	Justin Murphy	So
OL	75	Giovanni Pancotti	Fr
FB	29	Mason Reed	So
G	72	Jack Reichel	So
WR	34	Hunter Rittimann	So
WR	12	Ian Sadler	Jr
FB, LS	35	Tyler Scalzi	Sr
QB	16	Nic Shimonek	Jr
WR	1	Quan Shorts	Fr
OL	71	Bailey Smith	Fr
OT	64	Ethan Smith	So
G	76	Paul Stawarz	So
OT	78	Terence Steele	Fr
RB	4	Justin Stockton	Jr
QB	10	Payne Sullins	So
WR	15	Donta Thompson	Fr
WR	86	T. J. Vasher	Fr
RB	25	Da'Leon Ward	Fr
WR	22	Antoine Wesley	Fr
C	69	Cody Wheeler	Fr
RB	23	Quinton White	Sr
WR	11	Derrick Willies	Jr
RB	30	Caleb Woodward	So

Defense

Pos.	#	Name	Class
DB	38	Kisean Allen	So
CB	28	Paul Banks	Sr
DE	12	Zach Barnes	Jr
ILB	20	Jordyn Brooks	Fr
DB	25	Douglas Coleman	Fr
DL	51	John Crow	Fr
DT	4	Breiden Fehoko	So
DB	23	DeMarcus Fields	Fr
DL	94	Lonzell Gilmore	Fr
DL	50	Clarence Henderson	Fr
S	24	Payton Hendrix	So
DE	13	Kolin Hill	So
ILB	34	D'Vonta Hinton	So
DL	53	Elisha Howard	So
DL	93	Ivory Jackson	Fr
OLB	41	Malik Jenkins	Sr
S	7	Jah'Shawn Johnson	So
LB	8	Jamile Johnson	Fr
DB	27	Adaryan Jones	So
DL	92	Noah Jones	Fr
LB	11	Jacarthy Mack	Jr
S	2	Tevin Madison	Jr
DL	57	Michael Mays	So
DL	98	Nick McCann	Fr
DL	88	Houston Miller	Fr
OLB	5	Gary Moore	Jr
DB	26	Kevin Moore	Fr
CB	31	Justis Nelson (C)	Sr
CB	17	Thierry Nguema	Sr
LB	54	Colin Nied	Fr
DT	59	Taylor Nunez	Jr
ILB	10	Johnathan Picone	Fr
NG	9	Ondre Pipkins	Sr
S	3	D.J. Polite-Bray	Jr
DB	22	Desmon Smith	Fr
ILB	37	Luke Stice (C)	Sr
LB	33	Brayden Stringer	Fr
DB	14	Christian Taylor	Fr
DL	99	Mychealon Thomas	Jr
DL	91	Kirby Vinson	Fr
DL	97	Joseph Wallace	Fr
S	15	Keenon Ward	Sr
NG	96	Broderick Washington Jr.	Fr
OLB	6	Kris Williams	Sr
OLB	39	Kahlee Woods	Jr

Special teams

Pos.	#	Name	Class
PK, P	49	Michael Barden	So
PK	48	Jake Daugherty	Fr
PK, P	96	Clayton Hatfield	So
LS	53	Kyle Heffron	Jr
LS	50	Jacob Herbig	Fr
LS	40	Connor Killian	Fr
LS	45	IV Seacat	Fr

Head coach

- Kliff Kingsbury

Coordinators/assistant coaches

- DeShaun Foster
- David Gibbs
- Lee Hays
- Emmett Jones
- Zach Kittley
  Graduate assistant
- Eric Morris
- Kevin Patrick
  Defensive line
- Joe Robinson
- Karl Scott
- Zac Spavital
- Rusty Whitt

Legend

- (C) Team captain
- (S) Suspended
- (I) Ineligible
- Injured
- Redshirt

Roster
Last update: 2016-Oct-24

== Season summary ==
=== Stephen F. Austin ===
Week One: Stephen F. Austin Lumberjacks at Texas Tech Red Raiders – Game summary

Quarter	1	2	3	4	Total
Lumberjacks	0	3	7	7	17
Red Raiders	21	24	10	14	69

at Jones AT&T Stadium, Lubbock, Texas

- Date: September 3
- Game time: 7:00 p.m. CDT
- Game weather: Temperature: 83 °F (28 °C) • Weather: Partly cloudy • Wind: S 16 MPH
- Game attendance: 60,454
- Referee: Cal McNeil
- TV: FSN
- Source: Big 12

Game information

First quarter

- TTU 12:22–Cameron Batson 13 yard pass from Patrick Mahomes (Clayton Hatfield kick) TTU 7–0 (10 plays, 75 yards, 2:38)
- TTU 6:03–Keke Coutee 6 yard run (Clayton Hatfield kick) TTU 14–0 (5 plays, 45 yards, 1:12)
- TTU 1:10–Patrick Mahomes 3 yard run (Clayton Hatfield kick) TTU 21–0 (8 plays, 69 yards, 2:46)

Second quarter

- TTU 13:12–Patrick Mahomes 7 yard run (Clayton Hatfield kick) TTU 28–0 (6 plays, 78 yards, 1:40)
- TTU 12:15–Jonathan Giles 22 yard pass from Patrick Mahomes (Clayton Hatfield kick) TTU 35–0 (1 play, 22 yards, 0:08)
- SFA 9:24–Storm Ruiz 43 yard field goal TTU 35–3 (11 plays, 49 yards, 2:51)
- TTU 4:33–Dylan Cantrell 8 yard pass from Patrick Mahomes (Clayton Hatfield kick) 42–3 (4 plays, 93 yards, 1:20)
- TTU 0:17–Clayton Hatfield 31 yard field goal TTU 45–3 (10 plays, 86 yards, 4:16)

Third quarter

- TTU 7:50–Devin Lauderdale 14 yard pass from Patrick Mahomes (Clayton Hatfield kick) TTU 52–3 (10 plays, 80 yards, 2:43)
- SFA 2:42–Justice Liggins 9 yard pass from Zach Conque (Storm Ruiz kick) TTU 52–10 (10 plays, 84 yards, 2:53)
- TTU 1:08–Clayton Hatfield 43 yard field goal TTU 55–10 (9 plays, 55 yards, 1:34)

Fourth quarter

- SFA 12:11–Tamrick Pace 38 yard pass from Hunter Taylor (Storm Ruiz kick) TTU 55–17 (5 plays, 75 yards, 1:38)
- TTU 3:25–Ja'Deion 9 yard pass from Nick Shimonek (Clayton Hatfield kick) TTU 62–27 (12 plays, 70 yards, 3:31)
- TTU 1:10–Corey Dauphine 27 yard run (Clayton Hatfield kick) TTU 69–17 (1 play, 27 yards, 0:18)

Leading Passers

- SFA – Zach Conque 28/49, 246 yards, TD, 2 INT
- TTU – Patrick Mahomes 30/43, 483 yards, 4 TD

Leading Rushers

- SFA – Joshawa West 12 carries, 51 yards
- TTU – Patrick Mahomes 10 carries, 57 yards, 2 TD

Leading Receivers

- SFA – Justice Liggins 10 receptions, 80 yards, 1 TD
- TTU – Jonathan Giles 4 receptions, 89 yards, 1 TD

The Red Raiders opened their 2016 season at home against the Stephen F. Austin Lumberjacks. Texas Tech's defense looked very improved compared to the previous two seasons, holding the Lumberjacks to only 370 total yards (with just 58 rushing yards), 24 first downs, and forcing 3 turnovers. With the win, the Red Raiders started a season 1-0 for the 12th year in a row.

=== At Arizona State ===
Week Two: Texas Tech Red Raiders at Arizona State Sun Devils – Game summary

Quarter	1	2	3	4	Total
Red Raiders	14	20	7	14	55
Sun Devils	9	28	14	17	68

at Sun Devil Stadium, Tempe, Arizona

- Date: September 10
- Game time: 9:00 p.m. CDT / 7:00 p.m. MST
- Game weather: Temperature: 101 °F (38 °C) • Weather: Mostly clear • Wind: W 4 MPH
- Game attendance: 44,511
- Referee: Scott Campbell
- TV: FS1
- Source: Big 12

Game information

First quarter

- ASU 10:13 – N'Keal Harry 10 yard pass from Manny Wilkins (Zane Gonzalez kick), ASU 7–0 (6 plays, 43 yards, 1:44)
- TTU 7:12 – Patrick Mahomes 1 yard run (Clayton Hatfield kick), tied 7–7 (8 plays, 47 yards, 3:00)
- ASU 5:33 – Texas Tech team safety, ASU 9–7 (1 play, -1 yard, 0:03)
- TTU 1:14 – Derrick Willies 59 yard pass from Patrick Mahomes (Clayton Hatfield kick), TTU 14–9 (6 plays, 98 yards, 1:46)

Second quarter

- ASU 13:17 – Kalen Ballage 1 yard run (Zane Gonzalez kick), ASU 16–14 (7 plays, 75 yards, 2:57)
- TTU 12:55 – Justin Stockton 75 yard pass from Patrick Mahomes (Clayton Hatfield kick), TTU 21–16 (2 plays, 75 yards, 0:22)
- ASU 11:18 – Kalen Ballage 38 yard pass from Many Wilkins (Zane Gonzalez kick), ASU 23–21 (4 plays, 85 yards, 1:24)
- ASU 8:30 – Kalen Ballage 1 yard run (Zane Gonzalez kick), ASU 30–21 (5 plays, 50 yards, 1:53)
- TTU 5:21 – Dylan Cantrell 11 yard pass from Patrick Mahomes, ASU 30–27 (9 plays, 75 yards, 3:09)
- ASU 2:17 – Kalen Ballage 4 yard run (Zane Gonzalez kick), ASU 37–27 (9 plays, 74 yards, 2:55)
- TTU 0:53 – Jonathan Giles 13 yard pass from Patrick Mahomes (Clayton Hatfield kick), ASU 37–34 (9 plays, 75 yards, 1:24)

Third quarter

- TTU 11:45 – Justin Stockton 1 yard run (Clayton Hatfield kick), TTU 41–37 (9 plays, 75 yards, 3:15)
- ASU 8:32 – Kalen Ballage 2 yard run (Zane Gonzalez kick), ASU 44–41 (7 plays, 84 yards, 3:08)
- ASU 0:43 – Kalen Ballage 7 yard run (Zane Gonzalez kick), ASU 51–41 (15 plays, 80 yards, 5:00)

Fourth quarter

- ASU 10:57 – Kalen Ballage 1 yard run (Zane Gonzalez kick), ASU 58–41 (1 play, 1 yard, 0:04)
- TTU 9:23 – Demarcus Felton 5 yard run (Clayton Hatfield kick), ASU 58–48 (6 plays, 75 yards, 1:34)
- ASU 9:11 – Kalen Ballage 75 yard run (Zane Gonzalez kick), ASU 65–48 (1 play, 75 yards, 0:12)
- TTU 8:16 – Cameron Batson 66 yard pass from Patrick Mahomes (Clayton Hatfield kick), ASU 65–55 (4 plays, 75 yards, 0:12)
- ASU 3:04 – Zane Gonzalez 43 yard field goal, ASU 68–55 (11 plays, 53 yards, 5:06)

Leading Passers

- TTU – Patrick Mahomes 38/53, 540 yards, 5 TD, 2 INT
- ASU – Manny Wilkins 28/37, 351 yards, 2 TD

Leading Rushers

- TTU – Patrick Mahomes 11 carries, 44 yards, TD
- ASU – Kalen Ballage 13 carries, 137 yards, 7 TD

Leading Receivers

- TTU – Cameron Batson 9 receptions, 148 yards, TD
- ASU – N'Keal Harry 6 receptions, 72 yards, TD

Texas Tech's defense fell apart against Arizona State, allowing the Sun Devils' Kalen Ballage to score 8 touchdowns (7 rushing, 1 receiving), tied for the NCAA record for most touchdowns in a game by a single player.

=== Louisiana Tech ===
Week Three: Louisiana Tech Bulldogs at Texas Tech Red Raiders (Celebrate Cotton Game) – Game summary

Quarter	1	2	3	4	Total
Bulldogs	3	14	14	14	45
Red Raiders	21	14	7	17	59

at Jones AT&T Stadium, Lubbock, Texas

- Date: September 17
- Game time: 6:00 p.m. CDT
- Game weather: Temperature: 78 °F (26 °C) • Weather: Cloudy • Wind: SSE 12 MPH
- Game attendance: 59,515
- Referee: Reggie Smith
- TV: FSN
- Source: Big 12

Game information

First quarter

- TTU 9:57 – Demarcus Felton 12 yard run (Clayton Hatfield kick), TTU 7–0
- LTU 4:06 – Jonathan Barnes 20 yard field goal, TTU 7–3
- TTU 3:41 – Jonathan Giles 64 yard pass from Patrick Mahomes (Clayton Hatfield kick), TTU 14–3
- TTU 2:07 – Jonathan Giles 36 yard pass from Patrick Mahomes (Clayton Hatfield kick), TTU 21–3

Second quarter

- LTU 14:45 – Kam McKnight 1 yard run (Jonathan Barnes kick), TTU 21–10
- TTU 12:04 – Dylan Cantrell 9 yard pass from Patrick Mahomes (Clayton Hatfield kick), TTU 28–10
- TTU 9:01 – Jonathan Giles 42 yard pass from Patrick Mahomes (Clayton Hatfield kick), TTU 35–10
- LTU 0:09 – Jarred Craft 1 yard run (Jonathan Barnes kick), TTU 35–17

Third quarter

- LTU 13:10 – Kam McNight 1 yard run (Jonathan Barnes kick), TTU 35–24
- TTU 6:17 – Cameron Batson 4 yard pass from Patrick Mahomes (Clayton Hatfield kick), TTU 42–24
- LTU 4:40 – Carlos Henderson 54 yard pass from Ryan Higgins (Jonathan Barnes kick), TTU 42–31

Fourth quarter

- TTU 14:21 – Demarcus Felton 8 yard run (Clayton Hatfield kick), TTU 49–31
- TTU 7:10 – Clayton Hatfield 24 yard field goal, TTU 52–31
- LTU 6:22 – Trent Taylor 76 yard pass from Ryan Higgins (Jonathan Barnes kick), TTU 52–38
- TTU 2:33 – Patrick Mahomes 2 yard run (Clayton Hatfield kick), TTU 59–38
- LTU 0:23 – Trent Taylor 37 yard pass from Ryan Higgins (Jonathan Barnes kick), TTU 59–45

Leading Passers

- LTU – Ryan Higgins 20/32, 311 yards, 3 TDs
- TTU – Patrick Mahomes 26/36, 470 yards, 5 TDs

Leading Rushers

- LTU – Jarred Craft 21 carries, 151 yards, TD
- TTU – Demarcus Felton 16 carries, 123 yards, 2 TDs

Leading Receivers

- LTU – Trent Taylor 7 receptions, 166 yards, 2 TDs
- TTU – Jonathan Giles 6 receptions, 186 yards, 3 TDs

Texas Tech completely dominated in the first quarter, with the offense scoring a touchdown on all of their drives and the defense holding Louisiana Tech to only a field goal. Fortune started to smile upon the Bulldogs late in the 2nd quarter, with Clayton Hatfield missing a 40-yard field goal with 2:18 left in the half. Following Hatfield's missed kick, Louisiana Tech went 78 yards to score a touchdown on Jarred Craft's 1 yard run. Gaining the ball back with 0:09 seconds left in the half, the Red Raiders took a knee to lead 35–17 at halftime.

The momentum continued for Louisiana Tech into the 3rd quarter, with the Bulldogs scoring on their opening possession of the half. The Red Raiders responded on their next drive with Patrick Mahomes finding Cameron Batson for a 4-yard touchdown pass. With Clayton Hatfield making the extra point, Texas Tech extended their lead to 42–24. Louisiana Tech quickly responded on their next possession with Ryan Higgins throwing a 54-yard touchdown pass to Carlos Henderson, Higgins's first touchdown pass of the night. The Red Raiders responded slowly on their next drive and suffered from several offensive holding penalties. The drive was capped off early in the 4th quarter with Demarcus Felton's 8 yard run for a touchdown. With Hatfield making the extra point, Texas Tech extended their lead to 49–31 with 14:21 left to play. Louisiana Tech came up short on the next drive, with the Bulldogs turning it over on downs, which eventually resulted in a 24-yard field goal from Hatfield. Louisiana Tech quickly scored on their next drive with Higgins finding Trent Taylor for a 76-yard touchdown reception. On the ensuing kickoff, the Bulldogs tried for an onside kick that was recovered by the Red Raiders. Louisiana Tech's Jordan Bradford was ejected late in the game for throwing a punch following Texas Tech's eighth touchdown of the game.

=== Kansas ===
Week Five: Kansas Jayhawks at Texas Tech Red Raiders – Game summary

Quarter	1	2	3	4	Total
Jayhawks	0	9	10	0	19
Red Raiders	14	14	13	14	55

at Jones AT&T Stadium, Lubbock, Texas

- Date: September 29
- Game time: 7:30 p.m. CDT
- Game weather: 74 °F (23 °C), Overcast
- Game attendance: 59,494
- TV: FS1

Game information

First quarter

- TTU 13:18 – Jonathan Giles 14 yard pass from Patrick Mahomes (Clayton Hatfield kick), TTU 7–0
- TTU 9:55 – Cameron Batson 18 yard pass from Patrick Mahomes (Clayton Hatfield kick), TTU 14–0

Second quarter

- TTU 14:53 – Keith Loneker, Jr. safety, TTU 14–2
- TTU 7:35 – Devin Lauderdale 17 yard pass from Patrick Mahomes (Clayton Hatfield kick), TTU 21–2
- KU 5:12 – Chase Harrell 18 yard pass from Ryan Willis (Matthew Wyman kick), TTU 21–9
- TTU 0:48 – Derrick Willis 6 yard pass from Patrick Mahomes (Clayton Hatfield kick), TTU 28–9

Third quarter

- KU 12:18 – Steven Sims, Jr. 11 yard pass from Montell Cozart (Matthew Wyman kick), TTU 28–16
- KU 7:22 – Matthew Wyman 35-yard field goal, TTU 28–19
- TTU 4:56 – Dylan Cantrell 4-yard pass from Nic Shimonek, TTU 34–19
- TTU 0:00 – Keke Coutee 37-yard pass from Nic Shimonek (Clayton Hatfield kick), TTU 41–19

Fourth quarter

- TTU 8:41 – Keke Coutee 31-yard pass from Nic Shimonek (Clayton Hatfield kick), TTU 48–19
- TTU 4:54 – Jonathan Giles 59-yard pass from Nic Shimonek (Clayton Hatfield kick), TTU 55–19

Leading passers

- KU – Ryan Willis 14/26, 142 yards, TD
- TTU – Patrick Mahomes 27/34, 277 yards, 4 TDs, INT

Leading rushers

- KU – Ke'aun Kinner 9 carries, 45 yards
- TTU – Demarcus Felton 11 carries, 48 yards

Leading receivers

- KU – Ben Johnson 5 receptions, 86 yards
- TTU – Jonathan Giles 12 receptions, 219 yards, 2 TDs

The Texas Tech Red Raiders opened conference play at home against the Kansas Jayhawks. Texas Tech starting quarterback Patrick Mahomes was injured midway through the third quarter with Nic Shimonek coming in as quarterback. Schimonek almost matched Mahomes's efficiency, throwing 15–of–21 for 271 yards and four touchdowns. The Red Raiders' offense scored 8 touchdowns in the game, with two different quarterbacks and six different receivers.

=== At Kansas State ===
Week Six: Texas Tech Red Raiders at Kansas State Wildcats – Game summary

Quarter	1	2	3	4	Total
Red Raiders	14	14	3	7	38
Wildcats	14	17	0	13	44

at Bill Snyder Family Stadium, Manhattan, Kansas

- Date: October 8
- Game time: 6:00 p.m. CDT
- Game weather: Temperature: 68 °F (20 °C) • Weather: clear • Wind: S 11 MPH
- Game attendance: 51,540
- Referee: Eddy Shelton
- TV announcers (ESPNU): Clay Matvick (play-by-play), Dusty Dvoracek (color), Shelley Smith (reporter)
- Source: Big 12

Game information

First quarter

- TTU 9:48 – Patrick Mahomes 1 yard run (Clayton Hatfield kick), TTU 7–0
- KSU 6:28 – Isaiah Zuber 12 yard pass from Jesse Ertz (Matthew McCrane kick), tied 7–7
- KSU 4:19 – D.J. Reed 35 yard interception return (Matthew McCrane kick), KSU 14–7
- TTU 2:38 – Keke Coutee 61 yard pass from Patrick Mahomes (Clayton Hatfield kick), tied 14–14

Second quarter

- KSU 14:09 – Matthew McCrane 20 yard field goal, KSU 17–14
- TTU 11:19 – Patrick Mahomes 16 yard run (Clayton Hatfield kick), TTU 21–17
- KSU 5:43 – Jesse Ertz 1 yard run (Matthew McCrane kick), KSU 24–21
- TTU 1:47 – Patrick Mahomes 3 yard run (Clayton Hatfield kick), TTU 28–24
- KSU 1:31 – Byron Pringle 99 yard kickoff return (Matthew McCrane kick), KSU 31–28

Third quarter

- TTU 5:17 – Clayton Hatfield 34 yard field goal, tied 31–31

Fourth quarter

- KSU 14:07 – Charles Jones 2 yard run (Matthew McCrane kick), KSU 38–31
- KSU 6:05 – Matthew McCrane 25 yard field goal, KSU 41–31
- KSU 1:56 – Matthew McCrane 42 yard field goal, KSU 44–31
- TTU 0:05 – Cameron Batson 15 yard pass from Patrick Mahomes (Clayton Hatfield kick), KSU 44–38

Leading Passers

- TTU – Patrick Mahomes 45/62, 504 yards, 2 TD, INT
- KSU – Jesse Ertz 10/20, 104 yards, TD

Leading Rushers

- TTU – Demarcus Felton 14 carries, 66 yards
- KSU – Charles Jones 19 carries, 128 yards, TD

Leading Receivers

- TTU – Keke Coutee5 receptions, 130 yards, TD
- KSU – Isaiah Zuber 3 receptions, 35 yards, TD

Despite leaving last week's game with a shoulder injury, Patrick Mahomes started as quarterback for the Red Raiders. Texas Tech had several miscues during the first half as a Mahomes pass was intercepted by D. J. Reed and returned 35 yards for a pick six touchdown. Later in the second quarter, Kansas State's Byron Pringle returned a kickoff 99 yards for a touchdown to give the Wildcats a 31–28 lead going into the half. Both teams slowed down in the third quarter, with the only score of the quarter coming from a 34-yard Clayton Hatfield field goal to tie the game 31–31. Kansas State opened the game up during the fourth, leading 44–31 with just under 2 minutes to go. Despite trailing by 13 with little time left, the Red Raiders refused to give up. Texas Tech scored a touchdown with 5 seconds left and trailed 38–44. The Red Raiders recovered an onside kick with the hope of a comeback still alive, but Mahomes was sacked on the next play to end the game.

=== No. 20 West Virginia ===
Week Seven: No. 20 West Virginia Mountaineers at Texas Tech Red Raiders – Game summary

Quarter	1	2	3	4	Total
No. 20 Mountaineers	10	14	3	21	48
Red Raiders	7	0	3	7	17

at Jones AT&T Stadium, Lubbock, Texas

- Date: October 15
- Game time: 11:00 a.m. CDT
- Game weather: Sunny, 82 °F (28 °C)
- Game attendance: 54,111
- TV: FS1

Game information

First quarter

- WVU 9:30 – Justin Crawford 10 yard run (Mike Molina kick), WVU 7–0
- TTU 1:51 – Jonathan Giles 44 yard pass from Patrick Mahomes (Clayton Hatfield kick), tied 7–7
- WVU 0:17 – Mike Molina 34 yard field goal, WVU 10–7

Second quarter

- WVU 7:03 – Justin Crawford 5 yard pass from Skyler Howard (Mike Molina kick), WVU 17–7
- WVU 4:22 – Skyler Howard 8 yard run (Mike Molina kick), WVU 24–7

Third quarter

- TTU 10:04 – Clayton Hatfield 42 yard field goal, WVU 24–10
- WVU 6:04 – Mike Molina 22 yard field goal, WVU 27–10

Fourth quarter

- WVU 14:51 – Skyler Howard 1 yard run (Mike Molina kick), WVU 34–10
- WVU 10:24 – Rushel Shell III 14 yard run (Mike Molina kick), WVU 41–10
- TTU 8:13 – Jonathan Giles 16 yard pass from Nic Shimonek (Clayton Hatfield kick), WVU 41–17
- WVU 2:16 – Rushel Shell III 3 yard run (Mike Molina kick), WVU 48–17

Leading Passers

- WVU – Skyler Howard 21/31, 318 yards, TD
- TTU – Patrick Mahomes 28/44, 305 yards, TD, INT

Leading Rushers

- WVU – Rushel Shell 21 carries, 104 yards, 2 TD
- TTU – Da'Leon Ward 6 carries, 27 yards

Leading Receivers

- WVU – Daikiel Shorts, Jr. 3 receptions, 100 yards
- TTU – Jonathan Giles 8 receptions, 136 yards, 2 TD

=== No. 16 Oklahoma ===
Week Eight: #16 Oklahoma Sooners at Texas Tech Red Raiders – Game summary

Quarter	1	2	3	4	Total
No. 16 Sooners	13	17	21	15	66
Red Raiders	10	14	14	21	59

at Jones AT&T Stadium, Lubbock, Texas

- Date: October 22
- Game time: 7:00 p.m. CDT
- Game weather: Temperature: 72 °F (22 °C) • Weather: clear • Wind: S 9 MPH
- Game attendance: 60,478
- Referee: Cooper Castleberry
- TV announcers (FOX): Joe Davis (Play-By-Play), Brady Quinn (Color) & Bruce Feldman (Sideline)
- Source: Big 12

Game information

First quarter

- OKLA 13:23 – Joe Mixon 56 yard pass from Baker Mayfield (Austin Seibert PAT missed), OKLA 6–0
- OKLA 11:28 – Dede Westbrook 49 yard pass from Baker Mayfield (Austin Seibert kick), OKLA 13–0
- TTU 7:23 – Da'Leon Ward 4 yard run (Clayton Hatfield kick), OKLA 13–7
- TTU 1:06 – Clayton Hatfield 37 yard field goal, OKLA 13–10

Second quarter

- OKLA 13:13 – Joe Mixon 46 yard run (Austin Seibert kick), OKLA 20–10
- TTU 9:06 – Patrick Mahomes 11 yard run (Clayton Hatfield kick), OKLA 20–17
- OKLA 6:14 – Austin Seibert 23 yard field goal, OKLA 23–17
- TTU 0:37 – Jonathan Giles 23 yard pass from Patrick Mahomes (Clayton Hatfield kick), TTU 24–23
- OKLA 0:17 – Nick Basquine 23 yard pass from Baker Mayfield (Austin Seibert kick), OKLA 30–24

Third quarter

- OKLA 11:51 – Dede Westbrook 23 yard pass from Baker Mayfield (Austin Seibert kick), OKLA 37–24
- TTU 9:33 – Reginald Davis III 32 yard pass from Patrick Mahomes (Clayton Hatfield kick), OKLA 37–31
- OKLA 7:59 – Joe Mixon 43 yard pass from Baker Mayfield (Austin Seibert kick), OKLA 44–31
- TTU 4:10 – Jonathan Giles 41 yard pass from Patrick Mahomes (Clayton Hatfield kick), OKLA 44–38
- OKLA 1:36 – Dimitri Flowers 34 yard pass from Baker Mayfield (Austin Seibert kick), OKLA 51–38

Fourth quarter

- TTU 12:57 – Patrick Mahomes 22 yard run (Clayton Hatfield kick), OKLA 51–45
- OKLA 9:15 – Joe Mixon 15 yard pass from Baker Mayfield (Mayfield to Westbrook for two–point conversion), OKLA 59–45
- TTU 7:56 – Keke Coutee 56 yard pass from Patrick Mahomes (Clayton Hatfield kick), OKLA 59–52
- OKLA 5:03 – Joe Mixon 42 yard run (Austin Seibert kick), OKLA 66–52
- TTU 1:38 – Cameron Batson 3 yard pass from Patrick Mahomes (Clayton Hatfield kick), OKLA 66–59

Leading Passers

- OKLA – Baker Mayfield – 27/36, 545 yards, 7 TD
- TTU – Patrick Mahomes – 52/88, 734 yards, 5 TD, INT

Leading Rushers

- OKLA – Joe Mixon – 31 carries, 263 yards, 2 TD
- TTU – Patrick Mahomes – 12 carries, 85 yards, 2 TD

Leading Receivers

- OKLA – Dede Westbrook – 9 receptions, 202 yards, 2 TD
- TTU – Keke Coutee – 10 receptions, 172 yards, TD

The Red Raiders and Sooners broke the NCAA record for combined offensive yards in a single game with a total of 1,708 yards, with each team having 854 yards. Texas Tech quarterback Patrick Mahomes tied the record for most passing yards in a single game with 734 yards, while the combined 125 points is the second most points in a game involving a ranked team.

=== At TCU ===
Week Nine: Texas Tech Red Raiders at TCU Horned Frogs – Game summary

Quarter	1	2	3	4	OT	2OT	Total
Red Raiders	0	10	0	7	7	3	27
Horned Frogs	7	3	0	7	7	0	24

at Amon G. Carter Stadium, Fort Worth, Texas

- Date: October 29
- Game time: 2:30 p.m. CDT
- Game weather: Temperature: 85 °F (29 °C) • weather: sunny with some clouds • wind: S 14 MPH
- Game attendance: 45,619
- Referee: Dan Romeo
- TV: ESPN2
- Source: Big 12

Game information

First quarter

- TCU 4:40 – Derrick Green 2 yard run (Brandon Hatfield kick), TCU 7–0

Second quarter

- TTU 13:23 – Reggie Davis 33 yard pass from Patrick Mahomes (Clayton Hatfield kick), tied 7–7
- TCU 9:33 – Brandon Hatfield 23 yard field goal, TCU 10–7
- TTU 6:49 – Clayton Hatfield 41 yard field goal, tied 10–10

Third quarter

- No scoring plays

Fourth quarter

- TCU 14:37 – Trevorris Johnson 1 yard run (Brandon Hatfield kick), TCU 17–10
- TTU 1:28 – Dylan Cantrell 8 yard pass from Patrick Mahomes (Clayton Hatfield kick), tied 17–17

Overtime

- TTU – Patrick Mahomes 15 yard run (Clayton Hatfield kick), TTU 24–17
- TCU – Desmon White 25 yard pass from Foster Sawyer (Brandon Hatfield kick), tied 24–24

Second overtime

- TTU – Clayton Hatfield 37 yard field goal, TTU 27–24

Leading Passers

- TTU – Patrick Mahomes 24/39, 206 yards, 2 TD, INT
- TCU – Kenny Hill 16/29, 160 yards, INT

Leading Rushers

- TTU – Da'Leon Ward 23 carries, 98 yards
- TCU – Sewo Olonilua 7 carries, 48 yards

Leading Receivers

- TTU – Da'Leon Ward 8 receptions, 49 yards
- TCU – Taj Williams 4 receptions, 52 yards

Texas Tech came into Amon G. Carter Stadium looking to break a 3-game losing streak on the season. The Red Raiders received the opening kickoff, but came up short when a pass by Patrick Mahomes was intercepted by Nick Orr at the TCU 1 yard line. The Horned Frogs capitalized on the turnover with a 2-yard touchdown run from Derrick Green. With Brandon Hatfield making the extra point, TCU led 7–0 with 4:40 in the 1st quarter. Tech's offensive struggles continued on their next possession when Mahomes was sacked at and fumbled the ball at the Texas Tech 23 yard line. The Red Raiders caught a break when TCU kicker Brandon Hatfield missed a 37-yard field goal.

Tech took advantage of the missed field goal by scoring a touchdown on the following possession with Mahomes finding Reggie Davis for a 33-yard touchdown pass. With Clayton Hatfield making the kick, the Red Raiders tied the game at 7–7 with 13:23 left in the 2nd quarter. The Horned Frogs responded to Tech's touchdown on their next possession with a 23-yard field goal from Brandon Hatfield to lead 10–7. The Red Raiders responded on their next possession with a 41-yard field goal to tie the game 10–10 with 6:49 left in the half. The two teams traded punts before the first half ended with a 10–10 tie.

TCU quarterback Kenny Hill threw an interception on the Horned Frogs' second possession of the half and was pulled from the game in favor of Foster Sawyer. TCU's defense forced a three and out after the interception and Texas Tech was forced to put, but on the ensuing punt, punter Michael Barden fumbled the ball and TCU recovered it at their own 15 yard line. The Horned Frogs capitalized on the fumble with a 1-yard touchdown run from Trevorris Johnson. With Brandon Hatfield making the extra point, TCU took a 17–10 lead with 14:37 left in regulation following a scoreless third quarter. Texas Tech was forced to punt on their next possession and TCU made it to the Texas Tech 15 and was forced to try a field goal, but Brandon Hatfield missed the 32 yard try. Like before, the Red Raiders scored a touchdown following the Horned Frogs' missed field goal. With 1:28 left in regulation, Mahomes found Dylan Cantrell for an 8-yard touchdown pass and Clayton Hatfield made the extra point to tie the game 17–17. On the final play of regulation, TCU tried a game–winning Hail Mary pass, but it fell incomplete.

The Red Raiders received the ball first in overtime and scored on a 15-yard touchdown run from Mahomes. With Clayton Hatfield making the extra point, Texas Tech led 24–17, their first lead of the game. TCU responded on their try with a 25-yard touchdown pass from Foster Sawyer to Desmon White. With Brandon Hatfield making the extra point, the game entered into 2nd overtime tied at 24–24. The Horned Frogs had the ball first in 2nd overtime, but Brandon Hatfield missed a 39-yard field goal that fell short and was nowhere close to the goal posts. Receiving the ball, the Red Raiders played conservatively and only gained 5 yards before Clayton Hatfield was brought on to try the game-winning field goal. Clayton Hatfield made a 37-yard field goal to upset TCU with a 27–24 victory in double overtime.

TCU's kicker Brandon Hatfield was 1/4 on field goals during the game, while the Texas Tech offense was held to a season low 345 yards.

=== Texas ===
Week Ten: Texas Longhorns at Texas Tech Red Raiders – Game summary

Quarter	1	2	3	4	Total
Longhorns	14	10	14	7	45
Red Raiders	16	7	7	7	37

at Jones AT&T Stadium, Lubbock, Texas

- Date: November 5
- Game time: 11:00 a.m. CDT
- Game weather: Temperature: 53 °F (12 °C) • Weather: fog/mist • Wind: E 10 MPH
- Game attendance: 60,803
- Referee: Brad van Vark
- TV announcers (FS1): Tim Brando (play-by-play), Spencer Tillman (color), Bruce Feldman (sideline)
- Source: Big 12

Game information

First quarter

- TTU 11:37 – Cameron Batson 3 yard pass from Patrick Mahomes (Clayton Hatfield kick), TTU 7–0
- TEX 10:43 – D'Onta Foreman 4 yard run (Trent Domingue kick), tied 7–7
- TTU 7:02 – Clayton Hatfield 42 yard field goal, TTU 10–7
- TEX 4:30 – Collin Johnson 16 yard pass from Shane Buechele (Trent Domingue kick), TEX 14–10
- TTU 1:23 – Jonathan Giles 6 yard pass from Patrick Mahomes (Clayton Hatfield kick blocked), TTU 16–14

Second quarter

- TTU 7:50 – Douglas Coleman 100 yard fumble return (Clayton Hatfield kick), TTU 23–14
- TEX 3:01 – Collin Johnson 9 yard pass from Shane Buechele (Trent Domingue kick), TTU 23–21
- TEX 0:26 – Trent Domingue 29 yard field goal, TEX 24–23

Third quarter

- TEX 11:57 – Tyrone Swoopes 4 yard run (Trent Domingue kick), TEX 31–23
- TTU 7:33 – Cameron Batson 7 yard pass from Patrick Mahomes (Clayton Hatfield kick), TEX 31–30
- TEX 6:15 – D'Onta Foreman 38 yard run (Trent Domingue kick), TEX 38–30

Fourth quarter

- TEX 14:49 – D'Onta Foreman 74 yard run (Trent Domingue kick), TEX 45–30
- TTU 10:50 – Da'Leon Ward 9 yard run (Clayton Hatfield kick), TEX 45–37

Leading Passers

- TEX – Shane Buechele 20/40, 244 yards, 2 TD
- TTU – Patrick Mahomes 36/59, 367 yards, 3 TD, INT

Leading Rushers

- TEX – D'Onta Foreman 33 carries, 341 yards, 3 TD
- TTU – Da'Leon Ward 22 carries, 93 yards, TD

Leading Receivers

- TEX – Jake Oliver 3 receptions, 76 yards
- TTU – Dylan Cantrell 8 receptions, 89 yards

=== At No. 17 Oklahoma State ===
Week Eleven: Texas Tech Red Raiders at No. 17 Oklahoma State Cowboys – Game summary

Quarter	1	2	3	4	Total
Red Raiders	7	21	7	9	44
No. 17 Cowboys	21	7	17	0	45

at Boone Pickens Stadium, Stillwater, Oklahoma

- Date: November 12
- Game time: 2:30 p.m.
- Game weather: Temperature: 63 °F (17 °C) • Weather: sunny, clear • Wind: NE 4 MPH
- Game attendance: 54,288
- Referee: Mike Defee
- TV announcers (FS1): Tim Brando (play-by-play), Spencer Tillman (color), Bruce Feldman (sideline)
- Source: Big 12

Game information

First quarter

- OKST 12:14 – Jalen McCleskey 26 yard pass from Mason Rudolph (Ben Grogan kick), OKST 7–0
- OKST 6:20 – Mason Rudolph 9 yard run (Ben Grogan kick), OKST 14–0
- TTU 2:14 – Patrick Mahomes 4 yard run (Clayton Hatfield kick), OKST 14–7
- OKST 0:21 – Chris Carson 1 yard run (Ben Grogan kick), OKST 21–7

Second quarter

- TTU 11:23 – Dylan Cantrell 4 yard pass from Patrick Mahomes (Clayton Hatfield kick), OKST 21–14
- OKST 8:55 – Justice Hill 8 yard run (Ben Grogan kick), OKST 28–14
- TTU 3:44 – Justin Stockton 3 yard pass from Patrick Mahomes (Clayton Hatfield kick), OKST 28–14
- TTU 0:27 – Donta Thompson 5 yard pass from Patrick Mahomes (Claytonh Hatfield kick), tied 28–28

Third quarter

- OKST 7:25 – Chris Carson 19 yard run (Ben Grogan kick), OKST 35–28
- OKST 2:04 – Ben Grogan 27 yard field goal, OKST 38–28
- TTU 0:24 – Patrick Mahomes 7 yard run (Clayton Hatfield kick), OKST 38–35
- OKST 0:06 – James Washington 82 yard pass from Mason Rudolph (Ben Grogan kick), OKST 45–35

Fourth quarter

- TTU 9:23 – Clayton Hatfield 27 yard field goal, OKST 45–38
- TTU 1:44 – Quinton White 1 yard run (Clayton Hatfield PAT missed), OKST 45–44

Leading Passers

- TTU – Patrick Mahomes: 34/51, 344 yards, 3 TD
- OKST – Mason Rudolph: 20/28, 395 yards, 2 TD

Leading Rushers

- TTU – Demarcus Felton: 10 carries, 77 yards
- OKST – Justice Hill: 18 carries, 126 yards, TD

Leading Receivers

- TTU – Jonathan Giles: 5 receptions, 77 yards
- OKST – James Washington: 6 receptions, 158 yards, TD

Despite suffering numerous injuries throughout the game on both offense and defense, the Red Raiders refused to go without a fight against the Cowboys. With 1:44 left in the game, Texas Tech fullback Quinton White, who was in the game as a running back, found the endzone on a 1-yard touchdown run, but Clayton Hatfield missed the game-tying extra point. With Hatfield missing the extra point, Texas Tech fell to Oklahoma State 44–45.

=== At Iowa State ===
Week Twelve:Texas Tech Red Raiders at Iowa State Cyclones – Game summary

Quarter	1	2	3	4	Total
Red Raiders	3	0	7	0	10
Cyclones	14	31	7	14	66

at Jack Trice Stadium, Ames, Iowa

- Date: November 19
- Game time: 2:30 p.m.
- Game weather: Temperature: 38 °F (3 °C) • Weather: sunny • Wind: NW 17 miles per hour (27 km/h)
- Game attendance: 50,787
- TV: FS1

Game information

First quarter

- ISU 11:17 – Joel Lanning 24 yard run (Cole Netten kick), ISU 7–0
- TTU 6:17 – Clayton Hatfield 31 yard field goal, ISU 7–3
- ISU 2:21 – Jacob Park 2 yard run (Cole Netten kick), ISU 14–3

Second quarter

- ISU 14:52 – Allen Lazard 34 yard pass from Cole Park (Cole Netten kick), ISU 21–3
- ISU 12:27 – Joel Lanning 5 yard run (Cole Netten kick), ISU 28–3
- ISU 7:47 – Hakeem Butler 39 yard pass from Jacob Park (Cole Netten kick), ISU 35–3
- ISU 6:50 – Kamari Cotton-Moya 48 interception return (Cole Netten kick), ISU 42–3
- ISU 0:00 – Cole Netten 27 yard field goal, ISU 45–3

Third quarter

- TTU 7:17 – Keke Coutee 11 yard pass from Patrick Mahomes (Clayton Hatfield kick), ISU 45–10
- ISU 4:13 – Joel Lanning 19 yard run (Cole Netten kick), ISU 52–10

Fourth quarter

- ISU 14:19 – Joel Lanning 35 yard run (Cole Netten kick), ISU 59–10
- ISU 8:39 – Joel Lanning 10 yard run (Cole Netten kick), ISU 66–10

Leading Passers

- TTU – Patrick Mahomes 18/36, 219 yards, TD, 2 INT
- ISU – Jacob Park 14/18, 285 yards, 2 TD

Leading Rushers

- TTU – Da'Leon Ward 25 carries, 97 yards
- ISU – Joel Lanning 17 carries, 171 yards, 5 TD

Leading Receivers

- TTU – Keke Coutee 8 receptions, 115 yards, TD
- ISU – Allen Lazard 7 receptions, 137 yards, TD

=== Vs. Baylor ===
Week Thirteen: Baylor Bears vs. Texas Tech Red Raiders (Texas Farm Bureau Insurance Shootout) – Game summary

Quarter	1	2	3	4	Total
Bears	7	14	7	7	35
Red Raiders	20	21	10	3	54

at AT&T Stadium, Arlington, Texas

- Date: November 25
- Game time: 5:00 p.m.
- Game weather: None (retractable roof closed)
- Game attendance: 41,656
- Referee: Brad van Vark
- TV announcers (ESPN): Clay Matvick (play-by-play), Dusty Dvoracek (color), Shelley Smith (reporter)
- Source: Big 12

Game information

First quarter

- BAY 12:43 – K.D. Cannon 53 yard pass from Zach Smith (Chris Callahan kick), BAY 7–0
- TTU 8:05 – Keke Coutee 35 yard pass from Patrick Mahomes (Clayton Hatfield kick), tied 7–7
- TTU 6:09 – Dylan Cantrell 40 yard pass from Patrick Mahomes (Clayton Hatfield PAT failed), TTU 13–7
- TTU 3:13 – Da'Leon Ward 5 yard run (Clayton Hatfield kick), TTU 20–7

Second quarter

- TTU 9:32 – Quan Shorts 81 yard pass from Patrick Mahomes (Clayton Hatfield kick), TTU 27–7
- TTU 7:19 – Keke Coutee 80 yard pass from Patrick Mahomes (Clayton Hatfield kick), TTU 34–7
- BAY 6:23 – Terence Williams 9 yard run (Chris Callahan kick), TTU 34–14
- TTU 4:50 – Jonathan Giles 62 yard pass from Patrick Mahomes (Clayton Hatfield kick), TTU 41–14
- BAY 0:56 – Ishmael Zamora 21 yard pass from Zach Smith (Chris Callahan kick), TTU 41–21

Third quarter

- TTU 10:26 – Dylan Cantrell 6 yard pass from Patrick Mahomes (Clayton Hatfield kick), TTU 48–21
- BAY 9:37 – Terence Williams 2 yard run (Chris Callahan kick), TTU 48–28
- TTU 5:52 – Clayton Hatfield 31 yard field goal, TTU 51–28

Fourth quarter

- BAY 14:36 – K.D. Cannon 9 yard pass from Zach Smith (Chris Callahan kick), TTU 51–35
- TTU 11:09 – Clayton Hatfield 27 yard field goal, TTU 54–35

Leading Passers

- BAY – Zach Smith 30/46, 377 yards, 3 TD, INT
- TTU – Patrick Mahomes 30/46, 586 yards, 6 TD

Leading Rushers

- BAY – Terence Williams 23 carries, 147 yards, 2 TD
- TTU – Da'Leon Ward 20 carries, 82 yards, TD

Leading Receivers

- BAY – Ishmael Zamora 12 receptions, 155 yards, TD
- TTU – Keke Coutee 8 receptions, 221 yards, 2 TD

== Statistics ==
=== Scoring ===
Scores against all opponents

	1	2	3	4	OT	2OT	Total
Opponents	112	167	114	122	7	0	522
Texas Tech	147	159	88	120	7	3	524

Scores against the Big 12

	1	2	3	4	OT	2OT	Total
Opponents	100	122	79	84	7	0	392
Texas Tech	91	101	64	75	7	3	341

=== Offense ===
Passing statistics
#	POS	NAME	RAT	CMP	ATT	YDS	AVG	CMP%	TD	INT	LONG	Ref
5	QB	Patrick Mahomes	157.0	388	591	5,052	8.5	65.7	41	10	81	
16	QB	Nic Shimonek	163.4	38	58	464	8.0	65.5	6	1	59	
13	WR	Cameron Batson	155.0	1	2	25	12.5	50.0	0	0	25	
49	PK/P	Michael Barden	226.0	1	1	15	15.0	100.0	0	0	15	
		TOTALS	157.4	428	653	5,556	8.5	65.5	47	11	81	

Rushing statistics
#	POS	NAME	CAR	YDS	AVG	LONG	TD	Ref
32	RB	Da'Leon Ward	103	428	4.2	15	3	
27	RB	Demarcus Felton	64	354	5.5	31	3	
5	QB	Patrick Mahomes	131	285	2.2	32	12	
4	RB	Justin Stockton	53	154	2.9	11	1	
23	RB	Quinton White, Jr.	13	28	2.2	5	1	
21	RB	Corey Dauphine	2	25	12.5	27	1	
49	PK/P	Michael Barden	2	14	7.0	25	0	
13	WR	Cameron Batson	2	4	2.0	4	0	
30	RB	Caleb Woodward	1	2	2.0	2	0	
20	WR	Keke Coutee	3	2	0.7	6	1	
		TOTALS	389	1,243	3.2	32	22	

Receiving statistics
#	POS	NAME	REC	YDS	AVG	LONG	TD	Ref
9	WR	Jonathan Giles	69	1,158	16.8	64	13	
20	WR	Keke Coutee	55	890	16.2	80	7	
14	WR	Dylan Cantrell	58	675	11.6	54	8	
13	WR	Cameron Batson	60	644	10.7	66	8	
12	WR	Ian Sadler	24	363	15.1	37	0	
6	WR	Devin Lauderdale	31	307	9.9	41	2	
11	WR	Derrick Willies	18	288	16.0	59	2	
2	WR	Reginald Davis III	15	247	16.5	59	2	
4	RB	Justin Stockton	21	220	10.5	75	2	
32	RB	Da'Leon Ward	18	131	7.3	29	0	
8	WR	Tony Brown	13	128	9.8	23	0	
1	WR	Quan Shorts	5	124	24.8	81	1	
23	RB	Quinton White, Jr.	13	117	9.0	25	0	
29	FB	Mason Reed	5	96	19.2	24	0	
88	WR	Ja'Deion High	6	54	9.0	15	1	
87	WR	Kash Knutson	5	45	9.0	22	0	
27	RB	Demarcus Felton	7	31	4.4	10	0	
59	DT	Taylor Nunez	1	15	15.0	15	0	
34	WR	Hunter Rittimann	1	9	9.0	9	0	
86	WR	T. J. Vasher	2	9	4.5	6	0	
79	OL	Travis Bruffy	1	5	5.0	5	1	
		TOTALS	428	'5,556	13.0	81	47	

=== Special teams ===
Kicking statistics
#	Name	FGM	FGA	PCT	1–19	20–29	30–39	40–49	50+	LNG	XPM	XPA	PTS	Ref
96	Clayton Hatfield	13	14	92.9	0/0	3/3	6/6	4/5	0/0	43	65	70	104	

== Weekly awards ==
- Big 12 Offensive Player of the Week

Patrick Mahomes (week 2 vs. Arizona State)
Patrick Mahomes* (week 8 vs. Oklahoma)

• *co-offensive player of the week
