= List of Oklahoma Sooners starting quarterbacks =

This is a list of the starting quarterbacks for the Oklahoma Sooners football teams since 1948.

== Key ==
†	Elected to the College Football Hall of Fame
‡	Heisman Trophy winner
(#)	Games started

== Quarterbacks ==
Season	Quarterback(s)	Reference(s)
1948	Jack Mitchell	
1949	Darrel Royal	
1950	Claude Arnold	
1951	Eddie Crowder	
1952	Eddie Crowder	
1953	Gene Calame (8), Buddy Leake (3)	
1954	Gene Calame, Jimmy Harris	
1955	Jimmy Harris	
1956	Jimmy Harris	
1957	David Baker, Carl Dodd, Brewster Hobby	
1958	Brewster Hobby	
1959	Bob Cornell	
1960	Jimmy Carpenter	
1961	Bob Page	
1962	Monte Deere, Ronnie Fletcher	
1963	Ronnie Fletcher, Bobby Page, Mike Ringer	
1964	Ronnie Fletcher, John Hammond, Bobby Page, Mike Ringer	
1965	John Hammond, Mike Ringer	
1966	Bobby Warmack	
1967	Bobby Warmack	
1968	Bobby Warmack	
1969	Jack Mildren	
1970	Jack Mildren	
1971	Jack Mildren	
1972	Dave Robertson	
1973	Steve Davis	
1974	Steve Davis	
1975	Steve Davis	
1976	Dean Blevins, Thomas Lott	
1977	Thomas Lott	
1978	Thomas Lott	
1979	J. C. Watts	
1980	J. C. Watts	
1981	Darrell Shepard	
1982	Kelly Phelps	
1983	Danny Bradley	
1984	Danny Bradley (10), Troy Aikman (1)	
1985	Jamelle Holieway (8), Troy Aikman^{†} (4)	
1986	Jamelle Holieway	
1987	Jamelle Holieway (9), Charles Thompson (3)	
1988	Jamelle Holieway	
1989	Steve Collins (5), Tink Collins (5), Chris Melson (1)	
1990	Steve Collins (6), Cale Gundy (5)	
1991	Cale Gundy (11), Steve Collins (1)	
1992	Cale Gundy (9), Steve Collins (2)	
1993	Cale Gundy (12)	
1994	Garrick McGee (11), Terence Brown (1)	
1995	Eric Moore (11)	
1996	Justin Fuente (8), Eric Moore (3)	
1997	Brandon Daniels, Justin Fuente, Eric Moore	
1998	Brandon Daniels (5+), Jake Sills (1+), Eric Moore (1), Patrick Fletcher, Jarrod Reese	
1999	Josh Heupel (12)	
2000	Josh Heupel (13)	
2001	Nate Hybl (9), Jason White^{‡} (3)	
2002	Jason White (2)^{‡}, Nate Hybl (10)	
2003	Jason White^{‡} (14)	
2004	Jason White^{‡} (13)	
2005	Rhett Bomar (11), Paul Thompson (1)	
2006	Paul Thompson (14)	
2007	Sam Bradford^{‡} (14)	
2008	Sam Bradford^{‡} (14)	
2009	Landry Jones (10), Sam Bradford^{‡} (3)	
2010	Landry Jones (13)	
2011	Landry Jones (13)	
2012	Landry Jones (13)	
2013	Blake Bell (8), Trevor Knight (5)	
2014	Trevor Knight (10) Cody Thomas (3)	
2015	Baker Mayfield^{‡} (13)	
2016	Baker Mayfield^{‡} (13)	
2017	Baker Mayfield^{‡} (12) Kyler Murray^{‡}(1)	
2018	Kyler Murray^{‡} (12) Austin Kendall (1)	
2019	Jalen Hurts (13)	
2020	Spencer Rattler (13)	
2021	Spencer Rattler (6), Caleb Williams^{‡} (6)	
2022	Dillon Gabriel (11), Davis Beville (1)	
2023	Dillon Gabriel (12), Jackson Arnold (1)	
2024	Jackson Arnold (9) Michael Hawkins Jr. (4)	
2025	John Mateer (12) Michael Hawkins Jr. (1)	
2026	John Mateer (6)	
