= 2016 Oklahoma vs. Texas Tech football game =

Big 12 Conference game

2016 Oklahoma vs. Texas Tech
- Conference game
Oklahoma Sooners	Texas Tech Red Raiders
(4–2)	(3–3)
66	59
Head coach: Bob Stoops	Head coach: Kliff Kingsbury
AP / Coaches; 16 / 16
	1	2	3	4	Total
Oklahoma	13	17	21	15	66
Texas Tech	10	14	14	21	59
- Date: October 22, 2016
- Season: 2016
- Stadium: Jones AT&T Stadium
- Location: Lubbock, Texas
- Referee: Cooper Castleberry
- Attendance: 60,478

United States TV coverage
- Network: Fox
- Announcers: Joe Davis, Brady Quinn & Bruce Feldman

The 2016 Oklahoma vs. Texas Tech football game was a Big 12 Conference college football game played between the Oklahoma Sooners and Texas Tech Red Raiders at Jones AT&T Stadium in Lubbock, Texas. Oklahoma came into the game ranked at No. 16 in both the AP Poll and Coaches Poll while Texas Tech was unranked. The quarterback for the Sooners, Baker Mayfield, had played for the Red Raiders 3 years before this game.

Both teams broke several NCAA and school records during the game. The two teams combined for a total of 1,708 yards, the most yards in a Division I game.

== Prior to the game ==
The two teams first met on September 3, 1992, playing in Lubbock; Oklahoma won the game 34–9. At the time, Oklahoma was a member of the Big Eight Conference and Texas Tech the Southwest Conference. Both the Sooners and Red Raiders would join the Big 12 Conference in 1996, playing their first game as conference opponents in Norman, Oklahoma on November 23 of that year, with Texas Tech winning 22–12. Heading into the game, Oklahoma led the series 17–3.

== Game summary ==
=== First quarter ===
The Sooners received the opening kickoff, starting at their own 25-yard line. On the first play from scrimmage, Joe Mixon was tackled for a loss of 1-yard. Oklahoma quickly set the tempo for the game, going downfield in just over a minute and a half to score the first touchdown of the game with a 56-yard pass to Mixon from Baker Mayfield; Austin Seibert missed the extra point to make the score 6–0. Following the Oklahoma touchdown, Texas Tech's offense started at their own 22-yard line, but a penalty against Oklahoma moved the Red Raiders up 5 yards. The drive was short, with Jonathan Giles fumbling the ball near midfield and was recovered by Jordan Evans for the Sooners. Following the fumble, Oklahoma scored quickly in just 3 plays in under a minute to extend the lead to 13–0. The Red Raiders got their first touchdown on the next drive with a 4-yard run from Da'Leon Ward; following Clayton Hatfield's extra point, Texas Tech trailed 7–13. Oklahoma failed to score on the next drive, one of the few drives in the game to not end in a score, having to punt the ball away. The Red Raiders made it to Oklahoma's 20-yard line, but had to settle for a 37-yard field goal from Hatfield. Oklahoma's offense went three-and-out on their next drive, with the quarter ending before they punted the ball. At the end of the first quarter, Oklahoma had a 13–10 lead over Texas Tech.

=== Second quarter ===
The second quarter started with Oklahoma punting the ball. Texas Tech in turn would punt on its next possession, only gaining 1 yard on the drive. On the Sooners' first play they were penalized for an ineligible receiver down field, moving back to the Texas Tech 46-yard line. On the following play, Joe Mixon would run 46 yards for a touchdown to extend the lead to 20–10. The Red Raiders' next drive would be the longest drive of the game for either team in both number of plays and time of possession; the drive lasted for 14 plays and 4:25, ending with an 11-yard touchdown run from Patrick Mahomes. Oklahoma would respond with a 23-yard field goal from Seibert on its next drive to lead 23–17. On the next drive, the Red Raiders made it to the Oklahoma 20-yard line, but a Mahomes pass was intercepted near the end zone by Steven Parker; the Sooners would fail to score off the turnover, turning the ball over on downs at the Texas Tech 20-yard line. Texas Tech would quickly march down field in under 1:30 with Mahomes throwing a 23-yard pass to Jonathan Giles for a touchdown to tie the game 23–23. Hatfield would make the point after attempt to give the Red Raiders a 24–23 lead, their first and only lead of the game. Texas Tech would only briefly hold the lead, with Oklahoma scoring in just 20 seconds with a 23-yard touchdown pass from Mayfield to Nick Basquine with 17 seconds left in the quarter. After receiving the kickoff, the Red Raiders took a knee to end the half, trailing the Sooners 24–30.

=== Third quarter ===
Texas Tech received the opening kickoff for the second half, but went three-and-out and had to punt; this would be the last drive of the game to not end in a score until the end of the game. The Sooners scored three touchdowns in the quarter, all of which were passes of over 20 yards, while the Red Raiders scored two, both passes of over 30 yards. Oklahoma led 51–38 at the end of the quarter, with Texas Tech in possession of the ball at the Oklahoma 48-yard line.

=== Fourth quarter ===
Each team scored two touchdowns in the quarter, with Texas Tech scoring first with a 22-yard run from Mahomes. Oklahoma responded on the next drive with a 15-yard pass from Mayfield to Mixon and would convert a two-point conversion with a pass from Mayfield to Westbrook. The Red Raiders responded in just five plays, with a 56-yard pass from Mahomes to Keke Coutee. The next drive ended with a 42-yard touchdown run from Mixon to extend Oklahoma's lead to 66–52. On the ensuing kickoff, Reginald Davis III returned Seibert's kick to the Texas Tech 15-yard line, but a holding penalty pushed the Red Raiders back to their own 8-yard line. Texas Tech went down field in just under 3 1/2 minutes with a 3-yard pass from Mahomes to Cameron Batson with 1:38 left in the game. Trailing 59–66 with just over a minute and a half left in the game, Michael Barden attempted an onside kick for Texas Tech, but it was recovered by Oklahoma. The Sooners ran out the clock to win 66–59.

== Scoring summary ==
Scoring summary

Quarter	Time	Drive			Team	Scoring information	Score	
Quarter	Time	Plays	Yards	TOP	Team	Scoring information	OU	TTU
1	13:23	5	75	1:37	OU	Joe Mixon 56-yard touchdown reception from Baker Mayfield, Austin Seibert kick no good	6	0
1	11:28	3	62	0:44	OU	Dede Westbrook 49-yard touchdown reception from Baker Mayfield, Austin Seibert kick good	13	0
1	7:23	12	84	4:05	TTU	Da'Leon Ward 4-yard touchdown run, Clayton Hatfield kick good	13	7
1	1:06	10	65	2:02	TTU	37-yard field goal by Clayton Hatfield	13	10
2	13:31	1	46	0:42	OU	Joe Mixon 46-yard touchdown run, Austin Seibert kick good	20	10
2	9:06	14	75	4:25	TTU	Patrick Mahomes 11-yard touchdown run, Clayton Hatfield kick good	20	17
2	6:14	9	69	2:52	OU	23-yard field goal by Austin Seibert	23	17
2	0:37	8	80	1:26	TTU	Jonathan Giles 23-yard touchdown reception from Patrick Mahomes, Clayton Hatfield kick good	23	24
2	0:17	2	75	0:20	OU	Nick Basquine 23-yard touchdown reception from Baker Mayfield, Austin Seibert kick good	30	24
3	11:51	6	68	2:17	OU	Dede Westbrook 23-yard touchdown reception from Baker Mayfield, Austin Seibert kick good	37	24
3	9:33	9	75	2:18	TTU	Reginald Davis 32-yard touchdown reception from Patrick Mahomes, Clayton Hatfield kick good	37	31
3	7:59	5	75	1:34	OU	Joe Mixon 43-yard touchdown reception from Baker Mayfield, Austin Seibert kick good	44	31
3	4:10	11	75	3:49	TTU	Jonathan Giles 41-yard touchdown reception from Patrick Mahomes, Clayton Hatfield kick good	44	38
3	1:36	6	76	2:34	OU	Dimitri Flowers 34-yard touchdown reception from Baker Mayfield, Austin Seibert kick good	51	38
4	12:57	12	75	3:39	TTU	Patrick Mahomes 22-yard touchdown run, Clayton Hatfield kick good	51	45
4	9:15	8	75	3:42	OU	Joe Mixon 15-yard touchdown reception from Baker Mayfield, 2-point pass good	59	45
4	7:56	5	77	1:19	TTU	Keke Coutee 56-yard touchdown reception from Patrick Mahomes, Clayton Hatfield kick good	59	52
4	5:03	7	75	2:53	OU	Joe Mixon 42-yard touchdown run, Austin Seibert kick good	66	52
4	1:38	13	92	3:25	TTU	Cameron Batson 3-yard touchdown reception from Patrick Mahomes, Clayton Hatfield kick good	66	59
"TOP" = time of possession. For other American football terms, see Glossary of American football.							66	59

== Analysis ==
Each team had 854 yards of offense. The 4th quarter alone had 400 total yards of offense and 36 points. Texas Tech punted on its first possession of the 3rd quarter, the last drive that did not end in a score until the last drive of the game, when Oklahoma took a knee to end the game. Oklahoma had 545 yards passing and 309 yards rushing, while Texas Tech had 734 yards passing and 120 yards rushing. Oklahoma had no turnovers while Texas Tech had two: a fumble by Jonathan Giles and an interception by Patrick Mahomes. The Sooners had 6 penalties for 60 yards while the Red Raiders had 11 for 92 yards. Texas Tech's 854 yards set the FBS record for most yards in a game by the losing team.

Mahomes accounted for 819 total yards on 100 plays, setting the FBS record for most yards by a player in a single game. The quarterback's 734 passing yards also tied the record for most passing yards in a game. Mahomes's 52 completions set the Big 12 record for most completions in a game, a record previously held by Kliff Kingsbury. Oklahoma became the first team in college football to have a 500-yard passer, a 200-yard rusher, and a 200-yard receiver in the same game.

== Statistics ==
	1	2	3	4	Total
No. 16 Sooners	13	17	21	15	66
Red Raiders	10	14	14	21	59

Statistics	Oklahoma	Texas Tech
First downs	34	42
Total yards	854	854
Rushes–yards	40–309	21–120
Passing yards	545	734
Passing: Comp–Att–Int	27–36–0	52–88–1
Time of possession	29:07	30:53

Team	Category	Player	Statistics
Oklahoma	Passing	Baker Mayfield	27–36, 545 yards, 7 TD
Oklahoma	Rushing	Joe Mixon	31 carries, 263 yards, 2 TD
Oklahoma	Receiving	Dede Westbrook	9 receptions, 202 yards, 2 TD
Texas Tech	Passing	Patrick Mahomes	52–88, 734 yards, 5 TD, INT
Texas Tech	Rushing	Patrick Mahomes	12 carries, 85 yards, 2 TD
Texas Tech	Receiving	Keke Coutee	10 receptions, 172 yards, TD

== Aftermath ==
Oklahoma would finish the rest of the season undefeated, finishing with a record of 11–2 and ending the season with a 35–19 win over Auburn in the Sugar Bowl. Texas Tech would only win two of its remaining games, finishing the season with a record of 5–7 with no bowl game.

== Legacy ==
Both starting quarterbacks, Oklahoma's Baker Mayfield and Texas Tech's Patrick Mahomes, were drafted into the National Football League (NFL). Mahomes was drafted by the Kansas City Chiefs in the 2017 NFL draft, being selected number 10 overall. Mayfield was drafted by the Cleveland Browns in the 2018 NFL draft number 1 overall. The two quarterbacks met for the first time in the NFL on November 4, 2018, with the Chiefs winning 37–21. The two met again in the Divisional Round of the 2020–21 NFL playoffs.
