= Cale Gundy =

American football player and coach (born 1972)

Biographical details
- Born: April 10, 1972 (age 54); Midwest City, Oklahoma, U.S.
- Education: Midwest City (OK)

Playing career
- 1990–1993: Oklahoma
- Position: Quarterback

Coaching career (HC unless noted)
- 1994: Oklahoma (GA)
- 1995: UAB (QB)
- 1996–1998: UAB (RB)
- 1999–2004: Oklahoma (RB)
- 2005–2014: Oklahoma (RB/RC)
- 2015–2016: Oklahoma (AHC/IWR/RC)
- 2017–2021: Oklahoma (OC/IWR/RC)
- 2022: Oklahoma (WR)

Accomplishments and honors

Awards
- First-team All-Big Eight (1993)

Joseph Cale Gundy (born April 10, 1972) is an American former football quarterback who played for the Oklahoma Sooners from 1990 to 1993. While at Oklahoma he was a member of Delta Tau Delta International Fraternity. He also played on the baseball team. From 1999 until his resignation in 2022, he was an assistant at his alma mater, first as running backs coach, and later serving as the team's offensive coordinator, recruiting coordinator, and inside receivers coach. In 2022, he was named coach of the wide receivers unit as a whole.

Gundy resigned his position on the coaching staff in August 2022. He coached/recruited some of the most talented college players, such as Baker Mayfield, Jalen Hurts, Kyler Murray, and Caleb Williams, running backs Joe Mixon, Rodney Anderson, DeMarco Murray, and Adrian Peterson, and wide receivers Kenny Stills, Dede Westbrook, Hollywood Brown, CeeDee Lamb, Sterling Shepard, and Marvin Mims.

== Family ==
His brother, Mike, was head football coach at Oklahoma State University.
