= C. H. Yoe High School =

C.H. Yoe High School
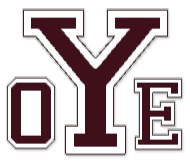

Location
- 303 E. 12th St; Cameron, Texas 76520; United States; 30.8575°N 96.9713°W

Information
- School type: Public high school
- Motto: Together, We, the Yoemen, stand!
- Established: 1921
- Founder: Charles H. Yoe
- School district: Cameron Independent School District
- Superintendent: Kevin Sprinkles
- Principal: Brian Stork
- Staff: 40.41 (on an FTE basis)
- Grades: 9-12
- Enrollment: 475 (2023–2024)
- Student to teacher ratio: 11.75
- Colors: Maroon & Gray
- Song: On Yoe High
- Fight song: Our Boys Will Shine Tonight
- Athletics conference: UIL Class AAA
- Mascot: Yoemen/Lady Yoe
- Rival: Rockdale Tigers
- Yearbook: The Yoeman
- Website: C. H. Yoe High School website

The C.H. Yoe High School is a public high school located in Cameron, Texas (USA). Founded in 1921 in honor of donor Charles Yoe, It is part of the Cameron Independent School District located in north central Milam County and classified as a 3A school by the UIL. The school uses the unusual symbol oYe to pay tribute to the school's namesake, C.H. Yoe, the school's founder. In 2015, the school was rated "Met Standard" by the Texas Education Agency.

The boundary of its school district includes Cameron, Ben Arnold, and a piece of Burlington.

== History ==
The C.H. Yoe High School was built in 1921 in honor of local Cameron businessman and entrepreneur Charles H. Yoe, who donated the money for the school. Yoe wanted to donate the money as he felt that his lack of education had handicapped him and the Yoes had no children to inherit their fortune. Plans for the new school, which was to replace the deteriorating Cameron High School, were started in 1916 but halted after Charles' death in 1917. The building was to cost no less than $50,000 and no more than $125,000. The first classes at The C.H. Yoe School were held on March 9, 1921. The building was considered state-of-the-art for its time. In 2004, after 83 years of use, the original school building was discontinued for service after a new school building was built and opened for the 2004–2005 school year. The new school was built around the old school and gymnasium, and both buildings are still standing.

== Athletics ==
The school's athletic teams compete as Cameron rather than C.H. Yoe.

The Cameron Yoemen/Lady Yoe compete in the following sports -

Cross Country, Volleyball, Football, Basketball, Powerlifting, Soccer, Golf, Tennis, Track & Field, Softball, Baseball, Wrestling

C.H. Yoe High School's principal rival are the Rockdale Tigers, as the schools are about 15 minutes apart, separated by the Little River. The Rockdale Tigers and Cameron Yoemen football teams compete in the "Battle of the Bell" every year for the coveted Victory Bell.

=== State titles ===
- Lone Star Cup -
  - 2010-11 (2A)
- Baseball -
  - 2011 (2A)
- Football -
  - 1981 (3A), 2012 (2A DI), 2013 (2A DI), 2014 (3A DI)
- Girls Track -
  - 2011 (2A)
  - 2021 (3A)
- Powerlifting
  - 2007: Boys 275 lb. class - Luis Marquez
    - squat 700, bench 370, deadlift 600
  - 2013, 2014: Girls 198 lb. class - Jazmine Jones
- Tennis -
  - 1991, 1992, 1993, 1994: Kori Sosnowy (Girls Singles, 3A)

== Band ==
- Marching Band: Bronze 2011
- Marching Band: Silver 2013
- State (2A) Honor Band 2014
- Marching Band: 6th 2015
- Marching Band: 5th 2017
- Marching Band: 6th 2019
- Marching Band: 8th 2021
- Marching Band: 7th 2023

== Theater ==
- One Act Play -
  - 1992(3A)

== Notable alumni ==
- Dede Westbrook, wide receiver for the Minnesota Vikings
- Drayton McLane, former president and CEO of McLane Company and former owner of the Houston Astros
