= Kyler Murray =

American football player (born 1997)

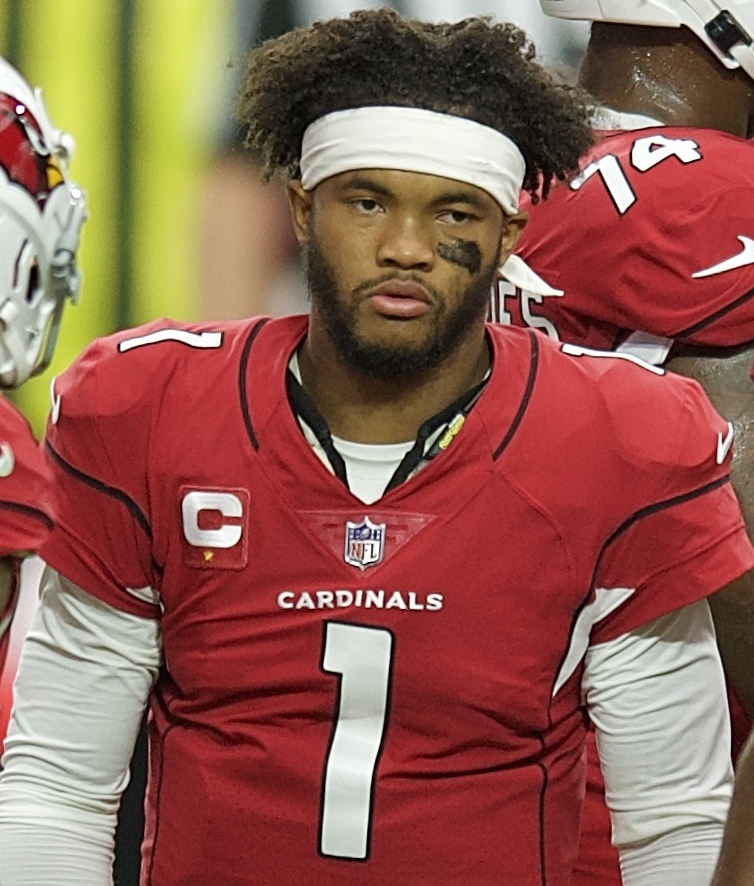
- Murray with the Arizona Cardinals in 2020

No. 1 – Minnesota Vikings
- Position: Quarterback
- Roster status: Active

Personal information
- Born: August 7, 1997 (age 29); Bedford, Texas, U.S.
- Listed height: 5 ft 10 in (1.78 m)
- Listed weight: 207 lb (94 kg)

Career information
- High school: Allen (Allen, Texas)
- College: Texas A&M (2015); Oklahoma (2016–2018)
- NFL draft: 2019: 1st round, 1st overall pick

Career history
- Arizona Cardinals (2019–2025); Minnesota Vikings (2026–present)

Awards and highlights
- 2× Pro Bowl (2020, 2021); NFL Offensive Rookie of the Year (2019); Heisman Trophy (2018)

Career NFL statistics as of Week 10, 2026
- Passing attempts: 3,095
- Passing completions: 2,074
- Completion percentage: 67.0%
- TD–INT: 126–63
- Passing yards: 21,482
- Passer rating: 91.9
- Rushing yards: 3,360
- Rushing touchdowns: 32
- Stats at Pro Football Reference

Kyler Cole Murray (born August 7, 1997) is an American professional football quarterback for the Minnesota Vikings of the National Football League (NFL). Following one season of college football with the Texas A&M Aggies, he played for the Oklahoma Sooners, winning the Heisman Trophy in 2018. Murray was selected first overall by the Arizona Cardinals in the 2019 NFL draft. He was also selected ninth overall by the Oakland Athletics of Major League Baseball (MLB) in the 2018 draft, making him the first player drafted in the first round of both sports.

As a rookie, Murray was named NFL Offensive Rookie of the Year after setting several Cardinals franchise rookie quarterback records. He received consecutive Pro Bowl selections during his next two seasons, along with leading the Cardinals to the playoffs in 2021, their first appearance since 2015. However, Murray's subsequent seasons were marked by injuries and a performance decline, leading to his release and him signing with the Vikings in 2026. Murray ranks fifth all-time in completion percentage with at least 1,500 pass attempts.

== Early life ==
=== High school football ===
Murray was born in Bedford, Texas. He attended Allen High School in Allen. As a senior in 2014, he was the Gatorade Football Player of the Year and became the first player to be named Mr. Texas Football twice. His team won three straight state championships and 43 games in a row. He missed one start during this streak and finished his career with a perfect 42–0 record as a starting quarterback.

Murray was ranked by ESPN, Scout.com, and 247Sports as a five-star recruit and the best dual-threat quarterback in his class. In May 2014, he committed to Texas A&M University to play college football and college baseball. He officially signed with them on February 4, 2015.

=== High school baseball ===
Murray also played baseball and was considered one of the top prospects for the 2015 Major League Baseball draft. In high school, Murray was a shortstop and a second baseman. He was the first player to ever be selected for both the Under Armour All-America Baseball Game and Under Armour All-America Football Game.

== College career ==
=== College football ===
==== Texas A&M ====
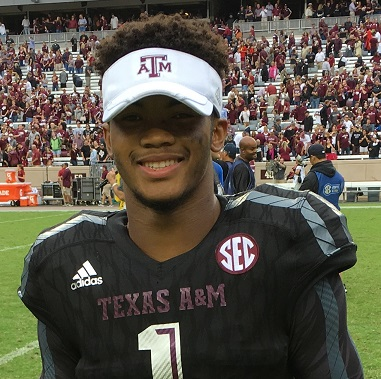
Murray after his first win at Texas A&M, 2015

As a true freshman in 2015, Murray competed with Kyle Allen before the season for the starting quarterback position. Allen won the job, with Murray appearing in games as a backup (primarily on plays involving the wildcat formation). After the team lost two straight games in October, the competition was opened again prior to the South Carolina game, and Murray won the starting quarterback position. In his first start, Murray threw for 223 yards and rushed for 156 yards with a passing touchdown and a rushing touchdown, making him and Cam Newton the only Southeastern Conference quarterbacks in the past 20 years to gain over 100 yards passing and rushing, including a passing touchdown and a rushing touchdown in their first career start. In his second start the next game against Auburn, Murray threw for 105 yards while throwing three interceptions, and rushing for 37 yards in the 26–10 loss. He rebounded from his previous game the next week against Western Carolina, throwing for 191 yards, 3 touchdowns and 2 interceptions, while rushing for 50 yards in the 41–17 blowout win. After the game, Allen was named the starting quarterback and Murray was sidelined for the rest of the season.

==== Oklahoma ====
On December 24, 2015, Murray announced that he was transferring to the University of Oklahoma. Per NCAA transfer rules, he missed the entire 2016 season.

===== 2017 =====
In the 2017 season, Murray was a backup quarterback to Baker Mayfield. He got the opportunity to play in some games in relief of Mayfield. He made his season debut in the season opener against UTEP. In the 56–7 victory, he came into the game in the second half and finished 10-of-11 for 149 yards and a touchdown. Two weeks later, against Tulane, he hit all three pass attempts for 103 yards and a touchdown. On November 25, against West Virginia, he started the game after Mayfield had to sit out some of the game due to disciplinary actions in the previous game against the Kansas Jayhawks. In the game, he hit both pass attempts for 52 total yards and a touchdown while contributing 80 rushing yards on three carries.

===== 2018 =====
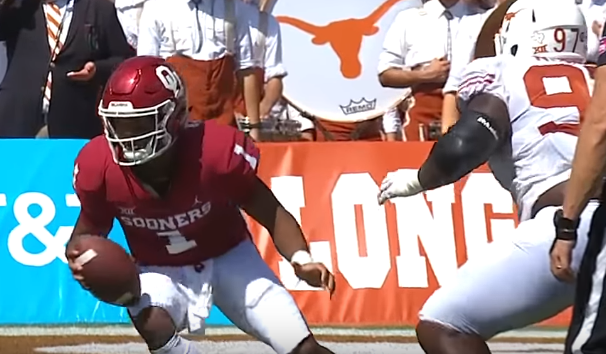
Murray with Oklahoma in 2018

With Mayfield heading to the NFL, Oklahoma considered Murray and Austin Kendall to start at quarterback in 2018. Murray was chosen as the starting quarterback. He threw for more than 4,000 yards and 42 touchdowns in the 2018 regular season, and rushed for over 1,000 yards and 12 rushing touchdowns. In December 2018, Murray won the Heisman Trophy as the best collegiate football player in the country, giving Oklahoma back-to-back Heisman winners. Murray helped lead Oklahoma to a Big 12 Championship win and an appearance in the College Football Playoff. In the 2018 Orange Bowl against Alabama, he threw for 308 passing yards and had two passing touchdowns as the Sooners lost by a score of 45–34. Murray became only the third Heisman Trophy winner to not be awarded consensus All-American honors.

=== College baseball ===
Murray opted out of the MLB draft after deciding to attend Texas A&M. He was initially set to play as an infielder for the Texas A&M Aggies baseball team in the 2016 season until he announced his departure from Texas A&M on December 17, 2015.

Murray played for the Oklahoma Sooners baseball team in 2017 as a left fielder. He had a .122 batting average and six runs batted in (RBIs) in 27 games. After the 2017 season, he played collegiate summer baseball for the Harwich Mariners of the Cape Cod Baseball League. In 2018, playing as a centerfielder, Murray batted .296 with 10 home runs, 47 RBIs, and 10 stolen bases.

Despite Murray's reported intention to continue his football career, the Oakland Athletics selected Murray with the ninth overall selection of the 2018 MLB draft. He signed a contract with the Athletics which included a $4.66 million signing bonus. Prior to his junior year with the football team, Murray said that he would report to spring training in 2019 to begin his professional baseball career. However, following his Heisman Trophy-winning 2018 season, he would forgo his senior year and enter the NFL draft. The A's retain his rights, should he return to baseball.

== Professional career ==
=== Pre-draft ===
In January 2019, Murray announced that he would forgo his senior year and enter the 2019 NFL draft. On February 11, he announced his decision to focus on his football career, forgoing baseball.

Some believed that Murray's pursuit of a football career at the expense of a potential one in baseball was a mistake because of his limited stature relative to a typical NFL quarterback. At the NFL Combine, Murray was not expected to match his listed height of 5 ft 10 in (1.78 m), because colleges often exaggerate measurements to make players more formidable to opposing teams. Murray's final measurements were 5 ft 10 1/8 in (1.78 m) and 207 lb (94 kg), similar to that of then-Seattle Seahawks starting quarterback Russell Wilson.

Despite not taking part in individual drills at the combine, many saw Murray's draft stock improve because of his greater-than-expected measurements, though some football scouts and pundits remain skeptical of the official listing. Compounding things, NFL Network reporter Charley Casserly said that Murray had "the worst report I’ve ever heard on a top-ranked quarterback from the interview part of it", though Murray's agent disputed this account. Gil Brandt also questioned the veracity of Casserly's assertions. Murray was ranked as the best quarterback prospect available by multiple outlets and sports websites.

Pre-draft measurables
Height	Weight	Arm length	Hand span	Wingspan	Wonderlic
5 ft 10 1/8 in (1.78 m)	207 lb (94 kg)	28 1/2 in (0.72 m)	9 1/2 in (0.24 m)	5 ft 9 1/2 in (1.77 m)	20
All values from NFL Combine

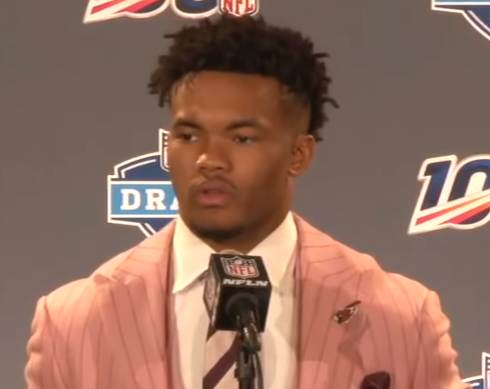
Murray at the 2019 NFL draft

=== Arizona Cardinals ===
==== 2019 ====
Murray was selected first overall by the Arizona Cardinals in the 2019 NFL draft, becoming the shortest quarterback drafted in the first round. When leading Texas Tech's football program, Cardinals head coach Kliff Kingsbury said that he would hypothetically spend the draft's top selection on Murray. The pick made Murray the first player to be drafted in the first round of both the NFL and MLB drafts, the first time that two quarterbacks from the same university have gone in the first round in successive seasons after Baker Mayfield was selected first in the 2018 NFL draft and the first quarterback under 6 feet selected number one in an NFL draft. On May 9, 2019, Murray signed his four-year rookie contract, worth $35.2 million with the Cardinals.

Murray played his first NFL game on September 8, 2019, against the Detroit Lions, finishing with 308 passing yards, two touchdowns, and an interception as the game ended in a 27–27 tie. Murray led the Cardinals to a comeback in the fourth quarter from a 16-point deficit, joining Jake Plummer as the only Cardinals rookie quarterbacks to throw for 300 yards and two touchdowns since the AFL-NFL merger in 1970. During Week 2 against the Baltimore Ravens, Murray finished with 349 passing yards as the Cardinals lost 23–17. In Week 4 against the Seahawks, Murray threw for 241 yards and a pick-six and rushed four times for 27 yards and his first NFL rushing touchdown in the 27–10 loss. In the next game against the Cincinnati Bengals, Murray threw for 253 yards and rushed for 93 yards and a touchdown in the 26–23 victory. During Week 6 against the Atlanta Falcons, Murray threw for 340 yards and three touchdowns and rushed 11 times for 32 yards in a narrow 34–33 victory. He was named the National Football Conference (NFC) Offensive Player of the Week for his performance.

In Week 10, against the Tampa Bay Buccaneers, Murray threw for 324 passing yards, three touchdowns, and one interception in the 30–27 loss. In Week 11 against the San Francisco 49ers, Murray threw for 150 yards and two touchdowns and rushed for 67 yards and a touchdown in the 36–26 loss. In Week 16 against the Seattle Seahawks, Murray threw for 118 yards and a touchdown and rushed for 40 yards before exiting the game due to a hamstring injury. Without Murray, the Cardinals won the game 27–13. Before the regular season finale against the Los Angeles Rams, Murray was listed as a game-time decision with a hamstring injury and ultimately played in the game despite being hurt. During the game, Murray threw for 325 yards, two touchdowns, and two interceptions during the 31–24 loss. Afterwards, Cardinals' head coach Kliff Kingsbury said that "It's the most proud I've been of him all season."

Murray finished his rookie season with 3,722 passing yards, 20 passing touchdowns, and 12 interceptions to go along with 544 rushing yards and four rushing touchdowns on 93 carries and was named a Pro Bowl Alternate. He was named to the PFWA All-Rookie Team. At the NFL Honors on February 1, Murray won the AP NFL Offensive Rookie of the Year award for his performance during the season. He was ranked 90th by his fellow players on the NFL Top 100 Players of 2020.

==== 2020 ====
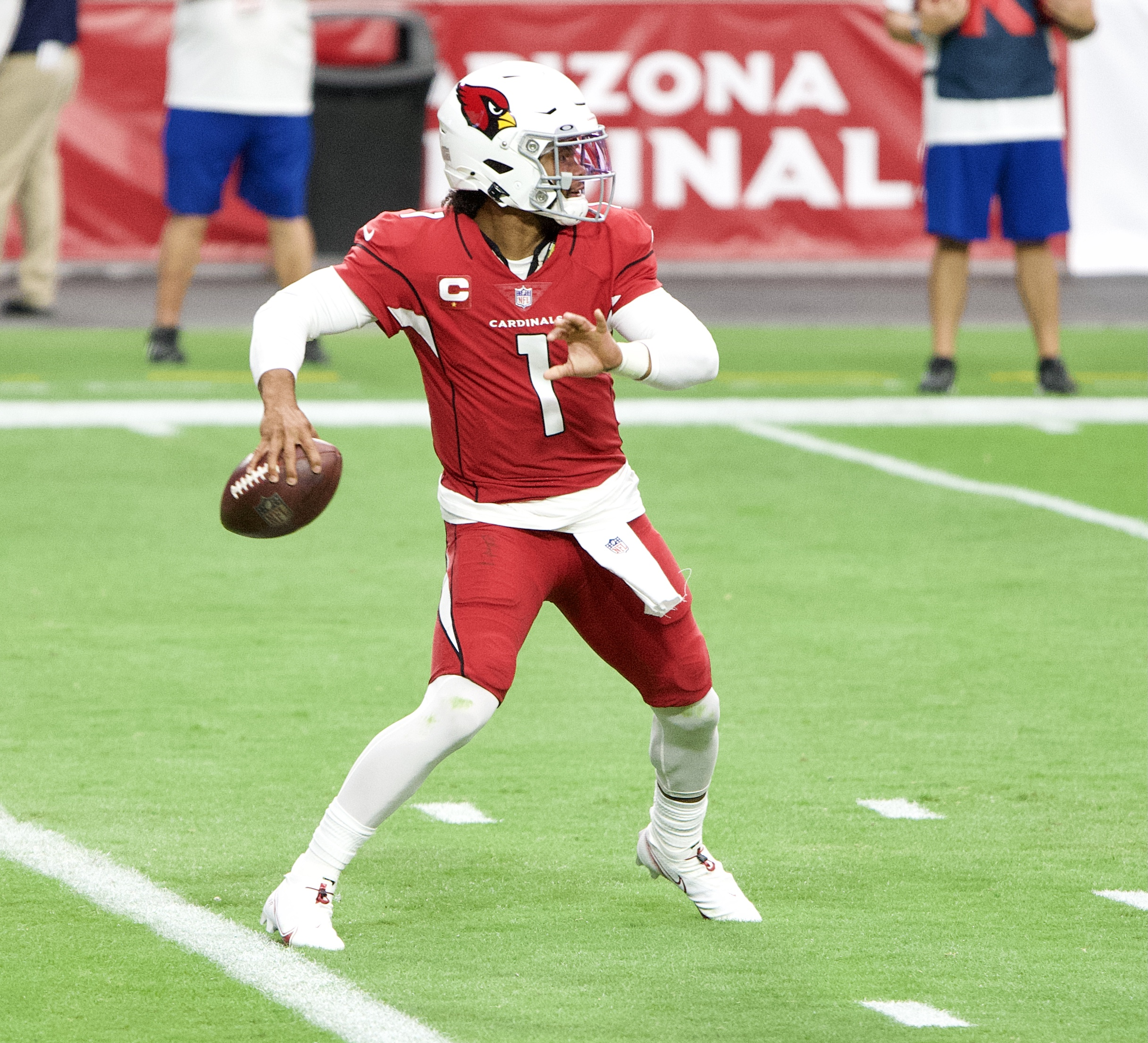
Murray with the Arizona Cardinals in 2020

In Week 1 against the 49ers, Murray finished with 230 passing yards, one passing touchdown, and an interception to go along with 91 rushing yards and a rushing touchdown in the 24–20 win. In Week 2 against the Washington Football Team, Murray passed for 286 yards, one passing touchdown, and one interception to go along with eight carries for 67 rushing yards and two rushing touchdowns in the 30–15 victory. During Week 5 against the New York Jets, Murray finished with 380 passing yards, 31 rushing yards, two total touchdowns, and one interception as the Cardinals won 30–10.

On October 14, 2020, Murray was named the NFC Offensive Player of the Week for his performance in Week 5. In Week 7 against the Seahawks on Sunday Night Football, Murray completed 34 of 48 passes for 360 yards, three touchdowns, and an interception plus ran 14 times for 67 yards and scored a rushing touchdown as the Cardinals beat the previously undefeated Seahawks 37–34 in overtime. Murray was also named NFC Offensive Player of the Week for his performance in Week 7. In Week 9, against the Miami Dolphins, he had 283 passing yards, three passing touchdowns, 106 rushing yards, and one rushing touchdown in the 34–31 loss.

In Week 10 against the Buffalo Bills, Murray passed for 245 yards, one passing touchdown, and one interception to go along with 11 carries for 61 rushing yards and two rushing touchdowns. He helped the Cardinals mount a comeback win in the final seconds; down 26–30, the Cardinals drove down to the Buffalo 43-yard line with 11 seconds to go before Murray scrambled out of the pocket and connected with DeAndre Hopkins, who was surrounded by three Bills defenders, on a Hail Mary pass. The resulting touchdown, dubbed the "Hail Murray", allowed Arizona to win 32–30 and take the division lead in the NFC West. In Week 15 against the Philadelphia Eagles, Murray threw for 406 yards, three touchdowns, and one interception, and rushed for 29 yards and another touchdown during the 33–26 win. Murray's performance in Week 15 earned him the NFC Offensive Player of the Week award, his third of the season.

Murray finished the 2020 season with 3,971 passing yards, 26 passing touchdowns, and 12 interceptions to go along with 133 carries for 819 rushing yards and 11 rushing touchdowns. Murray was named to the Pro Bowl for the first time in his career, and although the physical event was canceled due to the Covid-19 pandemic, an exhibition game was held online by means of the Madden 21 video game. Murray participated as one of 4 players representing the NFC, and won the match, earning Madden NFL 21 Pro Bowl MVP. He was ranked 39th by his fellow players on the NFL Top 100 Players of 2021.

==== 2021 ====
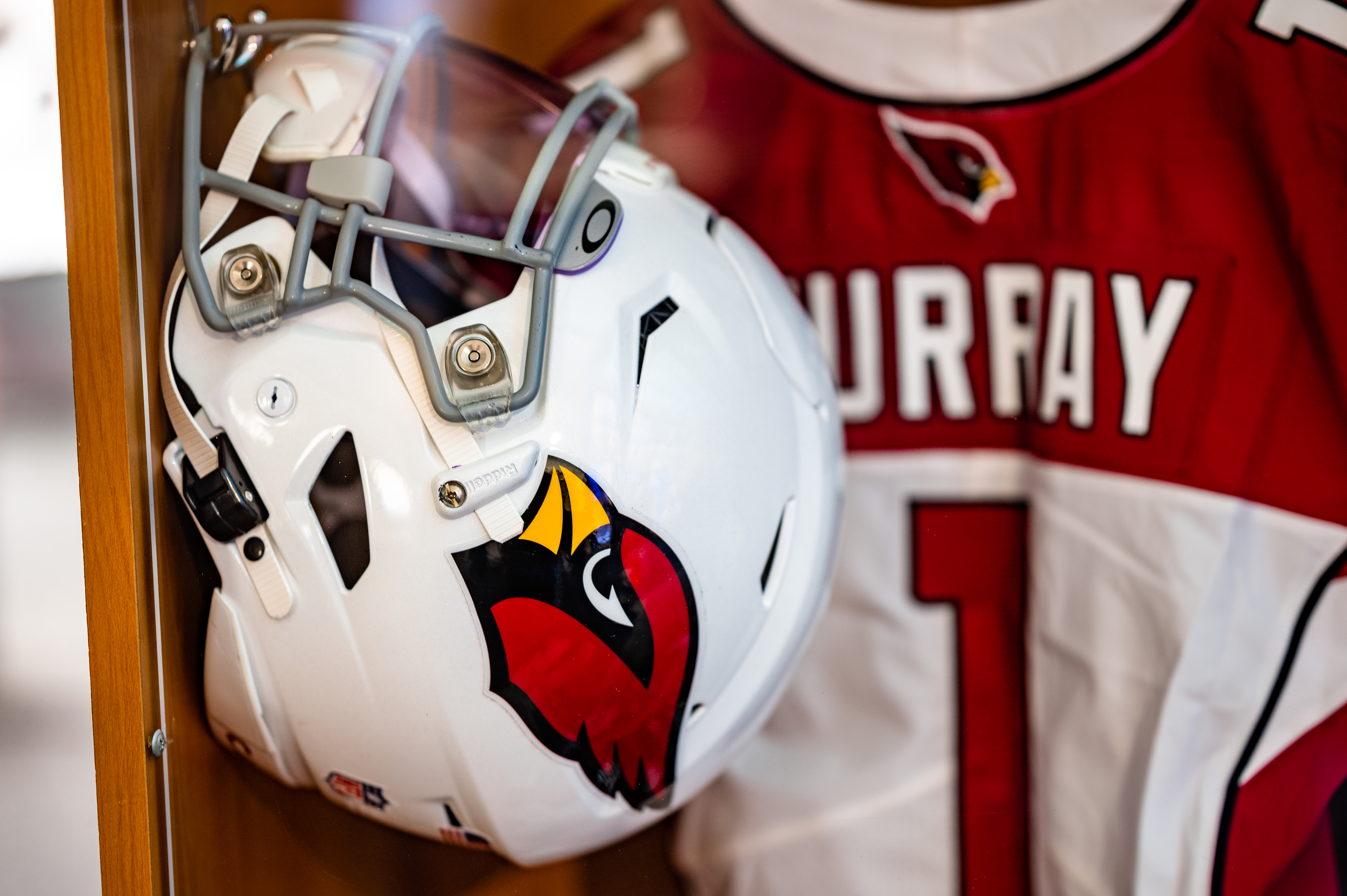
Murray's helmet and jersey in his locker at State Farm Stadium in 2021

In Week 1 against the Tennessee Titans, Murray threw for 289 yards, four passing touchdowns, and one interception to go along with 20 rushing yards and a rushing touchdown as the Cardinals won 38–13. In Week 2 against the Minnesota Vikings, Murray finished with 400 passing yards, 31 rushing yards, two interceptions, and four total touchdowns as the Cardinals narrowly won 34–33 due to the Vikings missing a field goal with three seconds left in the fourth quarter. He was named NFC Offensive Player of the Week for his Week 2 performance. In Week 4 against the arch rival Rams, Murray passed for 268 yards and two passing touchdowns, winning 37–20 as the Cardinals snapped an 8-game losing streak against the Rams, beating them for the first time since 2016. In Week 6 against the Cleveland Browns, Murray threw for 229 yards and four passing touchdowns as the Cardinals won 37–14, improving to a league-best record of 6–0. The win also improved Murray's record to 2–0 against former college teammate Baker Mayfield, having previously beaten Mayfield and the Browns in Week 6 of 2019.

Prior to Week 8, Murray had led the Cardinals to the best record in the NFL at 7–0 before getting injured in the final minute of the Thursday Night Football loss against the Green Bay Packers. It was later reported that he suffered an ankle injury and ended up missing three weeks before returning in Week 13 against the Chicago Bears. In his first game back, Murray had 123 passing yards, 59 rushing yards, and four total touchdowns in the 33–22 win. In Week 14 against the Los Angeles Rams on Monday Night Football, Murray threw for 383 yards and two interceptions as the Cardinals lost 30–23. On Christmas Day against the Indianapolis Colts, Murray threw for 245 yards and a passing touchdown and rushed for 74 yards, including a career-long 57-yard run. However, the Cardinals missed two field goals and an extra-point, narrowly losing 22–16 and dropping their third consecutive game, having previously lost to the Lions in Week 15.

In Week 17 against the Dallas Cowboys, Murray and the Cardinals bounced back, beating the Cowboys 25–22, with Murray throwing for 263 yards and two touchdowns. Coming into Week 18, the Cardinals were one game back of the Los Angeles Rams in the NFC West standings, needing a Rams loss and a Cardinals win in order to overtake them. In the season finale against the Seahawks, Murray passed for 240 yards and one touchdown to go with 35 rushing yards. Despite this, the Cardinals lost 38–30, eliminating them from potentially winning the NFC West for the first time since 2015, as the Rams had lost earlier that day to the 49ers.

Murray finished the 2021 regular season with 3,787 passing yards, 24 passing touchdowns, and 10 interceptions to go along with 88 carries for 423 rushing yards and 5 rushing touchdowns in 14 games played. Murray also made the Pro Bowl for a second straight season.

On January 17, 2022, Murray made his NFL postseason debut in the Wild Card Round, losing to the Rams 34–11. Murray struggled throughout the game, throwing for just 137 yards, two interceptions, and zero touchdowns, as well as setting a career low in passer rating (40.9). He was ranked 57th by his fellow players on the NFL Top 100 Players of 2022.

==== 2022 ====
The Cardinals picked up the fifth-year option on Murray's contract on April 27, 2022. On July 21, 2022, Murray signed a five-year, $230.5 million contract extension to stay with the Cardinals, with $160 million being guaranteed.

In the season opener against the Kansas City Chiefs, Murray threw for 193 yards, two touchdowns, and 29 rushing yards. However, the Cardinals defense gave up 44 points, allowing the Chiefs to score touchdowns on their first three drives as the Cardinals dropped their sixth consecutive home game, losing 44–21. In Week 2 against the Las Vegas Raiders, Murray and the Cardinals were shutout in the first half, with Murray throwing an interception as the Cardinals trailed 20–0 at halftime. However, Murray erupted in the second half, throwing for 277 yards and a touchdown plus a rushing two-point conversion, along with scoring a rushing touchdown and throwing for a second two-point conversion to tie with 0:00 left in regulation. The Cardinals would go on to win 29–23 in overtime.

In Week 4 against the Carolina Panthers, Murray threw for 207 yards with two touchdowns and an interception to go along with a rushing touchdown as the Cardinals won 26–16. The win also improved Murray's record over former college teammate Baker Mayfield to 3–0. In Week 7 against the New Orleans Saints on Thursday Night Football, Murray threw for 204 yards and a touchdown on 20-of-29 passing as the Cardinals won 42–34, snapping an eight-game losing streak at home. In Week 8 against the Vikings, Murray scored his 100th career touchdown, becoming the 12th fastest player to reach that milestone.

In Week 14 against the New England Patriots on Monday Night Football, Murray suffered a non-contact knee injury in the first quarter. He was carted off the field and did not return. The next day, an MRI revealed that Murray tore his ACL, ending his season. He was placed on injured reserve on December 14, 2022. Murray finished the season with 2,368 passing yards, 14 passing touchdowns, and 7 interceptions to go along with 88 carries for 418 rushing yards and 3 rushing touchdowns in 11 games played.

==== 2023 ====
Murray began the season with a new head coach, as Jonathan Gannon replaced Kingsbury following a 4–13 record the previous season. Murray started the 2023 season on the reserve/physically unable to perform (PUP) list. On October 18, Murray was designated to return from the PUP list. He was activated to the 53-man roster on November 7.

After missing the first nine games of the season, Murray made his season debut against the Falcons on November 12. In his first game in 11 months, he threw for 249 yards, an interception, 33 rushing yards, and a rushing touchdown. He also led the Cardinals on a 11-play, 70-yard drive that ended with a walk-off 23-yard field goal to win 25–23. Against the Houston Texans in Week 12, Murray completed 20-of-30 passes for 214 yards, a touchdown, and one interception. He also ran 51 yards and a rushing touchdown as the Cardinals lost 21–16. On the road against the Steelers in Week 13, Murray completed 13-of-23 passes for 145 yards and a touchdown in a 24–10 victory. In Week 17 against the Eagles, Murray rallied the Cardinals from a 15-point halftime deficit to win 35–31, with Murray throwing three touchdown passes in the second half. In the season finale against the Seahawks, Murray led the offense to a season-high 466 yards and finished with a season-best 262 passing yards, but lost 21–20 following two missed field goals late in the fourth quarter.

In the nine games without Murray, the Cardinals' offense ranked 26th, averaging 16.8 points, 289.7 yards per game, and a 1–8 record. In eight games with Murray, the offense averaged 22.4 points, 362.8 yards per game, and was ranked ninth in the league. Despite the identical record from the previous season, Murray expressed that "It's a complete 180" compared to last season and attributed the team's positive cultural shift to the belief and accountability instilled by first-year coach Jonathan Gannon and general manager Monti Ossenfort, stating, "Just to have guys upstairs that believe in it – really speak to it and hold everybody accountable."

==== 2024 ====
In Week 2 against the Rams, Murray completed 17-of-21 passes for 266 yards and three touchdowns, earning a perfect passer rating as the Cardinals won 41–10. He became the second player in NFL history, and the first since 1974, to achieve a perfect rating with 250+ passing yards and 50+ rushing yards. After back-to-back losses at home, Murray and the Cardinals rebounded, winning three of their next four, with Murray leading a game-winning drive in all three wins and placing the Cardinals atop the Division after Week 8. In Week 10, Murray went 22 for 24 for 266 yards and three total touchdowns in a 31–6 win over the New York Jets, earning NFC Offensive Player of the Week. He finished the season with 3,851 passing yards, 21 passing touchdowns, and 11 interceptions to go with 78 carries for 572 rushing yards and five rushing touchdowns. Murray and the Cardinals finished with an 8–9 record and missed the postseason.

==== 2025 ====
In Week 5 against the Tennessee Titans, Murray suffered a foot injury. He remained in the game, where he went 22 for 31 for 220 yards, but the Cardinals lost 22–21. Murray was ruled out for the next three games. On November 5, 2025, Murray was placed on injured reserve, ruling him out until December. On December 5, it was announced that Murray would miss the remainder of the season.

On March 11, 2026, Murray was released by the Cardinals after seven seasons. Murray finished his Cardinals tenure ranking third in franchise history in passing yards (20,460) and touchdowns (121), and second in completions (1,974).

=== Minnesota Vikings ===
On March 12, 2026, Murray signed a one-year contract with the Minnesota Vikings, worth the veteran's minimum salary, $1.3 million. On August 11, it was announced that Murray would be the Vikings' starting quarterback for the 2026 season over J. J. McCarthy. During his Vikings debut against the Green Bay Packers, he suffered a concussion after taking a late hit and was removed from the game for further evaluation.

== Career statistics ==
Legend
	Led the league
**Bold**	Career high

=== NFL ===
==== Regular season ====
Year	Team	Games			Passing									Rushing					Sacked		Fumbles	
Year	Team	GP	GS	Record	Cmp	Att	Pct	Yds	Y/A	Lng	TD	Int	Rtg	Att	Yds	Y/A	Lng	TD	Sck	SckY	Fum	Lost
2019	ARI	16	16	5–10–1	349	542	64.4	3,722	6.9	**88**	20	**12**	87.4	93	544	5.8	35	4	**48**	**309**	5	2
2020	ARI	16	16	8–8	**375**	**558**	67.2	**3,971**	7.1	80	**26**	**12**	94.3	**133**	**819**	6.2	48	**11**	27	176	9	**4**
2021	ARI	14	14	**9–5**	333	481	**69.2**	3,787	**7.9**	77	24	10	**100.6**	88	423	4.8	**57**	5	31	286	**13**	0
2022	ARI	11	11	3–8	259	390	66.4	2,368	6.1	38	14	7	87.2	67	418	6.2	42	3	25	192	8	2
2023	ARI	8	8	3–5	176	268	65.7	1,799	6.7	48	10	5	89.4	44	244	5.5	33	3	18	119	7	0
2024	ARI	17	17	8–9	372	541	68.8	3,851	7.1	60	21	11	93.5	78	572	**7.3**	50	5	30	220	8	**4**
2025	ARI	5	5	2–3	110	161	68.3	962	6.0	45	6	3	88.6	29	173	6.0	30	1	16	111	1	0
2026	MIN	6	6	5–1	100	154	64.9	1,022	6.6	51	5	3	86.6	29	167	5.8	35	0	15	104	0	0
Career		93	93	43–49–1	2,074	3,095	67.0	21,482	6.9	88	126	63	91.9	561	3,360	6.0	57	32	210	1,517	51	12

==== Postseason ====
Year	Team	Games			Passing									Rushing					Sacked		Fumbles	
Year	Team	GP	GS	Record	Cmp	Att	Pct	Yds	Y/A	Lng	TD	Int	Rtg	Att	Yds	Y/A	Lng	TD	Sck	SckY	Fum	Lost
2021	ARI	1	1	0–1	19	34	55.9	137	4.0	23	0	2	40.9	2	6	3.0	7	0	2	15	0	0
Career		1	1	0–1	19	34	55.9	137	4.0	23	0	2	40.9	2	6	3.0	7	0	2	15	0	0

=== College ===
Season	Team	Games			Passing								Rushing			
Season	Team	GP	GS	Record	Cmp	Att	Pct	Yds	Avg	TD	Int	Rtg	Att	Yds	Avg	TD
2015	Texas A&M	8	3	2–1	72	121	59.5	686	5.7	5	**7**	109.2	53	335	6.3	1
2016	Oklahoma	Did not play due to NCAA transfer rules														
2017	Oklahoma	7	1	1–0	18	21	**85.7**	359	**17.1**	3	0	**276.5**	14	142	**10.1**	0
2018	Oklahoma	14	13	**11–2**	**260**	**377**	69.0	**4,361**	11.6	**42**	**7**	199.2	**140**	**1,001**	7.2	**12**
Career		29	17	14–3	350	519	67.4	5,406	10.4	50	14	181.3	207	1,478	7.1	13

=== High school ===
Season	Passing						Rushing			
Season	Cmp	Att	Pct	Yds	TD	Int	Att	Yds	Avg	TD
2012	153	249	61.4	2,004	17	5	**188**	1,370	7.3	**25**
2013	207	325	63.7	3,669	46	**9**	151	1,274	8.4	19
2014	**278**	**433**	**64.2**	**4,713**	**54**	8	151	**1,495**	**9.9**	**25**
Total	638	1,007	63.4	10,386	117	22	490	4,139	8.4	69

== Career highlights ==
=== Awards and honors ===
NFL

- NFL Offensive Rookie of the Year (2019)
- 2× Pro Bowl (2020, 2021)
- Pro Bowl MVP (2020)
- PFWA All-Rookie Team (2019)
- NFL Moment of the Year (2020)
- Ranked No. 90 in the Top 100 Players of 2020
- Ranked No. 39 in the Top 100 Players of 2021

College

- Heisman Trophy (2018)
- Davey O'Brien Award (2018)
- Manning Award (2018)
- Earl Campbell Tyler Rose Award (2018)
- AP College Football Player of the Year (2018)
- First-team All-American (2018)
- Big 12 Offensive Player of the Year (2018)
- First-team All-Big 12 (2018)

=== Cardinals franchise records ===
- Most games started by a rookie quarterback – 16
- Most pass completions by a rookie – 349
- Most pass attempts by a rookie – 542
- Highest completion percentage by a rookie (at least 2 completions) – 64.4%
- Most passing yards by a rookie – 3,722
- Most passing touchdowns by a rookie – 20
- Highest passer rating by a starting rookie – 87.4
- Most yards per game by a rookie – 232.6
- Most wins by a rookie quarterback – 5
- Most rushing yards by a rookie quarterback – 544
- Most rushing touchdowns by a rookie quarterback – 4
- Most rushing yards per game by a rookie quarterback – 34.0
- Lowest interception percentage in a career – 2.0%
- Highest completion percentage in a career – 67.1%
- Most rushing yards by a quarterback in a career – 3,193
- Most rushing touchdowns by a quarterback in a career – 32

== Personal life ==
Murray's maternal grandmother is a South Korean national. Murray is a Christian. Murray's father, Kevin Murray, was a quarterback at Texas A&M from 1983 to 1986. His uncle, University of Texas alumnus Calvin Murray, was a professional baseball player for the San Francisco Giants, Texas Rangers, and Chicago Cubs. His cousin, Devin Duvernay, is a University of Texas alumnus and is a wide receiver for the Arizona Cardinals.

Despite being a Texas native, Murray grew up a Minnesota Vikings fan, and avoided supporting the Dallas Cowboys, stating "They were always ass".

Murray is an avid chess player, and he has said it has helped him become a better football player. As a child, he won school tournaments. Murray is a three-time participant in the Chess.com BlitzChamps chess tournaments and has appeared in the grand final match of the event twice. Murray lost in the grand final match both times to Justin Reid.

Murray is also an avid video-gamer and in April 2021, he signed with FaZe Clan. In October 2024, Murray announced that he was partnering with Call of Duty to promote the franchise’s latest installment Call of Duty: Black Ops 6.

== See also ==
- Hail Murray – 2020 Hail Mary play in American football
- List of Oklahoma Sooners football statistical leaders
- List of Oklahoma Sooners starting quarterbacks
