= Dede Westbrook =

American football player (born 1993)

No. 12
- Positions: Wide receiver, Return specialist

Personal information
- Born: November 21, 1993 (age 32); Cameron, Texas, U.S.
- Listed height: 6 ft 0 in (1.83 m)
- Listed weight: 178 lb (81 kg)

Career information
- High school: C. H. Yoe (Cameron)
- College: Blinn (2012–2014); Oklahoma (2015–2016)
- NFL draft: 2017: 4th round, 110th overall pick

Career history
- Jacksonville Jaguars (2017–2020); Minnesota Vikings (2021); Green Bay Packers (2022)*
- * Offseason or practice squad member only

Awards and highlights
- Fred Biletnikoff Award (2016); Unanimous All-American (2016); Big 12 Offensive Player of the Year (2016); Big 12 Offensive Newcomer of the Year (2015); First-team All-Big 12 (2016)

Career NFL statistics
- Receptions: 170
- Receiving yards: 1,788
- Return yards: 770
- Rushing yards: 125
- Total touchdowns: 10
- Stats at Pro Football Reference

Decrick De'Shawn "Dede" Westbrook (/ˈdiːd/; born November 21, 1993) is an American former professional football player who was a wide receiver and return specialist in the National Football League (NFL). He played college football for the Oklahoma Sooners, winning the Biletnikoff Award in 2016. He was selected 110th overall in the 2017 NFL draft by the Jacksonville Jaguars, where he played until 2020. He also played for the Minnesota Vikings in 2021.

== Early life ==
Westbrook attended C. H. Yoe High School in Cameron, Texas, where he played high school football for the Yoemen. As a three-year letterer and starter, Westbrook caught a career total of 116 passes for 1,670 yards and 25 touchdowns. He also started at defensive back, racking 77 career tackles, 2 sacks, and 3 interceptions throughout his career. Although originally a highly touted recruit, Westbrook suffered a season-ending injury early into his senior year when a bad tackle ruptured his lower intestine. He spent over a month recovering in a hospital bed and several more months recovering through therapy, which took a toll on his physical and mental health. Many recruiters withdrew their interest when his weight and grades both started to plummet. Many believed Dede's football career was permanently over.

Dede was regarded as a three-star recruit and was ranked the No. 97 wide receiver prospect in the Class of 2012 by ESPN. After getting scholarship offers from Oklahoma State, Texas Tech, UTEP, Utah State, and Wyoming, Dede committed to Texas State University to play for the Texas State Bobcats. However, Dede's grades were still not good enough to allow him to be admitted into the school, so he ultimately went the junior college route and played at Blinn College.

While in high school, Dede excelled in basketball and track.

== College career ==
After fully recovering from his injury, Westbrook had a breakout season at Blinn College where he caught passes for 1,471 yards and 13 touchdowns. Dede was named one of the top junior college recruits and received over 30 scholarship offers, including from some who rescinded their offers when he was injured in high school. He ultimately transferred to the University of Oklahoma to play under head coach Bob Stoops. In his first year at Oklahoma in 2015, he started all 13 games and had 46 receptions for 743 yards and four touchdowns. Westbrook became Oklahoma's number one wide receiver during his senior year in 2016. Against Texas, he set a school record with 232 receiving yards in a single game, breaking the previous record of 217 held by Ryan Broyles. He led the Big 12 Conference with 1,524 receiving yards and 17 receiving touchdowns in 2016.

On December 5, 2016, Westbrook was announced as one of the finalists for the 2016 Heisman Trophy, along with quarterbacks Deshaun Watson, Lamar Jackson, Baker Mayfield, and defensive back Jabrill Peppers, from Clemson, Louisville, Oklahoma, and Michigan, respectively. He ended up finishing in fourth place in the Heisman Trophy voting behind Mayfield (3rd), Watson (2nd), and Jackson (1st).

=== College statistics ===
Season	Team	GP	Receiving		
Season	Team	GP	Rec	Yds	TD
2015	Oklahoma	13	46	743	4
2016	Oklahoma	13	80	1,524	17
Totals		26	126	2,208	21

== Professional career ==
=== Pre-draft ===
Westbrook declined an invitation to play in the Senior Bowl. He received an invitation to the NFL Scouting Combine, but decided to not perform any drills. At Oklahoma's Pro Day, he elected to run all the required combine drills. After finally performing for scouts and team representatives, Westbrook draft projections varied from the second round to the fourth round from draft experts and analysts. He was ranked the third best wide receiver by Pro Football Focus, the 14th best by Sports Illustrated, and was ranked the 15th best by NFLDraftScout.com.

Pre-draft measurables
Height	Weight	Arm length	Hand span	40-yard dash	10-yard split	20-yard split	20-yard shuttle	Three-cone drill	Vertical jump	Broad jump	Bench press
5 ft 11 7/8 in (1.83 m)	178 lb (81 kg)	30 5/8 in (0.78 m)	9 in (0.23 m)	4.39 s	1.54 s	2.54 s	4.34 s	7.24 s	34.5 in (0.88 m)	10 ft 0 in (3.05 m)	8 reps
All values from Oklahoma's Pro Day

=== Jacksonville Jaguars ===
==== 2017 season ====
The Jacksonville Jaguars selected Westbrook in the fourth round (110th overall) of the 2017 NFL draft. He was the 15th wide receiver selected in 2017. On May 16, 2017, the Jaguars signed Westbrook to a four-year, $3.07 million contract with a signing bonus of $676,156. He was placed on injured list with a designation to return on September 8, after dealing with a core muscle injury. On November 18, he was activated off injured reserve. Overall, in his rookie season, he totaled 27 receptions for 339 yards and one touchdown.

The Jaguars made the 2017 NFL playoffs as the #3-seed in the American Football Conference (AFC). In the Wild Card Round, they defeated the Buffalo Bills, 10–3. In his first career postseason game, Westbrook caught five passes for 48 yards on eight targets, which included a 20-yard reception in the beginning of the third quarter. He was the game's leading receiver. In the Divisional Round against the Pittsburgh Steelers, he had an eight-yard reception in the 45–42 victory. In the AFC Championship loss to the New England Patriots, he had a 24-yard reception.

==== 2018 season ====
In Week 2 against the Patriots, Westbrook recorded a 61-yard touchdown reception in the 31–20 victory. In Week 4, in a victory over the New York Jets, he had a career-high nine receptions for 130 receiving yards in the 31–12 victory. In Week 15, against the Washington Redskins, he recorded a 74-yard punt return touchdown in the 16–13 loss. Overall, he finished the 2018 season with 66 receptions for 717 receiving yards and five receiving touchdowns. He led the Jaguars in receptions, yards, and touchdowns in 2018.

==== 2019 season ====
In Week 7, a 27–17 victory over the Cincinnati Bengals, he had six receptions for 103 receiving yards. Overall, he finished the season with 66 receptions for 660 receiving yards and three receiving touchdowns.

==== 2020 season ====
Westbrook entered 2020 fourth on the Jaguars wide receiver depth chart. In Week 7, he suffered a torn ACL and was placed on injured reserve on October 26.

=== Minnesota Vikings ===
On July 26, 2021, Westbrook signed with the Minnesota Vikings on a one-year contract. In the 2021 season, Westbrook appeared in 15 games and recorded ten receptions for 68 receiving yards to go along with some punt return duties.

On October 25, 2022, the Miami Dolphins hosted Westbrook for a workout. Four days later, the Bengals also hosted Westbrook for a workout.

=== Green Bay Packers ===
On November 15, 2022, Westbrook signed to the practice squad of the Green Bay Packers. He was released by the Packers on December 13.

== NFL career statistics ==
Year	Team	Games		Receiving				
Year	Team	GP	GS	Rec	Yds	Avg	Lng	TD
2017	JAX	7	5	27	339	12.1	29	1
2018	JAX	15	8	63	717	11.2	61T	5
2019	JAX	15	11	66	660	10.0	39	3
2020	JAX	2	0	1	4	4.0	4	0
2021	MIN	15	0	10	68	6.8	17	0
Career		55	24	170	1,788	10.5	61T	9
