= 2000 Oklahoma Sooners football team =

American college football season

2000 Oklahoma Sooners football

Consensus national champion Big 12 champion Big 12 South Division champion Orange Bowl champion

Big 12 Championship Game, W 27–24 vs. Kansas State

Orange Bowl (BCS NCG), W 13–2 vs. Florida State
- Conference: Big 12 Conference
- South Division

Ranking
- Coaches: No. 1
- AP: No. 1
- Record: 13–0 (8–0 Big 12)
- Head coach: Bob Stoops (2nd season)
- Offensive coordinator: Mark Mangino (1st season)
- Offensive scheme: Spread
- Co-defensive coordinators: Mike Stoops (2nd season); Brent Venables (2nd season)
- Base defense: 4–3
- Captains: Stephen Burcham; Rocky Calmus; Chris Hammons; Josh Heupel; Seth Littrell; Torrance Marshall
- Home stadium: Oklahoma Memorial Stadium

2000 Big 12 Conference football standings
	Conf.			Overall
Team	W		L	W		L
North Division
No. 9 Kansas State xy	6	–	2	11	–	3
No. 8 Nebraska x	6	–	2	10	–	2
No. 25 Iowa State	5	–	3	9	–	3
Colorado	3	–	5	3	–	8
Kansas	2	–	6	4	–	7
Missouri	2	–	6	3	–	8
South Division
No. 1 Oklahoma x$#	8	–	0	13	–	0
No. 12 Texas	7	–	1	9	–	3
Texas A&M	5	–	3	7	–	5
Texas Tech	3	–	5	7	–	6
Oklahoma State	1	–	7	3	–	8
Baylor	0	–	8	2	–	9
Championship: Oklahoma 27, Kansas State 24
# – BCS National Champion; $ – BCS representative as conference champion; x – Division champion/co-champions; y – Championship game participant; Rankings from AP Poll

The 2000 Oklahoma Sooners football team represented the University of Oklahoma in the 2000 NCAA Division I-A football season, the 106th season of Sooner football. The team was led by Bob Stoops in his second season as head coach. They played their home games at Oklahoma Memorial Stadium in Norman. During this season, they competed in the Big 12 Conference.

The Sooners opened the season ranked #19, the first time they had made it into a pre-season poll in five years.

After four early-season victories against unranked foes, Oklahoma had risen to #10 in the country.

Beginning at the end of September, OU defeated #11 Texas (63–14), #2 Kansas State (41–31), and #1 Nebraska (31–14). By that point, the Sooners had risen to #1 in the polls, a position they retained through the rest of the season.

The 2000 team claimed OU’s first Big 12 title and its 37th conference title overall by beating Kansas State in the Big 12 conference championship game.

The Sooners were invited to the 2001 Orange Bowl, which served as the BCS National Championship Game that year, where they beat the defending national champion Florida State Seminoles by a score of 13–2. The Sooners finished the season 13-0, claiming Oklahoma's seventh national championship in football and first since 1985.

Three OU players were named consensus All Americans after the 2000 season: linebacker Rocky Calmus, quarterback Josh Heupel, and free safety J. T. Thatcher.

== Recruits ==
College recruiting
Name	Hometown	School	Height	Weight	Commit date
Gayron Allen; LB	Orange, Texas	West Orange Stark HS	5 ft 10 in (1.78 m)	195 lb (88 kg)	Dec 5, 1999
Gayron Allen; LB	Recruit ratings: No ratings found				
Jammal Brown; DT	Lawton, Oklahoma	MacArthur HS	6 ft 6 in (1.98 m)	310 lb (140 kg)	Jan 26, 2000
Jammal Brown; DT	Recruit ratings: No ratings found				
Marcus Chretien; DE	Houston, Texas	Kilgore College	6 ft 4 in (1.93 m)	240 lb (110 kg)	Dec 12, 1999
Marcus Chretien; DE	Recruit ratings: No ratings found				
Mark Clayton; WR	Arlington, Texas	Sam Houston HS	5 ft 11 in (1.80 m)	170 lb (77 kg)	Jan 9, 2000
Mark Clayton; WR	Recruit ratings: No ratings found				
Dan Cody; TE	Ada, Oklahoma	Ada HS	6 ft 4 in (1.93 m)	230 lb (100 kg)	Sep 22, 1999
Dan Cody; TE	Recruit ratings: No ratings found				
Lance Donley; TE	Weatherford, Oklahoma	Weatherford HS	6 ft 4 in (1.93 m)	225 lb (102 kg)	Nov 4, 1999
Lance Donley; TE	Recruit ratings: No ratings found				
Howard Duncan; OL	Kansas City, Kansas	Butler CC	6 ft 4 in (1.93 m)	300 lb (140 kg)	Dec 15, 1999
Howard Duncan; OL	Recruit ratings: No ratings found				
Charles Dupree; LE	Oklahoma City, Oklahoma	Millwood HS	6 ft 3 in (1.91 m)	210 lb (95 kg)	Nov 23, 1999
Charles Dupree; LE	Recruit ratings: No ratings found				
Jerad Estus; RB	Wichita Falls, Texas	Hirschi HS	6 ft 1 in (1.85 m)	180 lb (82 kg)	Dec 12, 1999
Jerad Estus; RB	Recruit ratings: No ratings found				
Jerod Fields; OL	Bandera, Texas	Bandera HS	6 ft 7 in (2.01 m)	280 lb (130 kg)	Feb 1, 2000
Jerod Fields; OL	Recruit ratings: No ratings found				
Ataleo Ford; WR	Ardmore, Oklahoma	Ardmore HS	6 ft 1 in (1.85 m)	178 lb (81 kg)	Dec 9, 1999
Ataleo Ford; WR	Recruit ratings: No ratings found				
Michael Freeman; CB	Chino Hills, California	Mount San Antonio JC	5 ft 11 in (1.80 m)	180 lb (82 kg)	Jan 9, 2000
Michael Freeman; CB	Recruit ratings: No ratings found				
Ronbrose Jones; LE	Bristow, Oklahoma	Bristow HS	6 ft 2 in (1.88 m)	225 lb (102 kg)	Feb 2, 2000
Ronbrose Jones; LE	Recruit ratings: No ratings found				
Teddy Lehman; LB	Fort Gibson, Oklahoma	Fort Gibson HS	6 ft 1 in (1.85 m)	228 lb (103 kg)	Jul 23, 1999
Teddy Lehman; LB	Recruit ratings: No ratings found				
Vernon Maxwell; DB	Midwest City, Oklahoma	Midwest City HS	6 ft 3 in (1.91 m)	215 lb (98 kg)	Dec 23, 1999
Vernon Maxwell; DB	Recruit ratings: No ratings found				
Brian Odom; RB	Ada, Oklahoma	Ada HS	6 ft 0 in (1.83 m)	195 lb (88 kg)	Jan 11, 2000
Brian Odom; RB	Recruit ratings: No ratings found				
Will Peoples; WR	Humble, Texas	Humble HS	6 ft 1 in (1.85 m)	185 lb (84 kg)	Jan 4, 2000
Will Peoples; WR	Recruit ratings: No ratings found				
Antonio Perkins; ATH	Lawton, Oklahoma	Lawton HS	6 ft 0 in (1.83 m)	178 lb (81 kg)	Dec 19, 2000
Antonio Perkins; ATH	Recruit ratings: No ratings found				
Juan Prishker; DT	McAllen, Texas	Blinn JC	6 ft 3 in (1.91 m)	265 lb (120 kg)	Jan 9, 1999
Juan Prishker; DT	Recruit ratings: No ratings found				
Brandon Shelby; ATH	Kansas City, Missouri	Rockhurst HS	5 ft 10 in (1.78 m)	185 lb (84 kg)	Jan 8, 2000
Brandon Shelby; ATH	Recruit ratings: No ratings found				
Terrance Simms; CB	Belle Glade, Florida	Hutchinson CC	6 ft 1 in (1.85 m)	185 lb (84 kg)	Jan 23, 2000
Terrance Simms; CB	Recruit ratings: No ratings found				
Wes Sims; OL	Weatherford, Oklahoma	Weatherford HS	6 ft 5 in (1.96 m)	310 lb (140 kg)	Oct 13, 1999
Wes Sims; OL	Recruit ratings: No ratings found				
Darren Stephens; DB	Lewisville, Texas	Lewisville HS	6 ft 3 in (1.91 m)	185 lb (84 kg)	Jan 16, 2000
Darren Stephens; DB	Recruit ratings: No ratings found				
Cliff Takawana; OL	Ardmore, Oklahoma	Ardmore HS	6 ft 3 in (1.91 m)	300 lb (140 kg)	Nov 28, 1999
Cliff Takawana; OL	Recruit ratings: No ratings found				
Hunter Wall; QB	Coppell, Texas	Coppell HS	6 ft 4 in (1.93 m)	220 lb (100 kg)	Jan 9, 2000
Hunter Wall; QB	Recruit ratings: No ratings found				
Rudy Wells; ATH	Linden, Texas	Kildare HS	6 ft 1 in (1.85 m)	200 lb (91 kg)	Nov 21, 1999
Rudy Wells; ATH	Recruit ratings: No ratings found				
Jimmy Wilkerson; LB	Omaha, Texas	Paul H. Pewitt HS	6 ft 4 in (1.93 m)	230 lb (100 kg)	Jan 31, 2000
Jimmy Wilkerson; LB	Recruit ratings: No ratings found				
Renaldo Works; RB	Tulsa, Oklahoma	Booker T. Washington HS	6 ft 1 in (1.85 m)	202 lb (92 kg)	Jan 27, 2000
Renaldo Works; RB	Recruit ratings: No ratings found				
Overall recruit ranking:
Note: In many cases, Scout, Rivals, 247Sports, On3, and ESPN may conflict in their listings of height and weight.; In these cases, the average was taken. ESPN grades are on a 100-point scale.; Sources:

== Schedule ==
Date	Time	Opponent	Rank	Site	TV	Result	Attendance
September 2	6:30 p.m.	UTEP*	No. 19	Oklahoma Memorial Stadium; Norman, OK	FSN PPV	W 55–14	74,761
September 9	6:30 p.m.	Arkansas State*	No. 20	Oklahoma Memorial Stadium; Norman, OK	FSN PPV	W 45–7	74,730
September 23	11:30 a.m.	Rice*	No. 17	Oklahoma Memorial Stadium; Norman, OK	FSN	W 42–14	74,794
September 30	2:00 p.m.	Kansas	No. 14	Oklahoma Memorial Stadium; Norman, OK		W 34–16	74,811
October 7	11:00 a.m.	vs. No. 11 Texas	No. 10	Cotton Bowl; Dallas, TX (Red River Shootout)	ABC	W 63–14	75,587
October 14	2:30 p.m.	at No. 2 Kansas State	No. 8	KSU Stadium; Manhattan, KS (College GameDay)	ABC	W 41–31	53,011
October 28	11:00 a.m.	No. 1 Nebraska	No. 3	Oklahoma Memorial Stadium; Norman, OK (rivalry) (College GameDay)	ABC	W 31–14	75,989
November 4	1:00 p.m.	at Baylor	No. 1	Floyd Casey Stadium; Waco, TX		W 56–7	31,106
November 11	12:00 p.m.	at No. 23 Texas A&M	No. 1	Kyle Field; College Station, TX (College GameDay)	ABC	W 35–31	87,188
November 18	2:30 p.m.	Texas Tech^{†}	No. 1	Oklahoma Memorial Stadium; Norman, OK	ABC	W 27–13	75,364
November 25	2:30 p.m.	at Oklahoma State	No. 1	Lewis Field; Stillwater, OK (Bedlam Series)	FSN	W 12–7	48,500
December 2	7:00 p.m.	vs. No. 8 Kansas State	No. 1	Arrowhead Stadium; Kansas City, MO (Big 12 Championship Game) (College GameDay)	ABC	W 27–24	79,655
January 3, 2001	7:00 p.m.	vs. No. 3 Florida State*	No. 1	Pro Player Stadium; Miami Gardens, FL (Orange Bowl) (College GameDay)	ABC	W 13–2	76,835
*Non-conference game; ^{†}Homecoming; Rankings from AP Poll released prior to the game; All times are in Central time

== Roster ==
2000 Oklahoma Sooners roster
Wide receivers: 4 Antonio Perkins – Freshman; 5 Julius McMillan – Junior; 6 Antwone Savage – Sophomore; 9 Mark Clayton – Freshman; 12 Curtis Fagan – Sophomore; 13 Damian Mackey – Sophomore; 15 Ataleo Ford – Freshman; 17 Andre Woolfolk – Sophomore; 28 Jarvis Smith – Freshman; 29 Will Peoples – Freshman; 41 John Connor – Sophomore; 82 Ryan Daniel – Sophomore; 84 Buck Scifres – Junior; Offensive line: 55 Jammal Brown – Freshman; 59 Stephen Burcham^{C} – Senior; 60 Wes Sims – Freshman; 61 Josh Tucker – Freshman; 62 Jay Ridenour – Sophomore; 63 Frank Romero – Junior; 64 Adam Panter – Freshman; 65 Will Mathis – Junior; 66 Jarrod Barclay – Freshman; 68 Howard Duncan – Junior; 69 Brad Davis – Sophomore; 70 Reese Travis – Senior; 71 Jerod Fields – Freshman; 72 Scott Kempenich – Senior; 73 Trevor Nutt – Junior; 75 Mike Skinner – Sophomore; 76 Al Baysinger – Senior; 77 Josh Smith – Sophomore; 78 Cliff Takawana – Freshman; Tight ends: 81 Chris Hammons^{C} – Senior; 85 Jeremy Hess – Sophomore; 87 John Stuever – Freshman; 88 Trent Smith – Sophomore; 90 Matt Anderson – Senior; Lance donley – Freshman	Quarterbacks: 8 Nate Hybl – Sophomore; 11 Hunter Wall – Freshman; 14 Josh Heupel^{C} – Senior; 16 Patrick Fletcher – Senior; 18 Jason White – Freshman; Running backs: 3 Josh Norman – Junior; 4 Brandon Shelby – Freshman; 21 Jay Hunt – Sophomore; 22 Quentin Griffin – Sophomore; 23 Jan Roeschmann – Junior; 24 Brian Odom – Freshman; 35 Seth Littrell^{C} – Senior; 36 Danny Cork – Sophomore; 39 Buster Kuhn – Senior; 43 Jamar Mozee – Freshman; 47 Renaldo Works – Freshman; 32 Branden Killingsworth – Freshman; Defensive line: 53 Eric Thunander – Sophomore; 62 Chike Ozumba – Sophomore; 74 Juan Prishker – Junior; 80 Dan Cody – Freshman; 84 Sam Sachek – Freshman; 86 Brian Friend – Sophomore; 87 Marcus Chretien – Junior; 88 John Sturch – Sophomore; 89 Cory Heinecke – Junior; 90 Eric Hilaire – Sophomore; 91 Ramon Richardson – Senior; 92 Corey Callens – Senior; 93 Kory Klein – Freshman; 94 Ryan Fisher – Senior; 95 Rocky Bright – Senior; 96 Jeremy Wilson-Guest – Senior; 97 John Williams – Sophomore; 98 David Jones – Freshman; 99 Bary Holleyman – Junior	Linebackers: 9 Roger Steffen – Senior; 10 Torrance Marshall^{C} – Senior; 20 Rocky Calmus^{C} – Junior; 36 Parker Neal – Sophomore; 37 Brandon Babb – Junior; 45 Jimmy Wilkerson – Freshman; 46 Brandon Moore – Senior; 48 Gayron Allen – Freshman; 52 K. Michael Delfs – Junior; 57 Derrick Hurst – Freshman; 50 Brian Jimerson – Freshman; 51 Ronbrose Jones – Freshman; 52 Tanner Reynolds – Sophomore; 54 Teddy Lehman – Freshman; 56 Brandon Pryor – Sophomore; Defensive backs: 1 Terrance Simms – Junior; 2 Derrick Strait – Freshman; 4 Brandon Shelby – Freshman; 7 Brandon Everage – Freshman; 11 Ontei Jones – Senior; 15 J.T. Thatcher – Senior; 19 Michael Thompson – Sophomore; 22 Laromie Hammer – Freshman; 25 Darren Stephens – Freshman; 27 Brent Jackson – Sophomore; 30 Matt Mayhew – Junior; 31 Marvin Shoulders – Senior; 32 Ty Kincannon – Sophomore; 33 Marcus Bivines – Senior; 34 Matt McCoy – Freshman; 38 Roy Williams – Sophomore; Kickers: 19 Jimmy Stewart – Freshman; 40 Tim Duncan – Junior; 83 Jeff Ferguson – Junior; Snapper: 67 Ben Panter – Junior
^{C} Captain † Starter at position

== Game summaries ==
=== UTEP ===
UTEP Miners at #19 Oklahoma Sooners

Team	1	2	3	4	Total
UTEP	7	0	7	0	14
• #19 Oklahoma	17	10	7	21	55

- Date: September 2
- Location: Oklahoma Memorial Stadium, Norman, Oklahoma
- Game attendance: 74,761
- TV announcers (FSN PPV): Bill Land (Play-by-play), Dean Blevins (Color) & Gary Reasons (Sideline)

=== Arkansas State ===
Arkansas State Indians at #20 Oklahoma Sooners

Team	1	2	3	4	Total
Arkansas State	0	7	0	0	7
• #20 Oklahoma	14	14	7	10	45

- Date: September 9
- Location: Oklahoma Memorial Stadium, Norman, Oklahoma
- Game attendance: 74,730
- TV announcers (FSN PPV): Bill Land (Play-by-play), Dean Blevins (Color) & Gary Reasons (Sideline)

=== Rice ===
Rice Owls at #17 Oklahoma Sooners

Team	1	2	3	4	Total
Rice	6	0	8	0	14
• #17 Oklahoma	14	7	14	7	42

- Date: September 23
- Location: Oklahoma Memorial Stadium, Norman, Oklahoma
- Game attendance: 74,794
- TV announcers (FSN): Drew Goodman (Play-by-play), Dave Lapham (Color), Jim Knox (Sideline)

=== Kansas ===
Kansas Jayhawks at #14 Oklahoma Sooners

Team	1	2	3	4	Total
Kansas	13	3	0	0	16
• #14 Oklahoma	10	14	10	0	34

- Date: September 30
- Location: Oklahoma Memorial Stadium, Norman, Oklahoma
- Game attendance: 74,811

=== Texas (Red River Shootout) ===
#11 Texas Longhorns vs. #10 Oklahoma Sooners

Team	1	2	3	4	Total
#11 Texas	0	7	0	7	14
• #10 Oklahoma	14	28	14	7	63

- Date: October 7
- Location: Cotton Bowl, Dallas
- Game attendance: 75,587
- TV announcers (ABC): Sean Grande (Play-by-play) & David Norrie (Color)

=== Kansas State ===
#8 Oklahoma Sooners at #2 Kansas State Wildcats

Team	1	2	3	4	Total
• #8 Oklahoma	17	14	7	3	41
#2 Kansas State	7	7	3	14	31

- Date: October 14
- Location: KSU Stadium, Manhattan, Kansas
- Game attendance: 53,011
- TV announcers (ABC): Brent Musburger (Play-by-play), Gary Danielson (Color), Leslie Gudel (Sideline)

=== Nebraska ===
#1 Nebraska Cornhuskers at #3 Oklahoma Sooners

Team	1	2	3	4	Total
#1 Nebraska	14	0	0	0	14
• #3 Oklahoma	0	24	7	0	31

- Date: October 28
- Location: Oklahoma Memorial Stadium, Norman, Oklahoma
- Game attendance: 75,989
- TV announcers (ABC): Brad Nessler (Play-by-play), Bob Griese (Color) & Lynn Swann (Sideline)

Scoring summary
1	12:02	NEB	Matt Davison 39 yard pass from Eric Crouch (Josh Brown kick)	NEB 7-0
1	8:11	NEB	Eric Crouch 37 yard run (Josh Brown kick)	NEB 14-0
2	14:13	OU	Quentin Griffin 1 yard run (Tim Duncan kick)	NEB 14-7
2	9:43	OU	Curtis Fagan 34 yard pass from Josh Heupel (Tim Duncan kick)	Tied 14-14
2	6:06	OU	Tim Duncan 19 yard field goal	OU 17-14
2	2:41	OU	Josh Norman 8 yard run (Tim Duncan kick)	OU 24-14
3	10:23	OU	Derrick Strait 32 yard interception return (Tim Duncan kick)	OU 31-14

=== Baylor ===
#1 Oklahoma Sooners at Baylor Bears

Team	1	2	3	4	Total
• #1 Oklahoma	28	14	14	0	56
Baylor	0	0	7	0	7

- Date: November 4
- Location: Floyd Casey Stadium, Waco, Texas
- Game attendance: 31,106

=== Texas A&M ===
#1 Oklahoma Sooners at #23 Texas A&M Aggies

Team	1	2	3	4	Total
• #1 Oklahoma	3	7	3	22	35
#23 Texas A&M	7	10	7	7	31

- Date: November 11
- Location: Kyle Field, College Station, Texas
- Game attendance: 87,188
- TV announcers (ABC): Brent Musburger (Play-by-play), Gary Danielson (Color), Jack Arute (Sideline)

=== Texas Tech ===
Texas Tech Red Raiders at #1 Oklahoma Sooners

Team	1	2	3	4	Total
Texas Tech	0	3	0	10	13
• #1 Oklahoma	7	7	7	7	28

- Date: November 18
- Location: Oklahoma Memorial Stadium, Norman, Oklahoma
- Game attendance: 75,364
- TV announcers (ABC): Charlie Jones (Play-by-play) & Reggie Rivers (Color)

=== Oklahoma State (Bedlam Series) ===
#1 Oklahoma Sooners at Oklahoma State Cowboys

Team	1	2	3	4	Total
• #1 Oklahoma	7	5	0	0	12
Oklahoma State	0	0	7	0	7

- Date: November 25
- Location: Lewis Field, Stillwater, Oklahoma
- Game attendance: 48,500
- TV announcers (FSN): Ron Thulin (Play-by-play), James Lofton (Color), Eric Clemons (Sideline)

=== Kansas State (Big 12 Championship Game) ===
#8 Kansas State Wildcats vs. #1 Oklahoma Sooners

Team	1	2	3	4	Total
#8 Kansas State	0	10	7	7	24
• #1 Oklahoma	3	7	7	10	27

- Date: December 2
- Location: Arrowhead Stadium, Kansas City, Missouri
- Game attendance: 79,655
- TV announcers (ABC): Brad Nessler (Play-by-play), Bob Griese (Color) & Jack Arute (Sideline)

=== Florida State (Orange Bowl) ===
#2 Florida State Seminoles vs. #1 Oklahoma Sooners

Team	1	2	3	4	Total
#2 Florida State	0	0	0	2	2
• #1 Oklahoma	3	0	3	7	13

- Date: January 2
- Location: Pro Player Stadium, Miami Gardens, Florida
- Game attendance: 76,835
- TV announcers (ABC): Brad Nessler (Play-by-play), Bob Griese (Color) & Lynn Swann (Sideline)

== Rankings ==
Ranking movements Legend: ██ Increase in ranking ██ Decrease in ranking ( ) = First-place votes
	Week																
Poll	Pre	1	2	3	4	5	6	7	8	9	10	11	12	13	14	15	Final
AP	19	19	20	18	17	14	10	8	3 (4)	3 (3)	1 (69)	1 (70)	1 (70)	1 (70)	1 (64)	1 (67)	1 (71)
Coaches Poll	20	19	20	18	16	16	12	8	4 (1)	3 (1)	1 (55)	1 (58)	1 (57)	1 (56)	1 (49)	1 (56)	1 (59)
BCS	Not released									2	1	1	1	1	1	1	Not released

== Awards and honors ==
=== Awards and Big 12 honors ===
Weekly Awards
Player	Award	Date	Ref
J.T. Thatcher	Big 12 Special Teams Player of the Week	September 9	
Rocky Calmus	Big 12 Co-Defensive Player of the Week	September 23	
J. T. Thatcher	Big 12 Defensive Player of the Week	September 30	
Rocky Calmus	Big 12 Defensive Player of the Week	October 7	
J.T. Thatcher	Big 12 Special Teams Player of the Week	October 7	
Josh Heupel	Big 12 Offensive Player of the Week	October 14	
J.T. Thatcher	Big 12 Special Teams Player of the Week	October 14	
Josh Heupel	Big 12 Offensive Player of the Week	October 28	
Torrance Marshall	Big 12 Defensive Player of the Week	October 28	
J.T. Thatcher	Big 12 Special Teams Player of the Week	November 4	
Torrance Marshall	Big 12 Co-Defensive Player of the Week	November 11	
Rocky Calmus	Big 12 Co-Defensive Player of the Week	November 25	

Conference Awards
Person	Position	Award	Ref
Bob Stoops	Head coach	Big 12 Coach of the Year	
Josh Heupel	QB	Big 12 Offensive Player of the Year	

Individual Awards
Player	Position	Award	Ref
Bob Stoops	Head coach	Associated Press College Football Coach of the Year Award	
Bob Stoops	Head coach	Paul "Bear" Bryant Award	
Bob Stoops	Head coach	Home Depot Coach of the Year Award	
Bob Stoops	Head coach	Walter Camp Coach of the Year Award	
Mark Mangino	Offensive coordinator	Broyles Award	
Josh Heupel	QB	Walter Camp Award	
J. T. Thatcher	DB	Mosi Tatupu Award	

=== All-Americans ===
All-Americans
Player	AP	AFCA	FWAA	TSN	WCFF	Designation
Rocky Calmus						Consensus
Josh Heupel						Consensus
J. T. Thatcher						Consensus
The NCAA recognizes a selection to all five of the AP, AFCA, FWAA, TSN and WCFF first teams for unanimous selections and three of five for consensus selections. HM = Honorable mention. Source:

All-Big 12
Player	Position	Team
Josh Heupel	QB	1st team
Rocky Calmus	LB	1st team
Ryan Fisher	DL	1st team
J. T. Thatcher	DB	1st team
Roy Williams	DB	1st team
Quentin Griffin	RB	2nd team
Frank Romero	RB	2nd team
Antwone Savage	WR	2nd team
Torrance Marshall	LB	2nd team
Jeff Ferguson	P	2nd team
J. T. Thatcher	PR	2nd team
Bubba Burcham	OL	3rd team
Scott Kempenich	OL	3rd team
Andre Woolfolk	WR	3rd team
Ramon Richardson	DL	3rd team
Derrick Strait	DL	3rd team
Curtis Fagan	WR	HM
Josh Norman	WR	HM
Trent Smith	TE	HM
Corey Callins	DL	HM
Brandon Everage	DB	HM
Corey Heinecke	DL	HM
Otnei Jones	DB	HM
Roger Steffen	LB	HM
Michael Thompson	DB	HM
HM = Honorable mention. Source:

Academic All-Big 12
Player	Position	Class	Ref
Rocky Bright	DL	Senior	
Ryan Fisher	DL	Senior	
Quentin Griffith	RB	Sophomore	
Chris Hammons	TE	Senior	
Nate Hybl	QB	RS Sophomore	
Scott Kempenich	OL	Senior	
Kory Klein	DL	RS Freshman	
Matthew Mayhew	DB	Junior	
Matt McCoy	DB	RS Freshman	
Ben Panter	C	Junior	
Josh Smith	OL	Sophomore	
Michael Thompson	DB	Sophomore	
Reese Travis	OL	Senior	

== 2001 NFL draft ==
The 2001 NFL draft was held on April 21–22, 2001 at the Theatre at Madison Square Garden in New York City. The following Oklahoma players were either selected or signed as undrafted free agents following the draft.

Round	Pick	Player	Position	NFL team
3	72	Torrance Marshall	Linebacker	Green Bay Packers
6	177	Josh Heupel	Quarterback	Miami Dolphins
