= Mike Rivera =

Mike Rivera may refer to:

- Mike Rivera (baseball) (born 1976), Major League Baseball catcher
- Mike Rivera (American football) (born 1986), American football linebacker
