= J. T. Thatcher =

American football player (born 1978)

No. 15
- Position: Defensive back

Personal information
- Born: July 12, 1978 (age 48); Oklahoma City, Oklahoma, U.S.
- Listed height: 5 ft 10 in (1.78 m)
- Listed weight: 224 lb (102 kg)

Career information
- High school: Norman (Norman, Oklahoma)
- College: Oklahoma
- NFL draft: 2001: undrafted

Career history
- San Francisco 49ers (2001)*; Oakland Raiders (2002)*
- * Offseason or practice squad member only

Awards and highlights
- BCS national champion (2000); Consensus All-American (2000); First-team All-Big 12 (2000); Mosi Tatupu Award (2000)

J. T. Thatcher (born July 12, 1978) is an American former college football player who was a defensive back for the Oklahoma Sooners. He was named a consensus All-American in 2000.

== Early life ==
J. T. Thatcher was born in Oklahoma City, Oklahoma, on July 12, 1978. He attended Norman High School in Norman, Oklahoma.

== College career ==
Thatcher was a member of the Oklahoma Sooners of the University of Oklahoma from 1997 to 2000. He played both wide receiver and running back in 1997, totaling 21 carries for 54 yards and one touchdown and four receptions for 45 yards. He was listed as a running back in 1998 but did not play any. Thatcher was moved to defensive back in 1999 but appeared on special teams for most of the season, returning four punts for 146 yards and one touchdown. In 2000, he started the first seven games of the season at defensive back. He was then benched for performance for two games before returning as the starter. Overall, he recorded 60 tackles, eight interceptions for 162 yards and one touchdown, and 16 pass breakups while also returning 38 punts for 599 yards and two touchdowns and 11 kicks for 264 yards. He led the Big 12 Conference in interceptions, interception return yards, interception return touchdown, punt returns, and punt return yards that season. Thatcher also finished third in the country in interceptions, third in punt returns, and second in punt return yards. He was named a consensus All-American for his performance during the 2000 season. The 2000 Sooners were consensus national champions. Thatcher also won the Mosi Tatupu Award in 2000, given to the best special teams player in the country.

== Professional career ==
Thatcher was rated the 15th best free safety in the 2001 NFL draft by NFLDraftScout.com. Pro Football Weekly stated that Thatcher "Can make a team with his return skills and possibly develop as a defensive back with lots of reps and more experience." He signed with the San Francisco 49ers in April 2001 after going undrafted. He was released in June 2001. Thatcher also spent time with the Oakland Raiders and was released on April 21, 2002.

== See also ==
- 2000 College Football All-America Team
