= 2004 All-Big 12 Conference football team =

The 2004 All-Big 12 Conference football team consists of American football players chosen as All-Big 12 Conference players for the 2004 Big 12 Conference football season. The conference recognizes two official All-Big 12 selectors: (1) the Big 12 conference coaches selected separate offensive and defensive units and named first- and second-team players (the "Coaches" team); and (2) a panel of sports writers and broadcasters covering the Big 12 also selected offensive and defensive units and named first- and second-team players (the "Media" team).

== Offensive selections ==
=== Quarterbacks ===
- Jason White, Oklahoma (Coaches-1; Media-1)
- Reggie McNeal, Texas A&M (Coaches-2; Media-2)

=== Running backs ===
- Adrian Peterson, Oklahoma (Coaches-1; Media-1)
- Cedric Benson, Texas (Coaches-1; Media-1)
- Vernand Morency, Oklahoma State (Coaches-2; Media-2)
- Darren Sproles, Kansas State (Coaches-2; Media-2)

=== Centers ===
- Vince Carter, Oklahoma (Coaches-1; Media-1)
- Dylan Gandy, Texas Tech (Media-2)

=== Guards ===
- Sam Mayes, Oklahoma State (Coaches-1; Media-1)
- Joe Vaughn, Kansas (Coaches-2; Media-2)
- Tony Palmer, Missouri (Coaches-2)
- Cale Stubbe, Iowa State (Coaches-2)
- Davin Joseph, Oklahoma (Media-2)

=== Tackles ===
- Jammal Brown, Oklahoma (Coaches-1; Media-1)
- Jonathan Scott, Texas (Coaches-1; Media-1)
- Justin Blalock, Texas (Coaches-1; Media-2)
- Jeromey Clary, Kansas State (Coaches-2)
- Daniel Loper, Texas Tech (Media-2)

=== Tight ends ===
- Bo Scaife, Texas (Coaches-1)
- Billy Bajema, Oklahoma State (Media-1)
- David Thomas, Texas (Coaches-2; Media-2)
- Brian Casey, Kansas State (Coaches-2)
- Joe Klopfenstein, Colorado (Coaches-2)

=== Receivers ===
- Mark Clayton, Oklahoma (Coaches-1; Media-1)
- Terrence Murphy, Texas A&M (Coaches-1; Media-2)
- Jarrett Hicks, Texas Tech (Coaches-2; Media-1)
- Todd Blythe, Iowa State (Media-2)

== Defensive selections ==
=== Defensive linemen ===
- Dan Cody, Oklahoma (Coaches-1; Media-1)
- Mike Montgomery, Texas A&M (Coaches-1; Media-1)
- David McMillan, Kansas (Coaches-1; Media-2)
- Atiyyah Ellison, Missouri (Coaches-1)
- Nick Leaders, Iowa State (Coaches-1)
- C. J. Mosley, Missouri (Media-1)
- Adell Duckett, Texas Tech (Coaches-2; Media-1)
- Jonathan Jackson, Oklahoma (Coaches-2; Media-1)
- Larry Dibbles, Texas (Coaches-2; Media-2)
- Rodrique Wright, Texas (Coaches-2; Media-2)

=== Linebackers ===
- Barrett Ruud, Nebraska (Coaches-1; Media-1)
- Lance Mitchell, Oklahoma (Coaches-1; Media-1)
- Derrick Johnson, Texas (Coaches-1; Media-1)
- Nick Reid, Kansas (Coaches-2; Media-1)
- James Kinney, Missouri (Coaches-2; Media-1)
- Aaron Harris, Texas (Coaches-2)
- Rufus Alexander, Oklahoma (Media-2)
- Justin Crook, Baylor (Media-2)
- Brian Iwuh, Colorado (Media-2)
- Mike Smith, Texas Tech (Media-2)

=== Defensive backs ===
- Ellis Hobbs, Iowa State (Coaches-1; Media-1)
- Charles Gordon, Kansas (Coaches-1; Media-1)
- Michael Huff, Texas (Coaches-1; Media-2)
- Donte Nicholson, Oklahoma (Coaches-1)
- Brodney Pool, Oklahoma (Coaches-2; Media-1)
- Jaxon Appel, Texas A&M (Media-1)
- Josh Bullocks, Nebraska (Coaches-2)
- Phillip Geiggar, Texas (Coaches-2)
- Byron Jones, Texas A&M (Coaches-2)
- Maurice Lane, Baylor (Media-2)
- Jason Simpson, Missouri (Media-2)
- Jamie Thompson, Oklahoma State (Media-2)

== Special teams ==
=== Kickers ===
- Mason Crosby, Colorado (Coaches-1; Media-1)
- Todd Pregram, Texas A&M (Coaches-2; Media-2)

=== Punters ===
- Daniel Sepulveda, Baylor (Coaches-1; Media-1)
- John Torp, Colorado (Coaches-1; Media-1)

=== All-purpose / Return specialists ===
- Willie Andrews, Baylor (Coaches-1; Media-2)
- Danny Amendola, Texas Tech (Coaches-1)
- Darren Sproles, Kansas State (Media-1)
- Stephone Robinson, Colorado (Coaches-2)

== Key ==
Bold = selected as a first-team player by both the coaches and media panel

Coaches = selected by Big 12 Conference coaches

Media = selected by a media panel

== See also ==
- 2004 College Football All-America Team
