= Antonio Perkins =

American gridiron football player (born 1982)

No. 30
- Position: Cornerback

Personal information
- Born: January 9, 1982 (age 44); Lawton, Oklahoma, U.S.
- Listed height: 5 ft 11 in (1.80 m)
- Listed weight: 190 lb (86 kg)

Career information
- High school: Lawton
- College: Oklahoma
- NFL draft: 2005: 4th round, 103rd overall pick

Career history
- Cleveland Browns (2005–2006); Indianapolis Colts (2007)*; Toronto Argonauts (2008)*
- * Offseason or practice squad member only

Awards and highlights
- BCS national champion (2000); Unanimous All-American (2003); First-team All-Big 12 (2003); Second-team All-Big 12 (2002)
- Stats at Pro Football Reference

Antonio Perkins (born January 9, 1982) is an American former professional football player who was a kick returner and cornerback for two seasons with the Cleveland Browns of the National Football League (NFL) during the early 2000s. He played college football for the Oklahoma Sooners, earning unanimous All-American honors. Perkins was selected by the Browns in the fourth round of the 2005 NFL draft.

== Early life ==
Perkins was born in Lawton, Oklahoma. He attended Lawton High School, graduating in 2000. He was a letterman in football, basketball and track.

== College career ==
Perkins attended the University of Oklahoma, and played for coach Bob Stoops's Oklahoma Sooners football team from 2000 to 2004. In 47 games with the Sooners, he started 30 times and finished with 125 tackles, one sack, five stops for losses, two forced fumbles, two fumble recoveries and 21 pass deflections. He set the NCAA record for most punt returns for touchdowns in a single game, with three, as well as most punt return yards in a game with 277, against UCLA in 2003. He is tied with Wes Welker and Ted Ginn Jr. for second most punt return touchdowns in a career with eight second to Dante Pettis of the Washington Huskies who has nine. As a junior in 2003, he was a first-team All-Big 12 selection, and was recognized as a unanimous All-American.

== Professional career ==
Perkins was drafted in the fourth round, 103rd overall, by the Cleveland Browns in the 2005 NFL draft. He played in one game in 2005 and activated for five games in 2006. The Browns waived Perkins on October 28, 2006, but subsequently re-signed him and assigned him to their practice squad. In June 2007, Perkins was waived by Cleveland and claimed by the Indianapolis Colts then released as a final training camp cut on September 1.

On March 28, 2008, the Toronto Argonauts signed Perkins as a free agent. He was subsequently released on June 14.
