= Tony Palmer (American football) =

American football player (born 1983)

No. 64
- Position: Offensive guard

Personal information
- Born: February 23, 1983 (age 43); Midwest City, Oklahoma, U.S.
- Listed height: 6 ft 2 in (1.88 m)
- Listed weight: 311 lb (141 kg)

Career information
- High school: Midwest City
- College: Missouri
- NFL draft: 2006: 7th round, 243rd overall pick

Career history
- St. Louis Rams (2006)*; Green Bay Packers (2006–2007)
- * Offseason or practice squad member only

Awards and highlights
- First-team All-Big 12 (2005); Second-team All-Big 12 (2004)

Career NFL statistics
- Games played: 8
- Stats at Pro Football Reference

Tony Arnez Palmer Jr. (born February 23, 1983) is an American former professional football player who was a guard in the National Football League (NFL). He played college football for the Missouri Tigers and was selected by the St. Louis Rams in the seventh round of the 2006 NFL draft. He was signed by the Green Bay Packers after being cut in the 2006 preseason by St. Louis. Palmer was released by the Packers in the 2008 offseason.

== Early life ==
Palmer was selected First-team All-state by the Daily Oklahoman as well as All-Metro and All-city honors on offense. He also had a solid defensive career as well, racking up 133 tackles and forcing 11 fumbles, with six of the forced fumbles as a senior.

== College career ==
At the University of Missouri he was voted First-team All-Big 12 in his senior season. In addition, he was Second-team All-Big 12 in 2004 and was honorably mentioned in 2003. As a freshman, in 2002, he was named in the Big 12 All-Freshman team.

== Professional career ==
Pre-draft measurables
Height	Weight	40-yard dash	Bench press
6 ft 1 5/8 in (1.87 m)	330 lb (150 kg)	5.52 s	41 reps
All values from Missouri's Pro Day

Palmer was selected with the 235th pick (seventh round) of the 2006 NFL draft. He was cut by the Rams in August, 2006.

He was signed by the Packers and remained with the club for the 2006 and 2007 season. He was released in the 2008 off-season.

== Personal life ==
Palmer is a cousin of former MLB star, Joe Carter.
