= Ryan Lilja =

American football player (born 1981)

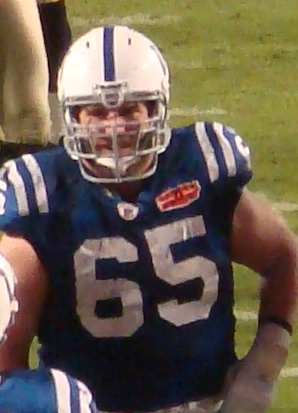
- Lilja with the Indianapolis Colts during Super Bowl XLIV in 2010

No. 65
- Position: Center / Guard

Personal information
- Born: October 15, 1981 (age 45); Kansas City, Missouri, U.S.
- Listed height: 6 ft 2 in (1.88 m)
- Listed weight: 290 lb (132 kg)

Career information
- High school: Shawnee Mission (KS) Northwest
- College: Kansas State
- NFL draft: 2004: undrafted

Career history
- Kansas City Chiefs (2004)*; Indianapolis Colts (2004−2009); Kansas City Chiefs (2010−2012); Denver Broncos (2013)*
- * Offseason or practice squad member only

Awards and highlights
- Super Bowl champion (XLI); Second-team All-Big 12 (2003)

Career NFL statistics
- Games played: 111
- Games started: 104
- Fumble recoveries: 1
- Stats at Pro Football Reference

Ryan Matthew Lilja (born October 15, 1981) is an American former professional football player who was a center and guard in the National Football League (NFL). He played college football for the Kansas State Wildcats, and signed with the Kansas City Chiefs as an undrafted free agent in 2004, and later played with them from 2010 to 2012. Lilja also played with the Indianapolis Colts from 2004 to 2009, with whom he won Super Bowl XLI over the Chicago Bears.

== Early life ==
Ryan and his brothers were raised in Kansas City. Lilja attended Shawnee Mission Northwest High School and was a student and a letterman in football and golf. In football, he was a three-year starter.

== College career ==
He was a two-year starter at Coffeyville Community College before he transferred to Kansas State University, where he was a two-year player who started 14 of 23 career games. Lilja was named to the second-team All-Big Twelve squad in 2003.

== Professional career ==
=== Kansas City Chiefs (first stint) ===
The Kansas City Chiefs signed Lilja as an undrafted free agent prior to the 2004 season. He was waived on September 5, 2004, with the intention of signing him to the practice squad if he cleared waivers.

=== Indianapolis Colts ===
On September 6, 2004, Lilja was claimed off waivers by the Indianapolis Colts soon after the Chiefs waived him.

The Colts re-signed Lilja on February 19, 2008, to a five-year deal worth $20 million.

Lilja was released on March 8, 2010. He started 59 of 66 games for them and two Super Bowls.

=== Kansas City Chiefs (second stint) ===
On March 16, 2010, Lilja re-signed with the Kansas City Chiefs.

=== Denver Broncos ===
After announcing his retirement on December 31, 2012, Lilja agreed to terms to join the Denver Broncos on July 31, 2013. He was released on August 31, 2013.
