= Livv Headphones =

Headphone company

- Company type: Private
- Industry: Audio
- Founded: 2013
- Founder: Mark Clayton
- Products: Headphones
- Website: http://www.livvheadphones.com/

Livv Headphones is a wireless headphone brand designed specifically for athletes. The company was founded in 2013 by former NFL wide receiver Mark Clayton.

== Products ==
Livv Headphones is targeted for the active lifestyle demographic. The product is primarily intended for athletes and made with audiophile-quality components. The company goes by the motto “designed for the athlete, made by an athlete.”
