= Mark Clayton (American football, born 1982) =

American football player (born 1982)

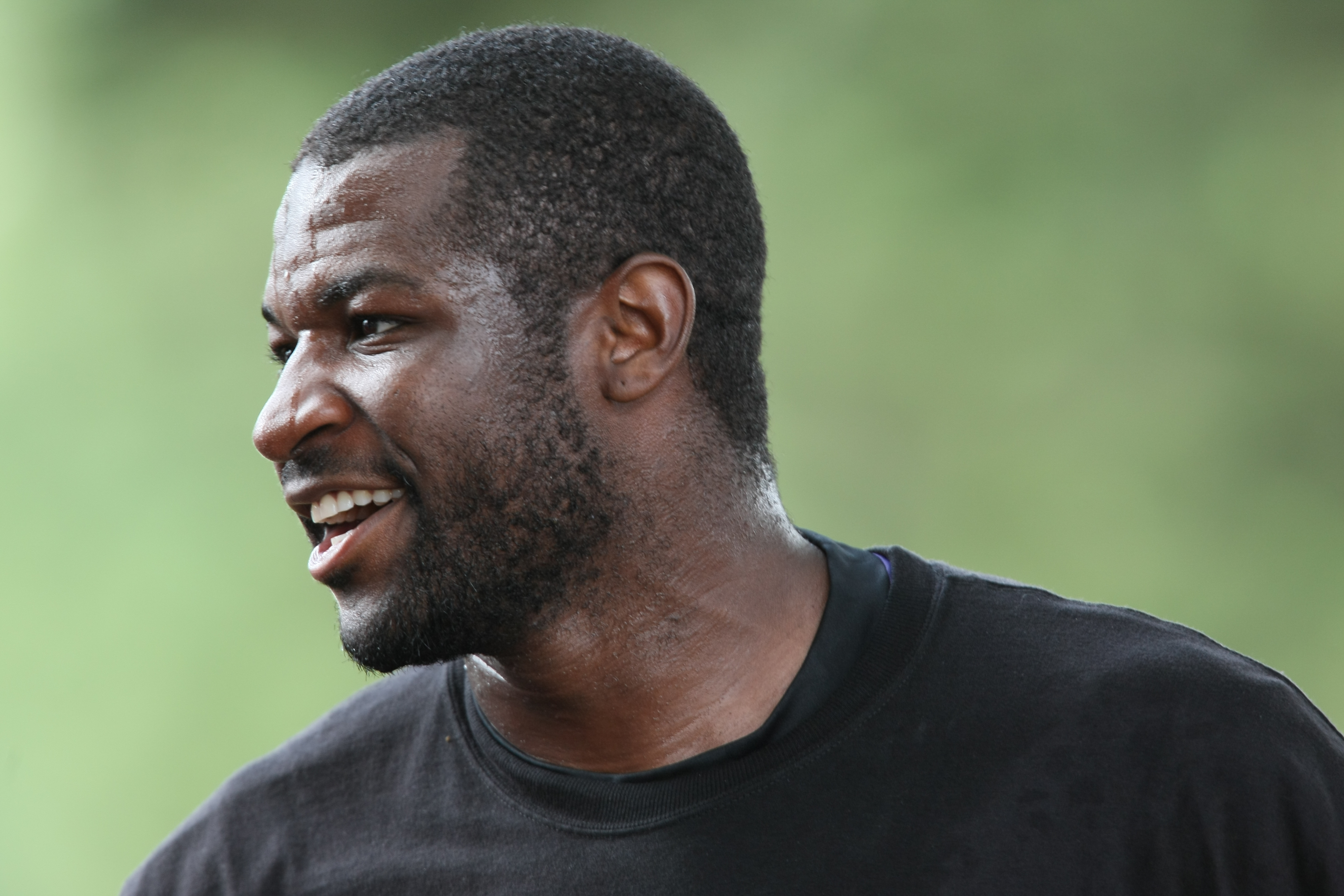
- Clayton in 2009

No. 89
- Position: Wide receiver

Personal information
- Born: July 2, 1982 (age 44); Oklahoma City, Oklahoma, U.S.
- Listed height: 5 ft 10 in (1.78 m)
- Listed weight: 195 lb (88 kg)

Career information
- High school: Sam Houston (Arlington, Texas)
- College: Oklahoma (2000–2004)
- NFL draft: 2005: 1st round, 22nd overall pick

Career history
- Baltimore Ravens (2005–2009); St. Louis Rams (2010–2011)

Awards and highlights
- PFWA All-Rookie Team (2005); BCS national champion (2000); 2× First-team All-American (2003, 2004); 2× First-team All-Big 12 (2003, 2004)

Career NFL statistics
- Receptions: 260
- Receiving yards: 3,448
- Receiving touchdowns: 14
- Rushing yards: 118
- Rushing touchdowns: 2
- Stats at Pro Football Reference

Mark Jermaine Clayton (born July 2, 1982) is an American former professional football player who was a wide receiver in the National Football League (NFL). Clayton played college football for the Oklahoma Sooners from 2001 to 2004 earning first-team All-American honors twice. He was selected by the Baltimore Ravens in the first round of the 2005 NFL draft and also played for the St. Louis Rams.

== College career ==
After redshirting in Oklahoma's 2000 national championship season, Clayton's college career began in 2001, when he started 8 of Oklahoma's 13 games, and made 46 catches for 524 yards and 3 touchdowns as the Sooners won the Cotton Bowl Classic. In 2002, he made only one start, but managed 26 receptions for 416 yards, including 5 touchdowns, which tied for the team lead among receivers. In that year, the Sooners won the Big 12 championship as well as the Rose Bowl, a first for any Big 12 team.

His profile exploded in 2003, as he garnered All-American and All-Big 12 honors after a junior season in which he took aim on the school record book. His 83 receptions, 1,425 yards, and 15 touchdowns all smashed previous marks (66, 1,034, and 7, respectively). The quarterback who threw the passes, Jason White, won the Heisman Trophy, and the Sooners advanced to the Sugar Bowl before losing to national champion LSU. Clayton was a Biletnikoff Award finalist. Several of Clayton's "highlight reel" catches during this season demonstrated his ability to gain large numbers of yards after the catch (YAC).

Clayton's 2004 senior year again netted All-America and All-Big 12 recognition, though his 66 receptions, 876 yards, and 8 touchdowns were not quite as eye-popping as the previous season. The Sooners again won the Big 12 championship and played for the national title against USC, though they lost in the Orange Bowl. Clayton set the record for career receiving yards with 3,241.

Clayton obtained his communications degree in 2010 through the university's degree completion program.

== Professional career ==
=== Pre-draft ===
Pre-draft measurables
Height	Weight	Arm length	Hand span	40-yard dash	10-yard split	20-yard split	20-yard shuttle	Three-cone drill	Vertical jump	Broad jump	Bench press	Wonderlic
5 ft 10 3/8 in (1.79 m)	193 lb (88 kg)	30 5/8 in (0.78 m)	9 1/8 in (0.23 m)	4.41 s	1.53 s	2.64 s	4.07 s	6.95 s	36 1/2 in (0.93 m)	9 ft 10 in (3.00 m)	x reps	21
All values from NFL Combine

=== Baltimore Ravens ===
Clayton was the 22nd overall selection in the first round of the 2005 NFL draft by the Baltimore Ravens.

==== 2005 ====
Clayton started his rookie season slowly due to various injuries but picked up speed during the latter part of the season; a major part of his rehabilitation process was guided by his best friend Christopher Pannozzo. He finished the year with 44 receptions for 471 yards and 2 touchdowns. He also added 8 rushes for 33 yards and a touchdown.

==== 2006 ====
In his second year, Clayton stats improved significantly, with 67 receptions for 939 yards and 5 touchdowns.

==== 2007 ====
In 2007, Clayton had 48 receptions for 531 yards, down from his impressive 2006 season. He dealt with various injuries throughout the 2007 season but was active for most of it.

==== 2008 ====
In 2008, Clayton had some bright spots during the year. He had 4 catches for 87 yards and a touchdown against the Cleveland Browns, 5 catches for 164 yards and a touchdown against the Cincinnati Bengals, and 4 catches for 128 yards against the Jacksonville Jaguars. The Ravens won each game. Clayton had receptions of 70, 48, and 53 yards.

In Week 13, at the division rival Cincinnati Bengals, Clayton had what was arguably the best game of his career. He had five receptions for 164 yards, which included a 70-yard receiving touchdown, the second longest touchdown of his career. He also had one pass attempt on a trick end-around play, which he completed for a 32-yard touchdown pass to fellow wide receiver Derrick Mason, the only touchdown pass of his career. Clayton helped the Ravens rout the Bengals 34–3.

Clayton finished the season with 695 yards on 41 receptions, 3 receiving TDs, 1 rushing TD, and 1 passing TD.

==== 2009 ====
Clayton had his least productive year as a full-time, healthy starter in 2009, as QB Joe Flacco targeted WR Mason, TE Todd Heap, and RB Ray Rice more than Clayton. In fact, Rice led the team in receptions for much of the year. Clayton finished the season with 34 receptions for 480 yards, and two touchdowns.

=== St. Louis Rams ===
==== 2010 ====
On September 6, 2010, Clayton was traded to the St. Louis Rams along with a seventh round pick in the 2011 NFL draft in exchange for a sixth round selection in the 2011 NFL draft. In his first game as a Ram and having only been with the club less than a week Clayton caught 10 passes for 119 yards (two touchdowns) to lead the team in both categories. In Week 5, Clayton was placed on injury reserve with a torn patellar tendon in his right knee, which ended his season. Before the injury, he had emerged as a valued veteran presence on the team, and rookie Sam Bradford's top receiving target. He was re-signed by the Rams on August 31, 2011.

==== 2011 ====
In the 2011 season, Clayton played in two games, starting one, and caught three passes for 26 yards.

=== Retirement ===
In May 2013, Clayton announced his retirement from football. He finished his career with 260 receptions for 3,448 yards and 14 touchdowns.

== NFL career statistics ==
Year	Team	GP	Receiving					Rushing					Passing			
Year	Team	GP	Rec	Yds	Avg	Lng	TD	Att	Yds	Avg	Lng	TD	Cmp	Att	Yds	TD
2005	BAL	14	44	471	10.7	47	2	8	33	4.1	11	1	0	1	0	0
2006	BAL	16	67	939	14.0	87	5	7	-30	-4.3	3	0	0	1	0	0
2007	BAL	16	48	531	11.1	52	0	0	0	0.0	0	0	0	1	0	0
2008	BAL	16	41	695	17.0	70	3	6	81	13.5	42	1	1	1	32	1
2009	BAL	14	34	480	14.1	54	2	4	28	7.0	12	0	1	1	0	0
2010	STL	5	23	306	11.9	39	2	1	6	6.0	6	0	0	0	0	0
2011	STL	2	3	26	8.7	12	0	0	0	0.0	0	0	0	0	0	0
Career		83	260	3,448	13.3	87	14	26	118	4.5	42	2	2	5	32	1

== Entrepreneur ==
Mark Clayton is the founder of Livv Headphones. He also founded a Christian based clothing line called MyChristianT (MCT).
