= Wes Sims (American football) =

American football player (born 1981)

No. 60
- Position: Offensive guard

Personal information
- Born: April 8, 1981 (age 45); Weatherford, Oklahoma, U.S.
- Listed height: 6 ft 6 in (1.98 m)
- Listed weight: 330 lb (150 kg)

Career information
- High school: Weatherford (OK)
- College: Oklahoma
- NFL draft: 2005: 6th round, 177th overall pick

Career history
- San Diego Chargers (2005); Carolina Panthers (2006)*; New Orleans Saints (2007)*
- * Offseason or practice squad member only

Awards and highlights
- BCS national champion (2000); Freshman All-American (2001)
- Stats at Pro Football Reference

Wesley O. Sims (born April 8, 1981) is an American former professional football player in the National Football League (NFL).

== Early life ==
Sims attended Weatherford High School in Weatherford, Oklahoma and was a letterman and a standout in football and track & field. In football, he was a USA Today All-USA selection, and helped lead his team to the Class 4A state title as a senior. In track and field, Sims set the state records in the shot put (65 ft), and the discus (195 ft), winning the state championship four times indoor shot put, twice in outdoor shot put, and twice in discus.

== Football career ==
He chose Oklahoma over Texas, Arkansas, Nebraska, Penn State, and Florida State.

Sims was selected by the Miami Dolphins as a sixth round pick (177th overall). He was traded with Jamar Fletcher to the San Diego Chargers for David Boston. He played one game for the Chargers.

He was also a member of the Carolina Panthers and New Orleans Saints.
