= North Mesquite High School =

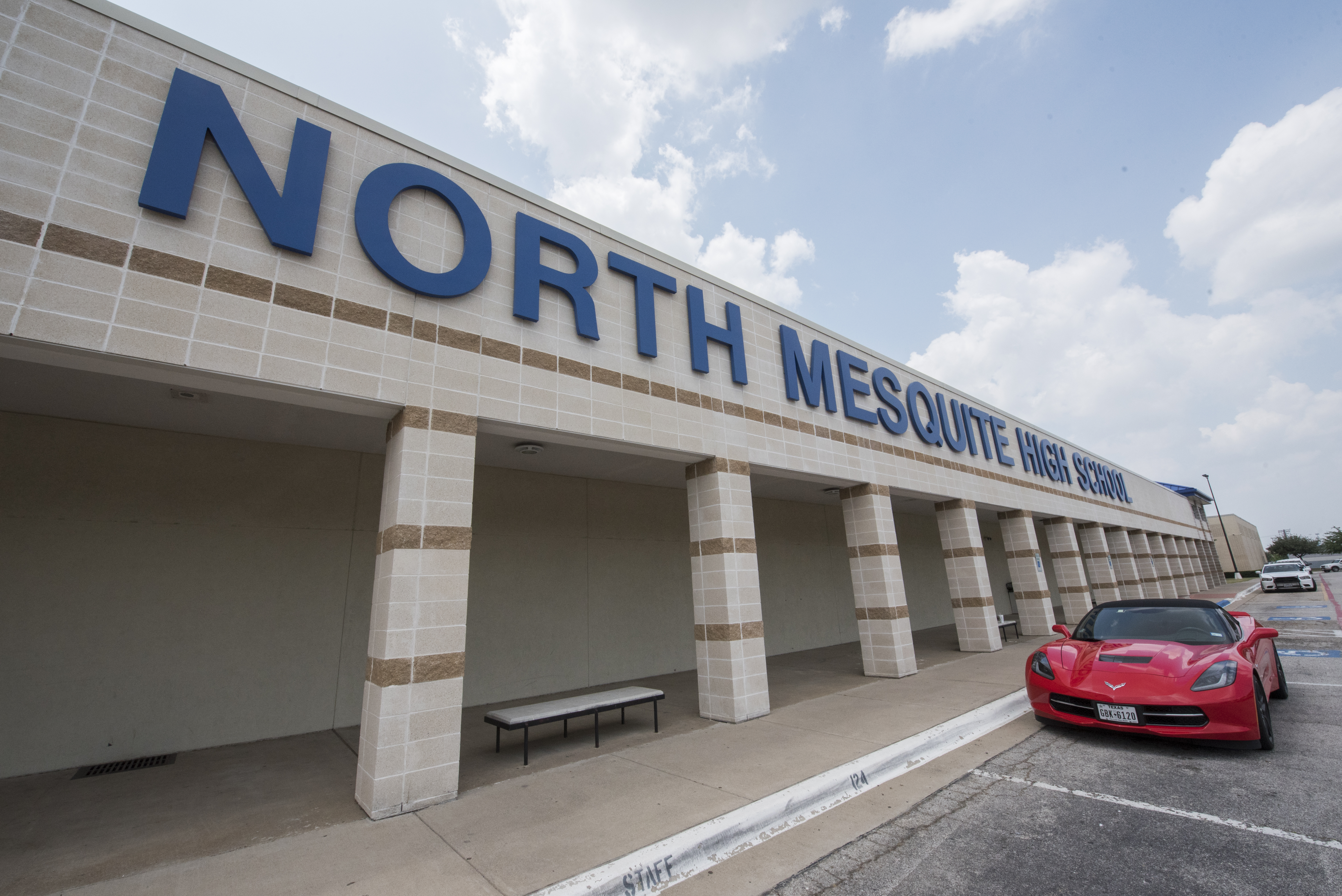
- Exterior of North Mesquite High School

Location
- 18201 LBJ Freeway; Mesquite, Texas 75150-4191; United States; 32°48′32″N 96°37′44″W

Information
- Motto: Animus Omnia Vincit
- Established: 1969
- School district: Mesquite Independent School District
- CEEB code: 444712
- Administrator: Kenneth Washington
- Teaching staff: 178.39 (FTE)
- Grades: 9-12
- Enrollment: 2,591 (2018-19)
- Student to teacher ratio: 14.52
- Colors: Blue, White
- Slogan: Dream. Believe. Achieve
- Mascot: Stallion
- Publication: 22 years ago
- Newspaper: Blue Prints
- Yearbook: Trailblazer
- Website: northmesquitehighschool.mesquiteisd.org

North Mesquite High School is a secondary school in Mesquite, Texas and a part of the Mesquite Independent School District (MISD). As of 2025, the school serves northern portions of Mesquite bounded by US 80 to the south and I-635 to the east in addition to the area bounded by Galloway Avenue, I-635, and I-30. Formerly, North Mesquite served all of Sunnyvale before the completion of Sunnyvale High School, leaving the class of 2010 the last North Mesquite class catering to Sunnyvale students. North Mesquite also formerly served the MISD portion of Garland before redistricting. This area is now served by Poteet High School.

North Mesquite serves grades 9 through 12. The total enrollment in 2002 was 2450; the school is therefore under the UIL AAAAAA (or 6A) division. According to the MISD Report Card, the per-student expenditure for the same 2002 period was 2700 USD. The stallion is the school mascot, and the school colors are blue and white. The school's motto is Animus Omnia Vincit, which translates from the Latin as "Courage Conquers All."

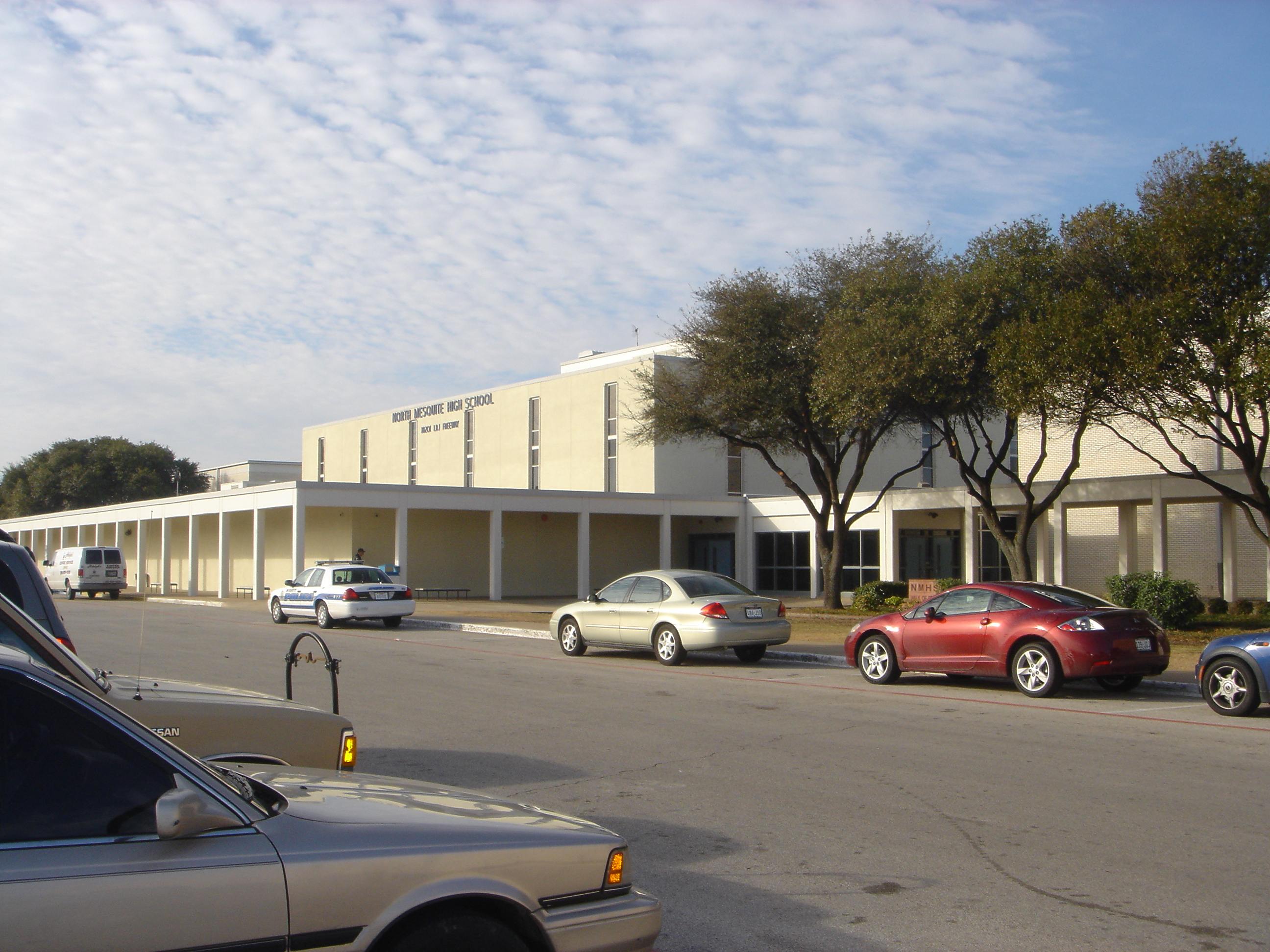
North Mesquite High School before renovation

== History ==
North Mesquite High School opened in September 1969 as the second high school in Mesquite ISD, behind Mesquite High School, the school's rival in athletic competitions. The original construction consisted of four floors: A, B, C, and D. Over several decades, the enrollment expanded in accordance with the population swell that took place in Mesquite and Sunnyvale, demanding supplementary facilities. In the 1990s, a new gym was constructed. F wing and E section opened for the 2002-2003 school year, providing twenty new general classrooms as well as a new Band, Orchestra, and Choir hall. During the 2008-2009 school year, construction on the S wing (Science wing) began and opened for the 2009-2010 school year, providing 8 Labs and 16 science classrooms. With the science wing being added, the existing rooms on the A floor were renovated, and new classrooms were added. The front of the school was renovated; a new entrance was created, and the business office was enlarged and renovated. The cafeteria was enlarged, and snack lines were added. In September 2018, a statue of the school’s mascot, a Stallion, was placed inside the building right at the entrance.

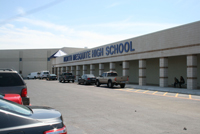
North Mesquite after renovation

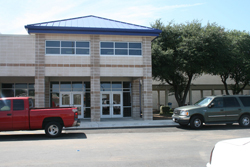
North Mesquite's New Entrance

== Areas served by North Mesquite ==
North Mesquite serves northern portions of the city of Mesquite.

Formerly, the school also served all high school students living in Sunnyvale. However, in an election on May 12, 2007, Sunnyvale residents passed a bond creating Sunnyvale High School. From the 2007-2008 school year, ninth-grade students in Sunnyvale were housed in Sunnyvale Middle School for two years, until the construction of the high school was complete. Beginning in the 2009-2010 school year, students attended classes at the actual SHS campus. One grade was added consecutively to the high school, making the class of 2010 the last North Mesquite class that catered to Sunnyvale students. Thomas Korosec of D Magazine implied that changing racial demographics at North Mesquite may have motivated the Sunnyvale district to build its own high school.

== Demographics ==
As of 2025, the school is 76% Hispanic, 14% African American, 7% White, and 3% other, including Asian and multiracial.

== Standardized dress code ==
All students in North Mesquite are required to dress according to a standardized dress code (similar to a school uniform) as of 2005; the code is used in all Mesquite ISD middle schools, high schools, and some Elementary schools in the district

== Feeder patterns ==
Mesquite ISD elementary schools that feed into North Mesquite include all of Florence, Lawrence, McKenzie, Motley, Range, Rugel, Shands, and Tosch. Price Elementary used to be a part of the feeder pattern for NMHS, but that was changed in 2017 for student benefit.

Part of McDonald Middle School and all of Vanston Middle School in Mesquite ISD feed into North Mesquite. (The other alumni of McDonald fed into West Mesquite High School until they were redirected to Frasier Middle School)

== Rivalry ==
North Mesquite's rival is Mesquite High School. The rivalry dates back to when North Mesquite was founded in 1969. The school was the first to split from Mesquite High, which was then the only high school in the city, and thus the rivalry started.

== Big Blue Band ==
The North Mesquite Band, known as the Big Blue Band, was started with the opening of the school in 1969.

== Notable alumni ==
- Dave Abbruzzese, drummer for Pearl Jam from 1991 to 1994
- Joe Bowden, Oklahoma linebacker, later played for Dallas Cowboys
- Tarell Brown, University of Texas defensive back, drafted by the San Francisco 49ers in the 2007 NFL draft in round 5 (147 overall)
- Bryan Hickman, Kansas State linebacker
- Josh Buhl, Kansas State linebacker
- Todd Graham, former Hawaii head football coach
- Jerry Hall, model and ex-wife of Mick Jagger
- Amy Hooks, current Lamar University head softball coach; received several awards as a Texas Longhorns softball player
- Frank Kassela, professional poker player, World Series of Poker Player of the Year 2010
- Cory McGee, US olympic middle distance runner
- Ralph Barbosa, comedian
- Paul Martin Lester, clinical professor for the School of Arts, Technology, and Emerging Communication, the University of Texas at Dallas, Richardson, Texas (1971 Graduate)
- Dezmin Lewis, NFL player
- J'Marcus Webb, offensive tackle with the Seattle Seahawks
