= Josh Norman (tight end) =

American football player (born 1980)

No. 83
- Position: Tight end

Personal information
- Born: July 27, 1980 (age 46); Midland, Texas, U.S.
- Listed height: 6 ft 2 in (1.88 m)
- Listed weight: 236 lb (107 kg)

Career information
- College: Oklahoma
- NFL draft: 2002: undrafted

Career history
- San Diego Chargers (2002–2003); New York Jets (2005)*; Oakland Raiders (2005)*
- * Offseason or practice squad member only

Awards and highlights
- BCS national champion (2000)

Career NFL statistics
- Receptions: 22
- Receiving yards: 273
- Receiving touchdowns: 2
- Stats at Pro Football Reference

Joshua Lee Norman (born July 27, 1980) is an American former professional football player who was a tight end in the National Football League (NFL). He was signed by the San Diego Chargers as an undrafted free agent in 2002. He played college football for the Oklahoma Sooners. He had 22 receptions for 273 yards and two touchdowns in his NFL career.

Pre-draft measurables
Height	Weight	Arm length	Hand span	40-yard dash	10-yard split	20-yard split	20-yard shuttle	Vertical jump	Broad jump	Bench press
6 ft 2 in (1.88 m)	236 lb (107 kg)	32 3/4 in (0.83 m)	9 1/4 in (0.23 m)	4.65 s	1.65 s	2.68 s	4.23 s	32.0 in (0.81 m)	9 ft 7 in (2.92 m)	18 reps
All values from NFL Combine
