= Josh Buhl =

American football player (born 1981)

No. 7
- Position: Linebacker

Personal information
- Born: May 4, 1981 (age 45)
- Listed height: 6 ft 0 in (1.83 m)
- Listed weight: 210 lb (95 kg)

Career information
- College: Kansas State
- NFL draft: 2004: undrafted

Career history
- Cleveland Browns (2004)*; Rhein Fire (2005); Amsterdam Admirals (2005); Tampa Bay Buccaneers (2005)*; Denver Broncos (2005-2006)*
- * Offseason or practice squad member only

Awards and highlights
- First-team All-American (2003); First-team All-Big 12 (2003)

Josh Buhl (born May 4, 1981) is an American former football linebacker. He played collegiately at Kansas State and had a brief professional career.

== High school ==
Buhl attended North Mesquite High School in Mesquite, Texas and was a high school teammate of Bryan Hickman.

== College career ==
At K-State, Buhl teamed up with fellow Texas high school linebackers, Terry Pierce and Bryan Hickman to make a formidable linebacking crew for the Wildcats. Buhl finished his career at Kansas State as part of the conference championship team beating #1 Oklahoma and a berth in the Fiesta Bowl and first team All Big 12. He was also named a Sporting News All-American, and totaled 184 tackles, 109 unassisted, in 2003.

== Professional career ==
He was undrafted in the 2004 NFL draft but signed with the Cleveland Browns. In 2005, he played in NFL Europe for the Rhein Fire and the Amsterdam Admirals and later played that season for the Tampa Bay Buccaneers and recorded a tackle against the Jacksonville Jaguars in a preseason game.
