= Dena Dubal =

American neurodegenerative disease researcher

Dena Bharat Dubal
- Education: University of California, Berkeley (BSc); University of Kentucky (MD)
- Scientific career
- Workplaces: University of California, San Francisco
- Thesis: Estradiol protects the brain against stroke injury : potential mechanisms of action (2001)
- Website: Dubal Laboratory

Dena Dubal is the David A. Coulter Endowed Chair in Aging and Neurodegenerative Disease at University of California, San Francisco. Dubal has demonstrated that the hormone Klotho can enhance cognition and protect the brain from neurodegenerative decline.

== Early life and education ==
Dubal is from Houston. She attended Episcopal High School and graduated in 1992. She was an undergraduate student at the University of California, Berkeley, where she studied neuroscience with a minor in anthropology. During her undergraduate physiology classes, she recognised that the process of ageing still presented many mysteries to the scientific community. After earning her bachelor's degree, Dubal studied medicine at the University of Kentucky College of Medicine. She worked with Phyllis Wise on the impact of hormones on brain injuries caused by stroke. She was a neurological resident at the University of California, San Francisco, where she was elected Chief Resident and continued to research ageing.

== Research and career ==
Dubal studies the molecular mechanisms of resilience and how these are impacted by neurodegenerative diseases. She holds the David A. Coulter Endowed Chair in Ageing and Neurodegenerative Disease at University of California, San Francisco, and practises as a neurologist in San Francisco. In 2011, she started working on the Klotho hormone. At the time it was known that mice who were bred to make extra Klotho had lives that were 30% longer than those without it. Dubal demonstrated that mice with Alzheimer's disease with extra Klotho were protected from dementia. She went on to show that the brains of healthy mice with extra Klotho were not only protected from neurodegeneration, but their cognitive abilities were enhanced. It has since been shown that Klotho can act to protect against Parkinson's and multiple sclerosis. The mechanisms that underpin Klotho's enhancement of cognitive ability are still unknown.

Alongside working on mouse models, in 2019, Dubal was the first to show that Klotho may protect people from Alzheimer's disease. She demonstrated this by monitoring for the well-known Alzheimer's disease risk factors Apolipoprotein E (APOE) e4. Dubal revealed that patients with the genetic variant APOE e4 have biomarkers of Alzheimer's disease, even before experiencing symptoms, whilst patients with APOE e4 and Klotho do not have these biomarkers.

Dubal has identified a biological mechanism – an epigenetic change on the X chromosome – that may give rise to why women live longer. She has shown that female mice with a particular pattern of sex hormones during their ovarian cycle are more likely to suffer from cognitive decline.

== Awards and honours ==
- 2009 American Federation for Aging Research Paul Beeson Career Development Award
- 2015 American Neurological Association Grass Neuroscience Award

== Selected publications ==
- Dubal, D. B. (2001-02-06). "Estrogen receptor alpha, not beta, is a critical link in estradiol-mediated protection against brain injury". Proceedings of the National Academy of Sciences. 98 (4): 1952–1957. Bibcode:2001PNAS...98.1952D. doi:10.1073/pnas.041483198. ISSN 0027-8424. PMC 29363. PMID 11172057.
- Dubal, Dena B.; Kashon, Michael L.; Pettigrew, L. Creed; Ren, Jing M.; Finklestein, Seth P.; Rau, Shane W.; Wise, Phyllis M. (1998-11-01). "Estradiol Protects against Ischemic Injury". Journal of Cerebral Blood Flow & Metabolism. 18 (11): 1253–1258. doi:10.1097/00004647-199811000-00012. ISSN 0271-678X. PMID 9809515.
- Dubal, Dena B.; Shughrue, Paul J.; Wilson, Melinda E.; Merchenthaler, Istvan; Wise, Phyllis M. (1999-08-01). "Estradiol Modulates bcl-2 in Cerebral Ischemia: A Potential Role for Estrogen Receptors". The Journal of Neuroscience. 19 (15): 6385–6393. doi:10.1523/jneurosci.19-15-06385.1999. ISSN 0270-6474. PMC 6782804. PMID 10414967.
