= Teddy Lehman =

American football player (born 1981)

No. 54, 58, 57
- Position: Linebacker

Personal information
- Born: November 18, 1981 (age 44); Tulsa, Oklahoma, U.S.
- Listed height: 6 ft 1 in (1.85 m)
- Listed weight: 238 lb (108 kg)

Career information
- High school: Fort Gibson (Fort Gibson, Oklahoma)
- College: Oklahoma
- NFL draft: 2004: 2nd round, 37th overall pick

Career history
- Detroit Lions (2004–2007); Tampa Bay Buccaneers (2008)*; Detroit Lions (2008)*; Buffalo Bills (2008); Las Vegas Locomotives (2009); Jacksonville Jaguars (2010)*; Las Vegas Locomotives (2010–2011)
- * Offseason or practice squad member only

Awards and highlights
- BCS national champion (2000); Dick Butkus Award (2003); Chuck Bednarik Award (2003); Unanimous All-American (2003); Consensus All-American (2002); 2× First-team All-Big 12 (2002, 2003); Big 12 Defensive Player of the Year (2003); 2× UFL champion (2009, 2010)

Career NFL statistics
- Total tackles: 151
- Sacks: 1
- Forced fumbles: 2
- Pass deflections: 5
- Interceptions: 2
- Stats at Pro Football Reference

Teddy Lehman (born November 18, 1981) is an American former professional football player who was a linebacker for seven seasons in the National Football League (NFL). He played college football for the Oklahoma Sooners, and was twice recognized as a consensus All-American. The Detroit Lions chose him in the second round of the 2004 NFL draft, and he also played for the Buffalo Bills and Jacksonville Jaguars of the NFL, and the Las Vegas Locomotives of the United Football League (UFL).

== Early life ==
Lehman was born in Tulsa, Oklahoma. He attended Fort Gibson High School in Fort Gibson, Oklahoma, and played high school football for the Fort Gibson Tigers. He started at both linebacker and running back, wearing number 34. As a senior, he helped the Tigers post their best-ever record of 13–1, and advance to the Oklahoma Class 4A state championship game.

He ended his senior season with 151 tackles, 3 interceptions, 2 sacks, and 3 forced fumbles. He ranked third in the state in rushing with 1,252 yards and 16 touchdowns on 206 carries (6.1 avg.) as a running back. He also shared the punting duties for the Tigers with an average of 39.6 yards.

He recorded more than 400 tackles and 7 interceptions during his four high school seasons. He was not highly recruited out of high school but ran a 4.4 40-yard dash at an Oklahoma football camp for high school players and was offered a scholarship shortly after.

== College career ==
While attending the University of Oklahoma, Lehman played for coach Bob Stoops's Oklahoma Sooners football team from 2000 to 2003. As a freshman in 2000, he played in 12 games, mostly on special teams and as a reserve at linebacker.

During his 2001 sophomore season, he became the starting middle linebacker. Memorably, he caught the interception by Texas quarterback Chris Simms which was jarred loose by Roy Williams and Lehman took it into the endzone for the game clinching score. He finished the season with 83 tackles, including 2 sacks and 10 stops for losses.

In 2002, Lehman moved to weakside linebacker, replacing Butkus Award winner Rocky Calmus. Lehman was recognized as a consensus first-team All-American, after receiving first-team honors from the Associated Press, the Football Writers Association of America, the Walter Camp Foundation, The Sporting News, CNNSI, ESPN and Sports Illustrated. He posted six tackles (five unassisted) in the Rose Bowl against Washington State and sacked quarterback Jason Gesser twice for a loss of 17 yards. Both sacks ended scoring drives at the end of the second quarter and were instrumental in securing Oklahoma's first-ever Rose Bowl win.

During the 2003 season, the senior led the team in tackles, with 117, adding 1 forced fumbles, 2 interceptions, and 19 tackles for loss. Lehman closed out his college career in the 21–14 Sugar Bowl loss against the LSU Tigers with eight tackles (six solo) and two stops behind the line of scrimmage, including one sack. He was recognized as a unanimous first-team All-American and a first-team All-Big 12 selection. He was awarded the Dick Butkus Award, given to the nation's top linebacker, as well as the Chuck Bednarik Award, given to the nation's top defensive player. Lehman was rated the top outside linebacker pro prospect in the country by The NFL Draft Report.

== Professional career ==
Pre-draft measurables
Height	Weight	Arm length	Hand span	40-yard dash	10-yard split	20-yard split	20-yard shuttle	Three-cone drill	Vertical jump	Broad jump	Bench press
6 ft 1 1/2 in (1.87 m)	240 lb (109 kg)	31 3/8 in (0.80 m)	8 3/8 in (0.21 m)	4.53 s	1.66 s	2.70 s	4.06 s	6.85 s	34.5 in (0.88 m)	9 ft 5 in (2.87 m)	26 reps
All values from NFL Combine/Pro Day

=== Detroit Lions (first stint) ===
Teddy Lehman was selected by the Detroit Lions with the fifth pick of the second round (37th overall) in 2004.

Lehman was the only rookie linebacker in the NFL to start all 16 games in 2004. He also logged a total of 1,225 plays (1,054 on defense, 171 on special teams), more than any other member of the team. He finished the season with 102 tackles, the second-highest total on the team.

=== Tampa Bay Buccaneers ===
He signed with the Tampa Bay Buccaneers as an unrestricted free-agent on March 4, 2008. However, he was released on July 25.

=== Detroit Lions (second stint) ===
On July 26, 2008, Lehman re-signed with the Detroit Lions. His No. 54 taken by Gilbert Gardner, Lehman was assigned No. 58. He was placed on Injured Reserve on August 4. On August 8, he was taken off IR and released.

=== Buffalo Bills ===
Lehman was signed by the Buffalo Bills on November 7, 2008, after cornerback Ashton Youboty was placed on injured reserve.

=== Las Vegas Locomotives ===
Lehman signed with the Las Vegas Locomotives of the United Football League on August 5, 2009.

=== Jacksonville Jaguars ===
On May 11, 2010, Teddy Lehman signed a contract with the Jacksonville Jaguars. He was one of eight players that participated in the club's May 1–3 mini-camp on a tryout basis. On September 3, 2010, he was released by the Jaguars.

== NFL career statistics ==
Legend
**Bold**	Career high

Year	Team	Games		Tackles					Interceptions					Fumbles			
Year	Team	GP	GS	Cmb	Solo	Ast	Sck	TFL	Int	Yds	TD	Lng	PD	FF	FR	Yds	TD
2004	DET	**16**	**16**	**103**	**76**	**27**	**1.0**	**7**	**1**	1	0	1	**3**	**1**	0	0	0
2005	DET	5	0	13	8	5	0.0	1	**1**	**21**	0	**17**	2	0	0	0	0
2006	DET	4	0	5	4	1	0.0	0	0	0	0	0	0	0	0	0	0
2007	DET	**16**	0	27	17	10	0.0	0	0	0	0	0	0	**1**	0	0	0
2008	BUF	4	0	3	1	2	0.0	0	0	0	0	0	0	0	0	0	0
Career		45	16	151	106	45	1.0	8	2	22	0	17	5	2	0	0	0

== Life after football ==
Lehman, his wife, Erin, and their son Edward reside in Norman, Oklahoma. Teddy hosts a local sports talk radio show, The Rush, on KREF, and co-hosts the Oklahoma Breakdown podcast alongside former OU player Gabe Ikard. He also serves as the color analyst for University of Oklahoma football radio broadcasts.
