= 2003 All-Big 12 Conference football team =

The 2003 All-Big 12 Conference football team consists of American football players chosen as All-Big 12 Conference players for the 2003 NCAA Division I-A football season. The conference recognizes two official All-Big 12 selectors: (1) the Big 12 conference coaches selected separate offensive and defensive units and named first- and second-team players (the "Coaches" team); and (2) a panel of sports writers and broadcasters covering the Big 12 also selected offensive and defensive units and named first- and second-team players (the "Media" team).

== Offensive selections ==
=== Quarterbacks ===
- Jason White, Oklahoma (Coaches-1; Media-1)
- B. J. Symons, Texas Tech (Coaches-2; Media-2)

=== Running backs ===
- Tatum Bell, Oklahoma State (Coaches-1; Media-1)
- Darren Sproles, Kansas State (Coaches-1; Media-1)
- Zack Abron, Missouri (Coaches-2; Media-2)
- Cedric Benson, Texas (Coaches-2; Media-2)

=== Centers ===
- Nick Leckey, Kansas State (Coaches-1; Media-1)
- Marwan Hage, Colorado (Media-2)

=== Guards ===
- Tillman Holloway, Texas (Coaches-1; Media-1)
- A. J. Ricker, Missouri (Coaches-1; Media-2)
- Ryan Lilja, Kansas State (Coaches-2; Media-2)
- Sam Mayes, Oklahoma State (Coaches-2; Media-2)
- Daniel Loper, Texas Tech (Coaches-2)

=== Tackles ===
- Jammal Brown, Oklahoma (Coaches-1; Media-1)
- Vince Carter, Oklahoma (Coaches-1; Media-2)
- Rob Droege, Missouri (Coaches-2; Media-1)
- Richie Incognito, Nebraska (Coaches-2; Media-1)

=== Tight ends ===
- Matt Herian, Nebraska (Coaches-1; Media-2)
- Mickey Peters, Texas Tech (Media-1)
- Billy Bajema, Oklahoma State (Coaches-2)

=== Receivers ===
- Rashaun Woods, Oklahoma State (Coaches-1; Media-1)
- Mark Clayton, Oklahoma (Coaches-1; Media-1)
- James Terry, Kansas State (Coaches-2; Media-2)
- Roy Williams, Texas (Coaches-2; Media-2)

== Defensive selections ==
=== Defensive linemen ===
- Dan Cody, Oklahoma (Coaches-1; Media-1)
- Dusty Dvoracek, Oklahoma (Coaches-1; Media-1)
- Tommie Harris, Oklahoma (Coaches-1; Media-1)
- Greg Richmond, Oklahoma State (Coaches-1; Media-1)
- Marcus Tubbs, Texas (Coaches-1; Media-2)
- Adell Duckett, Texas Tech (Media-2)
- Gabe Nyenhuis, Colorado (Coaches-2)
- Andrew Shull, Kansas State (Coaches-2; Media-2)
- Justin Montgomery, Kansas State (Coaches-2)
- C.J. Mosley, Missouri (Coaches-2)
- Ryon Bingham, Nebraska (Coaches-2)
- Rodrique Wright, Texas (Media-2)

=== Linebackers ===
- Josh Buhl, Kansas State (Coaches-1; Media-1)
- Teddy Lehman, Oklahoma (Coaches-1; Media-1)
- Derrick Johnson, Texas (Coaches-1; Media-1)
- Demorrio Williams, Nebraska (Coaches-2; Media-1)
- John Garrett, Baylor (Coaches-2)
- Bryan Hickman, Kansas State (Media-2)
- James Kinney, Missouri (Media-2)
- Barrett Ruud, Nebraska (Media-2)
- Gabe Toomey, Kansas (Media-2)

=== Defensive backs ===
- Josh Bullocks, Nebraska (Coaches-1; Media-1)
- Derrick Strait, Oklahoma (Coaches-1; Media-1)
- Darrent Williams, Oklahoma State (Coaches-1; Media-1)
- Nathan Vasher, Texas (Coaches-1; Media-1)
- Jaxson Appel, Texas A&M (Media-2)
- Ryan Aycock, Texas Tech (Coaches-2; Media-2)
- Medford Moorer, Colorado (Coaches-2)
- Donte Nicholson, Oklahoma (Media-2)
- Brodney Pool, Oklahoma (Coaches-2)
- Rashad Washington, Kansas State (Coaches-2; Media-2)

== Special teams ==
=== Kickers ===
- Trey DiCarlo, Oklahoma (Coaches-1; Media-1)
- Luke Phillips, Oklahoma State (Coaches-2; Media-2)

=== Punters ===
- Kyle Larson, Nebraska (Coaches-1; Media-1)
- Cole Farden, Oklahoma State (Media-2)
- Daniel Sepulveda, Baylor (Coaches-2)

=== All-purpose / Return specialists ===
- Wes Welker, Texas Tech (Coaches-1; Media-1)
- Antonio Perkins, Oklahoma (Coaches-1; Media-2)
- Terrence Murphy, Texas A&M (Coaches-2)

== Key ==
Bold = selected as a first-team player by both the coaches and media panel

Coaches = selected by Big 12 Conference coaches

Media = selected by a media panel

== See also ==
- 2003 College Football All-America Team
