= Fort Gibson Public Schools =

School district in Oklahoma, United States

Address
- 500 South Ross Avenue Fort Gibson, Muskogee, Oklahoma, 74434; United States
- Coordinates: 35.792542°N 95.240265°W

District information
- Type: Co-Educational, Public
- Grades: PK–12
- Superintendent: Scott Farmer
- Accreditation: Oklahoma State Department of Education

Students and staff
- Enrollment: approx. 2,500
- Faculty: On average 350
- District mascot: Tiger
- Colors: Red and white

Other information
- Website: fortgibsontigers.org

Fort Gibson Public School is located in the small town of Fort Gibson, Oklahoma. The school mascot is the tiger.

The school district includes Fort Gibson and parts of Muskogee.

== Alumni ==
Teddy Lehman attended Fort Gibson High School and graduated in 2000.

== School shooting ==
On December 6, 1999, 13-year-old middle school student Seth Trickey shot four classmates with a Taurus PT92. The victims were taken to area hospitals, there were no fatalities. One student found a bullet embedded in a book inside of his backpack days later. After emptying the 15 round clip, and while still pulling the trigger, Trickey was convinced by the school safety officer to surrender the gun and taken into custody, where he stated that he did not know why he did the shooting.

Despite the prosecutors efforts to try him as an adult, Trickey was tried as a juvenile and was convicted in May 2000. In November 2003, he was released into the custody of his grandparents in Kansas. His state supervision ended in March 2005.
