= Bryan Hickman =

American football player (1981–2012)

No. 18
- Position: Linebacker

Personal information
- Born: January 18, 1981; Mesquite, Texas
- Died: January 3, 2012 (aged 30)
- Listed height: 6 ft 2 in (1.88 m)
- Listed weight: 220 lb (100 kg)

Career information
- College: Kansas State
- NFL draft: 2004: undrafted

Career history
- Cleveland Browns

Awards and highlights
- Second-team All-Big 12 (2003)

Bryan Hickman (January 3, 1981 – January 3, 2012) was an American football linebacker. He played collegiately at Kansas State and had a brief professional career before suffering a career ending knee injury.

== High school ==
Hickman attended North Mesquite High School in Mesquite, Texas and was teammates with another Kansas State linebacker, Josh Buhl.

== College career ==
At Kansas State, Hickman teamed up with fellow Texas high school linebackers, Terry Pierce and Josh Buhl to make a formidable linebacking crew for the Wildcats. In a home game against Iowa State in 2002, he recorded double-digit tackles, a tackle for loss, an interception and a forced fumble. Hickman finished his career at Kansas State as part of the conference championship team beating #1 Oklahoma and a berth in the Fiesta Bowl and second team All-Big 12. Hickman totaled four interceptions. He graduated with a degree in business.

== Professional career ==
Bryan was with the NFL's Cleveland Browns when a knee injury ended his career.

== Death ==
He died via suicide in January 2012.
