= Dan Cody =

American football player (born 1981)

No. 53
- Position: Linebacker

Personal information
- Born: December 1, 1981 (age 44); Ada, Oklahoma, U.S.
- Listed height: 6 ft 5 in (1.96 m)
- Listed weight: 255 lb (116 kg)

Career information
- High school: Ada
- College: Oklahoma
- NFL draft: 2005: 2nd round, 53rd overall pick

Career history
- Baltimore Ravens (2005–2007)

Awards and highlights
- BCS national champion (2000); First-team All-American (2004); Third-team All-American (2003); 2× First-team All-Big 12 (2003, 2004)

Career NFL statistics
- Total tackles: 1
- Stats at Pro Football Reference

Daniel Price Cody (born December 1, 1981) is an American former professional football player who was a linebacker in the National Football League (NFL). He played college football for the Oklahoma Sooners and was selected by the Baltimore Ravens in the second round of the 2005 NFL draft.

== Early life ==
Cody won the MVP in high school his freshman, sophomore, junior and senior year, although he attend two different high schools: Coalgate High School in Coalgate, Oklahoma freshman/sophomore years and Ada High School in Ada junior/senior years.

== College career ==
Cody played his college football at the University of Oklahoma, eventually playing in 42 games and making 117 tackles and 25 sacks. He was a Sociology major.

== Professional career ==
Cody was selected by the Baltimore Ravens in the second round (53rd overall) in the 2005 NFL draft. His rookie season was ended on the first day of training camp with a knee injury.

On November 19, 2006, Cody played in his first NFL game.

Cody started the 2007 season on the Physically Unable to Perform list due to knee injuries and remained on the list the rest of the season.

Cody was released by the Ravens on August 27, 2008, after defensive end Marques Douglas was acquired from the Tampa Bay Buccaneers.
