= Torrance Marshall =

American football player (born 1977)

No. 51, 41
- Position: Linebacker

Personal information
- Born: June 12, 1977 (age 49); Miami, Florida, U.S.
- Listed height: 6 ft 2 in (1.88 m)
- Listed weight: 255 lb (116 kg)

Career information
- High school: Miami Sunset
- College: Miami Dade College; Kemper Military School; Oklahoma
- NFL draft: 2001: 3rd round, 72nd overall pick

Career history
- Green Bay Packers (2001–2004); Austin Wranglers (2006); Tampa Bay Storm (2007)

Awards and highlights
- BCS national champion (2000); Third-team All-American (2000); Second-team All-Big 12 (2000)

Career NFL statistics
- Tackles: 77
- Sacks: 1
- Fumble recoveries: 4
- Stats at Pro Football Reference

Career AFL statistics
- Tackles: 59
- Sacks: 3.5
- Fumble recoveries: 3
- Stats at ArenaFan.com

Torrance James Marshall (born June 12, 1977) is an American former professional football player who was a linebacker for the Green Bay Packers of the National Football League (NFL). He played high school football at Miami Sunset Senior High. He played college football for the Oklahoma Sooners and was the MVP of the 2001 Orange Bowl. He is the nephew of former NFL player Harvey Clayton.

== College ==
Marshall intended to spend his college playing career with the University of Miami, but was not accepted due to academic reasons. Instead, he attended Kemper Military School, where he had 198 tackles, and later Miami-Dade Community College. In 1999, he began attending the University of Oklahoma as a criminal justice major, and was co-captain of his football team for two consecutive seasons. He was a third-team All-American as a senior and finished second on the team in total tackles. He was named MVP of the 2001 Orange Bowl, in which the Sooners defeated the Florida State Seminoles to win the national championship for the 2000 season. He was also named MVP of the Senior Bowl.

== NFL career ==
Pre-draft measurables
Height	Weight
6 ft 2 in (1.88 m)	249 lb (113 kg)
Values from Pro Day

Marshall was drafted with the 72nd overall selection in the 2001 NFL draft by the Green Bay Packers in the third round. He spent most of his rookie season as a backup player as well as on special teams, totaling 20 tackles. He made his first start against the Tennessee Titans that season, replacing the injured Nate Wayne. During the 2002 season, he began seeing action at fullback as well as linebacker when starter William Henderson was battling injuries. He totaled 21 tackles on special teams that season.

Marshall was suspended for the first four games of the 2003 season for violating the substance abuse rules of the NFL. He began the season again as a backup in 2004 but was placed on injured reserve that season and was released at the end of the season.

== Arena Football League ==
After taking the 2005 season off, Marshall joined the Austin Wranglers of the Arena Football League as a fullback/linebacker. In his first season, he scored three touchdowns out of 18 rushing attempts and made twenty solo tackles. He then signed with the Tampa Bay Storm, where he set a franchise single-season rushing touchdown mark with 17 touchdowns on the ground.

== NFL career statistics ==
Legend
**Bold**	Career high

=== Regular season ===
Year	Team	Games		Tackles					Interceptions					Fumbles			
Year	Team	GP	GS	Cmb	Solo	Ast	Sck	TFL	Int	Yds	TD	Lng	PD	FF	FR	Yds	TD
2001	GNB	14	**1**	21	15	**6**	0.0	**2**	0	0	0	0	**1**	0	**1**	0	0
2002	GNB	**16**	0	18	14	4	0.0	0	0	0	0	0	0	0	**1**	0	0
2003	GNB	12	**1**	**27**	**21**	**6**	**1.0**	**2**	0	0	0	0	**1**	0	**1**	0	0
2004	GNB	9	0	11	10	1	0.0	0	0	0	0	0	0	0	**1**	0	0
		51	2	77	60	17	1.0	4	0	0	0	0	2	0	4	0	0

=== Playoffs ===
Year	Team	Games		Tackles					Interceptions					Fumbles			
Year	Team	GP	GS	Cmb	Solo	Ast	Sck	TFL	Int	Yds	TD	Lng	PD	FF	FR	Yds	TD
2001	GNB	**2**	0	0	0	0	0.0	0	0	0	0	0	0	0	0	0	0
2002	GNB	1	0	**1**	**1**	0	0.0	0	0	0	0	0	0	0	0	0	0
2003	GNB	**2**	0	0	0	0	0.0	0	0	0	0	0	0	0	0	0	0
		5	0	1	1	0	0.0	0	0	0	0	0	0	0	0	0	0

== See also ==
- List of Arena Football League and National Football League players
