= J'Marcus Webb =

American football player (born 1988)

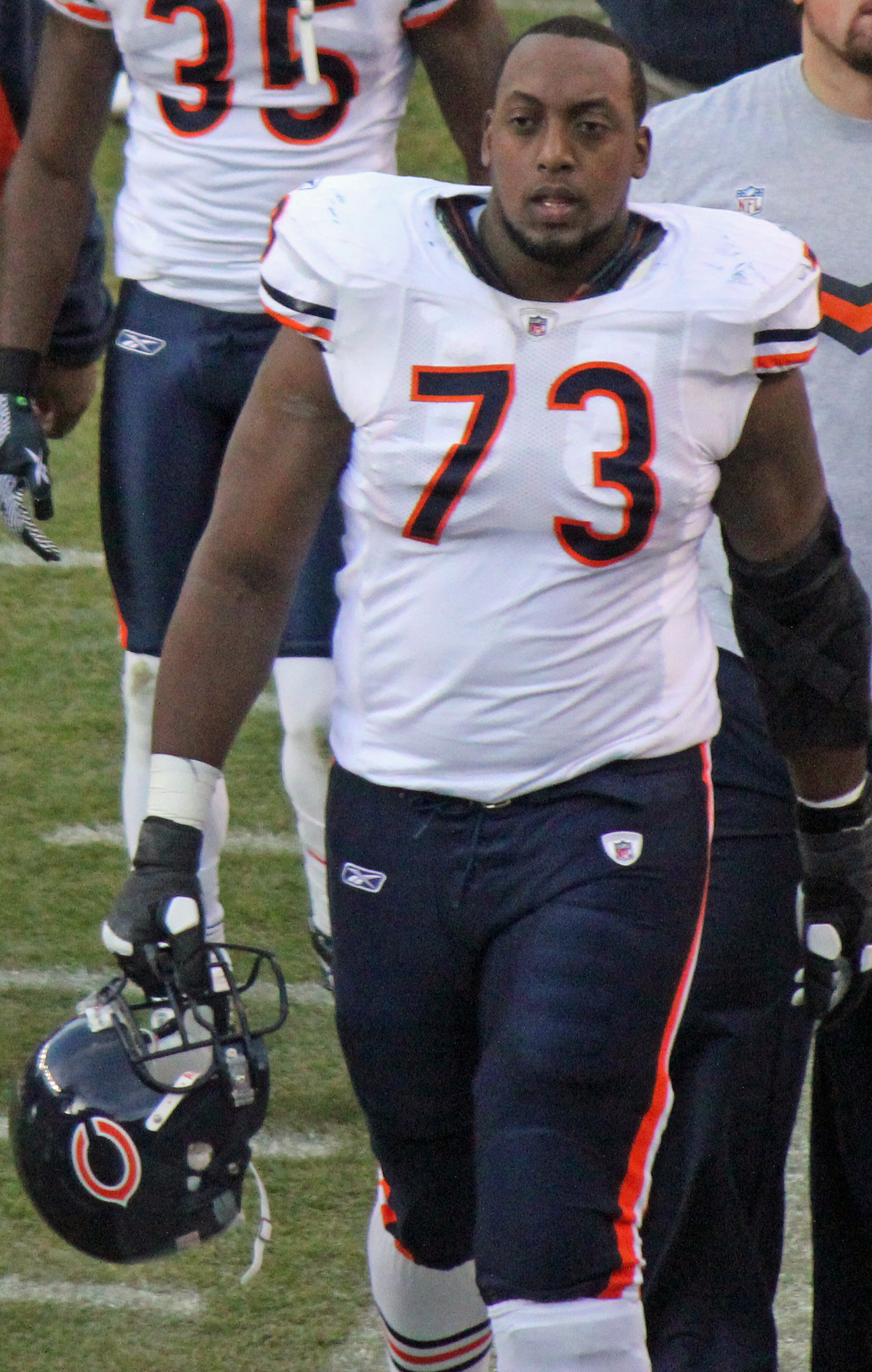
- Webb with the Chicago Bears in 2011

No. 73, 69, 76, 61
- Position: Offensive tackle

Personal information
- Born: August 8, 1988 (age 38); Fort Worth, Texas, U.S.
- Listed height: 6 ft 7 in (2.01 m)
- Listed weight: 320 lb (145 kg)

Career information
- High school: North Mesquite (Mesquite, Texas)
- College: Texas (2006); Navarro (2007); West Texas A&M (2008–2009)
- NFL draft: 2010: 7th round, 218th overall pick

Career history
- Chicago Bears (2010–2012); Minnesota Vikings (2013); Kansas City Chiefs (2014)*; Minnesota Vikings (2014); Oakland Raiders (2015); Seattle Seahawks (2016); Indianapolis Colts (2018); Miami Dolphins (2019); Indianapolis Colts (2020)
- * Offseason or practice squad member only

Awards and highlights
- First-team All-Southwest Junior College Football Conference (2007); First-team NJCAA All-American (2007)

Career NFL statistics
- Games played: 96
- Games started: 73
- Stats at Pro Football Reference

J'Marcus Webb (born August 8, 1988) is an American former professional football player who was an offensive tackle in the National Football League (NFL). He played college football for the West Texas A&M Buffaloes. He was selected by the Chicago Bears in the seventh round of the 2010 NFL draft.

Webb also played in the NFL for the Minnesota Vikings, Kansas City Chiefs, Oakland Raiders, Seattle Seahawks, Indianapolis Colts, and Miami Dolphins.

== Early life ==
Webb played football at North Mesquite High School in Mesquite, Texas.

== College career ==
In 2006, as a freshman, Webb played for the University of Texas Longhorns. The Longhorns went 10–3 and Webb played in the 2006 Alamo Bowl. In 2007, Webb transferred to Navarro College, and in 2008, he transferred to West Texas A&M University.

== Professional career ==
Pre-draft measurables
Height	Weight	40-yard dash	10-yard split	20-yard split	20-yard shuttle	Three-cone drill	Vertical jump	Broad jump	Bench press
6 ft 7 3/8 in (2.02 m)	328 lb (149 kg)	5.28 s	1.76 s	2.93 s	4.80 s	7.82 s	26 in (0.66 m)	8 ft 5 in (2.57 m)	17 reps
All values from NFL Combine

=== Chicago Bears ===
Webb was selected in the seventh round (218th pick overall) of the 2010 NFL draft by the Chicago Bears. On May 16, 2010, Webb agreed to a four-year deal with the Bears.

In 2012, Webb was listed as the starting left tackle ahead of Chris Williams. In 2013, after the Bears signed Jermon Bushrod, Webb shifted to right tackle. On August 30, 2013, Webb was placed on waivers by the Bears.

=== Minnesota Vikings ===
On September 1, 2013, Webb was claimed off waivers by the Minnesota Vikings. On December 17, 2013, he was waived by the Minnesota Vikings.

=== Kansas City Chiefs ===
On May 19, 2014, Webb was signed by the Kansas City Chiefs. He was released on August 30, 2014.

=== Oakland Raiders ===
On April 2, 2015, Webb signed a one-year, $745,000 free agent contract with the Oakland Raiders.

=== Seattle Seahawks ===
On March 15, 2016, the Seattle Seahawks signed Webb to a two-year, $5.75 million free agent contract that includes $2.45 million guaranteed and a signing bonus of $1.20 million. Webb was slated to be the starting right tackle but suffered a knee injury and was replaced by Garry Gilliam. He was released by the Seahawks on November 22, 2016.

Webb was suspended the first four games of the 2017 season on January 21, 2017.

=== Indianapolis Colts (first stint) ===
On July 30, 2018, Webb signed with the Indianapolis Colts. Webb started Week 1 at right tackle but sustained a hamstring injury and was placed on injured reserve on September 11, 2018.

On April 5, 2019, Webb re-signed with the Colts. He was released during final roster cuts on August 31, 2019.

=== Miami Dolphins ===
On September 6, 2019, Webb was signed by the Miami Dolphins.

=== Indianapolis Colts (second stint) ===
On December 12, 2020, Webb was signed to the Indianapolis Colts' practice squad. He was elevated to the active roster on December 26 for the team's week 16 game against the Pittsburgh Steelers, and reverted to the practice squad after the game. His practice squad contract with the team expired after the season on January 18, 2021.
