= Brian Odom =

American football coach (born 1981)

Current position
- Title: Inside linebackers coach
- Team: Washington
- Conference: Big Ten

Biographical details
- Born: July 2, 1981 (age 45)
- Education: Southeastern Oklahoma State University (2004)

Playing career
- 2000–2001: Oklahoma
- 2002–2004: Southeastern Oklahoma State
- Position: Running back/Tailback

Coaching career (HC unless noted)
- 2005: Missouri (DGA)
- 2005–2011: Arizona (DPE)
- 2012–2014: Houston (co-DSP)
- 2015–2016: Washington State (DQC)
- 2017–2018: Missouri (OLB)
- 2019–2021: Oklahoma (ILB)
- 2022–2023: USC (co-DC/ILB)
- 2024: North Texas (LB)
- 2025–present: Washington (ILB)

Accomplishments and honors

Championships
- BCS national champion (2000)

Brian Odom (born July 2, 1981) is an American football coach who is the inside linebackers coach for the Washington Huskies. He was previously the co-defensive coordinator and linebackers coach for the USC Trojans from 2021 to 2023 and the linebackers coach for the North Texas Mean Green in 2024.

== Early career ==
Odom played at Ada High School in Ada, Oklahoma, where he was Oklahoma's High School Player of the Year in 1999 as a running back.

He first played college football at Oklahoma for two seasons where he was redshirted during the 2000 season when the team became national champions. He lettered in 2001 playing primarily on special teams.

He would transfer to play at Southeastern Oklahoma State where he was a three year starting tailback from 2002 to 2004. He earned the first team all-Lone Star Conference honor as a senior in 2004 and would graduate and earn his bachelor degree that same year.

== Coaching career ==
Odom started his coaching career as an administrative and defensive graduate assistant for Missouri in the first half of 2005.

He then spent seven years as the assistant director of performance enhancement for Arizona from 2005 to 2006 and as an associate director of performance enhancement from 2007 to 2011.

He spent three years as the co-director of sports performance at Houston from 2012 to 2014.

He was a defensive quality control assistant at Washington State from 2015 to 2016.

On February 3, 2017, Odom returned to Missouri and was hired as the outside linebackers coach. He spent two years in that position from 2017 to 2018.

On January 16, 2019, Odom was hired as the inside linebackers coach at Oklahoma. He spent three years in this position from 2019 to 2021 and also served as the interim defensive coordinator at the end of 2021.

On January 10, 2022, Odom was hired as the inside linebackers coach and associate head coach for defense at USC as part of Lincoln Riley's new coaching staff. He served these positions from 2022 to 2023. He also served as the interim co-defensive coordinator for three games in 2023.

On February 20, 2024, Odom was named as the linebackers coach at North Texas.

On November 16, 2024, Odom was named interim defensive coordinator for the North Texas Mean Green, upon the firing of Matt Caponi.

On February 15, 2025, Odom was named as the linebackers coach at Washington.

== Personal life ==
Odom is the younger brother of current Purdue head coach, Barry Odom.
