= Episcopal High School (Bellaire, Texas) =

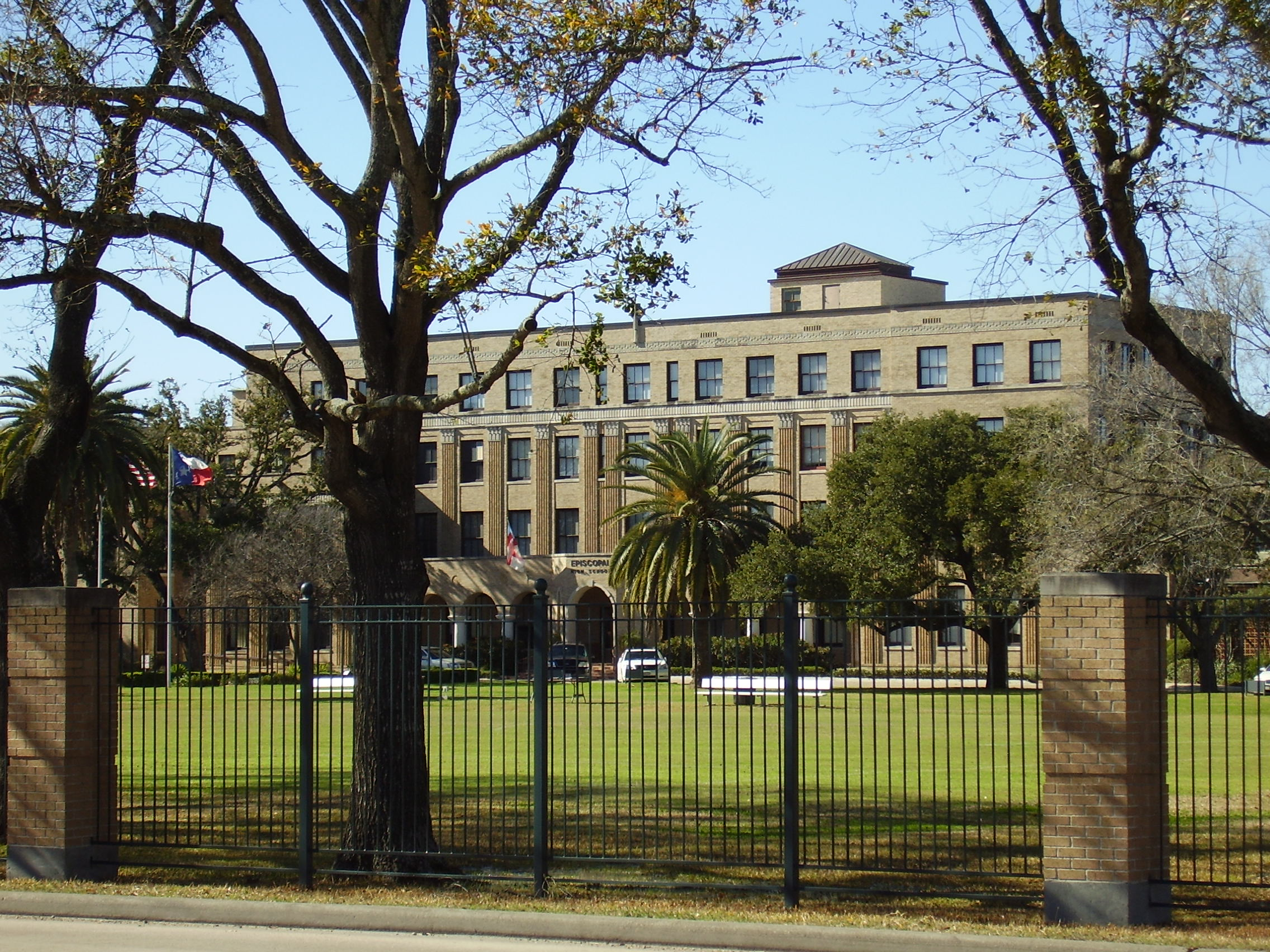

Location
- 4650 Bissonnet Street; Bellaire, Texas 77401; United States; 29.714854°N 95.457597°W

Information
- Type: Private
- Established: 1983
- Locale: Suburban
- Head teacher: Edward (Ned) Smith
- Teaching staff: 101.0 (on an FTE basis)
- Grades: 9th grade - 12th grade
- Enrollment: 797 (2020–21)
- Student to teacher ratio: 7.9
- Colors: Blue and White
- Athletics: Southwest Preparatory Conference
- Mascot: Knight
- Website: www.ehshouston.org

Episcopal High School is a four-year co-educational private day school located on a 34-acre (140,000 m^{2}) campus in Bellaire, Texas, United States, in Greater Houston. It was founded in 1983, and had an enrollment of 797 students in the 2021–2022 school year.

== History ==
Founded in 1983 by a group of Houston business and Episcopal Church leaders, the school opened in fall 1984 with 150 students in grades nine and ten. The founders, led by The Rt. Rev. Maurice M. Benitez, established the school as an institution of the Diocese. The founding headmaster, Rev. Warren R. "Jess" Borg, served until 1995, when Edward C. "Ned" Becker was appointed the second Head of School. After Ned Becker retired in 2007, he was replaced by C. Edward "Ned" Smith as the third Head of School.

A complete campus, with buildings in need of extensive repair, was purchased in 1983 from Houston developer Wayne Duddlesten, who had purchased the 34-acre (140,000 m^{2}) site from the Sisters of the Incarnate Word and Blessed Sacrament. Formerly housing the Marian High School and the Congregation of the Sisters of the Incarnate Word and Blessed Sacrament, a convent and a co-ed high school, the property had been vacant for several years before Duddlesten purchased it. Duddlesten sold the building to the developers of the school.

In 2008, the school planned an expansion worth $50 million. It sought approval from the Bellaire city government.

In 2012, the Jack T. Trotter Academic & Sciences Building was opened. The two-story, 78,000-square-foot (7,200 m^{2}) building contains 23 classrooms including 12 science labs and a performing arts lobby.

In 2017, the Hildebrand Athletic Center was opened. The 67,061 sq ft building supports year-round athletics programs. It includes a 6,800 sq ft weight room, cheer/wrestling room, trophy hallway, and a 4,500 sq ft alumni room with a 1,000 sq ft terrace. It is also home to the Alkek Gym, which is the largest gym in the Southwest Preparatory Conference, holding 1500 spectators.

In November 2018, the new Underwood Student Center opened. The more than 30,000‑square‑foot building has a dining hall on the first floor with seating for 500, a renovated kitchen and servery, a stage, drop‑down video screen, surround sound, Forrest Place coffee bar, and a glass‑walled art gallery.

== Academics ==
Students may choose from more than 125 courses, including honors-level and Advanced Placement courses.

Episcopal's language program offers Spanish, French, Chinese, and Latin language and culture. Episcopal's mathematics department teaches classes from algebra 1 to AP Statistics. Episcopal's science department, utilizing the labs in the Jack T. Trotter Building, teaches students to analyze data and conduct experiments to better understand the physical world.

== Athletics ==
The school offers courses in health education, physical education, wellness, strength and conditioning, and athletic training. The sports program fields 46 teams in 15 sports over three seasons during the school year. These sports are: Football, Volleyball, Cross Country, Field Hockey, Cheerleading, Basketball, Soccer, Wrestling, Swimming, Baseball, Golf, Lacrosse, Tennis, Track & Field, and Softball. More than 75% of the students participate in at least one sport.

EHS has been a member of the Southwest Preparatory Conference (SPC) since 1987. Episcopal was a TAPPS (Note: Known as the Texas Association of Private Schools (T.A.P.S.) until 1991) institution prior to the 1987-88 school year.

=== Athletic championships ===
Championship was a Southwest Preparatory Conference (SPC) championship unless otherwise stated.

Sport	Championship years
Baseball	1987 (TAPPS), 1990, 1992, 1993, 1995, 1996, 1998, 2005, 2010, 2011, 2012, 2013, 2017, 2018, 2021, 2023
Boys Basketball	1995, 1996, 2013, 2022, 2024
Girls Basketball	1988, 2024
Girls Cross Country	2021, 2022, 2023
Football	1991, 1992, 1993, 2009, 2012, 2014, 2019, 2023
Boys Golf	1987 (TAPPS), 1988, 2007, 2008, 2009
Girls Golf	2016
Boys Lacrosse	1991 (SPC & Statewide), 1992 (Statewide), 1993, 2003
Softball	1990, 1991, 1993, 1995, 1997, 1998, 1999, 2000, 2002, 2004, 2005, 2006, 2007, 2014, 2015, 2017, 2018, 2019, 2021, 2022, 2023, 2024, 2025
Boys Track & Field	1991, 1992, 1993, 2013, 2014, 2015, 2023, 2024, 2025
Girls Track & Field	1991, 1992, 1998, 2008, 2009, 2021, 2024, 2025
Girls Volleyball	1989, 1992, 1993, 1994, 1995, 1996, 1997, 1998, 2017, 2019, 2022
Boys Volleyball	2023, 2025
Boys Winter Soccer	1992, 2016, 2017, 2018, 2019, 2023, 2024, 2025
Girls Winter Soccer	2024

Main Source:

== Notable alumni ==
- Donovan Jackson (Class of 2021), college football offensive guard for the Ohio State Buckeyes, and selected 24th overall by the Minnesota Vikings
- Jaylen Waddle (Class of 2018), Wide Receiver drafted sixth overall by for the Miami Dolphins in the 2021 NFL draft
- Walker Little (Class of 2017), Offensive tackle drafted 45th overall by the Jacksonville Jaguars in the 2021 NFL Draft
- Marvin Wilson (Class of 2017), Defensive tackle for the Cleveland Browns and Philadelphia Eagles
- Amir Taghi (Class of 2015), Fashion designer
- Shane Carden (Class of 2010), Quarterback for the East Carolina Pirates and Chicago Bears
- Stephanie Styles (Class of 2010), American Broadway and Hollywood actress, singer, and dancer
- Becky Bereswill (Class of 2009), American figure skater
- Mark Hamilton (Class of 2003), First Base and Outfield St. Louis Cardinals (2010–2011)
- Daniel Loper (Class of 2000), Offensive Lineman for the Tennessee Titans, Detroit Lions, Oakland Raiders, and Dallas Cowboys
- Spergon Wynn (Class of 1996), Professional Quarterback in NFL NFL Europe CFL
- Andrew Friedman (Class of 1995), President of Baseball Operations of the Major League Baseball (MLB) Los Angeles Dodgers, former GM of Tampa Bay Rays
- Dena Dubal (Class of 1992), Neuroscientist and physician at the University of California, San Francisco
- DeAndre Jordan, NBA player
- Helena Moreno (Class of 1995), Mayor of New Orleans (2026-present), president of the New Orleans City Council and First Division Councilmember-at-Large, realtor and equestrian
- Tanner Witt (2020), baseball player
- Trei Cruz (Class of 2017), Outfielder Major League Baseball (MLB)

== See also ==
- Christianity in Houston
