= Daniel Loper =

American football player (born 1982)

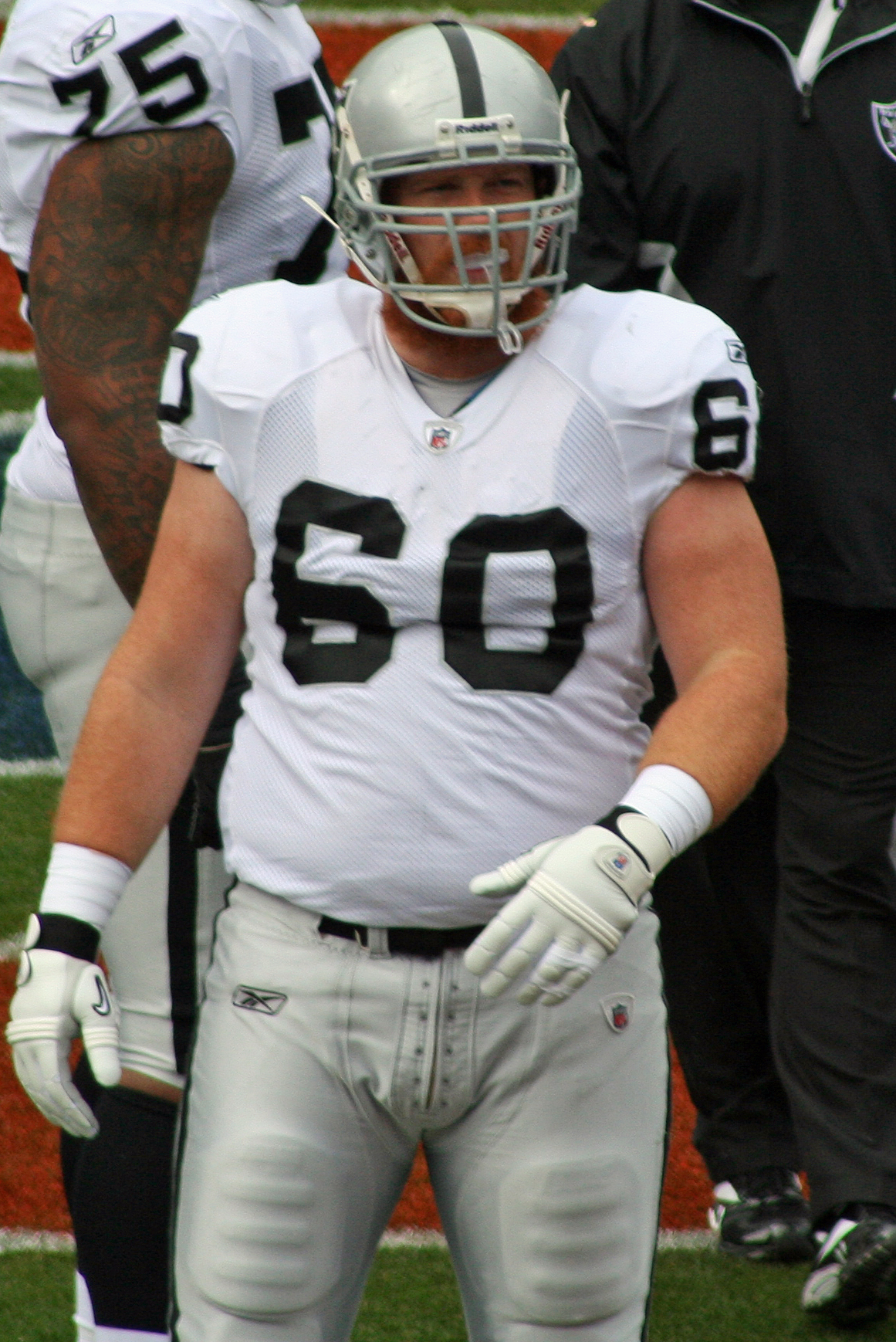
- Loper with the Oakland Raiders in 2010

No. 70, 60
- Position: Guard

Personal information
- Born: January 15, 1982 (age 44); Houston, Texas, U.S.
- Listed height: 6 ft 6 in (1.98 m)
- Listed weight: 320 lb (145 kg)

Career information
- High school: Episcopal (Houston)
- College: Texas Tech
- NFL draft: 2005: 5th round, 150th overall pick

Career history
- Tennessee Titans (2005–2008); Detroit Lions (2009); Oakland Raiders (2010); Dallas Cowboys (2011)

Awards and highlights
- 2× Second-team All-Big 12 (2003, 2004); Third-team All-Big 12 (2002)

Career NFL statistics
- Games played: 58
- Games started: 9
- Fumble recoveries: 2
- Stats at Pro Football Reference

Daniel Robert Loper (born January 15, 1982) is an American former professional football player who was a guard in the National Football League (NFL). He played college football for the Texas Tech Red Raiders and was selected by the Tennessee Titans in the fifth round of the 2005 NFL draft.

== Early life ==
He played high school football at Episcopal High School in Houston, Texas.

== Professional career ==
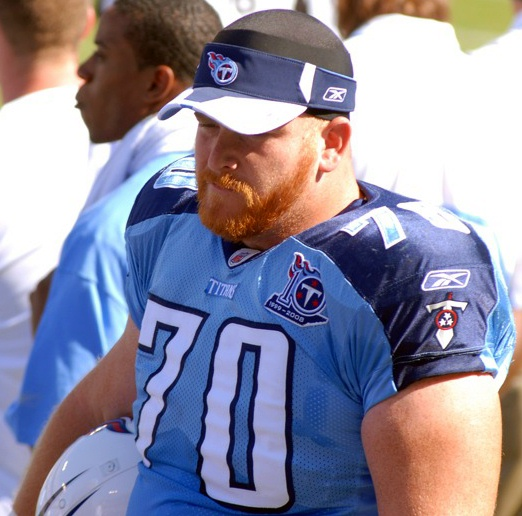
While with the Titans

=== Tennessee Titans ===
Loper was selected by the Tennessee Titans in the fifth round with the 150th overall pick in the 2005 NFL draft.

=== Detroit Lions ===
Loper was signed by the Detroit Lions as a free agent prior to the 2009 season.

Loper was released by the Lions on April 15, 2010.

=== Oakland Raiders ===
Loper signed with the Oakland Raiders on May 16, 2010.

=== Dallas Cowboys ===
Loper was signed by the Dallas Cowboys on October 18, 2011. In December 2011, he was released. He was re-signed on August 3, 2012. Loper was released on September 1, 2012, with an injury settlement.
