= Andre Woolfolk =

American football player (born 1980)

No. 26
- Position: Cornerback

Personal information
- Born: January 26, 1980 (age 46); Denver, Colorado, U.S.
- Listed height: 6 ft 1 in (1.85 m)
- Listed weight: 197 lb (89 kg)

Career information
- High school: Denver (CO) Jefferson
- College: Oklahoma
- NFL draft: 2003: 1st round, 28th overall pick

Career history
- Tennessee Titans (2003–2006); New York Jets (2008)*
- * Offseason or practice squad member only

Awards and highlights
- BCS national champion (2000); 2× Third-team All-Big 12 (2000, 2001)

Career NFL statistics
- Total tackles: 136
- Forced fumbles: 1
- Fumble recoveries: 1
- Pass deflections: 18
- Interceptions: 3
- Stats at Pro Football Reference

Andre Maurice Woolfolk (born January 26, 1980) is an American former professional football player who was a cornerback in the National Football League (NFL) for the Tennessee Titans. He was selected by the Titans in the first round of the 2003 NFL draft after playing college football at Oklahoma. Woolfolk was also an offseason member of the New York Jets.

== Early life ==
A native of Denver, he attended Thomas Jefferson High School, where he played for the football team and was teammates with Daniel Graham Woolfolk recorded 171 tackles and 19 interceptions in high school.

== College career ==
Woolfolk played college football for the Oklahoma from 1998 to 2002. He redshirted in 1998. He played both wide receiver and defensive back for the Sooners. As a receiver, Woolfolk caught 11 passes for 129 yards and one touchdown in 1999, 39 passes for 573 yards and five touchdowns in 2000, and six passes for 134 yards in 2001. Woolfolk switched to defensive back full-time after the fifth game of the 2001 season. He earned third-team All-Big 12 honors in 2000 and 2001 and was also a member of the Oklahoma team that won the national championship in 2000.

== Professional career ==
=== Tennessee Titans ===
Woolfolk was selected by the Tennessee Titans in the first round, with the 28th overall pick, of the 2003 NFL draft. He officially signed with the team on July 25, 2003. He played in six games, starting two, for the Titans during his rookie year in 2003, recording 18 solo tackles, five assisted tackles, one interception and five pass breakups. He was placed on injured reserve on December 23, 2003. Woolfolk appeared in 10 games, starting two, in 2004, totaling 42 solo tackles, seven assisted tackles, one interception and six pass breakups. He was placed on injured reserve for the second consecutive year on December 31, 2004. He played in 13 games, starting seven, for the Titans during the 2005 season, accumulating 42 solo tackles, 13 assisted tackles, one interception, seven pass breakups, one forced fumble and one fumble recovery. Woolfolk appeared in 10 games, starting one, in 2006, recording six solo tackles and three assisted tackles.

He was placed on injured reserve for the third time on August 14, 2007, and was released by the Titans on August 23, 2007. Overall, he played in 39 games, starting 12, during his NFL career, totaling 108 solo tackles, 28 assisted tackles, three interceptions, 18 pass breakups, one forced fumble and one fumble recovery. All three of his interceptions were thrown by David Carr.

=== New York Jets ===
Woolfolk signed with the New York Jets on March 4, 2008, but was released on July 30, 2008.

In 2021, The New York Times named Woolfolk the biggest draft bust ever chosen with the 28th overall pick.

== Personal life ==
He is a cousin of Butch Woolfolk.
