= Mike Rivera (American football) =

American football player (born 1986)

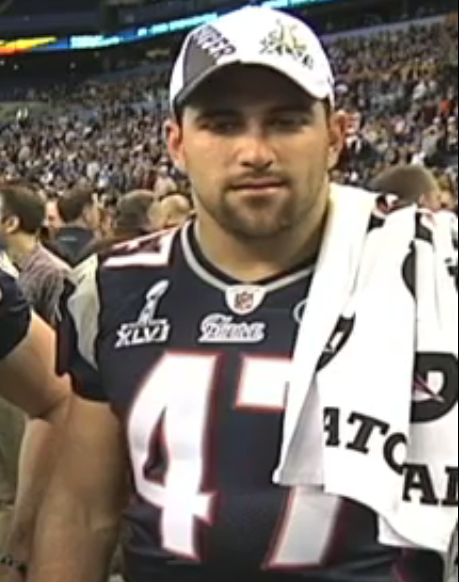
- Rivera at Super Bowl XLVI media day

No. 57, 47, 59, 52
- Position: Linebacker / Tight end

Personal information
- Born: January 10, 1986 (age 40); Shawnee, Kansas, U.S.
- Listed height: 6 ft 2 in (1.88 m)
- Listed weight: 252 lb (114 kg)

Career information
- High school: Shawnee Mission Northwest
- College: Kansas
- NFL draft: 2009: undrafted

Career history
- Chicago Bears (2009)*; Tennessee Titans (2009–2010)*; Green Bay Packers (2010)*; Miami Dolphins (2010); New England Patriots (2011-2012); Miami Dolphins (2012); New England Patriots (2012)
- * Offseason or practice squad member only

Career NFL statistics
- Total tackles: 9
- Stats at Pro Football Reference

Mike Rivera (born January 10, 1986) is an American former professional football player who was a linebacker and tight end in the National Football League (NFL). He played college football for the Kansas Jayhawks.

== Professional career ==
=== Chicago Bears ===
After going undrafted in the 2009 NFL draft, Rivera signed with the Chicago Bears as an undrafted free agent on April 26, 2009. He was cut on September 5, 2009.

=== Tennessee Titans ===
On September 7, 2009, the Tennessee Titans signed Rivera to their practice squad. He was signed to a future contract with the Titans after the 2009 season on January 4, 2010. He was waived on August 31, 2010.

=== Green Bay Packers ===
Rivera was signed to the Green Bay Packers' practice squad on October 13, 2010.

=== Miami Dolphins (first stint) ===
The Miami Dolphins signed Rivera off the Packers' practice squad on December 28, 2010. Rivera was released by the Dolphins in August 2011.

=== New England Patriots (first stint) ===
The New England Patriots signed Rivera to the practice squad on November 9, 2011. Rivera signed a future contract with the Patriots on February 8, 2012.

=== Miami Dolphins (second stint) ===
The Dolphins signed Rivera on September 25, 2012. He was waived on October 2, 2012.

=== New England Patriots (second stint) ===
The Patriots signed Rivera on October 31, 2012. He was waived on August 30, 2013.
