= Derrick Strait =

American gridiron football player (born 1980)

No. 21, 22, 20, 25
- Position: Cornerback

Personal information
- Born: August 27, 1980 (age 46); Austin, Texas, U.S.
- Listed height: 5 ft 11 in (1.80 m)
- Listed weight: 189 lb (86 kg)

Career information
- High school: Lanier (Austin)
- College: Oklahoma
- NFL draft: 2004: 3rd round, 76th overall pick

Career history
- New York Jets (2004–2006); Tampa Bay Buccaneers (2006); Chicago Bears (2006); Carolina Panthers (2006); Columbus Destroyers (2008)*; Edmonton Eskimos (2008)*; Winnipeg Blue Bombers (2009)*
- * Offseason or practice squad member only

Awards and highlights
- BCS national champion (2000); Jim Thorpe Award (2003); Bronko Nagurski Trophy (2003); Unanimous All-American (2003); Second-team All-American (2002); 2× First-team All-Big 12 (2002, 2003)

Career NFL statistics
- Total tackles: 71
- Fumble recoveries: 1
- Pass deflections: 1
- Stats at Pro Football Reference

Derrick Lee Strait (born August 27, 1980) is an American former professional football player who was a cornerback for three seasons in the National Football League (NFL) during the early 2000s. He played college football for the Oklahoma Sooners, earning unanimous All-American honors in 2003. The New York Jets chose him in the third round of the 2004 NFL draft, and he also played professionally for the Chicago Bears and Carolina Panthers of the NFL.

== Early life ==
Strait was born in Austin, Texas. He attended Lanier High School in Austin, playing football for coach and former University of Texas player Wade Johnson. While in high school, Strait was selected to the Texas Top 100 by the Houston Chronicle and a Max Emfinger National Top 500 selection. Strait saw action as a quarterback, defensive back and running back during his senior season, where he rushed for 1,439 yards and 17 touchdowns, recording eight runs of 20 or more yards, including one of 81 yards and also threw three touchdowns. He also had, 118 tackles (52 solos), one quarterback sack, two forced fumbles, four fumble recoveries, 11 pass deflections and two interceptions on defense. He returned one fumble 42 yards for a touchdown. Strait combined for more than 1,500 yards as a junior (790 passing and 712 rushing). He was an All-District standout as well as being selected to the All-CenTex team.

== College career ==
Strait received an athletic scholarship to attend the University of Oklahoma, and played for coach Bob Stoops's Oklahoma Sooners football team from 2000 to 2003. He was a starter at the cornerback position all four years. Derrick was a two-time All-American, recipient of the 2003 Bronko Nagurski Trophy, and the 2003 Jim Thorpe Award after his senior season. He holds a team record with five fumble recoveries in a single season. He was named to the Sports Illustrated All-Decade Team in 2009.

=== Freshman (2000) ===
In 2000, Strait was selected as the Big 12 Conference Defensive Newcomer of the Year by the Associated Press, Freshman All-America selection by The Sporting News, a third-team All-Big 12 selection by the Big 12 Coaches. Strait started every game at right cornerback and finished his first season fourth in tackles with 62. He also recorded five tackles for loss, two sacks and 15 pass deflections. He recorded the second most deflections on the team and fourth most for an Oklahoma defensive back in a single season. Strait recorded one of his biggest deflections late in the Oklahoma State game when he broke up a pass in the end zone on fourth and goal, which helped Oklahoma secure the victory. Strait also had another key breakup in the Orange Bowl against Florida State, with he deflected a possible touchdown pass in the fourth quarter, he also had five tackles in the game. Strait had a pair of interceptions, including a third quarter pick against Nebraska which he returned 32 yards for a touchdown, he was also one of five Sooners to return an interception for a touchdown. He recorded a career-high 10 tackles against Texas. He also recorded five tackles, two tackles for loss and one sack a week later at Kansas State. Strait also had seven tackles and an interception in the final home game of the year against Texas Tech.

=== Sophomore (2001) ===
In 2001, Strait was an All-Big 12 Second-team selection by the Associated Press. He was also an All-Big 12 Honorable Mention selection by the Big 12 Coaches. Strait emerged as one of the better cover corners in the country. He recorded a season high nine tackles at Nebraska. Strait had at least three tackles in 11 of the 12 regular season games. Strait had eight tackles against Texas. He returned an interception 47 yards for a touchdown in the season opener against North Carolina, cutting across the field in almost an exact replay of his TD against Nebraska the previous year. Strait did however give up the winning touchdown in the 2001 Bedlam Series against Oklahoma State to Rashaun Woods, unable to perform his game-saving magic of a year ago.

=== Junior (2002) ===
In 2002, Strait was a Jim Thorpe Award semifinalist, consensus All-Big 12 first-team. He started every game at cornerback. He tied for the team lead with six interceptions, the No. 10 total in school history, and set a school record for return yards in a season by taking his six interceptions back for 175 yards. Strait had two interceptions at Baylor which he returned for a school record 127 yards, one for a 75-yard touchdown. Strait had a total of 175 interception return yards for the season rank third on the team. Strait had a season high eight tackles at Texas A&M.

=== Senior (2003) ===
Following his 2003 senior season, Strait won the Bronko Nagurski Trophy, and the Jim Thorpe Award, and was recognized as a unanimous first-team All-American.

On February 9, 2004, state senator Debbe Leftwich, praised Strait on the Oklahoma Senate floor when she presented him with Senate Resolution 36.

== Professional career ==
=== National Football League ===
Pre-draft measurables
Height	Weight	Arm length	Hand span	40-yard dash	20-yard shuttle	Three-cone drill	Vertical jump	Broad jump
5 ft 11 1/8 in (1.81 m)	196 lb (89 kg)	31 1/4 in (0.79 m)	9 1/8 in (0.23 m)	4.52 s	4.10 s	6.65 s	35.5 in (0.90 m)	9 ft 11 in (3.02 m)
All values from NFL Combine/Pro Day

Strait was selected with the 13th pick in the third round of the 2004 NFL draft by the New York Jets. After spending two seasons primarily as a backup defensive back, Strait was traded to the Cleveland Browns on August 14, 2006, for running back Lee Suggs. Suggs, however, failed his physical, and both he and Strait returned to their respective teams. On October 11, 2006, he was claimed off waivers by the Tampa Bay Buccaneers, but was released a week later. On November 8, 2006, he was claimed off waivers by the Chicago Bears. On December 9, 2006, he was released by the Bears. On December 11, 2006, he was claimed off waivers by the Carolina Panthers. On September 1, 2007, he did not make the final cut down, and was released by the Panthers.

=== Arena Football League ===
In 2008, Strait joined the Columbus Destroyers of the Arena Football League. However, he was waived on February 13.

=== Canadian Football League ===
On March 4, 2008, Strait signed with the Edmonton Eskimos.

On March 6, 2009, he was signed by the Winnipeg Blue Bombers but was released at the beginning of training camp.

== Coaching career ==
In March 2012, he began his college coaching career as a graduate assistant for his alma mater, the University of Oklahoma, under head coach Bob Stoops.

== See also ==
- List of Arena Football League and National Football League players
