= Jonathan Jackson (defensive end) =

American football player (born 1982)

Jonathan Jackson (born October 17, 1982) is an American football defensive end who formerly played for the Dallas Desperados in the Arena Football League. Jackson is from Houston, Texas, attended North Shore High School (Class of 2001) and played college football for the University of Oklahoma Sooners. He was signed in 2005 by the Chicago Bears as an undrafted rookie free-agent, but was released during training camp. He was claimed off waivers by the Tennessee Titans, but was released before the start of the 2005 NFL season. In 2006, he was signed by the Atlanta Falcons, but was again released before ever starting a game.

In 2007, he was signed by the Dallas Desperados of the Arena Football League, and assigned to their practice squad. He started one game for the Desperados, and was released by them in July 2007.
