= 2001 Orange Bowl =

College football bowl game and BCS National Championship

- BCS National Championship Game; 67th Orange Bowl
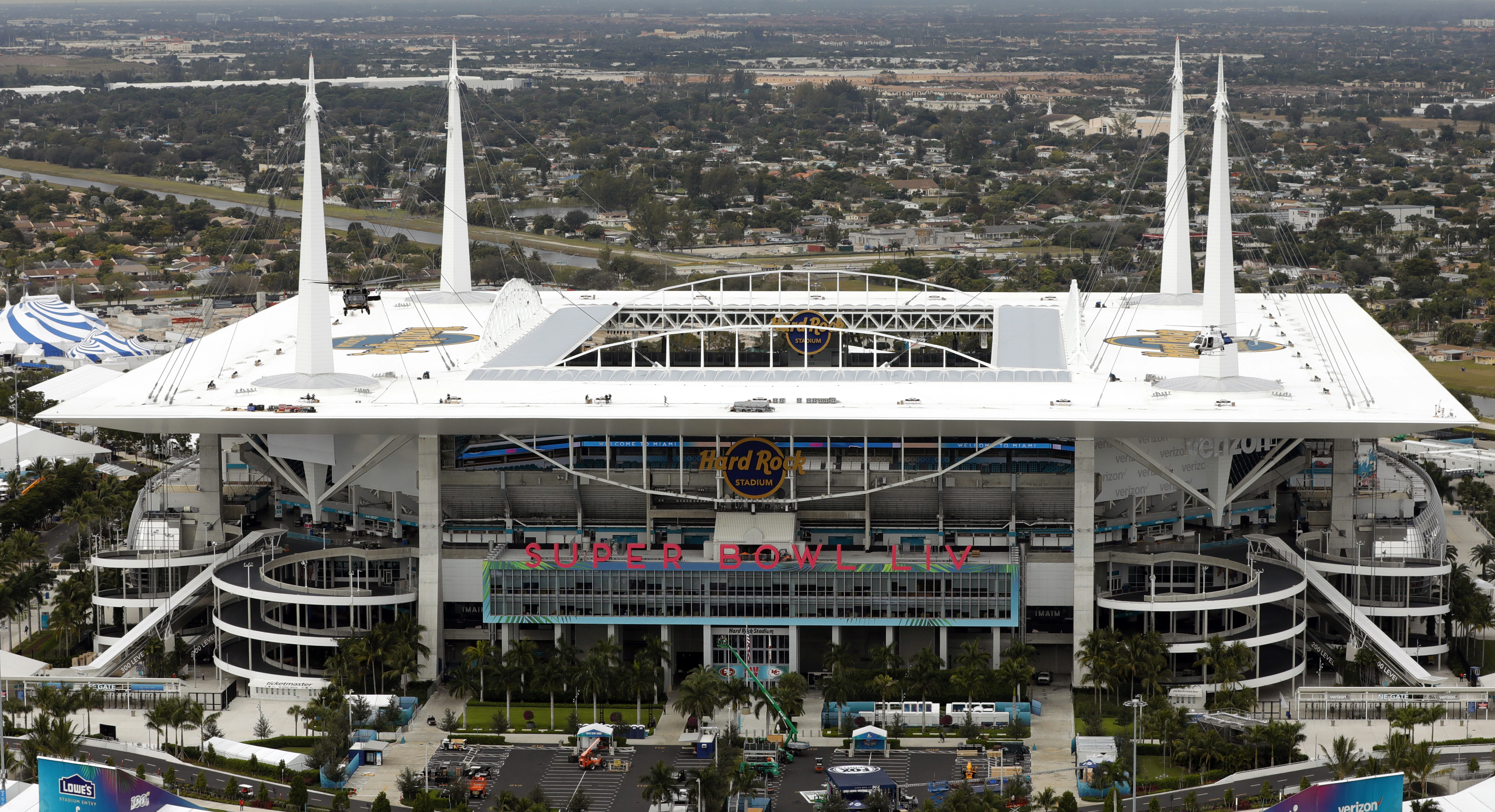
- Pro Player Stadium in Miami, Florida, hosted the Orange Bowl.
Florida State Seminoles	Oklahoma Sooners
(11–1)	(12–0)
ACC	Big 12
2	13
Head coach: Bobby Bowden	Head coach: Bob Stoops
AP / Coaches / BCS; 3 / 3 / 2	AP / Coaches / BCS; 1 / 1 / 1
	1	2	3	4	Total
Florida State	0	0	0	2	2
Oklahoma	3	0	3	7	13
- Date: January 3, 2001
- Season: 2000
- Stadium: Pro Player Stadium
- Location: Miami Gardens, Florida
- MVP: Oklahoma LB Torrance Marshall
- Favorite: Florida State by 11.5 (56.5)
- National anthem: Toby Keith
- Referee: Dick Honig (Big Ten)
- Attendance: 76,835

United States TV coverage
- Network: ABC
- Announcers: Brad Nessler (play-by-play); Bob Griese (color); Lynn Swann (sideline)
- Nielsen ratings: 17.8

The 2001 Orange Bowl, designated as the BCS National Championship Game, was a college football bowl game played to determine a national champion in the National Collegiate Athletic Association's Division I Football Bowl Subdivision (FBS) for the 2000 season. It was played at Pro Player Stadium in Miami Gardens, Florida, on January 3, 2001, with kickoff at 8:00 p.m. EST and television coverage by ABC. The 67th playing of the Orange Bowl, it was the culminating game of the 2000–01 bowl season.

The championship featured the top-ranked Oklahoma Sooners from the Big 12 Conference defeating the second-ranked and defending national champion Florida State Seminoles from the Atlantic Coast Conference in a defensive battle, 13–2. This was the first of only two times where a team failed to score a touchdown in the BCS National Championship, with the other being in 2012. The win gave Oklahoma head coach Bob Stoops his first and only national championship, in just his second season as the coach of the Sooners.

== Teams ==
The game featured No. 1 Oklahoma and No. 2 Florida State. The teams had previously met four times, with Oklahoma holding a 3–1 edge. Their most recent meeting had been in the 1981 Orange Bowl, which was won by Oklahoma, 18–17.

=== Florida State ===
Defending champion Florida State entered the National Championship game with an 11–1 record, having clinched the conference title winning all 8 of their Atlantic Coast Conference (ACC) regular season games while losing only to in-state rival Miami. Florida State had appeared in both prior BCS National Championship games, having lost the inaugural edition 1999 Fiesta Bowl and winning the 2000 Sugar Bowl.

=== Oklahoma ===
Oklahoma entered the National Championship game with a 12–0 record, having won all eight of their Big 12 Conference regular season games, followed by a win over Kansas State in the Big 12 Championship Game. This was Oklahoma's first BCS National Championship game appearance.

== Game summary ==
The only points scored in the first half came after the two teams exchanged turnovers on consecutive plays, which both occurred on the Oklahoma side of the field. First, Sooners receiver Andre Woolfolk fumbled after a 22-yard reception, with Clevan Thomas recovering at the Oklahoma 47. Then, a pass by Florida State quarterback Chris Weinke was intercepted by Torrance Marshall, which eventually led to a 27-yard field goal 7:44 into the game.

On the Sooners' next possession, an interception by Josh Heupel — the Sooners' second and final turnover of the night — did not lead to any Florida State points.

Between the 7:45 mark of the second quarter and the 8:05 mark of the third, the closest each team came to scoring was on a missed field goal. Oklahoma kicker Tim Duncan would then be successful on his next attempt, giving the Sooners a 6–0 lead with 4:24 left in the third quarter.

Throughout the second half, Florida State sustained some drives, but never made it to Oklahoma's red zone. Early in the fourth quarter, however, the Seminoles had at least two shots at a game-tying touchdown (and go-ahead extra-point) on plays that started on the OU 35-yard line. Facing 2nd-and-10 and 4th-and-10, Weinke twice threw deep passes towards the end zone. On second down, Robert Morgan "laid out beautifully" in the end zone, making a diving effort, but had the ball go "through his hands." Then, on fourth down, Weinke aimed for Anquan Boldin inside the Oklahoma 5-yard line, but the play was broken up by freshman Derrick Strait, who had also been the defender covering the aforementioned play.

Five minutes later, however, Oklahoma extended its lead, scoring the only touchdown of the game. The play was set up by the Sooners' defense recovering a fumble by Weinke, who was running for a first down at around the Seminoles' 15-yard line. Two plays later, OU running back Quentin Griffin ran the ball in to put the Sooners up 12–0 (13–0 after the extra-point) with 7:46 left to play.

Florida State's only score of the game came with 55 seconds left in the game, when, after a high snap, Oklahoma punter Jeff Ferguson alertly ran the ball into his own end zone for a safety to avoid giving Florida State the ball close to the Oklahoma goal line in a two-possession game.

After the Seminoles subsequently received the ball, Weinke's 29-yard pass into the end zone was intercepted by Ontei Jones with 16 seconds left. This allowed the Oklahoma Sooners to run out the clock and celebrate their first national championship in 15 years.

BCS National Championship Game at the 2001 Orange Bowl

Quarter	1	2	3	4	Total
No. 2 Florida State	0	0	0	2	2
No. 1 Oklahoma	3	0	3	7	13

at Pro Player Stadium • Miami Gardens, Florida

- Date: January 3, 2001
- Game time: 8:00 p.m. EST
- Game attendance: 76,835
- Referee: Dick Honig (Big Ten)
- TV announcers (ABC): Brad Nessler (play-by-play), Bob Griese (color) and Lynn Swann (sideline)
- ESPN game summary

Game information

First quarter

- (7:16) OKLA – Tim Duncan kick (Oklahoma 3–0)

Second quarter
No scoring
Third quarter

- (4:24) OKLA – Tim Duncan kick (Oklahoma 6–0)

Fourth quarter

- (7:46) OKLA – Quentin Griffin 10 yard rush, Tim Duncan kick (Oklahoma 13–0)
- (0:55) FSU – Safety (Oklahoma 13–2)

=== Statistics ===
Statistics	FSU	OKLA
First downs	14	12
Plays–yards		
Rushes–yards	274	36–56
Passing yards	194	214
Passing: comp–att–int	25–52–2	25–39–1
Turnovers		
Time of possession	23:27	36:33

Team	Category	Player	Statistics
FSU	Passing	Weinke	25/51, 274 yds, 2 INT
FSU	Rushing	Minor	13 rushes, 20 yds
FSU	Receiving	Bell	7 receptions, 137 yds
OKLA	Passing	Heupel	25/39, 214 yds, 1 INT
OKLA	Rushing	Griffin	11 rushes, 40 yds, 1 TD
OKLA	Receiving	Griffin	6 receptions, 23 yds

== Aftermath ==
This game marked the end of a 14-year stretch in which the Seminoles finished in the final AP and/or Coaches top four. They would not finish in the top four of the polls again until 2013, when they won the BCS National Championship led by another Heisman winning signal-caller, Jameis Winston.

Oklahoma was in their second season in the Bob Stoops era. Their victory over FSU was the beginning of a celebrated 18-year career in which the Sooners appeared in 11 BCS Bowls, which were the second most in that timespan behind Ohio State's 12. The Sooners returned to three more national championship games (in the 2003, 2004, and 2008 seasons), but fell short in all three under Stoops.
