= 2000 Colorado Buffaloes football team =

American college football season

2000 Colorado Buffaloes football
- Conference: Big 12 Conference
- North Division
- Record: 3–8 (3–5 Big 12)
- Head coach: Gary Barnett (2nd season)
- Offensive coordinator: Shawn Watson (1st season)
- Offensive scheme: Multiple
- Co-defensive coordinators: Tom McMahon (2nd season); Vince Okruch (2nd season)
- Base defense: Multiple 4–3
- MVPs: Tom Ashworth; Michael Lewis
- Captains: Tom Ashworth; Brady McDonnell
- Home stadium: Folsom Field

2000 Big 12 Conference football standings
| | Conf. | | | Overall |
| Team | W | | L | W | | L |
|---|---|---|---|---|---|---|
North Division
| No. 9 Kansas State xy | 6 | – | 2 | 11 | – | 3 |
| No. 8 Nebraska x | 6 | – | 2 | 10 | – | 2 |
| No. 25 Iowa State | 5 | – | 3 | 9 | – | 3 |
| Colorado | 3 | – | 5 | 3 | – | 8 |
| Kansas | 2 | – | 6 | 4 | – | 7 |
| Missouri | 2 | – | 6 | 3 | – | 8 |
South Division
| No. 1 Oklahoma x$# | 8 | – | 0 | 13 | – | 0 |
| No. 12 Texas | 7 | – | 1 | 9 | – | 3 |
| Texas A&M | 5 | – | 3 | 7 | – | 5 |
| Texas Tech | 3 | – | 5 | 7 | – | 6 |
| Oklahoma State | 1 | – | 7 | 3 | – | 8 |
| Baylor | 0 | – | 8 | 2 | – | 9 |
Championship: Oklahoma 27, Kansas State 24
# – BCS National Champion; $ – BCS representative as conference champion; x – Division champion/co-champions; y – Championship game participant; Rankings from AP Poll

The 2000 Colorado Buffaloes football team represented the University of Colorado at Boulder as a member of the North Division of the Big 12 Conference during the 2000 NCAA Division I FBS football season. Led by second-year head coach Gary Barnett, the Buffaloes compiled an overall record of 3–8 with a mark of 3–5 in conference play, placing fourth in the Big 12 North. Colorado played home games at Folsom Field in Boulder, Colorado.

== Schedule ==
| Date | Time | Opponent | Rank | Site | TV | Result | Attendance |
|---|---|---|---|---|---|---|---|
| September 2 | 5:00 pm | vs. Colorado State* | No. 23 | Mile High Stadium; Denver, CO (Rocky Mountain Showdown) | ESPN2 | L 24–28 | 67,567 |
| September 9 | 6:07 pm | at No. 11 USC* | | Los Angeles Memorial Coliseum; Los Angeles, CA | ABC | L 14–17 | 65,153 |
| September 16 | 1:30 pm | No. 9 Washington* | | Folsom Field; Boulder, CO | ABC | L 14–17 | 50,454 |
| September 30 | 1:30 pm | No. 5 Kansas State^{†} | | Folsom Field; Boulder, CO (rivalry) | ABC | L 21–44 | 51,896 |
| October 7 | 12:00 pm | at Texas A&M | | Kyle Field; College Station, TX | | W 26–19 | 75,523 |
| October 14 | 1:30 pm | No. 25 Texas | | Folsom Field; Boulder, CO | | L 14–28 | 52,030 |
| October 21 | 10:30 am | at Kansas | | Memorial Stadium; Lawrence, KS | FSN | L 15–23 | 32,600 |
| October 28 | 1:30 pm | Oklahoma State | | Folsom Field; Boulder, CO | | W 37–21 | 49,148 |
| November 4 | 12:00 pm | at Missouri | | Faurot Field; Columbia, MO | | W 28–18 | 50,567 |
| November 11 | 1:30 am | Iowa State | | Folsom Field; Boulder, CO | FSN | L 27–35 | 46,430 |
| November 24 | 10:00 am | at No. 9 Nebraska | | Memorial Stadium; Lincoln, NE (rivalry) | ABC | L 32–34 | 77,672 |
*Non-conference game; ^{†}Homecoming; Rankings from AP Poll released prior to the game; All times are in Mountain time

== Rankings ==
Ranking movements Legend: ██ Increase in ranking ██ Decrease in ranking — = Not ranked
| | Week | | | | | | | | | | | | | | | | |
| Poll | Pre | 1 | 2 | 3 | 4 | 5 | 6 | 7 | 8 | 9 | 10 | 11 | 12 | 13 | 14 | 15 | Final |
|---|---|---|---|---|---|---|---|---|---|---|---|---|---|---|---|---|---|
| AP | 24 | 23 | — | — | — | — | — | — | — | — | — | — | — | — | — | — | — |
| Coaches Poll | — | 25 | — | — | — | — | — | — | — | — | — | — | — | — | — | — | — |
| BCS | Not released | | | | | | | | | — | — | — | — | — | — | — | Not released |

== Roster ==
2000 Colorado Buffaloes football team roster
Players
Coaches
Offense

| Pos. | # | Name | Class |
|---|---|---|---|
| WR | 81 | Jason Burianek | So |
| WR | 14 | Cedric Cormier | Jr |
| TE | 89 | Daniel Graham | Jr |
| G | 65 | Andre Gurode | Jr |
| RB | 21 | Marcus Houston | Fr |
| QB | 4 | Bobby Pesavento | Jr |

Defense

| Pos. | # | Name | Class |
|---|---|---|---|
| DT | 97 | Justin Bannan | Jr |
| DE | 30 | Marques Harris | Fr |
| SS | 31 | Michael Lewis | Jr |
| DE | 60 | Matt McChesney | Fr |
| DE | 83 | Brady McDonnell | Sr |
| CB | 4 | Donald Strickland | So |

Special teams

| Pos. | # | Name | Class |

Head coach

- Gary Barnett

Coordinators/assistant coaches

Legend

- (C) Team captain
- (S) Suspended
- (I) Ineligible
- Injured
- Redshirt

Roster
