= 2000 Iowa State Cyclones football team =

American college football season

2000 Iowa State Cyclones football

Insight.com Bowl champion

Insight.com Bowl, W 37–29 vs. Pittsburgh
- Conference: Big 12 Conference
- North Division

Ranking
- Coaches: No. 23
- AP: No. 25
- Record: 9–3 (5–3 Big 12)
- Head coach: Dan McCarney (6th season)
- Offensive coordinator: Steve Loney (4th season)
- Offensive scheme: Pro-style
- Defensive coordinator: John Skladany (4th season)
- Base defense: 4–3
- Captains: Chris Anthony; Ryan Harklau; Reggie Hayward; Sage Rosenfels
- Home stadium: Jack Trice Stadium

2000 Big 12 Conference football standings
	Conf.			Overall
Team	W		L	W		L
North Division
No. 9 Kansas State xy	6	–	2	11	–	3
No. 8 Nebraska x	6	–	2	10	–	2
No. 25 Iowa State	5	–	3	9	–	3
Colorado	3	–	5	3	–	8
Kansas	2	–	6	4	–	7
Missouri	2	–	6	3	–	8
South Division
No. 1 Oklahoma x$#	8	–	0	13	–	0
No. 12 Texas	7	–	1	9	–	3
Texas A&M	5	–	3	7	–	5
Texas Tech	3	–	5	7	–	6
Oklahoma State	1	–	7	3	–	8
Baylor	0	–	8	2	–	9
Championship: Oklahoma 27, Kansas State 24
# – BCS National Champion; $ – BCS representative as conference champion; x – Division champion/co-champions; y – Championship game participant; Rankings from AP Poll

The 2000 Iowa State Cyclones football team represented Iowa State University as a member of the North Division in the Big 12 Conference during the 2000 NCAA Division I-A football season. Led by sixth-year head coach Dan McCarney, the Cyclones compiled an overall record of 9–3 with a mark of 5–3 in conference play, placing third in the Big 12's North Division. Iowa State was invited to the Insight.com Bowl, where the Cyclones defeated Pittsburgh. The team played home games at Jack Trice Stadium in Ames, Iowa.

This Iowa State's first winning season since 1989, and their first appearance in a bowl game since the 1978 Peach Bowl. The Insight.com Bowl victory was the programs first victory ever in bowl game. Before the season, Iowa State was picked by the media to finish fifth in the Big 12 North Division. Two players participated in postseason all-star games. Quarterback Sage Rosenfels played in the Senior Bowl, and Reggie Hayward played in the Hula Bowl, where he won the defensive MVP. Iowa State's nine victories were the most since the 1906 season.

The team's captains were Chris Anthony, Ryan Harklau, Hayward, and Rosenfels. Hayward and Rosenfels are among many former Cyclones from the 2000 team to play in the National Football League (NFL). Others were J. J. Moses Ennis Haywood, Tony Yelk, Mike Banks, Jordan Carstens, Tyson Smith and James Reed.

== Schedule ==
The Ohio game's date and time was changed from August 31 at 7 p.m. to September 2 at 11:30 a.m. The Baylor game was originally scheduled for 1:00 p.m., but was changed to 6:00 p.m. The Nebraska game was originally scheduled for kickoff at 1:00 p.m., it was changed to 2:30 p.m. to accommodate a broadcast on ABC. The Oklahoma State game was originally scheduled for 1:00 p.m. but was changed to 7:00 p.m. The Missouri game time was changed from 1:00 p.m. to 6:00 p.m. to accommodate a Fox Sports Net cablecast. On December 3 Iowa State announced it would accept a bowl invitation from the Insight.com Bowl.

Date	Time	Opponent	Site	TV	Result	Attendance
September 2	11:30 a.m.	Ohio*	Jack Trice Stadium; Ames, IA	FSN	W 25–15	34,385
September 9	1:00 p.m.	UNLV*	Jack Trice Stadium; Ames, IA		W 37–22	35,408
September 16	11:00 a.m.	at Iowa*	Kinnick Stadium; Iowa City, IA (rivalry)	ESPN	W 24–14	70,397
September 30	6:00 p.m.	at Baylor	Floyd Casey Stadium; Waco, TX		W 31–17	31,126
October 7	2:30 p.m.	No. 1 Nebraska	Jack Trice Stadium; Ames, IA (rivalry)	ABC	L 27–49	50,074
October 14	7:00 p.m.	at Oklahoma State	Lewis Field; Stillwater, OK		W 33–26	41,310
October 21	2:30 p.m.	Texas A&M^{†}	Jack Trice Stadium; Ames, IA	ABC	L 7–30	48,931
October 28	6:00 p.m.	Missouri	Jack Trice Stadium; Ames, IA (rivalry)	FSN	W 39–20	46,599
November 4	11:30 a.m.	at No. 15 Kansas State	KSU Stadium; Manhattan, KS (rivalry)	FSN	L 10–56	50,114
November 11	2:30 p.m.	at Colorado	Folsom Field; Boulder, CO	FSN	W 35–27	46,430
November 18	1:00 p.m.	Kansas	Jack Trice Stadium; Ames, IA		W 38–17	36,725
December 28	6:00 p.m.	vs. Pittsburgh*	Bank One Ballpark; Phoenix, AZ (Insight.com Bowl)	ESPN	W 37–29	41,813
*Non-conference game; ^{†}Homecoming; Rankings from AP Poll released prior to the game; All times are in Central time

== Rankings ==
=== AP Poll ===
Iowa State did not receive any points in the previous AP polls until October 1, 2000. On October 1, 2000 Iowa State received 5 points ranking them T-36th overall. On October 8, 2000 Iowa State received 8 points ranking them 34th overall. On October 15, 2000 Iowa State received 19 points ranking them 29th overall. On October 22, 2000 Iowa State received 3 points ranking them 37th overall. On October 29, 2000 Iowa State received 2 points ranking them T-36th overall. On November 5, 2000 Iowa State did not receive any points. On November 12, 2000 Iowa State received 6 points ranking them 33rd overall. On November 19, 2000 Iowa State received 10 points ranking them 31st overall. On November 26, 2000 Iowa State received 25 points ranking them 30th overall. On December 3, 2000 Iowa State received 22 points ranking them 30th overall. In the final poll Iowa State was ranked 25th with 188 points.

=== Coaches Poll ===
Iowa State did not receive any points in the coaches poll until September 17, 2000. On September 17, 2000 Iowa State received 4 points ranking them T-43rd. On September 24, 2000 Iowa State received 7 points for a ranking of 39th. On October 1, 2000 Iowa State received 37 points for a ranking of 31st. On October 8, 2000 Iowa State received 22 points for a ranking of T-35th. On October 15, 2000 Iowa State received 35 points for a ranking of 29th. On October 22, 2000 Iowa State received 2 points for a ranking of T-39th. On October 29, 2000 Iowa State received 16 points for a ranking of 33rd. On November 5, 2000 Iowa State did not receive any points in the poll. On November 12, 2000 Iowa State received 14 points for a ranking of 34th. On November 19, 2000 Iowa State received 14 points for a ranking of T-31st. On November 26, 2000 Iowa State received 28 points for a ranking of 30th. On December 3, 2000 Iowa State received 29 points for a ranking of 30th. On January 4, 2001 in the final poll of the year Iowa State received 225 points for a ranking of 23rd.

=== BCS Poll ===
Iowa State was never ranked in the BCS poll.

=== Week-by-week ===
Ranking movements Legend: ██ Increase in ranking ██ Decrease in ranking — = Not ranked RV = Received votes
	Week																
Poll	Pre	1	2	3	4	5	6	7	8	9	10	11	12	13	14	15	Final
AP	—	—	—	—	—	—	RV	RV	RV	RV	RV	—	RV	RV	RV	RV	25
Coaches	—	—	—	—	RV	RV	RV	RV	RV	RV	RV	—	RV	RV	RV	RV	23
BCS	Not released									—	—	—	—	—	—	—	Not released

== Game summaries ==
=== Game 1: vs. Ohio Bobcats ===
Game One: Ohio Bobcats at Iowa State Cyclones – Game summary

Quarter	1	2	3	4	Total
Bobcats	6	3	0	6	15
Cyclones	7	9	6	3	25

at Jack Trice Stadium, Ames, Iowa

- Date: September 2
- Game time: 11:38 a.m. CDT kickoff
- Game weather: Temperature: 74 Wind: E 5-10 Weather: cloudy and hazy
- Game attendance: 34,385
- Referee: Referee: Don Amicon; Umpire: Sam Dudich; Linesman: Steve Funjanic; Line judge: Mike Dolce; Back judge: Bob Moran; Field judge: Sam Williams; Side judge: Jeff Szink; Scorer: Pope/Shuey
- TV announcers (FSN): Drew Goodman (Play-by-play), Dave Lapham (Color) & Jim Knox (Sideline)

Game information

First Quarter

- 13:04 OHIO – Brinker, Chad 5 yd run (Kerr, Kevin kick blocked), 6 plays, 53 yards, TOP 1:56, OHIO 6 – ISU 0
- 02:21 ISU – Wagner, Michael 10 yd run (McKnight, Mike kick), 4 plays, 64 yards, TOP 1:15, OHIO 6 – ISU 7

Second Quarter

- 13:19 OHIO – Kerr, Kevin 33 yd field goal, 9 plays, 56 yards, TOP 4:02, OHIO 9 – ISU 7
- 08:17 ISU – McKnight, Mike 27 yd field goal, 11 plays, 62 yards, TOP 5:02, OHIO 9 – ISU 10
- 02:47 ISU – Rosenfels, Sage 1 yd run (McKnight, Mike kick failed), 9 plays, 50 yards, TOP 3:30, OHIO 9 – ISU 16

Third Quarter

- 07:11 ISU – Haywood, Ennis 73 yd run (Yelk, Tony kick failed), 1 play, 73 yards, TOP 0:10, OHIO 9 – ISU 22

Fourth Quarter

- 10:02 ISU – McKnight, Mike 22 yd field goal, 9 plays, 69 yards, TOP 4:06, OHIO 9 – ISU 25
- 07:55 OHIO – Ray, Raynald 28 yd pass from Jackson, D. (Brinker, Chad rush failed), 6 plays, 78 yards, TOP 1:45, OHIO 15 – ISU 25

=== Game 2: vs. UNLV Rebels ===
Game Two: UNLV Rebels at Iowa State Cyclones – Game summary

Quarter	1	2	3	4	Total
Rebels	6	0	9	7	22
Cyclones	14	13	7	3	37

at Jack Trice Stadium, Ames, Iowa

- Date: September 9
- Game time: 1:06 p.m. CDT kickoff
- Game weather: Temperature: 82 Wind: SSW10-15 Weather: Sunny, gusts to 20
- Game attendance: 35,408
- Referee: Referee: Steve Usechek; Umpire: John Davidson; Linesman: Tim Pringle; Line judge: Derick Bowers; Back judge: Randy McAnally; Field judge: Brad Van Vark; Side judge: Freeman Johns; Scorer: Shuey/Pope

Game information

First Quarter

- 10:37 ISU – Anthony, Chris 39 yd pass from Rosenfels, Sage (McKnight, Mike kick), UNLV 0 – ISU 7
- 07:08 UNLV – Thomas, Jason 45 yd run (Cheetany, Ray kick failed), UNLV 6 – ISU 7
- 00:32 ISU – Wagner, Michael 3 yd run (McKnight, Mike kick), UNLV 6 – ISU 14

Second Quarter

- 13:35 ISU – McKnight, Mike 40 yd field goal,, UNLV 6 – ISU 17
- 12:53 ISU – Danielsen, Lane 0 yd blocked punt return (McKnight, Mike kick), UNLV 6 – ISU 24
- 00:53 ISU – McKnight, Mike 26 yd field goal,, UNLV 6 – ISU 27

Third Quarter

- 10:17 UNLV – Cheetany, Ray 32 yd field goal,, UNLV 9 – ISU 27
- 02:03 UNLV – Turner, Nate 56 yd pass from Thomas, Jason (Thomas, Jason rush failed), UNLV 15 – ISU 27
- 00:35 ISU – Moses, J.J. 78 yd pass from Rosenfels, Sage (McKnight, Mike kick), UNLV 15 – ISU 34

Fourth Quarter

- 14:12 UNLV – Turner, Nate 31 yd pass from Thomas, Jason (Cheetany, Ray kick), UNLV 22 – ISU 34
- 01:59 ISU – McKnight, Mike 34 yd field goal,, UNLV 22 – ISU 37

=== Game 3: @ Iowa Hawkeyes ===
Game Three: Iowa State Cyclones @ Iowa Hawkeyes – Game summary

Quarter	1	2	3	4	Total
Cyclones	10	7	0	7	24
Hawkeyes	7	0	0	7	14

at Kinnick Stadium, Iowa City, Iowa

- Date: September 16
- Game time: 11:10 a.m. CDT kickoff
- Game weather: Temperature: 70 Wind: N 10-15 Weather: Sunny
- Game attendance: 70,397
- Referee: Referee: Jon Bible; Umpire: Bob Holliday; Linesman: David Alexander; Line judge: Rusty Weir; Back judge: Mark Johnson; Field judge: Greg Burks; Side judge: Duane Osborne
- TV announcers (ESPN): Steve Levy (Play-by-play), Todd Christensen (Color) & Dave Ryan (Sideline)

Game information

First quarter

- 13:01 ISU – Moses, J.J. 58 yd run (McKnight, Mike kick), 1 play, 58 yards, TOP 0:12, ISU 7 – IOWA 0
- 09:19 IOWA – Kasper, Kevin 4 yd pass from Mullen, Scott (Kaeding, Nate kick), 8 plays, 66 yards, TOP 3:42, ISI 7 – IOWA 7
- 05:12 ISU – McKnight, Mike 22 yd field goal, 10 plays, 76 yards, TOP 4:07, ISU 10 – IOWA 7

Second quarter

- 06:20 ISU – Rosenfels, Sage 1 yd run (McKnight, Mike kick), 8 plays, 57 yards, TOP 3:35, ISU 17 – IOWA 7

Fourth quarter

- 09:30 IOWA – Hill, Kahlil 8 yd pass from Mullen, Scott (Kaeding, Nate kick), 10 plays, 59 yards, TOP 3:08, ISU 17 – IOWA 14
- 05:05 ISU – Rosenfels, Sage 5 yd run (McKnight, Mike kick), 10 plays, 79 yards, TOP 4:25, ISU 24 – IOWA 14

=== Game 4: @ Baylor Bears ===
Game Four: Iowa State Cyclones @ Baylor Bears – Game summary

Quarter	1	2	3	4	Total
Cyclones	10	21	0	0	31
Bears	3	0	7	7	17

at Floyd Casey Stadium, Waco, Texas

- Date: September 30
- Game time: 6:00 p.m. CDT kickoff
- Game weather: Temperature: 86 Wind: S 12 Weather: Clear and Sunny
- Game attendance: 31,126
- Referee: Referee: Terry Turlington; Umpire: J. C. Leimbach; Linesman: Fred Hutchinson; Line judge: Steve Stelljes; Back judge: David Ames; Field judge: Terry Porter; Side judge: Freeman Johns; Scorer: Dave Ross

Game information

First Quarter

- 08:43 ISU – McKnight, Mike 20 yd field goal, 8 plays, 56 yards, TOP 2:50, ISU 3 – BAY 0
- 06:56 ISU – Haywood, Ennis 3 yd run (McKnight, Mike kick), 4 plays, 25 yards, TOP 1:37, ISU 10 – BAY 0
- 00:49 BAY – Andino, Daniel 20 yd field goal, 15 plays, 75 yards, TOP 6:07, ISU 10 – BAY 3

Second Quarter

- 05:49 ISU – Haywood, Ennis 9 yd run (McKnight, Mike kick), 14 plays, 61 yards, TOP 5:14, ISU 17 – BAY 3
- 01:37 ISU – Woodley, Joe 1 yd run (McKnight, Mike kick), 7 plays, 33 yards, TOP 2:57, ISU 24 – BAY 3
- 00:58 ISU – Moses, J.J. 38 yd pass from Rosenfels, Sage (McKnight, Mike kick), 4 plays, 55 yards, TOP 0:32, ISU 31 – BAY 3

Third Quarter

- 11:48 BAY – Newhouse, Reggie 54 yd pass from Tomcheck, Guy (Andino, Daniel kick), 6 plays, 80 yards, TOP 3:12, ISU 31 – BAY 10

Fourth Quarter

- 12:11 BAY – Bush, Darrell 1 yd run (Andino, Daniel kick), 8 plays, 80 yards, TOP 3:43 ISU 31 – BAY 17

=== Game 5: vs. Nebraska Cornhuskers ===
Game Five: Nebraska Cornhuskers at Iowa State Cyclones – Game summary

Quarter	1	2	3	4	Total
Cornhuskers	0	13	8	28	49
Cyclones	7	7	6	7	27

at Jack Trice Stadium, Ames, Iowa

- Date: October 7
- Game time: 2:35 p.m. CDT kickoff
- Game weather: Temperature: 41 F Wind: N 15-25 Weather: cloudy
- Game attendance: 50,074
- Referee: Referee: Hal Dowden; Umpire: Richard Brown; Linesman: Al Green; Line judge: Roger Rogers; Back judge: Will Weisbrook; Field judge: Brad Horchem; Side judge: Larry Weeks; Scorer: Shuey/Pope
- TV announcers (ABC): Chip Tarkenton (Play-by-play) & Reggie Rivers (Color)

Game information

First Quarter

- 09:41 ISU – Campbell, Craig 53 yd pass from Rosenfels, Sage (McKnight, Mike kick), 3 plays, 52 yards, TOP 1:21, NU 0 – ISU 7

Second Quarter

- 13:28 NU – Buckhalter, C. 9 yd run (Brown, Josh kick), 3 plays, 50 yards, TOP 1:18, NU 7 – ISU 7
- 10:45 NU – Brown, Josh 40 yd field goal, 4 plays, -3 yards, TOP 1:18, NU 10 – ISU 7
- 08:12 ISU – Powers, Jamarcu 40 yd interception return (McKnight, Mike kick), NU 10 – ISU 14
- 05:29 NU – Brown, Josh 24 yd field goal, 7 plays, 61 yards, TOP 2:43, NU 13 – ISU 14

Third Quarter

- 11:13 NU – Buckhalter, C. 1 yd run (Golliday, Aaron pass), 5 plays, 39 yards, TOP 1:56, NU 21 – ISU 14
- 06:46 ISU – Haywood, Ennis 4 yd run (McKnight, Mike kick failed), 11 plays, 80 yards, TOP 4:27, NU 21 – ISU 20

Fourth Quarter

- 11:09 NU – Miller, Willie 9 yd run (Brown, Josh kick), 11 plays, 70 yards, TOP 5:27, NU 28 – ISU 20
- 09:55 NU – Buckhalter, C. 1 yd run (Brown, Josh kick), 3 plays, 18 yards, TOP 0:56, NU 35 – ISU 20
- 04:05 NU – Crouch, Eric 1 yd run (Brown, Josh kick), 9 plays, 58 yards, TOP 4:33, NU 42 – ISU 20
- 03:06 ISU – Moses, J.J. 15 yd pass from Rosenfels, Sage (McKnight, Mike kick), 7 plays, 65 yards, TOP 0:59, NU 42 – ISU 27
- 01:01 NU – Lord, Jammal 6 yd run (Brown, Josh kick), 6 plays, 43 yards, TOP 2:05, NU 49 – ISU 27

=== Game 6: @ Oklahoma State Cowboys ===
Game Six: Iowa State Cyclones @ Oklahoma State Cowboys – Game summary

Quarter	1	2	3	4	Total
Cyclones	6	7	7	13	33
Cowboys	13	3	7	3	26

at Lewis Field, Stillwater, Oklahoma

- Date: October 14
- Game time: 7:05 p.m. CDT kickoff
- Game weather: Temperature: 74 Wind: SSE 8-12 Weather: partly cloudy skies
- Game attendance: 41,310
- Referee: Referee: Steve Usecheck; Umpire: John Davidson; Linesman: Tim Pringle; Line judge: Derick Bowers; Back judge: Randy McAnally; Field judge: Brad Van Vark; Side judge: Phil Laurie; Scorer: Lee Manzer

Game information

First Quarter

11:55 ISU – Wagner, Michael 2 yd run (McKnight, Mike kick blocked), 6 plays, 68 yards, TOP 2:02, ISU 6 – OSU 0 03:57 OSU – Lindsay, Gabe 9 yd pass from Pogi, Aso (Condley, Seth kick), 15 plays, 80 yards, TOP 7:58, ISU 6 – OSU 7 01:04 OSU – Rivers, M. 25 yd pass from Pogi, Aso (Condley, Seth kick failed), 3 plays, 42 yards, TOP 1:03, ISU 6 – OSU 13

Second Quarter

12:42 ISU – Wagner, Michael 5 yd run (McKnight, Mike kick), 9 plays, 90 yards, TOP 3:22, ISU 13 – OSU 13 00:14 OSU – Condley, Seth 35 yd field goal, 11 plays, 56 yards, TOP 3:25, ISU 13 – OSU 16

Third Quarter

12:38 ISU – Wagner, Michael 13 yd pass from 8A (Billups, JaMain kick), 8 plays, 72 yards, TOP 2:22, ISU 20 – OSU 16 09:32 OSU – Pogi, Aso 6 yd run (Condley, Seth kick), 8 plays, 67 yards, TOP 3:06, ISU 20 – OSU 23

Fourth Quarter

12:32 ISU – Billups, JaMain 20 yd field goal, 14 plays, 60 yards, TOP 4:42, ISU 23 – OSU 23 08:15 ISU – Billups, JaMain 34 yd field goal, 7 plays, 42 yards, TOP 2:17, ISU 26 – OSU 23 02:41 OSU – Condley, Seth 34 yd field goal, 16 plays, 71 yards, TOP 5:34, ISU 26 – OSU 26 00:18 ISU – Danielsen, Lane 33 yd pass from 8A (Billups, JaMain kick), 7 plays, 61 yards, TOP 0:59, ISU 33 – OSU 26

=== Game 7: vs. Texas A&M Aggies ===
Game Seven: Texas A&M Aggies at Iowa State Cyclones – Game summary

Quarter	1	2	3	4	Total
Aggies	10	10	3	7	30
Cyclones	0	0	0	7	7

at Jack Trice Stadium, Ames, Iowa

- Date: October 21
- Game time: 2:36 p.m. CDT kickoff
- Game weather: Temperature: 75 Wind: SE 10 Weather: Mostly Sunny
- Game attendance: 48,931
- Referee: Referee: Jon Bible; Umpire: Bob Holliday; Linesman: David Alexander; Line judge: Rusty Weir; Back judge: Ron Murphy; Field judge: Greg Burks; Side judge: Freeman Johns; Scorer: Shuey/Pope
- TV announcers (ABC): Sean McDonough (Play-by-play), Ed Cunningham (Color) & Leslie Gudel (Sideline)

Game information

First Quarter

- 12:47 TAMU – Farris, Mark 5 yd run (Kitchens, Tere. kick), 2 plays, 5 yards, TOP 0:40, TAMU 7 – ISU 0
- 03:08 TAMU – Kitchens, Tere. 27 yd field goal, 16 plays, 70 yards, TOP 7:06, TAMU 10 – ISU 0

Second Quarter

- 13:48 TAMU – Goynes, Dwain 76 yd pass from Farris, Mark (Kitchens, Tere. kick), 4 plays, 91 yards, TOP 1:27, TAMU 17 – ISU 0
- 09:05 TAMU – Kitchens, Tere. 22 yd field goal, 7 plays, 64 yards, TOP 2:54, TAMU 20 – ISU 0

Third Quarter

- 06:00 TAMU – Kitchens, Tere. 50 yd field goal, 8 plays, 30 yards, TOP 2:26, TAMU 23 – ISU 0

Fourth Quarter

- 07:48 TAMU – Taylor, Chris 15 yd pass from Farris, Mark (Kitchens, Tere. kick), 3 plays, 34 yards, TOP 1:09, TAMU 30 – ISU 0
- 02:36 ISU – Danielsen, Lane 43 yd pass from Scott, Gerrin (Gomez, Carl kick), 6 plays, 50 yards, TOP 1:57, TAMU 30 – ISU 7

=== Game 8: vs. Missouri Tigers ===
Game Eight: Missouri Tigers at Iowa State Cyclones – Game summary

Quarter	1	2	3	4	Total
Tigers	7	7	0	6	20
Cyclones	6	20	7	6	39

at Jack Trice Stadium, Ames, Iowa

- Date: October 28
- Game time: 6:09 p.m. CDT kickoff
- Game attendance: 46,599
- Referee: Referee: Terry Turlington; Umpire: Joe Darden; Linesman: Fred Hutchinson; Line judge: Steve Stelljes; Back judge: David Ames; Field judge: Terry Porter; Side judge: Tom Walker; Scorer: Shuey/Pope
- TV announcers (FSN): Ron Thulin (Play-by-play), James Lofton (Color) & Eric Clemons (Sideline)

Game information

First Quarter

- 09:46 MU – Outlaw, Darius 10 run (Scott, Justin kick), MU 7 – ISU 0
- 07:13 ISU – Rosenfels, Sage 2 yd run (kick failed), MU 7 – ISU 6

Second Quarter

- 14:30 ISU – Moses, J.J. 34 run (Gomez, Carl kick), MU 7 – ISU 13
- 08:13 ISU – Haywood, Ennis 14 run (Gomez, Carl kick), MU 7 – ISU 20
- 05:21 ISU – Haywood, Ennis 4 run (two-point conversion failed), MU 7 – ISU 26
- 01:45 MU – Abron, Zack 7 run (Scott, Justin kick), MU 14 – ISU 26

Third Quarter

- 06:29 ISU – Timmons, Marc 78 yd interception return (Gomez, Carl kick), MU 14 – ISU 33

Fourth Quarter

- 11:26 ISU – Rosenfels, Sage 5 run (two-point conversion failed), MU 14 – ISU 39
- 09:41 MU – Spencer, Eric 29 pass from Outlaw, Darius (two-point conversion failed), MU 20 – ISU 39

=== Game 9: @ Kansas State Wildcats ===
Game Nine: Iowa State Cyclones @ Kansas State Wildcats – Game summary

Quarter	1	2	3	4	Total
Cyclones	3	0	0	7	10
Wildcats	21	14	14	7	56

at KSU Stadium • Manhattan, Kansas

- Date: November 4
- Game time: 11:38 a.m. CST kickoff
- Game weather: Temperature: 59 Wind: S 5-15 Weather: Mostly sunny
- Game attendance: 50,114
- Referee: Referee: Jon Bible; Umpire: Bob Holliday; Linesman: David Alexander; Line judge: Gary Brown; Back judge: Ron Murphy; Field judge: Greg Burks; Side judge: Butch Clark
- TV announcers (FSN): Drew Goodman (Play-by-play), Dave Lapham (Color) & Jim Knox (Sideline)

Game information
Scoring Summary:

First Quarter

- 09:48 KSU – Scobey, Josh 2 yd run (Rheem, Jamie kick) 7 plays, 67 yards, TOP 3:03 ISU 0 – KSU 7
- 05:10 ISU – Gomez, Carl 30 yd field goal 11 plays, 67 yards, TOP 4:38 ISU 3 – KSU 7
- 04:18 KSU – Scobey, Josh 1 yd run (Rheem, Jamie kick) 4 plays, 64 yards, TOP 0:52 ISU 3 – KSU 14
- 01:21 KSU – Scobey, Josh 4 yd run (Rheem, Jamie kick) 4 plays, 50 yards, TOP 0:46 ISU 3 – KSU 21

Second Quarter

- 11:27 KSU – Claybon, Chris 8 yd run (Rheem, Jamie kick) 11 plays, 52 yards, TOP 4:22 ISU 3 – KSU 28
- 00:22 KSU – Morgan, Quincy 29 yd pass from Beasley, J. (Rheem, Jamie kick) 4 plays, 43 yards, TOP 0:44 ISU 3 – KSU 35

Third Quarter

- 09:45 KSU – Beasley, J. 1 yd run (Rheem, Jamie kick) 6 plays, 45 yards, TOP 2:38 ISU 3 – KSU 42
- 07:10 KSU – Scobey, Josh 11 yd run (Rheem, Jamie kick) 5 plays, 65 yards, TOP 1:27 ISU 3 – KSU 49

Fourth Quarter

- 11:17 ISU – Rosenfels, Sage 1 yd run (Gomez, Carl kick) 7 plays, 58 yards, TOP 3:32 ISU 10 – KSU 49
- 05:17 KSU – Clark, Brandon 23 yd pass from Roberson, Ell (Rheem, Jamie kick) 8 plays, 80 yards, TOP 2:19 ISU 10 – KSU 56

=== Game 10: @ Colorado Buffaloes ===
Game Ten: Iowa State Cyclones @ Colorado Buffaloes – Game summary

Quarter	1	2	3	4	Total
Cyclones	3	9	20	3	35
Buffaloes	13	7	7	0	27

at Folsom Field • Boulder, Colorado

- Date: November 11
- Game time: 2:35 p.m. CST kickoff
- Game attendance: 46,430
- TV announcers (FSN): Drew Goodman (Play-by-play), Dave Lapham (Color) & Jim Knox (Sideline)

Game information

First Quarter

- 11:38 ISU – Gomez, Carl 43 yd field goal, ISU 3 – CU 0
- 05:22 CU – Johnson, Cortlen 7 run (kick failed), ISU 3 – CU 6
- 02:29 CU – Johnson, Cortlen 7 run (Mariscal, Mark kick), ISU 3 – CU 13

Second Quarter

- 11:28 ISU – Haywood, Ennis 1 run (kick failed), ISU 9 – CU 13
- 08:17 CU – Johnson, Cortlen 16 run (Mariscal, Mark kick), ISU 9 – CU 20
- 03:27 ISU – Gomez, Carl 27 yd field goal, ISU 12 – CU 20

Third Quarter

- 08:26 ISU – Rosenfels, Sage 1 run (run failed), ISU 18 – CU 20
- 04:45 ISU – Moses, J.J. 44 pass from Rosenfels, Sage (Haywood, Ennis pass from Rosenfels, Sage), ISU 26 – CU 20
- 03:39 ISU – Rosenfels, Sage 1 run (pass failed), ISU 32 – CU 20
- 00:15 CU – McCready, Eric 5 pass from Ochs, Craig (Mariscal, Mark kick), ISU 32 – CU 27

Fourth Quarter

- 06:42 ISU – Gomez, Carl 46 yd field goal, ISU 35 – CU 27

=== Game 11: vs. Kansas Jayhawks ===
Game Eleven: Kansas Jayhawks at Iowa State Cyclones – Game summary

Quarter	1	2	3	4	Total
Jayhawks	0	10	0	7	17
Cyclones	7	10	7	14	38

at Jack Trice Stadium, Ames, Iowa

- Date: November 18
- Game time: 1:00 p.m. CDT kickoff
- Game weather: Temperature: 28 F Wind: NNW 20-25 Weather: Cloudy WCI: 0
- Game attendance: 36,725
- Referee: Referee: Tom Ahlers, Umpire: Jim Jankowski, Linesman: Tim Pringle, Line judge: Ron Underwood, Back judge: Mike Weir, Field judge: Scott Gaines, Side judge: Duane Osborne, Scorer: Pope/Shuey

Game information

First Quarter

- 11:00 ISU – Rosenfels, Sage 2 yd run (Gomez, Carl kick), 7 plays, 29 yards, TOP 2:13 KU 0 – ISU 7

Second Quarter

- 09:21 ISU – Rosenfels, Sage 14 yd run (Gomez, Carl kick), 9 plays, 75 yards, TOP 4:03 KU 0 – ISU 14
- 02:49 KU – Garcia, Joe 37 yd field goal, 15 plays, 56 yards, TOP 6:32 KU 3 – ISU 14
- 01:17 KU – Winbush, David 1 yd run (Garcia, Joe kick), 1 play, 1 yard, TOP 0:03 KU 10 – ISU 14
- 00:00 ISU – Gomez, Carl 43 yd field goal, 11 plays, 49 yards, TOP 1:17 KU 10 – ISU 17

Third Quarter

- 12:17 ISU – Wagner, Michael 66 yd run (Gomez, Carl kick), 5 plays, 80 yards, TOP 2:43 KU 10 – ISU 24

Fourth Quarter

- 08:48 ISU – Woodley, Joe 1 yd run (Gomez, Carl kick), 10 plays, 86 yards, TOP 5:11 KU 10 – ISU 31
- 05:57 KU – Hill, Harrison 6 yd pass from Smith, Dylen (Garcia, Joe kick), 10 plays, 86 yards, TOP 2:51 KU 17 – ISU 31
- 02:47 ISU – Haywood, Ennis 6 yd run (Gomez, Carl kick), 7 plays, 68 yards, TOP 3:10 KU 17 – ISU 38

=== Game 12: vs. Pittsburgh Panthers ===
Game Twelve: Pittsburgh Panthers vs. Iowa State Cyclones – Game summary

Quarter	1	2	3	4	Total
Panthers	7	0	13	9	29
Cyclones	7	20	0	10	37

at Bank One Ballpark • Phoenix, Arizona

- Date: December 28
- Game time: 6:00 p.m. CDT kickoff
- Game attendance: 41,813
- TV announcers (ESPN): Steve Levy (Play-by-play), Todd Christensen (Color) & Dave Ryan (Sideline)

Game information

First Quarter

- 08:32 PITT – Bryant, Antonio 72 pass from Turman, John (Lotz, Nick kick) PITT 7 – ISU 0
- 04:52 ISU – Anthony, Chris 23 pass from Rosenfels, Sage (Gomez, Carl kick), PITT 7 – ISU 7

Second Quarter

- 13:48 ISU – Woodley, Joe 1 run (run failed), PITT 7 – ISU 13
- 08:03 ISU – Haywood, Ennis 3 run (Gomez, Carl kick), PITT 7 – ISU 20
- 03:23 ISU – Anthony, Chris 9 pass from Rosenfels, Sage (Gomez, Carl kick), PITT 7 – ISU 27

Third Quarter

- 08:10 PITT – Rutherford, Rod 2 run (Lotz, Nick kick), PITT 14 – ISU 27
- 02:05 PITT – Bryant, Antonio 44 pass from Turman (kick failed), PITT 20 – ISU 27

Fourth Quarter

- 14:33 ISU – Billups, Jamaine 72 punt return (Gomez, Carl kick), PITT 20 – ISU 34
- 11:08 PITT – Lotz, Nick 25 yd field goal, PITT 23 – ISU 34
- 09:45 PITT – Barlow, Kevan 3 run (pass failed), PITT 29 – ISU 34
- 04:53 ISU – Gomez, Carl 41 yd field goal, PITT 29 – ISU 37

== Personnel ==
=== Roster ===
On June 30, 2000 FB Robert Lewis was dismissed from the team for violating team rules.

List of signees.

Depth chart

Note: No= Number; Name = Name; Pos = Position; Ht = Height; Wt = Weight; Yr = Year; Hometown = Hometown; * = Letter earned; ^{C} = Captain

No.	Name	Pos	Ht	Wt	Yr	Hometown (High School/Previous School)
1	Tyson Smith	LB	6-4	210	Fr.	Des Moines, Iowa (Dowling)
2	Ennis Haywood**	RB	5-11	206	Jr.	Dallas, Texas (Carter)
3	Bryan Ollie	DB	5-8	178	Fr.#	Des Moines, Iowa (Dowling)
4	Derrick Walker*	LB	6-2	235	Sr.	Houston, Texas (Aldine/Blinn JC)
4	Sam Holden	DB	6-3	197	So.#	Manchester, Iowa (West Delaware)
5	Andrew Moser*	LB	5-10	231	Jr.#	Guttenberg, Iowa (Guttenberg)
5	Todd Miller	WR	5-9	160	Fr.	Mount Pleasant, Iowa (Mount Pleasant)
6	Carl Gomez***	P	6-2	198	Sr.	Miami, Florida (Killian)
6	JaMaine Billups	RB	6-0	192	Fr.	Omaha, Nebraska (Central)
7	Dustin Avey***	DB	6-2	208	Sr.#	Ames, Iowa (Ames)
8	Jamarcus Powers*	DB	5-8	164	Sr.	La Marque, Texas (La Marque/Blinn JC)
9	Adam Runk**	DB	6-2	184	Jr.#	Stillwater, Minnesota (Stillwater)
10	Johnny Smith III	DB	5-10	170	Fr.#	Bradenton, Florida (Southeast)
10	Dan Salmen	QB	6-1	187	Fr.#	St. Paul, Minnesota (Cretin-Derham Hall)
11	Steffen Nass	P/PK	6-3	197	So.#	Clinton, Iowa (Clinton)
11	Princeton Harris	DB	6-1	207	Fr.	Friendswood, Texas (Clear Brook)
12	Joel Washington	DB	6-1	197	Fr.#	Southfield, Michigan (Southeast)
13	Julian Cummings	DB	5-8	167	Fr.#	West Covina, California (Bishop Amat)
13	Andy Kohler	WR	6-4	185	Fr.	Ames, Iowa (Ames)
14	Jesse Arnold	WR	6-3	200	So.	St. Charles, Iowa (Martensdale-St. MaryÕs)
14	Tony Yelk	PK	6-1	190	Fr.	Arlington, Wisconsin (Poynette)
14	Harold Clewis	DB	5-10	173	Fr.	Missouri City, Texas (Elkins)
15	Reggie Hayward***^{C}	DE	6-5	250	Sr.	Dolton, Illinois (Thornridge)
15	Kyle Swenor	QB	6-2	201	Fr.#	Levering, Michigan (Petoskey)
15	Cris Love	QB	6-5	200	Fr.	Round Rock, Texas (Round Rock)
17	Gerrin Scott	QB	6-0	209	Fr.#	Denver, Colorado (Thomas Jefferson)
17	Adam Wagner	WR	5-9	173	So.#	Ames, Iowa (Ames)
17	Anthony Forrest	DB	6-1	185	Fr.	Ft. Worth, Texas (Diamond Hill-Jarvis)
18	Sage Rosenfels***^{C}	QB	6-4	221	Sr.#	Maquoketa, Iowa (Maquoketa)
18	Marc Timmons	DB	5-9	168	Fr.#	Bradenton, Florida (Southeast)
19	Craig Campbell*	WR	5-11	185	Jr.	Santa Fe Springs, California (Santa Fe/Mt. SAC CC)
20	Michael Wagner	RB	5-7	182	Fr.#	West Covina, California (Bishop Amat)
20	Henry Poullard	DB	5-11	165	Fr.	La Porte, Texas (La Porte)
21	Atif Austin*	DB	5-8	180	So.#	Tarpon Springs, Florida (Tarpon Springs)
21	Nick Hein	DB	5-7	179	Sr.#	Monticello, Iowa (Monticello)
22	Ryan Sloth**	DB	5-8	184	Sr.#	Belmond, Iowa (Belmond-Klemme)
23	Stevie Johnson	LB	6-4	225	Sr.	Beaumont, Mississippi (Perry Central)
24	Doug Densmore***	DB	5-10	195	Sr.#	Sterling, Illinois (Sterling)
25	Scott Horne	DB	6-2	212	So.	Vancouver, B.C. (Notre Dame HS/CCH)
26	Jack Whitver	WR	5-10	180	Fr.#	Grinnell, Iowa (Grinnell)
27	Breon Ansley***	DB	5-7	172	Sr.	Rowland Heights, California (Bishop Amat)
29	Jordan Wagner	WR	6-0	186	Fr.#	Cedar Rapids, Iowa (Linn-Mar)
31	Mike Banks**	TE	6-4	254	Jr.	Ogden, Iowa (Ogden)
31	Clint Bushbaum	DB	6-0	187	So.#	Rockwell, Iowa (Rockwell-Swaledale)
32	J.J. Moses**	WR	5-6	170	Sr.	Waterloo, Iowa (East)
33	Jedd Moore	LB	5-11	201	Sr.#	Waterloo, Iowa (Columbus)
33	Larry Anglin	RB	5-9	190	Jr.	Compton, California (Gardena/Compton CC)
34	Royce Hooks	LB	5-9	201	Fr.#	Jacksonville, Florida (White)
35	Andrae Rainey	WR	6-1	187	Jr.#	Waterloo, Iowa (Northern University HS)
35	Cale Stubbe	LB	6-3	235	Fr.	Cedar Falls, Iowa (Cedar Falls)
36	Brett Kellogg	LB	6-3	235	Fr.	Cedar Rapids, Iowa (Kennedy)
37	Jamie Burkhead	DB	6-2	191	Sr.	Bellflower, Ca (St.John Bosco)
38	Curt Schroeder	LB	6-0	203	Jr.#	Camanche, Iowa (Camanche)
39	Matt Grosserode	FB	5-10	210	Fr.	Lincoln, Nebraska (Pius X)
40	Brent Nash	LB	5-11	225	Fr.	Beverly Hills, California (Beverly Hills)
41	Ab Turner**	LB	6-0	220	Sr.#	Denver, Colorado (Jefferson/Grossmont)
42	Frank Garcia	FB	5-9	225	Fr.#	North Bay Village, Florida (Edward Pace)
42	Nick Linder	DB/WR	5-10	181	Fr.#	Iowa City, Iowa (City)
43	Sean Manatt	DB	5-10	181	So.#	Ames, Iowa (Ames)
43	Ryan Corcoran	RB	5-10	200	Fr.	Sioux Falls, South Dakota
44	Ryan Harklau***^{C}	DL	6-4	280	Sr.#	Humboldt, Iowa (Humboldt)
45	Joe Woodley	FB	5-10	233	Fr.#	West Des Moines, Iowa (Valley)
46	Matt Word*	LB	5-11	235	So.	Miami, Florida (Southridge)
47	Chris Whitaker*	LB	5-11	235	So.	East St. Louis, Illinois (Althoff)
48	Justin Eilers	LB	6-2	225	Jr.	Boise, Idaho (Nampa/Butte JC)
49	Eric Weiford**	DE/LB	5-11	215	Sr.#	Oelwein, Iowa (Oelwein)
51	Andy Leaders	LB	6-3	225	Fr.	Omaha, Nebraska (Millard West)
52	James Reed***	DL	6-0	285	Sr.#	Saginaw, Michigan (Saginaw)
53	Todd Slycord	DL/LB	5-11	224	Fr.#	West Des Moines, Iowa (Valley)
54	Adam Jablonski	DL/LB	6-3	226	So.#	Mason City, Iowa (Newman)
55	Jared Bucksa*	OL	6-3	288	Jr.#	New Brighton, Minnesota (Totino-Grace)
56	Adam Sansale	OL	6-2	286	Jr.#	South St. Paul, Minnesota (Cretin-Derham Hall)
56	Tyrone Tucker	LB	6-2	236	Jr.	Miami, Florida (South Miami/San Francisco City CC)
56	Tiray Johnson	DL	5-11	261	Jr.#	Detroit, Michigan (Cass Tech)
58	Scott Davis	OL	6-4	300	Jr.#	Coral Springs, Florida (M. Stoneman Douglas)
60	Brent Nelson	OL	6-3	240	Fr.	Cedar Rapids, Iowa (Kennedy)
62	George Cunningham	OL	6-6	274	Jr.#	Algona, Iowa (Algona)
63	Ben Bruns***	OL	6-3	295	Sr.#	Denver, Iowa (Denver)
64	Andrew Kelley	OL	6-2	309	Jr.#	Knoxville, Iowa (Knoxville)
65	Bob Montgomery	OL	6-3	311	Fr.#	Lincoln, Nebraska (Pius X)
66	Kerry Carlson	OL	6-2	291	Jr.	Goodhue, Minnesota (Goodhue/Rochester CC)
66	Kit Curry	DL/LB	6-1	227	Fr.#	Humboldt, Iowa (Humboldt)
67	Cory Hannen**	OL	6-5	300	Jr.#	Hiawatha, Iowa (Cedar Rapids Kennedy)
67	Luke VanderSanden	DL	6-3	275	Fr.	Inwood, Iowa (West Lyon)
68	Zach Butler*	OL	6-4	285	So.#	Iowa City, Iowa (City)
69	Scott Rickard*	OL	6-3	274	Sr.	Garland, Texas (South Garland/Tyler JC)
70	Ben Beaudet***	OL	6-4	286	Sr.#	Lake Elmo, Minnesota (Stillwater)
71	Mitch Ehrenfelt	OL	6-4	300	Fr.#	Richland, Iowa (Pekin Community)
73	Ross Dean	OL	6-5	256	Fr.#	Oskaloosa, Iowa (Oskaloosa)
74	Ryan Terpening	OL	6-7	260	Fr.	Farmington, Minnesota (Farmington)
75	Marcel Howard**	OL	6-6	313	Jr.#	Davenport, Iowa (Central)
76	Lorenzo White	OL	6-5	340	Jr.	Richmond, Texas (Lamar Consolidated/Blinn JC)
77	Brian Donahue*	OL	6-5	273	Jr.#	Chicago, Illinois (De La Salle)
78	T.J. Woods	OL	6-5	303	Jr.	San Dimas, California (San Dimas/Citrus JC)
79	Matt Bockes	OL	6-0	257	Fr.#	Grundy Center, Iowa (Grundy Center)
80	Andy Stensrud***	OL	6-7	280	Sr.	Lake Mills, Iowa (Lake Mills)
81	Josh Stensrud	TE	6-3	241	So.#	Waseca, Minnesota (Waseca)
82	Lane Danielsen	WR	6-0	197	Fr.#	Grundy Center, Iowa (Dike-New Hartford)
83	Jamaul Montgomery	WR	5-11	190	Fr.#	Long Beach, California (St. John Bosco)
84	Jason Lyftogt*	TE	6-4	253	Jr.#	Orange City, Iowa (MOC-FV)
85	DeAndre Phillips	WR	5-11	185	Fr.	Mission Hills, California (Monroe)
86	Chris Anthony***^{C}	WR	6-3	204	Sr.	Bettendorf, Iowa (Pleasant Valley)
87	Steve Pfaller	WR	6-3	195	Fr.	Iowa City, Iowa (Iowa City)
88	Tom Kucera	WR	6-2	200	So.#	Atlantic, Iowa (Atlantic)
89	Chinwuba Ikwuakor	DL	6-4	229	Fr.#	Arvada, Colorado (Pomona)
89	Mitch Kennedy	OL	6-3	240	Fr.	Atlantic, Iowa (CAM)
90	Casey Shelton	DE	6-6	275	Fr.#	West Des Moines, Iowa (Valley)
91	Tim TeBrink	DE	6-3	245	Fr.	Alton, Iowa (MOC-Floyd Valley)
92	Jordan Carstens	DL	6-5	275	Fr.#	Bagley, Iowa (Panorama)
93	Kevin Costello	DL	6-3	235	Fr.#	West Des Moines, Iowa (Valley)
93	Kyle Knock	TE	6-2	250	So.#	Cedar Rapids, Iowa (Kennedy)
94	Aaron Howard	DL	6-1	222	Fr.#	Davenport, Iowa (Central)
95	Brent Braaksma	OL/TE	6-6	250	Jr.#	Sheldon, Iowa (Sheldon)
95	William Judd	DL	6-4	280	Jr.	Bonita, California (Bonita Vista/Butte JC)
96	Mike McKnight*	PK	6-2	209	Jr.#	Fort Dodge, Iowa (Fort Dodge)
96	Paul Jarrett	DL	6-4	230	Fr.	Lincoln, Nebraska (Pius X)
97	Shawn Sangster	DL	6-0	259	Fr.#	Virginia Beach, Virginia (Salem)
98	Nigel Tharpe***	DL	6-3	290	Sr.#	Detroit, Michigan (Redford)
98	Mitch Curtis	PK	6-1	238	Fr.#	Newton, Iowa (Newton)
99	Kevin DeRonde**	DE	6-5	255	Jr.#	Pella, Iowa (Pella)
99	Casey Baldwin	P	6-2	212	Fr.#	Perry, Iowa (Perry)

=== Coaching staff ===
Name	Position	Alma Mater (Year)
Dan McCarney	Head coach	Iowa (1975)
Bob Elliott	Assoc. Head Coach/Secondary & Special Teams Coordinator	Iowa (1975)
Nick Quartaro	Asst. Head Coach/Wide Receivers	Iowa (1977)
John Skladany	Defensive Coordinator/Linebackers	Central Connecticut State (1972)
Steve Loney	Offensive Coordinator/Offensive Line	Iowa State (1974)
Charlie Partridge	Director/Football Operations	Drake (1995)
Steve Brickey	Quarterbacks	Missouri (1976)
Mike Nelson	Defensive Line	Dayton (1969)
Tony Alford	Running Backs	Colorado State (1992)
Mike Woodley	Tight Ends	Northern Iowa (1974)
Mike Grant	Linebackers	Nebraska (1992)
Matt McGettigan	Strength & Conditioning	Luther (1987)

== Player statistics ==
=== Passing ===
Note: Att= Attempts; Cmp= Completions; PCT= Percent; Yds = Yards; Tds = Touchdowns; Int = Interceptions

Player	Att	Cmp	PCT	Yds	Tds	Int
Sage Rosenfels	366	194	53.0	2608	10	12
Gerrin Scott	4	3	75.0	61	1	0
Ennis Haywood	1	1	100.0	11	0	0
Lane Danielsen	1	0	0.0	0	0	1
Team	4	0	0.0	0	0	0
Total	376	198	52.7	2680	11	13

=== Rushing ===
Note: Att= Attempts; Yds = Yards; AVG = Average; Tds = Touchdowns

Player	Att	Yds	AVG	Tds
Ennis Haywood	250	1311	5.2	8
Michael Wagner	86	398	4.6	5
Sage Rosenfels	87	363	4.2	10
J.J. Moses	19	150	7.9	2
Hiawatha Rutland	18	128	7.1	0
Joe Woodley	9	19	2.1	3
Jamaine Billups	1	3	3.0	0
Casey Baldwin	1	-2	-2.0	0
Gerrin Scott	4	-4	-1.0	0
Team	6	-11	-1.8	0
Total	481	2355	4.9	28

=== Receiving ===
Note: Rec= Receptions; Yds = Yards; AVG = Average; Tds = Touchdowns

Player	Rec	Yds	AVG	Tds
J.J. Moses	57	840	14.74	4
Chris Anthony	40	520	13.00	3
Mike Banks	27	278	12.30	0
Ennis Haywood	26	226	8.69	0
Craig Campbell	25	415	16.60	1
Lane Danielsen	8	184	23.00	2
Jamaul Montgomery	5	108	21.60	0
Kyle Knock	5	72	14.40	0
Michael Wagner	2	14	7.00	1
Josh Stensrud	1	8	8.00	0
Jack Whitver	1	8	8.00	0
Hiawatha Rutland	1	7	7.00	0
Total	198	2680	13.54	11

=== Scoring ===
Note: TDs = Touchdowns; Rush = Rushing; Rec = Receiving; Ret = Return; PTS = Points

Player	TDs	Rush	Rec	Ret	PTS
Sage Rosenfels	10	10	0	0	60
Ennis Haywood	8	8	0	0	48
Michael Wagner	6	5	1	0	36
J.J. Moses	6	2	4	0	36
Chris Anthony	3	0	3	0	18
Lane Danielsen	3	0	2	1	18
Joe Woodley	3	3	0	0	18
Jamaine Billups	1	0	0	1	6
Craig Campbell	1	0	1	0	6
Jamarcus Powers	1	0	0	1	6
Marc Timmons	1	0	0	1	6
Total	43	28	11	4	258

=== Kicking ===
Note: Pat = Point after touchdown; FG = Field goal; PTS = Points

Player	Pat	FG	PTS
Carl Gomez	16	8	40
Mike Mcknight	16	7	37
Total	32	15	77

== Awards ==
Award	Name(s)
Reuben J. Miller Award	Chris Anthony, WR
Al and Dean Knudson Award	James Reed, DT
Bill Daily Award	Doug Densmore, DB; Ryan Sloth, DB
Ralph Aulmann Memorial Award	Chris Anthony, WR; Ryan Harklau, DL; Reggie Hayward, DE; Sage Rosenfels, QB
Dury Moss Award	Lorenzo White, OG
Ray Scott Award	Sage Rosenfels, QB; J.J. Moses, WR
Arthur Floyd Scott Award	Ben Bruns, OL; Reggie Hayward, DL
Jim Doran Award	Carl Gomez
The Consideration Award	J.J. Moses, WR
Scout Team Players of The Year	Brett Kellogg, LB; Eric Perry, QB
Sports Illustrated All-Bowl Team	
All-American 1st Team	
All-American 2nd Team	
All-Big 12 1st team	Ennis Haywood, RB; J.J. Moses, KR
All-Big 12 2nd team	Ben Bruns, C; J.J. Moses, WR; Reggie Hayward, DE/OLB
All-Big 12 3rd team	James Reed, DL; Jamarcus Powers, DB
All-Big 12 Honorable Mention	Sage Rosenfels, QB; Chris Anthony, WR; Andy Stensrud, OL; Mike Banks, TE; Dustin Avey, DB
All-Big 12 Academic 1st team	Dustin Avey, DB; Jordan Carstens, DL; Scott Davis, OL; Nick Hein, DB; Mike McKnight, PK; Sage Rosenfels, QB; Jamie Burkhead, DB; Adam Runk, DB; Ryan Sloth, DB; Eric Weiford, DL
All-Big 12 Academic 2nd team	Ben Bruns, Craig Campbell, Lane Danielson, Marcel Howard
Big 12 player of the week	QB Sage Rosenfels vs. Iowa, Sept. 16; RB Ennis Haywood vs. Baylor, Oct. 2

== NFL players ==
- Reggie Hayward, 2001 third-round draft pick of the Denver Broncos
- Sage Rosenfels, 2001 fourth-round draft pick of the Washington Redskins
- James Reed, 2001 Seventh-round draft pick of the New York Jets
- Mike Banks, 2002 Seventh-round draft pick of the Arizona Cardinals
- J.J. Moses, Green Bay Packers
- Ennis Haywood, Dallas Cowboys
- Tony Yelk, Atlanta Falcons
- Jordan Carstens, Carolina Panthers
- Tyson Smith, New York Giants
