= 2000 Big 12 Conference football season =

American college football season

- League: NCAA Division I–A
- Sport: football
- Teams: 12
- TV partner(s): ABC, FSN

2001 NFL Draft
- Top draft pick: Leonard Davis (Texas)
- Picked by: Arizona Cardinals, 2nd overall

Regular season
- North champions: Kansas State Wildcats
- South champions: Oklahoma Sooners

Big 12 Championship Game
- Champions: Oklahoma Sooners

Football seasons

2000 Big 12 Conference football standings
	Conf.			Overall
Team	W		L	W		L
North Division
No. 9 Kansas State xy	6	–	2	11	–	3
No. 8 Nebraska x	6	–	2	10	–	2
No. 25 Iowa State	5	–	3	9	–	3
Colorado	3	–	5	3	–	8
Kansas	2	–	6	4	–	7
Missouri	2	–	6	3	–	8
South Division
No. 1 Oklahoma x$#	8	–	0	13	–	0
No. 12 Texas	7	–	1	9	–	3
Texas A&M	5	–	3	7	–	5
Texas Tech	3	–	5	7	–	6
Oklahoma State	1	–	7	3	–	8
Baylor	0	–	8	2	–	9
Championship: Oklahoma 27, Kansas State 24
# – BCS National Champion; $ – BCS representative as conference champion; x – Division champion/co-champions; y – Championship game participant; Rankings from AP Poll

The 2000 Big 12 Conference football season represented the 5th season of Big 12 conference football, taking place during the 2000 NCAA Division I-A football season. The season began with non-conference play on Saturday, August 26, 2000. Conference play began on Saturday, September 30, 2000.

At the conclusion of the regular season, Kansas State won the North Division championship with a 11–3 (6–2) record. Oklahoma finished atop the South Division standings, with a perfect regular season 11–0 (8–0).

In the 2000 Big 12 Championship Game, the Oklahoma Sooners, narrowly beat the Kansas State Wildcats by a score of 27–24 in Kansas City, Missouri. With the win, the Sooners advance to the BCS National Championship Game. Kansas State was placed in the Cotton Bowl Classic. A total of 7 Big 12 teams went to bowl games in 2000.

Oklahoma won the BCS National Championship Game at the 2001 Orange Bowl, defeating Florida State, 13–2, in Miami Gardens.

== Head coaches ==
Team	Head coach	Years at school
Baylor	Kevin Steele	2nd
Colorado	Gary Barnett	2nd
Iowa State	Dan McCarney	6th
Kansas	Terry Allen	4th
Kansas State	Bill Snyder	12th
Missouri	Larry Smith	7th
Nebraska	Frank Solich	3rd
Oklahoma	Bob Stoops	2nd
Oklahoma State	Bob Simmons	6th
Texas	Mack Brown	3rd
Texas A&M	R. C. Slocum	12th
Texas Tech	Mike Leach	1st

== Regular season ==
=== Week 1 ===
Date	Time	Visiting team	Home team	Site	TV	Result	Attendance	Ref.
August 26	1:00 p.m.	Iowa	No. 10 Kansas State	Arrowhead Stadium • Kansas City, MO (Eddie Robinson Classic)	ABC	W 27–7	77,148	
August 26	7:00 p.m.	New Mexico	Texas Tech	Jones SBC Stadium • Lubbock, TX (Hispanic College Fund Football Classic)	FSN	W 24–3	42,238	
^{#}Rankings from AP Poll released prior to game. All times are in Central Time.

Date	Bye Week									
August 26	Baylor	Colorado	Iowa State	Kansas	Missouri	Nebraska	Oklahoma	Oklahoma State	Texas	Texas A&M

=== Week 2 ===
Date	Time	Visiting team	Home team	Site	TV	Result	Attendance	Ref.
August 31	7:00 p.m.	Baylor	North Texas	Fouts Field • Denton, TX	FSN	W 20–7	28,315	
September 2	11:00 a.m.	No. 25 Texas A&M	Notre Dame	Notre Dame Stadium • Notre Dame, IN	NBC	L 10–24	80,232	
September 2	11:30 a.m.	San Jose State	No. 1 Nebraska	Memorial Stadium • Lincoln, NE	PPV	W 49–13	77,728	
September 2	11:30 a.m.	Ohio	Iowa State	Jack Trice Stadium • Ames, IA	FSN	W 25–15	34,385	
September 2	6:00 p.m.	Colorado State	No. 23 Colorado	Mile High Stadium • Denver, CO	ESPN2	L 24–28	67,587	
September 2	6:00 p.m.	Kansas	SMU	Gerald J. Ford Stadium • University Park, TX		L 17–31	32,267	
September 2	6:00 p.m.	Louisiana Tech	No. 8 Kansas State	KSU Stadium • Manhattan, KS	FSN	W 54–10	48,902	
September 2	6:30 p.m.	UTEP	No. 19 Oklahoma	Oklahoma Memorial Stadium • Norman, OK	FSN PPV	W 55–14	74,761	
September 2	6:20 p.m.	Western Illinois	Missouri	Faurot Field • Columbia, MO		W 50–20	53,224	
September 2	6:30 p.m.	Utah State	Texas Tech	Jones SBC Stadium • Lubbock, TX		W 38–16	35,913	
^{#}Rankings from AP Poll released prior to game. All times are in Central Time.

Date	Bye Week	
September 2	Oklahoma State	Texas

=== Week 3 ===
Date	Time	Visiting team	Home team	Site	TV	Result	Attendance	Ref.
September 9	11:30 a.m.	Minnesota	Baylor	Floyd Casey Stadium • Waco, TX	FSN	L 9–34	20,125	
September 9	11:30 a.m.	Louisiana–Lafayette	No. 6 Texas	Darrell K Royal–Texas Memorial Stadium • Austin, TX	FSSW	W 52–10	80,017	
September 9	1:00 p.m.	UNLV	Iowa State	Jack Trice Stadium • Ames, IA		W 37–22	35,408	
September 9	1:30 p.m.	No. 1 Nebraska	No. 23 Notre Dame	Notre Dame Stadium • Notre Dame, IN	NBC	W 27–24 (OT)	80,232	
September 9	2:30 p.m.	Missouri	No. 17 Clemson	Memorial Stadium • Clemson, SC	ABC	L 9–62	70,382	
September 9	6:00 p.m.	Oklahoma State	Tulsa	Skelly Stadium • Tulsa, OK (rivalry)		W 36–26	40,385	
September 9	6:00 p.m.	Texas A&M	Wyoming	Kyle Field • College Station, TX	FSN	W 51–3	69,273	
September 9	6:30 p.m.	Arkansas State	No. 20 Oklahoma	Oklahoma Memorial Stadium • Norman, OK	FSN PPV	W 45–7	74,730	
September 9	7:00 p.m.	Colorado	No. 11 USC	Los Angeles Memorial Coliseum • Los Angeles, CA	ABC	L 14–17	65,153	
^{#}Rankings from AP Poll released prior to game. All times are in Central Time.

Date	Bye Week		
September 9	Baylor	Kansas	Kansas State

=== Week 4 ===
Date	Time	Visiting team	Home team	Site	TV	Result	Attendance	Ref.
September 16	11:00 a.m.	Iowa State	Iowa	Kinnick Stadium • Iowa City, IA	ESPN	W 24–14	70,397	
September 16	2:30 p.m.	No. 9 Washington	Colorado	Folsom Field • Boulder, CO	ABC	L 14–17	50,454	
September 16	6:00 p.m.	South Florida	Baylor	Floyd Casey Stadium • Waco, TX		W 28–13	21,157	
September 16	6:00 p.m.	Michigan State	Missouri	Faurot Field • Columbia, MO	FSN	L 10–13	55,289	
September 16	7:00 p.m.	Southwest Texas State	Oklahoma State	Lewis Field • Stillwater, OK		W 23–0	40,050	
September 16	7:00 p.m.	UTEP	Texas A&M	Kyle Field • College Station, TX		W 45–17	69,184	
September 16	9:15 p.m.	No. 5 Texas	Stanford	Stanford Stadium • Stanford, CA	FSN	L 24–27	43,970	
^{#}Rankings from AP Poll released prior to game. All times are in Central Time.

Date	Bye Week	
September 16	Nebraska	Oklahoma

=== Week 5 ===
Date	Time	Visiting team	Home team	Site	TV	Result	Attendance	Ref.
September 23	11:30 a.m.	Rice	No. 17 Oklahoma	Oklahoma Memorial Stadium • Norman, OK	FSN	W 42–14	74,794	
September 23	2:30 p.m.	Iowa	No. 1 Nebraska	Memorial Stadium • Lincoln, NE	ABC	W 42–13	78,070	
September 23	6:00 p.m.	South Florida	Baylor	Floyd Casey Stadium • Waco, TX		W 28–13	21,157	
September 23	6:00 p.m.	Houston	No. 15 Texas	Darrell K Royal–Texas Memorial Stadium • Austin, TX	FSN	W 48–0	81,592	
September 23	7:00 p.m.	No. 22 Southern Miss	Oklahoma State	Lewis Field • Stillwater, OK		L 6–28	41,205	
^{#}Rankings from AP Poll released prior to game. All times are in Central Time.

Date	Bye Week				
September 23	Colorado	Iowa State	Missouri	Texas A&M	Texas Tech

=== Week 6 ===
Date	Time	Visiting team	Home team	Site	TV	Result	Attendance	Ref.
September 30	11:30 a.m.	Texas Tech	Texas A&M	Kyle Field • College Station, TX (rivalry)	FSN	TAMU 33–15	83,644	
September 30	2:00 p.m.	Kansas	No. 14 Oklahoma	Oklahoma Memorial Stadium • Norman, OK		OU 34–16	74,811	
September 30	2:30 p.m.	No. 5 Kansas State	Colorado	Folsom Field • Boulder, CO	ABC	KSU 44–21	51,896	
September 30	6:00 p.m.	Iowa State	Baylor	Floyd Casey Stadium • Waco, TX		ISU 31–17	31,126	
September 30	6:00 p.m.	Missouri	No. 1 Nebraska	Memorial Stadium • Lincoln, NE (rivalry)	FSN	NEB 42–24	77,744	
^{#}Rankings from AP Poll released prior to game. All times are in Central Time.

=== Week 7 ===
Date	Time	Visiting team	Home team	Site	TV	Result	Attendance	Ref.
October 7	11:00 a.m.	No. 11 Texas	No. 10 Oklahoma	Cotton Bowl • Dallas, TX (Red River Shootout)	ABC	OU 63–14	75,587	
October 7	1:00 p.m.	Colorado	Texas A&M	Kyle Field • College Station, TX		CU 26–19	75,523	
October 7	1:00 p.m.	Oklahoma State	Missouri	Faurot Field • Columbia, MO		MIZ 24–10	51,149	
October 7	2:30 p.m.	No. 2 Nebraska	Iowa State	Jack Trice Stadium • Ames, IA	ABC	NEB 49–27	50,074	
October 7	6:00 p.m.	Baylor	Texas Tech	Jones SBC Stadium • Lubbock, TX (rivalry)		TT 28–0	40,209	
^{#}Rankings from AP Poll released prior to game. All times are in Central Time.

=== Week 8 ===
Date	Time	Visiting team	Home team	Site	TV	Result	Attendance	Ref.
October 14	11:30 a.m.	Texas A&M	Baylor	Floyd Casey Stadium • Waco, TX (Battle of the Brazos)	FSN	TAMU 24–0	40,076	
October 14	1:00 p.m.	Kansas	Missouri	Faurot Field • Columbia, MO (Border War)		KU 38–14	61,794	
October 14	2:30 p.m.	No. 25 Texas	Colorado	Folsom Field • Boulder, CO		TEX 28–14	52,030	
October 14	2:30 p.m.	No. 8 Oklahoma	No. 2 Kansas State	KSU Stadium • Manhattan, KS	ABC	OU 41–31	53,011	
October 14	6:00 p.m.	No. 1 Nebraska	Texas Tech	Jones SBC Stadium • Lubbock, TX	FSN	NEB 56–3	48,961	
October 14	7:00 p.m.	Iowa State	Oklahoma State	Lewis Stadium • Stillwater, OK		ISU 33–26	41,310	
^{#}Rankings from AP Poll released prior to game. All times are in Central Time.

=== Week 9 ===
Date	Time	Visiting team	Home team	Site	TV	Result	Attendance	Ref.
October 21	11:30 a.m.	Colorado	Kansas	Kansas Memorial Stadium • Lawrence, KS	FSN	KU 23–15	32,600	
October 21	12:30 p.m	Baylor	No. 1 Nebraska	Memorial Stadium • Lincoln, NE		NEB 59–0	77,959	
October 21	1:30 p.m.	Missouri	Texas	Darrel K Royal–Texas Memorial Stadium • Austin, TX		TEX 46–12	82,892	
October 21	2:30 p.m.	Texas A&M	Iowa State	Jack Trice Stadium • Ames, IA	ABC	TAMU 41–20	48,931	
^{#}Rankings from AP Poll released prior to game. All times are in Central Time.

Date	Bye Week	
October 21	Oklahoma	Oklahoma State

=== Week 10 ===
Date	Time	Visiting team	Home team	Site	TV	Result	Attendance	Ref.
October 28	11:00 a.m.	No. 1 Nebraska	No. 3 Oklahoma	Oklahoma Memorial Stadium • Norman, OK (rivalry)	ABC	OU 31–14	75,989	
October 28	11:30 a.m.	Baylor	No. 22 Texas	Darrell K Royal–Texas Memorial Stadium • Austin, TX	FSN	TEX 48–14	83,092	
October 28	2:30 p.m.	Oklahoma State	Colorado	Folsom Field • Boulder, CO		CU 37–21	49,148	
October 28	2:30 p.m.	No. 10 Kansas State	Texas A&M	Kyle Field • College Station, TX	ABC	TAMU 26–10	80,659	
October 28	6:00 p.m.	Missouri	Iowa State	Jack Trice Stadium • Ames, IA (Telephone Trophy)	FSN	ISU 39–20	46,599	
^{#}Rankings from AP Poll released prior to game. All times are in Central Time.

=== Week 11 ===
Date	Time	Visiting team	Home team	Site	TV	Result	Attendance	Ref.
November 4	11:30 a.m.	Iowa State	Kansas State	KSU Stadium • Manhattan, KS	FSN	KSU 56–10	50,114	
November 4	1:00 p.m.	Colorado	Missouri	Faurot Field • Columbia, MO		CU 28–18	50,567	
November 4	1:00 p.m.	No. 1 Oklahoma	Baylor	Floyd Casey Stadium • Waco, TX		OU 56–7	31,106	
November 4	1:00 p.m.	No. 24 Texas A&M	Oklahoma State	Lewis Field • Stillwater, OK		TAMU 21–16	36,310	
November 4	2:30 p.m.	Kansas	No. 5 Nebraska	Memorial Stadium • Lincoln, NE	ABC	NEB 56–17	78,096	
^{#}Rankings from AP Poll released prior to game. All times are in Central Time.

=== Week 12 ===
Date	Time	Visiting team	Home team	Site	TV	Result	Attendance	Ref.
November 11	12:00 p.m.	No. 1 Oklahoma	No. 23 Texas A&M	Kyle Field • College Station, TX	ABC	OU 35–31	87,188	
November 11	1:00 p.m.	Missouri	Baylor	Floyd Casey Stadium • Waco, TX		MIZ 47–22	29,872	
November 11	2:30 p.m.	Iowa State	Colorado	Folsom Field • Boulder, CO	FSN	ISU 35–27	46,430	
November 11	6:00 p.m.	No. 4 Nebraska	No. 16 Kansas State	KSU Stadium • Manhattan, KS	FSN	KSU 29–28	53,811	
^{#}Rankings from AP Poll released prior to game. All times are in Central Time.

=== Week 13 ===
Date	Time	Visiting team	Home team	Site	TV	Result	Attendance	Ref.
November 18	11:30 a.m.	No. 9 Kansas State	Missouri	Faurot Field • Columbia, MO	FSN	KSU 28–24	49,277	
November 18	1:00 p.m.	Baylor	Oklahoma State	Lewis Field • Stillwater, OK		OKST 50–22	31,500	
November 18	1:00 p.m.	Kansas	Iowa State	Jack Trice Stadium • Ames, IA		ISU 38–17	36,725	
November 18	2:30 p.m.	Texas Tech	No. 1 Oklahoma	Oklahoma Memorial Stadium • Norman, OK	ABC	OU 27–13	75,364	
^{#}Rankings from AP Poll released prior to game. All times are in Central Time.

Date	Bye Week			
November 18	Colorado	Nebraska	Texas	Texas A&M

=== Week 14 ===
Date	Time	Visiting team	Home team	Site	TV	Result	Attendance	Ref.
November 24	11:00 a.m.	Colorado	No. 10 Nebraska	Memorial Stadium • Lincoln, NE (rivalry)	ABC	NEB 34–32	77,672	
November 24	2:30 p.m.	No. 21 Texas A&M	No. 12 Texas	Darrell K Royal–Texas Memorial Stadium • Austin, TX (rivalry)	ABC	TEX 43–17	84,012	
November 25	2:30 p.m.	No. 1 Oklahoma	Oklahoma State	Lewis Field • Stillwater, OK (Bedlam Series)	FSN	OU 12–7	48,500	
^{#}Rankings from AP Poll released prior to game. All times are in Central Time.

Date	Bye Week					
November 25	Baylor	Iowa State	Kansas	Kansas State	Missouri	Texas Tech

=== Championship Game ===
Date	Time	Visiting team	Home team	Site	TV	Result	Attendance	Ref.
December 2	7:00 p.m.	No. 8 Kansas State	No. 1 Oklahoma	Arrowhead Stadium • Kansas City, Missouri	ABC	OU 27–24	79,655	
^{#}Rankings from AP Poll released prior to game. All times are in Central Time.

== Bowl Games ==
=== Bowl games ===
Legend
Big 12 win
Big 12 loss

Bowl game	Date	Site	Television	Time (CST)	Big 12 team	Opponent	Score	Attendance
Galleryfurniture.com Bowl	December 27, 2000	Astrodome • Houston, TX	ESPN	7:00 PM	Texas Tech	East Carolina	**L** 27–40	76,835
Insight.com Bowl	December 27, 2000	Bank One Ballpark • Phoenix, AZ	ESPN	7:30 PM	Iowa State	Pittsburgh	**W** 37–29	41,813
Holiday Bowl	December 29, 2000	Qualcomm Stadium • San Diego, CA	ESPN	8:30 PM	No. 12 Texas	No. 8 Oregon	**L** 30–35	60,028
Alamo Bowl	December 30, 2000	Alamodome • San Antonio, TX	ESPN	8:00 PM	No. 9 Nebraska	No. 18 Northwestern	**W** 66–17	60,028
Independence Bowl	December 31, 2000	Independence Stadium • Shreveport, LA	ESPN	7:00 PM	Texas A&M	Mississippi State	**L** 41–43	36,974
Cotton Bowl	January 1, 2001	Cotton Bowl • Dallas, TX	FOX	7:00 PM	No. 11 Kansas State	No. 21 Tennessee	**W** 35–21	63,465
**BCS National Championship**
Orange Bowl	January 3, 2001	Pro Player Stadium • Miami Gardens, FL	ABC	7:00 PM	No. 1 Oklahoma	No. 3 Florida State	**W** 13–2	76,835

Rankings are from AP rankings. All times Central Time Zone. Big 12 teams shown in bold.
