= 2000 Big 12 Championship Game =

- Conference Championship sponsored by Dr Pepper
- 2000 Big 12 Championship logo.
Kansas State Wildcats	Oklahoma Sooners
(10–2)	(11–0)
24	27
Head coach: Bill Snyder	Head coach: Bob Stoops
AP / Coaches / BCS; 8 / 7 / 9	AP / Coaches / BCS; 1 / 1 / 1
	1	2	3	4	Total
Kansas State	0	10	7	7	24
Oklahoma	3	7	7	10	27
- Date: December 2, 2000
- Season: 2000
- Stadium: Arrowhead Stadium
- Location: Kansas City, Missouri
- Referee: Randy Christal
- Attendance: 79,655

United States TV coverage
- Network: ABC
- Announcers: Brad Nessler (play-by-Play); Bob Griese (analyst); Jack Arute and Lynn Swann (sideline)

2000 Big 12 Conference football standings
	Conf.			Overall
Team	W		L	W		L
North Division
No. 9 Kansas State xy	6	–	2	11	–	3
No. 8 Nebraska x	6	–	2	10	–	2
No. 25 Iowa State	5	–	3	9	–	3
Colorado	3	–	5	3	–	8
Kansas	2	–	6	4	–	7
Missouri	2	–	6	3	–	8
South Division
No. 1 Oklahoma x$#	8	–	0	13	–	0
No. 12 Texas	7	–	1	9	–	3
Texas A&M	5	–	3	7	–	5
Texas Tech	3	–	5	7	–	6
Oklahoma State	1	–	7	3	–	8
Baylor	0	–	8	2	–	9
Championship: Oklahoma 27, Kansas State 24
# – BCS National Champion; $ – BCS representative as conference champion; x – Division champion/co-champions; y – Championship game participant; Rankings from AP Poll

The 2000 Big 12 Football Championship Game was a college football game played on Saturday, December 2, 2000, at Arrowhead Stadium in Kansas City, Missouri. The game determined the 2000 champion of the Big 12 Conference. The game, the 5th Big 12 Championship, featured the Kansas State Wildcats, champions of the North division, and the Oklahoma Sooners, champions of the South division.

== Teams ==
The 2000 Championship game was contested by Kansas State and Oklahoma. Oklahoma defeated Kansas State 41–31 in their regular season match-up in Manhattan.

=== Oklahoma ===
Oklahoma booked their place in the Championship Game by winning the South Division with a record of 11–0 (8–0 Big 12). This was Oklahomas's first appearance in a Big 12 Championship Game.

== Game summary ==
In a scene filled with national championship tension and with two teams very familiar with one another, No. 1 Oklahoma edged No. 7/8 Kansas State, 27-24, for the Sooners’ first Big 12 football title.

As OU won a school-record 12th game and advanced to the Bowl Championship Series, the battle royale was about as even as pre-billed for the first 30 minutes.

The Sooners scored first in what would prove to be the decisive field goal in the three-point victory as Tim Duncan connected on a 33-yarder.

K-State then rallied for 10 unanswered points, starting with a 10-yard scoring run by Jonathan Beasley on the first play of the second quarter. After an OU punt, KSU mounted a 12-play, 57-yard drive for a Jamie Rheem field goal from 22 yards.

Oklahoma stormed back to block a Wildcats’ punt as Josh Norman stepped in front of a KSU boot. Three plays later, quarterback Josh Heupel connected with tight end Trent Smith for one of Smith’s record eight championship receptions and the tying touchdown with 2:56 left in the half.

In the second half, OU took a short-lived lead at 17-10 with 5:54 left in the third quarter as Heupel rushed over the goal line from seven yards. Less than two minutes later, Aaron Lockett cruised 58 yards on a punt runback for the first kick return for a touchdown in the Big 12 Championship.

Late in the third quarter and early in the final period, OU made the critical drive of the game. Heupel found Andre Woolfolk with a pass to the back of the end zone, and Duncan’s kick made it 24-17 Sooners with 14:24 left in regulation.

A calculated gamble by Bob Stoops and Sooners’ special teams’ coaches sent Duncan out to try his longest field goal of the season - a 46-yarder - with 1:25 on the clock. Duncan’s successful try was his longest of the year by six yards and gave Oklahoma just enough breathing room.

The elusive Beasley drove the Wildcats 60 yards in six plays in a span of 1:19. Oklahoma scooped up the ensuing onside kick and ran the final six seconds off the clock. For the fifth year in succession, the designated home team was victorious in the Dr Pepper Championship.

2000 Dr Pepper Big 12 Championship Game

Quarter	1	2	3	4	Total
No. 9 Kansas State	0	10	7	7	24
No. 1 Oklahoma	3	7	7	10	27

at Arrowhead Stadium • Kansas City, Missouri

- Date: December 2, 2000
- Game time: 7:00 p.m. CST
- Game attendance: 79,655
- Referee: Randy Christal
- TV announcers (ABC): Brad Nessler (Play by Play), Bob Griese (Analyst), Jack Arute and Lynn Swann (Sideline)

Game information

First quarter

- OKLA (3-0) - Tim Duncan 33-yard field goal; 7:16

Second quarter

- KSU (3-7) - Jonathan Beasley 10-yard run (Jamie Rheem kick); 14:54
- KSU (3-10) - Rheem 22-yard field goal; 7:58
- OKLA (10-10) - Trent Smith 1-yard pass from Josh Heupel (Duncan kick); 2:56

Third quarter

- OKLA (17-10) - Josh Heupel 7-yard run (Duncan kick); 5:54
- KSU (17-17) - Aaron Lockett 58-yard punt return (Rheem kick)

Fourth quarter

- OKLA (24-17) - Andre Woolfolk 17-yard pass from Heupel (Duncan kick); 14:24
- OKLA (27-17) - Duncan 46-yard field goal; 1:25
- KSU (27-24) - Quincy Morgan 16-yard pass from Beasley (Rheem kick); 0:06

=== Statistics ===
Statistics	KSU	OKLA
First downs		
Plays–yards		
Rushes–yards		
Passing yards		
Passing: comp–att–int		
Time of possession		

Team	Category	Player	Statistics
Kansas State	Passing		
Kansas State	Rushing		
Kansas State	Receiving		
Oklahoma	Passing		
Oklahoma	Rushing		
Oklahoma	Receiving		

== After the game ==
The Sooners went on to play in the 2001 Orange Bowl and won their 7th national championship against the Florida State Seminoles, 13-2.

Kansas State went on to beat the Tennessee Volunteers in the 2001 Cotton Bowl Classic, 35 to 21.
