= 2000 Kansas State Wildcats football team =

American college football season

2000 Kansas State Wildcats football

Big 12 North co-champion Cotton Bowl Classic champion

Big 12 Championship Game, L 24–27 vs. Oklahoma

Cotton Bowl Classic, W 35–21 vs. Tennessee
- Conference: Big 12 Conference
- North Division

Ranking
- Coaches: No. 8
- AP: No. 9
- Record: 11–3 (6–2 Big 12)
- Head coach: Bill Snyder (12th season)
- Offensive coordinator: Ron Hudson (4th season)
- Offensive scheme: Pro-style
- Defensive coordinator: Phil Bennett (2nd season)
- Base defense: 4–3
- Home stadium: KSU Stadium

2000 Big 12 Conference football standings
	Conf.			Overall
Team	W		L	W		L
North Division
No. 9 Kansas State xy	6	–	2	11	–	3
No. 8 Nebraska x	6	–	2	10	–	2
No. 25 Iowa State	5	–	3	9	–	3
Colorado	3	–	5	3	–	8
Kansas	2	–	6	4	–	7
Missouri	2	–	6	3	–	8
South Division
No. 1 Oklahoma x$#	8	–	0	13	–	0
No. 12 Texas	7	–	1	9	–	3
Texas A&M	5	–	3	7	–	5
Texas Tech	3	–	5	7	–	6
Oklahoma State	1	–	7	3	–	8
Baylor	0	–	8	2	–	9
Championship: Oklahoma 27, Kansas State 24
# – BCS National Champion; $ – BCS representative as conference champion; x – Division champion/co-champions; y – Championship game participant; Rankings from AP Poll

The 2000 Kansas State Wildcats football team represented Kansas State University as a member of the North Division of the Big 12 Conference during the 2000 NCAA Division I-A football season. Led by 12th-year head coach Bill Snyder, the Wildcats compiled an overall record of 11–3 with a mark of 6–2 in conference play, sharing Big 12's North Division title with Nebraska. By virtue of a head-to-head win over the Cornhuskers, Kansas State advanced to the Big 12 Championship Game, where the Wildcats lost to the eventual national champion, Oklahoma. Kansas State was then invited to the Cotton Bowl Classic, defeating Tennessee in the game. The team played home games at KSU Stadium in Manhattan, Kansas.

== Schedule ==
Date	Time	Opponent	Rank	Site	TV	Result	Attendance	Source
August 26	1:00 p.m.	vs. Iowa*	No. 8	Arrowhead Stadium; Kansas City, MO (Eddie Robinson Classic)	FSN	W 27–7	77,148	
September 2	6:00 p.m.	Louisiana Tech*	No. 8	KSU Stadium; Manhattan, KS	FSN	W 54–10	48,902	
September 16	6:00 p.m.	Ball State*	No. 7	KSU Stadium; Manhattan, KS		W 76–0	46,916	
September 23	1:00 p.m.	North Texas*	No. 4	KSU Stadium; Manhattan, KS		W 55–10	47,926	
September 30	2:30 p.m.	at Colorado	No. 5	Folsom Field; Boulder, CO (rivalry)	ABC	W 44–21	51,896	
October 7	1:00 p.m.	at Kansas	No. 4	Memorial Stadium; Lawrence, KS (rivalry)		W 52–13	48,500	
October 14	2:30 p.m.	No. 8 Oklahoma	No. 2	KSU Stadium; Manhattan, KS (College GameDay)	ABC	L 31–41	53,011	
October 21	6:00 p.m.	Texas Tech^{†}	No. 10	KSU Stadium; Manhattan, KS	FSN	W 28–23	51,140	
October 28	2:30 p.m.	at Texas A&M	No. 10	Kyle Field; College Station, TX	ABC	L 10–26	80,659	
November 4	11:30 a.m.	Iowa State	No. 19	KSU Stadium; Manhattan, KS (rivalry)	FSN	W 56–10	50,114	
November 11	6:00 p.m.	No. 4 Nebraska	No. 16	KSU Stadium; Manhattan, KS (rivalry)	FSN	W 29–28	53,811	
November 18	11:30 a.m.	at Missouri	No. 9	Faurot Field; Columbia, MO	FSN	W 28–24	49,277	
December 2	7:00 p.m.	vs. No. 1 Oklahoma	No. 8	Arrowhead Stadium; Kansas City, MO (Big 12 Championship Game, College GameDay)	ABC	L 24–27	79,655	
January 1	10:00 a.m.	vs. No. 21 Tennessee*	No. 11	Cotton Bowl; Dallas, TX (Cotton Bowl Classic)	FOX	W 35–21	63,465	
*Non-conference game; ^{†}Homecoming; Rankings from AP Poll released prior to the game; All times are in Central time

== Rankings ==
Ranking movements Legend: ██ Increase in ranking ██ Decrease in ranking — = Not ranked ( ) = First-place votes
	Week																
Poll	Pre	1	2	3	4	5	6	7	8	9	10	11	12	13	14	15	Final
AP	8	8	7	7	4 (1)	5 (1)	4 (1)	2 (3)	10	10	19	16	9	8	8	11	9
Coaches	9	9	7	7	5	5 (1)	4 (1)	3 (3)	8	8	15	11	9	7	7	9	8
BCS	Not released									10	—	11	10	9	9	9	Not released

== Game summaries ==
=== vs. Iowa ===
Iowa vs. No. 8 Kansas State

Team	1	2	3	4	Total
Hawkeyes	0	0	7	0	7
• No. 8 Wildcats	10	7	0	10	27

- Date: August 26
- Location: Arrowhead Stadium, Kansas City, Missouri
- Game start: 1:00 pm CDT
- Game attendance: 77,148
- Television network: FSN

Scoring summary
1	11:32	KSU	David Allen 1-yard run (Jamie Rheem kick)	KSU 7–0
1	3:35	KSU	Jamie Rheem 24-yard field goal	KSU 10–0
2	0:19	KSU	Quincy Morgan 4-yard pass from Jonathan Beasley (Jamie Rheem kick)	KSU 17–0
3	7:59	Iowa	Ladell Betts 1-yard run (Nate Kaeding kick)	KSU 17–7
4	5:03	KSU	Jonathan Beasley 8-yard run (Jamie Rheem kick)	KSU 24–7
4	1:38	KSU	Jamie Rheem 39-yard field goal	KSU 27–7

=== No. 8 Oklahoma ===
No. 8 Oklahoma Sooners at No. 2 Kansas State Wildcats

Team	1	2	3	4	Total
• No. 8 Oklahoma	17	14	7	3	41
No. 2 Kansas State	7	7	3	14	31

- Date: October 14
- Location: KSU Stadium, Manhattan, Kansas
- Game attendance: 53,011
- TV announcers (ABC): Brent Musburger (Play-by-play), Gary Danielson (Color), Jack Arute (Sideline)

=== Texas Tech ===
	1	2	3	4	Total
Red Raiders	0	9	7	7	23
No. 10 Wildcats	0	14	7	7	28

Statistics	TTU	KSU
First downs	22	18
Total yards	337	285
Rushing yards	35	125
Passing yards	302	160
Turnovers	2	2
Time of possession	29:17	30:43

Team	Category	Player	Statistics
Texas Tech	Passing	Kliff Kingsbury	29/60, 302 yards, TD, 2 INT
Texas Tech	Rushing	Ricky Williams	8 rushes, 26 yards, TD
Texas Tech	Receiving	Derek Dorris	9 receptions, 124 yards, TD
Kansas State	Passing	Jonathan Beasley	13/25, 160 yards, TD, 2 INT
Kansas State	Rushing	Rock Cartwright	7 rushes, 41 yards, TD
Kansas State	Receiving	Aaron Lockett	5 receptions, 58 yards

=== Texas A&M ===
	1	2	3	4	Total
Kansas State	0	0	10	0	10
Texas A&M	12	7	0	7	26

=== Iowa State ===
Game Nine: Iowa State Cyclones @ Kansas State Wildcats – Game summary

Quarter	1	2	3	4	Total
Cyclones	3	0	0	7	10
Wildcats	21	14	14	7	56

at KSU Stadium • Manhattan, Kansas

- Date: November 4
- Game time: 11:38 a.m. CST kickoff
- Game weather: Temperature: 59 Wind: S 5-15 Weather: Mostly sunny
- Game attendance: 50,114
- Referee: Referee: Jon Bible; Umpire: Bob Holliday; Linesman: David Alexander; Line judge: Gary Brown; Back judge: Ron Murphy; Field judge: Greg Burks; Side judge: Butch Clark
- TV announcers (FSN): Drew Goodman (Play-by-play), Dave Lapham (Color) & Jim Knox (Sideline)

Game information
Scoring Summary:

First Quarter

- 09:48 KSU – Scobey, Josh 2 yd run (Rheem, Jamie kick) 7 plays, 67 yards, TOP 3:03 ISU 0 – KSU 7
- 05:10 ISU – Gomez, Carl 30 yd field goal 11 plays, 67 yards, TOP 4:38 ISU 3 – KSU 7
- 04:18 KSU – Scobey, Josh 1 yd run (Rheem, Jamie kick) 4 plays, 64 yards, TOP 0:52 ISU 3 – KSU 14
- 01:21 KSU – Scobey, Josh 4 yd run (Rheem, Jamie kick) 4 plays, 50 yards, TOP 0:46 ISU 3 – KSU 21

Second Quarter

- 11:27 KSU – Claybon, Chris 8 yd run (Rheem, Jamie kick) 11 plays, 52 yards, TOP 4:22 ISU 3 – KSU 28
- 00:22 KSU – Morgan, Quincy 29 yd pass from Beasley, J. (Rheem, Jamie kick) 4 plays, 43 yards, TOP 0:44 ISU 3 – KSU 35

Third Quarter

- 09:45 KSU – Beasley, J. 1 yd run (Rheem, Jamie kick) 6 plays, 45 yards, TOP 2:38 ISU 3 – KSU 42
- 07:10 KSU – Scobey, Josh 11 yd run (Rheem, Jamie kick) 5 plays, 65 yards, TOP 1:27 ISU 3 – KSU 49

Fourth Quarter

- 11:17 ISU – Rosenfels, Sage 1 yd run (Gomez, Carl kick) 7 plays, 58 yards, TOP 3:32 ISU 10 – KSU 49
- 05:17 KSU – Clark, Brandon 23 yd pass from Roberson, Ell (Rheem, Jamie kick) 8 plays, 80 yards, TOP 2:19 ISU 10 – KSU 56

=== No. 4 Nebraska ===
No. 4 Nebraska Cornhuskers at No. 16 Kansas State Wildcats

Team	1	2	3	4	Total
No. 4 Cornhuskers	14	0	0	14	28
• No. 16 Wildcats	7	10	6	6	29

- Date: November 11
- Location: KSU Stadium, Manhattan, Kansas
- Game attendance: 53,811
- TV announcers (FSN): Ron Thulin (Play-by-play) & James Lofton (Color)

Scoring summary
Q1	12:55	NEB	Craver 12 yard blocked punt return (Brown kick)	NEB 7–0
Q1	5:21	KSU	Scobey 1 yard run (Rheem kick)	Tie 7–7
Q1	:31	NEB	Crouch 1 yard run (Brown kick)	NEB 14–7
Q2	2:42	KSU	Rheem 38 yard field goal	NEB 14–10
Q2	1:17	KSU	Morgan 49 yard pass from Beasley (Rheem kick)	KSU 17–14
Q3	11:41	KSU	Rheem 27 yard field goal	KSU 20–14
Q3	9:11	KSU	Rheem 29 yard field goal	KSU 23–14
Q4	14:02	NEB	Alexander 19 yard run (Brown kick)	KSU 23–21
Q4	9:53	NEB	Alexander 45 yard run (Brown kick)	NEB 28–23
Q4	2:52	KSU	Morgan 12 yard pass from Beasley (two-point conversion failed)	KSU 29–28

=== vs. No. 1 Oklahoma (Big 12 Championship Game) ===
No. 8 Kansas State Wildcats vs. No. 1 Oklahoma Sooners

Team	1	2	3	4	Total
No. 8 Wildcats	0	10	7	7	24
• No. 1 Sooners	3	7	7	10	27

- Date: December 2
- Location: Arrowhead Stadium, Kansas City, Missouri
- Game attendance: 79,655
- TV announcers (ABC): Brad Nessler (Play-by-play), Bob Griese (Color) & Jack Arute (Sideline)

=== vs. No. 21 Tennessee (Cotton Bowl Classic) ===
No. 21 Tennessee Volunteers vs. No. 11 Kansas State Wildcats

Team	1	2	3	4	Total
No. 21 Volunteers	0	14	0	7	21
• No. 11 Wildcats	7	14	14	0	35

- Date: January 1, 2001
- Location: Cotton Bowl, Dallas, Texas
- Game attendance: 63,465
- TV announcers (FOX): Thom Brennaman (Play-by-play), Tim Green (Color) & Dave Lapham (Sideline)

== Roster ==
2000 Kansas State Wildcats football team roster
Players
Coaches
Offense

Pos.	#	Name	Class
QB	18	Jonathan Beasley	Sr
OL	53	Nick Leckey	Fr
OL	64	Ryan Lilja	Fr
TE	85	Shad Meier	Sr
WR	5	Quincy Morgan	Sr
QB	3	Ell Roberson	Fr

Defense

Pos.	#	Name	Class
DE	44	Monty Beisel	Sr
CB	23	Jerametrius Butler	Jr
DB	35	Dyshod Carter	Sr
SS	40	Jarrod Cooper	Sr
LB	52	Ben Leber	Jr
FS	38	Jon McGraw	So
CB	4	Terence Newman	So
LB	56	Terry Pierce	So

Special teams

Pos.	#	Name	Class

Head coach

- Bill Snyder

Coordinators/assistant coaches

- Ron Hudson – Offensive Coordinator & quarterbacks
- Michael Smith – Running backs
- Greg Peterson – Wide receivers, passing game coordinator, & recruiting coordinator
- Matt Miller – Tight ends
- Paul Dunn – Offensive line
- Phil Bennett – Defensive Coordinator
- Mo Latimore – interior Defensive line
- Bob Fello – Defensive end & Special Teams Coordinator
- Jim Gush – Linebackers

Legend

- (C) Team captain
- (S) Suspended
- (I) Ineligible
- Injured
- Redshirt

== Statistics ==
=== Score by quarter ===
	1	2	3	4	Total
Kansas State	133	188	106	87	514
Opponents	72	61	37	70	240

=== Team ===
	KSU	Opp
Scoring	433	144
Points per game	39.5	18.5
First downs	276	197
Rushing	146	78
Passing	106	95
Penalty	24	24
Total offense	5,330	3,517
Avg per play	5.7	4.0
Avg per game	410.0	270.5
Fumbles-Lost	26-10	16-9
Penalties-Yards	108-931	99-720
Avg per game	71.6	55.4

	KSU	Opp
Punts-Yards	61-2,202	94-3,402
Avg per punt	36.1	36.2
Time of possession/Game	30:18	29:42
3rd down conversions	62/175	59/201
4th down conversions	11/21	11/23
Touchdowns scored	66	29
Field goals-Attempts	17-20	12-13
PAT-Attempts	59-62	26-27
Attendance	351,820	230,332
Games/Avg per Game	7/50,260	4/57,583

=== Offense ===
==== Rushing ====
Name	GP	Att	Gain	Loss	Net	Avg	TD	Long	Avg/G
Josh Scobey	13	169	775	57	718	4.2	16	34	55.2
Rock Cartwright	12	46	279	1	278	6.0	5	24	23.2
David Allen	9	62	259	29	230	3.7	1	28	25.6
Total	13	595	2,872	297	2,575	4.3	42	55	198.1
Opponents	13	473	1,768	492	1,276	2.7	20	66	98.2

==== Passing ====
Name	GP-GS	Effic	Att-Cmp-Int	Yds	TD	Lng	Avg/G	Pct.
Jonathan Beasley	13	132.12	313-156-10	2,636	17	74	202.8	49.8
Ell Roberson	6	98.24	23-10-2	119	2	23	19.8	43.5
Total	13	128.44	338-166-13	2,755	19	74	211.9	49.1
Opponents	13	94.90	399-204-20	2,241	8	74	172.4	51.1

==== Receiving ====
Name	GP	No.	Yds	Avg	TD	Long	Avg/G
Quincy Morgan	13	64	1,166	18.2	14	69	89.7
Aaron Lockett	13	36	584	16.2	2	50	44.9
Total	13	166	2,755	16.6	19	74	211.9
Opponents	13	204	2,241	11.	8	74	172.4
