= 2000 Kansas Jayhawks football team =

American college football season

2000 Kansas Jayhawks football
- Conference: Big 12 Conference
- North Division
- Record: 4–7 (2–6 Big 12)
- Head coach: Terry Allen (4th season)
- Offensive coordinator: Bill Salmon (4th season)
- Defensive coordinator: Ardell Wiegandt (4th season)
- Home stadium: Memorial Stadium

2000 Big 12 Conference football standings
	Conf.			Overall
Team	W		L	W		L
North Division
No. 9 Kansas State xy	6	–	2	11	–	3
No. 8 Nebraska x	6	–	2	10	–	2
No. 25 Iowa State	5	–	3	9	–	3
Colorado	3	–	5	3	–	8
Kansas	2	–	6	4	–	7
Missouri	2	–	6	3	–	8
South Division
No. 1 Oklahoma x$#	8	–	0	13	–	0
No. 12 Texas	7	–	1	9	–	3
Texas A&M	5	–	3	7	–	5
Texas Tech	3	–	5	7	–	6
Oklahoma State	1	–	7	3	–	8
Baylor	0	–	8	2	–	9
Championship: Oklahoma 27, Kansas State 24
# – BCS National Champion; $ – BCS representative as conference champion; x – Division champion/co-champions; y – Championship game participant; Rankings from AP Poll

The 2000 Kansas Jayhawks football team represented the University of Kansas as a member of the North Division of the Big 12 Conference during the 2000 NCAA Division I-A football season. Led by fourth-year head coach Terry Allen, the Jayhawks compiled an overall record of 4–7 with a mark of 2–6 in conference play, tying for fifth place at the bottom of the Big 12's North Division standings. The team played home games at Memorial Stadium in Lawrence, Kansas.

== Schedule ==
Date	Time	Opponent	Site	TV	Result	Attendance	Source
September 2	6:00 p.m.	at SMU*	Gerald J. Ford Stadium; University Park, TX		L 17–31	32,267	
September 16	6:00 p.m.	UAB*	Memorial Stadium; Lawrence, KS		W 23–20	28,500	
September 23	6:00 p.m.	Southern Illinois*	Memorial Stadium; Lawrence, KS		W 42–0	30,500	
September 30	2:00 p.m.	at No. 14 Oklahoma	Oklahoma Memorial Stadium; Norman, OK		L 16–34	74,811	
October 7	1:00 p.m.	No. 4 Kansas State	Memorial Stadium; Lawrence, KS (Sunflower Showdown)		L 13–52	48,500	
October 14	1:00 p.m.	at Missouri	Faurot Field; Columbia, MO (Border War)		W 38–17	61,794	
October 21	11:30 a.m.	Colorado^{†}	Memorial Stadium; Lawrence, KS	FSN	W 23–15	32,600	
October 28	1:00 p.m.	Texas Tech	Memorial Stadium; Lawrence, KS		L 39–45	26,000	
November 4	2:30 p.m.	at No. 6 Nebraska	Memorial Stadium; Lincoln, NE (rivalry)	ABC	L 17–56	78,096	
November 11	1:00 p.m.	No. 19 Texas	Memorial Stadium; Lawrence, KS		L 16–51	27,200	
November 18	1:00 p.m.	at Iowa State	Jack Trice Stadium; Ames, IA		L 17–38	36,725	
*Non-conference game; ^{†}Homecoming; Rankings from AP Poll released prior to the game; All times are in Central time

== Roster ==
2000 Kansas Jayhawks football team roster
Players
Coaches
Offense

Pos.	#	Name	Class
RB	33	Moran Norris	Sr
OT	75	Justin Hartwig	Jr

Defense

Pos.	#	Name	Class

Special teams

Pos.	#	Name	Class

Head coach

- Terry Allen

Coordinators/assistant coaches

- Tim Burke (defensive backs)
- Bill Salmon (Offensive coordinator)
- Ardell Wiegandt (Defensive coordinator)
- Jay Johnson (Quarterbacks coach)

Legend

- (C) Team captain
- (S) Suspended
- (I) Ineligible
- Injured
- Redshirt
