= 2000 Texas Tech Red Raiders football team =

American college football season

2000 Texas Tech Red Raiders football

Galleryfurniture.com Bowl, L 27–40 vs. East Carolina
- Conference: Big 12 Conference
- South Division
- Record: 7–6 (3–5 Big 12)
- Head coach: Mike Leach (1st season)
- Offensive scheme: Air raid
- Defensive coordinator: Greg McMackin (1st season)
- Base defense: 4–3
- Home stadium: Jones SBC Stadium

2000 Big 12 Conference football standings
	Conf.			Overall
Team	W		L	W		L
North Division
No. 9 Kansas State xy	6	–	2	11	–	3
No. 8 Nebraska x	6	–	2	10	–	2
No. 25 Iowa State	5	–	3	9	–	3
Colorado	3	–	5	3	–	8
Kansas	2	–	6	4	–	7
Missouri	2	–	6	3	–	8
South Division
No. 1 Oklahoma x$#	8	–	0	13	–	0
No. 12 Texas	7	–	1	9	–	3
Texas A&M	5	–	3	7	–	5
Texas Tech	3	–	5	7	–	6
Oklahoma State	1	–	7	3	–	8
Baylor	0	–	8	2	–	9
Championship: Oklahoma 27, Kansas State 24
# – BCS National Champion; $ – BCS representative as conference champion; x – Division champion/co-champions; y – Championship game participant; Rankings from AP Poll

The 2000 Texas Tech Red Raiders football team represented Texas Tech University as a member of the Big 12 Conference during the 2000 NCAA Division I-A football season. In their first season under head coach Mike Leach, the Red Raiders compiled a 7–6 record (3–5 against Big 12 opponents), finished in fourth place in Southern Division of the Big 12, and outscored opponents by a combined total of 330 to 278. The team played its home games at Jones SBC Stadium in Lubbock, Texas.

Of the team's staff and players, 23 went on to coach either in the NFL or in college football, including eight head coaches of FBS football teams and eight more who were FBS coordinators. Defensive coordinator Greg McMackin, running backs coach Art Briles, wide receivers coach Sonny Dykes, inside receivers coach Dana Holgorsen, linebackers coach Ruffin McNeill, special teams coordinator Manny Matsakis, and starting quarterback Kliff Kingsbury all went on to become FBS head coaches, with Kingsbury eventually becoming an NFL head coach.

== Schedule ==
Date	Time	Opponent	Site	TV	Result	Attendance	Source
August 26	7:00 p.m.	New Mexico*	Jones SBC Stadium; Lubbock, TX (Hispanic College Fund Football Classic)	FSN	W 24–3	42,238	
September 2	6:00 p.m.	Utah State*	Jones SBC Stadium; Lubbock, TX		W 38–16	35,913	
September 9	6:00 p.m.	North Texas*	Jones SBC Stadium; Lubbock, TX		W 13–7	36,925	
September 16	6:00 p.m.	Louisiana–Lafayette*	Jones SBC Stadium; Lubbock, TX		W 26–0	35,740	
September 30	11:30 a.m.	at Texas A&M	Kyle Field; College Station, TX (rivalry)	FSN	L 15–33	83,644	
October 7	6:00 p.m.	Baylor^{†}	Jones SBC Stadium; Lubbock, TX (rivalry)		W 28–0	40,209	
October 14	6:00 p.m.	No. 1 Nebraska	Jones SBC Stadium; Lubbock, TX	FSN	L 3–56	48,961	
October 21	6:00 p.m.	at No. 10 Kansas State	KSU Stadium; Manhattan, KS	FSN	L 23–28	51,140	
October 28	1:00 p.m.	at Kansas	Memorial Stadium; Lawrence, KS		W 45–39	26,000	
November 4	6:00 p.m.	No. 20 Texas	Jones SBC Stadium; Lubbock, TX (rivalry)	FSN	L 17–29	53,027	
November 11	1:00 p.m.	Oklahoma State	Jones SBC Stadium; Lubbock, TX		W 58–0	40,710	
November 18	2:30 p.m.	at No. 1 Oklahoma	Oklahoma Memorial Stadium; Norman, OK	ABC	L 13–27	75,364	
December 27	7:00 p.m.	vs. East Carolina*	Reliant Astrodome; Houston, TX (Galleryfurniture.com Bowl)	ESPN	L 27–40	33,899	
*Non-conference game; ^{†}Homecoming; Rankings from AP Poll released prior to the game; All times are in Central time

== Game summaries ==
=== New Mexico (Hispanic College Fund Football Classic) ===
Team	1	2	3	4	Total
Lobos	0	3	0	0	3
• Red Raiders	7	0	10	7	24

- Date: August 26
- Location: Jones SBC Stadium, Lubbock, Texas
- Game attendance: 42,238
- TV announcers (FSN): Bill Land (Play-by-play) & Gary Reasons (Color)

Scoring summary
1	6:44	Texas Tech	Ricky Williams 6 yard pass from Kliff Kingsbury (Chris Birkholz kick)	Texas Tech 7-0
2	0:00	New Mexico	Vladimir Borombozin 49 yard field goal	Texas Tech 7-3
3	10:51	Texas Tech	Derrek Dorris 8 yard pass from Kliff Kingsbury (Chris Birkholz kick)	Texas Tech 14-3
3	0:33	Texas Tech	Chris Birkholz 33 yard field goal	Texas Tech 17-3
4	8:22	Texas Tech	Aaron Hunt 63 yard fumble return (Chris Birkholz kick)	Texas Tech 24-3

Statistics	UNM	TTU
First downs	13	13
Total yards	167	255
Rushing yards	115	69
Passing yards	52	186
Turnovers	3	1
Time of possession	33:02	26:58

Team	Category	Player	Statistics
New Mexico	Passing	Jeremy Denson	6/18, 52 yards, INT
New Mexico	Rushing	Holmon Wiggins	24 rushes, 91 yards
New Mexico	Receiving	Larry Davis	2 receptions, 20 yards
Texas Tech	Passing	Kliff Kingsbury	21/47, 186 yards, 2 TD, INT
Texas Tech	Rushing	Ricky Williams	15 rushes, 78 yards
Texas Tech	Receiving	Derek Dorris	4 receptions, 53 yards, TD

=== Utah State ===
	1	2	3	4	Total
Aggies	0	3	6	7	16
Red Raiders	14	7	7	10	38

Statistics	USU	TTU
First downs	18	25
Total yards	300	582
Rushing yards	147	77
Passing yards	153	505
Turnovers	3	1
Time of possession	25:19	34:41

Team	Category	Player	Statistics
Utah State	Passing	Jeff Crosbie	16/34, 153 yards, 2 TD, INT
Utah State	Rushing	Emmett White	20 rushes, 143 yards
Utah State	Receiving	Aaron Jones	8 receptions, 90 yards, TD
Texas Tech	Passing	Kliff Kingsbury	33/47, 450 yards, 3 TD, INT
Texas Tech	Rushing	Ricky Williams	17 rushes, 59 yards
Texas Tech	Receiving	Carlos Francis	7 receptions, 234 yards, TD

=== North Texas ===
	1	2	3	4	Total
Mean Green	0	0	0	7	7
Red Raiders	0	7	6	0	13

Statistics	UNT	TTU
First downs	7	19
Total yards	156	318
Rushing yards	49	80
Passing yards	107	238
Turnovers	2	3
Time of possession	26:04	33:56

Team	Category	Player	Statistics
North Texas	Passing	Scott Hall	5/9, 93 yards
North Texas	Rushing	Ja'Quay Wilburn	11 rushes, 30 yards
North Texas	Receiving	Ladarrin McLane	1 reception, 60 yards
Texas Tech	Passing	Kliff Kingsbury	42/55, 238 yards, TD, 3 INT
Texas Tech	Rushing	Ricky Williams	13 rushes, 38 yards
Texas Tech	Receiving	Tim Baker	8 receptions, 67 yards, TD

=== Louisiana–Lafayette ===
	1	2	3	4	Total
Ragin' Cajuns	0	0	0	0	0
Red Raiders	7	6	7	6	26

Statistics	ULL	TTU
First downs	11	15
Total yards	179	341
Rushing yards	94	101
Passing yards	85	240
Turnovers	3	2
Time of possession	30:38	29:22

Team	Category	Player	Statistics
Louisiana–Lafayette	Passing	Jon Van Cleave	10/21, 79 yards, 3 INT
Louisiana–Lafayette	Rushing	John Bernard	15 rushes, 50 yards
Louisiana–Lafayette	Receiving	Frederick Stamps	3 receptions, 25 yards
Texas Tech	Passing	Kliff Kingsbury	24/37, 240 yards, TD, 2 INT
Texas Tech	Rushing	Ricky Williams	15 rushes, 55 yards, TD
Texas Tech	Receiving	Tim Baker	6 receptions, 140 yards, TD

=== At Texas A&M ===
	1	2	3	4	Total
Red Raiders	0	7	0	8	15
Aggies	10	6	3	14	33

Statistics	TTU	TAMU
First downs	19	18
Total yards	345	345
Rushing yards	23	159
Passing yards	322	186
Turnovers	3	1
Time of possession	33:32	26:28

Team	Category	Player	Statistics
Texas Tech	Passing	Kliff Kingsbury	28/50, 291 yards, 2 TD, 2 INT
Texas Tech	Rushing	Ricky Williams	12 rushes, 27 yards
Texas Tech	Receiving	Tim Baker	9 receptions, 90 yards, 2 TD
Texas A&M	Passing	Mark Farris	16/21, 186 yards
Texas A&M	Rushing	Richard Whitaker	12 rushes, 73 yards, TD
Texas A&M	Receiving	Robert Ferguson	8 receptions, 95 yards

=== Baylor ===
	1	2	3	4	Total
Bears	0	0	0	0	0
Red Raiders	7	7	7	7	28

Statistics	BAY	TTU
First downs	16	24
Total yards	248	451
Rushing yards	100	129
Passing yards	148	322
Turnovers	3	1
Time of possession	27:11	32:49

Team	Category	Player	Statistics
Baylor	Passing	Michael Odum	9/25, 110 yards, 2 INT
Baylor	Rushing	Darrell Bush	12 rushes, 50 yards
Baylor	Receiving	Lanny O'Steen	3 receptions, 69 yards
Texas Tech	Passing	Kliff Kingsbury	33/50, 322 yards, 2 TD
Texas Tech	Rushing	Shaud Williams	10 rushes, 67 yards
Texas Tech	Receiving	Darrell Jones	3 receptions, 79 yards

=== No. 1 Nebraska ===
	1	2	3	4	Total
No. 1 Cornhuskers	14	14	7	21	56
Red Raiders	0	0	3	0	3

Statistics	NEB	TTU
First downs	30	11
Total yards	540	200
Rushing yards	442	19
Passing yards	98	181
Turnovers	2	2
Time of possession	37:48	22:12

Team	Category	Player	Statistics
Nebraska	Passing	Eric Crouch	6/12, 86 yards, TD, INT
Nebraska	Rushing	Dan Alexander	20 rushes, 113 yards
Nebraska	Receiving	Matt Davison	2 receptions, 37 yards
Texas Tech	Passing	Kliff Kingsbury	20/37, 165 yards, 2 INT
Texas Tech	Rushing	B. J. Symons	1 rush, 15 yards
Texas Tech	Receiving	Wes Welker	3 receptions, 56 yards

=== At No. 10 Kansas State ===
	1	2	3	4	Total
Red Raiders	0	9	7	7	23
No. 10 Wildcats	0	14	7	7	28

Statistics	TTU	KSU
First downs	22	18
Total yards	337	285
Rushing yards	35	125
Passing yards	302	160
Turnovers	2	2
Time of possession	29:17	30:43

Team	Category	Player	Statistics
Texas Tech	Passing	Kliff Kingsbury	29/60, 302 yards, TD, 2 INT
Texas Tech	Rushing	Ricky Williams	8 rushes, 26 yards, TD
Texas Tech	Receiving	Derek Dorris	9 receptions, 124 yards, TD
Kansas State	Passing	Jonathan Beasley	13/25, 160 yards, TD, 2 INT
Kansas State	Rushing	Rock Cartwright	7 rushes, 41 yards, TD
Kansas State	Receiving	Aaron Lockett	5 receptions, 58 yards

=== At Kansas ===
	1	2	3	4	Total
Red Raiders	7	21	7	10	45
Jayhawks	7	7	11	14	39

Statistics	TTU	KU
First downs	28	27
Total yards	489	499
Rushing yards	80	172
Passing yards	409	327
Turnovers	1	1
Time of possession	29:02	30:58

Team	Category	Player	Statistics
Texas Tech	Passing	Kliff Kingsbury	32/48, 405 yards, 4 TD
Texas Tech	Rushing	Wes Welker	1 rush, 42 yards, TD
Texas Tech	Receiving	Darrell Jones	6 receptions, 109 yards
Kansas	Passing	Dylen Smith	23/40, 327 yards, 2 TD
Kansas	Rushing	David Winbush	20 rushes, 120 yards
Kansas	Receiving	Termaine Fulton	6 receptions, 126 yards, TD

=== No. 20 Texas ===
	1	2	3	4	Total
No. 20 Longhorns	10	6	10	3	29
Red Raiders	0	10	7	0	17

Statistics	TEX	TTU
First downs	26	20
Total yards	415	299
Rushing yards	233	17
Passing yards	182	282
Turnovers	2	5
Time of possession	38:56	21:04

Team	Category	Player	Statistics
Texas	Passing	Major Applewhite	18/33, 164 yards, INT
Texas	Rushing	Hodges Mitchell	45 rushes, 229 yards, 2 TD
Texas	Receiving	B. J. Johnson	5 receptions, 50 yards
Texas Tech	Passing	Kliff Kingsbury	28/49, 282 yards, TD, 2 INT
Texas Tech	Rushing	Ricky Williams	5 rushes, 32 yards, TD
Texas Tech	Receiving	Carlos Francis	7 receptions, 97 yards, TD

=== Oklahoma State ===
	1	2	3	4	Total
Cowboys	0	0	0	0	0
Red Raiders	7	21	27	3	58

Statistics	OKST	TTU
First downs	21	29
Total yards	330	404
Rushing yards	107	152
Passing yards	223	252
Turnovers	3	0
Time of possession	34:07	25:53

Team	Category	Player	Statistics
Oklahoma State	Passing	Aso Pogi	21/37, 219 yards, 2 INT
Oklahoma State	Rushing	Reggie White	23 rushes, 111 yards
Oklahoma State	Receiving	Terrance Davis-Bryant	4 receptions, 45 yards
Texas Tech	Passing	Kliff Kingsbury	30/43, 236 yards, 3 TD
Texas Tech	Rushing	Kliff Kingsbury	3 rushes, 34 yards, TD
Texas Tech	Receiving	Tim Baker	7 receptions, 75 yards, 2 TD

=== At No. 1 Oklahoma ===
	1	2	3	4	Total
Red Raiders	0	3	0	10	13
No. 1 Sooners	7	7	7	6	27

Statistics	TTU	OU
First downs	22	20
Total yards	330	384
Rushing yards	21	136
Passing yards	309	248
Turnovers	2	4
Time of possession	33:35	26:25

Team	Category	Player	Statistics
Texas Tech	Passing	Kliff Kingsbury	41/61, 295 yards, TD, 2 INT
Texas Tech	Rushing	Kliff Kingsbury	11 rushes, 24 yards
Texas Tech	Receiving	Derek Dorris	7 receptions, 71 yards
Oklahoma	Passing	Josh Heupel	24/38, 248 yards, TD, 2 INT
Oklahoma	Rushing	Quentin Griffin	14 rushes, 51 yards, TD
Oklahoma	Receiving	Curtis Fagan	4 receptions, 78 yards

=== Vs. East Carolina (Galleryfurniture.com Bowl) ===
	1	2	3	4	Total
Pirates	20	14	6	0	40
Red Raiders	0	7	7	13	27

Statistics	ECU	TTU
First downs	25	18
Total yards	481	369
Rushing yards	252	62
Passing yards	229	307
Turnovers	5	2
Time of possession	33:08	26:52

Team	Category	Player	Statistics
East Carolina	Passing	David Garrard	17/27, 229 yards, TD, 2 INT
East Carolina	Rushing	Leonard Henry	20 rushes, 92 yards, 2 TD
East Carolina	Receiving	Marcellus Harris	3 receptions, 76 yards
Texas Tech	Passing	Kliff Kingsbury	31/49, 307 yards, 4 TD, 2 INT
Texas Tech	Rushing	Ricky Williams	9 rushes, 55 yards
Texas Tech	Receiving	Darrell Jones	6 receptions, 147 yards, TD

== Roster ==
2000 Texas Tech Red Raiders football team roster
Players
Coaches
Offense

Pos.	#	Name	Class
RB	81	Tim Baker	Sr
WR	22	Derek Dorris	Sr
RB	32	James Easterling	Sr
WR	82	Carlos Francis	Fr
RB	12	Rickey Hunter	Sr
QB	16	Kliff Kingsbury	So
RB		Foy Munlin	Fr
QB	86	Mickey Peters	Fr
QB		B. J. Symons	So
WR	27	Wes Welker	Fr
RB	19	Shaud Williams	So

Defense

Pos.	#	Name	Class
DB	28	Ryan Aycock	Fr

Special teams

Pos.	#	Name	Class
P	18	Clinton Greathouse	So

Head coach

- Mike Leach

Coordinators/assistant coaches

- Greg McMackin (DC)
- Art Briles (RB)
- Sonny Dykes (WR)
- Dana Holgorsen (IWR)
- Robert Anae (OL)
- Ruffin McNeill (LB)
- Manny Matsakis (ST)
- Ron Harris (DA)
- Dave Aranda (GA)

Legend

- (C) Team captain
- (S) Suspended
- (I) Ineligible
- Injured
- Redshirt

== Team players drafted into the NFL ==
Player	Position	Round	Pick	NFL club
Kris Kocurek	Tackle	6	181	Seattle Seahawks
