= 2000 Texas Longhorns football team =

American college football season

2000 Texas Longhorns football

Holiday Bowl, L 30–35 vs. Oregon
- Conference: Big 12 Conference
- South Division

Ranking
- Coaches: No. 12
- AP: No. 12
- Record: 9–3 (7–1 Big 12)
- Head coach: Mack Brown (3rd season)
- Offensive coordinator: Greg Davis (3rd season)
- Offensive scheme: Pro-style
- Defensive coordinator: Carl Reese (3rd season)
- Base defense: 4–3
- Captains: Casey Hampton; Hodges Mitchell
- Home stadium: Darrell K Royal–Texas Memorial Stadium

2000 Big 12 Conference football standings
	Conf.			Overall
Team	W		L	W		L
North Division
No. 9 Kansas State xy	6	–	2	11	–	3
No. 8 Nebraska x	6	–	2	10	–	2
No. 25 Iowa State	5	–	3	9	–	3
Colorado	3	–	5	3	–	8
Kansas	2	–	6	4	–	7
Missouri	2	–	6	3	–	8
South Division
No. 1 Oklahoma x$#	8	–	0	13	–	0
No. 12 Texas	7	–	1	9	–	3
Texas A&M	5	–	3	7	–	5
Texas Tech	3	–	5	7	–	6
Oklahoma State	1	–	7	3	–	8
Baylor	0	–	8	2	–	9
Championship: Oklahoma 27, Kansas State 24
# – BCS National Champion; $ – BCS representative as conference champion; x – Division champion/co-champions; y – Championship game participant; Rankings from AP Poll

The 2000 Texas Longhorns football team represented the University of Texas at Austin as a member South Division of the Big 12 Conference during the 2000 NCAA Division I-A football season. Led by third-year head coach Mack Brown, the Longhorns compiled an overall record of 9–3 with a mark of 7–1 in conference play, placing second in the Big 12's South Division. Texas was invited to the Holiday Bowl, where the Longhorns lost to Oregon. The team played home games at Darrell K Royal–Texas Memorial Stadium in Austin, Texas.

Texas's only conference loss came at the hands of the Oklahoma Sooners, who went on to win the national championship

== Schedule ==
Date	Time	Opponent	Rank	Site	TV	Result	Attendance
September 9	11:30 a.m.	Louisiana–Lafayette*	No. 6	Darrell K Royal–Texas Memorial Stadium; Austin, TX	FSSW	W 52–10	80,017
September 16	9:15 p.m.	at Stanford*	No. 5	Stanford Stadium; Stanford, CA	FSN	L 24–27	43,970
September 23	6:00 p.m.	Houston*	No. 15	Darrell K Royal–Texas Memorial Stadium; Austin, TX	FSN	W 48–0	81,592
September 30	11:00 a.m.	Oklahoma State	No. 13	Darrell K Royal–Texas Memorial Stadium; Austin, TX	ABC	W 42–7	81,692
October 7	11:00 a.m.	vs. No. 10 Oklahoma	No. 11	Cotton Bowl; Dallas, TX (Red River Shootout)	ABC	L 14–63	75,587
October 14	2:30 p.m.	at Colorado	No. 25	Folsom Field; Boulder, CO		W 28–14	52,030
October 21	1:30 p.m.	Missouri		Darrell K Royal–Texas Memorial Stadium; Austin, TX		W 46–12	82,892
October 28	11:30 a.m.	Baylor	No. 22	Darrell K Royal–Texas Memorial Stadium; Austin, TX (rivalry)	FSN	W 48–14	83,092
November 4	6:00 p.m.	at Texas Tech	No. 20	Jones Stadium; Lubbock, TX (rivalry)	FSN	W 29–17	53,027
November 11	1:00 p.m.	at Kansas	No. 19	Memorial Stadium; Lawrence, KS		W 51–16	27,200
November 24	2:30 p.m.	No. 22 Texas A&M	No. 12	Darrell K Royal–Texas Memorial Stadium; Austin, TX (rivalry)	ABC	W 43–17	84,012
December 29	7:30 p.m.	vs. No. 8 Oregon*	No. 12	Qualcomm Stadium; San Diego, CA (Holiday Bowl)	ESPN	L 30–35	63,278
*Non-conference game; Rankings from AP Poll released prior to the game; All times are in Central time

== Rankings ==
Ranking movements Legend: ██ Increase in ranking ██ Decrease in ranking — = Not ranked ( ) = First-place votes
	Week																
Poll	Pre	1	2	3	4	5	6	7	8	9	10	11	12	13	14	15	Final
AP	7 (1)	7 (2)	6 (2)	5 (2)	15	13	11	25	—	22	20	19	14	12	12	12	12
Coaches Poll	8	8	8	6	15	13	10	23	21	20	20	19	15	13	12	12	12
BCS	Not released									—	—	—	14	12	12	12	Not released

== Roster ==
2000 Texas Longhorns football team roster
Players
Coaches
Offense

Pos.	#	Name	Class
QB	2	Chris Simms	So
WR	4	Roy Williams	Fr

Defense

Pos.	#	Name	Class
DE	40	Cory Redding	So

Special teams

Pos.	#	Name	Class

Head coach

- Mack Brown

Coordinators/assistant coaches

Legend

- (C) Team captain
- (S) Suspended
- (I) Ineligible
- Injured
- Redshirt
