= 2000 Texas A&M Aggies football team =

American college football season

2000 Texas A&M Aggies football

Independence Bowl, L 41–43 ^{OT} vs. Mississippi State
- Conference: Big 12 Conference
- South Division
- Record: 7–5 (5–3 Big 12)
- Head coach: R. C. Slocum (12th season)
- Offensive coordinator: Steve Kragthorpe (3rd season)
- Offensive scheme: Pro-style
- Defensive coordinator: Mike Hankwitz (4th season)
- Base defense: 4–3
- Home stadium: Kyle Field

2000 Big 12 Conference football standings
	Conf.			Overall
Team	W		L	W		L
North Division
No. 9 Kansas State xy	6	–	2	11	–	3
No. 8 Nebraska x	6	–	2	10	–	2
No. 25 Iowa State	5	–	3	9	–	3
Colorado	3	–	5	3	–	8
Kansas	2	–	6	4	–	7
Missouri	2	–	6	3	–	8
South Division
No. 1 Oklahoma x$#	8	–	0	13	–	0
No. 12 Texas	7	–	1	9	–	3
Texas A&M	5	–	3	7	–	5
Texas Tech	3	–	5	7	–	6
Oklahoma State	1	–	7	3	–	8
Baylor	0	–	8	2	–	9
Championship: Oklahoma 27, Kansas State 24
# – BCS National Champion; $ – BCS representative as conference champion; x – Division champion/co-champions; y – Championship game participant; Rankings from AP Poll

The 2000 Texas A&M Aggies football team represented Texas A&M University as a member of the South Division of the Big 12 Conference during the 2000 NCAA Division I-A football season. Led by 12th-year head coach R. C. Slocum, the Aggies compiled an overall record of 7–5 with a mark of 5–3 in conference play, placing third in Big 12's South Division. Texas A&M was invited to the Independence Bowl, where the Aggies lost to Mississippi State. The team played home games at Kyle Field in College Station, Texas.

== Schedule ==
Date	Time	Opponent	Rank	Site	TV	Result	Attendance	Source
September 2	11:00 am	at Notre Dame*	No. 25	Notre Dame Stadium; Notre Dame, IN	NBC	L 10–24	80,232	
September 9	6:00 pm	Wyoming*		Kyle Field; College Station, TX	FSN	W 51–3	69,273	
September 16	7:00 pm	UTEP*		Kyle Field; College Station, TX		W 45–17	69,184	
September 30	11:30 am	Texas Tech		Kyle Field; College Station, TX (rivalry)	FSN	W 33–15	83,644	
October 7	1:00 pm	Colorado		Kyle Field; College Station, TX		L 19–26	75,523	
October 14	11:30 am	at Baylor		Floyd Casey Stadium; Waco, TX (Battle of the Brazos)	FSN	W 24–0	40,076	
October 21	2:30 pm	at Iowa State		Jack Trice Stadium; Ames, IA	ABC	W 30-7	48,931	
October 28	2:30 pm	No. 10 Kansas State		Kyle Field; College Station, TX	ABC	W 26–10	80,659	
November 4	1:00 pm	at Oklahoma State	No. 24	Lewis Field; Stillwater, OK		W 21–16	36,310	
November 11	12:00 pm	No. 1 Oklahoma	No. 23	Kyle Field; College Station, TX (College GameDay)	ABC	L 31–35	87,188	
November 24	2:30 pm	at No. 12 Texas	No. 21	Darrell K Royal–Texas Memorial Stadium; Austin, TX (rivalry)	ABC	L 17–43	84,012	
December 31	7:00 pm	vs. Mississippi State*		Independence Stadium; Shreveport, LA (Independence Bowl)	ESPN	L 41–43 ^{OT}	36,974	
*Non-conference game; Rankings from AP Poll released prior to the game; All times are in Central time

== Rankings ==
Ranking movements Legend: ██ Increase in ranking ██ Decrease in ranking — = Not ranked
	Week																
Poll	Pre	1	2	3	4	5	6	7	8	9	10	11	12	13	14	15	Final
AP	—	25	—	—	—	—	—	—	—	—	24	23	22	—	—	—	—
Coaches Poll	24	23	—	—	—	—	—	—	—	—	25	24	23	22	—	—	—
BCS	Not released									—	—	—	15	—	—	—	Not released

== Game summaries ==
=== Notre Dame ===
	1	2	3	4	Total
#25 Texas A&M	0	7	3	0	10
Notre Dame	0	7	7	10	24

=== Wyoming ===
	1	2	3	4	Total
Wyoming	3	0	0	0	3
Texas A&M	7	14	14	16	51

=== UTEP ===
	1	2	3	4	Total
UTEP	7	10	0	0	17
Texas A&M	14	0	14	17	45

=== Texas Tech ===
	1	2	3	4	Total
Texas Tech	0	7	0	8	15
Texas A&M	10	6	3	14	33

=== Colorado ===
	1	2	3	4	Total
Colorado	9	3	7	7	26
Texas A&M	0	13	0	6	19

=== Baylor ===
	1	2	3	4	Total
Texas A&M	0	10	7	7	24
Baylor	0	0	0	0	0

=== Iowa State ===
	1	2	3	4	Total
Texas A&M	10	10	3	7	30
Iowa State	0	0	0	7	7

=== Kansas State ===
	1	2	3	4	Total
Kansas State	0	0	10	0	10
Texas A&M	12	7	0	7	26

=== Oklahoma State ===
	1	2	3	4	Total
Texas A&M	0	7	14	0	21
Oklahoma State	0	7	3	6	16

=== Oklahoma ===
	1	2	3	4	Total
Oklahoma	3	7	3	22	35
Texas A&M	7	10	7	7	31

=== Texas ===
	1	2	3	4	Total
Texas A&M	0	7	10	0	17
Texas	7	3	27	6	43

=== Mississippi State ===
	1	2	3	4	OT	Total
Mississippi State	0	14	7	14	8	43
Texas A&M	14	6	0	15	6	41

== Roster ==
2000 Texas A&M Aggies football team roster
Players
Coaches
Offense

Pos.	#	Name	Class
WR	4	Dwain Goynes	So
RB	5	Ja Mar Toombs	Jr
WR	6	Robert Ferguson	Jr
WR	7	Chris Taylor	Sr
QB	8	Vance Smith	So
WR	9	Bethel Johnson	Jr
QB	10	Mark Farris	So
QB	11	Colby Freeman	Fr
C	63	Chance Pearce	So
G	65	Andre Brooks	Fr
OT	66	Geoff Hangartner	Fr
OT	67	Wes Dennard	Fr
G	68	Britt Lively	Fr
C	69	Don Muhlbach	Fr
G	70	Moses Vakalahi	Jr
G	71	Chris Valletta	Sr
OT	72	Billy Yates	So
OT	73	Alan Reuber	Fr
OT	74	Tango McCauley	Jr
G	75	Chris Montgomery	So
G	76	Michael Mahan	So
OT	77	Seth McKinney	Jr
OT	78	Kasey Cheshier	Fr
WR	80	Ellison Collins	Fr
TE	81	Joey Perot	Fr
TE	82	RoDerrick Broughton	Sr
WR	83	Mickey Jones	Jr
TE	84	Tashumbrae' Brown	Fr
TE	85	Lonnie Madison	Jr
TE	86	Fred Spiller	Fr
TE	87	Michael de la Torre	So

Defense

Pos.	#	Name	Class
CB	1	Michael Jameson	Sr
LB	2	Christian Rodriguez	Jr
LB	3	Roylin Bradley	Sr
CB	14	Dawon Gentry	Fr
CB	15	Adam Black	Fr
DT	90	Stephen Young	Sr
DT	91	Marcus Jasmin	Fr
DT	93	Evan Perroni	Jr
DL	95	Rocky Bernard	Jr
DT	96	Ron Edwards	Sr
DE	99	Ronald Flemons	Sr

Special teams

Pos.	#	Name	Class
P	16	Derek Lechler	So

Head coach

- R. C. Slocum

Coordinators/assistant coaches

Legend

- (C) Team captain
- (S) Suspended
- (I) Ineligible
- Injured
- Redshirt

== Team players in the NFL ==
Player	Position	Round	Pick	NFL club
Robert Ferguson	Wide receiver	2	41	Green Bay Packers
Ron Edwards	Defensive tackle	3	76	Buffalo Bills
Michael Jameson	Cornerback	6	165	Cleveland Browns
Jason Glenn	Linebacker	6	173	Detroit Lions
Chris Taylor	Wide Receiver	7	218	Pittsburgh Steelers
Ronald Flemons	Defensive end	7	226	Atlanta Falcons
