= 2000 Oklahoma State Cowboys football team =

American college football season

2000 Oklahoma State Cowboys football
- Conference: Big 12 Conference
- South Division
- Record: 3–8 (1–7 Big 12)
- Head coach: Bob Simmons (6th season)
- Offensive coordinator: Del Miller (1st season)
- Defensive coordinator: Michael Cassity (1st season)
- Home stadium: Lewis Field

2000 Big 12 Conference football standings
	Conf.			Overall
Team	W		L	W		L
North Division
No. 9 Kansas State xy	6	–	2	11	–	3
No. 8 Nebraska x	6	–	2	10	–	2
No. 25 Iowa State	5	–	3	9	–	3
Colorado	3	–	5	3	–	8
Kansas	2	–	6	4	–	7
Missouri	2	–	6	3	–	8
South Division
No. 1 Oklahoma x$#	8	–	0	13	–	0
No. 12 Texas	7	–	1	9	–	3
Texas A&M	5	–	3	7	–	5
Texas Tech	3	–	5	7	–	6
Oklahoma State	1	–	7	3	–	8
Baylor	0	–	8	2	–	9
Championship: Oklahoma 27, Kansas State 24
# – BCS National Champion; $ – BCS representative as conference champion; x – Division champion/co-champions; y – Championship game participant; Rankings from AP Poll

The 2000 Oklahoma State Cowboys football team represented Oklahoma State University as a member of the Big 12 Conference during the 2000 NCAA Division I-A football season. Led by Bob Simmons in his sixth and final season as head coach, the Cowboys compiled an overall record of 3–8 with a mark of 1–7 in conference play, placing fifth in the Big 12's South Division. Oklahoma State played home games at Lewis Field in Stillwater, Oklahoma.

Simmons resigned head coach of the Cowboys on November 6, effective at the end of the season.

== Schedule ==
Date	Time	Opponent	Site	TV	Result	Attendance	Source
September 9	6:00 p.m.	at Tulsa*	Skelly Stadium; Tulsa, OK (rivalry)		W 36–26	40,385	
September 16	7:00 p.m.	Southwest Texas State*	Lewis Field; Stillwater, OK		W 23–0	40,050	
September 23	7:00 p.m.	No. 22 Southern Miss*	Lewis Field; Stillwater, OK		L 6–28	41,205	
September 30	11:00 a.m.	at No. 13 Texas	Darrell K Royal–Texas Memorial Stadium; Austin, TX	ABC	L 7–42	81,692	
October 7	1:00 p.m.	at Missouri	Faurot Field; Columbia, MO		L 10–24	51,449	
October 14	7:00 p.m.	Iowa State^{†}	Lewis Field; Stillwater, OK		L 26–33	41,310	
October 28	2:30 p.m.	at Colorado	Folsom Field; Boulder, CO		L 21–37	49,140	
November 4	1:00 p.m.	No. 24 Texas A&M	Lewis Field; Stillwater, OK		L 16–21	36,310	
November 11	1:00 p.m.	at Texas Tech	Jones SBC Stadium; Lubbock, TX		L 0–58	44,710	
November 18	1:00 p.m.	Baylor	Lewis Field; Stillwater, OK		W 50–22	31,500	
November 25	2:30 p.m.	No. 1 Oklahoma	Lewis Field; Stillwater, OK (Bedlam Series)	FSN	L 7–12	48,500	
*Non-conference game; ^{†}Homecoming; Rankings from AP Poll released prior to the game; All times are in Central time
