= 2000 Baylor Bears football team =

American college football season

2000 Baylor Bears football
- Conference: Big 12 Conference
- South Division
- Record: 2–9 (0–8 Big 12)
- Head coach: Kevin Steele (2nd season)
- Offensive coordinator: Greg Meyer (2nd season)
- Offensive scheme: Pro-style
- Defensive coordinator: Brick Haley (2nd season)
- Base defense: 4–3
- Home stadium: Floyd Casey Stadium

2000 Big 12 Conference football standings
	Conf.			Overall
Team	W		L	W		L
North Division
No. 9 Kansas State xy	6	–	2	11	–	3
No. 8 Nebraska x	6	–	2	10	–	2
No. 25 Iowa State	5	–	3	9	–	3
Colorado	3	–	5	3	–	8
Kansas	2	–	6	4	–	7
Missouri	2	–	6	3	–	8
South Division
No. 1 Oklahoma x$#	8	–	0	13	–	0
No. 12 Texas	7	–	1	9	–	3
Texas A&M	5	–	3	7	–	5
Texas Tech	3	–	5	7	–	6
Oklahoma State	1	–	7	3	–	8
Baylor	0	–	8	2	–	9
Championship: Oklahoma 27, Kansas State 24
# – BCS National Champion; $ – BCS representative as conference champion; x – Division champion/co-champions; y – Championship game participant; Rankings from AP Poll

The 2000 Baylor Bears football team represented Baylor University as a member of the South Division of the Big 12 Conference during the 2000 NCAA Division I-A football season. Led by second-year head coach Kevin Steele, the Bears compiled an overall record of 2–9 with a mark of 0–8 in conference play, placing last out of six teams in the Big 12's South Division. The team played home games at Floyd Casey Stadium in Waco, Texas.

== Schedule ==
Date	Time	Opponent	Site	TV	Result	Attendance
August 31	7:00 p.m.	at North Texas*	Fouts Field; Denton, TX	CSS	W 20–7	28,315
September 16	11:30 a.m.	Minnesota*	Floyd Casey Stadium; Waco, TX	FSN	L 9–34	20,125
September 23	6:00 p.m.	South Florida*	Floyd Casey Stadium; Waco, TX		W 28–13	21,157
September 30	6:00 p.m.	Iowa State	Floyd Casey Stadium; Waco, TX		L 17–31	31,126
October 7	6:00 p.m.	at Texas Tech	Jones SBC Stadium; Lubbock, TX (rivalry)		L 0–28	40,209
October 14	11:30 a.m.	Texas A&M	Floyd Casey Stadium; Waco, TX (Battle of the Brazos)	FSN	L 0–24	40,076
October 21	12:30 p.m.	at No. 1 Nebraska	Memorial Stadium; Lincoln, NE		L 0–59	77,959
October 28	11:30 a.m.	at No. 22 Texas	Darrell K Royal–Texas Memorial Stadium; Austin, TX (rivalry)	FSN	L 14–48	83,092
November 4	1:00 p.m.	No. 1 Oklahoma	Floyd Casey Stadium; Waco, TX		L 7–56	31,106
November 11	1:00 p.m.	Missouri^{†}	Floyd Casey Stadium; Waco, TX		L 22–47	29,872
November 18	1:00 p.m.	at Oklahoma State	Lewis Field; Stillwater, OK		L 22–55	31,500
*Non-conference game; ^{†}Homecoming; Rankings from AP Poll released prior to the game; All times are in Central time
