= 2000 Missouri Tigers football team =

American college football season

2000 Missouri Tigers football
- Conference: Big 12 Conference
- North Division
- Record: 3–8 (2–6 Big 12)
- Head coach: Larry Smith (7th season)
- Offensive coordinator: Bill Cubit (1st season)
- Offensive scheme: Spread
- Defensive coordinator: Moe Ankney (7th season)
- Base defense: 4–3
- Home stadium: Faurot Field

2000 Big 12 Conference football standings
	Conf.			Overall
Team	W		L	W		L
North Division
No. 9 Kansas State xy	6	–	2	11	–	3
No. 8 Nebraska x	6	–	2	10	–	2
No. 25 Iowa State	5	–	3	9	–	3
Colorado	3	–	5	3	–	8
Kansas	2	–	6	4	–	7
Missouri	2	–	6	3	–	8
South Division
No. 1 Oklahoma x$#	8	–	0	13	–	0
No. 12 Texas	7	–	1	9	–	3
Texas A&M	5	–	3	7	–	5
Texas Tech	3	–	5	7	–	6
Oklahoma State	1	–	7	3	–	8
Baylor	0	–	8	2	–	9
Championship: Oklahoma 27, Kansas State 24
# – BCS National Champion; $ – BCS representative as conference champion; x – Division champion/co-champions; y – Championship game participant; Rankings from AP Poll

The 2000 Missouri Tigers football team represented the University of Missouri during the 2000 NCAA Division I-A football season. Larry Smith was the coach in 2000. After the season, he was fired and replaced by new coach Gary Pinkel. They began the season promisingly with a 50–20 win over Western Illinois. The next week, however, they lost by 53 points at No. 17 Clemson which set the tone for the rest of the season. Although they were able to win twice in conference, they continually had very little success against ranked opponents.

== Schedule ==
Date	Time	Opponent	Site	TV	Result	Attendance	Source
September 2	6:30 pm	No. 23 (I-AA) Western Illinois*	Faurot Field; Columbia, MO		W 50–20	53,224	
September 9	2:30 pm	at No. 17 Clemson*	Memorial Stadium; Clemson, SC	ABC	L 9–62	70,382	
September 16	6:00 pm	Michigan State*	Faurot Field; Columbia, MO	FSN	L 10–13	55,289	
September 30	6:00 pm	at No. 1 Nebraska	Memorial Stadium; Lincoln, NE (rivalry)	FSN	L 24–42	77,744	
October 7	1:00 pm	Oklahoma State	Faurot Field; Columbia, MO		W 24–10	51,149	
October 14	1:00 pm	Kansas	Faurot Field; Columbia, MO (Border War)		L 17–38	61,794	
October 21	1:30 pm	at Texas	Darrell K Royal–Texas Memorial Stadium; Austin, TX		L 12–46	82,892	
October 28	6:00 pm	at Iowa State	Jack Trice Stadium; Ames, IA (rivalry)	FSN	L 20–39	46,599	
November 4	1:00 pm	Colorado	Faurot Field; Columbia, MO		L 18–28	50,567	
November 11	1:00 pm	at Baylor	Floyd Casey Stadium; Waco, TX		W 47–22	29,872	
November 18	11:30 am	No. 9 Kansas State	Faurot Field; Columbia, MO	FSN	L 24–28	49,277	
*Non-conference game; Rankings from AP Poll released prior to the game; All times are in Central time

== Personnel ==
=== Coaching staff ===
Name	Position	Seasons at Missouri	Alma mater
Larry Smith	Head coach	7	Bowling Green (1961)
Bill Cubit	Offensive coordinator & quarterbacks	1	Delaware (1974)
Corbyn Smith	Offensive tackle & tight end	3	Iowa (1995)
Andy Hill	Co-offensive coordinator & Wide receivers	5	Missouri (1985)
Sam Pittman	Offensive line	1	Pittsburg State (1984)
Moe Ankney	Defensive coordinator/Outside Linebackers	7	Bowling Green (1963)
Dave Toub	Defensive line	3	UTEP (1985)
Ricky Hunley	Inside Linebackers & associate head coach	7	Arizona (1984)
Brian Stewart	defensive backs	2	Northern Arizona (1988)
Chris Tabor	Running backs/Special teams coordinator	1	Benedictine (1993)

=== Roster ===
2000 Missouri Tigers football team roster
Players
Coaches
Offense

Pos.	#	Name	Class
QB	3	Darius Outlaw	Fr
QB	11	Jim Dougherty	Jr
WR	12	Justin Gage	So
C	70	A. J. Ricker	Fr

Defense

Pos.	#	Name	Class
CB	4	Julian Jones	Sr
ILB	5	David Monroe	Jr
ILB	6	Antwaun Bynum	Jr
CB	7	Antoine Duncan	So
FS	8	Clarence Jones	Jr
DE	96	Justin Smith	So

Special teams

Pos.	#	Name	Class

Head coach

- Larry Smith

Coordinators/assistant coaches

Legend

- (C) Team captain
- (S) Suspended
- (I) Ineligible
- Injured
- Redshirt

Roster

== Players drafted into the NFL ==
Round	Pick	Player	Position	NFL Club
1	4	Justin Smith	DE	Cincinnati Bengals
