= Marcus Houston =

American football player (born 1981)

Profile
- Position: Running back

Personal information
- Born: May 27, 1981 (age 45); Denver, Colorado
- Listed height: 6 ft 2 in (1.88 m)
- Listed weight: 219 lb (99 kg)

Career information
- High school: Thomas Jefferson (Denver, Colorado)
- College: Colorado (2000–2002); Colorado State (2003–2004)
- NFL draft: 2005: undrafted

Marcus Houston (born May 27, 1981) is an American former football player.

== Early life ==
Houston grew up in Denver, Colorado and attended Thomas Jefferson High School. As a senior, he rushed for 1723 yards and 28 touchdowns. Houston was one of the most sought after recruits in the nation and committed to play at the University of Colorado over offers from Texas, Florida State, Southern California, UCLA, Ohio State and Miami. He was widely considered to be the most highly-touted prospect in Colorado Buffaloes history at the time. He was also a USA Today High School All-American in 1999.

== College career ==
Houston was named the Buffaloes' starting running back going into his freshman season. He rushed for 332 yards and one touchdown on 66 carries over three games before suffering an injury that ended his season. As a sophomore, Houston was part of a running back rotation with Brian Calhoun and Chris Brown and saw curtailed playing time. He frequently clashed with his running backs coach Eric Bieniemy, who often criticized Houston for what he believed to be a lack of toughness and unwillingness to play hurt. He suffered a torn groin muscle and rushed for 132 yards and one touchdown in seven games. In his junior year (2002), Houston played in only four of Colorado's games due to a partially torn ligament in his knee and rushed for 49 yards.

Houston ultimately transferred to Colorado State and was granted immediate eligibility to play. In his first year with the team he rushed 158 times for 636 yards, which was second on the team behind quarterback Bradlee Van Pelt, and nine touchdowns. Houston gained 206 yards on 57 carries in his final collegiate season.
