= Tyson Smith (American football) =

American football player (born 1981)

No. 48
- Position: Defensive lineman

Personal information
- Born: October 9, 1981 (age 45); Des Moines, Iowa, U.S.
- Listed height: 6 ft 2 in (1.88 m)
- Listed weight: 250 lb (113 kg)

Career information
- College: Iowa State
- NFL draft: 2005: undrafted

Career history
- Baltimore Ravens (2005)*; New York Giants (2005–2006); Rhein Fire (2006); San Francisco 49ers (2007)*; Washington Redskins (2007)*; Dallas Cowboys (2007–2008)*; Miami Dolphins (2008)*; Denver Broncos (2008)*; Washington Redskins (2008); Tennessee Titans (2009)*; Iowa Barnstormers (2010)
- * Offseason or practice squad member only

Career NFL statistics
- Total tackles: 4
- Stats at Pro Football Reference

Tyson Catrell Smith (born October 9, 1981) is an American former professional football player who was a defensive lineman in the National Football League (NFL). He was signed by the Baltimore Ravens as an undrafted free agent in 2005. He played college football for the Iowa State Cyclones.

Smith was also a member of the New York Giants, San Francisco 49ers, Washington Redskins, Dallas Cowboys, Miami Dolphins, Denver Broncos, Tennessee Titans and Iowa Barnstormers.

Pre-draft measurables
Height	Weight	Three-cone drill	Broad jump	Bench press
6 ft 2 in (1.88 m)	240 lb (109 kg)	7.09 s	9 ft 10 in (3.00 m)	9 reps
All values from Pro Day
