= Brady McDonnell =

American football player (born 1977)

No. 48
- Position: Tight end

Personal information
- Born: July 24, 1977 (age 49); Rapid City, South Dakota, U.S.
- Listed height: 6 ft 4 in (1.93 m)
- Listed weight: 265 lb (120 kg)

Career information
- High school: Wall (SD)
- College: Colorado
- NFL draft: 2001: undrafted

Career history
- New York Giants (2001); Buffalo Bills (2002–2004)
- Stats at Pro Football Reference

Brady Joe McDonnell (born July 24, 1977) is an American auto racing driver and former football tight end who played for the New York Giants and Buffalo Bills of the National Football League (NFL). He played college football at University of Colorado Boulder.

McDonnell started all four years at Colorado and was a team captain in his senior year. After going unselected in the 2001 NFL draft, he was picked up by the Giants but missed the season due to a knee injury he suffered in training camp. He signed with the Bills in 2002 and was converted to tight end. Officially, he was with the Bills through 2004 but noted "only two of them were actually playing," having spent his final season on the injured reserve list.

After retiring from football, McDonnell returned to Rapid City, South Dakota, to work for a medical supply company. He later became a dirt track racing driver alongside his brothers Jay and Travis. Brady and Travis also compete in off-road racing like their father Steve; McDonnell has raced events like the Mint 400 with Steve's vintage 1987 Ford, which he and Jay restored. The McDonnells also operate a farm near Wall, South Dakota.
