= Hispanic College Fund Football Classic =

College football kickoff game

Hispanic College Fund Football Classic (defunct)
- Stadium: Jones AT&T Stadium; Oklahoma Memorial Stadium; Lane Stadium
- Location: Lubbock, Texas; Norman, Oklahoma; Blacksburg, Virginia
- Operated: 2000–2002

Sponsors
- Hispanic College Fund

The Hispanic College Fund Football Classic was a college football kickoff game played from 2000 to 2002 at various sites. In three years, the game was contested by teams in six states and was played in three locations.

== Game results ==
Season	Date	Winning team		Losing team		Location
2000	August 26	Texas Tech	24	New Mexico	3	Lubbock, Texas
2001	August 25	3 Oklahoma	41	North Carolina	27	Norman, Oklahoma
2002	August 25	16 Virginia Tech	63	Arkansas State	7	Blacksburg, Virginia

Rankings are from the AP Poll.

== Records ==
=== By team ===
Rank	Team	Apps	Record	Win %
1	Texas Tech	1	1–0	1.000
1	Oklahoma	1	1–0	1.000
1	Virginia Tech	1	1–0	1.000
4	New Mexico	1	0–1	0.000
4	North Carolina	1	0–1	0.000
4	Arkansas State	1	0–1	0.000

=== By conference ===
Rank	Conference	Apps	Record	Win %
1	Big 12	2	2–0	1.000
2	ACC	2	1–1	0.500
3	Mountain West	1	0–1	0.000
3	Sun Belt	1	0–1	0.000
