= 1999 Texas Tech Red Raiders football team =

American college football season

1999 Texas Tech Red Raiders football
- Conference: Big 12 Conference
- South Division
- Record: 6–5 (5–3 Big 12)
- Head coach: Spike Dykes (13th season)
- Offensive coordinator: Rick Dykes (4th season)
- Offensive scheme: Spread
- Defensive coordinator: John Goodner (5th season)
- Base defense: 4–2–5/4–4 hybrid
- Home stadium: Jones Stadium

1999 Big 12 Conference football standings
	Conf.			Overall
Team	W		L	W		L
North Division
No. 3 Nebraska xy$	7	–	1	12	–	1
No. 6 Kansas State x	7	–	1	11	–	1
Colorado	5	–	3	7	–	5
Kansas	3	–	5	5	–	7
Iowa State	1	–	7	4	–	7
Missouri	1	–	7	4	–	7
South Division
No. 21 Texas xy	6	–	2	9	–	5
Oklahoma	5	–	3	7	–	5
Texas Tech	5	–	3	6	–	5
No. 23 Texas A&M	5	–	3	8	–	4
Oklahoma State	3	–	5	5	–	6
Baylor	0	–	8	1	–	10
Championship: Nebraska 22, Texas 6
$ – BCS representative as conference champion; x – Division champion/co-champions; y – Championship game participant; Rankings from AP Poll

The 1999 Texas Tech Red Raiders football team represented Texas Tech University as a member of the Big 12 Conference during the 1999 NCAA Division I-A football season. Led by Spike Dykes in his 13th and final season as head coach, the Red Raiders compiled an overall record of 6–5 with a mark of 5–3, placing in a three-way tie for second in the Big 12's South Division. The team's offense scored 253 points, while the defense allowed 282 points on the season.

On November 20, following the team's 38–28 win over Oklahoma, Dykes announced his retirement. He was replaced by Oklahoma offensive coordinator Mike Leach.

== Schedule ==
Date	Time	Opponent	Site	TV	Result	Attendance
September 6	7:00 pm	at No. 25 Arizona State*	Sun Devil Stadium; Tempe, AZ	FSN	L 13–31	65,091
September 11	7:00 pm	at Louisiana–Lafayette*	Cajun Field; Lafayette, LA		W 38–17	18,182
September 18	6:00 pm	North Texas*	Jones Stadium; Lubbock, TX		L 14–21	45,824
October 2	6:00 pm	No. 5 Texas A&M	Jones Stadium; Lubbock, TX (rivalry)	FSN	W 21–19	53,513
October 9	7:00 pm	at Oklahoma State	Lewis Field; Stillwater, OK		L 21–41	44,125
October 16	2:30 pm	Colorado^{†}	Jones Stadium; Lubbock, TX	ABC	W 31–10	46,424
October 23	6:00 pm	at Baylor	Floyd Casey Stadium; Waco, TX (rivalry)		W 35–7	27,815
October 30	1:00 pm	at Missouri	Faurot Field; Columbia, MO		L 7–34	52,982
November 6	1:00 pm	Iowa State	Jones Stadium; Lubbock, TX		W 28–16	41,691
November 13	6:00 pm	at No. 10 Texas	Texas Memorial Stadium; Austin, TX (rivalry)	FSN	L 7–58	83,882
November 20	11:30 am	Oklahoma	Jones Stadium; Lubbock, TX	FSN	W 38–28	42,020
*Non-conference game; ^{†}Homecoming; Rankings from AP Poll released prior to the game; All times are in Central time

== Game summaries ==
=== At No. 25 Arizona State ===
Texas Tech Red Raiders at No. 25 Arizona State Sun Devils – Game summary

Quarter	1	2	3	4	Total
Red Raiders	7	0	0	6	13
No. 25 Sun Devils	0	13	18	0	31

at Sun Devil Stadium, Tempe, Arizona

- Date: September 6
- Game time: 7:00 p.m. CDT/5:00 p.m. MST
- Game weather: Temperature: 105 °F (41 °C) • Weather: Humid • Wind: 6 MPH
- Game attendance: 65,091
- Referee: Jay Stricherz
- TV announcers (FSN): Steve Physioc, Tom Ramsey, and James Lofton
- Stats

Game information

First quarter

- TTU – Ricky Williams 1-yard run (Chris Birkholz kick), 11:42. Red Raiders 7–0. Drive: 2 plays, 33 yards, 0:29.

Second quarter

- ASU – J. R. Redmond 56-yard run (Stephen Baker kick), 14:37. Tied 7–7. Drive: 1 play, 56 yards, 0:13.
- ASU – Stephen Baker 40-yard field goal, 5:40. Sun Devils 10–7. Drive: 7 plays, 16 yards, 2:17.
- ASU – Stephen Baker 35-yard field goal, 0:25. Sun Devils 13–7. Drive: 7 plays, 22 yards, 3:44.

Third quarter

- ASU – Delvon Flowers 40-yard run (John Leonard pass to Tariq McDonald), 12:03. Sun Devils 21–7. Drive: 3 plays, 77 yards, 1:15.
- ASU – J. R. Redmond 3-yard run (Stephen Baker kick), 8:49. Sun Devils 28–7. Drive: 6 plays, 66 yards, 2:03.
- ASU – Stephen Baker 34-yard field goal, 4:34. Sun Devils 31–7. Drive: 8 plays, 37 yards, 2:43.

Fourth quarter

- TTU – Aaron Hunt 53-yard fumble return (pass failed), 14:06. Sun Devils 31–13.

Top passers

- TTU – Rob Peters – 7/22, 124 yards, 2 INT
- ASU – John Leonard – 7/17, 117 yards

Top rushers

- TTU – Shaud Williams – 5 rushes, 40 yards
- ASU – J. R. Redmond – 20 rushes, 157 yards, 2 TD

Top receivers

- TTU – Sammy Morris – 3 receptions, 68 yards
- ASU – Tariq McDonald – 5 receptions, 47 yards

=== At Louisiana–Lafayette ===
Texas Tech Red Raiders at Louisiana–Lafayette Ragin' Cajuns – Game summary

Quarter	1	2	3	4	Total
Red Raiders	14	14	7	3	38
Ragin' Cajuns	10	7	0	0	17

at Cajun Field, Lafayette, Louisiana

- Date: September 11
- Game time: 7:00 p.m. CDT
- Game weather: Temperature: 85 °F (29 °C) • Weather: Clear • Wind: S 5 MPH
- Game attendance: 18,182
- Referee: S. Usechek
- Stats, Recap

Game information

First quarter

- UL – Brent Bergeron 20-yard field goal, 11:42. Ragin' Cajuns 3–0. Drive: 5 plays, 53 yards, 2:01.
- TTU – James Easterling 5-yard run (Chris Birkholz kick), 10:24. Red Raiders 7–3. Drive: 3 plays, 75 yards, 1:18.
- UL – Gerald Stewart 63-yard fumble return (Brent Bergeron kick), 6:31. Ragin' Cajuns 10–7.
- TTU – Shaud Williams 6-yard run (Chris Birkholz kick), 1:19. Red Raiders 14–10. Drive: 10 plays, 80 yards, 5:12.

Second quarter

- TTU – Tim Baker 55-yard pass from Rob Peters (Chris Birkholz kick), 11:30. Red Raiders 21–10. Drive: 7 plays, 79 yards, 1:45.
- UL – Travis Schwartz 34-yard interception return (Brent Bergeron kick), 10:10. Red Raiders 21–17.
- TTU – Derek Dorris 11-yard pass from Rob Peters (Chris Birkholz kick), 7:14. Red Raiders 28–17. Drive: 8 plays, 63 yards, 2:56.

Third quarter

- TTU – James Easterling 3-yard run (Chris Birkholz kick), 0:50. Red Raiders 35–17. Drive: 11 plays, 71 yards, 4:31.

Fourth quarter

- TTU – Chris Birkholz 29-yard field goal, 10:48. Red Raiders 38–17. Drive: 9 plays, 24 yards, 3:21.

Top passers

- TTU – Rob Peters – 11/21, 245 yards, 2 TD, 2 INT
- UL – Barton Folse – 8/11, 64 yards

Top rushers

- TTU – James Easterling – 25 rushes, 105 yards, 2 TD
- UL – Darren Brister – 9 rushes, 26 yards

Top receivers

- TTU – Tim Baker – 3 receptions, 74 yards, TD
- UL – Marcus Wilridge – 6 receptions, 80 yards

=== North Texas ===
North Texas Mean Green at Texas Tech Red Raiders – Game summary

Quarter	1	2	3	4	Total
Mean Green	0	7	14	0	21
Red Raiders	0	0	7	7	14

at Jones Stadium, Lubbock, Texas

- Date: September 18
- Game time: 6:00 p.m. CDT
- Game weather: Temperature: 82 °F (28 °C) • Weather: Clear • Wind: SW 10–20 MPH
- Game attendance: 45,824
- Referee: Rich Kollen
- Stats, Recap

Game information

First quarter

- No scoring plays

Second quarter

- UNT – Jeff Rodgers 27-yard interception return (Jason Ball kick), 13:07. Mean Green 7–0.

Third quarter

- TTU – Shaud Williams 6-yard run (Chris Birkholz kick), 8:39. Tied 7–7. Drive: 8 plays, 57 yards, 2:32.
- UNT – Michael Hickmon 1-yard run (Jason Ball kick), 7:08. Mean Green 14–7. Drive: 4 plays, 80 yards, 1:31.
- UNT – Broderick McGrew 46-yard pass from Jason Attaway (Jason Bell kick), 4:38. Mean Green 21–7. Drive: 1 play, 46 yards, 0:07.

Fourth quarter

- TTU – Shaud Williams 24-yard run (Chris Birkholz kick), 14:54. Mean Green 21–14. Drive: 11 plays, 88 yards, 4:44.

Top passers

- UNT – Jason Attaway – 3/10, 76 yards, TD
- TTU – Rob Peters – 15/29, 171 yards, 2 INT

Top rushers

- UNT – Ja'Quay Wilburn – 27 rushes, 148 yards
- TTU – Shaud Williams – 24 rushes, 151 yards, 2 TD

Top receivers

- UNT – Ladarrin McLane – 2 receptions, 30 yards
- TTU – Derek Dorris – 4 receptions, 40 yards

=== No. 5 Texas A&M ===
No. 5 Texas A&M Aggies at Texas Tech Red Raiders – Game summary

Quarter	1	2	3	4	Total
No. 5 Aggies	10	0	6	3	19
Red Raiders	0	21	0	0	21

at Jones Stadium, Lubbock, Texas

- Date: October 2
- Game time: 6:00 p.m. CDT
- Game weather: Temperature: 68 °F (20 °C) • Weather: Clear • Wind: E 10 MPH
- Game attendance: 53,513
- Referee: Randy Christal
- TV announcers (FSN): Ron Thulin, Artie Gigantino, and Eric Clemons
- Stats, Recap

Game information

First quarter

- TAMU – Terence Kitchens 36-yard field goal, 10:00. Aggies 3–0. Drive: 11 plays, 61 yards, 5:00.
- TAMU – Jay Brooks 9-yard blocked punt return (Terence Kitchens kick), 3:52. Aggies 10–0.

Second quarter

- TTU – Dee Jackson 15-yard pass from Rob Peters (Chris Birkholz kick), 12:18. Aggies 10–7. Drive: 6 plays, 46 yards, 2:25.
- TTU – Sammy Morris 2-yard run (Chris Birkholz kick), 9:48. Red Raiders 14–10. Drive: 4 plays, 60 yards, 0:33.
- TTU – Darrell Jones 9-yard pass from Rob Peters (Chris Birkholz kick), 0:25. Red Raiders 21–10. Drive: 8 plays, 69 yards, 2:03.

Third quarter

- TAMU – Terence Kitchens 27-yard field goal, 12:44. Red Raiders 21–13. Drive: 6 plays, 48 yards, 1:55.
- TAMU – Terence Kitchens 51-yard field goal, 6:15. Red Raiders 21–16. Drive: 7 plays, 23 yards, 2:03.

Fourth quarter

- TAMU – Terence Kitchens 27-yard field goal, 8:09. Red Raiders 21–19. Drive: 7 plays, 54 yards, 2:01.

Top passers

- TAMU – Randy McCown – 20/38, 273 yards, 2 INT
- TTU – Rob Peters – 13/18, 138 yards, 2 TD, INT

Top rushers

- TAMU – Randy McCown – 11 rushes, 33 yards
- TTU – Sammy Morris – 33 rushes, 170 yards, TD

Top receivers

- TAMU – Chris Taylor – 6 receptions, 103 yards
- TTU – Darrell Jones – 4 receptions, 46 yards, TD

=== At Oklahoma State ===
Texas Tech Red Raiders at Oklahoma State Cowboys – Game summary

Quarter	1	2	3	4	Total
Red Raiders	0	7	0	14	21
Cowboys	14	17	10	0	41

at Lewis Field, Stillwater, Oklahoma

- Date: October 9
- Game time: 7:00 p.m. CDT
- Game weather: Temperature: 76 °F (24 °C) • Weather: Partly cloudy • Wind: W 7 MPH
- Game attendance: 44,125
- Referee: John Laurie
- Stats, Recap

Game information

First quarter

- OKST – Terance Richardson 25-yard run (Seth Condley kick), 12:17. Cowboys 7–0. Drive: 7 plays, 63 yards, 2:43.
- OKST – B. J. Tiger 1-yard run (Seth Condley kick), 8:10. Cowboys 14–0. Drive: 6 plays, 30 yards, 2:52.

Second quarter

- OKST – Kevin Brown 4-yard pass from B. J. Tiger (Seth Condley kick), 11:53. Cowboys 21–0. Drive: 3 plays, 20 yards, 0:35.
- TTU – Kyle Allamon 29-yard pass from Rob Peters (Chris Birkholz kick), 4:25. Cowboys 21–7. Drive: 3 plays, 51 yards, 1:04.
- OKST – Jamaal Fobbs 51-yard pass from B. J. Tiger (Seth Condley kick), 3:39. Cowboys 28–7. Drive: 2 plays, 72 yards, 0:46.
- OKST – Seth Condley 37-yard field goal, 0:10. Cowboys 31–7. Drive: 8 plays, 37 yards, 1:02.

Third quarter

- OKST – Tim Sydnes 33-yard field goal, 11:49. Cowboys 34–7. Drive: 7 plays, 17 yards, 1:37.
- OKST – Nathan Simmons 3-yard run (Tim Sydnes kick), 10:41. Cowboys 41–7. Drive: 1 play, 3 yards, 0:03.

Fourth quarter

- TTU – Dee Jackson 9-yard pass from Kliff Kingsbury (Chris Birkholz kick), 4:36. Cowboys 41–14. Drive: 6 plays, 67 yards, 3:02.
- TTU – Rickey Hunter 4-yard run (Chris Birkholz kick), 1:06. Cowboys 41–21. Drive: 9 plays, 69 yards, 1:46.

Top passers

- TTU – Rob Peters – 7/18, 138 yards, TD
- OKST – B. J. Tiger – 15/25, 2 TD, INT

Top rushers

- TTU – Sammy Morris – 16 rushes, 40 yards
- OKST – B. J. Tiger – 11 rushes, 61 yards, TD

Top receivers

- TTU – Sammy Morris – 3 receptions, 95 yards
- OKST – Terance Richardson – 4 receptions, 36 yards

=== Colorado ===
Colorado Buffaloes at Texas Tech Red Raiders – Game summary

Quarter	1	2	3	4	Total
Buffaloes	0	0	7	3	10
Red Raiders	0	17	7	7	31

at Jones Stadium, Lubbock, Texas

- Date: October 16
- Game time: 2:30 p.m. CDT
- Game weather: Temperature: 63 °F (17 °C) • Weather: Clear • Wind: N 25 MPG
- Game attendance: 46,424
- Referee: Hal Dowden
- TV announcers (ABC): Tim Brant and Dean Blevins
- Stats, Recap

Game information

First quarter

- No scoring plays

Second quarter

- TTU – Derek Jones 13-yard pass from Rob Peters (Chris Birkholz kick), 9:53. Red Raiders 7–0. Drive: 4 plays, 80 yards, 1:44.
- TTU – Shaud Williams 3-yard run (Chris Birkholz kick), 8:41. Red Raiders 14–0. Drive: 3 plays, 27 yards, 1:12.
- TTU – Chris Birkholz 36-yard field goal, 2:09. Red Raiders 17–0. Drive: 10 plays, 62 yards, 2:06.

Third quarter

- CU – John Minardi 37-yard pass from Mike Moschetti (Jeremy Aldrich kick), 14:16. Red Raiders 17–7. Drive: 2 plays, 47 yards, 0:23.
- TTU – Derek Jones 13-yard pass from Rob Peters (Chris Birkholz kick), 12:55. Red Raiders 24–7. Drive: 3 plays, 80 yards, 1:21.

Fourth quarter

- CU – Jeremy Aldrich 45-yard field goal, 12:02. Red Raiders 24–10. Drive: 6 plays, 43 yards, 2:50.
- TTU – Shaud Williams 6-yard run (Chris Birkholz kick), 9:14. Red Raiders 31–10. Drive: 6 plays, 66 yards, 2:48.

Top passers

- CU – Mike Moschetti – 20/32, 194 yards, TD, INT
- TTU – Rob Peters – 15/23, 181 yards, 2 TD

Top rushers

- CU – Cortlen Johnson – 22 rushes, 107 yards
- TTU – Shaud Williams – 21 rushes, 230 yards, 2 TD

Top receivers

- CU – Cedric Cormier – 5 receptions, 27 yards
- TTU – Tim Baker – 4 receptions, 95 yards

=== At Baylor ===
Texas Tech Red Raiders at Baylor Bears – Game summary

Quarter	1	2	3	4	Total
Red Raiders	6	8	7	14	35
Bears	0	0	7	0	7

at Floyd Casey Stadium, Waco, Texas

- Date: October 23
- Game time: 6:00 p.m. CDT
- Game weather: Temperature: 75 °F (24 °C) • Weather: Clear, dry, and windy • Wind: N 15–25 MPH
- Game attendance: 27,815
- Referee: John Bible
- Stats, Recap

Game information

First quarter

- TTU – Chris Birkholz 41-yard field goal, 10:31. Red Raiders 3–0. Drive: 8 plays, 26 yards, 3:21.
- TTU – Chris Birkholz 40-yard field goal, 2:28. Red Raiders 6–0. Drive: 10 plays, 67 yards, 3:26.

Second quarter

- TTU – Rob Peters 1-yard run (Rob Peters pass to Tim Winn), 10:32. Red Raiders 14–0. Drive: 1 play, 1 yard, 0:09.

Third quarter

- BAY – Randy Davis 91-yard kickoff return (Kyle Atteberry kick), 14:44. Red Raiders 14–7.
- TTU – John Norman 80-yard punt return (Chris Birkholz kick), 2:50. Red Raiders 21–7.

Fourth quarter

- TTU – Sammy Morris 2-yard run (Chris Birkholz kick), 14:42. Red Raiders 28–7. Drive: 2 plays, 8 yards, 0:04.
- TTU – Darrell Jones 11-yard pass from Rob Peters (Chris Birkholz kick), 8:21. Red Raiders 35–7. Drive: 13 plays, 62 yards, 6:04.

Top passers

- TTU – Rob Peters – 11/22, 117 yards, TD
- BAY – Jermaine Alfred – 7/22, 67 yards, 2 INT

Top rushers

- TTU – Sammy Morris – 19 rushes, 98 yards, TD
- BAY – Darrell Bush – 19 rushes, 91 yards

Top receivers

- TTU – Tim Winn – 2 receptions, 31 yards
- BAY – Brandon Thompson – 3 receptions, 34 yards

=== At Missouri ===
Texas Tech Red Raiders at Missouri Tigers – Game summary

Quarter	1	2	3	4	Total
Red Raiders	7	0	0	0	7
Tigers	3	17	7	7	34

at Faurot Field, Columbia, Missouri

- Date: October 30
- Game time: 1:00 p.m. CDT
- Game weather: Temperature: 62 °F (17 °C) • Weather: Partly cloudy • Wind: S 10 MPH
- Game attendance: 52,982
- Referee: Terrance Turlington
- Stats, Recap

=== Iowa State ===
Iowa State Cyclones at Texas Tech Red Raiders – Game summary

Quarter	1	2	3	4	Total
Cyclones	6	3	7	0	16
Red Raiders	14	7	0	7	28

at Jones Stadium, Lubbock, Texas

- Date: November 6
- Game time: 1:00 p.m. CST
- Game weather: Temperature: 70 °F (21 °C) • Weather: Clear • Wind: S 10 MPH
- Game attendance: 41,691
- Referee: John Laurie
- Stats, Recap

=== At No. 10 Texas ===
Texas Tech Red Raiders at No. 10 Texas Longhorns – Game summary

Quarter	1	2	3	4	Total
Red Raiders	0	0	0	7	7
No. 10 Longhorns	7	14	17	20	58

at Darrell K Royal–Texas Memorial Stadium, Austin, Texas

- Date: November 13
- Game time: 6:00 p.m. CST
- Game weather: Temperature: 78 °F (26 °C) • Weather: Clear • Wind: SE 2 MPH
- Game attendance: 83,882
- Referee: Steve Usechek
- TV announcers (FSN): Ron Thulin, Artie Gigantino, and Eric Clemons
- Stats, Recap

=== Oklahoma ===
Oklahoma Sooners at Texas Tech Red Raiders – Game summary

Quarter	1	2	3	4	Total
Sooners	14	7	0	7	28
Red Raiders	10	3	18	7	38

at Jones Stadium, Lubbock, Texas

- Date: November 20
- Game time: 11:30 a.m. CST
- Game attendance: 42,020
- TV announcers (FSN): Drew Goodman, Keith Jackson, and Jim Knox
- Stats, Recap

Game information

First quarter

- TTU – Sammy Morris 32-yard pass from Kliff Kingsbury (Chris Birkholz kick), 14:03. Red Raiders 7–0. Drive: 2 plays, 30 yards, 0:16.
- TTU – Chris Birkholz 29-yard field goal, 8:54. Red Raiders 10–0. Drive: 5 plays, 67 yards, 1:49.
- OKLA – Quentin Griffin 1-yard run (Tim Duncan kick), 5:49. Red Raiders 10–7. Drive: 7 plays, 80 yards, 3:05.
- OKLA – Damien Mackey 44-yard pass from Josh Heupel (Tim Duncan kick), 0:05. Sooners 14–10. Drive: 5 plays, 65 yards, 1:53.

Second quarter

- OKLA – Quentin Griffin 13-yard run (Tim Duncan kick), 2:06. Sooners 21–10. Drive: 5 plays, 77 yards, 1:29.
- TTU – Chris Birkholz 47-yard field goal, 0:08. Sooners 21–13. Drive: 5 plays, 28 yards, 0:27.

Third quarter

- TTU – Chris Birkholz 36-yard field goal, 7:20. Sooners 21–16. Drive: 6 plays, 19 yards, 2:10.
- TTU – Kliff Kingsbury 1-yard run (Kingsbury pass to Morris), 4:39. Red Raiders 24–21. Drive: 2 plays, 1 yard, 0:33.
- TTU – Sammy Morris 67-yard pass from Kliff Kingsbury (Chris Birkholz kick), 1:13. Red Raiders 31–21. Drive: 1 play, 67 yards, 0:13.

Fourth quarter

- TTU – Tim Baker 18-yard pass from Kliff Kingsbury (Chris Birkholz kick), 3:54. Red Raiders 38–21. Drive: 8 plays, 40 yards, 4:01.
- OKLA – Josh Norman 1-yard run (Tim Duncan kick), 1:39. Red Raiders 38–28. Drive: 10 plays, 64 yards, 2:15.

Top passers

- OKLA – Josh Heupel – 32/50, 352 yards, TD, INT
- TTU – Kliff Kingsbury – 9/17, 259 yards, 3 TD

Top rushers

- OKLA – Quentin Griffin – 10 carries, 58 yards, 2 TD
- TTU – Sammy Morris – 20 carries, 51 yards

Top receivers

- OKLA – Brandon Daniels – 9 receptions, 94 yards
- TTU – Sammy Morris – 3 receptions, 103 yards, 2 TD

In Spike Dykes's final game as the Red Raiders' head coach, the team came back from a 21–13 halftime deficit to win 38–28 over the Sooners. Dykes finished his career at Texas Tech with an overall record of 82–67–1 through 13 seasons. Oklahoma's offensive coordinator, Mike Leach, would serve as Dyke's successor.

== Roster ==
1999 Texas Tech Red Raiders football team roster
Players
Coaches
Offense

Pos.	#	Name	Class
RB	2	Ricky Williams	Jr
RB	5	Sammy Morris	Sr
RB	8	Toby Shain	Fr
QB	9	Rob Peters	Sr
WR	10	Justin Reed	So
RB	12	Rickey Hunter	Jr
QB	15	Shae McCutchen	So
QB	16	Kliff Kingsbury	Fr
RB	19	Shaud Williams	Fr
WR	22	Derek Dorris	Jr
WR	24	King Scovell	So
RB	27	Rudy Renda	Sr
RB	32	James Easterling	Jr
RB	33	Toby Cantu	Sr
OT	57	Matt Heider	So
C	59	Kyle Sanders	Jr
C	60	Bryan Gaither	So
G	61	Curtis Lowery	Sr
OT	63	J. J. Williams	Fr
G	64	Beau Radney	Fr
C	65	Anthony Patricio	Sr
OT	66	Toby Cecil	Fr
G	67	Lance Williams	So
G	69	Dan Martin	Sr
OT	72	Rex Richards	Fr
G	73	John DePasquale	Jr
G	75	Jason May	So
OT	77	Paul Erickson	So
OT	79	Jonathan Gray	Jr
WR	81	Tim Baker	Jr
TE	84	Cole Roberts	Jr
WR	85	Dee Jackson	Jr
WR	87	Darrell Jones	So
TE	91	Tim Winn	Sr
TE	94	Kyle Allamon	Sr

Defense

Pos.	#	Name	Class
OLB	6	Paul McClendon	So
CB	7	Anthony Malbrough	Jr
CB	14	Ronald Ross	So
OLB	15	Dorian Pitts	Jr
S	19	Mark Washington	Jr
OLB	20	Keith Cockrum	Sr
CB	21	Brian Giddens	Jr
OLB	23	Reagan Bownds	Sr
ILB	26	Tim Duffie	Sr
CB	28	Oscar Solis	Sr
S	29	Anthony Terrell	So
CB	30	Antwan Alexander	Jr
S	31	Kevin Curtis	So
DE	37	Devin Lemons	Jr
OLB	38	John Norman	Jr
CB	39	Derrick Briggs	Jr
DT	42	Detwill Williams	So
OLB	46	Reggie Savage	Jr
ILB	47	Jonathan Hawkins	Jr
DE	51	Lawrence Flugence	Fr
ILB	52	Will Culpepper	Jr
ILB	53	Rusty Bucy	Jr
ILB	54	Paul Howard	Fr
NT	68	Shane Roberts	Sr
DT	76	Kris Kocurek	Jr
ILB	83	Kyle Shipley	Sr
NT	86	Terry Patton	Sr
DE	89	Taurus Rucker	Sr
DE	93	Zeno McCoy	Fr
DE	96	Duane Toliver	Jr
DT	97	Josh Page	Fr
DE	98	Aaron Hunt	Fr
NT	99	Robert Wyatt	Fr

Special teams

Pos.	#	Name	Class
P	7	Eric Rosiles	Jr
P	25	Brian Roberson	Sr
P	41	Charlie Robinson	So
K	49	Chris Birkholz	Jr

Head coach

- Spike Dykes

Coordinators/assistant coaches

- Rick Dykes
  Offensive coordinator
- John Goodner
  Defensive coordinator

Legend

- (C) Team captain
- (S) Suspended
- (I) Ineligible
- Injured
- Redshirt

Roster
Last update: August 20, 1999

== Team players drafted into the NFL ==
Player	Position	Round	Pick	NFL club
Anthony Malbrough	Defensive back	5	130	Cleveland Browns
Sammy Morris	Running back	5	156	Buffalo Bills
