= 1999 Oklahoma Sooners football team =

American college football season

1999 Oklahoma Sooners football

Independence Bowl, L 25–27 vs. Ole Miss
- Conference: Big 12 Conference
- South Division
- Record: 7–5 (5–3 Big 12)
- Head coach: Bob Stoops (1st season)
- Offensive coordinator: Mike Leach (1st season)
- Offensive scheme: Air raid
- Co-defensive coordinators: Mike Stoops (1st season); Brent Venables (1st season)
- Base defense: 4–3
- Captains: Cornelius Burton; Josh Heupel; Matt O'Neal; Rodney Rideau; Mike Thornton
- Home stadium: Oklahoma Memorial Stadium

1999 Big 12 Conference football standings
	Conf.			Overall
Team	W		L	W		L
North Division
No. 3 Nebraska xy$	7	–	1	12	–	1
No. 6 Kansas State x	7	–	1	11	–	1
Colorado	5	–	3	7	–	5
Kansas	3	–	5	5	–	7
Iowa State	1	–	7	4	–	7
Missouri	1	–	7	4	–	7
South Division
No. 21 Texas xy	6	–	2	9	–	5
Oklahoma	5	–	3	7	–	5
Texas Tech	5	–	3	6	–	5
No. 23 Texas A&M	5	–	3	8	–	4
Oklahoma State	3	–	5	5	–	6
Baylor	0	–	8	1	–	10
Championship: Nebraska 22, Texas 6
$ – BCS representative as conference champion; x – Division champion/co-champions; y – Championship game participant; Rankings from AP Poll

The 1999 Oklahoma Sooners football team represented the University of Oklahoma in the 1999 NCAA Division I-A football season, the 105th season of Sooner football. The team was led by first-year head coach Bob Stoops. They played their home games at Oklahoma Memorial Stadium in Norman, Oklahoma. They were a charter member of the Big 12 conference.

Conference play began with a win over the Baylor Bears at home on September 18, and ended at home with a win over the Oklahoma State Cowboys in the annual Bedlam Series on November 27. The Sooners finished the regular season 7–4 (5–3 in Big 12), tied with Texas A&M for second in the Big 12 South. They were invited to the Independence Bowl, where they lost to the Ole Miss Rebels, 27–25.

Following the season, Stockar McDougle was selected 20th overall in the 2000 NFL draft, along with William Bartee in the second round.

== Preseason ==
After five straight non–winning seasons and failing to make a bowl appearance for four straight years, University of Oklahoma Athletic director Joe Castiglione decided to fire third–year coach John Blake at the end of the 1998 regular season and hire University of Florida Defensive coordinator Bob Stoops to replace Blake. Others considered for the job included Barry Alvarez, Jim Donnan, Bob Toledo, Dennis Franchione, Tommy Bowden, Gary Barnett, and Mike Bellotti. The decision to promote a defensive coordinator to head coach ran contrary to the conventional wisdom of the time, but from the beginning Stoops was expected to be an exception to that theory, even without any experience calling offensive plays.

== Schedule ==
Date	Time	Opponent	Rank	Site	TV	Result	Attendance	Source
September 11	6:30 p.m.	Indiana State*		Oklahoma Memorial Stadium; Norman, OK		W 49–0	74,119	
September 18	11:30 a.m.	Baylor		Oklahoma Memorial Stadium; Norman, OK	FSN	W 41–10	74,309	
September 25	2:30 p.m.	at Louisville*		Papa John's Cardinal Stadium; Louisville, KY	FSN	W 42–21	41,214	
October 2	1:30 p.m.	at Notre Dame*	No. 23	Notre Dame Stadium; Notre Dame, IN	NBC	L 30–34	80,012	
October 9	2:30 p.m.	vs. No. 23 Texas		Cotton Bowl; Dallas, TX (Red River Shootout)	ABC	L 28–38	75,587	
October 23	6:00 p.m.	No. 13 Texas A&M^{†}		Oklahoma Memorial Stadium; Norman, OK	FSN	W 51–6	74,552	
October 30	2:30 p.m.	at Colorado	No. 24	Folsom Field; Boulder, CO	ABC	L 24–38	48,194	
November 6	2:00 p.m.	Missouri		Oklahoma Memorial Stadium; Norman, OK (rivalry)		W 37–0	74,966	
November 13	1:00 p.m.	at Iowa State		Jack Trice Stadium; Ames, IA		W 31–10	37,073	
November 20	11:30 a.m.	at Texas Tech		Jones Stadium; Lubbock, TX	FSN	L 28–38	42,020	
November 27	2:00 p.m.	Oklahoma State		Oklahoma Memorial Stadium; Norman, OK (Bedlam Series)	FSN	W 44–7	75,374	
December 31	7:30 p.m.	vs. Ole Miss*		Independence Stadium; Shreveport, LA (Independence Bowl)	ESPN	L 25–27	49,873	
*Non-conference game; ^{†}Homecoming; Rankings from AP Poll released prior to the game; All times are in Central time

== Rankings ==
Ranking movements Legend: ██ Increase in ranking ██ Decrease in ranking — = Not ranked
	Week																
Poll	Pre	1	2	3	4	5	6	7	8	9	10	11	12	13	14	15	Final
AP	—	—	—	—	—	23	—	—	—	24	—	—	—	—	—	—	—
Coaches Poll	—	—	—	—	—	25	—	—	—	—	—	—	—	—	—	—	—
BCS	Not released									—	—	—	—	—	—	—	Not released

== Game summaries ==
=== Indiana State ===
Indiana State Sycamores at Oklahoma Sooners

Team	1	2	3	4	Total
Sycamores	0	0	0	0	0
• Sooners	14	14	14	7	49

- Date: September 11
- Location: Oklahoma Memorial Stadium, Norman, Oklahoma
- Game attendance: 74,119

Scoring summary
1	OKLA	Woolfolk 19 yard pass from Heupel (Duncan kick)	OKLA 7–0
1	OKLA	Thornton 10 yard run (Duncan kick)	OKLA 14–0
2	OKLA	Norman 6 yard pass from Heupel (Duncan kick)	OKLA 21–0
2	OKLA	Jackson 5 yard pass from Heupel (Duncan kick)	OKLA 28–0
3	OKLA	McMillen 11 yard pass from Heupel (Duncan kick)	OKLA 35–0
3	OKLA	Littrell 3 yard run (Duncan kick)	OKLA 42–0
4	OKLA	Daniel 33 yard pass from Heupel (Duncan kick)	OKLA 49–0

Statistics	INST	OKLA
First downs	10	30
Total yards	195	507
Rushing yards	159	166
Passing yards	36	341
Turnovers	5	4
Time of possession	31:59	28:01

Team	Category	Player	Statistics
Indiana State	Passing	Sheraton Fox	2/8, 36 yards, INT
Indiana State	Rushing	Matt Nelson	9 rushes, 41 yards
Indiana State	Receiving	Matt Nelson	1 reception, 26 yards
Oklahoma	Passing	Josh Heupel	31/40, 341 yards, 5 TD, INT
Oklahoma	Rushing	Mike Thornton	19 rushes, 85 yards, TD
Oklahoma	Receiving	Andre Woolfolk	5 receptions, 61 yards, TD

=== Baylor ===
Baylor Bears at Oklahoma Sooners

Team	1	2	3	4	Total
Bears	0	3	0	7	10
• Sooners	14	7	3	17	41

- Date: September 18
- Location: Oklahoma Memorial Stadium, Norman, Oklahoma
- Game start: 12:30
- Game attendance: 74,309
- TV announcers (FSN): Drew Goodman (Play-by-play), Dave Lapham (Color), & Jim Knox (Sideline)

Scoring summary
1	OKLA	Littrell 6 yard run (Duncan kick)	OKLA 7–0
1	OKLA	Norman 7 yard pass from Heupel (Duncan kick)	OKLA 14–0
2	OKLA	Anderson 22 yard pass from Heupel (Duncan kick)	OKLA 21–0
2	BAY	Atteberry 35 yard field goal	OKLA 21–3
3	OKLA	Duncan 25 yard field goal	OKLA 24–3
4	OKLA	Hammons 7 yard pass from Heupel (Duncan kick)	OKLA 31–3
4	OKLA	Duncan 26 yard field goal	OKLA 34–3
4	BAY	Fuller 13 yard pass from Alfred (Atteberry kick)	OKLA 34–10
4	OKLA	R. Skinner 2 yard run (Duncan kick)	OKLA 41–10

Statistics	BAY	OKLA
First downs	12	30
Total yards	208	557
Rushing yards	51	128
Passing yards	157	429
Turnovers	2	3
Time of possession	28:15	31:45

Team	Category	Player	Statistics
Baylor	Passing	Jermaine Alfred	18/27, 165 yards, TD, 2 INT
Baylor	Rushing	Jermaine Alfred	11 rushes, 24 yards
Baylor	Receiving	Brandon Thompson	2 receptions, 34 yards
Oklahoma	Passing	Josh Heupel	37/54, 420 yards, 3 TD, 2 INT
Oklahoma	Rushing	Mike Thornton	14 rushes, 110 yards
Oklahoma	Receiving	Curtis Fagan	4 receptions, 54 yards

=== No. 13 Texas A&M ===
No. 13 Texas A&M Aggies at Oklahoma Sooners

Team	1	2	3	4	Total
No. 13 Aggies	0	6	0	0	6
• Sooners	17	17	14	3	51

- Date: October 23
- Location: Oklahoma Memorial Stadium, Norman, Oklahoma
- Game start: 7:00
- Game attendance: 74,552
- TV announcers (FSN): Ron Thulin (Play-by-play), Artie Gigantino (Color), & Eric Clemons (Sideline)
- Source: ESPN

Statistics	TAMU	OKLA
First downs	15	30
Total yards	230	552
Rushing yards	64	165
Passing yards	166	387
Turnovers	1	1
Time of possession	21:31	38:29

Team	Category	Player	Statistics
Texas A&M	Passing	Randy McCown	9/21, 131 yards, TD
Texas A&M	Rushing	Ja'Mar Toombs	11 rushes, 45 yards
Texas A&M	Receiving	Bethel Johnson	5 receptions, 64 yards
Oklahoma	Passing	Josh Heupel	31/50, 372 yards, 3 TD, INT
Oklahoma	Rushing	Reggie Skinner	15 rushes, 106 yards
Oklahoma	Receiving	Antwone Savage	3 receptions, 69 yards

=== At Colorado ===
No. 24 Oklahoma Sooners at Colorado Buffaloes

Team	1	2	3	4	Total
No. 24 Sooners	3	7	0	14	24
• Buffaloes	7	7	10	14	38

- Date: October 30
- Location: Folsom Field, Boulder, Colorado
- Game start: 3:30
- Game attendance: 48,194
- TV announcers (ABC): Brad Nessler (Play-by-play), Lynn Swann (Color), & Chip Tarkenton (Sideline)
- Source: USA Today

Scoring summary
1	OKLA	Duncan 27-yard field goal	OKLA 3-0
1	COL	Stiggers 14-yard pass from Moschetti (Aldrich kick)	COL 7-3
2	OKLA	Littrell recovered blocked punt in end zone (Duncan kick)	OKLA 10-7
2	COL	Green 49-yard pass from Moschetti (Aldrich kick)	COL 14-10
3	COL	Moschetti 1-yard run (Aldrich kick)	COL 21-10
3	COL	Aldrich 33-yard field goal	COL 24-10
4	OKLA	R. Skinner 6-yard pass from Heupel (Duncan kick)	COL 24-17
4	COL	Graham 14-yard pass from Moschetti (Aldrich kick)	COL 31-17
4	OKLA	J. Jackson 49-yard pass from Heupel (Duncan kick)	COL 31-24
4	COL	Green 88-yard pass from Moschetti (Aldrich kick)	COL 38-24

Statistics	OKLA	COL
First downs	17	24
Total yards	317	537
Rushing yards	-11	155
Passing yards	328	382
Turnovers	4	1
Time of possession	26:11	33:49

Team	Category	Player	Statistics
Oklahoma	Passing	Josh Heupel	26/58, 328 yards, 2 TD, 4 INT
Oklahoma	Rushing	Seth Littrell	3 rushes, 10 yards
Oklahoma	Receiving	Jarrail Jackson	7 receptions, 148 yards, TD
Colorado	Passing	Mike Moschetti	22/31, 382 yards, 4 TD, INT
Colorado	Rushing	Mike Moschetti	14 rushes, 64 yards, TD
Colorado	Receiving	Javon Green	3 receptions, 133 yards, 2 TD

=== At Texas Tech ===
Oklahoma Sooners at Texas Tech Red Raiders

Team	1	2	3	4	Total
Sooners	14	7	0	7	28
• Red Raiders	10	3	18	7	38

- Date: November 20
- Location: Jones Stadium, Lubbock, Texas
- Game start: 12:30
- Game attendance: 42,020
- TV announcers (FSN): Drew Goodman (Play-by-play), Keith Jackson (Color), & Jim Knox (Sideline)

Statistics	OKLA	TTU
First downs	21	14
Total yards	401	359
Rushing yards	49	100
Passing yards	352	259
Turnovers	3	0
Time of possession	29:43	30:17

Team	Category	Player	Statistics
Oklahoma	Passing	Josh Heupel	32/50, 352 yards, TD, INT
Oklahoma	Rushing	Quentin Griffin	10 rushes, 58 yards, 2 TD
Oklahoma	Receiving	Brandon Daniels	9 receptions, 94 yards
Texas Tech	Passing	Kliff Kingsbury	9/17, 259 yards, 3 TD
Texas Tech	Rushing	Sammy Morris	20 rushes, 51 yards
Texas Tech	Receiving	Sammy Morris	3 receptions, 103 yards, 2 TD

== Roster ==
1999 Oklahoma Sooners football team roster
Players
Coaches
Offense

Pos.	#	Name	Class
OL	64	Ryan Allen	Sr
TE	90	Matt Anderson	Sr
RB	9	Johnnie Balous	Sr
OL	76	Al Baysinger	Jr
WR	80	DaWight Benning	Fr
WR	46	Bart Brewer	Jr
OL	63	Jason Bronson	Jr
OL	59	Stephen Burcham	Jr
OL	69	Brad Davis	Fr
OL	68	Howard Duncan	So
RB	22	Quentin Griffin	Fr
QB	14	Josh Heupel (C)	Jr
QB	–	Nate Hybl	Fr
WR	1	Jarrail Jackson	Sr
RB	35	Seth Littrell	Jr
OL	78	Stockar McDougle	Sr
RB	30	Josh Norman	So
OL	60	Matt O'Neil (C)	Sr
WR	6	Antwone Savage	Fr
OL	75	Mike Skinner	Fr
TE	88	Trent Smith	Fr
RB	7	Mike Thornton (C)	Sr
QB	–	Jason White	Fr
QB	–	Chase Williams	Fr
WR	17	Andre Woolfolk	Fr

Defense

Pos.	#	Name	Class
LB	37	Brandon Babb	So
DB	28	William Bartee	Sr
DL	96	Chris Bellows	Fr
DL	95	Rocky Bright	Jr
DB	–	Curtis Brumble	Fr
DL	87	Cornelius Burton (C)	Sr
LB	20	Rocky Calmus	So
LB	10	Torrance Marshall	Jr
FS	45	Rodney Rideaux (C)	Sr
FS	38	Roy Williams	Fr
DL	96	Jeremy Wilson-Guest	Jr
CB	4	Pee Wee Woods	Sr
CB	2	Mike Woods	Sr

Special teams

Pos.	#	Name	Class
P, K	15	Tim Duncan	So
K	83	Jeff Ferguson	So
DS	73	Jeremy Hess	Fr
P	82	Parker Neal	So
DS	67	Ben Panter	So
K	42	Matt Reeves	Sr

Head coach

- Bob Stoops

Coordinators/assistant coaches

- Mike Leach – Offensive coordinator & quarterbacks
- Cale Gundy – Running backs
- Steve Spurrier Jr. – Wide receivers
- Jonathan Hayes – Tight ends & special teams
- Mark Mangino – Offensive line
- Mike Stoops – Co-defensive coordinator & defensive backs
- Brent Venables – Co-defensive coordinator & linebackers
- Jackie Shipp – Defensive line
- Bobby Jack Wright – Defensive ends

Legend

- (C) Team captain
- (S) Suspended
- (I) Ineligible
- Injured
- Redshirt

Roster

== 2000 NFL draft ==
The 2000 NFL draft was held on April 15–16, 2000 at Madison Square Garden in New York City. The following Oklahoma players were either selected or signed as undrafted free agents following the draft.

Player	Position	Round	Overall pick	NFL team
Stockar McDougle	G, T	1st	20	Detroit Lions
William Bartee	DB	2nd	54	Kansas City Chiefs
