= 1999 Texas A&M Aggies football team =

American college football season

1999 Texas A&M Aggies football

Alamo Bowl, L 0–24 vs. Penn State
- Conference: Big 12 Conference
- South Division

Ranking
- Coaches: No. 20
- AP: No. 23
- Record: 8–4 (5–3 Big 12)
- Head coach: R. C. Slocum (11th season)
- Offensive coordinator: Steve Kragthorpe (2nd season)
- Offensive scheme: Pro-style
- Defensive coordinator: Mike Hankwitz (3rd season)
- Base defense: 4–3
- Home stadium: Kyle Field

1999 Big 12 Conference football standings
	Conf.			Overall
Team	W		L	W		L
North Division
No. 3 Nebraska xy$	7	–	1	12	–	1
No. 6 Kansas State x	7	–	1	11	–	1
Colorado	5	–	3	7	–	5
Kansas	3	–	5	5	–	7
Iowa State	1	–	7	4	–	7
Missouri	1	–	7	4	–	7
South Division
No. 21 Texas xy	6	–	2	9	–	5
Oklahoma	5	–	3	7	–	5
Texas Tech	5	–	3	6	–	5
No. 23 Texas A&M	5	–	3	8	–	4
Oklahoma State	3	–	5	5	–	6
Baylor	0	–	8	1	–	10
Championship: Nebraska 22, Texas 6
$ – BCS representative as conference champion; x – Division champion/co-champions; y – Championship game participant; Rankings from AP Poll

The 1999 Texas A&M Aggies football team represented Texas A&M University as a member of the South Division of the Big 12 Conference during the 1999 NCAA Division I-A football season. Led by 11th-year head coach R. C. Slocum, the Aggies compiled an overall record of 8–4 with a mark of 5–3 in conference play, placing in a three-way tie for second in Big 12's South Division. Texas A&M was invited to the Alamo Bowl, where the Aggies lost to Penn State. The team played home games at Kyle Field in College Station, Texas.

== Schedule ==
Date	Time	Opponent	Rank	Site	TV	Result	Attendance	Source
September 4	7:00 pm	at Louisiana Tech*	No. 6	Independence Stadium; Shreveport, LA		W 37–17	40,328	
September 18	7:30 pm	Tulsa*	No. 7	Kyle Field; College Station, TX		W 62–13	67,647	
September 25	2:30 pm	Southern Miss*	No. 7	Kyle Field; College Station, TX	ABC	W 23–6	65,264	
October 2	6:00 pm	at Texas Tech	No. 5	Jones Stadium; Lubbock, TX (rivalry)	FSN	L 19–21	53,513	
October 9	1:00 pm	Baylor	No. 13	Kyle Field; College Station, TX (Battle of the Brazos)		W 45–13	75,476	
October 16	11:30 am	Kansas	No. 13	Kyle Field; College Station, TX	FSN	W 34–17	70,232	
October 23	6:00 pm	at Oklahoma	No. 13	Oklahoma Memorial Stadium; Norman, OK	FSN	L 6–51	74,552	
October 30	2:30 pm	Oklahoma State	No. 22	Kyle Field; College Station, TX		W 21–3	74,008	
November 6	2:30 pm	at No. 9 Nebraska	No. 21	Memorial Stadium; Lincoln, NE	ABC	L 0–37	77,705	
November 13	11:30 am	at Missouri	No. 24	Faurot Field; Columbia, MO	FSN	W 51–14	57,472	
November 26	10:00 am	No. 5 Texas	No. 24	Kyle Field; College Station, TX (rivalry)	ABC	W 20–16	86,128	
December 28	6:30 pm	vs. No. 13 Penn State*	No. 18	Alamodome; San Antonio, TX (Alamo Bowl)	ESPN	L 0–24	65,380	
*Non-conference game; Rankings from AP Poll released prior to the game; All times are in Central time

== Rankings ==
Ranking movements Legend: ██ Increase in ranking ██ Decrease in ranking — = Not ranked
	Week																
Poll	Pre	1	2	3	4	5	6	7	8	9	10	11	12	13	14	15	Final
AP	7	6	7	7	5	5	13	13	13	22	21	—	24	24	18	18	23
Coaches Poll	8	8*	7	7	6	6	12	11	10	18	18	23	20	17	14	13	20
BCS	Not released									—	—	—	—	—	15	14	Not released

== Game summaries ==
=== At Louisiana Tech ===
No. 6 Texas A&M Aggies at Louisiana Tech Bulldogs – Game summary

Quarter	1	2	3	4	Total
No. 6 Aggies	6	24	0	7	37
Bulldogs	0	10	7	0	17

at Independence Stadium, Shreveport, Louisiana

- Date: September 4
- Game time: 7:00 p.m. CDT
- Game weather: Chance of rain, 80 °F (27 °C)
- Game attendance: 40,328
- Referee: G. Gelbke
- Recap

Game information
First quarter
- TAMU – Terence Kitchens 50-yard field goal, 9:29. Aggies 3–0. Drive: 7 plays, 47 yards, 1:47.
- TAMU – Terence Kitchens 51-yard field goal, 3:55. Aggies 6–0. Drive: 8 plays, 26 yards, 4:05.

Second quarter

- LT – Josh Storrs 22-yard field goal, 12:04. Aggies 6–3. Drive: 15 plays, 73 yards, 6:51.
- TAMU – Dante Hall 18-yard run (Terence Kitchens kick), 10:36. Aggies 13–3. Drive: 5 plays, 73 yards, 1:28.
- TAMU – Chris Taylor 23-yard pass from Randy McCown (Terence Kitchens kick), 8:38. Aggies 20–3. Drive: 1 play, 23 yards, 0:05.
- LT – Delwyn Daigre 15-yard pass from Tim Rattay (Josh Storrs kick), 5:06. Aggies 20–10. Drive: 11 plays, 70 yards, 3:32.
- TAMU – Ja'Mar Toombs 1-yard run (Terence Kitchens kick), 2:04. Aggies 27–10. Drive: 8 plays, 75 yards, 3:02.
- TAMU – Terence Kitchens 26-yard field goal, 0:00. Aggies 30–10. Drive: 6 plays, 68 yards, 0:57.

Third quarter

- LT – Delwyn Daigre 8-yard pass from Tim Rattay (Josh Storrs kick), 9:06. Aggies 30–17. Drive: 14 plays, 63 yards, 4:24.

Fourth quarter

- TAMU – Bethel Johnson 12-yard pass from Randy McCown (Terence Kitchens kick), 0:47. Aggies 37–17. Drive: 6 plays, 48 yards, 2:39.

Statistics	TAMU	LT
First downs	24	27
Total yards	471	370
Rushing yards	219	10
Passing yards	252	360
Turnovers	3	3
Time of possession	27:26	32:34

Team	Category	Player	Statistics
Texas A&M	Passing	Randy McCown	17/28, 252 yards, 2 TD
Texas A&M	Rushing	Dante Hall	12 rushes, 71 yards, TD
Texas A&M	Receiving	Bethel Johnson	4 receptions, 106 yards, TD
Louisiana Tech	Passing	Tim Rattay	45/65, 331 yards, 2 TD, 2 INT
Louisiana Tech	Rushing	Bobby Ray Tell	15 rushes, 17 yards
Louisiana Tech	Receiving	Delwyn Daigre	12 receptions, 104 yards, 2 TD

=== Tulsa ===
Tulsa Golden Hurricane at No. 7 Texas A&M Aggies – Game summary

Quarter	1	2	3	4	Total
Golden Hurricane	7	0	6	0	13
No. 7 Aggies	3	28	7	24	62

at Kyle Field, College Station, Texas

- Date: September 18
- Game time: 7:30 p.m. CDT
- Game attendance: 67,647
- Recap

Statistics	TLSA	TAMU
First downs	8	30
Total yards	192	606
Rushing yards	40	217
Passing yards	152	389
Turnovers	6	3
Time of possession		

Team	Category	Player	Statistics
Tulsa	Passing	Josh Blankenship	5/18 109 Yards 2 INT
Tulsa	Rushing	Ken Bohanon	14 rushes 31 Yards 1 TD
Tulsa	Receiving	Damon Savage	5 Receptions 40 Yards 1 TD
Texas A&M	Passing	Randy McCown	13/30 320 Yards 2 TD 2 INT
Texas A&M	Rushing	Joe Weber	13 rushes 54 Yards
Texas A&M	Receiving	Chris Taylor	6 Receptions 177 Yards 1 TD

=== Southern Miss ===
Southern Miss Golden Eagles at No. 7 Texas A&M Aggies – Game summary

Quarter	1	2	3	4	Total
Golden Eagles	0	0	0	6	6
No. 7 Aggies	3	6	7	7	23

at Kyle Field, College Station, Texas

- Date: September 25
- Game time: 2:30 p.m. CDT
- Game attendance: 65,264
- TV announcers (ABC): Tim Brant and Dean Blevins
- Recap

Statistics	USM	TAMU
First downs		
Total yards		
Rushing yards		
Passing yards		
Turnovers		
Time of possession		

Team	Category	Player	Statistics
Southern Miss	Passing		
Southern Miss	Rushing		
Southern Miss	Receiving		
Texas A&M	Passing		
Texas A&M	Rushing		
Texas A&M	Receiving		

=== At Texas Tech ===
No. 5 Texas A&M Aggies at Texas Tech Red Raiders – Game summary

Quarter	1	2	3	4	Total
No. 5 Aggies	10	0	6	3	19
Red Raiders	0	21	0	0	21

at Jones Stadium, Lubbock, Texas

- Date: October 2
- Game time: 6:00 p.m. CDT
- Game weather: Clear, 68 °F (20 °C)
- Game attendance: 53,513
- Referee: Randy Christal
- TV announcers (FSN): Ron Thulin, Artie Gigantino, and Eric Clemons
- Recap

Game information
First quarter
- TAMU – Terence Kitchens 36-yard field goal, 10:00. Aggies 3–0. Drive: 11 plays, 61 yards, 5:00.
- TAMU – Jay Brooks 9-yard blocked punt return (Terence Kitchens kick), 3:52. Aggies 10–0.

Second quarter

- TTU – Dee Jackson 15-yard pass from Rob Peters (Chris Birkholz kick), 12:18. Aggies 10–7. Drive: 6 plays, 46 yards, 2:25.
- TTU – Sammy Morris 2-yard run (Chris Birkholz kick), 9:48. Red Raiders 14–10. Drive: 4 plays, 60 yards, 0:33.
- TTU – Darrell Jones 9-yard pass from Rob Peters (Chris Birkholz kick), 0:25. Red Raiders 21–10. Drive: 8 plays, 69 yards, 2:03.

Third quarter

- TAMU – Terence Kitchens 27-yard field goal, 12:44. Red Raiders 21–13. Drive: 6 plays, 48 yards, 1:55.
- TAMU – Terence Kitchens 51-yard field goal, 6:15. Red Raiders 21–16. Drive: 7 plays, 23 yards, 2:03.

Fourth quarter

- TAMU – Terence Kitchens 27-yard field goal, 8:09. Red Raiders 21–19. Drive: 7 plays, 54 yards, 2:01.

Statistics	TAMU	TTU
First downs	17	23
Total yards	325	333
Rushing yards	52	185
Passing yards	273	148
Turnovers	3	1
Time of possession	27:44	32:16

Team	Category	Player	Statistics
Texas A&M	Passing	Randy McCown	20/38, 273 yards, 2 INT
Texas A&M	Rushing	Randy McCown	11 rushes, 33 yards
Texas A&M	Receiving	Chris Taylor	6 receptions, 103 yards
Texas Tech	Passing	Rob Peters	13/18, 138 yards, 2 TD, INT
Texas Tech	Rushing	Sammy Morris	33 rushes, 170 yards, TD
Texas Tech	Receiving	Darrell Jones	4 receptions, 46 yards, TD

=== Baylor ===
Baylor Bears at No. 13 Texas A&M Aggies – Game summary

Quarter	1	2	3	4	Total
Bears	3	3	0	7	13
No. 13 Aggies	7	10	21	7	45

at Kyle Field, College Station, Texas

- Date: October 9
- Game time: 1:00 p.m. CDT
- Game attendance: 75,476
- Recap

Statistics	BAY	TAMU
First downs		
Total yards		
Rushing yards		
Passing yards		
Turnovers		
Time of possession		

Team	Category	Player	Statistics
Baylor	Passing		
Baylor	Rushing		
Baylor	Receiving		
Texas A&M	Passing		
Texas A&M	Rushing		
Texas A&M	Receiving		

=== Kansas ===
Kansas Jayhawks at No. 13 Texas A&M Aggies – Game summary

Quarter	1	2	3	4	Total
Jayhawks	0	10	7	0	17
No. 13 Aggies	0	17	10	7	34

at Kyle Field, College Station, Texas

- Date: October 16
- Game time: 11:30 a.m. CDT
- Game attendance: 70,232
- TV announcers (FSN): Drew Goodman, Dave Lapham, and Jim Knox
- Recap

Statistics	KU	TAMU
First downs		
Total yards		
Rushing yards		
Passing yards		
Turnovers		
Time of possession		

Team	Category	Player	Statistics
Kansas	Passing		
Kansas	Rushing		
Kansas	Receiving		
Texas A&M	Passing		
Texas A&M	Rushing		
Texas A&M	Receiving		

=== At Oklahoma ===
No. 13 Texas A&M Aggies at Oklahoma Sooners – Game summary

Quarter	1	2	3	4	Total
No. 13 Aggies	0	6	0	0	6
Sooners	17	17	14	3	51

at Oklahoma Memorial Stadium, Norman, Oklahoma

- Date: October 23
- Game time: 6:00 p.m. CDT
- Game attendance: 74,552
- TV announcers (FSN): Ron Thulin, Artie Gigantino, and Eric Clemons
- ESPN box score, Recap

Game information
First quarter
- OKLA – Josh Heupel 1-yard run (Tim Duncan kick). Sooners 7–0.
- OKLA – Curtis Fagan 8-yard pass from Josh Heupel (Tim Duncan kick). Sooners 14–0.
- OKLA – Tim Duncan 19-yard field goal. Sooners 17–0.

Second quarter

- OKLA – Josh Heupel 1-yard run (Tim Duncan kick). Sooners 24–0.
- OKLA – Tim Duncan 27-yard field goal. Sooners 27–0.
- TAMU – Chris Taylor 37-yard pass from Randy McCown (pass failed). Sooners 27–6.
- OKLA – Josh Heupel 1-yard run (Tim Duncan kick). Sooners 34–6.

Third quarter

- OKLA – Trent Smith 22-yard pass from Josh Heupel (Tim Duncan kick). Sooners 41–6.
- OKLA – Brandon Daniels 26-yard pass from Josh Heupel (Tim Duncan kick). Sooners 48–6.

Fourth quarter

- OKLA – Tim Duncan 27-yard field goal. Sooners 51–6.

Statistics	TAMU	OKLA
First downs	15	30
Total yards	230	552
Rushing yards	64	165
Passing yards	166	387
Turnovers	1	1
Time of possession	21:31	38:29

Team	Category	Player	Statistics
Texas A&M	Passing	Randy McCown	9/21, 131 yards, TD
Texas A&M	Rushing	Ja'Mar Toombs	11 rushes, 45 yards
Texas A&M	Receiving	Bethel Johnson	5 receptions, 64 yards
Oklahoma	Passing	Josh Heupel	31/50, 372 yards, 3 TD, INT
Oklahoma	Rushing	Reggie Skinner	15 rushes, 106 yards
Oklahoma	Receiving	Antwone Savage	3 receptions, 69 yards

=== Oklahoma State ===
Oklahoma State Cowboys at No. 22 Texas A&M Aggies – Game summary

Quarter	1	2	3	4	Total
Cowboys	0	0	0	3	3
No. 22 Aggies	0	7	7	7	21

at Kyle Field, College Station, Texas

- Date: October 30
- Game time: 2:30 p.m. CST
- Game attendance: 74,008
- Recap

Statistics	OKST	TAMU
First downs		
Total yards		
Rushing yards		
Passing yards		
Turnovers		
Time of possession		

Team	Category	Player	Statistics
Oklahoma State	Passing		
Oklahoma State	Rushing		
Oklahoma State	Receiving		
Texas A&M	Passing		
Texas A&M	Rushing		
Texas A&M	Receiving		

=== At No. 9 Nebraska ===
No. 21 Texas A&M Aggies at No. 9 Nebraska Cornhuskers – Game summary

Quarter	1	2	3	4	Total
No. 21 Aggies	0	0	0	0	0
No. 9 Cornhuskers	0	6	17	14	37

at Memorial Stadium, Lincoln, Nebraska

- Date: November 6
- Game time: 2:30 p.m. CST
- Game attendance: 77,705
- TV announcers (ABC): Brent Musburger, Gary Danielson, and Jack Arute
- Recap

Statistics	TAMU	NEB
First downs		
Total yards		
Rushing yards		
Passing yards		
Turnovers		
Time of possession		

Team	Category	Player	Statistics
Texas A&M	Passing		
Texas A&M	Rushing		
Texas A&M	Receiving		
Nebraska	Passing		
Nebraska	Rushing		
Nebraska	Receiving		

=== At Missouri ===
No. 24 Texas A&M Aggies at Missouri Tigers – Game summary

Quarter	1	2	3	4	Total
No. 24 Aggies	7	0	24	20	51
Tigers	0	0	0	14	14

at Faurot Field, Columbia, Missouri

- Date: November 13
- Game time: 11:30 a.m. CST
- Game attendance: 57,472
- TV announcers (FSN): Drew Goodman, Dave Lapham, and Jim Knox
- Recap

Statistics	TAMU	MIZ
First downs		
Total yards		
Rushing yards		
Passing yards		
Turnovers		
Time of possession		

Team	Category	Player	Statistics
Texas A&M	Passing		
Texas A&M	Rushing		
Texas A&M	Receiving		
Missouri	Passing		
Missouri	Rushing		
Missouri	Receiving		

=== No. 5 Texas ===
No. 5 Texas Longhorns at No. 24 Texas A&M Aggies – Game summary

Quarter	1	2	3	4	Total
No. 5 Longhorns	2	14	0	0	16
No. 24 Aggies	6	0	7	7	20

at Kyle Field, College Station, Texas

- Date: November 26
- Game time: 10:00 a.m. CST
- Game attendance: 86,128
- TV announcers (ABC): Tim Brant, Dean Blevins, and Chip Tarkenton
- Recap

Game information
First quarter
- TAMU – Ja'Mar Toombs 3-yard run (pass failed), 3:49. Aggies 6–0. Drive: 8 plays, 52 yards, 4:06.
- TEX – Lee Jackson defensive PAT return, 3:49. Aggies 6–2.

Second quarter

- TEX – Hodges Mitchell 14-yard run (Kris Stockton kick), 14:11. Longhorns 9–6. Drive: 4 plays, 37 yards, 1:14.
- TEX – Chris Robertson 1-yard run (Kris Stockton kick), 5:19. Longhorns 16–6. Drive: 14 plays, 66 yards, 5:52.

Third quarter

- TAMU – Ja'Mar Toombs 9-yard run (Shane Lechler kick), 4:47. Longhorns 16–13. Drive: 5 plays, 46 yards, 1:41.

Fourth quarter

- TAMU – Matt Bumgardner 14-yard pass from Randy McCown (Shane Lechler kick), 5:02. Aggies 20–16. Drive: 8 plays, 48 yards, 3:28.

Statistics	TEX	TAMU
First downs	14	15
Total yards	272	278
Rushing yards	89	122
Passing yards	183	156
Turnovers	3	2
Time of possession	27:51	32:09

Team	Category	Player	Statistics
Texas	Passing	Chris Simms	10/21, 130 yards, INT
Texas	Rushing	Hodges Mitchell	24 rushes, 102 yards, TD
Texas	Receiving	Kwame Cavil	10 receptions, 82 yards
Texas A&M	Passing	Randy McCown	8/22, 156 yards, TD
Texas A&M	Rushing	Ja'Mar Toombs	37 rushes, 126 yards, 2 TD
Texas A&M	Receiving	Chris Cole	4 receptions, 84 yards

A week before the game, the annual Aggie Bonfire collapsed, killing 12 people and injuring another 27. The respective marching bands dedicated their halftime performances to those lost and injured in the collapse.

=== Vs. No. 13 Penn State (Alamo Bowl) ===
1999 Alamo Bowl
No. 13 Penn State Nittany Lions vs. No. 18 Texas A&M Aggies – Game summary

Quarter	1	2	3	4	Total
No. 13 Nittany Lions	7	7	0	10	24
No. 18 Aggies	0	0	0	0	0

at Alamodome, San Antonio, Texas

- Date: December 28
- Game time: 6:30 p.m. CST
- Game weather: None (played indoors)
- Game attendance: 65,380
- Referee: Rom Gilbert
- TV announcers (ESPN): Ron Franklin, Mike Gottfried, and Adrian Karsten
- ESPN box score, Recap

Game information
First quarter
- PSU – Derek Fox 34-yard interception return (Travis Forney kick). Nittany Lions 7–0.

Second quarter

- PSU – Eddie Drummond 45-yard pass from Rashard Casey (Travis Forney kick). Nittany Lions 14–0.

Third quarter

- No scoring plays

Fourth quarter

- PSU – Rashard Casey 4-yard run (Travis Forney kick). Nittany Lions 21–0.
- PSU – Travis Forney 39-yard field goal. Nittany Lions 24–0.

Statistics	PSU	TAMU
First downs	17	16
Total yards	321	202
Rushing yards	175	80
Passing yards	146	122
Turnovers	1	5
Time of possession	29:23	30:37

Team	Category	Player	Statistics
Penn State	Passing	Rashard Casey	8/16, 146 yards, TD, INT
Penn State	Rushing	Eric McCoo	6 rushes, 43 yards
Penn State	Receiving	Eddie Drummond	1 reception, 45 yards, TD
Texas A&M	Passing	Randy McCown	13/22, 105 yards, 4 INT
Texas A&M	Rushing	Ja'Mar Toombs	19 rushes, 70 yards
Texas A&M	Receiving	Matt Bumgardner	5 receptions, 59 yards

== Roster ==
1999 Texas A&M Aggies football team roster
Players
Coaches
Offense

Pos.	#	Name	Class
RB	3	Eric Bernard	Sr
WR	4	Dwain Goynes	Fr
RB	5	Ja'Mar Toombs	So
WR	7	Chris Taylor	Jr
QB	8	Vance Smith	Fr
WR	9	Bethel Johnson	Fr
QB	10	Mark Farris	Fr
QB	11	Colby Freeman	Fr
QB	14	Ry Marek	So
QB	15	Randy McCown	Sr
WR	19	Antoine Gandy	So
RB	20	D'Andre Hardeman	Sr
RB	24	Richard Whitaker	Fr
WR	25	Michael Jennings	Sr
RB	26	Oschlor Flemming	Fr
RB	27	Jesse Hunnicut	Fr
RB	28	Joe Weber	Fr
RB	29	Maurice Harris	Fr
RB	32	Burnest Rhodes	Jr
RB	34	Dante Hall	Sr
OL	50	John Kirk	Fr
OL	51	Taylor Whitley	Fr
OL	54	James Milkavich	Fr
OL	56	Toby McCarthy	Jr
OL	58	Chris Thierry	Sr
OL	62	Semisi Heimuli	Sr
OL	65	Andre Brooks	Fr
OL	68	Brett Lively	Fr
OL	70	Moses Vakalahi	So
OL	71	Chris Valletta	Jr
OL	72	Billy Yates	Fr
OL	73	Alan Reuber	Fr
OL	74	Tango McCauley	So
OL	75	Chris Montgomery	Fr
OL	76	Michael Mahan	Fr
OL	77	Seth McKinney	So
OL	78	Andy Vincent	Sr
OL	79	Shea Holder	Sr
WR	80	Chris Cole	Sr
WR	81	Matt Bumgardner	Sr
TE	82	RoDerrick Broughton	Jr
WR	83	Mickey Jones	So
TE	84	Tashumbrae' Brown	Fr
WR	85	Greg Porter	Fr
TE	86	Fred Spiller	Fr
TE	87	Michael de la Torre	Fr
WR	88	Leroy Hodges	Sr

Defense

Pos.	#	Name	Class
DB	1	Michael Jameson	Jr
LB	2	Christian Rodriguez	So
LB	17	Brian Gamble	Fr
DB	18	Sedrick Curry	Sr
DB	21	Jay Brooks	So
DB	22	Sammy Davis	Fr
LB	23	Jason Glenn	Jr
DB	30	Brandon Jennings	Sr
LB	33	Damien West	Fr
DB	35	Jason Frederick	Fr
DB	36	Ronald Patton	Jr
DB	38	Ellison Collins	Fr
DB	39	Jason Webster	Sr
LB	40	Roylin Bradley	Jr
LB	41	Harold Robertson	So
DB	42	Everett Smith	Fr
LB	43	Jarrod Penright	Fr
LB	44	Sean Coryatt	Sr
LB	45	Jared Morris	Fr
LB	46	Cornelius Anthony	Jr
DB	47	Jeremy Weisinger	Sr
DB	48	Terrence Kiel	Fr
DB	49	Sean Weston	Fr
LB	52	Amon Simon	So
LB	53	Toron Wooldridge	Fr
DE	55	Terry Nichols	So
LB	59	Chad Frantzen	Sr
DL	64	Brian West	Fr
LB	66	Jason LeDoux	Fr
DL	90	Mike Kazmierski
DL	90	Stephen Young	Jr
DL	93	Evan Perroni	So
DL	94	Ty Warren	Fr
DL	95	Rocky Bernard	So
DL	96	Ron Edwards	Jr
DL	97	Lonnie Madison	So
DL	98	Shannon Mitchell	Fr
DL	99	Rondald Flemons	Jr

Special teams

Pos.	#	Name	Class
P	6	Shane Lechler	Sr
K	13	Terence Kitchens	Jr
P	16	Derek Lechler	Fr
K	37	Russell Bynum	Jr

Head coach

- R. C. Slocum

Coordinators/assistant coaches

- Steve Kragthorpe
  Offensive coordinator/quarterbacks
- Mike Hankwitz
  Defensive coordinator/linebackers/punters

Legend

- (C) Team captain
- (S) Suspended
- (I) Ineligible
- Injured
- Redshirt

Roster
