= 1999 Baylor Bears football team =

American college football season

1999 Baylor Bears football
- Conference: Big 12 Conference
- South Division
- Record: 1–10 (0–8 Big 12)
- Head coach: Kevin Steele (1st season)
- Offensive coordinator: Greg Meyer (1st season)
- Offensive scheme: Pro-style
- Defensive coordinator: Brick Haley (1st season)
- Base defense: 4–3
- Home stadium: Floyd Casey Stadium

1999 Big 12 Conference football standings
	Conf.			Overall
Team	W		L	W		L
North Division
No. 3 Nebraska xy$	7	–	1	12	–	1
No. 6 Kansas State x	7	–	1	11	–	1
Colorado	5	–	3	7	–	5
Kansas	3	–	5	5	–	7
Iowa State	1	–	7	4	–	7
Missouri	1	–	7	4	–	7
South Division
No. 21 Texas xy	6	–	2	9	–	5
Oklahoma	5	–	3	7	–	5
Texas Tech	5	–	3	6	–	5
No. 23 Texas A&M	5	–	3	8	–	4
Oklahoma State	3	–	5	5	–	6
Baylor	0	–	8	1	–	10
Championship: Nebraska 22, Texas 6
$ – BCS representative as conference champion; x – Division champion/co-champions; y – Championship game participant; Rankings from AP Poll

The 1999 Baylor Bears football team represented Baylor University as a member of the South Division of the Big 12 Conference during the 1999 NCAA Division I-A football season. Led by first-year head coach Kevin Steele, the Bears compiled an overall record of 1–10 with a mark of 0–8 in conference play, placing last out of six teams in the Big 12's South Division. The team played home games at Floyd Casey Stadium in Waco, Texas.

== Schedule ==
Date	Time	Opponent	Site	TV	Result	Attendance
September 4	11:00 a.m.	at Boston College*	Alumni Stadium; Chestnut Hill, MA	ESPN	L 29–30 ^{OT}	39,756
September 11	6:00 p.m.	UNLV*	Floyd Casey Stadium; Waco, TX		L 24–27	32,272
September 18	11:30 a.m.	at Oklahoma	Oklahoma Memorial Stadium; Norman, OK	FSN	L 10–41	74,309
September 25	6:00 p.m.	No. 22 Texas	Floyd Casey Stadium; Waco, TX (rivalry)		L 0–62	41,784
September 29	6:00 p.m.	North Texas*	Floyd Casey Stadium; Waco, TX		W 23–10	28,743
October 9	1:00 p.m.	at No. 12 Texas A&M	Kyle Field; College Station, TX (Battle of the Brazos)		L 13–45	75,476
October 23	6:00 p.m.	Texas Tech^{†}	Floyd Casey Stadium; Waco, TX (rivalry)		L 7–35	27,815
October 13	1:10 p.m.	at No. 6 Kansas State	KSU Stadium; Manhattan, KS		L 7–48	49,732
November 6	1:00 p.m.	at Kansas	Memorial Stadium; Lawrence, KS		L 10–45	28,600
November 13	1:00 p.m.	Colorado^{†}	Floyd Casey Stadium; Waco, TX		L 0–37	25,726
November 20	1:00 p.m.	Oklahoma State	Floyd Casey Stadium; Waco, TX		L 14–34	18,673
*Non-conference game; ^{†}Homecoming; Rankings from AP Poll released prior to the game; All times are in Central time
