= 1999 Big 12 Championship Game =

- Conference Championship
Nebraska Cornhuskers	Texas Longhorns
(10–1)	(9–3)
22	6
Head coach: Frank Solich	Head coach: Mack Brown
AP / Coaches / BCS; 3 / 3 / 3	AP / Coaches / BCS; 12 / 12 / 11
	1	2	3	4	Total
Nebraska	10	5	7	0	22
Texas	0	0	0	6	6
- Date: December 4, 1999
- Season: 1999
- Stadium: Alamodome
- Location: San Antonio, Texas
- Referee: Hal Dowden
- Attendance: 65,035

United States TV coverage
- Network: ABC
- Announcers: Brent Musburger and Gary Danielson

1999 Big 12 Conference football standings
	Conf.			Overall
Team	W		L	W		L
North Division
No. 3 Nebraska xy$	7	–	1	12	–	1
No. 6 Kansas State x	7	–	1	11	–	1
Colorado	5	–	3	7	–	5
Kansas	3	–	5	5	–	7
Iowa State	1	–	7	4	–	7
Missouri	1	–	7	4	–	7
South Division
No. 21 Texas xy	6	–	2	9	–	5
Oklahoma	5	–	3	7	–	5
Texas Tech	5	–	3	6	–	5
No. 23 Texas A&M	5	–	3	8	–	4
Oklahoma State	3	–	5	5	–	6
Baylor	0	–	8	1	–	10
Championship: Nebraska 22, Texas 6
$ – BCS representative as conference champion; x – Division champion/co-champions; y – Championship game participant; Rankings from AP Poll

The 1999 Big 12 Championship Game was a college football game played on Saturday, December 4, 1999, at the Alamodome in San Antonio. This was the 4th Big 12 Championship Game and determined the 1999 champion of the Big 12 Conference. The game featured the Nebraska Cornhuskers, champions of the North division, and the Texas Longhorns, champions of the South division. Both teams had faced each other earlier in the regular season, with the Longhorns defeating the Cornhuskers 24–20. However in the rematch in the championship game, Nebraska would defeat them 22–6 and secure the Big 12 title.

== Game summary ==
1999 Big 12 Championship Game

Quarter	1	2	3	4	Total
No. 3 Nebraska	10	5	7	0	22
No. 12 Texas	0	0	0	6	6

at Alamodome • San Antonio, Texas

- Date: December 4, 1999
- Game time: 2:30 p.m. CST
- TV announcers (ABC): Brent Musburger and Gary Danielson
- Big 12 game summary

Game information

First quarter
Second quarter
Third quarter
Fourth quarter

=== Statistics ===
Statistics	NEB	TEX
First downs	14	15
Plays–yards		
Rushes–yards		
Passing yards		
Passing: comp–att–int		
Time of possession	37:51	22:09

Team	Category	Player	Statistics
Nebraska	Passing		
Nebraska	Rushing		
Nebraska	Receiving		
Texas	Passing		
Texas	Rushing		
Texas	Receiving		
