= 1999 Holiday Bowl =

1999 Culligan Holiday Bowl
Kansas State Wildcats	Washington Huskies
(10-1)	(7-4)
Big 12	Pac-10
24	20
Head coach: Bill Snyder	Head coach: Rick Neuheisel
AP / Coaches / BCS; 7 / 7 / 6
	1	2	3	4	Total
Kansas State	7	3	7	7	24
Washington	6	7	7	0	20
- Date: December 29, 1999
- Season: 1999
- Stadium: Qualcomm Stadium
- Location: San Diego, California
- MVP: Offensive: Jonathan Beasley, Kansas State; Defensive: Darren Howard, Kansas State
- Halftime show: Marching bands
- Attendance: 57,118
- Payout: US$1,960,000 per team

United States TV coverage
- Network: ESPN
- Announcers: Mike Tirico (Play by Play); Lee Corso (Analyst); Kirk Herbstreit (Analyst); Dr. Jerry Punch (Sideline)

The 1999 Holiday Bowl was a college football bowl game played December 29, 1999, in San Diego, California. It was part of the 1999 NCAA Division I-A football season. It featured the Kansas State Wildcats, and the Washington Huskies.

Washington scored the first points of the game, after a 39-yard John Anderson field goal, giving Washington an early 3–0 lead. Kansas State responded with a 1-yard touchdown run by Jonathan Beasley, giving KSU a 7–3 lead. John Anderson kicked his second field goal of the game, a 49 yarder, making it 7–6 Kansas State.

In the second quarter, Kansas State's Jamie Rheem kicked a 41-yard field goal, increasing Kansas State's lead to 10–6. Washington later scored on a 3-yard touchdown run by Pat Coniff, giving Washington a 13–10 halftime lead.

In the third quarter, Jonathan Beasley scored his second touchdown of the game with an 11-yard run, to put Kansas State back on top 17–13. Washington reclaimed the lead after Maurice Shaw took a handoff, and ran 5 yards for a touchdown, 20–17. In the fourth quarter, Jonathan Beasley scored his third rushing touchdown of the game, giving Kansas State the lead for good at 24–20.
