= 1999 Oklahoma State Cowboys football team =

American college football season

1999 Oklahoma State Cowboys football
- Conference: Big 12 Conference
- South Division
- Record: 5–6 (3–5 Big 12)
- Head coach: Bob Simmons (5th season)
- Offensive coordinator: Ron Calcagni (2nd season)
- Defensive coordinator: Rob Ryan (3rd season)
- Home stadium: Lewis Field

1999 Big 12 Conference football standings
	Conf.			Overall
Team	W		L	W		L
North Division
No. 3 Nebraska xy$	7	–	1	12	–	1
No. 6 Kansas State x	7	–	1	11	–	1
Colorado	5	–	3	7	–	5
Kansas	3	–	5	5	–	7
Iowa State	1	–	7	4	–	7
Missouri	1	–	7	4	–	7
South Division
No. 21 Texas xy	6	–	2	9	–	5
Oklahoma	5	–	3	7	–	5
Texas Tech	5	–	3	6	–	5
No. 23 Texas A&M	5	–	3	8	–	4
Oklahoma State	3	–	5	5	–	6
Baylor	0	–	8	1	–	10
Championship: Nebraska 22, Texas 6
$ – BCS representative as conference champion; x – Division champion/co-champions; y – Championship game participant; Rankings from AP Poll

The 1999 Oklahoma State Cowboys football team represented Oklahoma State University as a member of the Big 12 Conference during the 1999 NCAA Division I-A football season. Led by fifth-year head coach Bob Simmons, the Cowboys compiled an overall record of 5–6 with a mark of 3–5 in conference play, placing fifth in the Big 12's South Division. Oklahoma State played home games at Lewis Field in Stillwater, Oklahoma.

== Schedule ==
Date	Time	Opponent	Site	TV	Result	Attendance	Source
September 4	7:00 p.m.	Louisiana-Lafayette*	Lewis Field; Stillwater, OK		W 24–7	36,028	
September 11	11:30 a.m.	Tulsa*	Lewis Field; Stillwater, OK (rivalry)	FSN	W 46–9	46,250	
September 18	2:30 p.m.	at Mississippi State*	Scott Field; Starkville, MS	JPS	L 11–29	38,193	
October 2	11:30 a.m.	at No. 6 Nebraska	Memorial Stadium; Lincoln, NE	FSN	L 14–38	77,740	
October 9	7:00 p.m.	Texas Tech	Lewis Field; Stillwater, OK		W 41–21	44,125	
October 23	11:30 a.m.	No. 7 Kansas State^{†}	Lewis Field; Stillwater, OK	FSN	L 21–44	48,500	
October 30	2:30 p.m.	at No. 22 Texas A&M	Kyle Field; College Station, TX		L 3–21	74,008	
November 6	1:30 p.m.	No. 11 Texas	Lewis Field; Stillwater, OK		L 21–34	44,025	
November 13	1:30 p.m.	Kansas	Lewis Field; Stillwater, OK		W 45–13	39,562	
November 20	1:00 p.m.	at Baylor	Floyd Casey Stadium; Waco, TX		W 34–14	18,673	
November 27	2:00 p.m.	at Oklahoma	Oklahoma Memorial Stadium; Norman, OK (Bedlam Series)	FSN	L 7–44	75,374	
*Non-conference game; ^{†}Homecoming; Rankings from AP Poll released prior to the game; All times are in Central time

== Roster ==
1999 Oklahoma State Cowboys football team roster
Players
Coaches
Offense

Pos.	#	Name	Class

Defense

Pos.	#	Name	Class
LB	7	Kenyatta Wright	Sr
DB	9	Jacoby Shepherd	Jr

Special teams

Pos.	#	Name	Class

Head coach

- Bob Simmons

Coordinators/assistant coaches

Legend

- (C) Team captain
- (S) Suspended
- (I) Ineligible
- Injured
- Redshirt

Roster
