= 1999 Kansas State Wildcats football team =

American college football season

1999 Kansas State Wildcats football

Big 12 North co-champion Holiday Bowl champion

Holiday Bowl, W 24–20 vs. Washington
- Conference: Big 12 Conference
- North Division

Ranking
- Coaches: No. 6
- AP: No. 6
- Record: 11–1 (7–1 Big 12)
- Head coach: Bill Snyder (11th season)
- Offensive coordinator: Ron Hudson (3rd season)
- Offensive scheme: Pro-style
- Defensive coordinator: Phil Bennett (1st season)
- Base defense: 4–3
- Home stadium: KSU Stadium

1999 Big 12 Conference football standings
| | Conf. | | | Overall |
| Team | W | | L | W | | L |
|---|---|---|---|---|---|---|
North Division
| No. 3 Nebraska xy$ | 7 | – | 1 | 12 | – | 1 |
| No. 6 Kansas State x | 7 | – | 1 | 11 | – | 1 |
| Colorado | 5 | – | 3 | 7 | – | 5 |
| Kansas | 3 | – | 5 | 5 | – | 7 |
| Iowa State | 1 | – | 7 | 4 | – | 7 |
| Missouri | 1 | – | 7 | 4 | – | 7 |
South Division
| No. 21 Texas xy | 6 | – | 2 | 9 | – | 5 |
| Oklahoma | 5 | – | 3 | 7 | – | 5 |
| Texas Tech | 5 | – | 3 | 6 | – | 5 |
| No. 23 Texas A&M | 5 | – | 3 | 8 | – | 4 |
| Oklahoma State | 3 | – | 5 | 5 | – | 6 |
| Baylor | 0 | – | 8 | 1 | – | 10 |
Championship: Nebraska 22, Texas 6
$ – BCS representative as conference champion; x – Division champion/co-champions; y – Championship game participant; Rankings from AP Poll

The 1999 Kansas State Wildcats football team represented Kansas State University as a member of the North Division of the Big 12 Conference during the 1999 NCAA Division I-A football season. Led by 11th-year head coach Bill Snyder, the Wildcats compiled an overall record of 11–1 with a mark of 7–1 in conference play, sharing Big 12's North Division title with Nebraska. Kansas State was invited to the Holiday Bowl, where the Wildcats defeated Washington.The team played home games at KSU Stadium in Manhattan, Kansas.

The Wildcats defense did not give up a score in the third quarter all season, and set a new program record for shutouts in a season with three. They shut out Temple, Utah State, and Missouri. Kansas State shutout Missouri three times in five games in Manhattan between 1991 and 1999. The Wildcats would later also shut out three opponents in 2002.

== Schedule ==
| Date | Time | Opponent | Rank | Site | TV | Result | Attendance |
|---|---|---|---|---|---|---|---|
| September 11 | 6:10 p.m. | Temple* | No. 17 | KSU Stadium; Manhattan, KS | | W 40–0 | 50,624 |
| September 18 | 6:10 p.m. | UTEP* | No. 16 | KSU Stadium; Manhattan, KS | | W 40–7 | 50,923 |
| September 25 | 11:30 a.m. | at Iowa State | No. 15 | Jack Trice Stadium; Ames, IA (rivalry) | FSN | W 35–28 | 40,057 |
| October 2 | 2:30 p.m. | at No. 15 Texas | No. 13 | Darrell K Royal–Texas Memorial Stadium; Austin, TX | ABC | W 35–17 | 83,082 |
| October 9 | 1:10 p.m. | Kansas | No. 9 | KSU Stadium; Manhattan, KS (rivalry) | | W 50–9 | 52,254 |
| October 16 | 1:10 p.m. | Utah State* | No. 9 | KSU Stadium; Manhattan, KS | | W 40–0 | 51,106 |
| October 23 | 11:30 a.m. | at Oklahoma State | No. 7 | Lewis Field; Stillwater, OK | FSN | W 44–21 | 48,500 |
| October 30 | 1:10 p.m. | Baylor^{†} | No. 6 | KSU Stadium; Manhattan, KS | | W 48–7 | 49,732 |
| November 6 | 11:30 a.m. | Colorado | No. 6 | KSU Stadium; Manhattan, KS (rivalry) | FSN | W 20–14 | 52,077 |
| November 13 | 2:30 p.m. | at No. 7 Nebraska | No. 5 | Memorial Stadium; Lincoln, NE (rivalry) | ABC | L 15–41 | 77,744 |
| November 20 | 1:10 p.m. | Missouri | No. 9 | KSU Stadium; Manhattan, KS | FSN | W 66–0 | 51,234 |
| December 29 | 7:00 p.m. | vs. Washington* | No. 7 | Qualcomm Stadium; San Diego, CA (Holiday Bowl) | ESPN | W 24–20 | 57,118 |
*Non-conference game; ^{†}Homecoming; Rankings from AP Poll released prior to the game; All times are in Central time

== Rankings ==
Ranking movements Legend: ██ Increase in ranking ██ Decrease in ranking т = Tied with team above or below
| | Week | | | | | | | | | | | | | | | | |
| Poll | Pre | 1 | 2 | 3 | 4 | 5 | 6 | 7 | 8 | 9 | 10 | 11 | 12 | 13 | 14 | 15 | Final |
|---|---|---|---|---|---|---|---|---|---|---|---|---|---|---|---|---|---|
| AP | 20T | 19 | 17 | 16 | 15 | 13 | 9 | 9 | 7 | 6 | 6 | 5 | 9 | 9 | 8 | 7 | 6 |
| Coaches | 19 | 19* | 18 | 16 | 15 | 13 | 10 | 8 | 7 | 6 | 6 | 5 | 9 | 8 | 7 | 7 | 6 |
| BCS | Not released | | | | | | | | | 5 | 6 | 5 | 8 | 6 | 6 | 6 | Not released |

== Game summaries ==
=== At Texas ===
Kansas State at Texas

| Team | 1 | 2 | 3 | 4 | Total |
|---|---|---|---|---|---|
| • Kansas State | 6 | 3 | 9 | 17 | 35 |
| Texas | 7 | 7 | 0 | 3 | 17 |

- Date: October 2
- Location: Darrell K Royal–Texas Memorial Stadium, Austin, Texas
- Game start: 2:30 p.m. CDT
- Game attendance: 83,082
- TV announcers (ABC): Brent Musburger, Bob Griese, & Jack Arute
- Source: box score

K-State won its first ever Big 12 trip to Austin, and first since 1942 (a 64–0 loss). They beat Texas soundly 48–7 in Manhattan in the 1998 campaign. David Allen returned a 74-yard punt for an NCAA record-tying touchdown and also scored a running touchdown as Texas turned the ball over a whopping six times. Kicker Jamie Rheem set a new school record with five field goals from 22, 23, 32, 27, and 20 yards. Linebacker Mark Simoneau scored on a pick six with 8:31 left in the fourth quarter extend the Wildcats' lead to 24–17. Jonathan Beasley who was removed from the game in the previous week's 35–28 victory over Iowa State relieved a struggling starting quarterback Adam Helm in the second quarter.

First quarter
KSU - Rheem 22 FG (3–0)
KSU - Rheem 23 FG (6–0)
UT - Smith 14 pass from Applewhite (Stockton kick) (6–7)

Second quarter
UT - Robertson 1 run (Stockton kick) (6–14)
KSU - Rheem 32 FG (9–14)

Third quarter
KSU - Allen 74-yard punt return (Gramatica kick) (15–14)
KSU - Rheem 27 FG (18–14)

Fourth quarter
UT - Stockton 25 FG (18–17)
KSU - Simoneau 37 interception return (Rheem kick) (25–17)
KSU - Allen 35 run (32–17) (Gramatica kick)
KSU - Rheem 20 FG (35–17)

=== Utah State ===
K-State running back Joe Hall ran for 195 yards on 25 carries with two touchdowns. Wildcat quarterback Jonathan Beasley was 9-29 passing and threw for 163 yards, 1 touchdown and two interceptions. Jaime Rheem kicked added four field goals. The Wildcats had 25 first downs, compared to the Aggies 8. K-State ran the ball for 277 yards, compared to Utah State's abysmal total of -7 yards on 18 carries. K-State beat an unranked opponent at home for the 48th straight time.

Utah State at Kansas State

| Team | 1 | 2 | 3 | 4 | Total |
|---|---|---|---|---|---|
| Utah State | 0 | 0 | 0 | 0 | 0 |
| • Kansas State | 9 | 3 | 7 | 21 | 40 |

- Date: October 16
- Location: KSU Stadium, Manhattan, Kansas
- Game start: 1:10 p.m. CST
- Game attendance: 51,106
- Television network: None
- Source: box score

=== At Nebraska ===
Kansas State at Nebraska

| Team | 1 | 2 | 3 | 4 | Total |
|---|---|---|---|---|---|
| Kansas State | 0 | 9 | 0 | 6 | 15 |
| • Nebraska | 16 | 8 | 0 | 17 | 41 |

- Date: November 13
- Location: Memorial Stadium, Lincoln, Nebraska
- Game start: 2:30 p.m. CST
- Game attendance: 77,744
- TV announcers (ABC): Brad Nessler, Bob Griese, & Lynn Swann

== Roster ==
1999 Kansas State Wildcats football team roster
Players
Coaches
Offense

| Pos. | # | Name | Class |
|---|---|---|---|
| RB | 32 | David Allen | Jr |
| QB | 18 | Jonathan Beasley | Jr |
| OT | 63 | Ryan Cummings | Jr |
| OL | 64 | Andy Eby | So |
| QB | 19 | Alam Helm | Sr |
| WR | 22 | Aaron Lockett | So |
| OT | 77 | Damion McIntosh | Sr |
| TE | 85 | Shad Meier | Jr |
| WR | 5 | Quincy Morgan | Jr |
| RB | 3 | Frank Murphy | Sr |

Defense

| Pos. | # | Name | Class |
|---|---|---|---|
| DE | 44 | Monty Beisel | Jr |
| CB | 23 | Jerametrius Butler | So |
| DB | 35 | Dyshod Carter | Jr |
| FS | 1 | Lamar Chapman | Sr |
| SS | 40 | Jarrod Cooper | Jr |
| DT | 75 | Mario Fatafehi | Jr |
| DE | 49 | Darren Howard | Sr |
| LB | 52 | Ben Leber | So |
| FS | 38 | Jon McGraw | So |
| CB | 4 | Terence Newman | Fr |
| LB | 42 | Mark Simoneau | Sr |

Special teams

| Pos. | # | Name | Class |
|---|---|---|---|
| K | 20 | Mike Goodnow | Sr |

Head coach

- Bill Snyder

Coordinators/assistant coaches

- Ron Hudson – Offensive Coordinator & quarterbacks
- Michael Smith – Running backs
- Greg Peterson – Wide receivers & passing game coordinator
- Matt Miller – Tight ends
- Paul Dunn – Offensive line
- Phil Bennett – Defensive Coordinator
- Mo Latimore – interior Defensive line
- Bob Fello – Defensive end & Special Teams Coordinator
- Jim Gush – Linebackers
- Rex Ryan – Defensive Coordinator (Never coached, left before start of season to coach defensive line for Baltimore Ravens)

Legend

- (C) Team captain
- (S) Suspended
- (I) Ineligible
- Injured
- Redshirt

Roster

== Statistics ==
=== Team ===
| | KSU | Opp |
|---|---|---|
| Scoring | 433 | 144 |
| Points per game | 39.4 | 13.1 |
| First downs | 203 | 143 |
| Rushing | 108 | 68 |
| Passing | 79 | 55 |
| Penalty | 16 | 20 |
| Total offense | 4,122 | 2,585 |
| Avg per play | 5.3 | 3.7 |
| Avg per game | 374.7 | 235.0 |
| Fumbles-Lost | 24-12 | 34–17 |
| Penalties-Yards | 101-860 | 76-542 |
| Avg per game | 78.2 | 49.3 |

| | KSU | Opp |
|---|---|---|
| Punts-Yards | 58–2,073 | 86–3,099 |
| Avg per punt | 35.7 | 36.0 |
| Time of possession/Game | 33:44 | 26:16 |
| 3rd down conversions | 49/157 | 35/157 |
| 4th down conversions | 10/16 | 3/12 |
| Touchdowns scored | 54 | 19 |
| Field goals-Attempts | 19-24 | 3–10 |
| PAT-Attempts | 48-50 | 17-17 |
| Attendance | 357,951 | 249,383 |
| Games/Avg per Game | 7/51,136 | 4/62,346 |

==== Scores by quarter ====
| | 1 | 2 | 3 | 4 | Total |
|---|---|---|---|---|---|
| Kansas State | 105 | 120 | 108 | 100 | 433 |
| Opponents | 54 | 49 | 0 | 41 | 144 |

=== Offense ===
==== Rushing ====
| Name | GP | Att | Gain | Loss | Net | Avg | TD | Long | Avg/G |
|---|---|---|---|---|---|---|---|---|---|
| Joe Hall | 9 | 121 | 628 | 15 | 613 | 5.1 | 6 | 47 | 68.1 |
| Frank Murphy | 7 | 97 | 569 | 28 | 541 | 5.6 | 6 | 46 | 77.3 |
| David Allen | 10 | 74 | 371 | 7 | 364 | 4.9 | 6 | 44 | 36.4 |
| Total | 11 | 526 | 2365 | 333 | 2032 | 3.9 | 31 | 47 | 184.7 |
| Opponents | 11 | 378 | 1571 | 350 | 1221 | 3.2 | 13 | 46 | 111.0 |

==== Passing ====
| Name | GP-GS | Effic | Att-Cmp-Int | Yds | TD | Lng | Avg/G | Pct. |
|---|---|---|---|---|---|---|---|---|
| Jonathan Beasley | 11-11 | 134.89 | 203-90-72 | 1,805 | 14 | 88 | 164.1 | 44.3 |
| Total | 11-11 | 124.91 | 256-116-9 | 2,090 | 14 | 88 | 190.0 | 45.3 |
| Opponents | 11 | 65.74 | 315-118-21 | 1,364 | 5 | 70 | 124.0 | 37.5 |

==== Receiving ====
| Name | GP | No. | Yds | Avg | TD | Long | Avg/G |
|---|---|---|---|---|---|---|---|
| Quincy Morgan | 11 | 42 | 1007 | 24.0 | 9 | 88 | 91.5 |
| Aaron Lockett | 11 | 33 | 531 | 16.1 | 3 | 43 | 48.3 |
| Frank Murphy | 7 | 6 | 39 | 6.5 | 0 | 13 | 5.6 |
| David Allen | 10 | 4 | 40 | 10.0 | 1 | 14 | 4.0 |
| Total | 11 | 116 | 2,090 | 18.0 | 14 | 88 | 190.0 |
| Opponents | 11 | 118 | 1,364 | 11.6 | 5 | 70 | 124.0 |
