= 1999 Texas Longhorns football team =

American college football season

1999 Texas Longhorns football

Big 12 South champion

Big 12 Football Championship Game, L 6–22 vs. Nebraska

Cotton Bowl Classic, L 6–27 vs. Arkansas
- Conference: Big 12 Conference
- South Division

Ranking
- Coaches: No. 23
- AP: No. 21
- Record: 9–5 (6–2 Big 12)
- Head coach: Mack Brown (2nd season)
- Offensive coordinator: Greg Davis (2nd season)
- Defensive coordinator: Carl Reese (2nd season)
- Home stadium: Darrell K Royal–Texas Memorial Stadium

1999 Big 12 Conference football standings
	Conf.			Overall
Team	W		L	W		L
North Division
No. 3 Nebraska xy$	7	–	1	12	–	1
No. 6 Kansas State x	7	–	1	11	–	1
Colorado	5	–	3	7	–	5
Kansas	3	–	5	5	–	7
Iowa State	1	–	7	4	–	7
Missouri	1	–	7	4	–	7
South Division
No. 21 Texas xy	6	–	2	9	–	5
Oklahoma	5	–	3	7	–	5
Texas Tech	5	–	3	6	–	5
No. 23 Texas A&M	5	–	3	8	–	4
Oklahoma State	3	–	5	5	–	6
Baylor	0	–	8	1	–	10
Championship: Nebraska 22, Texas 6
$ – BCS representative as conference champion; x – Division champion/co-champions; y – Championship game participant; Rankings from AP Poll

The 1999 Texas Longhorns football team represented the University of Texas at Austin as a member South Division of the Big 12 Conference during the 1999 NCAA Division I-A football season. Led by second-year head coach Mack Brown, the Longhorns compiled an overall record of 9–5 with a mark of 6–2 in conference play, winning the Big 12's South Division title. Texas advanced to the Big 12 Football Championship Game, where the Longhorns lost to Nebraska. Texas was then invited to the Cotton Bowl Classic, losing there to Arkansas. The team played home games at Darrell K Royal–Texas Memorial Stadium in Austin, Texas.

== Schedule ==
Date	Time	Opponent	Rank	Site	TV	Result	Attendance	Source
August 28	7:30 p.m.	NC State*	No. 17	Darrell K Royal–Texas Memorial Stadium; Austin, TX (BCA Classic)	ESPN2	L 20–23	82,252	
September 4	11:00 a.m.	Stanford*		Darrell K Royal–Texas Memorial Stadium; Austin, TX	ABC	W 69–17	80,654	
September 11	7:00 p.m.	at Rutgers*		Rutgers Stadium; Piscataway, NJ	ESPN2	W 38–21	41,511	
September 18	6:00 p.m.	Rice*		Darrell K Royal–Texas Memorial Stadium; Austin, TX (rivalry)	PPV	W 18–13	82,084	
September 25	6:00 p.m.	at Baylor	No. 22	Floyd Casey Stadium; Waco, TX (rivalry)		W 62–0	41,784	
October 2	2:30 p.m.	No. 12 Kansas State	No. 15	Darrell K Royal–Texas Memorial Stadium; Austin, TX	ABC	L 17–35	83,082	
October 9	2:30 p.m.	vs. Oklahoma	No. 23	Cotton Bowl; Dallas, TX (Red River Shootout)	ABC	W 38–28	75,587	
October 23	2:30 p.m.	No. 3 Nebraska	No. 18	Darrell K Royal–Texas Memorial Stadium; Austin, TX (College GameDay)	ABC	W 24–20	84,082	
October 30	11:30 .m.	at Iowa State	No. 12	Jack Trice Stadium; Ames, IA	FSN	W 44–41	37,218	
November 6	1:30 p.m.	at Oklahoma State	No. 11	Lewis Field; Stillwater, OK		W 34–21	44,025	
November 13	6:00 p.m.	Texas Tech	No. 10	Darrell K Royal–Texas Memorial Stadium; Austin, TX (rivalry)	FSN	W 58–7	83,882	
November 26	10:00 a.m.	at No. 24 Texas A&M	No. 7	Kyle Field; College Station, TX (rivalry)	ABC	L 16–20	86,128	
December 4	7:00 p.m.	vs. No. 3 Nebraska	No. 12	Alamodome; San Antonio, TX (Big 12 Championship Game)	ABC	L 6–22	65,035	
January 1, 2000	10:00 a.m.	vs. No. 24 Arkansas*	No. 14	Cotton Bowl; Dallas, TX (Cotton Bowl Classic, rivalry)	FOX	L 6–27	72,723	
*Non-conference game; Rankings from AP Poll released prior to the game; All times are in Central time

== Rankings ==
Ranking movements Legend: ██ Increase in ranking ██ Decrease in ranking — = Not ranked
	Week																
Poll	Pre	1	2	3	4	5	6	7	8	9	10	11	12	13	14	15	Final
AP	17	—	—	—	22	15	23	19	18	12	11	10	6	7	12	14	21
Coaches Poll	16	16*	23	22	20	15	23	19	18	12	11	10	6	5	12	18	23
BCS	Not released									10	11	11	9	9	11	15	Not released

== Game summaries ==
=== NC State ===
NC State at Texas

Team	1	2	Total
NC State			0
Texas			0

- Date: August 28
- TV announcers (ABC): Ron Franklin, Mike Gottfried, & Adrian Karsten

=== Kansas State ===
Kansas State at Texas

Team	1	2	3	4	Total
• Kansas State	6	3	9	17	35
Texas	7	7	0	3	17

- Date: October 2
- Location: Darrell K Royal–Texas Memorial Stadium, Austin, Texas
- Game start: 3:30 CDT
- Game attendance: 83,082
- TV announcers (ABC): Brent Musburger, Bob Griese, & Jack Arute
- Source: Box Score

=== Nebraska ===
Nebraska at Texas

Team	1	2	3	4	Total
Nebraska	0	13	0	7	20
• Texas	3	0	14	7	24

- Date: October 23
- Location: Darrell K Royal–Texas Memorial Stadium, Austin, Texas
- Game start: 3:30 CDT
- Game attendance: 84,082
- TV announcers (ABC): Brent Musburger, Gary Danielson, & Jack Arute
- Source: Box Score

=== Texas Tech ===
Texas Tech at Texas

Team	1	2	3	4	Total
Texas Tech	0	0	0	7	7
• Texas	7	14	17	20	58

- Date: November 13
- Location: Darrell K Royal–Texas Memorial Stadium, Austin, Texas
- Game start: 7:00
- Game attendance: 83,882
- TV announcers (FSN): Ron Thulin, Artie Gigantino, & Eric Clemons

Scoring summary
1	TEX	Flowers 25 yard pass from Applewhite (K. Stockton kick)	Texas 7–0
2	TEX	Jackson 22 yard interception return (K. Stockton kick)	Texas 14–0
2	TEX	Cavil 2 yard pass from Applewhite (K. Stockton kick)	Texas 21–0
3	TEX	K. Stockton 35 yard field goal	Texas 24–0
3	TEX	Ch. Robertson 1 yard run (K. Stockton kick)	Texas 31–0
3	TEX	Mitchell 11 yard run (K. Stockton kick)	Texas 38–0
4	TEX	Flowers 36 yard pass from Applewhite (kick failed)	Texas 44–0
4	TTU	Morris 13 yard run (Birkholz kick)	Texas 44–7
4	TEX	Ike 1 yard run (K. Stockton kick)	Texas 51–7
4	TEX	K. Hayter 10 yard run (J. Baker kick)	Texas 58–7

=== At Texas A&M ===
Texas A&M at Texas

Team	1	2	Total
Texas A&M			0
Texas			0

- Date: November 26
- Game start: 11:00 CDT
- TV announcers (ABC): Tim Brant, Dean Blevins, & Chip Tarkenton

This rivalry game would unite the two schools for the year, due to the tragic collapse of Texas A&M's bonfire the week prior to the game. A sellout crowd was met with an awe-inspiring halftime performance from both schools.

== Roster ==
1999 Texas Longhorns football team roster
Players
Coaches
Offense

Pos.	#	Name	Class
QB	2	Chris Simms	Fr
QB	11	Major Applewhite	So
WR	9	Kwame Cavil	Jr
RB	37	Chris Robertson	So
LT	70	Leonard Davis	Jr

Defense

Pos.	#	Name	Class
DE	40	Cory Redding	Fr

Special teams

Pos.	#	Name	Class

Head coach

- Mack Brown

Coordinators/assistant coaches

Legend

- (C) Team captain
- (S) Suspended
- (I) Ineligible
- Injured
- Redshirt
