= 1999 Kansas Jayhawks football team =

American college football season

1999 Kansas Jayhawks football
- Conference: Big 12 Conference
- North Division
- Record: 5–7 (3–5 Big 12)
- Head coach: Terry Allen (3rd season)
- Offensive coordinator: Bill Salmon (3rd season)
- Defensive coordinator: Ardell Wiegandt (3rd season)
- Home stadium: Memorial Stadium

1999 Big 12 Conference football standings
	Conf.			Overall
Team	W		L	W		L
North Division
No. 3 Nebraska xy$	7	–	1	12	–	1
No. 6 Kansas State x	7	–	1	11	–	1
Colorado	5	–	3	7	–	5
Kansas	3	–	5	5	–	7
Iowa State	1	–	7	4	–	7
Missouri	1	–	7	4	–	7
South Division
No. 21 Texas xy	6	–	2	9	–	5
Oklahoma	5	–	3	7	–	5
Texas Tech	5	–	3	6	–	5
No. 23 Texas A&M	5	–	3	8	–	4
Oklahoma State	3	–	5	5	–	6
Baylor	0	–	8	1	–	10
Championship: Nebraska 22, Texas 6
$ – BCS representative as conference champion; x – Division champion/co-champions; y – Championship game participant; Rankings from AP Poll

The 1999 Kansas Jayhawks football team represented the University of Kansas as a member of the North Division of the Big 12 Conference during the 1999 NCAA Division I-A football season. Led by third-year head coach Terry Allen, the Jayhawks compiled an overall record of 5–7 with a mark of 3–5 in conference play, placing fourth in the Big 12's North Division. The team played home games at Memorial Stadium in Lawrence, Kansas.

== Schedule ==
Date	Time	Opponent	Site	TV	Result	Attendance
August 28	2:30 p.m.	at No. 18 Notre Dame*	Notre Dame Stadium; Notre Dame, IN (Eddie Robinson Classic)	NBC	L 13–48	80,012
September 8	6:00 p.m.	Cal State Northridge*	Memorial Stadium; Lawrence, KS		W 71–14	33,300
September 18	2:30 p.m.	at Colorado	Folsom Field; Boulder, CO	ABC	L 17–51	47,783
September 25	6:00 p.m.	San Diego State*	Memorial Stadium; Lawrence, KS		L 13–41	34,500
October 2	1:00 p.m.	SMU*^{†}	Memorial Stadium; Lawrence, KS		W 27–9	24,700
October 9	1:10 p.m.	at No. 9 Kansas State	KSU Stadium; Manhattan, KS (Sunflower Showdown)		L 9–50	52,254
October 16	11:30 a.m.	at No. 13 Texas A&M	Kyle Field; College Station, TX	FSN	L 17–34	70,232
October 23	1:00 p.m.	Missouri	Memorial Stadium; Lawrence, KS (Border War)		W 21–0	42,300
October 30	6:00 p.m.	No. 8 Nebraska	Memorial Stadium; Lawrence, KS (rivalry)	FSN	L 17–24	45,100
November 6	1:00 p.m.	Baylor	Memorial Stadium; Lawrence, KS		W 45–10	28,600
November 13	1:30 p.m.	at Oklahoma State	Lewis Field; Stillwater, OK		L 13–45	39,562
November 20	1:00 p.m.	Iowa State	Memorial Stadium; Lawrence, KS		W 31–28	27,000
*Non-conference game; ^{†}Homecoming; Rankings from AP Poll released prior to the game; All times are in Central time

== Roster ==
1999 Kansas Jayhawks football team roster
Players
Coaches
Offense

Pos.	#	Name	Class
WR	1	Harrison Hill	So
QB	9	Jake Letourneau	Fr
QB	10	Jonas Weatherbie	Fr
QB	13	Zach Dyer	Fr
QB	14	Zac Wegner	Sr
RB	33	Moran Norris	Jr
C	68	Chris Enneking	Sr
OT	75	Justin Hartwig	So
TE	85	Sean McDermott	Sr

Defense

Pos.	#	Name	Class
DB	24	Andrew Davison	So

Special teams

Pos.	#	Name	Class
LB	58	Anthony Buckland	Fr

Head coach

- Terry Allen

Coordinators/assistant coaches

- Bill Salmon (Offensive coordinator)
- Ardell Wiegandt (Defensive coordinator)
- Jay Johnson (Quarterbacks coach)

Legend

- (C) Team captain
- (S) Suspended
- (I) Ineligible
- Injured
- Redshirt

Roster
Last update: 1999-10-13
