= 1999 Iowa State Cyclones football team =

American college football season

1999 Iowa State Cyclones football
- Conference: Big 12 Conference
- North Division
- Record: 4–7 (1–7 Big 12)
- Head coach: Dan McCarney (5th season)
- Offensive coordinator: Pete Hoener (2nd season)
- Offensive scheme: Pro-style
- Defensive coordinator: John Skladany (3rd season)
- Base defense: 4–3
- Home stadium: Jack Trice Stadium

1999 Big 12 Conference football standings
	Conf.			Overall
Team	W		L	W		L
North Division
No. 3 Nebraska xy$	7	–	1	12	–	1
No. 6 Kansas State x	7	–	1	11	–	1
Colorado	5	–	3	7	–	5
Kansas	3	–	5	5	–	7
Iowa State	1	–	7	4	–	7
Missouri	1	–	7	4	–	7
South Division
No. 21 Texas xy	6	–	2	9	–	5
Oklahoma	5	–	3	7	–	5
Texas Tech	5	–	3	6	–	5
No. 23 Texas A&M	5	–	3	8	–	4
Oklahoma State	3	–	5	5	–	6
Baylor	0	–	8	1	–	10
Championship: Nebraska 22, Texas 6
$ – BCS representative as conference champion; x – Division champion/co-champions; y – Championship game participant; Rankings from AP Poll

The 1999 Iowa State Cyclones football team represented Iowa State University as a member of the North Division in the Big 12 Conference during the 1999 NCAA Division I-A football season. Led by fifth-year head coach Dan McCarney, the Cyclones compiled an overall record of 4–7 with a mark of 1–7 in conference play, tying for fifth place at the bottom Big 12 North Division standings. Iowa State played home games at Jack Trice Stadium in Ames, Iowa.

== Schedule ==
Date	Time	Opponent	Site	TV	Result	Attendance
September 2	7:00 p.m.	Indiana State*	Jack Trice Stadium; Ames, IA		W 33–7	33,936
September 11	6:00 p.m.	Iowa*	Jack Trice Stadium; Ames, IA (rivalry)	FSN	W 17–10	50,402
September 18	9:00 p.m.	at UNLV*	Sam Boyd Stadium; Whitney, NV		W 24–0	26,176
September 25	11:30 a.m.	No. 15 Kansas State	Jack Trice Stadium; Ames, IA (rivalry)	FSN	L 28–35	40,057
October 9	6:00 p.m.	at No. 4 Nebraska	Memorial Stadium; Lincoln, NE (rivalry)	FSN	L 14–42	77,743
October 16	6:00 p.m.	at Missouri	Faurot Field; Columbia, MO (rivalry)	FSN	W 24–21	61,052
October 23	1:00 p.m.	Colorado	Jack Trice Stadium; Ames, IA		L 12–16	34,892
October 30	11:30 a.m.	No. 12 Texas^{†}	Jack Trice Stadium; Ames, IA	FSN	L 41–44	37,218
November 6	1:00 p.m.	at Texas Tech	Jones Stadium; Lubbock, TX		L 16–28	41,691
November 13	1:00 p.m.	Oklahoma	Jack Trice Stadium; Ames, IA		L 10–31	37,073
November 20	1:00 p.m.	at Kansas	Memorial Stadium; Lawrence, KS		L 28–31	27,000
*Non-conference game; ^{†}Homecoming; Rankings from AP Poll released prior to the game; All times are in Central time

== Roster ==
1999 Iowa State Cyclones football team roster
Players
Coaches
Offense

Pos.	#	Name	Class
TE	31	Mike Banks	So
WR	32	J. J. Moses	Jr
QB	18	Sage Rosenfels	Jr

Defense

Pos.	#	Name	Class
DE	15	Reggie Hayward	Jr
DT	52	James Reed	Jr
LB	45	Joe Woodley	Fr

Special teams

Pos.	#	Name	Class

Head coach

- Dan McCarney

Coordinators/assistant coaches

Legend

- (C) Team captain
- (S) Suspended
- (I) Ineligible
- Injured
- Redshirt
