= 1999 Colorado Buffaloes football team =

American college football season

1999 Colorado Buffaloes football

Insight.com Bowl champion

Insight.com Bowl, W 62–28 vs. Boston College
- Conference: Big 12 Conference
- North Division
- Record: 7–5 (5–3 Big 12)
- Head coach: Gary Barnett (1st season)
- Offensive coordinator: Tom Cable (1st season)
- Offensive scheme: Multiple
- Co-defensive coordinators: Tom McMahon (1st season); Vince Okruch (1st season)
- Base defense: Multiple 4–3
- MVP: Jashon Sykes
- Captains: Ryan Johanningmeier; Ben Kelly; Mike Moschetti
- Home stadium: Folsom Field

1999 Big 12 Conference football standings
	Conf.			Overall
Team	W		L	W		L
North Division
No. 3 Nebraska xy$	7	–	1	12	–	1
No. 6 Kansas State x	7	–	1	11	–	1
Colorado	5	–	3	7	–	5
Kansas	3	–	5	5	–	7
Iowa State	1	–	7	4	–	7
Missouri	1	–	7	4	–	7
South Division
No. 21 Texas xy	6	–	2	9	–	5
Oklahoma	5	–	3	7	–	5
Texas Tech	5	–	3	6	–	5
No. 23 Texas A&M	5	–	3	8	–	4
Oklahoma State	3	–	5	5	–	6
Baylor	0	–	8	1	–	10
Championship: Nebraska 22, Texas 6
$ – BCS representative as conference champion; x – Division champion/co-champions; y – Championship game participant; Rankings from AP Poll

The 1999 Colorado Buffaloes football team represented the University of Colorado at Boulder as a member of the North Division of the Big 12 Conference during the 1999 NCAA Division I FBS football season. Led by first-year head coach Gary Barnett, the Buffaloes compiled an overall record of 7–5 in a mark of 5–3 in conference play, placing third in the Big 12 North. Colorado was invited to the Insight.com Bowl, where the Buffaloes defeated Boston College. The team played home games at Folsom Field in Boulder, Colorado.

== Schedule ==
Date	Time	Opponent	Rank	Site	TV	Result	Attendance
September 4	5:00 pm	vs. Colorado State*	No. 14	Mile High Stadium; Denver, CO (Rocky Mountain Showdown)	FX	L 14–41	73,438
September 11	1:30 pm	San Jose State*		Folsom Field; Boulder, CO		W 63–35	41,716
September 18	1:30 pm	Kansas^{†}		Folsom Field; Boulder, CO	ABC	W 51–17	47,783
September 25	1:30 pm	at Washington*		Husky Stadium; Seattle, WA	ABC	L 24–31	72,068
October 9	11:30 am	Missouri		Folsom Field; Boulder, CO	FSN	W 46–39 ^{OT}	48,674
October 16	1:30 pm	at Texas Tech		Jones Stadium; Lubbock, TX	ABC	L 10–31	46,424
October 23	12:00 pm	at Iowa State		Jack Trice Stadium; Ames, IA		W 16–12	34,892
October 30	1:30 pm	No. 24 Oklahoma		Folsom Field; Boulder, CO	ABC	W 38–24	48,194
November 6	10:30 am	at No. 6 Kansas State		KSU Stadium; Manhattan, KS (rivalry)	FSN	L 14–20	52,077
November 13	12:00 pm	at Baylor		Floyd Casey Stadium; Waco, TX		W 37–0	25,726
November 26	12:30 pm	No. 3 Nebraska		Folsom Field; Boulder, CO (rivalry)	ABC	L 30–33 ^{OT}	52,946
December 31	11:30 am	vs. No. 25 Boston College*		Arizona Stadium; Tucson, AZ (Insight.com Bowl)	ESPN	W 62–28	35,762
*Non-conference game; ^{†}Homecoming; Rankings from AP Poll released prior to the game; All times are in Mountain time

== Rankings ==
Ranking movements Legend: ██ Increase in ranking ██ Decrease in ranking — = Not ranked
	Week																
Poll	Pre	1	2	3	4	5	6	7	8	9	10	11	12	13	14	15	Final
AP	15	14	—	—	—	—	—	—	—	—	—	—	—	—	—	—	—
Coaches Poll	17	17*	—	—	—	—	—	—	—	—	—	—	—	—	—	—	—
BCS	Not released									—	—	—	—	—	—	—	Not released

== Game summaries ==
=== San Jose State ===
San Jose State at Colorado

Team	1	2	3	4	Total
San Jose State	0	15	7	13	35
• Colorado	28	14	7	14	63

- Date: September 11
- Location: Folsom Field, Boulder, Colorado
- Game start: 1:30 MDT
- Game attendance: 41,716
- Source: ESPN

Scoring summary
1	COL	Moschetti 12-yard run (Aldrich kick)	COL 7-0
1	COL	Graham 23-yard pass from Moschetti (Aldrich kick)	COL 14-0
1	COL	C Johnson 1-yard run (Aldrich kick)	COL 21-0
1	COL	C Johnson 1-yard run (Aldrich kick)	COL 28-0
2	SJSU	Whitaker 8-yard run (Whitaker run for two-point conversion)	COL 28-8
2	COL	D Barton 3-yard run (Aldrich kick)	COL 35-8
2	SJSU	Whitaker 6-yard pass from Kasteler (T Morgan kick)	COL 35-15
2	COL	Stiggers 65-yard pass from Moschetti (Aldrich kick)	COL 42-15
3	COL	Cherrington 3-yard run (Aldrich kick)	COL 49-15
3	SJSU	Ruhle 28-yard pass from Kasteler (T Morgan kick)	COL 49-22
4	COL	C Johnson 11-yard run (Aldrich kick)	COL 56-22
4	COL	D Barton 15-yard run (Mariscal kick)	COL 63-22
4	SJSU	Pulley 21-yard pass from Crooks (two-point conversion failed)	COL 63-28
4	SJSU	K Nears 3-yard pass from Crooks (T Morgan kick)	COL 63-35

=== Oklahoma ===
Oklahoma at Colorado

Team	1	2	3	4	Total
Oklahoma	3	7	0	14	24
• Colorado	7	7	10	14	38

- Date: October 30
- Location: Folsom Field, Boulder, Colorado
- Game attendance: 48,194
- TV announcers (ABC): Brad Nessler, Lynn Swann, & Chip Tarkenton
- Source: USA Today

Scoring summary
1	OKLA	Duncan 27-yard field goal	OKLA 3-0
1	COL	Stiggers 14-yard pass from Moschetti (Aldrich kick)	COL 7-3
2	OKLA	Littrell recovered blocked punt in end zone (Duncan kick)	OKLA 10-7
2	COL	Green 49-yard pass from Moschetti (Aldrich kick)	COL 14-10
3	COL	Moschetti 1-yard run (Aldrich kick)	COL 21-10
3	COL	Aldrich 33-yard field goal	COL 24-10
4	OKLA	R. Skinner 6-yard pass from Heupel (Duncan kick)	COL 24-17
4	COL	Graham 14-yard pass from Moschetti (Aldrich kick)	COL 31-17
4	OKLA	J. Jackson 49-yard pass from Heupel (Duncan kick)	COL 31-24
4	COL	Green 88-yard pass from Moschetti (Aldrich kick)	COL 38-24

== Roster ==
1999 Colorado Buffaloes football team roster
Players
Coaches
Offense

Pos.	#	Name	Class
QB	4	Bobby Pesavento	So
WR	14	Cedric Cormier	So
G	62	Chris Morgan	Sr
G	65	Andre Gurode	So
G	76	Brad Bedell	Sr
WR	81	Jason Burianek	Fr
TE	89	Daniel Graham	So

Defense

Pos.	#	Name	Class
DB	3	Rashidi Barnes	Sr
CB	4	Donald Strickland	Fr
SS	31	Michael Lewis	So
DE	83	Brady McDonnell	Jr
DT	97	Justin Bannan	So

Special teams

Pos.	#	Name	Class

Head coach

- Gary Barnett

Coordinators/assistant coaches

Legend

- (C) Team captain
- (S) Suspended
- (I) Ineligible
- Injured
- Redshirt

Roster
Last update: 2018-04-16
