= 1999 Missouri Tigers football team =

American college football season

1999 Missouri Tigers football
- Conference: Big 12 Conference
- North Division
- Record: 4–7 (1–7 Big 12)
- Head coach: Larry Smith (6th season)
- Offensive coordinator: Jerry Berndt (6th season)
- Defensive coordinator: Moe Ankney (6th season)
- Home stadium: Faurot Field

1999 Big 12 Conference football standings
| | Conf. | | | Overall |
| Team | W | | L | W | | L |
|---|---|---|---|---|---|---|
North Division
| No. 3 Nebraska xy$ | 7 | – | 1 | 12 | – | 1 |
| No. 6 Kansas State x | 7 | – | 1 | 11 | – | 1 |
| Colorado | 5 | – | 3 | 7 | – | 5 |
| Kansas | 3 | – | 5 | 5 | – | 7 |
| Iowa State | 1 | – | 7 | 4 | – | 7 |
| Missouri | 1 | – | 7 | 4 | – | 7 |
South Division
| No. 21 Texas xy | 6 | – | 2 | 9 | – | 5 |
| Oklahoma | 5 | – | 3 | 7 | – | 5 |
| Texas Tech | 5 | – | 3 | 6 | – | 5 |
| No. 23 Texas A&M | 5 | – | 3 | 8 | – | 4 |
| Oklahoma State | 3 | – | 5 | 5 | – | 6 |
| Baylor | 0 | – | 8 | 1 | – | 10 |
Championship: Nebraska 22, Texas 6
$ – BCS representative as conference champion; x – Division champion/co-champions; y – Championship game participant; Rankings from AP Poll

The 1999 Missouri Tigers football team represented the University of Missouri during the 1999 NCAA Division I-A football season. They played their home games at Faurot Field in Columbia, Missouri. They were members of the Big 12 Conference in the North Division. The team was coached by head coach Larry Smith.

== Schedule ==
| Date | Time | Opponent | Site | TV | Result | Attendance | Source |
|---|---|---|---|---|---|---|---|
| September 4 | 2:30 pm | UAB* | Faurot Field; Columbia, MO | FSN | W 31–28 | 50,356 | |
| September 18 | 6:30 pm | Western Michigan* | Faurot Field; Columbia, MO | | W 48–34 | 60,206 | |
| September 25 | 6:00 pm | No. 5 Nebraska | Faurot Field; Columbia, MO (rivalry) | FSN | L 10–40 | 68,174 | |
| October 2 | 2:30 pm | at Memphis* | Liberty Bowl Memorial Stadium; Memphis, TN | FSN | W 27–17 | 29,248 | |
| October 9 | 12:30 pm | at Colorado | Folsom Field; Boulder, CO | FSN | L 39–46 ^{OT} | 48,674 | |
| October 17 | 6:00 pm | Iowa State^{†} | Faurot Field; Columbia, MO (rivalry) | FSN | L 21–24 | 61,052 | |
| October 23 | 1:00 pm | at Kansas | Memorial Stadium; Lawrence, KS (Border War) | | L 0–21 | 42,300 | |
| October 30 | 1:00 pm | Texas Tech | Faurot Field; Columbia, MO | | W 34–7 | 52,982 | |
| November 6 | 2:00 pm | at Oklahoma | Oklahoma Memorial Stadium; Norman, OK (rivalry) | | L 0–37 | 74,966 | |
| November 13 | 11:30 am | Texas A&M | Faurot Field; Columbia, MO | FSN | L 14–51 | 57,472 | |
| November 20 | 1:10 pm | at No. 9 Kansas State | KSU Stadium; Manhattan, KS | | L 0–66 | 51,235 | |
*Non-conference game; ^{†}Homecoming; Rankings from AP Poll released prior to the game; All times are in Central time

== Roster ==
1999 Missouri Tigers football team roster
Players
Coaches
Offense

| Pos. | # | Name | Class |
|---|---|---|---|
| RB | 2 | Zain Gilmore | So |
| QB | 3 | Darius Outlaw | Fr |
| QB | 7 | Ryan Jost | Fr |
| QB | 8 | Tim Nash | So |
| QB | 11 | Jim Dougherty | So |
| QB | 12 | Justin Gage | Fr |
| TB | 28 | Shan Schauffler | Fr |
| FB | 30 | Jordan Rouff | Fr |
| C | 69 | Scott Sells | Fr |
| OT | 70 | A. J. Ricker | Fr |
| OT | 71 | Joe Glauberman | Jr |
| OT | 72 | Justin Bland | So |
| OT | 73 | Brad Smith | Fr |
| OT | 74 | Aaron Crittendon | So |
| C | 76 | Rob Riti | Sr |
| WR | 80 | John Dausman | Jr |
| WR | 80 | Darren Baldwin | Fr |
| TE | 81 | Brandon Barnes | Fr |
| WR | 82 | Brandon Severino | Fr |
| WR | 84 | Kent Layman | Sr |
| WR | 84 | Matt Bloomquist | Fr |
| TE | 87 | Brandon Ford | So |
| TE | 88 | Jake Kling | Fr |
| TE | 89 | Matt Donnelly | Sr |

Defense

| Pos. | # | Name | Class |
|---|---|---|---|
| FS | 4 | Julian Jones | Jr |
| CB | 5 | Carlos Posey | Sr |
| CB | 7 | Antoine Duncan | Fr |
| S | 8 | Clarence Jones | So |
| SS | 22 | Marcus Caldwell | Fr |
| FS | 24 | Grant Thornburg | Fr |
| SS | 26 | Harold Hendricks | Jr |
| CB | 26 | Brian Thompson | Fr |
| LB | 39 | Barry Odom | Sr |
| LB | 50 | David Monroe | So |
| LB | 51 | Eric Earthly | So |
| LB | 52 | Steven Colbert | So |
| LB | 53 | Joe Weir | Fr |
| LB | 54 | Josh O'Neal | Fr |
| LB | 55 | Jamonte Robinson | So |
| LB | 56 | Duke Revard | So |
| DT | 58 | Cliff Young | Fr |
| DT | 90 | Cedric Harden | Fr |
| NT | 91 | Clayton McAboy | So |
| DE | 92 | Garrett Hill | So |
| NT | 93 | Jeff Marriott | Sr |
| DT | 94 | Steve Erickson | Sr |
| DE | 95 | Daryl Whittington | Jr |
| DE | 96 | Justin Smith | So |
| NT | 97 | Jemarcus Joshua | Fr |
| DT | 98 | Michael Gavins | So |
| LB | 99 | Michael Clay | Fr |

Special teams

| Pos. | # | Name | Class |
|---|---|---|---|
| K | 1 | Brad Hammerich | So |
| K | 6 | Brian Anselmo | Fr |
| K | 10 | Brian Long | So |
| P | 17 | Vince Sebo | Jr |
| K | 18 | Tim Geiger | Jr |
| K | 19 | Alexander St. Peter | So |

Head coach

- Larry Smith

Coordinators/assistant coaches

Legend

- (C) Team captain
- (S) Suspended
- (I) Ineligible
- Injured
- Redshirt

Roster

== Coaching staff ==
| Name | Position | Seasons at Missouri | Alma mater |
|---|---|---|---|
| Larry Smith | Head coach | 6 | Bowling Green (1961) |
| Jerry Berndt | Offensive coordinator & quarterbacks | 6 | Wisconsin–Superior (1960) |
| Corbyn Smith | Offensive tackle, tight end & Special teams coordinator | 2 | Iowa (1995) |
| David Mitchell | Running backs | 3 | Arkansas State |
| Andy Hill | Wide receivers | 4 | Missouri (1985) |
| Andy Moeller | Offensive line | 7 | Michigan (1986) |
| Moe Ankney | Defensive coordinator | 6 | Bowling Green (1963) |
| Dave Toub | Defensive line | 2 | UTEP (1985) |
| Ricky Hunley | Linebackers & associate head coach | 6 | Arizona (1984) |
| Brian Stewart | defensive backs | 1 | Northern Arizona (1988) |
