= Jarrail Jackson =

American football player and coach (born 1977)

Texas College Steers
- Title: Head coach

Personal information
- Born: September 30, 1977 (age 49); Houston, Texas, U.S.
- Listed height: 5 ft 11 in (1.80 m)
- Listed weight: 195 lb (88 kg)

Career information
- Position: Wide receiver
- High school: Yates (Houston, Texas)
- College: Oklahoma (1995–1999)
- NFL draft: 2000: undrafted

Career history

Playing
- Tulsa Talons (2000); Oklahoma Wranglers (2001)*; Tulsa Talons (2001); Buffalo / Columbus Destroyers (2002–2004); Austin Wranglers (2004–2005); Oklahoma City Yard Dawgz (2005–2006); Manchester Wolves (2007); Oklahoma City Yard Dawgz (2007); Tulsa Talons (2008); Oklahoma City Yard Dawgz (2009)
- * Offseason or practice squad member only

Coaching
- Chickasha HS (OK) (2004) Wide receivers coach; Central Oklahoma (2005) Volunteer assistant; Dartmouth (2006–2011) Wide receivers coach; Davidson (2015) Quarterbacks coach; Mississippi State (2016) Offensive assistant & recruiting assistant; Central Oklahoma (2017–2018) Wide receivers coach; Dallas Renegades (2019–2020) Wide receivers coach; Tyler (2020–2021) Offensive coordinator, quarterbacks coach, & wide receivers coach; Spokane Shock (2021) Wide receivers coach; Texas College (2022–present) Head coach

Operations
- Washington State (2012–2014) Director of player relations

Awards and highlights
- As player: Third–team All-Big 12 (1999); As coach: SAC Coach of the Year (2024); AFCA–NAIA Region 5 Coach of the Year (2024)

Head coaching record
- Career: 10–30 (.250)

Jarrail "J. J." Jackson (born September 30, 1977) is an American football coach. He is the head football coach for Texas College, a position he has held since 2022. He played college football as a wide receiver for Oklahoma. He played professionally in the af2 and Arena Football League (AFL) for the Tulsa Talons, Buffalo Destroyers, Austin Wranglers, Oklahoma City Yard Dawgz, and the Manchester Wolves.

== Early life and college career ==
Jackson was born on September 30, 1977, in Houston. He attended and played high school football for Yates High School under head coach Maurice McGowan. During Jackson's high school career, his team went 39–8–2 and won three conference championships. In 1995, he elected to play college football for Oklahoma as a wide receiver under head coach Howard Schnellenberger. Jackson redshirted in his true freshman season. During his redshirt freshman season, Jackson returned a punt for a touchdown during Oklahoma's upset win over No. 25 Texas. After playing under John Blake for three seasons, Jackson had his best season of production as a senior in 1999. Under head coach Bob Stoops offensive coordinator Mike Leach, he recorded 54 catches for 659 yards and seven touchdowns—which at the time was a school record—as the Sooners finished 7–5 and made their first bowl game since 1994 under Gary Gibbs. After the season he was named as a third team All-Big 12 player.

== Professional career ==
=== Tulsa Talons ===
After going undrafted in the 2000 NFL draft, Jackson signed with the Tulsa Talons of AF2 midway through the season. He signed with the Talons with hopes to eventually play in the National Football League (NFL). He recorded 27 catches for 413 yards and four touchdowns and also played defensive back where he intercepted six passes. He helped lead the team to a 9–7 record and a playoff appearance in the team's first season of existence.

=== Oklahoma Wranglers ===
In November 2000, Jackson signed with the Oklahoma Wranglers of the Arena Football League (AFL). He was released in March 2001 during final cuts.

=== Tulsa Talons (second stint) ===
In April 2001, Jackson resigned with the Tulsa Talons. He made an immediate impact with the team and helped lead them to a 13–3 record and a playoff appearance for the second-straight season despite suffering an ankle injury. He did not return after the season.

=== Buffalo / Columbus Destroyers ===
In 2002, Jackson signed with the Buffalo Destroyers of the AFL. He was placed on injured reserve and missed two regular season games due to a severe hamstring pull. In 2003, against the Las Vegas Gladiators, Jackson had a career-high 365 all-purpose yards and set a team record with 216 kick return yards.

=== Austin Wranglers ===
Halfway through the 2004 season, Jackson signed with the Austin Wranglers of the AFL. After initially not being retained, he resigned with the Wranglers in December 2004. He was released in February 2005.

=== Oklahoma City Yard Dawgz ===
In 2005, Jackson signed with the Oklahoma City Yard Dawgz of the AF2. During the season he set franchise records for receptions with 125, receiving yards with 1,636, receiving touchdowns, and all-purpose yards with 1,529. He set the records despite missing two games with a hamstring injury.

=== Manchester Wolves ===
In 2007, Jackson signed with the Manchester Wolves of the AF2. He played in ten games for the Wolves and recorded 1,199 all-purpose yards.

=== Oklahoma City Yard Dawgz (second stint) ===
In July 2007, Jackson returned for his second stint with the Oklahoma City Yard Dawgz of the AF2.

=== Tulsa Talons (third stint) ===
In 2008, Jackson returned to where he began his career with the Tulsa Talons of the AF2. He played in four games.

=== Oklahoma City Yard Dawgz (third stint) ===
In November 2008, Jackson returned for his third stint with the Oklahoma City Yard Dawgz of the AF2. He did not play a game for the Yard Dawgz. After the season, he was nominated for the AF2 Hall of Fame ballot. Following the season, Jackson retired as a player to focus solely on coaching.

== Coaching career ==
In 2004, Jackson began his coaching career as the wide receivers coach for Chickasha High School while playing for the Oklahoma City Yard Dawgz. He spent the 2005 season as a volunteer assistant for Central Oklahoma working with the wide receivers under Chuck Langston.

In 2006, Jackson was hired as the wide receivers coach for Dartmouth under Buddy Teevens while still playing for Oklahoma City. Despite being posed with a choice of playing or coaching, Jackson opted for both. He was able to balance playing and coaching due to the Manchester Wolves, who he played for during his second season with Dartmouth, practicing on Tuesday and Thursday while Dartmouth tended to practice on a Monday, Wednesday, and Friday schedule. He became a full-time coach after retiring from playing in 2009.

In 2012, after six years with Dartmouth, Jackson was hired as the director of player relations for Washington State under head coach Mike Leach, who was Jackson's offensive coordinator while playing at Oklahoma.

In 2015, Jackson was hired as the quarterbacks coach for Davidson. In 2016, he was hired as an offensive and recruiting assistant for Mississippi State. In 2017, he returned to Central Oklahoma as the wide receivers coach. In 2019, he rejoined his old head coach, Bob Stoops, as his wide receivers coach for the Dallas Renegades of the newly reborn XFL.

In 2020, after having coached at the high school, collegiate, and professional level, Jackson joined Tyler, a junior college in Texas, as the team's offensive coordinator, quarterbacks coach, and wide receivers coach. While coaching with Tyler, he accepted a position as the wide receivers coach for the Spokane Shock of the Indoor Football League (IFL).

On May 6, 2022, Jackson was tabbed as the head football coach for Texas College as the successor to Greg Ellis. After a winless season in 2021, he led the team to a 1–9 record in his first season as head coach. In his first two seasons as head coach, he led the team to a combined 2–19 record, including a 96–0 loss to UT Permian Basin in the 2022 season opener. In 2024, with a win in the teams opening game, it marked the first time the team ever began a season without a loss since the program restarted in 2003. After leading Texas College to its greatest season in school history with a 7–3 record, Jackson was named Sooner Athletic Conference (SAC) Coach of the Year. He was also honored as the American Football Coaches Association (AFCA) Region 5 Coach of the Year.

== Head coaching record ==
Year	Team	Overall	Conference	Standing	Bowl/playoffs
Texas College Steers (Sooner Athletic Conference) (2022–present)
2022	Texas College	1–9	1–8	9th	
2023	Texas College	1–10	1–7	T–8th	
2024	Texas College	7–3	5–3	T–3rd	
2025	Texas College	1–8	1–7	T–8th	
2026	Texas College	0–0	0–0		
Texas College:		10–30	8–25		
Total:		10–30			
