= Tim Baker (American football) =

American football player (born 1977)

No. 88
- Position: Wide receiver

Personal information
- Born: October 23, 1977 (age 49); Amarillo, Texas, U.S.
- Listed height: 6 ft 4 in (1.93 m)
- Listed weight: 208 lb (94 kg)

Career information
- College: Texas Tech (1997-2000)
- NFL draft: 2001: undrafted

Career history
- Pittsburgh Steelers (2001); Carolina Panthers (2002)*; San Diego Chargers (2003)
- * Offseason or practice squad member only

Awards and highlights
- Second-team All-Big 12 (2000)

Career NFL statistics
- Games: 3
- Stats at Pro Football Reference

Timothy Charles Baker (born October 23, 1977) is an American former professional football player who was a wide receiver in the National Football League (NFL). He played college football for the Texas Tech Red Raiders.
