= Jermaine Alfred =

American football player (born 1976)

Profile
- Position: Quarterback

Personal information
- Born: August 11, 1976 (age 50)

Career information
- College: Baylor

Career history
- Orlando Predators (2002); New Orleans VooDoo (2004)

Career AFL statistics
- Passing yards: 21
- TD–INT: 0–0
- Rushing yards: 9
- Tackles: 1
- Stats at ArenaFan.com

Jermaine Alfred (born August 11, 1976) is an American former football quarterback in the Arena Football League who played for the Orlando Predators and New Orleans VooDoo. He played college football for the Baylor Bears.

== College career ==
Alfred played quarterback for Baylor from 1995 to 1999, appearing in 36 games, only playing a full season as a starter in 1999 going 1-10 that year. He did not play in 1997. He finished his college career with 3,968 passing yards, 16 touchdowns, and 22 interceptions as well as 5 rushing scores and a single punt his senior year.

=== Season-highs ===
- 1,268 passing yards (1998)
- 8 touchdowns (1996)
- 9 interceptions (1999)

=== Rank in school history (as of 2019) ===
- 3,968 passing yards (15th)
- 16 touchdowns (19th)
- 22 interceptions (19th)

== Arena League ==
In the entirety of his Arena League career, he ran the ball twice for nine yards in 2002 for Orlando, and completed one pass for 21 yards and a tackle in 2004 for New Orleans.
