= Brandon Daniels =

American football player (born 1978)

Profile
- Position: Wide receiver

Personal information
- Born: March 10, 1978 (age 48)

Career information
- College: Oklahoma

Career history
- 2004–05: Austin Wranglers
- Stats at ArenaFan.com

Brandon Daniels (born March 10, 1978) is an American former football wide receiver in the Arena Football League who played for the Austin Wranglers. He played college football for the Oklahoma Sooners.

Daniels played quarterback, running back and wide receiver at Oklahoma.
