= Sammy Morris =

American football player and coach (born 1977)

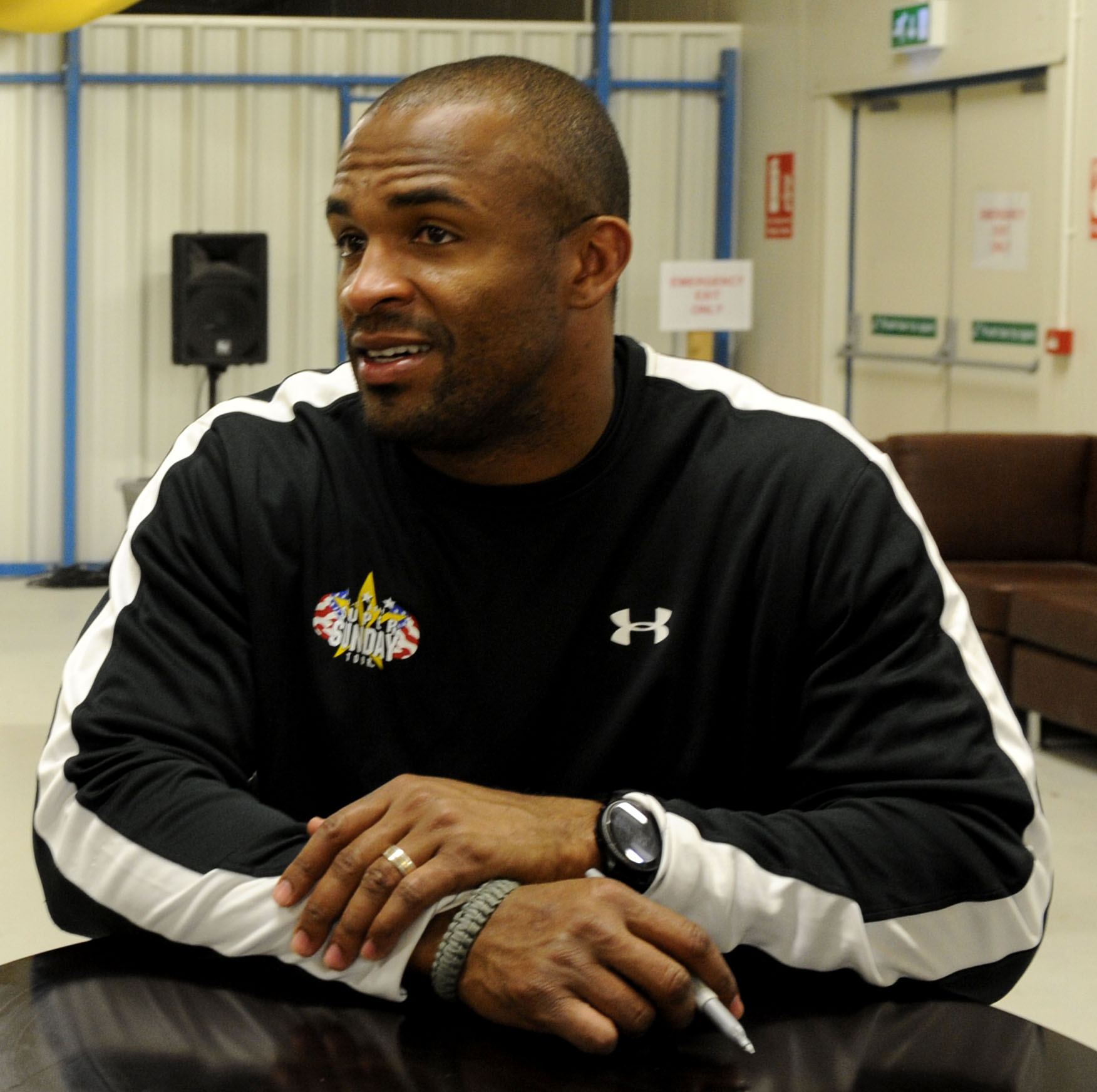
- Morris in 2009

Texas Tech Red Raiders
- Title: Assistant director of player support development

Personal information
- Born: March 23, 1977 (age 49); Oxford, England
- Listed height: 6 ft 0 in (1.83 m)
- Listed weight: 220 lb (100 kg)

Career information
- High school: John Jay (San Antonio, Texas, U.S.)
- College: Texas Tech (1995–1999)
- NFL draft: 2000: 5th round, 156th overall pick

Career history

Playing
- Buffalo Bills (2000–2003); Miami Dolphins (2004–2006); New England Patriots (2007–2010); Dallas Cowboys (2011)

Coaching
- New England Patriots (2016–2017) Assistant strength & conditioning coach; Dean (2018–2020) Running backs & special teams coach

Operations
- Texas Tech (2021–present) Assistant director of player support development

Awards and highlights
- Super Bowl champion (LI)

Career NFL statistics
- Rushing yards: 3,053
- Rushing average: 4.1
- Rushing touchdowns: 26
- Receptions: 166
- Receiving yards: 1,258
- Receiving touchdowns: 1
- Stats at Pro Football Reference

Samuel Morris III (born March 23, 1977) is a former professional American football running back in the National Football League (NFL) for the Buffalo Bills, Miami Dolphins, New England Patriots, and Dallas Cowboys. He was selected by the Bills in the fifth round of the 2000 NFL draft. He played college football at Texas Tech University.

== Early life ==
Morris attended John Jay High School, where he played both quarterback and running back. As a senior, he was named the San Antonio Offensive Player of the Year by the San Antonio Express-News and the District 28-5A MVP.

He accepted a football scholarship from Texas Tech University. As a redshirt freshman in 1996, he appeared in the first eight games of the season, rushing for 226 yards and 4 touchdowns on 29 attempts. The same year, he was placed on academic probation and was forced to take a required academic study course. He was expelled from the school after missing one class and being late for two others. He worked as a short-order cook at Sea World during his time away from football.

In 1997, he missed the season after failing to make the required grades. In 1998, although he earned a 3.0 grade average in the spring semester, he still missed the season after being ruled ineligible by the NCAA, because his course work did not meet NCAA guidelines.

As a senior in 1999, he appeared in 9 games as a team co-captain. He was second on the squad behind Shaud Williams with 562 rushing yards and 3 rushing touchdowns.

== Professional career ==
Pre-draft measurables
| Height | Weight | Arm length | Hand span | 40-yard dash | 10-yard split | 20-yard split | 20-yard shuttle | Three-cone drill | Vertical jump | Broad jump | Bench press |
|---|---|---|---|---|---|---|---|---|---|---|---|
| 5 ft 11 7/8 in (1.83 m) | 221 lb (100 kg) | 31 1/2 in (0.80 m) | 9 7/8 in (0.25 m) | 4.68 s | 1.58 s | 2.70 s | 4.21 s | 7.05 s | 37.5 in (0.95 m) | 9 ft 9 in (2.97 m) | 23 reps |
All values from NFL Combine

=== Buffalo Bills ===
Morris was selected by the Buffalo Bills in the fifth-round (156th overall) of the 2000 NFL draft. As a rookie, he appeared in 12 games with 8 starts, rushing for 341 yards and 5 touchdowns, caught 37 passes for 268 yards and one score, while also making 11 special teams tackles.

In 2001, he appeared in 16 games (one start), leading the team with 28 special teams tackles, while rushing for 72 yards on 20 carries as a backup running back. In 2002, he led the team with 31 special teams tackles. In 2003, he registered 9 special teams tackles in 9 games.

=== Miami Dolphins ===
Morris signed a free agent contract with the Miami Dolphins on March 12, 2004, and though he was expected to be a fullback he ended up being the team's leading rusher following the abrupt retirement of Ricky Williams. He started eight of the 13 games he played in, finishing with 523 rushing yards and six touchdowns.

He backed up rookie running back Ronnie Brown in 2005 and led the Dolphins with 16 special teams tackles. Morris was suspended for the first four games of the 2006 regular season.

=== New England Patriots ===
On March 3, 2007, the New England Patriots signed Morris to a four-year contract. He started two of the first six games of the season, averaging 4.5 yards a carry. On October 14, 2007, Morris suffered a chest injury while playing against the Dallas Cowboys. On November 2, 2007, after missing two games, Morris was placed on injured reserve with a chest injury, ending his season.

In 2009, he made the USA Today All Joe Team after registering 319 rushing yards with 2 touchdowns along with 19 receptions for 180 yards. He missed 4 games with an injury.

=== Dallas Cowboys ===
On December 13, 2011, Morris was signed by the Dallas Cowboys after they placed starting running back DeMarco Murray on injured reserve with a fractured ankle and high ankle sprain. He rushed for 98 yards in three games as a backup. He wasn't re-signed after the season.

== NFL career statistics ==
Legend
| **Bold** | Career high |

=== Regular season ===
| Year | Team | Games | | Rushing | | | | | Receiving | | | | |
| Year | Team | GP | GS | Att | Yds | Avg | Lng | TD | Rec | Yds | Avg | Lng | TD |
|---|---|---|---|---|---|---|---|---|---|---|---|---|---|
| 2000 | BUF | 12 | **8** | 93 | 341 | 3.7 | 32 | 5 | **37** | **268** | 7.2 | 24 | **1** |
| 2001 | BUF | **16** | 1 | 20 | 72 | 3.6 | 10 | 0 | 7 | 36 | 5.1 | 11 | 0 |
| 2002 | BUF | **16** | 0 | 2 | 5 | 2.5 | 5 | 0 | 3 | 48 | **16.0** | 18 | 0 |
| 2003 | BUF | 9 | 0 | 19 | 70 | 3.7 | 12 | 1 | 14 | 100 | 7.1 | 24 | 0 |
| 2004 | MIA | 13 | **8** | 132 | 523 | 4.0 | 35 | 6 | 22 | 124 | 5.6 | 24 | 0 |
| 2005 | MIA | **16** | 2 | 16 | 58 | 3.6 | 9 | 1 | 8 | 54 | 6.8 | 18 | 0 |
| 2006 | MIA | 12 | 4 | 92 | 400 | 4.3 | **55** | 1 | 21 | 162 | 7.7 | **44** | 0 |
| 2007 | NE | 6 | 2 | 85 | 384 | 4.5 | 49 | 3 | 6 | 35 | 5.8 | 18 | 0 |
| 2008 | NE | 13 | 7 | **156** | **727** | **4.7** | 35 | **7** | 17 | 161 | 9.5 | 42 | 0 |
| 2009 | NE | 12 | 5 | 73 | 319 | 4.4 | **55** | 2 | 19 | 180 | 9.5 | 35 | 0 |
| 2010 | NE | **16** | 0 | 20 | 56 | 2.8 | 9 | 0 | 7 | 77 | 11.0 | 22 | 0 |
| 2011 | DAL | 3 | 0 | 28 | 98 | 3.5 | 15 | 0 | 5 | 13 | 2.6 | 9 | 0 |
| | | 144 | 37 | 736 | 3,053 | 4.1 | 55 | 26 | 166 | 1,258 | 7.6 | 44 | 1 |

=== Playoffs ===
| Year | Team | Games | | Rushing | | | | | Receiving | | | | |
| Year | Team | GP | GS | Att | Yds | Avg | Lng | TD | Rec | Yds | Avg | Lng | TD |
|---|---|---|---|---|---|---|---|---|---|---|---|---|---|
| 2009 | NWE | **1** | 0 | **1** | **9** | **9.0** | **9** | 0 | **3** | **15** | **5.0** | **8** | 0 |
| 2010 | NWE | **1** | 0 | 0 | 0 | 0.0 | 0 | 0 | 0 | 0 | 0.0 | 0 | 0 |
| | | 2 | 0 | 1 | 9 | 9.0 | 9 | 0 | 3 | 15 | 5.0 | 8 | 0 |

== Coaching career ==
Morris was an assistant strength and conditioning coach with the Patriots from 2016 to 2018, while simultaneously also being an assistant football coach at Attleboro High School since 2013. In June 2018, he was hired to take over the running back assistant coach position in Dean College.

Morris was named the assistant director of player support development at his alma mater Texas Tech on April 26, 2021.

== Personal life ==
His father Samuel Morris II and his brother Brien Morris, were staff sergeants in the Air Force.
