= Drew Goodman =

American sportscaster

- Born: Drew Ian Goodman; April 13, 1963 (age 63); Pound Ridge, New York, U.S.
- Education: Ithaca College; University of Missouri
- Occupation: Sportscaster
- Years active: 1988–present
- Children: Jacob, Zachary and Gabriel

Drew Ian Goodman (born April 13, 1963) is an American sportscaster. He is the television play-by-play broadcaster for the Colorado Rockies on Rockies.TV.

Goodman's signature home run call is "Take a good look; you won't see it for long!"

== Biography ==
Goodman's Alma Mater are Ithaca College and University of Missouri. Goodman is one of the original employees of Prime Sports Rocky Mountain (now AT&T SportsNet Rocky Mountain), joining the regional sports network in 1988. He has been broadcasting Rockies games since 2002. He had been the host of the Rockies pre-game show before moving into the play-by-play slot.

Goodman has also had extensive work in football, including stints with the NFL on NBC and the NFL on Fox. While with NFL on NBC, he was slated to join Todd Christensen as the #4 announcing team in 1994, then in the next two years, he was slated to join the #7 team, to be paired in 1995 with Tunch Ilkin then with Bob Golic in 1996. However, Jim Lampley moved from the studio host to play-by-play in 1994, with Greg Gumbel taking over as the studio host, so Goodman was not placed into the lineup after all.

Goodman also works college football and occasional NFL games for ESPN radio. In addition to NFL games, Goodman has called games for Baseball Night in America on FOX Sports, college football games for the Big 12, ACC, MWC and WAC Conferences. From 2000 to 2002, he called Denver Broncos preseason games on the Broncos radio network. He also spent five seasons hosting the Broncos postgame report on KOA.

From 1994 to 2004, Goodman was the TV play-by-play announcer for Denver Nuggets telecasts. For three years he was one of a couple announcers nationally to be the lead PXP voice for two professional teams simultaneously. In 1996, he added NHL games to his resume when he started hosting the Avalanche Pregame Report for then, FSN Rocky Mountain. He held the job for six years before becoming the Rockies play-by-play man.

In 1990, Goodman called the initial year of ATP tour coverage for Prime Sports. He also did the play-by-play for the first-ever ATP tennis event in Mainland China for worldwide distribution on Prime International in 1993. He co-hosted the top midday sports radio show with Scott Hastings on 104.3 The Fan in Denver from 2012 to 2014.

For eight years, Goodman covered the men's and women's World Cup, ski racing, college baseball, track and field, gymnastics, wrestling and golf for ESPN. In 2016, he was awarded with his 13th "Colorado Sportscaster of the Year" from the National association of sportscasters and sportswriters. Married to Kristi, they live in the Denver area with their three boys, Jacob, Zach, and Gabriel. He is a 1985 graduate of Ithaca College and its Park School of Communications.
