= 2002 Nebraska Cornhuskers football team =

American college football season

2002 Nebraska Cornhuskers football

Independence Bowl, L 23–27 vs. Ole Miss
- Conference: Big 12 Conference
- North Division
- Record: 7–7 (3–5 Big 12)
- Head coach: Frank Solich (5th season)
- Offensive scheme: I formation
- Defensive coordinator: Craig Bohl (3rd season)
- Base defense: 4–3
- Home stadium: Memorial Stadium

2002 Big 12 Conference football standings
	Conf.			Overall
Team	W		L	W		L
North Division
No. 20 Colorado xy	7	–	1	9	–	5
No. 7 Kansas State	6	–	2	11	–	2
Iowa State	4	–	4	7	–	7
Nebraska	3	–	5	7	–	7
Missouri	2	–	6	5	–	7
Kansas	0	–	8	2	–	10
South Division
No. 5 Oklahoma xy$	6	–	2	12	–	2
No. 6 Texas x	6	–	2	11	–	2
Texas Tech	5	–	3	9	–	5
Oklahoma State	5	–	3	8	–	5
Texas A&M	3	–	5	6	–	6
Baylor	1	–	7	3	–	9
Championship: Oklahoma 29, Colorado 7
$ – BCS representative as conference champion; x – Division champion/co-champions; y – Championship game participant; Rankings from AP Poll

The 2002 Nebraska Cornhuskers football team represented the University of Nebraska–Lincoln in the 2002 NCAA Division I-A football season. The team was coached by Frank Solich and played their home games in Memorial Stadium in Lincoln, Nebraska. Nebraska finished in 4th place in the Big 12 North Division and tied for 8th conference–wide, with a final record of 7–7 (3–5). With their loss to Ole Miss in the Independence Bowl, the Huskers streak of 40 straight winning seasons came to an end. Earlier, a loss to Iowa State knocked the Huskers out of the AP Poll for the first time since October 11, 1981. The run of 348 consecutive weeks in the rankings was the longest in college football history.

== Schedule ==
Date	Time	Opponent	Rank	Site	TV	Result	Attendance	Source
August 24	6:45 pm	Arizona State*	No. 10	Memorial Stadium; Lincoln, NE (BCA Classic)	ESPN	W 48–10	77,779	
August 31	6:00 pm	Troy State*	No. 9	Memorial Stadium; Lincoln, NE		W 31–16	77,831	
September 7	6:00 pm	Utah State*	No. 9	Memorial Stadium; Lincoln, NE		W 44–13	78,176	
September 14	7:00 pm	at Penn State*	No. 8	Beaver Stadium; University Park, PA	ABC	L 7–40	110,753	
September 28	2:30 pm	at No. 19 Iowa State	No. 20	Jack Trice Stadium; Ames, IA (rivalry)	ABC	L 14–36	51,888	
October 5	11:30 am	No. 2 (I-AA) McNeese State*		Memorial Stadium; Lincoln, NE	HDNet	W 38–14	77,192	
October 12	11:30 am	Missouri		Memorial Stadium; Lincoln, NE (rivalry)	PPV	W 24–13	78,014	
October 19	11:30 am	at Oklahoma State		Lewis Field; Stillwater, OK	FSN	L 21–24	45,017	
October 26	6:00 pm	at Texas A&M		Kyle Field; College Station, TX	TBS	W 38–31	81,054	
November 2	6:00 pm	No. 7 Texas		Memorial Stadium; Lincoln, NE	FSN	L 24–27	78,268	
November 9	12:30 pm	Kansas^{†}		Memorial Stadium; Lincoln, NE (rivalry)		W 45–7	77,351	
November 16	11:30 am	at No. 11 Kansas State		KSU Stadium; Manhattan, KS (rivalry)	FSN	L 13–49	52,221	
November 29	2:30 pm	No. 13 Colorado		Memorial Stadium; Lincoln, NE (rivalry)	ABC	L 13–28	77,804	
December 27	3:30 pm	vs. Ole Miss*		Independence Stadium; Shreveport, LA (Independence Bowl)	ESPN	L 23–27	46,096	
*Non-conference game; ^{†}Homecoming; Rankings from AP Poll released prior to the game; All times are in Central time

== Roster and coaching staff ==
2002 Nebraska Cornhuskers football team roster
Players
Coaches
Offense

Pos.	#	Name	Class
SE	38	Brandon Biodrowski	RFr
TE	84	Jon Bowling	Sr
QB	11	Joe Chrisman	Sr
G	59	Wes Cody	Sr
IB	1	Thunder Collins	Sr
SE	32	Kelly Cook	Jr
WB	81	Ben Cornelsen	Sr
TE	80	Will Dabbert	Sr
FB	4	Judd Davies	Jr
IB	25	Josh Davis	Jr
IB	30	Dahrran Diedrick	Sr
G	78	Mike Erickson	So
OT	77	M.J. Flaum	So
WR	28	Isaiah Fluellen	Fr
C	52	John Garrison (C)	Sr
FB	39	Zach Giesselmann	RFr
TE	99	Aaron Golliday	Sr
G	72	Tim Green	Jr
IB	6	DeAntae Grixby	Jr
WB	89	Troy Hassebroek	Sr
TE	42	Matt Herian	Fr
IB	5	David Horne	Fr
OT	51	Richie Incognito	RFr
WB	31	Joel Jackson	So
FB	37	Paul Kastl	Sr
TE	47	Dusty Keiser	So
SE	19	John Klem	Sr
TE	46	John Knopp	Fr
C	75	Brandon Koch	RFr
OT	73	Scott Koethe	Sr
C	74	David Kolowski	Sr
OT	67	Nate Kolterman	Sr
FB	45	Steve Kriewald	So
WR	27	Mark LeFlore	Fr
G	66	Jermaine Leslie	Fr
SE	13	Tim Liley	Jr
C	63	Jack Limbaugh	Jr
WB	12	DeWayne Long	So
OT	76	Chris Loos	Jr
QB	10	Jammal Lord	Jr
OT	65	Nate Manley	RFr
C	64	Kurt Mann	Fr
WB	18	Mike McLaughlin	RFr
SE	14	Ryan Mikluscak	So
FB	32	Grant Miller	Fr
IB	21	Robin Miller	Jr
IB	23	Nanfwang Mutfwang	RFr
G	61	Brian Nelson	Jr
WB	24	Jack O'Holleran	So
WB	8	Ryan Ommert	Jr
TE	82	Phil Peetz	Jr
G	56	Gary Pike	RFr
SE	2	Ross Pilkington	Fr
OT	69	Nick Povendo	So
IB	36	Tim Reese	Jr
TE	86	Kyle Ringenberg	Sr
IB	22	Cory Ross	RFr
G	54	Carson Schott	RFr
SE	85	Matt Schroeder	RFr
TE	83	Chris Septak	So
C	79	Josh Sewell	Jr
TE	87	Alex Shada	So
QB	17	Scott Siefken	So
IB	33	Marques Simmons	RFr
QB	16	Mike Stuntz	So
G	55	Junior Tagoa'i	Jr
SE	9	Wilson Thomas	Sr
OT	57	Cory Timm	Fr
FB	41	Dane Todd	Fr
OT	68	Dan Vili Waldrop	Jr
G	53	Cody Volk	Jr
WB	20	Kiffin Wigert	So
FB	34	Andy Wingender	Jr
TE	44	Matthew Woodward	RFr
SE	3	Ben Zajicek	So

Defense

Pos.	#	Name	Class
RRE	98	Demoine Adams	Sr
NT	96	Titus Adams	RFr
LRE	61	Peter Alta	RFr
LCB	27	Willie Amos	Jr
LG	71	Jake Andersen	So
NT	68	Matt Behrends	Sr
NT	59	Ryon Bingham	Jr
LCB	16	Cole Biodrowski	RFr
FS	21	Philip Bland	So
WILL	39	Chad Buller	Jr
ROV	14	Daniel Bullocks	RFr
FS	20	Josh Bullocks	RFr
LCB	6	Rodney Burgess	Sr
FS	36	Dan Burrow	So
LCB	4	Terrell Butler	Jr
RE	90	Adam Carriker	Fr
NT	55	Jon Clanton	Sr
SLB	11	Ira Cooper	So
DT	97	Seppo Evwaraye	RFr
LRE	62	Anthony Fisher	Fr
WILL	41	Jared Franzluebbers	RFr
WILL	51	Gabe Fries	Sr
DT	99	Brandon Greeson	Fr
RCB	5	DeJuan Groce (C)	Sr
RCB	26	Kevin Guse	Jr
NT	73	Jared Helming	RFr
WILL	17	T.J. Hollowell	Jr
ROV	40	Lannie Hopkins	So
RCB	29	Kellen Huston	So
RCB	49	Adam Ickes	RFr
RRE	88	Trevor Johnson	Jr
DT	94	Patrick Kabongo	Jr
LRE	57	Chris Kelsay (C)	Sr
RRE	95	Nathan Krug	RFr
RE	64	Kristopher Lewin	RFr
FS	15	Brett Lindstrom	Jr
NT	70	Jason Lohr	Sr
FS	32	Derek Matteo	So
RRE	50	Jeff McBride	So
LCB	1	Lornell McPherson	So
WILL	58	Tim Miller	Jr
RE	44	Jay Moore	Fr
DT	63	Matt O'Shea	RFr
ROV	13	Jamie Otto	So
FS	31	Jerrell Pippens	Jr
CB	29	Seth Rexilius	RFr
LCB	28	Pat Ricketts	Jr
ROV	35	James Roark	So
RCB	30	Joey Robinson	RFr
MIKE	38	Barrett Ruud	So
MIKE	42	Steve Safranek	Jr
FS	8	Andrew Shanle	Fr
SLB	43	Scott Shanle	Sr
LRE	76	Matt Shrader	So
RCB	23	Shane Siegel	RFr
MIKE	54	Chad Sievers	So
SLB	45	Jemond Smith	Sr
LRE	92	Justin Smith	Sr
DT	66	Le Kevin Smith	RFr
MIKE	90	Tony Tata	Sr
ROV	2	Aaron Terpening	Sr
LRE	10	Benard Thomas	Jr
CB	25	Fred Thorne	Jr
CB	25	Blake Tiedtke	RFr
LRE	93	Tyler Toline	So
LB	35	Curt Tomasevicz	Jr
CB	3	Fabian Washington	Fr
LCB	12	Jay White	Sr
RCB	33	Seth White	Jr
WILL	7	Demorrio Williams	Jr

Special teams

Pos.	#	Name	Class
PK	26	Josh Brown	Sr
PK	22	Sandro DeAngelis	So
PK	32	Dale Endorf	Jr
P	37	Sam Koch	RFr
P	19	Kyle Larson	Jr
PK	48	Zach Wright	RFr

Head coach

- Frank Solich
  5th season
  24th year at Nebraska
  Alma mater: Nebraska

Coordinators/assistant coaches

- Craig Bohl
  3rd season as DC/LB coach
  11th year at Nebraska
  Alma mater: Nebraska
- Turner Gill
  11th season as QB coach
  11th year at Nebraska
  Alma mater: Nebraska
- Ron Brown
  16th season as WR/TE coach
  16th year at Nebraska
  Alma mater: Brown
- Jeff Jamrog
  3rd season as DL coach
  5th year at Nebraska
  Alma mater: Nebraska
- Dan Young
  20th season as OL/K coach
  20th year at Nebraska
  Alma mater: Reed
- Milt Tenopir
  29th season as OL coach
  29th year at Nebraska
  Alma mater: Sterling
- Nelson Barnes
  6th season as RE coach
  6th year at Nebraska
  Alma mater: North Texas
- George Darlington
  DB coach
  30th year at Nebraska
  Alma mater: Rutgers
- Dave Gillespie
  5th season as RB coach
  14th year at Nebraska
  Alma mater: Nebraska-Omaha
- Boyd Epley
  34th season as S&C coach
  34th year at Nebraska
  Alma mater: Nebraska

Legend

- (C) Team captain
- (S) Suspended
- (I) Ineligible
- Injured
- Redshirt

Roster
Last update: January 16, 2011

=== Depth chart ===
Defense

FS
Josh Bullocks
Jerrell Pippens
⋅

WEAK	MIDDLE	STRONG
Demorrio Williams; T.J. Hollowell	Barrett Ruud	Scott Shanle
Chad Buller	Chad Sievers	Ira Cooper
⋅	⋅	⋅

ROVER
Phillip Bland
Aaron Terpening
Lannie Hopkins
Daniel Bullocks

CB
Fabian Washington
Pat Ricketts
⋅

DE	DT	DT	DE
Demoine Adams; Trevor Johnson	Ryon Bingham	Patrick Kabongo	Chris Kelsay
Titus Adams	Jon Clanton	Le Kevin Smith	Justin Smith
⋅	⋅	⋅	⋅

CB
DeJuan Groce
Lornell McPherson
⋅

Offense

WR
Wilson Thomas
Ross Pilkington
⋅

LT	LG	C	RG	RT
Richie Incognito	Mike Erickson	John Garrison	Wes Cody	Dan Vili Waldrop
Nick Povendo	Junior Tagoa'l	Josh Sewell	Jake Anderson	Nate Kolterman
⋅	⋅	⋅	⋅	⋅

TE
Matt Herian
Aaron Golliday
Jon Bowling

WR
Troy Hassebroek
Ben Cornelson
⋅

QB
Jammal Lord
Mike Stuntz
⋅

RB
Dahrran Diedrick
David Horne
Cory Ross
Josh Davis

FB
Judd Davies
Steve Kriewald
⋅

Special teams
PK Josh Brown
P Kyle Larson
KR Josh Davis
PR DeJuan Groce

== Game summaries ==
=== Arizona State ===
Arizona State at Nebraska [box score]

Team	1	2	3	4	Total
Arizona State	3	0	7	0	10
• Nebraska	3	7	14	24	48

- Date: August 24
- Location: Memorial Stadium, Lincoln, Nebraska
- Game attendance: 77,779
- TV announcers (ESPN): Ron Franklin (Play-by-play), Mike Gottfried (Color), & Adrian Karsten (Sideline)

=== Troy State ===
Troy State at Nebraska [box score]

Team	1	2	3	4	Total
Troy State	0	3	7	6	16
• Nebraska	7	7	14	3	31

- Date: August 31
- Location: Memorial Stadium, Lincoln, Nebraska
- Game start: 6:00 p.m. CST
- Game attendance: 77,831

=== Utah State ===
Utah State at Nebraska [box score]

Team	1	2	3	4	Total
Utah State	7	0	0	6	13
• Nebraska	17	20	7	0	44

- Date: September 7
- Location: Memorial Stadium, Lincoln, Nebraska
- Game start: 6:00 p.m. CST
- Game attendance: 78,176

=== Penn State ===
Nebraska at Penn State [box score]

Team	1	2	3	4	Total
Nebraska	0	7	0	0	7
• Penn State	0	13	20	7	40

- Date: September 14
- Location: Beaver Stadium, University Park, Pennsylvania
- Game start: 7:07 p.m. CST
- Game attendance: 110,753
- TV announcers (ABC): Brad Nessler (Play-by-play), Bob Griese (Color), & Lynn Swann (Sideline)

=== Iowa State ===
Nebraska at Iowa State [box score]

Team	1	2	3	4	Total
Nebraska	0	7	7	0	14
• Iowa State	3	16	7	10	36

- Date: September 28
- Location: Jack Trice Stadium, Ames, Iowa
- Game start: 2:37 p.m. CST
- Game attendance: 51,888
- TV announcers (ABC): Brent Musburger (Play-by-play), Gary Danielson (Color), & Jack Arute (Sideline)

=== McNeese State ===
McNeese State at Nebraska [box score]

Team	1	2	3	4	Total
McNeese State	0	7	0	7	14
• Nebraska	7	14	0	17	38

- Date: October 5
- Location: Memorial Stadium, Lincoln, Nebraska
- Game start: 11:35 a.m. CST
- Game attendance: 77,192
- TV announcers (HDNet): Kevin Kugler, Larry Punteney

This was the first week Nebraska was not featured in the AP Poll since their 59–0 defeat of Colorado on October 10, 1981.

=== Missouri ===
Missouri at Nebraska [box score]

Team	1	2	3	4	Total
Missouri	10	3	0	0	13
• Nebraska	7	7	7	3	24

- Date: October 12
- Location: Memorial Stadium, Lincoln, Nebraska
- Game start: 11:36 a.m. CST
- Game attendance: 78,014
- TV announcers (PPV): Dave Armstrong (Play-by-play), Rich Baldinger (Color), Bill Doleman, & Chris Gerving (Sidelines)

=== Oklahoma State ===
Nebraska at Oklahoma State [box score]

Team	1	2	3	4	Total
Nebraska	0	7	0	14	21
• Oklahoma State	0	3	14	7	24

- Date: October 19
- Location: Lewis Field, Stillwater, Oklahoma
- Game start: 11:39 a.m. CST
- Game attendance: 45,017
- TV announcers (FSN): Bill Land (Play-by-play), Gary Reasons (Color), & Jim Knox (Sideline)

Nebraska's first loss against Oklahoma State since 1961.

=== Texas A&M ===
Nebraska at Texas A&M [box score]

Team	1	2	3	4	Total
• Nebraska	7	7	7	17	38
Texas A&M	14	7	10	0	31

- Date: October 26
- Location: Kyle Field, College Station, Texas
- Game start: 6:07 p.m. CST
- Game attendance: 81,054
- TV announcers (TBS): Ron Thulin (Play-by-play), Charles Davis (Color), Craig Sager, & Erin Andrews (Sidelines)

=== Texas ===
Texas at Nebraska [box score]

Team	1	2	3	4	Total
• Texas	3	3	14	7	27
Nebraska	3	0	7	14	24

- Date: November 2
- Location: Memorial Stadium, Lincoln, Nebraska
- Game start: 6:09 p.m. CST
- Game attendance: 78,268
- TV announcers (FSN): Joel Meyers (Play-by-play), Dave Lapham (Color), & Eric Clemons (Sideline)

=== Kansas ===
Kansas at Nebraska [box score]

Team	1	2	3	4	Total
Kansas	7	0	0	0	7
• Nebraska	14	10	21	0	45

- Date: November 9
- Location: Memorial Stadium, Lincoln, Nebraska
- Game start: 12:30 p.m. CST
- Game attendance: 77,351

=== Kansas State ===
Nebraska at Kansas State [box score]

Team	1	2	3	4	Total
Nebraska	0	6	7	0	13
• Kansas State	14	7	7	21	49

- Date: November 16
- Location: KSU Stadium, Manhattan, Kansas
- Game start: 11:39 a.m. CST
- Game attendance: 52,221
- TV announcers (FSN): Bill Land (Play-by-play), Gary Reasons (Color), & Jim Knox (Sideline)

=== Colorado ===
Colorado at Nebraska [box score]

Team	1	2	3	4	Total
• Colorado	7	0	14	7	28
Nebraska	0	10	3	0	13

- Date: November 29
- Location: Memorial Stadium, Lincoln, Nebraska
- Game start: 2:36 p.m. CST
- Game attendance: 77,804
- TV announcers (ABC): Brad Nessler (Play-by-play), Bob Griese (Color), & Lynn Swann (Sideline)

=== Ole Miss ===
Nebraska vs Ole Miss [box score]

Team	1	2	3	4	Total
Nebraska	3	14	3	3	23
• Ole Miss	0	14	10	3	27

- Date: December 27
- Location: Independence Stadium, Shreveport, Louisiana
- Game start: 3:38 p.m. CST
- Game attendance: 46,096
- TV announcers (ESPN): Jeff Hullinger (Play-by-play), Todd Christensen (Color), & Stacy Paetz (Sideline)

== Rankings ==
Ranking movements Legend: ██ Increase in ranking ██ Decrease in ranking — = Not ranked
	Week																	
Poll	Pre	1	2	3	4	5	6	7	8	9	10	11	12	13	14	15	16	Final
AP	10	9	9	8	18	20	—	—	—	—	—	—	—	—	—	—	—	—
Coaches Poll	8	8	8	7	19	19	—	—	—	—	—	—	—	—	—	—	—	—
BCS	Not released									—	—	—	—	—	—	—	—	Not released

== After the season ==
Nebraska finished in 4th place in the Big 12 North Division and tied for 8th conference-wide, with a final record of 7–7 (3–5).

=== Awards ===
Award	Name(s)
All-America 1st team	DeJuan Groce, Richie Incognito
All-America 2nd team	Fabian Washington
All-America 4th team	David Horne
All-Big 12 1st team	Josh Brown, DeJuan Groce, Richie Incognito
All-Big 12 2nd team	John Garrison, Chris Kelsay, Kyle Larson
All-Big 12 3rd team	Dahrran Diedrick
Freshman All-Big 12 1st team	Matt Herian, David Horne, Richie Incognito, Ross Pilkington, Le Kevin Smith, Fabian Washington

=== NFL and pro players ===
The following Nebraska players who participated in the 2002 season later moved on to the next level and joined a professional or semi-pro team as draftees or free agents.

Name	Team
Demoine Adams	Edmonton Eskimos
Titus Adams	New York Jets
Ryon Bingham	San Diego Chargers
Josh Brown	Seattle Seahawks
Daniel Bullocks	Detroit Lions
Josh Bullocks	New Orleans Saints
Adam Carriker	St. Louis Rams
Josh Davis	New York Jets
Aaron Golliday	Scottish Claymores
DeJuan Groce	St. Louis Rams
T. J. Hollowell	New York Giants
Richie Incognito	St. Louis Rams
Trevor Johnson	New York Jets
Patrick Kabongo	Detroit Lions
Chris Kelsay	Buffalo Bills
Sam Koch	Baltimore Ravens
Kyle Larson	Cincinnati Bengals
Jammal Lord	Houston Texans
Jay Moore	San Francisco 49ers
Jerrell Pippens	Chicago Bears
Cory Ross	Baltimore Ravens
Barrett Ruud	Tampa Bay Buccaneers
Scott Shanle	St. Louis Rams
Le Kevin Smith	New England Patriots
Fabian Washington	Oakland Raiders
Demorrio Williams	Atlanta Falcons
