= 2002 Kansas State Wildcats football team =

American college football season

2002 Kansas State Wildcats football

Holiday Bowl champion

Holiday Bowl, W 34–27 vs. Arizona State
- Conference: Big 12 Conference
- North Division

Ranking
- Coaches: No. 6
- AP: No. 7
- Record: 11–2 (6–2 Big 12)
- Head coach: Bill Snyder (14th season)
- Offensive coordinator: Ron Hudson (6th season)
- Offensive scheme: Pro-style
- Co-defensive coordinators: Bret Bielema (1st season); Bob Elliott (1st season)
- Base defense: 4–3
- Home stadium: KSU Stadium

2002 Big 12 Conference football standings
	Conf.			Overall
Team	W		L	W		L
North Division
No. 20 Colorado xy	7	–	1	9	–	5
No. 7 Kansas State	6	–	2	11	–	2
Iowa State	4	–	4	7	–	7
Nebraska	3	–	5	7	–	7
Missouri	2	–	6	5	–	7
Kansas	0	–	8	2	–	10
South Division
No. 5 Oklahoma xy$	6	–	2	12	–	2
No. 6 Texas x	6	–	2	11	–	2
Texas Tech	5	–	3	9	–	5
Oklahoma State	5	–	3	8	–	5
Texas A&M	3	–	5	6	–	6
Baylor	1	–	7	3	–	9
Championship: Oklahoma 29, Colorado 7
$ – BCS representative as conference champion; x – Division champion/co-champions; y – Championship game participant; Rankings from AP Poll

The 2002 Kansas State Wildcats football team represented Kansas State University in the 2002 NCAA Division I-A football season. The team's head coach was Bill Snyder. The Wildcats play their home games in KSU Stadium. 2002 saw the Wildcats finish with a record of 11–2, and a 6–2 record in Big 12 Conference play. The season culminated with a win over Arizona State in the 2002 Holiday Bowl. Prior to the 2002 season, the artificial turf was updated to a more cushioned FieldTurf surface at a cost of $800,000.

The Wildcats finished the 2002 season leading NCAA Division I-A in scoring defense (11.8 points per game) and also tied a school record by posting three shut outs. The team shut out Louisiana–Monroe, Kansas, and Missouri. The Wildcats also recorded a shut out on the road for the first time since the 1973 season. They recorded two shut outs on the road, beating Kansas and Missouri. The Wildcats scored 582 points in the season, good for second most all-time at Kansas State.

== Schedule ==
Date	Time	Opponent	Rank	Site	TV	Result	Attendance
August 31	6:10 p.m.	No. 18 (I-AA) Western Kentucky*		KSU Stadium; Manhattan, KS		W 48–3	45,844
September 7	6:10 p.m.	Louisiana–Monroe*		KSU Stadium; Manhattan, KS		W 68–0	43,104
September 14	1:10 p.m.	No. 8 (I-AA) Eastern Illinois*		KSU Stadium; Manhattan, KS		W 63–13	45,642
September 21	6:00 p.m.	No. 11 USC*	No. 25	KSU Stadium; Manhattan, KS	TBS	W 27–20	49,276
October 5	2:30 p.m.	at Colorado	No. 13	Folsom Field; Boulder, CO (rivalry)	ABC	L 31–35	52,584
October 12	1:10 p.m.	Oklahoma State^{†}	No. 19	KSU Stadium; Manhattan, KS		W 44–9	48,404
October 19	6:00 p.m.	No. 8 Texas	No. 17	KSU Stadium; Manhattan, KS	FSN	L 14–17	50,659
October 26	2:00 p.m.	at Baylor	No. 20	Floyd Casey Stadium; Waco, TX		W 44–10	20,247
November 2	1:00 p.m.	at Kansas	No. 14	Memorial Stadium; Lawrence, KS (rivalry)		W 64–0	43,000
November 9	6:00 p.m.	No. 21 Iowa State	No. 12	KSU Stadium; Manhattan, KS (rivalry)	TBS	W 58–7	49,504
November 16	11:30 a.m.	Nebraska	No. 11	KSU Stadium; Manhattan, KS (rivalry)	FSN	W 49–13	52,221
November 23	2:30 p.m.	at Missouri	No. 10	Faurot Field; Columbia, MO	ABC	W 38–0	47,507
December 27	7:00 p.m.	vs. Arizona State*	No. 6	Qualcomm Stadium; San Diego, CA (Holiday Bowl)	ESPN	W 34–27	58,717
*Non-conference game; ^{†}Homecoming; Rankings from AP Poll released prior to the game; All times are in Central time

== Rankings ==
Ranking movements Legend: ██ Increase in ranking ██ Decrease in ranking — = Not ranked
	Week																	
Poll	Pre	1	2	3	4	5	6	7	8	9	10	11	12	13	14	15	16	Final
AP	—	—	—	—	25	15	13	19	17	20	14	12	11	10	8	6	6	7
Coaches	—	—	—	—	23	17	16	23	19	21	14	12	11	10	8	6	6	6
BCS	Not released									—	15	15	12	11	10	8	8	Not released

== Game summaries ==
=== Western Kentucky ===
No. 18 Western Kentucky Hilltoppers at Kansas State Wildcats – Game summary

Quarter	1	2	3	4	Total
No. 18 Hilltoppers	0	0	0	3	3
Wildcats	3	31	7	7	48

at KSU Stadium, Manhattan, Kansas

- Date: August 31
- Game time: 6:10 p.m. CDT
- Game weather: Clear, 89 °F (32 °C)
- Game attendance: 45,844
- Referee: John Laurie
- Box score, Recap

Game information
First quarter
- KSU – Joe Rheem 36-yard field goal, 10:26. Wildcats 3–0. Drive: 11 plays, 61 yards, 4:34.

Second quarter

- KSU – Ayo Saba 2-yard run (Joe Rheem kick), 12:57. Wildcats 10–0. Drive: 14 plays, 80 yards, 5:57.
- KSU – Bobby Walker 73-yard interception return (Joe Rheem kick), 8:56. Wildcats 17–0.
- KSU – Danny Morris 7-yard run (Joe Rheem kick), 4:51. Wildcats 24–0. Drive: 3 plays, 62 yards, 1:01.
- KSU – Darren Sproles 9-yard run (Joe Rheem kick), 3:45. Wildcats 31–0. Drive: 1 play, 9 yards, 0:06.
- KSU – Joe Rheem 38-yard field goal, 0:00. Wildcats 34–0. Drive: 7 plays, 27 yards, 0:00.

Third quarter

- KSU – Ell Roberson 18-yard run (Joe Rheem kick), 3:47. Wildcats 41–0. Drive: 9 plays, 69 yards, 4:31.

Fourth quarter

- WKU – Peter Martinez 30-yard field goal, 7:18. Wildcats 41–3. Drive: 13 plays, 60 yards, 6:09.
- KSU – Ayo Saba 2-yard run (Jared Brite kick), 1:27. Wildcats 48–3. Drive: 14 plays, 89 yards, 5:51.

Statistics	WKU	KSU
First downs	12	23
Total yards	183	412
Rushing yards	110	240
Passing yards	73	172
Turnovers	2	0
Time of possession	31:55	27:14

Team	Category	Player	Statistics
Western Kentucky	Passing	Jason Michael	7/11, 73 yards, INT
Western Kentucky	Rushing	Maurice Bradley	19 rushes, 64 yards
Western Kentucky	Receiving	Casey Rooney	2 receptions, 28 yards
Kansas State	Passing	Ell Roberson	4/8, 108 yards
Kansas State	Rushing	Darren Sproles	19 rushes, 135 yards, TD
Kansas State	Receiving	Derrick Evans	3 receptions, 74 yards

=== Eastern Illinois ===
	1	2	3	4	Total
Panthers	13	0	0	0	13
Wildcats	15	28	13	7	63

Tony Romo was 13-14 for 120 yards and a TD in the first quarter, but Kansas State grabbed control and cruised to the 50-point win.

=== No. 11 USC ===
USC at Kansas State

Team	1	2	3	4	Total
No. 11 Trojans	0	6	0	14	20
• No. 25 Wildcats	0	12	7	8	27

- Date: September 21
- Location: KSU Stadium, Manhattan, KS
- Game start: 6:00 p.m. CDT
- Game attendance: 49,276
- Referee: John Laurie
- TV announcers (TBS): Ron Thulin, Charles Davis, Craig Sager, and Erin Andrews

Scoring summary
2	5:43	KSU	Jared Brite 35-yard field goal	KSU 3-0
2	3:46	KSU	Ell Roberson 1-yard fun (Brite kick)	KSU 10-0
2	0:32	USC	Mike Patterson 3-yard fumble return (kick blocked)	KSU 10-6
2	0:32	KSU	Terence Newman 98-yard PAT return	KSU 12-6
3	3:55	KSU	Darren Sproles 10-yard fun (Brite kick)	KSU 19-6
4	14:55	KSU	James Terry 10-yard pass from Ell Roberson (Roberson run)	KSU 27-6
4	10:21	USC	Keary Colbert 9-yard pass from Carson Palmer (Ryan Killeen kick)	KSU 27-13
4	6:31	USC	Sultan McCullough 25-yard run (Killeen kick)	KSU 27-20

Junior quarterback Ell Roberson came off the bench early in the 2nd quarter to give the Wildcats a spark. Kansas State built a 27–6 lead before USC scored two 4th quarter touchdowns to make it a one-possession game. Eventual Heisman Trophy winner Carson Palmer completed only 18 of 47 passes for 186 yards.

Statistics	USC	KSU
First downs	16	19
Total yards	276	347
Rushing yards	90	188
Passing yards	186	159
Turnovers	1	5
Time of possession	29:37	30:23

=== At Colorado ===
No. 13 Kansas State at Colorado

Team	1	2	3	4	Total
No. 13 Wildcats	0	14	14	3	31
• Buffaloes	14	14	7	0	35

- Date: October 5
- Location: Folsom Field, Boulder, Colorado
- Game start: 2:30 p.m. CDT
- Game attendance: 52,584
- TV announcers (ABC): Brent Musburger, Gary Danielson, Jack Arute

=== Oklahoma State ===
	1	2	3	4	Total
Cowboys	0	9	0	0	9
Wildcats	12	13	6	13	44

=== No. 8 Texas ===
Texas at Kansas State

Team	1	2	3	4	Total
• No. 8 Longhorns	0	7	7	3	17
No. 17 Wildcats	0	6	0	8	14

- Date: October 19
- Location: KSU Stadium
- Game attendance: 50,659

=== At Kansas ===
	1	2	3	4	Total
Wildcats	30	13	21	0	64
Jayhawks	0	0	0	0	0

=== No. 21 Iowa State ===
Iowa State at Kansas State

Team	1	2	3	4	Total
No. 21 Cyclones	7	0	0	0	7
• No. 12 Wildcats	13	17	28	0	58

- Date: November 9
- Location: KSU Stadium
- Game attendance: 49,504
- Referee: Cooper Castleberry
- TV announcers (TBS): Ron Thulin, Charles Davis, Craig Sager, and Erin Andrews

=== Nebraska ===
Nebraska at Kansas State

Team	1	2	3	4	Total
Cornhuskers	0	6	7	0	13
• No. 11 Wildcats	14	7	7	21	49

- Date: November 16
- Location: KSU Stadium, Manhattan, Kansas
- Game start: 11:39 a.m. CST
- Game attendance: 52,221
- TV announcers (FSN): Bill Land, Gary Reasons, and Jim Knox

Statistics	NEB	KSU
First downs	15	24
Total yards	231	507
Rushing yards	97	415
Passing yards	134	92
Turnovers	0	3
Time of possession	27:30	32:30

=== At Missouri ===
	1	2	3	4	Total
Wildcats	10	7	14	7	38
Tigers	0	0	0	0	0

=== Vs. Arizona State (Holiday Bowl) ===
Kansas State vs. Arizona State

Team	1	2	3	4	Total
• No. 6 Wildcats	0	14	0	20	34
Sun Devils	0	20	0	7	27

- Date: December 27
- Location: Qualcomm Stadium, San Diego, CA
- Game start: 7:00 p.m. CST
- Game attendance: 58,717
- TV announcers (ESPN): Mike Tirico, Kirk Herbstreit, Lee Corso, and Dr. Jerry Punch

== Roster ==
2002 Kansas State Wildcats football team roster
Players
Coaches
Offense

Pos.	#	Name	Class
OT	65	Thomas Barnett	Sr
OT	79	Jon Doty	So
QB	5	Marc Dunn	Sr
TE	88	Thomas Hill	Jr
OL	53	Nick Leckey	Jr
OL	64	Ryan Lilja	Jr
QB	3	Ell Roberson	Jr
RB	36	Ayo Saba	Fr
QB	14	Jeff Schwinn	Jr
WR	13	Brandon Solt	Sr
RB	43	Darren Sproles	So
WR	82	James Terry	Jr
WR	8	Taco Wallace	Sr
TE	81	Nick Warren	Sr
C	78	Steve Washington	Sr
OL	71	Michael Weiner	So
QB	14	Eric Williams	Jr

Defense

Pos.	#	Name	Class
DL	90	Henry Bryant	Sr
LB	7	Josh Buhl	Jr
LB	58	Quinton Dunham	Fr
LB	18	Bryan Hickman	Jr
DB	9	Randy Jordan	Jr
DB	8	James McGill	Sr
CB	4	Terence Newman	Sr
LB	56	Terry Pierce	Jr
DL	30	Tank Reese	Sr
DE	83	Blake Seiler	Fr
DE	98	Andrew Shull	Jr
LB	45	Ted Sims	Fr
DB	29	Henry Thomas	So
DT	96	Jerry Togiai	Sr
CB	2	DeRon Tyler	Sr
CB	1	Bobby Walker	Sr
FS	2	Rashad Washington	Jr
DT	62	Corey White	Sr
DE	97	Melvin Williams	Sr
DB	26	Tyler Woolfolk	So
FS	12	Derrick Yates	Sr

Special teams

Pos.	#	Name	Class
K/P	6	Jared Brite	Jr
K	15	Joe Rheem	So
K/P	19	Jeff Snodgrass	Fr
LS	52	Russ Vanover	So
LS	72	Mike Wilson	Jr

Head coach

- Bill Snyder

Coordinators/assistant coaches

- Ron Hudson – Offensive coordinator & quarterbacks
- Michel Smith – Running backs
- Greg Peterson – Wide receivers, passing game coordinator, & recruiting coordinator
- Matt Miller – Tight ends
- Paul Dunn – Offensive line
- Bret Bielema – Co-Defensive coordinator
- Bob Elliot – Co-Defensive coordinator & secondary
- Mo Lattimore – interior Defensive line
- Del Miller – Defensive ends

Legend

- (C) Team captain
- (S) Suspended
- (I) Ineligible
- Injured
- Redshirt

== Statistics ==
=== Scores by quarter ===
	1	2	3	4	Total
Kansas State	128	191	148	115	582
Opponents	34	65	28	27	154

=== Team ===
	KSU	Opp
Scoring	582	154
Points per game	44.8	11.8
First downs	273	175
Rushing	168	58
Passing	85	97
Penalty	20	20
Total offense	5,499	3237
Avg per play	6.3	3.7
Avg per game	423.0	249.0
Fumbles-Lost	37–18	23–13
Penalties-Yards	100–759	95–723
Avg per game	58.4	58.4

	KSU	Opp
Punts-Yards	55–2,186	105–3974
Avg per punt	39.7	37.8
Time of possession/Game	31:13	28:47
3rd down conversions	76/166	58/205
4th down conversions	12/17	6/18
Touchdowns scored	79	19
Field goals-Attempts	11–16	7–12
PAT-Attempts	65–74	17–18
Attendance	384,654	163,338
Games/Avg per Game	8/48,082	4/40,834

=== Offense ===
==== Rushing ====
Name	GP	Att	Gain	Loss	Net	Avg	TD	Long	Avg/G
Darren Sproles	13	237	1,517	52	1,465	6.2	17	80	112.7
Ell Roberson	12	202	1,276	244	1,032	5.1	16	91	86.0
Terrence Newman	13	2	29	3	26	13.0	0	29	2.0
Total	13	655	3,823	390	3,433	5.2	53	91	264.1
Opponents	13	446	1,405	501	904	2.0	7	85	69.5

==== Passing ====
Name	GP-GS	Effic	Att-Cmp-Int	Yds	TD	Lng	Avg/G	Pct.
Ell Roberson	12	136.47	175–91–4	1580	7	56	131.7	52.0
Marc Dunn	10	199.92	35–22–2	383	6	58	38.3	62.9
Total	13	146.97	223–120–6	2,066	14	58	158.9	53.8
Opponents	13	91.69	418–191–20	2,333	11	94	179.5	45.7

==== Receiving ====
Name	GP	No.	Yds	Avg	TD	Long	Avg/G
Taco Wallace	13	39	704	18.1	5	58	54.2
James Terry	12	28	561	20.0	5	56	46.8
Total	13	120	2,066	17.2	14	58	158.9
Opponents	13	191	2,333	12.2	11	94	179.5

== Awards and honors ==
- Terence Newman – Jim Thorpe Award and Consensus First-team All-American

== 2003 NFL draft ==
Player	Position	Round	Pick	NFL club
Terence Newman	Cornerback	1	5	Dallas Cowboys
Terry Pierce	Linebacker	2	51	Denver Broncos
Melvin Williams	Defensive end	5	155	New Orleans Saints
Taco Wallace	Wide receiver	7	224	Seattle Seahawks
