= 2002 Colorado Buffaloes football team =

American college football season

2002 Colorado Buffaloes football

Big 12 North champion

Big 12 Championship Game, L 7–29 vs. Oklahoma

Alamo Bowl, L 28–31 ^{OT} vs. Wisconsin
- Conference: Big 12 Conference
- North Division

Ranking
- Coaches: No. 21
- AP: No. 20
- Record: 9–5 (7–1 Big 12)
- Head coach: Gary Barnett (4th season)
- Offensive coordinator: Shawn Watson (3rd season)
- Offensive scheme: Multiple
- Co-defensive coordinators: Tom McMahon (4th season); Vince Okruch (4th season)
- Base defense: Multiple 4–3
- MVP: Chris Brown
- Captains: Justin Bates; Tyler Brayton; Wayne Lucier
- Home stadium: Folsom Field

2002 Big 12 Conference football standings
	Conf.			Overall
Team	W		L	W		L
North Division
No. 20 Colorado xy	7	–	1	9	–	5
No. 7 Kansas State	6	–	2	11	–	2
Iowa State	4	–	4	7	–	7
Nebraska	3	–	5	7	–	7
Missouri	2	–	6	5	–	7
Kansas	0	–	8	2	–	10
South Division
No. 5 Oklahoma xy$	6	–	2	12	–	2
No. 6 Texas x	6	–	2	11	–	2
Texas Tech	5	–	3	9	–	5
Oklahoma State	5	–	3	8	–	5
Texas A&M	3	–	5	6	–	6
Baylor	1	–	7	3	–	9
Championship: Oklahoma 29, Colorado 7
$ – BCS representative as conference champion; x – Division champion/co-champions; y – Championship game participant; Rankings from AP Poll

The 2002 Colorado Buffaloes football team represented the University of Colorado at Boulder during the 2002 NCAA Division I-A football season. The team played their home games at Folsom Field in Boulder, Colorado. They participated in the Big 12 Conference in the North Division. They were coached by head coach Gary Barnett. Colorado played in the Big 12 Championship Game for the second time, but lost to Oklahoma.

== Schedule ==
Date	Time	Opponent	Rank	Site	TV	Result	Attendance
August 31	11:00 am	vs. Colorado State*	No. 7	Invesco Field at Mile High; Denver, CO (Rocky Mountain Showdown)	ESPN2	L 14–19	75,531
September 7	5:00 pm	San Diego State*	No. 17	Folsom Field; Boulder, CO	FSN	W 34–14	44,126
September 14	1:30 pm	No. 17 USC*	No. 18	Folsom Field; Boulder, CO	ABC	L 3–40	53,119
September 21	1:30 pm	at No. 20 UCLA*		Rose Bowl; Pasadena, CA	ABC	W 31–17	63,880
October 5	1:30 pm	No. 13 Kansas State^{†}		Folsom Field; Boulder, CO (rivalry)	ABC	W 35–31	52,584
October 12	12:00 pm	at Kansas		Memorial Stadium; Lawrence, KS		W 53–29	34,500
October 19	1:00 pm	Baylor	No. 23	Folsom Field; Boulder, CO		W 34–0	46,281
October 26	11:30 am	Texas Tech	No. 21	Folsom Field; Boulder, CO	FSN	W 37–13	50,478
November 2	1:30 pm	at No. 2 Oklahoma	No. 13	Gaylord Family Oklahoma Memorial Stadium; Norman, OK	ABC	L 11–27	75,403
November 9	10:30 am	at Missouri	No. 18	Faurot Field; Columbia, MO	FSN	W 42–35 ^{OT}	48,465
November 16	5:00 pm	Iowa State	No. 17	Folsom Field; Boulder, CO	FSN	W 41–27	48,728
November 29	1:30 pm	at Nebraska	No. 13	Memorial Stadium; Lincoln, NE (rivalry)	ABC	W 28–13	77,804
December 7	6:00 pm	vs. No. 8 Oklahoma	No. 12	Reliant Stadium; Houston, TX (Big 12 Championship Game)	ABC	L 7–29	63,332
December 28	6:00 pm	vs. Wisconsin*	No. 14	Alamodome; San Antonio, TX (Alamo Bowl)	ESPN	L 28–31 ^{OT}	50,690
*Non-conference game; ^{†}Homecoming; Rankings from AP Poll released prior to the game; All times are in Mountain time

== Roster ==
2002 Colorado Buffaloes football team roster
Players
Coaches
Offense

Pos.	#	Name	Class
TB	2	Brian Calhoun	Fr
QB	10	James Cox	Fr
QB	14	Joel Klatt	Fr
WR	15	Jeremy Bloom	Fr
WR	16	Tom Hubbard	Fr
RB	21	Marcus Houston	So
RB	22	Chris Brown	Jr
FB	34	Lawrence Vickers	Fr
TE	44	Beau Williams	Sr
TE	45	Quinn Sypniewski	Jr
WR	48	Nick Holz	Fr
OL	58	Mark Fenton	Fr
G	62	Marwan Hage	Jr
OL	71	Clint Werth	Jr
C	78	Wayne Lucier	Sr
WR	80	Derek McCoy	Jr
WR	81	Jason Burianek	Sr
WR	83	Daric Wilhite	Fr
TE	84	Jake Jones	Jr
WR	88	D.J. Hackett	Jr
TE	89	Joe Klopfenstein	Fr
SE	90	Sam Wilder	So

Defense

Pos.	#	Name	Class
CB	4	Donald Strickland	Sr
DB	7	Vance Washington	Fr
OLB	16	Drew Wahlroos	Sr
S	27	Brian Iwuh	Fr
DE	30	Marques Harris	So
LB	39	Akarika Dawn	Fr
ILB	49	Thaddaeus Washington	Fr
DT	53	Geoff Whittaker	So
LB	54	Sean Tufts	Jr
DE	60	Matt McChesney	Jr
DT	93	Vaka Manupuna	Fr
DE	97	Gabe Nyenhuis	Jr
DE	99	Tyler Brayton	Sr

Special teams

Pos.	#	Name	Class
P	8	Mark Mariscal	Sr
K	25	Pat Brougham	Sr
K	28	Justin Zaitz	Fr

Head coach

- Gary Barnett

Coordinators/assistant coaches

Legend

- (C) Team captain
- (S) Suspended
- (I) Ineligible
- Injured
- Redshirt

Roster

== Game summaries ==
=== No. 17 USC ===
No. 17 USC at No. 18 Colorado

Team	1	2	3	4	Total
• #17 USC	14	6	0	20	40
#18 Colorado	0	0	3	0	3

- Date: September 14
- Location: Folsom Field, Boulder, Colorado
- Game start: 1:30 p.m. MST
- Game attendance: 53,119
- TV announcers (ABC): Keith Jackson, Dan Fouts, Todd Harris

Scoring summary
1	9:56	USC	Malaefou MacKenzie 32-yard pass from Carson Palmer (David Davis kick)	USC 7-0
1	2:46	USC	Malaefou MacKenzie 14-yard run (David Davis kick)	USC 14-0
2	2:08	USC	Sultan McCullough 62-yard run (kick failed)	USC 20-0
3	2:51	COL	Patrick Brougham 42-yard field goal	USC 20-3
4	10:24	USC	Carson Palmer 1-yard run (David Davis kick)	USC 27-3
4	8:47	USC	Mike Ross recovered blocked punt in end zone (kick failed)	USC 33-3
4	2:47	USC	Darryl Poston 4-yard run (David Davis kick)	USC 40-3

=== No. 13 Kansas State ===
#13 Kansas State at Colorado

Team	1	2	3	4	Total
#13 Wildcats	0	14	14	3	31
• Buffaloes	14	14	7	0	35

- Date: October 5
- Location: Folsom Field, Boulder, Colorado
- Game start: 1:30 p.m. MST
- Game attendance: 52,584
- TV announcers (ABC): Brent Musburger, Gary Danielson, Jack Arute

=== Texas Tech ===
Texas Tech Red Raiders at #21 Colorado Buffaloes

Team	1	2	3	4	Total
Red Raiders	10	3	0	0	13
• No. 21 Buffaloes	10	6	14	7	37

- Date: October 26
- Location: Folsom Field, Boulder, Colorado
- Game start: 11:30 a.m. MST
- Game attendance: 50,478
- TV announcers (FSN): Bill Land, Gary Reasons, Jim Knox

=== At No. 2 Oklahoma ===
#13 Colorado Buffaloes at #2 Oklahoma Sooners

Team	1	2	3	4	Total
#13 Colorado	3	0	8	0	11
• #2 Oklahoma	10	10	7	0	27

- Date: November 2
- Location: Gaylord Family Oklahoma Memorial Stadium, Norman, Oklahoma
- Game start: 1:35 p.m. MST
- Elapsed time: 3:15
- Game attendance: 75,403
- Referee: Randy Christal
- TV announcers (ABC): Brent Musburger (Play–by–play), Gary Danielson (Color), & Jack Arute (Sideline)

=== Iowa State ===
Iowa State Cyclones at #17 Colorado Buffaloes

Team	1	2	3	4	Total
Iowa State	7	7	6	7	27
• #17 Colorado	3	14	3	21	41

- Date: November 16
- Location: Folsom Field, Boulder, CO
- Game start: 5:00 p.m. MST
- Game attendance: 48,728
- TV announcers (FSN): Bill Land (Play-by-play), Gary Reasons (Color), & Zach Klein (Sideline)

Scoring summary
1	COL	Patrick Brougham 44-yard field goal	Colorado 3–0
1	ISU	Michael Wagner 5-yard run (Adam Benike kick)	Iowa St 7–3
2	COL	D.J. Hackett 8-yard pass from Robert Hodge (Patrick Brougham kick)	Colorado 10–7
2	ISU	Lance Young 50-yard pass from Seneca Wallace (Adam Benike kick)	Iowa St 14–10
2	COL	Chris Brown 5-yard run (Patrick Brougham kick)	Colorado 17–14
3	ISU	Joe Woodley 1-yard run (kick failed)	Iowa St 21–17
3	COL	Patrick Brougham 41-yard field goal	Iowa St 21–20
4	COL	Derek McCoy 7-yard pass from Robert Hodge (Patrick Brougham kick)	Colorado 27–21
4	COL	Medford Moorer 71-yard fumble return (Patrick Brougham kick)	Colorado 34–21
4	ISU	Seneca Wallace 6-yard run (Adam Benike kick)	Colorado 34–28
4	COL	Bobby Purify 6-yard run (Patrick Brougham kick)	Colorado 41–28

=== At Nebraska ===
#13 Colorado Buffaloes at Nebraska Cornhuskers

Team	1	2	3	4	Total
• #13 Colorado	7	0	14	7	28
Nebraska	0	10	3	0	13

- Date: November 29
- Location: Memorial Stadium, Lincoln, Nebraska
- Game start: 1:36 p.m. MST
- Game attendance: 77,804
- TV announcers (ABC): Brad Nessler (play-by-play), Bob Griese (color), & Lynn Swann (sideline)

=== Vs. No. 8 Oklahoma (Big 12 Championship game) ===
#8 Oklahoma Sooners vs. #12 Colorado Buffaloes

Team	1	2	3	4	Total
• #8 Oklahoma	7	6	6	10	29
#12 Colorado	0	0	7	0	7

- Date: December 7
- Location: Reliant Stadium, Houston, Texas
- Game start: 7:07 p.m. CST
- Elapsed time: 3:05
- Game attendance: 63,332
- Referee: Jon Bible
- TV announcers (ABC): Brent Musburger (Play–by–play), Gary Danielson (Color) & Jack Arute (Sideline)

=== Vs. Wisconsin (Alamo Bowl) ===
#14 Colorado Buffaloes vs. Wisconsin Badgers (Alamo Bowl)

Team	1	2	3	4	OT	Total
No. 14 Colorado	14	0	14	0	0	28
• Wisconsin	7	14	0	7	3	31

- Date: December 28
- Location: Alamodome, San Antonio, Texas
- Game start: 6:00 p.m. MST
- Game attendance: 50,690
- TV announcers (ESPN): Ron Franklin, Mike Gottfried, Adrian Karsten

== Awards and honors ==
- Mark Mariscal – Ray Guy Award, Consensus All-American
- Chris Brown – All-American (AFCA)
- Wayne Lucier – All-American (TSN)
