= 2002 Oklahoma State Cowboys football team =

American college football season

2002 Oklahoma State Cowboys football

Houston Bowl champion

Houston Bowl, W 33–23 vs. Southern Miss
- Conference: Big 12 Conference
- South Division
- Record: 8–5 (5–3 Big 12)
- Head coach: Les Miles (2nd season)
- Offensive coordinator: Mike Gundy (3rd season)
- Offensive scheme: Pro spread
- Defensive coordinator: Bill Clay (2nd season)
- Base defense: 3–4
- Home stadium: Lewis Field

2002 Big 12 Conference football standings
	Conf.			Overall
Team	W		L	W		L
North Division
No. 20 Colorado xy	7	–	1	9	–	5
No. 7 Kansas State	6	–	2	11	–	2
Iowa State	4	–	4	7	–	7
Nebraska	3	–	5	7	–	7
Missouri	2	–	6	5	–	7
Kansas	0	–	8	2	–	10
South Division
No. 5 Oklahoma xy$	6	–	2	12	–	2
No. 6 Texas x	6	–	2	11	–	2
Texas Tech	5	–	3	9	–	5
Oklahoma State	5	–	3	8	–	5
Texas A&M	3	–	5	6	–	6
Baylor	1	–	7	3	–	9
Championship: Oklahoma 29, Colorado 7
$ – BCS representative as conference champion; x – Division champion/co-champions; y – Championship game participant; Rankings from AP Poll

The 2002 Oklahoma State Cowboys football team represented Oklahoma State University as a member of the Big 12 Conference during the 2002 NCAA Division I-A football season. Led by second-year head coach Les Miles, the Cowboys compiled an overall record of 8–5 with a mark of 5–3 in conference play, tying for third place in the Big 12's South Division. Oklahoma State was invited to the Houston Bowl, where the Cowboys defeated Southern Miss. The bowl game appearance was only the second for the program in 14 seasons. The team played home games at Lewis Field in Stillwater, Oklahoma.

== Schedule ==
Date	Time	Opponent	Site	TV	Result	Attendance
August 31	7:00 p.m.	at Louisiana Tech*	Independence Stadium; Shreveport, LA		L 36–39	31,391
September 7	6:00 p.m.	No. 2 (I-AA) Northern Iowa*	Lewis Field; Stillwater, OK		W 45–10	40,085
September 14	6:00 p.m.	UCLA*	Lewis Field; Stillwater, OK	FSN	L 24–38	43,020
September 21	6:00 p.m.	SMU*	Lewis Field; Stillwater, OK		W 52–16	41,190
October 5	11:30 a.m.	at No. 2 Texas	Darrell K Royal–Texas Memorial Stadium; Austin, TX	FSN	L 15–17	83,116
October 12	1:10 p.m.	at No. 19 Kansas State	KSU Stadium; Manhattan, KS		L 9–44	48,404
October 19	11:30 a.m.	Nebraska	Lewis Field; Stillwater, OK	FSN	W 24–21	45,017
November 2	11:30 a.m.	Texas A&M^{†}	Lewis Field; Stillwater, OK	FSN	W 28–23	47,607
November 9	1:00 p.m.	at Texas Tech	Jones SBC Stadium; Lubbock, TX		L 24–49	44,595
November 16	1:00 p.m.	at Kansas	Memorial Stadium; Lawrence, KS		W 55–20	27,500
November 23	1:00 p.m.	Baylor	Lewis Field; Stillwater, OK		W 63–28	37,250
November 30	1:30 p.m.	No. 3 Oklahoma	Lewis Field; Stillwater, OK (Bedlam)	FSN	W 38–28	48,500
December 27	1:30 p.m.	vs. Southern Miss*	Reliant Stadium; Houston, TX (Houston Bowl)	ESPN	W 33–23	44,687
*Non-conference game; ^{†}Homecoming; Rankings from AP Poll released prior to the game; All times are in Central time

== Game summaries ==
=== Nebraska ===
Team	1	2	3	4	Total
Cornhuskers	0	7	0	14	21
• Cowboys	0	3	7	14	24

- Date: October 19
- Location: Lewis Field, Stillwater, Oklahoma
- Game attendance: 45,017
- TV announcers (FSN): Bill Land (play-by-play), Gary Reasons (color) & Jim Knox (sideline)
- Source: USA Today

Scoring summary
2	Oklahoma St	Phillips 45-yard field goal	Oklahoma St 3-0
2	Nebraska	Diedrick 2-yard run (Brown kick)	Nebraska 7-3
3	Oklahoma St	Fields 3-yard run (Phillips kick)	Oklahoma St 10-7
4	Oklahoma St	Woods 5-yard pass from Fields (Phillips kick)	Oklahoma St 17-7
4	Nebraska	Horne 2-yard run (Brown kick)	Oklahoma St 17-14
4	Oklahoma St	Lewis 12-yard pass from Fields (Phillips kick)	Oklahoma St 24-14
4	Nebraska	Lord 1-yard run (Brown kick)	Oklahoma St 24-21

Oklahoma State's first win versus Nebraska since 1961.

== Roster ==
2002 Oklahoma State Cowboys football team roster
Players
Coaches
Offense

Pos.	#	Name	Class
QB	13	Josh Fields	So
RB	7	Tatum Bell	Jr
RB	23	Vernand Morency	Fr
WR	82	Rashaun Woods	Jr
WR	84	D'Juan Woods	Fr

Defense

Pos.	#	Name	Class
DT	58	Kevin Williams	Sr
DB	9	Darrent Williams	So

Special teams

Pos.	#	Name	Class

Head coach

- Les Miles

Coordinators/assistant coaches

Legend

- (C) Team captain
- (S) Suspended
- (I) Ineligible
- Injured
- Redshirt

Roster

== Awards and honors ==
- Rashaun Woods, co-MVP, Houston Bowl
- Kevin Williams, co-MVP, Houston Bowl

== Team players in the NFL ==
The following Oklahoma State players were selected in the 2003 NFL draft following the season.

Player	Position	Round	Pick	Franchise
Kevin Williams	Defensive tackle	1	9	Minnesota Vikings

Cowboys Rashaun Woods (31st overall), Tatum Bell (41st overall), and Antonio Smith (135th overall) were selected in the 2004 NFL draft.
