= 2003 Cotton Bowl Classic =

2003 SBC Cotton Bowl Classic
- 67th Cotton Bowl Classic
- The Cotton Bowl in Dallas, Texas, hosted the Cotton Bowl Classic.
Texas Longhorns	LSU Tigers
(10–2)	(8–4)
Big 12	SEC
35	20
Head coach: Mack Brown	Head coach: Nick Saban
AP / Coaches / BCS; 9 / 9 / 10	AP / Coaches / BCS; -- / 25 / --
	1	2	3	4	Total
Texas	7	14	7	7	35
LSU	10	7	0	3	20
- Date: January 1, 2003
- Season: 2002
- Stadium: Cotton Bowl
- Location: Dallas, Texas
- MVP: WR Roy Williams (Texas); DE Cory Redding (Texas)
- Favorite: Texas by 10.5
- Referee: Gerald Wright (Mountain West)

United States TV coverage
- Network: Fox
- Announcers: Thom Brennaman and Charles Davis

The 2003 SBC Cotton Bowl Classic was a post-season college football bowl game between the Texas Longhorns and the LSU Tigers on January 1, 2003, at the Cotton Bowl in Dallas, Texas. It was the final game of the 2002 NCAA Division I-A football season for each team and resulted in a 35–20 Texas victory. Texas represented the Big 12 Conference while LSU represented the Southeastern Conference (SEC).

The University of Texas started out their season strong, and finished well, compiling a 10–2 record: they lost to Oklahoma, 35–24 and the Texas Tech Red Raiders 42–38 while being ranked number 4.

Louisiana State started off their season 6–1. However, an injury to their starting quarterback Matt Mauck caused them to lose their last few games (to Alabama 0–31, Auburn 7–31, and Arkansas 20–21). They finished with an 8–4 regular season record, a disappointing year.

== Scoring summary ==
Scoring summary

Quarter	Time	Drive			Team	Scoring information	Score	
Quarter	Time	Plays	Yards	TOP	Team	Scoring information	Longhons	Tigers
1	10:44	10	71		Tigers	26-yard field goal by John Corbello	0	3
1	3:49				Longhorns	Fumble recovery returned 46 yards for touchdown by Lee Jackson, Dusty Mangum kick good	7	3
1	0:04	10	87		Tigers	LaBrandon Toefield 20-yard touchdown reception from Marcus Randall, Corbello kick good	7	10
2	12:04	4	90		Tigers	Domanick Davis 10-yard touchdown run, Corbello kick good	7	17
2	11:24	2	74		Longhorns	Roy Williams 51-yard touchdown reception from Chris Simms, Mangum kick good	14	17
2	3:11	4	80		Longhorns	Cedric Benson 1-yard touchdown run, Mangum kick good	21	17
3	4:08	4	80		Longhorns	Williams 39-yard touchdown run, Mangum kick good	28	17
4	9:58	7	47		Longhorns	Ivan Williams 8-yard touchdown reception from Simms, Mangum kick good	35	17
4	7:41	8	27		Tigers	39-yard field goal by Corbello	35	20
"TOP" = time of possession. For other American football terms, see Glossary of American football.							35	20
