= 2002 Iowa State Cyclones football team =

American college football season

2002 Iowa State Cyclones football

Humanitarian Bowl, L 16–34 vs. Boise State
- Conference: Big 12 Conference
- North Division
- Record: 7–7 (4–4 Big 12)
- Head coach: Dan McCarney (8th season)
- Offensive coordinator: Steve Brickey (1st season)
- Offensive scheme: Pro-style
- Defensive coordinator: John Skladany (6th season)
- Base defense: 4–3
- Home stadium: Jack Trice Stadium

2002 Big 12 Conference football standings
	Conf.			Overall
Team	W		L	W		L
North Division
No. 20 Colorado xy	7	–	1	9	–	5
No. 7 Kansas State	6	–	2	11	–	2
Iowa State	4	–	4	7	–	7
Nebraska	3	–	5	7	–	7
Missouri	2	–	6	5	–	7
Kansas	0	–	8	2	–	10
South Division
No. 5 Oklahoma xy$	6	–	2	12	–	2
No. 6 Texas x	6	–	2	11	–	2
Texas Tech	5	–	3	9	–	5
Oklahoma State	5	–	3	8	–	5
Texas A&M	3	–	5	6	–	6
Baylor	1	–	7	3	–	9
Championship: Oklahoma 29, Colorado 7
$ – BCS representative as conference champion; x – Division champion/co-champions; y – Championship game participant; Rankings from AP Poll

The 2002 Iowa State Cyclones football team represented Iowa State University as a member of the North Division in the Big 12 Conference during the 2002 NCAA Division I-A football season. Led by eighth-year head coach Dan McCarney, the Cyclones compiled an overall record of 7–7 with a mark of 4–4 in conference play, placing third in the Big 12's North Division. Iowa State was invited to the Humanitarian Bowl, where the Cyclones lost to Boise State. The team played home games at Jack Trice Stadium in Ames, Iowa.

== Schedule ==
Date	Time	Opponent	Rank	Site	TV	Result	Attendance
August 24	7:30 p.m.	vs. No. 3 Florida State*		Arrowhead Stadium; Kansas City, MO (Eddie Robinson Classic)	FSN	L 31–38	55,132
August 31	11:30 a.m.	Kansas		Jack Trice Stadium; Ames, IA	FSN	W 45–3	40,026
September 7	6:00 p.m.	Tennessee Tech*		Jack Trice Stadium; Ames, IA		W 58–6	40,155
September 14	5:00 p.m.	at Iowa*		Kinnick Stadium; Iowa City, IA (rivalry)	ESPN2	W 36–31	70,397
September 21	6:00 p.m.	Troy State*	No. 21	Jack Trice Stadium; Ames, IA		W 42–12	44,896
September 28	2:30 p.m.	No. 20 Nebraska	No. 19	Jack Trice Stadium; Ames, IA (rivalry)	ABC	W 36–14	51,888
October 12	6:00 p.m.	Texas Tech^{†}	No. 11	Jack Trice Stadium; Ames, IA	TBS	W 31–17	51,842
October 19	2:30 p.m.	at No. 2 Oklahoma	No. 9	Oklahoma Memorial Stadium; Norman, OK	ABC	L 3–49	75,201
October 26	2:30 p.m.	at No. 7 Texas	No. 17	Darrell K Royal–Texas Memorial Stadium; Austin, TX	ABC	L 10–21	83,071
November 2	1:00 p.m.	Missouri	No. 22	Jack Trice Stadium; Ames, IA (rivalry)		W 42–35	44,339
November 9	6:00 p.m.	at No. 12 Kansas State	No. 21	KSU Stadium; Manhattan, KS (rivalry)	TBS	L 7–58	49,504
November 16	6:00 p.m.	at No. 17 Colorado		Folsom Field; Boulder, CO	FSN	L 27–41	48,728
November 23	1:00 p.m.	Connecticut*		Jack Trice Stadium; Ames, IA		L 20–37	34,582
December 31	11:00 a.m.	vs. No. 18 Boise State*		Bronco Stadium; Boise, ID (Humanitarian Bowl)	ESPN	L 16–34	30,446
*Non-conference game; ^{†}Homecoming; Rankings from AP Poll released prior to the game; All times are in Central time

== Rankings ==
Ranking movements Legend: ██ Increase in ranking ██ Decrease in ranking — = Not ranked RV = Received votes
	Week																	
Poll	Pre	1	2	3	4	5	6	7	8	9	10	11	12	13	14	15	16	Final
AP	—	RV	RV	RV	21	19	15	11	9	17	22	21	RV	RV	—	—	—	—
Coaches	RV	RV	RV	RV	24	21	18	14	13	18	23	22	RV	RV	—	—	—	—
BCS	Not released									—	—	—	—	—	—	—	—	Not released

== Games summaries ==
=== Vs. Florida State ===
#3 Florida State vs. Iowa State

Team	1	2	3	4	Total
• #3 Seminoles	17	14	0	7	38
Cyclones	0	14	3	14	31

- Date: August 24
- Location: Arrowhead Stadium, Kansas City, Missouri
- Game start: 7:30 p.m. CDT
- Game attendance: 55,132
- TV announcers (FSN): Joel Meyers (play-by-play), Kellen Winslow (color), Artie Gigantino (color), & Eric Clemons (sideline)

Scoring summary
1	9:11	FSU	Nick Maddox 5-yard run (Xavier Beitia kick)	FSU 7-0
1	6:29	FSU	Alonzo Jackson 48-yard interception return (Beitia, kick)	FSU 14-0
1	1:21	FSU	Beitia 35-yard field goal	FSU 17-0
2	14:54	FSU	Anquan Boldin 2-yard pass from Chris Rix (Beitia kick)	FSU 24-0
2	14:03	ISU	Hiawatha Rutland 36-yard run (Adam Benike kick)	FSU 24-7
2	1:05	FSU	Greg Jones 9-yard run (Beitia kick)	FSU 31-7
2	0:09	ISU	Kyle Knock 29-yard pass from Seneca Wallace (Benike kick)	FSU 31-14
3	1:23	ISU	Benike 33-yard field goal	FSU 31-17
4	13:01	ISU	Wallace 1-yard run (Adam Benike kick)	FSU 31-24
4	8:15	FSU	Boldin 31-yard pass from Rix (Beitia kick)	FSU 38-24
4	5:26	ISU	Jamaul Montgomery 39-yard pass from Wallace (Benike kick)	FSU 38-31

=== At Iowa ===
Iowa State at Iowa
Cy-Hawk Game

Team	1	2	3	4	Total
• Cyclones	7	0	23	6	36
Hawkeyes	7	17	0	7	31

- Date: September 14
- Location: Kinnick Stadium, Iowa City, Iowa
- Game start: 5:05 p.m. CDT
- Game attendance: 70,397
- TV announcers (ESPN2): Dave Barnett, Mike Golic, Bill Curry, Michele Tafoya
- Source: Box Score Archived 2016-11-13 at the Wayback Machine

Scoring summary
1	Iowa	Fred Russell 46-yard run (Nate Kaeding kick)	Iowa 7-0
1	Iowa St	Hiawatha Rutland 6-yard run (Adam Benike kick)	Tied 7-7
2	Iowa	Nate Kaeding 40-yard field goal	Iowa 10-7
2	Iowa	Mo Brown 50-yard pass from Brad Banks (Nate Kaeding kick)	Iowa 17-7
2	Iowa	Jermelle Lewis 10-yard run (Nate Kaeding kick)	Iowa 24-7
3	Iowa St	Seneca Wallace 5-yard run (Adam Benike kick)	Iowa 24-14
3	Iowa St	Jamaul Montgomery 7-yard pass from Seneca Wallace (Adam Benike kick)	Iowa 24-21
3	Iowa St	Joe Woodley 1-yard run (Adam Benike kick)	Iowa St 28-24
3	Iowa St	Safety	Iowa St 30-24
4	Iowa St	Adam Benike 36-yard field goal	Iowa St 33-24
4	Iowa St	Adam Benike 38-yard field goal	Iowa St 36-24
4	Iowa	Mo Brown 20-yard pass from Brad Banks (Nate Kaeding kick)	Iowa St 36-31

=== Nebraska ===
#20 Nebraska at #19 Iowa State

Team	1	2	3	4	Total
#20 Cornhuskers	0	7	7	0	14
• #19 Cyclones	3	16	7	10	36

- Date: September 28
- Location: Jack Trice Stadium, Ames, Iowa
- Game start: 2:37 p.m. CST
- Game attendance: 51,888
- TV announcers (ABC): Brent Musburger (play-by-play), Gary Danielson (color), & Jack Arute (sideline)

Iowa State's dominant victory over Nebraska forced the Cornhuskers out of the AP poll for the first time since October 5, 1981 – an NCAA-record streak of 348 consecutive polls.

=== Texas Tech ===
Texas Tech at #11 Iowa State

Team	1	2	3	4	Total
Red Raiders	3	0	7	7	17
• #11 Cyclones	3	0	21	7	31

- Date: October 12
- Location: Jack Trice Stadium, Ames, Iowa
- Game start: 7:00 CDT
- Game attendance: 51,842
- TV announcers (TBS): Ron Thulin, Charles Davis, Craig Sager, Erin Andrews

=== At Oklahoma ===
#9 Iowa State at #2 Oklahoma

Team	1	2	3	4	Total
#9 Cyclones	0	0	3	0	3
• #2 Sooners	14	21	7	7	49

- Date: October 19
- Location: Gaylord Family Oklahoma Memorial Stadium, Norman, Oklahoma
- Game start: 2:30 p.m. CST
- Elapsed time: 3:13
- Game attendance: 75,201
- Referee: John Laurie
- TV announcers (ABC): Brad Nessler (play–by–play), Bob Griese (color), & Lynn Swann (sideline)

=== At Texas ===
#17 Iowa State at #7 Texas

Team	1	2	3	4	Total
Cyclones	0	10	0	0	10
• #7 Longhorns	7	0	7	7	21

- Date: October 26
- Location: Darrell K Royal–Texas Memorial Stadium, Austin, Texas
- Game start: 3:30
- Game attendance: 83,071
- TV announcers (ABC): Tim Brant, Ed Cunningham, Sam Ryan

=== at No. 12 Kansas State ===
Iowa State at Kansas State

Team	1	2	3	4	Total
No. 21 Cyclones	7	0	0	0	7
• No. 12 Wildcats	13	17	28	0	58

- Date: November 9
- Location: KSU Stadium, Manhattan, Kansas
- Game start: 7:00
- Game attendance: 49,504
- Referee: Cooper Castleberry
- TV announcers (TBS): Ron Thulin, Charles Davis, Craig Sager, and Erin Andrews

=== at No. 17 Colorado ===
Iowa State at Colorado

Team	1	2	3	4	Total
Cyclones	7	7	6	7	27
• No. 17 Buffaloes	3	14	3	21	41

- Date: November 16
- Location: Folsom Field, Boulder, CO
- Game start: 5:00 p.m. MST
- Game attendance: 48,728
- TV announcers (FSN): Bill Land (play-by-play), Gary Reasons (color), & Zach Klein (sideline)

Scoring summary
1	COL	Patrick Brougham 44-yard field goal	Colorado 3–0
1	ISU	Michael Wagner 5-yard run (Adam Benike kick)	Iowa St 7–3
2	COL	D.J. Hackett 8-yard pass from Robert Hodge (Patrick Brougham kick)	Colorado 10–7
2	ISU	Lance Young 50-yard pass from Seneca Wallace (Adam Benike kick)	Iowa St 14–10
2	COL	Chris Brown 5-yard run (Patrick Brougham kick)	Colorado 17–14
3	ISU	Joe Woodley 1-yard run (kick failed)	Iowa St 20–17
3	COL	Patrick Brougham 41-yard field goal	Tied 20–20
4	COL	Derek McCoy 7-yard pass from Robert Hodge (Patrick Brougham kick)	Colorado 27–20
4	COL	Medford Moorer 71-yard fumble return (Patrick Brougham kick)	Colorado 34–20
4	ISU	Seneca Wallace 6-yard run (Adam Benike kick)	Colorado 34–27
4	COL	Bobby Purify 6-yard run (Patrick Brougham kick)	Colorado 41–27

== Roster ==
2002 Iowa State Cyclones football team roster
Players
Coaches
Offense

Pos.	#	Name	Class
OL	68	Zach Butler	Sr
WR	82	Lane Danielsen	Jr
QB	8	Austin Flynn	Fr
OL	69	Dwayne Johnson	Sr
WR	22	T. J. Klith	Fr
TE	93	Kyle Knock	Sr
QB	16	Chris Love	So
OL	65	Bob Montgomery	Jr
WR	83	Jamaul Montgomery	Jr
RB	12	Hiawatha Rutland	Jr
OL	71	Casey Shelton	Jr
OL	53	Cale Stubbe	So
QB	3	Kyle Van Winkle	Fr
RB	4	Michael Wagner	Jr
QB	15	Seneca Wallace	Sr
WR	26	Jack Whitver	Jr
FB	45	Joe Woodley	Jr

Defense

Pos.	#	Name	Class
DB	21	Atif Austin	Sr
LB	33	Brandon Brown	So
DL	92	Jordan Carstens	Jr
DT	93	Jon Calease	Fr
DL	55	Beau Coleman	Sr
DB	17	Anthony Forrest	So
DB	11	Ellis Hobbs	So
LB	41	Jeremy Loyd	Sr
DB	3	Bryan Ollie	Jr
DL	70	Jared Otto	Jr
DL	1	Tyson Smith	So
DL	91	Tim TeBrink	So
DB	18	Marc Timmons	Jr
LB	7	Matt Word	Sr

Special teams

Pos.	#	Name	Class
K	49	Adam Benike	Jr
K	14	Tony Yelk	So

Head coach

- Dan McCarney

Coordinators/assistant coaches

Legend

- (C) Team captain
- (S) Suspended
- (I) Ineligible
- Injured
- Redshirt

Roster
Last update: 2018-04-17

== Awards and honors ==
On November 30, eight Iowa State players were named to the all-Big 12 football teams. Second-team players were Offensive lineman Bob Montgomery, quarterback Seneca Wallace, place-kicker Adam Benike and defensive tackle Jordan Carstens. The third-team consisted of offensive lineman Zach Butler and strong safety JaMaine Billups. Wide receiver Lane Danielsen and linebacker Jeremy Loyd were honorable mention choices. On December 2, 2002 defensive tackle Jordan Carstens and wide receiver Jack Whitver were named to the Verizon Academic All-America Football Teams. They earned first and second team honors respectively. Iowa State was also only one of eight teams with more than one player recognized.
