= 2002 Texas Longhorns football team =

American college football season

2002 Texas Longhorns football

Big 12 South co-champion Cotton Bowl Classic champion

Cotton Bowl Classic, W 35–20 vs. LSU
- Conference: Big 12 Conference
- South Division

Ranking
- Coaches: No. 7
- AP: No. 6
- Record: 11–2 (6–2 Big 12)
- Head coach: Mack Brown (5th season)
- Offensive coordinator: Greg Davis (5th season)
- Offensive scheme: Spread
- Defensive coordinator: Carl Reese (5th season)
- Home stadium: Darrell K Royal–Texas Memorial Stadium (Capacity: 80,092)

2002 Big 12 Conference football standings
	Conf.			Overall
Team	W		L	W		L
North Division
No. 20 Colorado xy	7	–	1	9	–	5
No. 7 Kansas State	6	–	2	11	–	2
Iowa State	4	–	4	7	–	7
Nebraska	3	–	5	7	–	7
Missouri	2	–	6	5	–	7
Kansas	0	–	8	2	–	10
South Division
No. 5 Oklahoma xy$	6	–	2	12	–	2
No. 6 Texas x	6	–	2	11	–	2
Texas Tech	5	–	3	9	–	5
Oklahoma State	5	–	3	8	–	5
Texas A&M	3	–	5	6	–	6
Baylor	1	–	7	3	–	9
Championship: Oklahoma 29, Colorado 7
$ – BCS representative as conference champion; x – Division champion/co-champions; y – Championship game participant; Rankings from AP Poll

The 2002 Texas Longhorns football team represented the University of Texas at Austin in the 2002 NCAA Division I-A football season. The team was coached by head football coach Mack Brown and led on the field by senior quarterback Chris Simms.

== Schedule ==
Date	Time	Opponent	Rank	Site	TV	Result	Attendance
August 31	7:00 p.m.	North Texas*	No. 3	Darrell K Royal–Texas Memorial Stadium; Austin, TX	PPV	W 27–0	83,051
September 14	7:00 p.m.	at North Carolina*	No. 3	Kenan Memorial Stadium; Chapel Hill, NC	ABC	W 52–21	60,500
September 21	8:00 p.m.	Houston*	No. 3	Darrell K Royal–Texas Memorial Stadium; Austin, TX	PPV	W 41–11	82,936
September 28	2:30 p.m.	at Tulane*	No. 3	Louisiana Superdome; New Orleans, LA	ESPN	W 49–0	46,678
October 5	11:30 a.m.	Oklahoma State	No. 2	Darrell K Royal–Texas Memorial Stadium; Austin, TX	FSN	W 17–15	83,116
October 12	2:30 p.m.	vs. No. 2 Oklahoma	No. 3	Cotton Bowl; Dallas, TX (Red River Shootout, College GameDay)	ABC	L 24–35	75,587
October 19	6:00 p.m.	at No. 17 Kansas State	No. 8	KSU Stadium; Manhattan, KS	FSN	W 17–14	50,659
October 26	2:30 p.m.	No. 17 Iowa State	No. 7	Darrell K Royal–Texas Memorial Stadium; Austin, TX	ABC	W 21–10	83,071
November 2	6:00 p.m.	at Nebraska	No. 7	Memorial Stadium; Lincoln, NE	FSN	W 27–24	78,268
November 9	11:30 a.m.	Baylor	No. 4	Darrell K Royal–Texas Memorial Stadium; Austin, TX (rivalry)	PPV	W 41–0	83,016
November 16	2:30 p.m.	at Texas Tech	No. 4	Jones SBC Stadium; Lubbock, TX (rivalry)	ABC	L 38–42	52,047
November 29	11:00 a.m.	Texas A&M	No. 10	Darrell K Royal–Texas Memorial Stadium; Austin, TX (rivalry)	ABC	W 50–20	83,711
January 1, 2003	10:00 a.m.	vs. LSU*	No. 9	Cotton Bowl; Dallas, TX (Cotton Bowl Classic)	FOX	W 35–20	70,817
*Non-conference game; Rankings from AP Poll released prior to the game; All times are in Central time

== Game summaries ==
=== North Texas ===
Team	1	2	3	4	Total
North Texas	0	0	0	0	0
• Texas	14	13	0	0	27

- Date: August 31
- Location: Darrell K Royal–Texas Memorial Stadium
- Game start: 8:00
- TV announcers (Fox Sports PPV): Bill Land, Spike Dykes, Gary Reasons, Kevin Eschenfelder

=== North Carolina ===
Team	1	2	3	4	Total
• Texas	10	14	7	21	52
North Carolina	0	7	7	7	21

- Date: September 14
- Location: Kenan Memorial Stadium
- Game start: 8:00
- TV announcers (ABC): Sean McDonough, David Norrie

Mack Brown's first game back at North Carolina since taking the Texas job.

=== Houston ===
Team	1	2	3	4	Total
Houston	0	3	0	8	11
• Texas	14	17	0	10	41

- Date: September 21
- Location: Darrell K Royal–Texas Memorial Stadium
- Game start: 8:00
- TV announcers (FSN PPV): Bill Land, Gary Reasons, Jim Knox

=== Tulane ===
Team	1	2	3	4	Total
• Texas	7	7	14	21	49
Tulane	0	0	0	0	0

- Date: September 28
- Location: Louisiana Superdome
- Game start: 3:30
- TV announcers (ESPN+): Doug Bell, Merril Hoge

=== Oklahoma St ===
Team	1	2	3	4	Total
Oklahoma St	3	0	6	6	15
• Texas	0	10	7	0	17

- Date: October 5
- Location: Darrell K Royal–Texas Memorial Stadium
- Game start: 12:30
- TV announcers (FSN): Bill Land, Gary Reasons, Jim Knox

=== Oklahoma ===
Team	1	2	3	4	Total
Texas	7	7	3	7	24
• Oklahoma	3	8	3	21	35

- Date: October 12
- Location: Cotton Bowl
- Game start: 3:30
- TV announcers (ABC): Brent Musburger, Gary Danielson, Jack Arute

=== Kansas St ===
Team	1	2	3	4	Total
• Texas	0	7	7	3	17
Kansas St	0	6	0	8	14

- Date: October 19
- Location: KSU Stadium
- Game start: 7:00
- TV announcers (FSN): Joel Meyers, Dave Lapham, Jim Knox

=== Iowa St ===
Team	1	2	3	4	Total
Iowa St	0	10	0	0	10
• Texas	7	0	7	7	21

- Date: October 26
- Location: Darrell K Royal–Texas Memorial Stadium
- Game start: 3:30
- TV announcers (ABC): Tim Brant, Ed Cunningham, Sam Ryan

=== Nebraska ===
Team	1	2	3	4	Total
• Texas	3	3	14	7	27
Nebraska	3	0	7	14	24

- Date: November 2
- Location: Memorial Stadium
- Game start: 7:00
- TV announcers (FSN): Joel Meyers, Dave Lapham, Jim Knox

=== Baylor ===
Team	1	2	3	4	Total
Baylor	0	0	0	0	0
• Texas	14	17	3	7	41

- Date: November 9
- Location: Darrell K Royal–Texas Memorial Stadium
- Game start: 12:30
- TV announcers (FSN PPV): Kevin Eschenfelder, Spike Dykes, Brian Anderson

=== Texas Tech ===
Team	1	2	3	4	Total
Texas	14	7	7	10	38
• Texas Tech	0	21	7	14	42

- Date: November 16
- Location: Jones SBC Stadium
- Game start: 3:30
- TV announcers (ABC): Brad Nessler, Bob Griese, Lynn Swann

=== Texas A&M ===
Team	1	2	3	4	Total
Texas A&M	7	0	7	6	20
• Texas	9	14	7	20	50

- Date: November 29
- Location: Darrell K Royal–Texas Memorial Stadium
- Game start: 12:00
- Game attendance: 83,711
- TV announcers (ABC): Tim Brant, Ed Cunningham, Sam Ryan
- Chris Simms 278 Yds, 3 TD (finished 15–0 at home as starting QB)

=== Cotton Bowl ===
Team	1	2	3	4	Total
• Texas	7	14	7	7	35
LSU	10	7	0	3	20

- Date: January 1
- Location: Cotton Bowl
- Game start: 11:00
- TV announcers (Fox): Thom Brennaman, Tim Green, Ron Pitts, Brian Baldinger

== Roster ==
2002 Texas Longhorns football team roster
Players
Coaches
Offense

Pos.	#	Name	Class
C	72	Will Allen	Fr
RB	32	Cedric Benson	So
TE	80	Bo Scaife	So
QB	2	Chris Simms	Sr
WR	4	Roy Williams	Jr

Defense

Pos.	#	Name	Class
LB	11	Derrick Johnson	So
DE	40	Cory Redding	Sr

Special teams

Pos.	#	Name	Class

Head coach

- Mack Brown

Coordinators/assistant coaches

Legend

- (C) Team captain
- (S) Suspended
- (I) Ineligible
- Injured
- Redshirt

Roster
Last update: 2002-10-14
