= 2002 Big 12 Championship Game =

- Conference Championship
Colorado Buffaloes	Oklahoma Sooners
(9–3)	(10–2)
7	29
Head coach: Gary Barnett	Head coach: Bob Stoops
AP / Coaches / BCS; 12 / 14 / 12	AP / Coaches / BCS; 8 / 9 / 7
	1	2	3	4	Total
Colorado	0	0	0	7	7
Oklahoma	7	6	6	10	29
- Date: December 7, 2002
- Season: 2002
- Stadium: Reliant Stadium
- Location: Houston, Texas
- Referee: Jon Bible
- Attendance: 63,332

United States TV coverage
- Network: ABC
- Announcers: Brent Musburger and Gary Danielson

2002 Big 12 Conference football standings
	Conf.			Overall
Team	W		L	W		L
North Division
No. 20 Colorado xy	7	–	1	9	–	5
No. 7 Kansas State	6	–	2	11	–	2
Iowa State	4	–	4	7	–	7
Nebraska	3	–	5	7	–	7
Missouri	2	–	6	5	–	7
Kansas	0	–	8	2	–	10
South Division
No. 5 Oklahoma xy$	6	–	2	12	–	2
No. 6 Texas x	6	–	2	11	–	2
Texas Tech	5	–	3	9	–	5
Oklahoma State	5	–	3	8	–	5
Texas A&M	3	–	5	6	–	6
Baylor	1	–	7	3	–	9
Championship: Oklahoma 29, Colorado 7
$ – BCS representative as conference champion; x – Division champion/co-champions; y – Championship game participant; Rankings from AP Poll

The 2002 Big 12 Championship Game was a college football game played on Saturday, December 7, 2002, at Reliant Stadium in Houston. This was the 7th Big 12 Championship Game and determined the 2002 champion of the Big 12 Conference. The game featured the Colorado Buffaloes, champions of the North division, and the Oklahoma Sooners, champions of the South division. Both teams had faced each other earlier in the regular season, with the Sooners defeating the Buffaloes 27–11. Oklahoma would win the rematch 29–7 and gained their second Big 12 title in three years.

== Game summary ==
2002 Big 12 Championship Game

Quarter	1	2	3	4	Total
No. 12 Colorado	0	0	0	7	7
No. 8 Oklahoma	7	6	6	10	29

at Reliant Stadium • Houston, Texas

- Date: December 7, 2002
- Game time: 7:00 p.m. CST
- TV announcers (ABC): Brent Musburger and Gary Danielson
- Big 12 game summary

Game information

First quarter
Second quarter
Third quarter
Fourth quarter

=== Statistics ===
Statistics	COL	OKL
First downs	9	25
Plays–yards		
Rushes–yards		
Passing yards		
Passing: comp–att–int		
Time of possession	21:57	38:03

Team	Category	Player	Statistics
Colorado	Passing		
Colorado	Rushing		
Colorado	Receiving		
Oklahoma	Passing		
Oklahoma	Rushing		
Oklahoma	Receiving		
