= Kevin Steele =

American football player and coach

Biographical details
- Born: March 17, 1958 (age 68); Dillon, South Carolina, U.S.

Playing career
- 1976: Furman
- 1978–1979: Tennessee
- Position: Linebacker

Coaching career (HC unless noted)
- 1980: Tennessee (SA)
- 1980–1981: Tennessee (GA)
- 1982: Tennessee (OLB)
- 1983: New Mexico State (LB)
- 1984–1986: Oklahoma State (LB/TE)
- 1987–1988: Tennessee (DB)
- 1989–1994: Nebraska (LB)
- 1995–1998: Carolina Panthers (LB)
- 1999–2002: Baylor
- 2003–2006: Florida State (LB)
- 2007: Alabama (DC)
- 2008: Alabama (DHC/ILB)
- 2009–2011: Clemson (DC/LB)
- 2013: Alabama (director player personnel)
- 2014: Alabama (LB)
- 2015: LSU (DC/LB)
- 2016–2020: Auburn (DC)
- 2020: Auburn (interim HC/DC)
- 2022: Miami (FL) (DC)
- 2023: Alabama (DC)

Head coaching record
- Overall: 9–37
- Bowls: 0–1

Kevin Steele (born March 17, 1958) is an American former football coach and player. Steele has previously worked as defensive coordinator at Miami, Auburn, LSU, Clemson, and Alabama. From 1999 to 2002, Steele served as the head football coach at Baylor University, compiling a record of 9–36 overall and 1–31 in the Big 12 Conference.

== Playing career ==
Steele played three seasons of collegiate football as a linebacker. He spent his freshman year at Furman University before transferring to Tennessee, where he was a member of Johnny Majors' 1978 and 1979 squads.

== Coaching career ==
=== Career as an assistant ===
From 1989 to 1994, Steele coached the linebackers under Nebraska legend Tom Osborne. During his six years in Lincoln, the Cornhuskers went 60–11, appeared in six bowl games, won four conference championships and captured the 1994 national championship with a 13–0 record. He coached Butkus Award winner Trev Alberts during that time. He was also an assistant coach at Florida State University, University of Tennessee, Oklahoma State University and New Mexico State University. On January 4, 2007, Steele was hired by new Alabama coach Nick Saban as defensive coordinator for the Crimson Tide. In 2009, Steele went on to be the DC for the Clemson Tigers for 3 seasons, before returning to Alabama as a defensive assistant in 2013. After the 2014 season, Steele was hired by then Louisiana State University head coach Les Miles as defensive coordinator. Following the 2015 season, he was hired by then Auburn Tigers head football coach Gus Malzahn as defensive coordinator. Following the firing of Malzahn in 2020, Steele was not retained, thus bringing his stint with the Auburn Tigers to a close.

=== Carolina Panthers ===
In 1995, Steele moved to the NFL as the linebackers coach for the Carolina Panthers. Under head coach Dom Capers, the Panthers reached the NFC Championship Game in their second season (1996).

A well publicized moment occurred during Steele's last year in Carolina. Linebacker Kevin Greene attacked Steele during a heated discussion, grabbing the coach by his clothing. The incident was captured on live television. Steele did not retaliate.

"Football is an emotional, aggressive game," Steele said. "Those guys are out there fighting. Kevin is a good person. We've talked about it and worked it out. That's all I have to say about it."

=== Head coaching career ===
Steele succeeded Dave Roberts as the head coach at Baylor University from 1999 to 2002. His record was 9–36 (1–31 in the Big 12 conference).

In Steele's first season (1999), Baylor finished with a 1–10 record (the school's worst since 1969). During the 1999 season, Steele's Baylor team was involved in what ESPN.com called one of the top 10 worst coaching decisions. The decision came when he chose a running play rather than a kneel down with Baylor leading and possessing the ball in the game's final 12 seconds and their opponent, the UNLV Rebels, was out of time outs. The ensuing Baylor fumble and UNLV return for a touchdown gave the Rebels a shocking win.

Steele's second season began with a 2–1 non-conference record but was followed by eight straight Big 12 losses, only one closer than 24 points. A particularly rough stretch in October saw the Bears shut out in three consecutive games (the last of which was a 59–0 loss at Nebraska, where the Huskers led 38–0 after the first quarter). Part of BU's offensive woes were caused by the season ending collarbone injury to heralded offseason JUCO transfer quarterback Greg Cicero, who was injured in the season's second game. Steele's third season in 2001 started with a 2–0 record (including an exciting overtime win over New Mexico), but the Bears won only one more game to finish 3–8.

Steele's fourth season (2002) had a terrible beginning. For opening day, Baylor traveled to Berkeley to play California. Since Cal had finished 1–10 the previous year, many felt this was a good matchup. However, Cal (who turned out to be greatly improved in 2002) immediately took command of the game, jumping to a 35–0 lead and cruising to a 70–22 win. Although the team rallied from the defeat to win three of the next four games (the last a 35–32 win over Kansas for Steele's first Big 12 conference win), they could not sustain the momentum, losing their next four conference games by wide margins and Steele was fired after the fourth (a 62–11 loss to Texas Tech). After the firing, Steele elected to finish the season and continued as head coach for the season's last three games, all losses. Steele was succeeded by coach Guy Morriss.

=== Return to Alabama ===
On February 5, 2023, Nick Saban hired Steele as the defensive coordinator for the Crimson Tide. It was Steele's third stint at Alabama. On January 8, 2024, Steele retired from coaching.

== Family ==
Steele is a native of Dillon, South Carolina. He and his wife, Linda, have a son (Gordon) and a daughter (Caroline). Gordon Steele is the offensive line coach at South Alabama and has also coached at Alabama and Murray State.

== Head coaching record ==
Year	Team	Overall	Conference	Standing	Bowl/playoffs
Baylor Bears (Big 12 Conference) (1999–2002)
1999	Baylor	1–10	0–8	6th (South)	
2000	Baylor	2–9	0–8	6th (South)	
2001	Baylor	3–8	0–8	6th (South)	
2002	Baylor	3–9	1–7	6th (South)	
Baylor:		9–36	1–31		
Auburn Tigers (Southeastern Conference) (2020)
2020	Auburn	0–1	0–0		L Citrus
Auburn:		0–1	0–0		
Total:		9–37			
