= 2002 Troy State Trojans football team =

American college football season

2002 Troy State Trojans football
- Conference: Independent
- Record: 4–8
- Head coach: Larry Blakeney (12th season)
- Offensive coordinator: John Shannon (2nd season)
- Offensive scheme: Spread
- Defensive coordinator: Wayne Bolt (6th season)
- Base defense: 4–3
- Home stadium: Veterans Memorial Stadium

2002 NCAA Division I-A independents football records
	Conf.			Overall
Team	W		L	W		L
South Florida		–		9	–	2
No. 17 Notre Dame		–		10	–	3
Connecticut		–		6	–	6
Utah State		–		4	–	7
Troy State		–		4	–	8
Navy		–		2	–	10
Rankings from AP Poll

The 2002 Troy State Trojans football team represented Troy State University—now known as Troy University—as an independent during the 2002 NCAA Division I-A football season. Led by 12th-year head coach Larry Blakeney, the Trojans compiled a record of 4–8. Troy State played home games at Veterans Memorial Stadium in Troy, Alabama.

== Schedule ==
Date	Opponent	Site	TV	Result	Attendance	Source
August 31	at No. 9 Nebraska	Memorial Stadium; Lincoln, NE		L 16–31	77,831	
September 7	at UAB	Legion Field; Birmingham, AL		L 26–27	22,203	
September 14	Southern Utah	Veterans Memorial Stadium; Troy, AL		W 40–15	15,288	
September 21	at No. 21 Iowa State	Jack Trice Stadium; Ames, IA		L 12–42	44,896	
September 28	at Missouri	Faurot Field; Columbia, MO		L 7–44	50,220	
October 5	Austin Peay	Veterans Memorial Stadium; Troy, AL		W 41–3	13,510	
October 12	at Mississippi State	Davis Wade Stadium; Starkville, MS		L 8–11	49,546	
October 19	at Marshall	Marshall University Stadium; Huntington, WV	ESPN Plus	L 7–24	27,121	
October 26	Florida Atlantic^{†}	Veterans Memorial Stadium; Troy, AL		W 21–6	12,465	
November 2	at Arkansas	War Memorial Stadium; Little Rock, AR	ESPN Regional	L 0–23	42,817	
November 9	vs. No. 24 (I-AA) Florida A&M	Ladd–Peebles Stadium; Mobile, AL (Azalea City Classic)		W 24–7	13,894	
November 16	Utah State	Veterans Memorial Stadium; Troy, AL		L 16–19 ^{OT}	12,348	
^{†}Homecoming; Rankings from AP Poll released prior to the game
