= 2002 Kansas Jayhawks football team =

American college football season

2002 Kansas Jayhawks football
- Conference: Big 12 Conference
- North
- Record: 2–10 (0–8 Big 12)
- Head coach: Mark Mangino (1st season)
- Offensive coordinator: Nick Quartaro (1st season)
- Defensive coordinator: Bill Young (1st season)
- Home stadium: Memorial Stadium (Capacity: 50,250)

2002 Big 12 Conference football standings
	Conf.			Overall
Team	W		L	W		L
North Division
No. 20 Colorado xy	7	–	1	9	–	5
No. 7 Kansas State	6	–	2	11	–	2
Iowa State	4	–	4	7	–	7
Nebraska	3	–	5	7	–	7
Missouri	2	–	6	5	–	7
Kansas	0	–	8	2	–	10
South Division
No. 5 Oklahoma xy$	6	–	2	12	–	2
No. 6 Texas x	6	–	2	11	–	2
Texas Tech	5	–	3	9	–	5
Oklahoma State	5	–	3	8	–	5
Texas A&M	3	–	5	6	–	6
Baylor	1	–	7	3	–	9
Championship: Oklahoma 29, Colorado 7
$ – BCS representative as conference champion; x – Division champion/co-champions; y – Championship game participant; Rankings from AP Poll

The 2002 Kansas Jayhawks football team represented the University of Kansas in the 2002 NCAA Division I-A football season. They participated as members of the Big 12 Conference in the North Division. They were coached by head coach Mark Mangino and played their home games at Memorial Stadium in Lawrence, Kansas.

== Schedule ==
Date	Time	Opponent	Site	TV	Result	Attendance	Source
August 31	11:30 a.m.	at Iowa State	Jack Trice Stadium; Ames, IA	FSN	L 3–45	40,026	
September 7	9:00 p.m.	at UNLV*	Sam Boyd Stadium; Whitney, NV		L 20–31	25,109	
September 14	6:00 p.m.	Southwest Missouri State*	Memorial Stadium; Lawrence, KS		W 44–24	40,500	
September 21	6:00 p.m.	Bowling Green*	Memorial Stadium; Lawrence, KS		L 16–39	37,000	
September 28	6:00 p.m.	at Tulsa*	Skelly Stadium; Tulsa, OK		W 43–33	17,893	
October 5	1:00 p.m.	at Baylor	Floyd Casey Stadium; Waco, TX		L 32–35	22,103	
October 12	1:00 p.m.	Colorado^{†}	Memorial Stadium; Lawrence, KS		L 29–53	34,500	
October 19	1:00 p.m.	Texas A&M	Memorial Stadium; Lawrence, KS		L 22–47	34,000	
October 26	1:00 p.m.	at Missouri	Faurot Field; Columbia, MO (Border War)		L 12–36	60,287	
November 2	1:00 p.m.	No. 14 Kansas State	Memorial Stadium; Lawrence, KS (Sunflower Showdown)		L 0–64	43,000	
November 9	12:30 p.m.	at Nebraska	Memorial Stadium; Lincoln, NE (rivalry)		L 7–45	77,351	
November 16	1:00 p.m.	Oklahoma State	Memorial Stadium; Lawrence, KS		L 20–55	27,500	
*Non-conference game; ^{†}Homecoming; Rankings from AP Poll released prior to the game; All times are in Central time

== Roster ==
2002 Kansas Jayhawks football team roster
Players
Coaches
Offense

Pos.	#	Name	Class
WR	2	Byron Gasaway	Sr
WR	3	Jerome Lewis	Fr
QB	4	Bill Whittemore	Jr
QB	13	Zach Dyer	Sr
QB	14	Brian Luke	Fr
WR	34	Charles Gordon	Fr
TE	87	Adrian Jones	Jr

Defense

Pos.	#	Name	Class
LB	45	Kevin Kane	Fr
DE	92	David McMillan	So

Special teams

Pos.	#	Name	Class
KR	5	Neight Jacks	Sr

Head coach

- Mark Mangino

Coordinators/assistant coaches

Legend

- (C) Team captain
- (S) Suspended
- (I) Ineligible
- Injured
- Redshirt

Roster
Last update: 2002-09-04
