= 2002 Missouri Tigers football team =

American college football season

2002 Missouri Tigers football
- Conference: Big 12 Conference
- North Division
- Record: 5–7 (2–6 Big 12)
- Head coach: Gary Pinkel (2nd season)
- Offensive coordinator: Dave Christensen (2nd season)
- Offensive scheme: Spread
- Defensive coordinator: Matt Eberflus (2nd season)
- Base defense: 4–3
- Home stadium: Faurot Field

2002 Big 12 Conference football standings
	Conf.			Overall
Team	W		L	W		L
North Division
No. 20 Colorado xy	7	–	1	9	–	5
No. 7 Kansas State	6	–	2	11	–	2
Iowa State	4	–	4	7	–	7
Nebraska	3	–	5	7	–	7
Missouri	2	–	6	5	–	7
Kansas	0	–	8	2	–	10
South Division
No. 5 Oklahoma xy$	6	–	2	12	–	2
No. 6 Texas x	6	–	2	11	–	2
Texas Tech	5	–	3	9	–	5
Oklahoma State	5	–	3	8	–	5
Texas A&M	3	–	5	6	–	6
Baylor	1	–	7	3	–	9
Championship: Oklahoma 29, Colorado 7
$ – BCS representative as conference champion; x – Division champion/co-champions; y – Championship game participant; Rankings from AP Poll

The 2002 Missouri Tigers football team represented the University of Missouri during the 2002 NCAA Division I-A football season. They played their home games at Faurot Field in Columbia, Missouri. They were members of the Big 12 Conference in the North Division. The team was coached by head coach Gary Pinkel.

== Schedule ==
Date	Time	Opponent	Site	TV	Result	Attendance
August 31	2:30 pm	vs. Illinois*	Edward Jones Dome; St. Louis, Missouri (Arch Rivalry)	ABC	W 33–20	61,876
September 7	6:00 pm	Ball State*	Faurot Field; Columbia, Missouri		W 41–6	49,282
September 14	5:00 pm	at Bowling Green*	Doyt Perry Stadium; Bowling Green, Ohio		L 28–51	21,969
September 28	1:00 pm	Troy State*	Faurot Field; Columbia, Missouri		W 44–7	50,220
October 5	6:00 pm	No. 2 Oklahoma	Faurot Field; Columbia, Missouri (Tiger–Sooner Peace Pipe)	FSN	L 24–31	60,578
October 12	11:30 am	at Nebraska	Memorial Stadium; Lincoln, Nebraska (rivalry)	FSN PPV	L 13–24	78,014
October 19	6:00 pm	at Texas Tech	Jones SBC Stadium; Lubbock, Texas		L 38–52	42,781
October 26	1:00 pm	Kansas	Faurot Field; Columbia, Missouri		W 36–12	60,287
November 2	1:00 pm	at No. 22 Iowa State	Jack Trice Stadium; Ames, Iowa (Telephone Trophy)		L 35–42	44,339
November 9	11:30 am	No. 18 Colorado	Faurot Field; Columbia, Missouri	FSN	L 35–42 ^{OT}	48,465
November 16	1:00 pm	at Texas A&M	Kyle Field; College Station, Texas		W 33–27 ^{2OT}	78,186
November 23	2:30 pm	No. 10 Kansas State	Faurot Field; Columbia, Missouri	ABC	L 0–38	47,507
*Non-conference game; Rankings from Coaches' Poll released prior to the game; All times are in Central time

== Roster ==
2002 Missouri Tigers football team roster
Players
Coaches
Offense

Pos.	#	Name	Class
OL	75	Howard Brown	So
QB	14	Kirk Farmer	Sr
WR	12	Justin Gage	Sr
G	52	Tony Palmer	Fr
C	70	A. J. Ricker	Jr
QB	16	Brad Smith	Fr

Defense

Pos.	#	Name	Class
LB	21	Brandon Barnes	Jr
LB	32	Sean Doyle	Sr
CB	26	Michael Harden	Jr
CB	45	Shirdonya Mitchell	So
DT	99	C. J. Mosley	So

Special teams

Pos.	#	Name	Class

Head coach

- Gary Pinkel

Coordinators/assistant coaches

- Dave Christensen – Offensive coordinator
- David Yost – Quarterbacks
- Brian Jones – Running backs
- Andy Hill – Wide receivers
- Bruce Walker – Tight ends and assistant offensive line
- Matt Eberflus – Defensive coordinator
- Craig Kuligowski – Defensive line
- Dave Steckel – Linebackers
- Cornell Ford – Safeties

Legend

- (C) Team captain
- (S) Suspended
- (I) Ineligible
- Injured
- Redshirt

Roster
