= 2002 Texas Tech Red Raiders football team =

American college football season

2002 Texas Tech Red Raiders football

Tangerine Bowl champion

Tangerine Bowl, W 55–15 vs. Clemson
- Conference: Big 12 Conference
- South Division
- Record: 9–5 (5–3 Big 12)
- Head coach: Mike Leach (3rd season)
- Offensive scheme: Air raid
- Defensive coordinator: Greg McMackin (3rd season)
- Base defense: 4–3
- Home stadium: Jones SBC Stadium

2002 Big 12 Conference football standings
	Conf.			Overall
Team	W		L	W		L
North Division
No. 20 Colorado xy	7	–	1	9	–	5
No. 7 Kansas State	6	–	2	11	–	2
Iowa State	4	–	4	7	–	7
Nebraska	3	–	5	7	–	7
Missouri	2	–	6	5	–	7
Kansas	0	–	8	2	–	10
South Division
No. 5 Oklahoma xy$	6	–	2	12	–	2
No. 6 Texas x	6	–	2	11	–	2
Texas Tech	5	–	3	9	–	5
Oklahoma State	5	–	3	8	–	5
Texas A&M	3	–	5	6	–	6
Baylor	1	–	7	3	–	9
Championship: Oklahoma 29, Colorado 7
$ – BCS representative as conference champion; x – Division champion/co-champions; y – Championship game participant; Rankings from AP Poll

The 2002 Texas Tech Red Raiders football team represented Texas Tech University as a member of the Big 12 Conference during the 2002 NCAA Division I-A football season. In their third season under head coach Mike Leach, the Red Raiders compiled a 9–5 record (5–3 against Big 12 opponents), finished in a tie for third place in Southern Division of the Big 12, defeated Clemson in the 2002 Tangerine Bowl, and outscored opponents by a combined total of 537 to 439. The team played its home games at Jones SBC Stadium in Lubbock, Texas.

Quarterback Kliff Kingsbury totaled 5,017 passing yards and received the Sammy Baugh Trophy. Lawrence Flugence set the NCAA single-season record for most tackles.

== Schedule ==
Date	Time	Opponent	Rank	Site	TV	Result	Attendance
August 24	1:30 p.m.	at No. 13 Ohio State*		Ohio Stadium; Columbus, OH (Pigskin Classic)	ABC	L 21–45	100,037
September 7	7:00 p.m.	at SMU*		Gerald J. Ford Stadium; University Park, TX		W 24–14	32,000
September 14	2:30 p.m.	Ole Miss*		Jones SBC Stadium; Lubbock, TX	ABC	W 42–28	40,228
September 21	11:30 a.m.	No. 17 NC State*		Jones SBC Stadium; Lubbock, TX	FSN	L 48–51 ^{OT}	35,864
September 27	6:00 p.m.	at New Mexico*		University Stadium; Albuquerque, NM	ESPN2	W 49–0	35,111
October 5	1:00 p.m.	at No. 23 Texas A&M		Kyle Field; College Station, TX (rivalry)		W 48–47 ^{OT}	86,478
October 12	6:00 p.m.	at No. 11 Iowa State		Jack Trice Stadium; Ames, IA	TBS	L 17–31	51,842
October 19	6:00 p.m.	Missouri^{†}		Jones SBC Stadium; Lubbock, TX		W 52–38	42,781
October 26	12:30 p.m.	at No. 21 Colorado		Folsom Field; Boulder, CO	FSN	L 13–37	50,478
November 2	1:00 p.m.	Baylor		Jones SBC Stadium; Lubbock, TX (rivalry)		W 62–11	43,243
November 9	1:00 p.m.	Oklahoma State		Jones SBC Stadium; Lubbock, TX		W 49–24	44,595
November 16	2:30 p.m.	No. 4 Texas		Jones SBC Stadium; Lubbock, TX (rivalry)	ABC	W 42–38	52,047
November 23	6:00 p.m.	at No. 4 Oklahoma	No. 24	Gaylord Family Oklahoma Memorial Stadium; Norman, OK	TBS	L 15–60	75,553
December 23	5:30 p.m.	vs. Clemson*		Florida Citrus Bowl; Orlando, FL (Tangerine Bowl)	ESPN	W 55–15	21,689
*Non-conference game; ^{†}Homecoming; Rankings from AP Poll released prior to the game; All times are in Central time

== Game summaries ==
=== At Ohio State ===
	1	2	3	4	Total
Red Raiders	7	0	0	14	21
No. 13 Buckeyes	14	7	17	7	45

=== At SMU ===
	1	2	3	4	Total
Red Raiders	3	7	0	14	24
Mustangs	6	0	0	8	14

=== Ole Miss ===
	1	2	3	4	Total
Rebels	0	7	7	14	28
Red Raiders	10	18	7	7	42

=== NC State ===
	1	2	3	4	OT	Total
No. 17 Wolfpack	10	7	21	7	6	51
Red Raiders	7	3	7	28	3	48

=== At New Mexico ===
	1	2	3	4	Total
Red Raiders	7	21	7	14	49
Lobos	0	0	0	0	0

=== At Texas A&M ===
	1	2	3	4	OT	Total
Red Raiders	7	10	0	24	7	48
No. 23 Aggies	14	14	7	6	6	47

=== At Iowa State ===
	1	2	3	4	Total
Red Raiders	3	0	7	7	17
No. 11 Cyclones	3	0	21	7	31

=== Missouri ===
	1	2	3	4	Total
Tigers	10	7	7	14	38
Red Raiders	14	17	13	8	52

=== At Colorado ===
	1	2	3	4	Total
Red Raiders	10	3	0	0	13
No. 21 Buffaloes	10	6	14	7	37

=== Baylor ===
	1	2	3	4	Total
Bears	0	3	0	8	11
Red Raiders	7	21	21	13	62

=== Oklahoma State ===
	1	2	3	4	Total
Cowboys	0	14	7	3	24
Red Raiders	14	14	14	7	49

=== Texas ===
	1	2	3	4	Total
No. 4 Longhorns	14	7	7	10	38
Red Raiders	0	21	7	14	42

=== At Oklahoma ===
	1	2	3	4	Total
No. 24 Red Raiders	0	0	7	8	15
No. 4 Sooners	16	9	21	14	60

=== Vs. Clemson (Tangerine Bowl) ===
	1	2	3	4	Total
Red Raiders	17	17	7	14	55
Clemson	0	2	7	6	15

== Roster ==
2002 Texas Tech Red Raiders football team roster
Players
Coaches
Offense

Pos.	#	Name	Class
WR	1	Anton Paige	Sr
QB	2	B. J. Symons	Jr
WR	6	Nehemiah Glover	So
QB	16	Kliff Kingsbury	Sr
WR	27	Wes Welker	Jr
RB	22	Juan Denito Rabeau	Jr
OL	65	Casey Keck	Jr
C	66	Toby Cecil	Jr
OL	67	Bryan Kegans	Fr
OL	75	E. J. Whitley	Fr
OL	77	Dylan Gandy	So
OL	78	Manuel Ramirez	Fr
WR	82	Carlos Francis	Jr

Defense

Pos.	#	Name	Class
DE	9	Aaron Hunt	Sr
DB	12	Joselio Hanson	Sr
CB	20	Byron Johnson	Jr
DB	21	Ricky Sailor	Sr
DB	22	Cody Davis	Sr
DB	28	Ryan Aycock	Jr
DL	91	Adell Duckett	So
DL	93	Chris Hudler	Fr
LB	94	Lennard Christensen	Sr
DL	95	Rodney McKinney	Sr
DE	96	Neno Falls	Jr

Special teams

Pos.	#	Name	Class
K	37	Ryan Bishop	So

Head coach

- Mike Leach

Coordinators/assistant coaches

- Dave Aranda (GA)

Legend

- (C) Team captain
- (S) Suspended
- (I) Ineligible
- Injured
- Redshirt

Roster
Last update: 2002-10-16

== Team players in the NFL ==
Player	Position	Round	Pick	NFL club
Aaron Hunt	Defensive tackle	6	194	Denver Broncos
Kliff Kingsbury	Quarterback	6	201	New England Patriots
