= 2002 Baylor Bears football team =

American college football season

2002 Baylor Bears football
- Conference: Big 12 Conference
- South Division
- Record: 3–9 (1–7 Big 12)
- Head coach: Kevin Steele (4th season)
- Offensive coordinator: Dave Baldwin (1st season)
- Offensive scheme: Multiple pro-style
- Defensive coordinator: Bob Trott (1st season)
- Base defense: 4–3
- Home stadium: Floyd Casey Stadium

2002 Big 12 Conference football standings
| | Conf. | | | Overall |
| Team | W | | L | W | | L |
|---|---|---|---|---|---|---|
North Division
| No. 20 Colorado xy | 7 | – | 1 | 9 | – | 5 |
| No. 7 Kansas State | 6 | – | 2 | 11 | – | 2 |
| Iowa State | 4 | – | 4 | 7 | – | 7 |
| Nebraska | 3 | – | 5 | 7 | – | 7 |
| Missouri | 2 | – | 6 | 5 | – | 7 |
| Kansas | 0 | – | 8 | 2 | – | 10 |
South Division
| No. 5 Oklahoma xy$ | 6 | – | 2 | 12 | – | 2 |
| No. 6 Texas x | 6 | – | 2 | 11 | – | 2 |
| Texas Tech | 5 | – | 3 | 9 | – | 5 |
| Oklahoma State | 5 | – | 3 | 8 | – | 5 |
| Texas A&M | 3 | – | 5 | 6 | – | 6 |
| Baylor | 1 | – | 7 | 3 | – | 9 |
Championship: Oklahoma 29, Colorado 7
$ – BCS representative as conference champion; x – Division champion/co-champions; y – Championship game participant; Rankings from AP Poll

The 2002 Baylor Bears football team represented Baylor University as a member of the South Division of the Big 12 Conference during the 2002 NCAA Division I-A football season. Led by Kevin Steele in his fourth and final season as head coach, the Bears compiled an overall record of 3–8 with a mark of 1-7 in conference play, placing last out of six teams in the Big 12's South Division. The team played home games at Floyd Casey Stadium in Waco, Texas.

Steele was fired after the conclusion of the season.

== Schedule ==
| Date | Time | Opponent | Site | TV | Result | Attendance | Source |
|---|---|---|---|---|---|---|---|
| August 31 | 2:30 p.m. | at California* | California Memorial Stadium; Berkeley, CA | | L 22–70 | 27,185 | |
| September 7 | 6:00 p.m. | Samford* | Floyd Casey Stadium; Waco, TX | | W 50–12 | 28,375 | |
| September 14 | 7:00 p.m. | at New Mexico* | University Stadium; Albuquerque, NM | | L 0–23 | 30,013 | |
| September 21 | 6:00 p.m. | Tulsa* | Floyd Casey Stadium; Waco, TX | | W 37–25 | 30,337 | |
| October 5 | 1:00 p.m. | Kansas | Floyd Casey Stadium; Waco, TX | | W 35–32 | 22,103 | |
| October 12 | 11:30 a.m. | Texas A&M | Floyd Casey Stadium; Waco, TX (Battle of the Brazos) | FSN | L 0–41 | 38,673 | |
| October 19 | 2:00 p.m. | at No. 23 Colorado | Folsom Field; Boulder, CO | | L 0–34 | 46,281 | |
| October 26 | 2:00 p.m. | No. 20 Kansas State^{†} | Floyd Casey Stadium; Waco, TX | | L 10–44 | 20,247 | |
| November 2 | 1:00 p.m. | at Texas Tech | Jones SBC Stadium; Lubbock, TX (rivalry) | | L 11–62 | 43,243 | |
| November 9 | 11:30 a.m. | at No. 4 Texas | Darrell K Royal–Texas Memorial Stadium; Austin, TX (rivalry) | PPV | L 0–41 | 83,016 | |
| November 16 | 1:00 p.m. | No. 4 Oklahoma | Floyd Casey Stadium; Waco, TX | | L 9–49 | 28,375 | |
| November 23 | 1:00 p.m. | at Oklahoma State | Lewis Field; Stillwater, OK | | L 28–63 | 37,250 | |
*Non-conference game; ^{†}Homecoming; Rankings from AP Poll released prior to the game; All times are in Central time

== Roster ==
2002 Baylor Bears football team roster
Players
Coaches
Offense

| Pos. | # | Name | Class |
|---|---|---|---|
| OL | 79 | Glen Oskin | Fr |
| WR | 80 | Ray Harrington | Sr |
| WR | 81 | Reggie Newhouse | Sr |
| WR | 82 | Robert Quiroga | Jr |
| TE | 85 | Chris DeLeenheer | Sr |
| TE | 86 | Billy Crawford | So |
| WR | 89 | James Whiteland | Fr |

Defense

| Pos. | # | Name | Class |

Special teams

| Pos. | # | Name | Class |

Head coach

- Kevin Steele

Coordinators/assistant coaches

Legend

- (C) Team captain
- (S) Suspended
- (I) Ineligible
- Injured
- Redshirt

Roster
Last update: 2003-01-12
