= 2002 Houston Bowl =

| Southern Miss Golden Eagles | Oklahoma State Cowboys |
| (7–5) | (7–5) |
| Conference USA | Big 12 |
| 23 | 33 |
| Head coach: Jeff Bower | Head coach: Les Miles |
| | 1 | 2 | 3 | 4 | Total |
|---|---|---|---|---|---|
| Southern Miss | 3 | 10 | 10 | 0 | 23 |
| Oklahoma State | 10 | 10 | 0 | 13 | 33 |
- Date: December 27, 2002
- Season: 2002
- Stadium: Reliant Stadium
- Location: Houston, Texas
- Favorite: Oklahoma State by 10
- Referee: Courtney Mauzy (ACC)
- Attendance: 44,687
- Payout: US$750,000 per team

United States TV coverage
- Network: ESPN
- Announcers: Mark Malone, Sean Salisbury, Tracy Wolfson

The 2002 Houston Bowl was the third edition of the college football bowl game (known in its first two years as the "Galleryfurniture.com Bowl") and was played at Reliant Stadium in Houston, Texas. The game pitted the Oklahoma State Cowboys from the Big 12 Conference and the Southern Miss Golden Eagles from Conference USA (C-USA). The game was the final competition of the 2002 football season for each team and resulted in a 33–23 Oklahoma State victory.

== Scoring summary ==
First quarter

- Oklahoma State Josh Fields 3 yard touchdown pass to Mike Denard. 7–0 Oklahoma State
- Oklahoma State Luke Phillips 46 yard field goal. 10–0 Oklahoma State
- Southern Miss Curt Jones 38 yard field goal. 10–3 Oklahoma State

Second quarter

- Southern Miss Dustin Almond 13 yard touchdown run. 10–10 Tie
- Oklahoma State Luke Phillips 52 yard field goal. 13–10 Oklahoma State
- Southern Miss Curt Jones 24 yard field goal. 13–13 Tie
- Oklahoma State Josh Fields 51 yard touchdown pass to Rashaun Woods. 20–13 Oklahoma State

Third quarter

- Southern Miss James Walley 2 yard touchdown run. 20–20 Tie
- Southern Miss Curt Jones 30 yard field goal. 23–20 Southern Miss

Fourth quarter

- Oklahoma State Luke Phillips 28 yard field goal. 23–23 Tie
- Oklahoma State Tatum Bell 22 yard touchdown run. 30–23 Oklahoma State
- Oklahoma State Luke Phillips 24 yard field goal. 33–23 Oklahoma State
