= 2002 Texas A&M Aggies football team =

American college football season

2002 Texas A&M Aggies football
- Conference: Big 12 Conference
- South Division
- Record: 6–6 (3–5 Big 12)
- Head coach: R. C. Slocum (14th season)
- Offensive coordinator: Dino Babers (2nd season)
- Co-offensive coordinator: Kevin Sumlin (1st season)
- Offensive scheme: Spread
- Defensive coordinator: Mike Hankwitz (6th season)
- Base defense: 4–3
- Home stadium: Kyle Field

2002 Big 12 Conference football standings
	Conf.			Overall
Team	W		L	W		L
North Division
No. 20 Colorado xy	7	–	1	9	–	5
No. 7 Kansas State	6	–	2	11	–	2
Iowa State	4	–	4	7	–	7
Nebraska	3	–	5	7	–	7
Missouri	2	–	6	5	–	7
Kansas	0	–	8	2	–	10
South Division
No. 5 Oklahoma xy$	6	–	2	12	–	2
No. 6 Texas x	6	–	2	11	–	2
Texas Tech	5	–	3	9	–	5
Oklahoma State	5	–	3	8	–	5
Texas A&M	3	–	5	6	–	6
Baylor	1	–	7	3	–	9
Championship: Oklahoma 29, Colorado 7
$ – BCS representative as conference champion; x – Division champion/co-champions; y – Championship game participant; Rankings from AP Poll

The 2002 Texas A&M Aggies football team completed the season with a 6–6 record. The Aggies had a regular season Big 12 record of 3–5. Head coach R. C. Slocum was fired at the end of the season and replaced by Dennis Franchione. Despite finishing the season bowl eligible, the Aggies did not participate in a bowl game.

== Schedule ==
Date	Time	Opponent	Rank	Site	TV	Result	Attendance
August 31	6:00 pm	Louisiana–Lafayette*	No. 23	Kyle Field; College Station, TX		W 31–7	75,087
September 7	11:00 am	at Pittsburgh*	No. 20	Heinz Field; Pittsburgh, PA	ESPN	W 14–12	45,489
September 21	2:30 pm	No. 7 Virginia Tech*	No. 19	Kyle Field; College Station, TX	ABC	L 3–13	83,746
September 28	6:00 pm	Louisiana Tech*	No. 24	Kyle Field; College Station, TX		W 31–3	72,802
October 5	1:00 pm	Texas Tech	No. 23	Kyle Field; College Station, TX (rivalry)		L 47–48 ^{OT}	86,478
October 12	11:30 am	at Baylor		Floyd Casey Stadium; Waco, TX	FSN	W 41–0	38,673
October 19	1:00 pm	at Kansas		Memorial Stadium; Lawrence, KS		W 47–22	34,000
October 26	6:00 pm	Nebraska		Kyle Field; College Station, TX	TBS	L 31–38	81,054
November 2	11:30 am	at Oklahoma State		Lewis Field; Stillwater, OK	FSN	L 23–28	47,607
November 9	2:30 pm	No. 1 Oklahoma		Kyle Field; College Station, TX	ABC	W 30–26	84,036
November 16	1:00 pm	Missouri		Kyle Field; College Station, TX		L 27–33 ^{2OT}	78,186
November 29	11:00 am	at No. 10 Texas		Darrell K Royal–Texas Memorial Stadium; Austin, TX (rivalry)	ABC	L 20–50	83,711
*Non-conference game; Rankings from AP Poll released prior to the game; All times are in Central time

== Game summaries ==
=== Louisiana-Lafayette ===
	1	2	3	4	Total
Louisiana-Lafayette	0	0	0	7	7
Texas A&M	0	3	14	14	31

=== Pittsburgh ===
	1	2	3	4	Total
Texas A&M	0	7	7	0	14
#23 Pittsburgh	0	0	0	12	12

=== Virginia Tech ===
	1	2	3	4	Total
Virginia Tech	0	3	3	7	13
Texas A&M	3	0	0	0	3

=== Louisiana Tech ===
	1	2	3	4	Total
Louisiana Tech	0	3	0	0	3
Texas A&M	10	7	0	14	31

=== Texas Tech ===
	1	2	3	4	OT	Total
Texas Tech	7	10	0	24	7	48
Texas A&M	14	14	7	6	6	47

=== Baylor ===
	1	2	3	4	Total
Texas A&M	7	3	14	17	41
Baylor	0	0	0	0	0

=== Kansas ===
	1	2	3	4	Total
Texas A&M	0	24	7	16	47
Kansas	0	0	7	15	22

=== Nebraska ===
	1	2	3	4	Total
Nebraska	7	7	7	17	38
Texas A&M	14	7	10	0	31

=== Oklahoma State ===
	1	2	3	4	Total
Texas A&M	7	7	9	0	23
Oklahoma State	7	21	0	0	28

=== Oklahoma ===
	1	2	3	4	Total
#1 Oklahoma	7	6	10	3	26
Texas A&M	0	13	14	3	30

=== Missouri ===
	1	2	3	4	OT	2OT	Total
Missouri	3	14	0	7	3	6	33
Texas A&M	3	0	7	14	3	0	27

=== Texas ===
	1	2	3	4	Total
Texas A&M	7	0	7	6	20
#9 Texas	9	14	7	20	50

== Roster ==
2002 Texas A&M Aggies football team roster
Players
Coaches
Offense

Pos.	#	Name	Class
WR	9	Bethel Johnson	Sr
QB	18	Dustin Long	So
QB	16	Reggie McNeal	Fr
WR	5	Terrence Murphy	So

Defense

Pos.	#	Name	Class
DT	94	Ty Warren	Sr
DE	99	David Ross	Fr

Special teams

Pos.	#	Name	Class

Head coach

- R. C. Slocum

Coordinators/assistant coaches

Legend

- (C) Team captain
- (S) Suspended
- (I) Ineligible
- Injured
- Redshirt
