= 2002 Oklahoma Sooners football team =

American college football season

2002 Oklahoma Sooners football

Big 12 champion Big 12 South Division co-champion Rose Bowl champion

Big 12 Championship, W 29–7 vs. Colorado

Rose Bowl, W 34–14 vs. Washington State
- Conference: Big 12 Conference
- South Division

Ranking
- Coaches: No. 5
- AP: No. 5
- Record: 12–2 (6–2 Big 12)
- Head coach: Bob Stoops (4th season)
- Co-offensive coordinators: Chuck Long (1st season); Kevin Wilson (1st season)
- Offensive scheme: Spread
- Co-defensive coordinators: Mike Stoops (4th season); Brent Venables (4th season)
- Base defense: 4–3
- Captains: Quentin Griffin; Teddy Lehman; Trent Smith; Jason White; Andre Woolfolk
- Home stadium: Gaylord Family Oklahoma Memorial Stadium

2002 Big 12 Conference football standings
	Conf.			Overall
Team	W		L	W		L
North Division
No. 20 Colorado xy	7	–	1	9	–	5
No. 7 Kansas State	6	–	2	11	–	2
Iowa State	4	–	4	7	–	7
Nebraska	3	–	5	7	–	7
Missouri	2	–	6	5	–	7
Kansas	0	–	8	2	–	10
South Division
No. 5 Oklahoma xy$	6	–	2	12	–	2
No. 6 Texas x	6	–	2	11	–	2
Texas Tech	5	–	3	9	–	5
Oklahoma State	5	–	3	8	–	5
Texas A&M	3	–	5	6	–	6
Baylor	1	–	7	3	–	9
Championship: Oklahoma 29, Colorado 7
$ – BCS representative as conference champion; x – Division champion/co-champions; y – Championship game participant; Rankings from AP Poll

The 2002 Oklahoma Sooners football team represented the University of Oklahoma during the 2002 NCAA Division I-A football season, the 108th season of Sooner football. The team was led by Bob Stoops in his fourth season as head coach. They played their games at Gaylord Family Oklahoma Memorial Stadium in Norman, Oklahoma. They were a charter of the Big 12 Conference.

Conference play began with a win over the Missouri Tigers in Columbia, Missouri on October 5, and ended with their second win over the Colorado Buffaloes that season in the 2002 Big 12 Championship Game on December 7. The Sooners finished the regular season 11–2 (7–2 in Big 12), winning their second Big 12 title and their 38th conference title overall. They received an automatic berth to play in their first Rose Bowl in school history, where they beat the Washington State Cougars, 34–14.

Following the season, Andre Woolfolk was selected 28th overall in the 2003 NFL draft, along with Quentin Griffin in the 4th round, Jimmy Wilkerson in the 6th, and Trent Smith in the 7th.

== Schedule ==
Date	Time	Opponent	Rank	Site	TV	Result	Attendance
August 30	7:00 p.m.	at Tulsa*	No. 1	Skelly Stadium; Tulsa, OK	ESPN	W 37–0	40,385
September 7	2:30 p.m.	Alabama*	No. 2	Gaylord Family Oklahoma Memorial Stadium; Norman, OK	ABC	W 37–27	75,564
September 14	6:00 p.m.	UTEP*	No. 2	Gaylord Family Oklahoma Memorial Stadium; Norman, OK	PPV	W 68–0	74,468
September 28	6:00 p.m.	South Florida*	No. 2	Gaylord Family Oklahoma Memorial Stadium; Norman, OK	TBS	W 31–14	74,432
October 5	6:00 p.m.	at Missouri	No. 2	Faurot Field; Columbia, MO (rivalry)	FSN	W 31–24	60,578
October 12	2:30 p.m.	vs. No. 3 Texas	No. 2	Cotton Bowl; Dallas, TX (Red River Shootout) (College GameDay)	ABC	W 35–24	75,587
October 19	2:30 p.m.	No. 9 Iowa State^{†}	No. 2	Gaylord Family Oklahoma Memorial Stadium; Norman, OK	ABC	W 49–3	75,201
November 2	2:30 p.m.	No. 13 Colorado	No. 2	Gaylord Family Oklahoma Memorial Stadium; Norman, OK	ABC	W 27–11	75,403
November 9	2:30 p.m.	at Texas A&M	No. 1	Kyle Field; College Station, TX	ABC	L 26–30	84,036
November 16	1:00 p.m.	at Baylor	No. 4	Floyd Casey Stadium; Waco, TX		W 49–9	28,375
November 23	6:00 p.m.	No. 24 Texas Tech	No. 4	Gaylord Family Oklahoma Memorial Stadium; Norman, OK	TBS	W 60–15	75,553
November 30	1:30 p.m.	at Oklahoma State	No. 3	Lewis Field; Stillwater, OK (Bedlam Series)	FSN	L 28–38	48,500
December 7	7:00 p.m.	vs. No. 12 Colorado	No. 8	Reliant Stadium; Houston, TX (Big 12 Championship Game)	ABC	W 29–7	63,332
January 1, 2003	3:30 p.m.	vs. No. 7 Washington State*	No. 8	Rose Bowl; Pasadena, CA (Rose Bowl)	ABC	W 34–14	86,848
*Non-conference game; ^{†}Homecoming; Rankings from AP Poll released prior to the game; All times are in Central time

== Roster ==
2002 Oklahoma Sooners football team roster
Players
Coaches
Offense

Pos.	#	Name	Class
WR	9	Mark Clayton	So
G	69	Brad Davis	Sr
WR	12	Curtis Fagan	Sr
RB	22	Quentin Griffin	Sr
QB	8	Nate Hybl	Sr
WR	6	Antwone Savage	Sr
OL	60	Wes Sims	So
G	75	Mike Skinner	Sr
TE	88	Trent Smith	Sr
QB	18	Jason White	Jr

Defense

Pos.	#	Name	Class
LB	11	Teddy Lehman	Jr
LB	25	Andrew Brewer	So
LB	48	Gayron Allen	So
DT	80	Dan Cody	So
DT	97	Tommie Harris	So
DB	23	Mike Hawkins	Fr
DL	77	Davin Joseph	Fr
DT	93	Kory Klein	Jr
DB	30	Bobby Klinck	Fr
DE	46	Zach Latimer	Fr
DE	45	Jimmy Wilkerson	Jr
CB	17	Andre Woolfolk	Sr

Special teams

Pos.	#	Name	Class

Head coach

- Bob Stoops

Coordinators/assistant coaches

- Chuck Long – Co-offensive coordinator & quarterbacks
- Kevin Wilson – Co-offensive coordinator & offensive line
- Cale Gundy – Running backs
- Darrell Wyatt – Wide receivers
- Jonathan Hayes – Tight ends & special teams
- Mike Stoops – Co-defensive coordinator & defensive backs
- Brent Venables – Co-defensive coordinator & linebackers
- Jackie Shipp – Defensive line
- Bobby Jack Wright – Defensive ends

Legend

- (C) Team captain
- (S) Suspended
- (I) Ineligible
- Injured
- Redshirt

Roster

== Game summaries ==
=== Tulsa ===
#1 Oklahoma Sooners at Tulsa Golden Hurricane

Team	1	2	3	4	Total
• #1 Oklahoma	3	0	14	20	37
Tulsa	0	0	0	0	0

- Date: August 30
- Location: Skelly Stadium, Tulsa, Oklahoma
- Game start: 7:05 p.m. CST
- Elapsed time: 3:00
- Game attendance: 40,385
- Referee: Steve Usechek
- TV announcers (ESPN): Steve Levy (Play–by–play), Rod Gilmore (Color), & Alex Flanagan (Sideline)

=== Alabama ===
Alabama Crimson Tide at #2 Oklahoma Sooners

Team	1	2	3	4	Total
Alabama	3	0	14	10	27
• #2 Oklahoma	9	14	0	14	37

- Date: September 7
- Location: Gaylord Family Oklahoma Memorial Stadium, Norman, Oklahoma
- Game start: 2:40 p.m. CST
- Elapsed time: 3:40
- Game attendance: 75,564
- Referee: Terry Brown
- TV announcers (ABC): Brent Musburger (Play–by–play), Gary Danielson (Color), & Jack Arute (Sideline)

=== UTEP ===
UTEP Miners at #2 Oklahoma Sooners

Team	1	2	3	4	Total
UTEP	0	0	0	0	0
• #2 Oklahoma	14	24	17	13	68

- Date: September 14
- Location: Gaylord Family Oklahoma Memorial Stadium, Norman, Oklahoma
- Game start: 6:09 p.m. CST
- Elapsed time: 3:09
- Game attendance: 74,468
- Referee: Jon Bible
- TV announcers (PPV): Bill land (sportscaster) (Play–by–play), Dean Blevins (Color), & Zach Klein (Sideline)

=== South Florida ===
South Florida Bulls at #2 Oklahoma Sooners

Team	1	2	3	4	Total
South Florida	0	0	0	14	14
• #2 Oklahoma	0	21	7	3	31

- Date: September 28
- Location: Gaylord Family Oklahoma Memorial Stadium, Norman, Oklahoma
- Game start: 6:00 p.m. CST
- Elapsed time: 3:34
- Game attendance: 74,432
- Referee: John Robison
- TV announcers (TBS): Ron Thulin (Play–by–play), Charles Davis (Color), Craig Sager, & Erin Andrews (Sidelines)

=== Missouri ===
#2 Oklahoma Sooners at Missouri Tigers

Team	1	2	3	4	Total
• #2 Oklahoma	7	3	13	8	31
Missouri	0	7	10	7	24

- Date: October 5
- Location: Faurot Field, Columbia, Missouri
- Game start: 6:11 p.m. CST
- Elapsed time: 3:22
- Game attendance: 60,578
- Referee: Cooper Castleberry
- TV announcers (FSN): Joel Meyers (Play–by–play), Dave Lapham (Color), & Eric Clemons (Sideline)

=== Texas (Red River Shootout) ===
#3 Texas Longhorns vs. #2 Oklahoma Sooners

Team	1	2	3	4	Total
#3 Texas	7	7	3	7	24
• #2 Oklahoma	3	8	3	21	35

- Date: October 12
- Location: Cotton Bowl, Dallas
- Game start: 2:41 p.m. CST
- Elapsed time: 3:39
- Game attendance: 75,587
- Referee: Tom Ahlers
- TV announcers (ABC): Brent Musburger (Play–by–play), Gary Danielson (Color), & Jack Arute (Sideline)

=== Iowa State ===
#9 Iowa State Cyclones at #2 Oklahoma Sooners

Team	1	2	3	4	Total
#9 Iowa State	0	0	3	0	3
• #2 Oklahoma	14	21	7	7	49

- Date: October 19
- Location: Gaylord Family Oklahoma Memorial Stadium, Norman, Oklahoma
- Game start: 2:30 p.m. CST
- Elapsed time: 3:13
- Game attendance: 75,201
- Referee: John Laurie
- TV announcers (ABC): Brad Nessler (Play–by–play), Bob Griese (Color), & Lynn Swann (Sideline)

=== Colorado ===
#13 Colorado Buffaloes at #2 Oklahoma Sooners

Team	1	2	3	4	Total
#13 Colorado	3	0	8	0	11
• #2 Oklahoma	10	10	7	0	27

- Date: November 2
- Location: Gaylord Family Oklahoma Memorial Stadium, Norman, Oklahoma
- Game start: 2:35 p.m. CST
- Elapsed time: 3:15
- Game attendance: 75,403
- Referee: Randy Christal
- TV announcers (ABC): Brent Musburger (Play–by–play), Gary Danielson (Color), & Jack Arute (Sideline)

=== Texas A&M ===
#1 Oklahoma Sooners at Texas A&M Aggies

Team	1	2	3	4	Total
#1 Oklahoma	7	6	10	3	26
• Texas A&M	0	13	14	3	30

- Date: November 9
- Location: Kyle Field, College Station, Texas
- Game start: 2:38 p.m. CST
- Elapsed time: 3:07
- Game attendance: 84,036
- Referee: Hal Dowden
- TV announcers (ABC): Brad Nessler (Play–by–play), Bob Griese (Color), & Lynn Swann (Sideline)

=== Baylor ===
#4 Oklahoma Sooners at Baylor Bears

Team	1	2	3	4	Total
• #4 Oklahoma	7	14	21	7	49
Baylor	3	0	0	6	9

- Date: November 16
- Location: Floyd Casey Stadium, Waco, Texas
- Game start: 1:00 p.m. CST
- Elapsed time: 3:05
- Game attendance: 28,375
- Referee: Randy Christal

=== Texas Tech ===
#24 Texas Tech Red Raiders at #4 Oklahoma Sooners

Team	1	2	3	4	Total
#24 Texas Tech	0	0	7	8	15
• #4 Oklahoma	16	9	21	14	60

- Date: November 23
- Location: Gaylord Family Oklahoma Memorial Stadium, Norman, Oklahoma
- Game start: 6:05 p.m. CST
- Elapsed time: 3:26
- Game attendance: 75,553
- Referee: Steve Usechek
- TV announcers (TBS): Ron Thulin (Play–by–play), Charles Davis (Color), Craig Sager, & Erin Andrews (Sidelines)

=== Oklahoma State (Bedlam Series) ===
#3 Oklahoma Sooners at Oklahoma State Cowboys

Team	1	2	3	4	Total
#3 Oklahoma	0	6	8	14	28
• Oklahoma State	14	14	7	3	38

- Date: November 30
- Location: Lewis Field, Stillwater, Oklahoma
- Game start: 1:40 p.m. CST
- Elapsed time: 3:18
- Game attendance: 48,500
- Referee: Hal Dowden
- TV announcers (FSN): Joel Meyers (Play–by–play), Dave Lapham (Color), & Eric Clemons (Sideline)

=== Colorado (Big 12 Championship Game) ===
#8 Oklahoma Sooners vs. #12 Colorado Buffaloes

Team	1	2	3	4	Total
• #8 Oklahoma	7	6	6	10	29
#12 Colorado	0	0	7	0	7

- Date: December 7
- Location: Reliant Stadium, Houston, Texas
- Game start: 7:07 p.m. CST
- Elapsed time: 3:05
- Game attendance: 63,332
- Referee: Jon Bible
- TV announcers (ABC): Brent Musburger (Play–by–play), Gary Danielson (Color), & Jack Arute (Sideline)

=== Washington State (Rose Bowl) ===
#8 Oklahoma Sooners vs. #7 Washington State Cougars

Team	1	2	3	4	Total
• #8 Oklahoma	3	14	3	14	34
#7 Washington State	0	0	0	14	14

- Date: January 1
- Location: Rose Bowl, Pasadena, California
- Game start: 4:00 p.m. CST
- Elapsed time: 3:20
- Game attendance: 86,848
- Referee: Steve Shaw
- TV announcers (ABC): Brent Musburger (Play–by–play), Gary Danielson (Color), & Jack Arute (Sideline)

== Rankings ==
Ranking movements Legend: ██ Increase in ranking ██ Decrease in ranking
	Week																	
Poll	Pre	1	2	3	4	5	6	7	8	9	10	11	12	13	14	15	16	Final
AP	2	1	2	2	2	2	3	2	2	2	2	1	4	4	3	8	8	5
Coaches Poll	3	3	3	3	3	3	3	2	2	2	2	2	6	5	4	9	8	5
BCS	Not released									1	1	1	4	4	3	7	7	Not released

== 2003 NFL draft ==
The 2003 NFL draft was held on April 26–27, 2003 at the Theatre at Madison Square Garden in New York City. The following Oklahoma players were either selected or signed as undrafted free agents following the draft.

Player	Position	Round	Overall pick	NFL team
Andre Woolfolk	CB	1st	28	Tennessee Titans
Quentin Griffin	RB	4th	108	Denver Broncos
Jimmy Wilkerson	DE	6th	189	Kansas City Chiefs
Trent Smith	TE	7th	223	Baltimore Ravens
Nate Hybl	QB	Undrafted		Cleveland Browns
