= Mark Mariscal =

American football player (born 1979)

No. 8
- Position: Punter

Personal information
- Born: September 10, 1979 (age 47); Tallahassee, Florida, U.S.
- Listed height: 6 ft 2 in (1.88 m)
- Listed weight: 201 lb (91 kg)

Career information
- High school: Lincoln (Tallahassee)
- College: Colorado (1998–2002)
- NFL draft: 2003: undrafted

Career history
- 2003: New Orleans Saints*
- 2003-2004: New York Jets*
- 2004: New Orleans Saints*
- 2004: Montreal Alouettes
- 2005: Denver Broncos*
- 2005: Philadelphia Eagles*
- * Offseason or practice squad member only

Awards and highlights
- Consensus All-American (2002); Ray Guy Award (2002); First-team All-Big 12 (2002)

Career CFL statistics
- Punting yards: 1,479
- Punting average: 43.5
- Longest punt: 67
- Field goals made: 3
- Field goals attempted: 7
- Field goal percentage: 42.9%

Mark Mariscal (born September 10, 1979) is an American former professional football player who was a punter in the Canadian Football League (CFL) for a single season in 2004 with the Montreal Alouettes. He played college football for the Colorado Buffaloes, winning the Ray Guy Award and earning consensus All-American honors in 2002.

== College career ==
Mariscal attended the University of Colorado Boulder, where he played for the Colorado Buffaloes football team from 1998 to 2002. As a senior, he set an NCAA Division I record for most punts of fifty-plus yards (29), was a first-team All-Big 12 selection, and was recognized as a consensus first-team All-American (2002). He was also the 2002 recipient of the Ray Guy Award as the nation's best college punter.

== Professional career ==
Mariscal signed with the New Orleans Saints of the National Football League (NFL) as an undrafted free agent in 2003, and was later a member of the NFL preseason or practice squads of the New York Jets, the Denver Broncos and the Philadelphia Eagles. In 2004, Mariscal appeared in six regular season CFL games for the Montreal Alouettes, playing occasionally as placekicker as well.
