= Taco Wallace =

American gridiron football player (born 1981)

No. 87, 82
- Position: Wide receiver

Personal information
- Born: April 14, 1981 (age 45); Harbor City, California, U.S.
- Listed height: 6 ft 1 in (1.85 m)
- Listed weight: 190 lb (86 kg)

Career information
- High school: William Howard Taft (Woodland Hills, California)
- College: Kansas State
- NFL draft: 2003: 7th round, 224th overall pick

Career history
- Seattle Seahawks (2003–2004); Green Bay Packers (2005); Seattle Seahawks (2006)*; Edmonton Eskimos (2007)*
- * Offseason or practice squad member only
- Stats at Pro Football Reference

Lawrence "Taco" Lasalle Wallace (born April 18, 1981) is an American former professional football wide receiver.

== College career ==
Wallace began his collegiate career at Mt San Antonio College in California where he started for two seasons. He then transferred to Kansas State for his two final years. As a senior in 2002, Wallace led the team with 39 receptions for 704 yards and five touchdowns.

== Professional career ==
=== Seattle Seahawks (first stint) ===
Wallace was selected in the seventh round by the Seattle Seahawks in the 2003 NFL draft with the 224th overall pick. He moved in and out of the Seahawks lineup, being at best a fifth string wide receiver, until he was released on September 3, 2005.

=== Green Bay Packers ===
Wallace signed with the Green Bay Packers on October 25, 2005. He was waived on November 8, 2005.

=== Seattle Seahawks (second stint) ===
Wallace signed a reserve/future contract with the Seahawks on January 9, 2006. He was waived on August 28, 2006.

=== Edmonton Eskimos ===
On January 26, 2007, he signed a contract with the Edmonton Eskimos of the CFL, and attended the team's training camp. However, he did not make the team and was released. He was released on June 17, 2007.

== Sources ==
pro-football-reference.com
