= Bill Doleman =

American sports journalist

Bill Doleman (born 1966) is a veteran sportscaster originally from Fairbury, Nebraska.

== Biography ==
Bill Doleman joined Comcast Sports Net Houston in 2012 after the MountainWest Sports Network ceased operations in May of that year. His primary assignment with CSN was to serve as the studio host for the Houston Rockets of the NBA. He is also the primary host for the network's college football and golf shows and was one of the studio hosts for the Houston Astros. Doleman was one of the main anchors on Sports Net Central and also a play-by-play announcer for NBC Sports Group during the 2016 and 2020 Olympic Games.

Prior to moving to Houston, Doleman called the play-by-play for football, basketball, baseball, and volleyball for the network and served as an anchor and host for The Mtn. He also called Big 12 men's basketball games for ESPN and several conferences such as the Big Ten and Mountain West. He was also a broadcaster for the Lincoln Saltdogs independent professional baseball team before moving to Denver and joining The Mtn. full-time. He was replaced in Lincoln by Drew Bontadelli, the current voice of the Saltdogs. Billy D also served as the director of broadcasting and communications for the team. The Godfather began his career with Nebraska Public Television calling the play-by-play for numerous sports in the state and was the first host of Big Red WrapUp. He is a former Nebraska Sportscaster of the Year. Bill served as a sports director for Houston station KTBU-TV, 1999-2000, where he called games and hosted coaches shows for the University of Houston Cougars. He returned to Lincoln and began working for KFOR 1240 AM calling baseball and later for KLMS/ESPN 1480 where he was the Program Director and Announcer. He hosted "The Average Joe Sports Show" and a Christian-sports show "Goin' Deep with Ron Brown." He also worked as a host, anchor, and play-by-play for many sports including college football and basketball for numerous networks, including ABC Sports, Fox Sports Net, CBS College Sports Network, and the Big Ten Network.

His favorite memory while working was calling the 1999 Cheese Rolling Games where he got to see his hero Steven Brain winner of three of the four races. He also likes to compete in Wife Carrying, Quidditch and Tractor Pulling. Doleman is a multi time champion in Wife Carrying and Quidditch, while he has just recently joined the competition scene in Tractor Pulling. Along with teaching at the University of Nebraska-Lincoln he was once a student there as well, working various jobs and being a member of the fraternity Theta Xi.
