= Gary Reasons =

American football player (born 1962)

No. 55, 52
- Position: Linebacker

Personal information
- Born: February 18, 1962 (age 64); Chicago, Illinois, U.S.
- Listed height: 6 ft 4 in (1.93 m)
- Listed weight: 235 lb (107 kg)

Career information
- High school: Crowley (Crowley, Texas)
- College: Northwestern State
- NFL draft: 1984: 4th round, 105th overall pick

Career history
- New York Giants (1984–1991); Cincinnati Bengals (1992)

Awards and highlights
- 2× Super Bowl champion (XXI, XXV); PFWA All-Rookie Team (1984); 76th greatest New York Giant of all-time; 3× All-American (Div I-AA) (1981, 1982, 1983)

Career NFL statistics
- Sacks: 3.5
- Interceptions: 10
- Fumble recoveries: 9
- Stats at Pro Football Reference
- College Football Hall of Fame

Gary Phillip Reasons (born February 18, 1962) is an American former professional football player who was a linebacker in the National Football League (NFL). He played college football for the Northwestern State Demons from 1980 to 1983 and was the first player chosen as a first-team Division I-AA All-America team in three consecutive years. He also played professional football in the NFL for the New York Giants (1984–1991) and Cincinnati Bengals (1992). He played on the Giants teams that won Super Bowl XXI and Super Bowl XXV. Reasons later worked as a college football television analyst and sideline reporter for ABC/ESPN and Fox Sports Southwest. He has been inducted into the College Football Hall of Fame and the Louisiana Sports Hall of Fame.

== Early life ==
Reasons was born in 1962 in Chicago. He grew up in Texas and attended Crowley High School in Crowley, Texas. He played at linebacker and tight end for the Crowley football team and played other sports as well, earning a total of 13 varsity letters from 1976 to 1980.

== Northwestern State ==
Reasons attended Northwestern State University in Natchitoches, Louisiana. He played college football as a linebacker for the Northwestern State Demons football team from 1980 to 1983. He set Northwestern State records for most tackles in a game (24), a season (172) and in a career (394). He was the first player to be named three times to the Division I-AA All-America team selected by the American Football Coaches Association (AFCA). As a senior, he was selected as a third-team All-American by Gannett News Service, an honor that typically only goes to Division I-A players.

== NFL ==
Reasons was selected by the New York Giants in the fourth round (105th overall pick) of the 1984 NFL draft. He played for the Giants for eight years from 1984 to 1991, appearing in 122 games, including 80 as a starter. In December 1989, Reasons made a diving tackle against Bobby Humphrey of the Denver Broncos in the snow at Mile High Stadium in Denver. Reasons stopped Humphrey short of the goal-line, and the Giants won the game, helping them advance to the playoffs. Three years later, The New York Times published an article about the hit, writing,

Reasons, a Giant linebacker, tackled a man with his head. In fact, his head tackled the other guy's head in midair. It was such a spectacular collision that, Reasons said, people still exclaim about it.

Reasons also made a notable play during the 1990 NFC Championship Game against the San Francisco 49ers, running for 30 yards on a fourth-quarter fake punt play, which helped the Giants win 15-13 and advance to Super Bowl XXV.

In early 1992, the Giants did not include Reasons on their 37-man Plan B protected list. He returned to the Giants but injured his knee during training camp and was released on injury settlement. He signed with the Cincinnati Bengals in September 1992. He appeared in 12 games for the Bengals, nine as a starter, in 1992.

Reasons played in the NFL for nine seasons, appeared in 134 games, and totaled 10 interceptions, 137 interception return yards, nine fumble recoveries, and three-and-a-half sacks.

== Honors ==
Reasons has received multiple honors for his football career, including the following:

- In 1984, Northwestern State retired his No. 34 jersey, one of only three to have been retired by the school.
- On April 5, 1991, Reasons was honored by the Northwestern State and city of Natchitoches with the celebration of "Gary Reasons Day". As part of the celebration, he was enshrined in the Natchitoches "Walk of Honor".
- Reasons was inducted into the College Football Hall of Fame in 1996. He was inducted as part of the first group of players from smaller schools.
- He was also inducted into Northwestern State's N-Club Hall of Fame in 1996.
- In 1997, he was also inducted into the Louisiana Sports Hall of Fame.

== Later life ==
Reasons married Terri Matthews, and they had three children: Nicholas, Randi, and Lacy. He owned and operated a company that supplied amusement machines to restaurants, clubs, and arcades in the Houston ara.

Reasons was also the owner and president of the Oklahoma City Yard Dawgz of the AF2 arena football league. He also served as the team's head coach in 2004 and again in 2008.

Reasons also worked for more than 20 years as a college football game analyst, color commentator, and sideline reporter for ABC/ESPN and Fox Sports Southwest.

== Head coaching record ==
Team	Year	Regular season				Postseason			
Team	Year	Won	Lost	Win %	Finish	Won	Lost	Win %	Result
OKC	2004	10	6	.625	2nd in Southwest	0	1	.000	Lost to Peoria Pirates in wild card round
OKC	2008	1	5	.167	resigned mid-season	0	0	.000	–
Total		11	11	.500		0	1	.000	
