= 1999 Nebraska Cornhuskers football team =

American college football season

1999 Nebraska Cornhuskers football

Big 12 champion Big 12 North Division co-champion Fiesta Bowl champion

Big 12 Championship Game, W 22–6 vs. Texas

Fiesta Bowl, W 31–21 vs. Tennessee
- Conference: Big 12 Conference
- North Division

Ranking
- Coaches: No. 2
- AP: No. 3
- Record: 12–1 (7–1 Big 12)
- Head coach: Frank Solich (2nd season)
- Offensive scheme: I formation
- Defensive coordinator: Charlie McBride (19th season)
- Base defense: 4–3
- Home stadium: Memorial Stadium

1999 Big 12 Conference football standings
	Conf.			Overall
Team	W		L	W		L
North Division
No. 3 Nebraska xy$	7	–	1	12	–	1
No. 6 Kansas State x	7	–	1	11	–	1
Colorado	5	–	3	7	–	5
Kansas	3	–	5	5	–	7
Iowa State	1	–	7	4	–	7
Missouri	1	–	7	4	–	7
South Division
No. 21 Texas xy	6	–	2	9	–	5
Oklahoma	5	–	3	7	–	5
Texas Tech	5	–	3	6	–	5
No. 23 Texas A&M	5	–	3	8	–	4
Oklahoma State	3	–	5	5	–	6
Baylor	0	–	8	1	–	10
Championship: Nebraska 22, Texas 6
$ – BCS representative as conference champion; x – Division champion/co-champions; y – Championship game participant; Rankings from AP Poll

The 1999 Nebraska Cornhuskers football team represented the University of Nebraska–Lincoln as a member of the North Division of the Big 12 Conference during the 1999 NCAA Division I-A football season. Led by second-year head coach Frank Solich, the Cornhuskers compiled an overall record of 12–1 with a mark of 7–1 in conference play, sharing the Big 12's North Division title with Kansas State. By virtue of a head-to-head win over the Wildcats, Nebraska advanced to the Big 12 Championship Game, where the Cornhuskers avenged their one loss during the regular season, defeating Texas to capture in the conference championship. Nebraska was then invited to the Fiesta Bowl, where the Cornhuskers beat Tennessee. The team played home games at Memorial Stadium in Lincoln, Nebraska.

Nebraska's Big 12 title was 43rd conference championship overall for the program, and remains Nebraska's most recent one through the 2025 season.

== Schedule ==
Date	Time	Opponent	Rank	Site	TV	Result	Attendance	Source
September 4	11:00 am	at Iowa*	No. 5	Kinnick Stadium; Iowa City, IA (rivalry)	ABC	W 42–7	70,397	
September 11	2:30 pm	California*	No. 5	Memorial Stadium; Lincoln, NE	ABC	W 45–0	77,617	
September 18	11:30 am	Southern Miss*	No. 4	Memorial Stadium; Lincoln, NE	PPV	W 20–13	77,826	
September 25	6:00 pm	at Missouri	No. 6	Faurot Field; Columbia, MO (rivalry)	FSN	W 40–10	68,174	
October 2	11:30 am	Oklahoma State	No. 6	Memorial Stadium; Lincoln, NE	FSN	W 38–14	77,740	
October 9	6:00 pm	Iowa State^{†}	No. 4	Memorial Stadium; Lincoln, NE (rivalry)	FSN	W 49–14	77,743	
October 23	2:30 pm	at No. 18 Texas	No. 3	Darrell K Royal–Texas Memorial Stadium; Austin, TX (College GameDay)	ABC	L 20–24	84,082	
October 30	6:00 pm	at Kansas	No. 8	Memorial Stadium; Lawrence, KS (rivalry)	FSN	W 24–17	45,100	
November 6	2:30 pm	No. 21 Texas A&M	No. 9	Memorial Stadium; Lincoln, NE	ABC	W 37–0	77,705	
November 13	2:30 pm	No. 5 Kansas State	No. 7	Memorial Stadium; Lincoln, NE (rivalry)	ABC	W 41–15	77,744	
November 26	1:30 pm	at Colorado	No. 3	Folsom Field; Boulder, CO (rivalry)	ABC	W 33–30 ^{OT}	52,946	
December 4	7:00 pm	vs. No. 12 Texas	No. 3	Alamodome; San Antonio, TX (Big 12 Championship Game)	ABC	W 22–6	65,063	
January 2, 2000	7:00 pm	vs. No. 6 Tennessee*	No. 3	Sun Devil Stadium; Tempe, AZ (Fiesta Bowl)	ABC	W 31–21	71,526	
*Non-conference game; ^{†}Homecoming; Rankings from AP Poll released prior to the game; All times are in Central time

== Rankings ==
Ranking movements Legend: ██ Increase in ranking ██ Decrease in ranking
	Week																
Poll	Pre	1	2	3	4	5	6	7	8	9	10	11	12	13	14	15	Final
AP	6	5	5	4	6	6	4	3	3	8	9	7	4	3	3	3	3
Coaches	6	6	6	6	5	5	4	3	3	9	9	6	4	3	3	3	2
BCS	Not released									7	8	6	3	3	3	3	Not released

== Game summaries ==
=== Iowa ===
Nebraska at Iowa

Team	1	2	3	4	Total
• Nebraska	0	7	14	21	42
Iowa	0	0	0	7	7

- Date: September 4
- Location: Kinnick Stadium, Iowa City, Iowa
- Game start: 12:00 CST
- Game attendance: 70,397
- TV announcers (ABC): Roger Twibell, Bob Griese, & Todd Harris

=== California ===
California at Nebraska

Team	1	2	3	4	Total
California	0	0	0	0	0
• Nebraska	7	21	10	7	45

- Date: September 11
- Location: Memorial Stadium, Lincoln, Nebraska
- Game start: 3:30 CST
- Game attendance: 77,617
- TV announcers (ABC): Keith Jackson, Bob Griese, & Todd Harris

=== Southern Miss ===
'Southern Miss at Nebraska

Team	1	2	3	4	Total
Southern Miss	7	0	6	0	13
• Nebraska	6	6	8	0	20

- Date: September 18
- Location: Memorial Stadium, Lincoln, Nebraska
- Game attendance: 77,826

=== Missouri ===
Nebraska at Missouri

Team	1	2	3	4	Total
• Nebraska	16	3	14	7	40
Missouri	0	3	0	7	10

- Date: September 25
- Location: Faurot Field, Columbia, Missouri
- Game start: 7:00 CST
- Game attendance: 68,174
- TV announcers (FSN): Ron Thulin, Artie Gigantino, & Eric Clemons

=== Oklahoma State ===
Oklahoma State at Nebraska

Team	1	2	3	4	Total
Oklahoma State	0	0	7	7	14
• Nebraska	21	10	7	0	38

- Date: October 2
- Location: Memorial Stadium, Lincoln, Nebraska
- Game start: 12:30 CST
- Game attendance: 77,740
- TV announcers (FSN): Drew Goodman, Keith Jackson, & Jim Knox

=== Iowa State ===
Iowa State at Nebraska

Team	1	2	3	4	Total
Iowa State	0	0	0	14	14
• Nebraska	21	7	14	7	49

- Date: October 9
- Location: Memorial Stadium, Lincoln, Nebraska
- Game start: 7:00 CST
- Game attendance: 77,743
- TV announcers (FSN): Ron Thulin, Artie Gigantino, & Eric Clemons

=== Texas ===
Nebraska at Texas

Team	1	2	3	4	Total
Nebraska	0	13	0	7	20
• Texas	3	0	14	7	24

- Date: October 23
- Location: Darrell K Royal–Texas Memorial Stadium, Austin, Texas
- Game start: 3:30 CST
- Game attendance: 84,082
- TV announcers (ABC): Brent Musburger, Gary Danielson, & Jack Arute

=== Kansas ===
Nebraska at Kansas

Team	1	2	3	4	Total
• Nebraska	0	0	10	14	24
Kansas	2	7	0	8	17

- Date: October 30
- Location: Memorial Stadium, Lawrence, Kansas
- Game start: 7:00 CST
- Game attendance: 45,100
- TV announcers (FSN): Ron Thulin, Artie Gigantino, & Eric Clemons

=== Texas A&M ===
Texas A&M at Nebraska

Team	1	2	3	4	Total
Texas A&M	0	0	0	0	0
• Nebraska	0	6	17	14	37

- Date: November 6
- Location: Memorial Stadium, Lincoln, Nebraska
- Game start: 3:30 CST
- Game attendance: 77,705
- TV announcers (ABC): Brent Musburger, Gary Danielson, & Jack Arute

=== Kansas State ===
Kansas State at Nebraska

Team	1	2	3	4	Total
Kansas State	0	9	0	6	15
• Nebraska	16	8	0	17	41

- Date: November 13
- Location: Memorial Stadium, Lincoln, Nebraska
- Game start: 3:30 CST
- Game attendance: 77,744
- TV announcers (ABC): Brad Nessler, Bob Griese, & Lynn Swann

=== Colorado ===
Nebraska at Colorado

Team	1	2	3	4	OT	Total
• Nebraska	14	10	3	0	6	33
Colorado	0	3	0	24	3	30

- Date: November 26
- Location: Folsom Field, Boulder, Colorado
- Game start: 2:30 CST
- Game attendance: 52,946
- TV announcers (ABC): Brad Nessler, Bob Griese, & Steve Cyphers

=== Texas ===
Texas vs Nebraska

Team	1	2	3	4	Total
Texas	0	0	0	6	6
• Nebraska	10	5	7	0	22

- Date: December 4
- Location: Alamodome, San Antonio, Texas
- Game start: 4:30 CST
- Game attendance: 65,063
- TV announcers (ABC): Brent Musburger, Gary Danielson, & Jack Arute

=== Tennessee ===
Tennessee vs Nebraska

Team	1	2	3	4	Total
Tennessee	0	7	7	7	21
• Nebraska	14	3	7	7	31

- Date: January 2
- Location: Sun Devil Stadium, Tempe, Arizona
- Game start: 7:30 CST
- Game attendance: 71,526
- TV announcers (ABC): Tim Brant, Dean Blevins, & Leslie Gudel

== Personnel ==
=== Roster ===
1999 Nebraska Cornhuskers football team roster
Players
Coaches
Offense }

Pos.	#	Name	Class
SE	17	Scott Aguglia	So
IB	41	Matt Albertson	Fr
IB	38	Dan Alexander	Jr
G	64	Steve Altstadt	So
WB	82	Sean Applegate	Sr
C	51	Matt Baldwin	Sr
TE	94	Damien Bauman	Sr
WB	81	Jeremy Bender	Fr
SE	20	Tom Beveridge	Jr
TE	84	Jon Bowling	Fr
IB	36	Correll Buckhalter	Jr
IB	39	Chad Buller	Fr
IB	34	Chris Butler	Fr
QB	10	Joe Chrisman	Fr
G	59	Wes Cody	Fr
SE	93	Kelly Cook	Fr
WB	86	Ben Cornelsen	Fr
QB	7	Eric Crouch	So
TE	91	Will Dabbert	Fr
FB	34	Judd Davies	Fr
IB	24	Josh Davis	Fr
SE	3	Matt Davison	Jr
C	74	Jon Dawson	Fr
TE	85	T.J. DeBates	Sr
IB	30	Dahrran Diedrick	Fr
OT	76	Billy Diekmann	Jr
IB	4	DeAngelo Evans	Jr
G	77	Toniu Fonoti	Fr
WB	14	Austin Forster	Fr
WB	8	John Gibson	Jr
TE	99	Aaron Golliday	Fr
FB	46	Nick Gragert	So
G	74	Mike Green	So
OT	75	Tim Green	Fr
IB	6	DeAntae Grixby	Fr
SE	92	Seth Gutz	Jr
G	61	Andy Gwennap	Fr
OT	73	Brian Hale	Fr
WB	18	Troy Hassebroek	Fr
C	78	Aaron Havlovic	Sr
SE	80	Larry Henderson	Sr
G	55	Russ Hochstein	Jr
FB	32	Casey Hughes	Fr
TE	82	Trevor Johnson	Fr
OT	69	Adam Julch	Sr
FB	40	Paul Kastl	Fr
FB	22	Ben Kingston	Sr
WB	21	John Klem	Fr
OT	67	Scott Koethe	Fr
OT	75	Kyle Kollmorgen	So
C	71	David Kolowski	Fr
OT	67	Nate Kolterman	Fr
WB	95	Paul Kosch	Fr
WB	92	Tim Liley	Fr
G		Jack Limbaugh	Fr
SE	28	Brett Lindstrom	Fr
WB	1	Frankie London	Sr
G	71	Chris Loos	Fr
QB	10	Jammal Lord	Fr
WB	33	Dwayne McClary	Jr
SE	33	Luke McGowen	Fr
TE	90	Jake McKee	Jr
IB	20	Robin Miller	Fr
FB	15	Willie Miller	Jr
FB		Justin Montgomery	Fr
TE	43	John Murphy	Jr
OT	62	Brian Nelson	Fr
QB	12	Bobby Newcombe	Jr
SE	23	Ryan Ommert	Fr
QB	14	Jeff Perino	Sr
FB	37	Hank Piening	Jr
FB	42	Kevin Pitts	Fr
WB	81	Matt Plooster	Fr
C	54	Dominic Raiola	So
IB	46	Tim Reese	Fr
QB	16	Jay Runty	Jr
G	66	Jon Rutherford	So
G	79	Chris Saalfeld	Jr
OT	65	Jason Schwab	Sr
G	63	James Sherman	Sr
C	53	Matt Shook	Fr
OT	72	Leif Sidwell	Fr
WB	25	Stuart Siegel	Fr
TE	95	Sean Steenson	Fr
G	57	Dan Swantek	So
SE	9	Wilson Thomas	RFr
SE	47	Fred Thorne	Fr
IB	24	Alik Tillery	So
FB	35	Tyrone Uhlir	Fr
OT	68	Dan Vili Waldrop	Fr
OT	71	Cody Volk	Fr
OT	58	Dave Volk	So
OT	77	Mike Wilford	Fr
TE	87	Tracey Wistrom	So
G	76	Matt Witulski	Fr

Defense

Pos.	#	Name	Class
RE	98	Demoine Adams	RFr
WLB		Blake Anderson	Fr
LCB	28	Josh Anderson	Jr
SLB	41	Rod Baker	Jr
DT	59	Ryon Bingham	Fr
FS	15	Rob Blomeier	Fr
ROV	4	Mic Boettner	So
FS	14	Dion Booker	So
NT	61	Andy Bowman	Fr
ROV	21	Mike Brown	Sr
RCB	22	Ralph Brown	Sr
SLB	49	Brad Bryan	Fr
MLB	39	Ben Buettenback	Sr
MLB	48	Jamie Burrow	So
NT	55	Jon Clanton	RFr
MLB	52	Jon Coyne	So
LCB	3	Keyuo Craver	So
ROV	2	Mike Demps	RFr
RE	85	Chris Estudillo	Fr
RE	64	Lee File	Fr
FS	19	Clint Finley	Jr
ROV	38	Eric Fischer	Jr
WLB	58	Gabe Fries	RFr
RE/DT	52	John Garrison	Fr
ROV	1	Taylor Gehman	Fr
RCB	5	DeJuan Groce	Fr
RE	97	Matt Grummert	Jr
LCB	14	Kevin Guse	Fr
FS	45	Brad Hamik	Jr
RCB	18	Jeff Hemje	So
SLB	51	Anthony Hoke	Fr
LCB	24	Matt Ickes	So
WLB	50	Julius Jackson	Sr
WLB		Blanchard Johnson	Fr
WLB	27	Eric Johnson	Sr
RE	94	Patrick Kabongo	Fr
DT	91	Loran Kaiser	Jr
RE	57	Chris Kelsay	Fr
WLB	47	Josh Kohl	Sr
RCB		Cali Lemelle	Fr
ROV	29	Gregg List	Sr
NT	70	Jason Lohr	So
RE	86	Jeremy Lyman	RFr
MLB	54	Mike Makris	Fr
DT	94	Stephen Manning	RFr
DT	71	Matt McGinn	So
FS	32	Greg McGraw	Sr
WLB	58	Tim Miller	Fr
RE	93	Brandon Mooberry	Jr
RCB	7	Christopher Moran	Sr
RCB	35	Don Neal	Fr
DT	87	Casey Nelson	So
NT	62	Jeff Nelson	RFr
SLB	37	Tony Ortiz	Sr
RE	84	Spencer Owen	Fr
NT	78	Phil Peetz	Fr
SLB	44	Jon Penny	So
NT	63	Chad Peterson	Fr
FS	12	Jerrell Pippens	Fr
MLB	13	Carlos Polk	Jr
ROV	10	Brandon Quindt	Jr
LCB	31	Tyler Rauenzahn	Fr
SLB	23	Steve Raymond	Sr
RCB	6	Pat Ricketts	Fr
RE	85	Kyle Ringenberg	RFr
RE	80	Eric Ryan	Sr
MLB	12	Steve Safranek	Fr
FS	11	Carl Scholting	Fr
SLB	43	Scott Shanle	RFr
LCB	48	Ronjiel Sharpe	Fr
SLB	46	Brian Shaw	Sr
DT	56	Jeremy Slechta	So
WLB		Jemond Smith	RFr
RE	92	Justin Smith	RFr
MLB	40	Luke Smith	RFr
WLB	34	Randy Stella	RFr
LCB	16	Erwin Swiney	Jr
NT	92	Junior Tagoa'i	Fr
MLB	90	Tony Tata	RFr
FS	8	Aaron Terpening	RFr
RE	83	Kyle Vanden Bosch	Jr
SLB	21	Chuck Vander Linden	Fr
WLB	9	Mark Vedral	So
ROV	25	Joe Walker	Jr
NT	96	Steve Warren	Sr
RE	82	Adrian Warrior	Fr
ROV	42	Troy Watchorn	Jr
RE	95	J.P. (John Paul) Wichmann	So
LCB	1	Donn Williams	Fr
RE	81	Aaron Wills	Sr
RE	88	Colin Wills	Fr
ROV	20	Wes Woodward	So

Special teams

Pos.	#	Name	Class
PK	26	Josh Brown	Fr
P	17	Dan Hadenfeldt	Sr
P	18	Kyle Larson	Fr
PK	28	Chace Long	Jr
P/PK	88	Chuck Tack	So

Head coach

- Frank Solich
  2nd season
  21st year at Nebraska
  Alma mater: Nebraska

Coordinators/assistant coaches

- Charlie McBride
  19th season as DC/DL coach
  23rd year at Nebraska
  Alma mater: Colorado
- Turner Gill
  8th season as QB coach
  8th year at Nebraska
  Alma mater: Nebraska
- Craig Bohl
  5th season as LB coach
  8th year at Nebraska
  Alma mater: Nebraska
- Ron Brown
  13th season as WR/TE coach
  13th year at Nebraska
  Alma mater: Brown
- Dan Young
  17th season as OL/K coach
  17th year at Nebraska
  Alma mater: Reed
- Milt Tenopir
  26th season as OL coach
  26th year at Nebraska
  Alma mater: Sterling
- Nelson Barnes
  3rd season as RE coach
  3rd year at Nebraska
  Alma mater: North Texas
- George Darlington
  DB coach
  27th year at Nebraska
  Alma mater: Rutgers
- Dave Gillespie
  2nd season as RB coach
  11th year at Nebraska
  Alma mater: Nebraska-Omaha
- Boyd Epley
  31st season as S&C coach
  31st year at Nebraska
  Alma mater: Nebraska

Legend

- (C) Team captain
- (S) Suspended
- (I) Ineligible
- Injured
- Redshirt

Roster
Last update: January 17, 2011

=== Depth chart ===
Defense

FS
Clint Finley
Dion Booker
Greg McGraw

WILL	MIKE	SAM
Eric Johnson; Julius Jackson	Carlos Polk	Tony Ortiz; Brian Shaw
Randy Stella	Jamie Burrow	Scott Shanle
Mark Vedral	Ben Buettenback	Rod Baker

ROVER
Mike Brown
Joe Walker
Gregg List

CB
Keyuo Craver
DeJuan Groce
Donn Williams

DE	DT	DT	DE
Kyle Vanden Bosch	Steve Warren	Loran Kaiser	Aaron Willis
Demoine Adams	Jason Lohr	Jeremy Slechta	Chris Kelsay
J.P. Wichmann; Eric Ryan	Jon Clanton	Matt McGinn	Justin Smith

CB
Ralph Brown
Jeff Hemje
Josh Anderson

Offense

WR
Matt Davison
Wilson Thomas
Tom Beveridge

LT	LG	C	RG	RT
Adam Julch	James Sherman	Dominic Raiola	Russ Hochstein	Dave Volk
Jon Rutherford	Toniu Fonoti	Matt Baldwin	Steve Alstadt	Kyle Kollmorgen
Billy Diekmann	Wes Cody	Aaron Havlovic	Chris Saalfeld	Scott Koethe

TE
Tracey Wistrom
T.J DeBates
Aaron Golliday
Jon Bowling

WR
Bobby Newcombe
Sean Applegate
John Gibson

QB
Eric Crouch
Bobby Newcombe
Joe Chirsman

RB
Dan Alexander
Correll Buckhalter
Dahrran Diedrick

FB
Willie Miller
Ben Kingston
Tyrone Uhlir

Special teams
PK Josh Brown
P Dan Hadenfeldt
KR Joe Walker
PR Bobby Newcombe

== Awards ==
Award	Name(s)
All-American 1st Team	Ralph Brown, Mike Brown, Dominic Raiola, Dan Hadenfeldt, Brian Shaw
All-American 2nd Team	Steve Warren
Big 12 Offensive Player of the Year	Eric Crouch
All-Big 12 1st team	Mike Brown, Ralph Brown, Eric Crouch, Russ Hochstein, Bobby Newcombe, Carlos Polk, Dominic Raiola, Steve Warren, Tracey Wistrom
All-Big 12 2nd team	Dan Hadenfeldt, Julius Jackson, Kyle Vanden Bosch
All-Big 12 honorable mention	Keyuo Craver, Matt Davison, Dave Volk
Big 12 coach of the Year	Frank Solich

== NFL and pro players ==
The following Nebraska players who participated in the 1999 season later moved on to the next level and joined a professional or semi-pro team as draftees or free agents.

Name	Team
Demoine Adams	Edmonton Eskimos
Dan Alexander	Tennessee Titans
Damien Bauman	New Orleans VooDoo
Ryon Bingham	San Diego Chargers
Josh Brown	Seattle Seahawks
Mike Brown	Chicago Bears
Ralph Brown	New York Giants
Correll Buckhalter	Philadelphia Eagles
Keyuo Craver	New Orleans Saints
Eric Crouch	St. Louis Rams
Josh Davis	New York Jets
Clint Finley	Kansas City Chiefs
Toniu Fonoti	San Diego Chargers
Aaron Golliday	Scottish Claymores
DeJuan Groce	St. Louis Rams
Russ Hochstein	Tampa Bay Buccaneers
Eric Johnson	Oakland Raiders
Trevor Johnson	New York Jets
Patrick Kabongo	Detroit Lions
Chris Kelsay	Buffalo Bills
Kyle Larson	Cincinnati Bengals
Jammal Lord	Houston Texans
Bobby Newcombe	Montreal Alouettes
Tony Ortiz	Scottish Claymores
Jerrell Pippens	Chicago Bears
Carlos Polk	San Diego Chargers
Dominic Raiola	Detroit Lions
Scott Shanle	St. Louis Rams
Jeremy Slechta	Philadelphia Eagles
Erwin Swiney	Green Bay Packers
Kyle Vanden Bosch	Arizona Cardinals
Joe Walker	Tennessee Titans
Steve Warren	Green Bay Packers
