= 2000 Nebraska Cornhuskers football team =

American college football season

2000 Nebraska Cornhuskers football

Big 12 North co-champion Alamo Bowl champion

Alamo Bowl, W 66–17 vs. Northwestern
- Conference: Big 12 Conference
- North Division

Ranking
- Coaches: No. 7
- AP: No. 8
- Record: 10–2 (6–2 Big 12)
- Head coach: Frank Solich (3rd season)
- Offensive scheme: I formation
- Defensive coordinator: Craig Bohl (1st season)
- Base defense: 4–3
- Home stadium: Memorial Stadium

2000 Big 12 Conference football standings
	Conf.			Overall
Team	W		L	W		L
North Division
No. 9 Kansas State xy	6	–	2	11	–	3
No. 8 Nebraska x	6	–	2	10	–	2
No. 25 Iowa State	5	–	3	9	–	3
Colorado	3	–	5	3	–	8
Kansas	2	–	6	4	–	7
Missouri	2	–	6	3	–	8
South Division
No. 1 Oklahoma x$#	8	–	0	13	–	0
No. 12 Texas	7	–	1	9	–	3
Texas A&M	5	–	3	7	–	5
Texas Tech	3	–	5	7	–	6
Oklahoma State	1	–	7	3	–	8
Baylor	0	–	8	2	–	9
Championship: Oklahoma 27, Kansas State 24
# – BCS National Champion; $ – BCS representative as conference champion; x – Division champion/co-champions; y – Championship game participant; Rankings from AP Poll

The 2000 Nebraska Cornhuskers football team represented the University of Nebraska–Lincoln as a member of the North Division of the Big 12 Conference during the 2000 NCAA Division I-A football season. Led by third-year head coach Frank Solich, the Cornhuskers compiled an overall record of 10–2 with a mark of 6–2 in conference play, sharing the Big 12's North Division with Kansas State. By virtue of a head-to-head loss to the Wildcats, Nebraska was left out of the Big 12 Championship Game. The Cornhuskers were invited to the Alamo Bowl, where they defeated Northwestern. The team played home games at Memorial Stadium in Lincoln, Nebraska.

The Cornhusker's 2000 Red-White spring game featured Nebraska's first (and currently only) female player: KaLena "Beanie" Barnes, a senior sprinter for Nebraska's women's track-and-field teams, played in spring practice as a punter and recorded one 35-yard punt. She did not stay with the team for the regular season.

== Schedule ==
Date	Time	Opponent	Rank	Site	TV	Result	Attendance
September 2	11:30 am	San José State*	No. 1	Memorial Stadium; Lincoln, NE	PPV	W 49–13	77,728
September 9	1:30 pm	at No. 23 Notre Dame*	No. 1	Notre Dame Stadium; Notre Dame, IN (rivalry, College GameDay)	NBC	W 27–24 ^{OT}	80,232
September 23	2:30 pm	Iowa*	No. 1	Memorial Stadium; Lincoln, NE (rivalry)	ABC	W 42–13	78,070
September 30	6:00 pm	Missouri	No. 1	Memorial Stadium; Lincoln, NE (rivalry)	FSN	W 42–24	77,744
October 7	2:30 pm	at Iowa State	No. 2	Jack Trice Stadium; Ames, IA (rivalry)	ABC	W 49–27	50,074
October 14	6:00 pm	at Texas Tech	No. 1	Jones SBC Stadium; Lubbock, TX	FSN	W 56–3	48,961
October 21	1:00 pm	Baylor	No. 1	Memorial Stadium; Lincoln, NE		W 59–0	77,959
October 28	11:00 am	at No. 3 Oklahoma	No. 1	Oklahoma Memorial Stadium; Norman, OK (rivalry College GameDay)	ABC	L 14–31	75,989
November 4	2:30 pm	Kansas^{†}	No. 5	Memorial Stadium; Lincoln, NE (rivalry)	ABC	W 56–17	78,096
November 11	6:00 pm	at No. 16 Kansas State	No. 4	KSU Stadium; Manhattan, KS (rivalry)	FSN	L 28–29	53,811
November 24	11:00 am	Colorado	No. 10	Memorial Stadium; Lincoln, NE (rivalry)	ABC	W 34–32	77,672
December 30	7:00 pm	vs. No. 18 Northwestern*	No. 9	Alamodome; San Antonio, TX (Alamo Bowl)	ESPN	W 66–17	60,028
*Non-conference game; ^{†}Homecoming; Rankings from AP Poll released prior to the game; All times are in Central time

== Rankings ==
Ranking movements Legend: ██ Increase in ranking ██ Decrease in ranking ( ) = First-place votes
	Week																
Poll	Pre	1	2	3	4	5	6	7	8	9	10	11	12	13	14	15	Final
AP	1 (36)	1 (35)	1 (39)	1 (41)	1 (43)	1 (39)	2 (28)	1 (67)	1 (66)	1 (67)	5	4	10	9	10	9	8
Coaches	1 (36)	1 (40)	1 (43)	1 (48)	1 (44)	1 (44)	1 (37)	1 (53)	1 (57)	1 (58)	6	5	10	8	9	8	7
BCS	Not released									1	4	4	8	8	8	8	Not released

== Game summaries ==
=== San Jose State ===
San Jose State at Nebraska

Team	1	2	3	4	Total
San José State	6	0	7	0	13
• Nebraska	14	14	14	7	49

- Date: September 2
- Location: Memorial Stadium, Lincoln, Nebraska
- Game attendance: 77,728
- TV announcers (PPV): Warren Swain (play-by-play) & Adrian Fiala (color)

=== Notre Dame ===
Nebraska at Notre Dame

Team	1	2	3	4	OT	Total
• Nebraska	7	7	7	0	6	27
Notre Dame	0	7	7	7	3	24

- Date: September 9
- Location: Notre Dame Stadium, Notre Dame, Indiana
- Game attendance: 80,232
- TV announcers (NBC): Craig Minervini (play-by-play), Pat Haden (color) & Bob Wischusen (sideline)

=== Iowa ===
Iowa at Nebraska [box score]

Team	1	2	3	4	Total
Iowa	7	6	0	0	13
• Nebraska	7	14	7	14	42

- Date: September 23
- Location: Memorial Stadium, Lincoln, Nebraska
- Game attendance: 78,070
- TV announcers (ABC): Sean McDonough (play-by-play) & Ed Cunningham (color)

=== Missouri ===
Missouri at Nebraska [box score]

Team	1	2	3	4	Total
Missouri	7	7	10	0	24
• Nebraska	7	21	7	7	42

- Date: September 30
- Location: Memorial Stadium, Lincoln, Nebraska
- Game attendance: 77,744
- TV announcers (FSN): Ron Thulin (play-by-play), James Lofton (color) & Eric Clemons (sideline)

=== Iowa State ===
Nebraska at Iowa State

Team	1	2	3	4	Total
• Nebraska	0	13	8	28	49
Iowa State	7	7	6	7	27

- Date: October 7
- Location: Jack Trice Stadium, Ames, Iowa
- Game attendance: 50,074
- TV announcers (ABC): Chip Tarkenton (play-by-play) & Reggie Rivers (color)

=== Texas Tech ===
Nebraska at Texas Tech

Team	1	2	3	4	Total
• Nebraska	14	14	7	21	56
Texas Tech	0	0	3	0	3

- Date: October 14
- Location: Jones SBC Stadium, Lubbock, Texas
- Game attendance: 48,961
- TV announcers (FSN): Ron Thulin (play-by-play), James Lofton (color) & Eric Clemons (sideline)

=== Baylor ===
Baylor at Nebraska

Team	1	2	3	4	Total
Baylor	0	0	0	0	0
• Nebraska	38	14	7	0	59

- Date: October 21
- Location: Memorial Stadium, Lincoln, Nebraska
- Game attendance: 77,959

=== Oklahoma ===
Nebraska at Oklahoma

Team	1	2	3	4	Total
Nebraska	14	0	0	0	14
• Oklahoma	0	24	7	0	31

- Date: October 19
- Location: Oklahoma Memorial Stadium, Norman, Oklahoma
- Game attendance: 75,989
- TV announcers (ABC): Brad Nessler (play-by-play), Bob Griese (color) & Lynn Swann (sideline)

=== Kansas ===
Kansas at Nebraska

Team	1	2	3	4	Total
Kansas	0	3	0	14	17
• Nebraska	21	14	14	7	56

- Date: November 4
- Location: Memorial Stadium, Lincoln, Nebraska
- Game attendance: 78,096
- TV announcers (ABC): Brad Nessler (play-by-play), Bob Griese (color) & Lynn Swann (sideline)

=== Kansas State ===
Nebraska at Kansas State

Team	1	2	3	4	Total
Nebraska	14	0	0	14	28
• Kansas State	7	10	6	6	29

- Date: November 11
- Location: KSU Stadium, Manhattan, Kansas
- Game attendance: 53,811
- TV announcers (FSN): Ron Thulin (play-by-play), James Lofton (color) & Eric Clemons (sideline)

=== Colorado ===
Colorado at Nebraska [box score]

Team	1	2	3	4	Total
Colorado	0	10	7	15	32
• Nebraska	14	0	7	13	34

- Date: November 24
- Location: Memorial Stadium, Lincoln, Nebraska
- Game attendance: 77,672
- TV announcers (ABC): Brad Nessler (play-by-play), Bob Griese (color) & Lynn Swann (sideline)

=== Northwestern ===
Nebraska vs Northwestern

Team	1	2	3	4	Total
• Nebraska	7	31	21	7	66
Northwestern	3	14	0	0	17

- Date: December 30
- Location: Alamodome, San Antonio, Texas
- Game attendance: 60,028
- TV announcers (ESPN): Dave Barnett (play-by-play), Bill Curry (color), Mike Golic (color) & Michele Tafoya (sideline)

== Personnel ==
=== Roster ===
2000 Nebraska Cornhuskers football team roster
Players
Coaches
Offense

Pos.	#	Name	Class
IB	40	Matt Albertson	So
IB	38	Dan Alexander	Sr
G	64	Steve Altstadt	Jr
G	70	Jake Andersen	Fr
SE	20	Tom Beveridge	Sr
TE	84	Jon Bowling	So
IB	36	Correll Buckhalter	Sr
QB	11	Joe Chrisman	So
G	59	Wes Cody	So
IB	1	Thunder Collins	Jr
SE	32	Kelly Cook	RFr
WB	81	Ben Cornelsen	So
QB	7	Eric Crouch	Jr
TE	82	Will Dabbert	So
FB	4	Judd Davies	RFr
IB	27	Josh Davis	RFr
SE	3	Matt Davison	Sr
G	50	Jon Dawson	Fr
IB	30	Dahrran Diedrick	So
G	78	Mike Erickson	Fr
OT	64	M.J. Flaum	Fr
G	77	Toniu Fonoti	So
C	52	John Garrison	So
WB	8	John Gibson	Sr
TE	99	Aaron Golliday	So
FB	49	Nick Gragert	Jr
OT	72	Tim Green	RFr
IB	6	DeAntae Grixby	So
SE	80	Seth Gutz	Sr
G	62	Andy Gwennap	So
G	71	Brian Hale	RFr
WB	89	Troy Hassebroek	So
G	55	Russ Hochstein	Sr
SE	34	Jason Jisa	Fr
TE	88	Trevor Johnson	RFr
FB	37	Paul Kastl	So
TE	42	Dusty Keiser	Fr
WB	19	John Klem	So
OT	73	Scott Koethe	So
OT	75	Kyle Kollmorgen	Jr
C	74	David Kolowski	So
OT	67	Nate Kolterman	So
FB	39	Steve Kriewald	Fr
SE	28	Tim Liley	RFr
G	63	Jack Limbaugh	RFr
QB	14	Brett Lindstrom	RFr
WB	5	DeWayne Long	Fr
G	76	Chris Loos	RFr
QB	10	Jammal Lord	RFr
WB	33	Luke McGowan	RFr
TE	90	Jake McKee	Sr
SE	16	Ryan Mikluscak	Fr
IB	21	Robin Miller	RFr
FB	15	Willie Miller	Sr
TE	45	John Murphy	Sr
OT	63	Brian Nelson	RFr
WB	12	Bobby Newcombe	Sr
WB	24	Jack O'Holleran	Fr
SE	23	Ryan Ommert	RFr
WB	83	Matt Plooster	RFr
OT	69	Nick Povendo	Fr
C	54	Dominic Raiola	Jr
IB	47	Tim Reese	RFr
G	66	Jon Rutherford	Jr
G	79	Chris Saalfeld	Sr
OT	65	Jason Schwab	GS
TE	85	Chris Septak	Fr
C	53	Matt Shook	So
G	56	Dan Swantek	So
SE	9	Wilson Thomas	So
SE	31	Fred Thorne	RFr
FB	48	Curtis Tomasevicz	Fr
OT	68	Dan Vili Waldrop	RFr
OT	57	Cody Volk	RFr
OT	58	Dave Volk	Jr
SE	91	Kiffin Wigert	Fr
FB	25	Andy Wingender	Fr
TE	87	Tracey Wistrom	Jr
WB	2	Ben Zajicek	Fr

Defense

Pos.	#	Name	Class
RE	98	Demoine Adams	So
ROV	27	Willie Amos	Fr
RCB	28	Josh Anderson	Sr
SLB	41	Rod Baker	Sr
NT	59	Ryon Bingham	RFr
ROV	22	Rob Blomeier	RFr
ROV	29	Mic Boettner	Jr
FS	14	Dion Booker	Jr
RE		Manaia Brown	Fr
SLB	49	Brad Bryan	RFr
WLB	39	Chad Buller	Fr
FS	43	Dan Burrow	Fr
MLB	48	Jamie Burrow	Jr
LCB	4	Terrell Butler	Fr
NT	55	Jon Clanton	So
MLB		Shaun Coleman	Fr
SLB	27	Ira Cooper	Fr
MLB	35	Jon Coyne	Jr
LCB	3	Keyuo Craver	Jr
ROV	32	Tim Demerath	Jr
ROV	2	Mike Demps	So
RE	46	Ty Dilts	So
RE	88	Chris Estudillo	RFr
FS	19	Clint Finley	Sr
FS	38	Eric Fischer	Sr
SLB	53	Gabe Fries	So
ROV	1	Taylor Gehman	So
RCB	5	DeJuan Groce	So
RE	97	Matt Grummert	Sr
LCB	26	Kevin Guse	RFr
LCB	18	Jeff Hemje	Jr
SLB	51	Anthony Hoke	RFr
SLB	40	T.J. Hollowell	Fr
WLB	40	Lannie Hopkins	Fr
RCB	24	Matt Ickes	Jr
LCB	36	Joel Jackson	Fr
WLB	23	Blanchard Johnson	RFr
DT	94	Patrick Kabongo	RFr
DT	91	Loran Kaiser	Sr
RE	57	Chris Kelsay	So
NT	70	Jason Lohr	Jr
MLB	44	Jason Long	Fr
MLB	54	Mike Makris	RFr
DT	79	Stephen Manning	So
RE	76	Jeff McBride	Fr
LCB	33	Dwayne McClary	Sr
DT	71	Matt McGinn	Jr
RCB	6	Lornell McPherson	Fr
WLB	58	Tim Miller	RFr
RE	93	Brandon Mooberry	Sr
RCB	21	Don Neal	RFr
NT	85	Casey Nelson	Jr
CB	25	Jamie Otto	Fr
RE	78	Phil Peetz	RFr
SLB	44	Jon Penny	Jr
FS	31	Jerrell Pippens	RFr
MLB	13	Carlos Polk	Sr
WLB	47	Jason Richenberger	Fr
RCB	28	Pat Ricketts	RFr
RE	86	Kyle Ringenberg	So
MLB	50	Steve Safranek	RFr
ROV	15	Ronjiel Sharpe	RFr
DT	45	Trevor Schade	Fr
FS	11	Carl Scholting	RFr
SLB	43	Scott Shanle	So
DT	56	Jeremy Slechta	Jr
WLB	45	Jemond Smith	So
RE	92	Justin Smith	So
MLB		Luke Smith	So
WLB	34	Randy Stella	So
RCB	16	Erwin Swiney	Jr
NT	96	Junior Tagoa'i	RFr
MLB	90	Tony Tata	So
ROV	8	Aaron Terpening	So
RE	52	Benard Thomas	Fr
RE	83	Kyle Vanden Bosch	Sr
WLB	9	Mark Vedral	Jr
ROV	25	Joe Walker	Sr
CB	7	Treoun Walker	Fr
NT	65	Brian Wanish	Sr
RE	99	Adrian Warrior	So
FS	42	Troy Watchorn	Sr
LCB	37	Jay White	So
RE	95	J.P. (John Paul) Wichmann	Jr
ROV	20	Wes Woodward	Jr

Special teams

Pos.	#	Name	Class
PK	26	Josh Brown	So
PK	22	Sandro DeAngelis	Fr
P	17	Dan Hadenfeldt	Sr
P	18	Kyle Larson	Fr
PK	10	Chace Long	Sr

Head coach

- Frank Solich
  3rd season
  22nd year at Nebraska
  Alma mater: Nebraska

Coordinators/assistant coaches

- Craig Bohl
  1st season as DC/LB coach
  9th year at Nebraska
  Alma mater: Nebraska
- Turner Gill
  9th season as QB coach
  9th year at Nebraska
  Alma mater: Nebraska
- Ron Brown
  14th season as WR/TE coach
  14th year at Nebraska
  Alma mater: Brown
- Jeff Jamrog
  1st season as DL coach
  3rd year at Nebraska
  Alma mater: Nebraska
- Dan Young
  18th season as OL/K coach
  18th year at Nebraska
  Alma mater: Reed
- Milt Tenopir
  27th season as OL coach
  27th year at Nebraska
  Alma mater: Sterling
- Nelson Barnes
  4th season as RE coach
  4th year at Nebraska
  Alma mater: North Texas
- George Darlington
  DB coach
  28th year at Nebraska
  Alma mater: Rutgers
- Dave Gillespie
  3rd season as RB coach
  12th year at Nebraska
  Alma mater: Nebraska-Omaha
- Boyd Epley
  32nd season as S&C coach
  32nd year at Nebraska
  Alma mater: Nebraska

Legend

- (C) Team captain
- (S) Suspended
- (I) Ineligible
- Injured
- Redshirt

Roster

=== Depth chart ===
Defense

FS
Dion Booker
Troy Watchorn
Willie Amos

WILL	MIKE	SAM
Randy Stella	Carlos Polk	Scott Shanle
Mark Vedral	Jamie Burrow	T.J. Hollowell
Jon Penny	Tony Tata	Rod Baker

ROVER
Joe Walker
Clint Finley
Wes Woodward

CB
Keyuo Craver
Pat Ricketts
Dwayne McClary

DE	DT	DT	DE
Kyle Vanden Bosch	Jason Lohr	Loran Kaiser	Chris Kelsay
J.P. Wichmann	Jon Clanton	Jeremy Slechta	Demoine Adams
Kyle Ringenberg	Junior Tagoa'i.	Casey Nelson	Justin Smith

CB
DeJuan Groce
Erwin Swiney
Jeff Hemje

Offense

WR
Matt Davison
Wilson Thomas
Tom Beveridge

LT	LG	C	RG	RT
Dave Volk	Toniu Fonoti	Dominic Raiola	Russ Hochstein	Jason Schwab
Chris Loos	Dan V Waldrop	Jon Rutherford	Jon Dawson	Kyle Kollmorgen
Scott Koethe	Wes Cody	Matt Shook	John Garrison	Nate Kolterman

TE
Tracey Wistrom
Aaron Golliday
Jon Bowling
Trevor Johnson

WR
Bobby Newcombe
John Gibson
Troy Hassebroek

QB
Eric Crouch
Jammal Lord
Joe Chrisman

RB
Dan Alexander
Correll Buckhalter
Dahrran Diedrick
Thunder Collins

FB
Willie Miller
Judd Davies
Paul Kastl

Special teams
PK Josh Brown
P Dan Hadenfeldt
KR Joe Walker
PR Bobby Newcombe

== Awards ==
Award	Name(s)
Rimington Trophy	Dominic Raiola
Draddy Trophy	Kyle Vanden Bosch
Sports Illustrated All-Bowl Team	Russ Hochstein
All-American 1st Team	Dominic Raiola, Carlos Polk, Russ Hochstein
All-American 2nd Team	Eric Crouch, Tracey Wistrom
All-Big 12 1st team	Dan Alexander, Keyuo Craver, Toniu Fonoti, Dan Hadenfeldt, Russ Hochstein, Carlos Polk, Dominic Raiola, Kyle Vanden Bosch, Tracey Wistrom
All-Big 12 2nd team	Eric Crouch
All-Big 12 3rd team	Troy Watchorn
All-Big 12 Honorable Mention	Correll Buckhalter, Matt Davison, Bobby Newcombe, Dave Volk

== NFL and pro players ==
The following Nebraska players who participated in the 2000 season later moved on to the next level and joined a professional or semi-pro team as draftees or free agents.

Name	Team
Demoine Adams	Edmonton Eskimos
Dan Alexander	Tennessee Titans
Ryon Bingham	San Diego Chargers
Josh Brown	Seattle Seahawks
Correll Buckhalter	Philadelphia Eagles
Eric Crouch	St. Louis Rams
Keyuo Craver	New Orleans Saints
Josh Davis	New York Jets
Clint Finley	Kansas City Chiefs
Toniu Fonoti	San Diego Chargers
Aaron Golliday	Scottish Claymores
DeJuan Groce	St. Louis Rams
Russ Hochstein	Tampa Bay Buccaneers
T. J. Hollowell	New York Giants
Trevor Johnson	New York Jets
Patrick Kabongo	Detroit Lions
Chris Kelsay	Buffalo Bills
Kyle Larson	Cincinnati Bengals
Jammal Lord	Houston Texans
Bobby Newcombe	Montreal Alouettes
Jerrell Pippens	Chicago Bears
Carlos Polk	San Diego Chargers
Dominic Raiola	Detroit Lions
Scott Shanle	St. Louis Rams
Jeremy Slechta	Philadelphia Eagles
Erwin Swiney	Green Bay Packers
Kyle Vanden Bosch	Arizona Cardinals
Joe Walker	Tennessee Titans
