= 2001 Nebraska Cornhuskers football team =

American college football season

2001 Nebraska Cornhuskers football

Big 12 North co-champion

Rose Bowl (BCS NCG), L 14–37 vs. Miami (FL)
- Conference: Big 12 Conference
- North Division

Ranking
- Coaches: No. 7
- AP: No. 8
- Record: 11–2 (7–1 Big 12)
- Head coach: Frank Solich (4th season)
- Offensive scheme: I formation
- Defensive coordinator: Craig Bohl (2nd season)
- Base defense: 4–3
- Home stadium: Memorial Stadium

2001 Big 12 Conference football standings
	Conf.			Overall
Team	W		L	W		L
North Division
No. 9 Colorado xy$	7	–	1	10	–	3
No. 8 Nebraska x%	7	–	1	11	–	2
Iowa State	4	–	4	7	–	5
Kansas State	3	–	5	6	–	6
Missouri	3	–	5	4	–	7
Kansas	1	–	7	3	–	8
South Division
No. 5 Texas xy	7	–	1	11	–	2
No. 6 Oklahoma	6	–	2	11	–	2
Texas Tech	4	–	4	7	–	5
Texas A&M	4	–	4	8	–	4
Oklahoma State	2	–	6	4	–	7
Baylor	0	–	8	3	–	8
Championship: Colorado 39, Texas 37
$ – BCS representative as conference champion; % – BCS at-large representative; x – Division champion/co-champions; y – Championship game participant; Rankings from AP Poll

The 2001 Nebraska Cornhuskers football team represented the University of Nebraska–Lincoln in the 2001 NCAA Division I-A football season. The team was coached by Frank Solich and played their home games in Memorial Stadium in Lincoln, Nebraska. Notably, quarterback Eric Crouch won the Heisman Trophy that season, which culminanted in a national championship appearance.

== Schedule ==
Date	Time	Opponent	Rank	Site	TV	Result	Attendance
August 25	2:30 pm	TCU*	No. 4	Memorial Stadium; Lincoln, NE (Pigskin Classic)	ABC	W 21–7	77,473
September 1	11:30 am	Troy State*	No. 4	Memorial Stadium; Lincoln, NE	FSN	W 42–14	77,812
September 8	7:00 pm	No. 17 Notre Dame*	No. 5	Memorial Stadium; Lincoln, NE (rivalry, College GameDay)	ABC	W 27–10	78,118
September 20	7:30 pm	Rice*	No. 4	Memorial Stadium; Lincoln, NE		W 48–3	77,344
September 29	11:30 am	at Missouri	No. 4	Faurot Field; Columbia, MO (rivalry)	FSN	W 36–3	64,204
October 6	6:00 pm	Iowa State	No. 4	Memorial Stadium; Lincoln, NE (rivalry)	FSN	W 48–14	78,002
October 13	1:00 pm	at Baylor	No. 4	Floyd Casey Stadium; Waco, TX		W 48–7	38,102
October 20	6:00 pm	Texas Tech^{†}	No. 3	Memorial Stadium; Lincoln, NE	FSN	W 41–31	77,838
October 27	11:00 am	No. 2 Oklahoma	No. 3	Memorial Stadium; Lincoln, NE (rivalry, College GameDay)	ABC	W 20–10	78,031
November 3	6:00 pm	at Kansas	No. 2	Memorial Stadium; Lawrence, KS (rivalry)	FSN	W 51–7	50,750
November 10	2:30 pm	Kansas State	No. 2	Memorial Stadium; Lincoln, NE (rivalry)	ABC	W 31–21	77,818
November 23	2:30 pm	at No. 14 Colorado	No. 2	Folsom Field; Boulder, CO (rivalry)	ABC	L 36–62	53,790
January 3, 2002	7:00 pm	vs. No. 1 Miami (FL)*	No. 4	Rose Bowl; Pasadena, CA (Rose Bowl, rivalry, College Gameday)	ABC	L 14–37	93,781
*Non-conference game; ^{†}Homecoming; Rankings from AP Poll released prior to the game; All times are in Central time

== Roster and coaching staff ==
2001 Nebraska Cornhuskers football team roster
Players
Coaches
Offense

Pos.	#	Name	Class
IB	41	Matt Albertson	Jr
G	64	Steve Altstadt	Sr
G	71	Jake Andersen	RFr
SE	38	Brandon Biodrowski	Fr
TE	84	Jon Bowling	Jr
SE	85	Clifford Brye	Jr
QB	11	Joe Chrisman	Jr
G	59	Wes Cody	Jr
IB	1	Thunder Collins	Jr
SE	32	Kelly Cook	So
WB	81	Ben Cornelsen	Jr
QB	7	Eric Crouch	Sr
TE	80	Will Dabbert	Jr
FB	4	Judd Davies	So
IB	25	Josh Davis	So
G	50	Jon Dawson	So
IB	30	Dahrran Diedrick	Jr
WB	29	Andrew Dunn	RFr
G	78	Mike Erickson	RFr
OT	65	M.J. Flaum	RFr
G	77	Toniu Fonoti	Jr
C	52	John Garrison	Jr
QB	2	Chris Giacone	RFr
WB	8	John Gibson	GS
FB	39	Zach Giesselmann	Fr
TE	99	Aaron Golliday	Jr
FB	49	Nick Gragert	Sr
OT	72	Tim Green	So
IB	6	DeAntae Grixby	So
SE	89	Troy Hassebroek	Jr
C	51	Richie Incognito	Fr
SE	88	Jason Jisa	RFr
FB	37	Paul Kastl	Jr
TE	47	Dusty Keiser	RFr
SE	19	John Klem	Jr
FB	40	Kniep Phillip	Fr
OT	73	Scott Koethe	Jr
OT	75	Kyle Kollmorgen	Sr
C	74	David Kolowski	Jr
OT	67	Nate Kolterman	Jr
FB	45	Steve Kriewald	RFr
SE	13	Tim Liley	So
C	63	Jack Limbaugh	So
QB	15	Brett Lindstrom	So
WB	12	DeWayne Long	RFr
OT	62	Cameron Loos	Fr
OT	76	Chris Loos	So
QB	10	Jammal Lord	So
OL	56	Nate Manley	Fr
SE	28	Luke McGowan	So
QB	18	Mike McLaughlin	So
SE	14	Ryan Mikluscak	RFr
IB	21	Robin Miller	So
IB	5	Nanfwang Mutfwang	Fr
G	61	Brian Nelson	So
WB	24	Jack O'Holleran	RFr
SE	23	Ryan Ommert	So
TE	82	Phil Peetz	So
OT	54	Gary Pike	Fr
WB	27	Matt Plooster	So
OT	69	Nick Povendo	RFr
IB	36	Tim Reese	So
TE	86	Kyle Ringenberg	Jr
IB	2	Cory Ross	Fr
G	66	Jon Rutherford	Sr
SE	81	Matt Schroeder	Fr
TE	83	Chris Septak	RFr
G	79	Josh Sewell	So
TE	42	Alex Shada	RFr
C	53	Matt Shook	Jr
QB	17	Scott Siefken	RFr
IB	33	Marques Simmons	Fr
QB	16	Mike Stuntz	Fr
G	55	Junior Tagoa'i	So
SE	9	Wilson Thomas	Jr
WB	31	Fred Thorne	So
FB	35	Curt Tomasevicz	RFr
OT	68	Dan Vili Waldrop	So
OT	57	Cody Volk	So
OT	58	Dave Volk	Sr
FB	43	Tim Welrmer	Fr
SE	20	Kiffin Wigert	RFr
FB	34	Andy Wingender	So
TE	87	Tracey Wistrom	Sr
TE	44	Matthew Woodward	Fr
WB	5	Ben Zajicek	RFr

Defense

Pos.	#	Name	Class
RE	98	Demoine Adams	Jr
NT	72	Titus Adams	Fr
FS	27	Willie Amos	So
DT	59	Ryon Bingham	So
ROV	21	Philip Bland	Fr
ROV	29	Mic Boettner	Sr
FS	14	Dion Booker	Sr
NT	91	Manaia Brown	RFr
WLB	39	Chad Buller	So
FS	6	Daniel Bullocks	Fr
ROV	22	Josh Bullocks	Fr
CB	7	Rodney Burgess	Jr
FS	36	Dan Burrow	RFr
MLB	48	Jamie Burrow	Sr
ROV	4	Terrell Butler	So
NT	55	Jon Clanton	Jr
MLB	47	Ira Cooper	RFr
LCB	3	Keyuo Craver	Sr
ROV	32	Tim Demerath	Sr
NT	62	Seppo Evwaraye	Fr
LB	41	Jared Franzluebbers	Fr
SLB	51	Gabe Fries	Jr
RCB	5	DeJuan Groce	Jr
LCB	26	Kevin Guse	So
NT	74	Jared Helming	Fr
RCB	18	Jeff Hemje	Sr
WLB	46	Anthony Hoke	So
MLB	17	T.J. Hollowell	So
ROV	40	Lannie Hopkins	RFr
RCB	15	Kellen Huston	RFr
LB	34	Adam Ickes	Fr
RCB	24	Matt Ickes	Sr
LCB	30	Joel Jackson	RFr
WLB	23	Blanchard Johnson	So
RE	88	Trevor Johnson	So
DT	94	Patrick Kabongo	So
RE	57	Chris Kelsay	Jr
CB	8	Randy Landingham	Fr
NT	70	Jason Lohr	Sr
MLB	53	Mike Makris	So
CB		Danieal Manning	Fr
DT	79	Stephen Manning	Jr
RE	76	Jeff McBride	RFr
LCB	1	Lornell McPherson	RFr
WLB	58	Tim Miller	So
DT	85	Casey Nelson	Sr
DT	63	Matt O'Shea	Fr
LCB	13	Jamie Otto	RFr
FS	31	Jerrell Pippens	So
LCB	1	Seth Rexilius	Fr
WLB	44	Jason Richenberger	RFr
LCB	28	Pat Ricketts	So
MLB	38	Barrett Ruud	Fr
MLB	47	Steve Safranek	So
FS	35	Carl Scholting	So
SLB	43	Scott Shanle	Jr
RE	96	Matt Shrader	Fr
FS	23	Shane Siegel	Fr
LB	52	Chad Sievers	So
DT	56	Jeremy Slechta	Sr
SLB	45	Jemond Smith	Jr
RE	92	Justin Smith	Jr
DT	66	Le Kevin Smith	Fr
RCB	16	Erwin Swiney	Sr
MLB	90	Tony Tata	Jr
ROV	2	Aaron Terpening	Jr
RE	10	Benard Thomas	So
CB	25	Blake Tiedtke	Fr
RE	93	Tyler Toline	RFr
WLB	9	Mark Vedral	Sr
RE	97	Adrian Warrior	Jr
LCB	12	Jay White	Jr
LCB	33	Seth White	So
RE	95	J.P. (John Paul) Wichmann	Sr
ROV	20	Wes Woodward	Sr

Special teams

Pos.	#	Name	Class
PK	26	Josh Brown	Jr
PK	90	Stephen Colon	Fr
PK	22	Sandro DeAngelis	RFr
P	19	Kyle Larson	So
PK	92	Zach Wright	Fr
PK	93	Dustin Zambondi	Fr

Head coach

- Frank Solich
  4th season
  23rd year at Nebraska
  Alma mater: Nebraska

Coordinators/assistant coaches

- Craig Bohl
  2nd season as DC/LB coach
  10th year at Nebraska
  Alma mater: Nebraska
- Turner Gill
  10th season as QB coach
  10th year at Nebraska
  Alma mater: Nebraska
- Ron Brown
  15th season as WR/TE coach
  15th year at Nebraska
  Alma mater: Brown
- Jeff Jamrog
  2nd season as DL coach
  4th year at Nebraska
  Alma mater: Nebraska
- Dan Young
  19th season as OL/K coach
  19th year at Nebraska
  Alma mater: Reed
- Milt Tenopir
  28th season as OL coach
  28th year at Nebraska
  Alma mater: Sterling
- Nelson Barnes
  5th season as RE coach
  5th year at Nebraska
  Alma mater: North Texas
- George Darlington
  DB coach
  29th year at Nebraska
  Alma mater: Rutgers
- Dave Gillespie
  4th season as RB coach
  13th year at Nebraska
  Alma mater: Nebraska-Omaha
- Boyd Epley
  33rd season as S&C coach
  33rd year at Nebraska
  Alma mater: Nebraska

Legend

- (C) Team captain
- (S) Suspended
- (I) Ineligible
- Injured
- Redshirt

Roster
Last update: January 16, 2011

=== Depth chart ===
Defense

FS
Dion Booker
Willie Amos
Jerrell Pippens

WILL	MIKE	SAM
Mark Vedral	Jamie Burrow	Scott Shanle
T.J. Hollowell	Barrett Ruud	Ira Cooper
Blanchard Johnson	Jason Richenberger	Gabe Fries

ROVER
Philip Bland
Aaron Terpening
Tim Demerath
Terrell Butler

CB
Keyuo Craver
Pat Ricketts
Lornell McPherson

DE	DT	DT	DE
Demoine Adams	Jon Clanton	Jeremy Slechta	Chris Kelsay
J.P. Wichmann	Ryon Bingham	Casey Nelson	Justin Smith
Trevor Johnson	Manaia Brown	Patrick Kabongo	Benard Thomas

CB
DeJuan Groce
Erwin Swiney
Jeff Hemje

Offense

WR
Wilson Thomas
Ben Cornelson
Mike Stuntz

LT	LG	C	RG	RT
Dave Volk	Toniu Fonoti	John Garrison	Jon Rutherford	Dan Vil Waldrop
Scott Koethe	Steve Altstadt	David Kolowski	Wes Cody	Chris Loos
Kyle Kollmorgen	Mike Erickson	Matt Shook	Junior Tagoa'i	Nate Kolterman

TE
Tracey Wistrom
Aaron Golliday
Jon Bowling
Kyle Ringenberg

WR
John Gibson
Troy Hassebroek
John Klem

QB
Eric Crouch
Jammal Lord
Joe Chrisman

RB
Dahrran Diedrick
Thunder Collins
DeAntae Grixby

FB
Judd Davies
Steve Kriewald
Paul Kastl

Special teams
PK Josh Brown
P Kyle Larson
KR Josh Davis
PR DeJuan Groce

== Game summaries ==
=== TCU ===
TCU at Nebraska [box score]

Team	1	2	3	4	Total
TCU	7	0	0	0	7
• Nebraska	13	0	8	0	21

- Date: August 25
- Location: Memorial Stadium, Lincoln, Nebraska
- Game attendance: 77,473
- TV announcers (ABC): Mike Tirico (Play–by–play), Tim Brant (Color), & Todd Harris (Sideline)

=== Troy State ===
Troy State at Nebraska [box score]

Team	1	2	3	4	Total
Troy State	7	7	0	0	14
• Nebraska	14	14	7	7	42

- Date: September 1
- Location: Memorial Stadium, Lincoln, Nebraska
- Game attendance: 77,812
- TV announcers (FSN): Drew Goodman (Play–by–play), Dave Lapham (Color), & Jim Knox (Sideline)

=== Notre Dame ===
Notre Dame at Nebraska [box score]

Team	1	2	3	4	Total
Notre Dame	0	3	0	7	10
• Nebraska	17	10	0	0	27

- Date: September 8
- Location: Memorial Stadium, Lincoln, Nebraska
- Game attendance: 78,118
- TV announcers (ABC): Brent Musburger (Play–by–play), Gary Danielson (Color), & Jack Arute (Sideline)

=== Rice ===
Rice at Nebraska [box score]

Team	1	2	3	4	Total
Rice	0	0	0	3	3
• Nebraska	21	7	20	0	48

- Date: September 20
- Location: Memorial Stadium, Lincoln, Nebraska
- Game attendance: 77,344
- TV announcers (FSN): Joel Meyers (Play–by–play), James Lofton (Color), & Eric Clemons (Sideline)

Rice at Nebraska, on September 20, 2001 was the first NCAA College Football game following the infamous Terrorist Attacks of September 11, 2001.

=== Missouri ===
Nebraska at Missouri [box score]

Team	1	2	3	4	Total
• Nebraska	0	13	9	14	36
Missouri	3	0	0	0	3

- Date: September 29
- Location: Faurot Field, Columbia, Missouri
- Game attendance: 64,204
- TV announcers (FSN): Drew Goodman (Play–by–play), Dave Lapham (Color), & Jim Knox (Sideline)

=== Iowa State ===
Iowa State at Nebraska [box score]

Team	1	2	3	4	Total
Iowa State	0	0	14	0	14
• Nebraska	20	21	0	7	48

- Date: October 6
- Location: Memorial Stadium, Lincoln, Nebraska
- Game attendance: 78,002
- TV announcers (FSN): Joel Meyers (Play–by–play), James Lofton (Color), & Eric Clemons (Sideline)

=== Baylor ===
Nebraska at Baylor [box score]

Team	1	2	3	4	Total
• Nebraska	7	7	7	27	48
Baylor	0	7	0	0	7

- Date: October 13
- Location: Floyd Casey Stadium, Waco, Texas
- Game attendance: 38,102

=== Texas Tech ===
Texas Tech at Nebraska [box score]

Team	1	2	3	4	Total
Texas Tech	13	15	3	0	31
• Nebraska	21	7	10	3	41

- Date: October 20
- Location: Memorial Stadium, Lincoln, Nebraska
- Game attendance: 77,838
- TV announcers (FSN): Joel Meyers (Play–by–play), James Lofton (Color), & Eric Clemons (Sideline)

=== Oklahoma ===
Oklahoma at Nebraska [box score]

Team	1	2	3	4	Total
Oklahoma	0	10	0	0	10
• Nebraska	0	10	3	7	20

- Date: October 27
- Location: Memorial Stadium, Lincoln, Nebraska
- Game attendance: 78,031
- TV announcers (ABC): Brent Musburger (Play–by–play), Gary Danielson (Color), & Jack Arute (Sideline)

=== Kansas ===
Nebraska at Kansas [box score]

Team	1	2	3	4	Total
• Nebraska	0	20	7	24	51
Kansas	0	0	0	7	7

- Date: November 3
- Location: Memorial Stadium, Lawrence, Kansas
- Game attendance: 50,750
- TV announcers (FSN): Joel Meyers (Play–by–play), James Lofton (Color), & Eric Clemons (Sideline)

=== Kansas State ===
Kansas State at Nebraska [box score]

Team	1	2	3	4	Total
Kansas State	0	14	0	7	21
• Nebraska	0	13	15	3	31

- Date: November 10
- Location: Memorial Stadium, Lincoln, Nebraska
- Game attendance: 77,818
- TV announcers (ABC): Brad Nessler (Play–by–play), Bob Griese (Color), & Lynn Swann (Sideline)

=== Colorado ===
Nebraska at Colorado [box score]

Team	1	2	3	4	Total
Nebraska	3	20	7	6	36
• Colorado	28	14	0	20	62

- Date: November 23
- Location: Folsom Field, Boulder, Colorado
- Game attendance: 53,790
- TV announcers (ABC): Brent Musburger (Play–by–play), Gary Danielson (Color), & Jack Arute (Sideline)

#14 ranked Colorado pulled off a huge upset over #2 ranked Nebraska.

=== Miami (FL) ===
Nebraska vs Miami (FL) [box score]

Team	1	2	3	4	Total
Nebraska	0	0	7	7	14
• Miami (FL)	7	27	0	3	37

- Date: January 3
- Location: Rose Bowl, Pasadena, California
- Game attendance: 93,781
- TV announcers (ABC): Keith Jackson (Play–by–play), Tim Brant (Color), Todd Harris, & Lynn Swann (Sidelines)

== Rankings ==
Ranking movements Legend: ██ Increase in ranking ██ Decrease in ranking
	Week																
Poll	Pre	1	2	3	4	5	6	7	8	9	10	11	12	13	14	15	Final
AP	4	4	5	4	4	4	4	3	3	2	2	2	2	6	5	4	8
Coaches	4	4	4	4	4	4	4	4	3	3	2	2	2	6	4	4	7
Harris	Not released						N/A	N/A	N/A	N/A	N/A	N/A	N/A	N/A	N/A	N/A	Not released
BCS	Not released								2	1	1	1	1	4	3	2	Not released

== After the season ==
Nebraska finished in a tie for 1st place in the Big 12 North Division and also tied for 1st conference-wide, with a final record of 11–2 (7–1).

The events which took place at the end of the season put a strain on the system of college rankings and polls. The Cornhuskers lost their final regular season game to Colorado 36–62, leaving both tied for 1st place in the Big 12 North Division. As Colorado won the head-to-head contest, Colorado then participated in the Big 12 Championship and defeated Texas 39–37. Despite Colorado's accomplishments, Nebraska's strength-of-schedule component in the Bowl Championship Series selection system resulted in the Cornhuskers being selected to play in the 2002 Rose Bowl for the BCS National Championship Game against Miami, despite the fact that Nebraska had not played in its own conference championship game and technically had not even won its own division.

Nebraska then fell to Miami 14–37 in the Rose Bowl, but the controversy of these events led to more modifications to the BCS formula, which followed a pattern of seasonal tweaks dating back nearly to when the BCS system was implemented.

Senior Cornhusker quarterback Eric Crouch was the 2001 recipient of the Walter Camp Award, the Davey O'Brien Award, and the Heisman Trophy. Coach Solich was also selected Big 12 Football Coach of the Year.

=== Awards ===
Award	Name(s)
Heisman Trophy	Eric Crouch
Walter Camp Award	Eric Crouch
Davey O'Brien Award	Eric Crouch
Sporting News Player of the Year	Eric Crouch
ABC/Chevrolet Player of the Year	Eric Crouch
Big 12 Coach of the Year	Frank Solich
All-American 1st Team	Toniu Fonoti, Keyuo Craver, Eric Crouch
All-American 2nd Team	Chris Kelsay
All-American 3rd Team	Tracey Wistrom
All-Big 12 1st team	Toniu Fonoti, Eric Crouch, Keyuo Craver, Dahrran Diedrick
All-Big 12 2nd team	Dave Volk, Chris Kelsay, Jamie Burrow
All-Big 12 3rd team	Tracey Wistrom, Jeremy Slechta, DeJuan Groce, Kyle Larson

=== NFL and pro players ===
The following Nebraska players who participated in the 2001 season later moved on to the next level and joined a professional or semi-pro team as draftees or free agents.

Name	Team
Demoine Adams	Edmonton Eskimos
Titus Adams	New York Jets
Ryon Bingham	San Diego Chargers
Josh Brown	Seattle Seahawks
Daniel Bullocks	Detroit Lions
Josh Bullocks	New Orleans Saints
Eric Crouch	St. Louis Rams
Keyuo Craver	New Orleans Saints
Josh Davis	New York Jets
Toniu Fonoti	San Diego Chargers
Aaron Golliday	Scottish Claymores
DeJuan Groce	St. Louis Rams
T. J. Hollowell	New York Giants
Richie Incognito	St. Louis Rams
Trevor Johnson	New York Jets
Patrick Kabongo	Detroit Lions
Chris Kelsay	Buffalo Bills
Kyle Larson	Cincinnati Bengals
Jammal Lord	Houston Texans
Jerrell Pippens	Chicago Bears
Cory Ross	Baltimore Ravens
Barrett Ruud	Tampa Bay Buccaneers
Scott Shanle	St. Louis Rams
Jeremy Slechta	Philadelphia Eagles
Le Kevin Smith	New England Patriots
Erwin Swiney	Green Bay Packers
