= Black 41 Flash Reverse =

Oklahoma vs. Nebraska, 2001 "Black 41 Flash Reverse"
Oklahoma Sooners	Nebraska Cornhuskers
(7–0)	(8–0)
10	20
Head coach: Bob Stoops	Head coach: Frank Solich
AP / Coaches / BCS; 2 / 2 / 1	AP / Coaches / BCS; 3 / 3 / 2
	1	2	3	4	Total
Oklahoma	0	10	0	0	10
Nebraska	0	10	3	7	20
- Date: October 27, 2001
- Season: 2001
- Stadium: Memorial Stadium
- Location: Lincoln, Nebraska
- Favorite: Nebraska by 4.5
- National anthem: Cornhusker Marching Band
- Referee: Steve Usechek
- Attendance: 78,031

United States TV coverage
- Network: ABC
- Announcers: Brent Musburger (play–by–play); Gary Danielson (color); Jack Arute (sideline)

The 2001 Oklahoma vs. Nebraska football game was the eightieth edition of the Nebraska–Oklahoma rivalry, held on October 27, 2001 at Memorial Stadium in Lincoln, Nebraska. It featured the teams ranked first and second by the BCS and is remembered for Black 41 Flash Reverse, a fourth-quarter reverse pass that became the signature play of quarterback Eric Crouch's Heisman Trophy-winning season.

== Background ==
The Nebraska–Oklahoma rivalry was among college football's most significant throughout the 1960s, 1970s, and 1980s. Nebraska dominated the decade following Barry Switzer's 1988 resignation, winning ten of eleven games in the series, a stretch that ended when OU hired Bob Stoops. Stoops led the Sooners to a national championship in 2000, including a win over No. 1 Nebraska in Norman.

Both teams were again among college football's elite in 2001, ranking in the top three of all major polls leading into their October 27 meeting in Lincoln. Fourth-year starting quarterback Eric Crouch had led Nebraska to an 8–0 start and was considered a frontrunner for the Heisman Trophy. Oklahoma had won twenty consecutive games but entered as a slight underdog. ESPN's College GameDay made its second visit to Lincoln of the season – Lee Corso selected Oklahoma, promising to ride a mechanical bull at a campus fraternity if Nebraska won.

== Game ==
A scoreless opening quarter gave way to a chaotic second quarter, which began with OU starter Jason White tearing his ACL while completing a long pass in Nebraska territory. Backup Nate Hybl played the rest of the game in relief of White, completing his first pass to tight end Trent Smith in the end zone to give OU a 7–0 lead. Nebraska had opened the game with six consecutive punts but responded quickly to the OU score, tying the game on a ten-play touchdown drive. NU added a field goal minutes later to take a 10–7 lead.

As the first half wound down, OU offensive coordinator Mark Mangino called a reverse pass to Hybl that strongly resembled the play Nebraska would successfully run two quarters later. With a clear path to the end zone, Hybl tripped and the pass fell incomplete, forcing OU to settle for a field goal to tie the game at ten before halftime.

Nebraska intercepted Hybl on the second play of the second half, and a long run by I-back Thunder Collins set up a field goal to take a 13–10 lead that stood into the fourth quarter. With nine minutes left in regulation, an Oklahoma pooch punt pinned the Cornhuskers at their own four yard-line. NU moved the ball to the 32-yard line before Crouch was stopped in the backfield on third-and-two, but a facemask penalty gave Nebraska a first down. NU head coach Frank Solich called Black 41 Flash Reverse, to the surprise of his offense.

=== Black 41 Flash Reverse ===
Nebraska practiced Black 41 Flash Reverse leading up to the game, but according to Crouch it had gone poorly and was removed from the playbook before Saturday. NU lined up in a formation it had used twice earlier, both resulting in an end-around to Collins. Oklahoma's safeties stepped forward to support against a run before Crouch again handed to Collins, who then pitched to split end Mike Stuntz, a true freshman who was a quarterback in high school but played sparingly at Nebraska. Crouch rolled left and sprinted downfield as Stuntz threw him the ball, making the catch at the Oklahoma 40 and running untouched into the end zone.

The teams traded punts, the tenth of the game for each team, and Nebraska ran out the clock on a 20–10 victory.

=== Scoring summary ===
Qtr	Time	Team	Detail	OU	NU
2	10:27	OU	Trent Smith 4-yd pass from Nate Hybl (Tim Duncan kick)	7	0
2	5:58	NU	Dahrran Diedrick 2-yd run (Josh Brown kick)	7	7
2	2:36	NU	Brown 27-yd field goal	7	10
2	0:15	OU	Duncan 20-yd field goal	10	10
3	11:31	NU	Brown 26-yd field goal	10	13
4	6:17	NU	Eric Crouch 63-yd pass from Mike Stuntz (Brown kick)	10	20

=== Team statistics ===
Statistic	Oklahoma	Nebraska
First downs	21	13
Rushes–yards	29–105	44–164
Comp.–att.–yards	22–50–234	11–19–165
Total offense	339	329
Turnovers	2	1
Punts–average	10–38.6	10–38.2
Penalties–yards	6–45	6–57
Time of possession	29:08	30:52

== Aftermath ==
Nebraska vaulted to No. 1 in the BCS rankings, while Oklahoma remained ahead of undefeated Miami (FL) for another week. The Sooners remained in contention for a second consecutive national title until a home loss to 3–7 Oklahoma State in late November. NU lost its regular season finale 62–36 to Colorado, but was controversially selected to face Miami in the 2002 BCS National Championship Game despite not appearing in its own conference title game. The Hurricanes won convincingly, prompting sweeping changes to the BCS selection process, including the elimination of margin-of-victory criteria and an increase in emphasis on human polling.

Black 41 Flash Reverse is remembered as one of the most significant plays in Nebraska football history and, despite an otherwise underwhelming performance against a stout OU defense, pushed Crouch to the front of the Heisman Trophy race. A month later, he became the first true option quarterback to win the award, edging out Florida's Rex Grossman and Miami's Ken Dorsey. He was drafted by the St. Louis Rams as a wide receiver in the third round of the 2002 NFL draft, but never played an NFL game.
