= Shawn Bouwens =

American football player (born 1968)

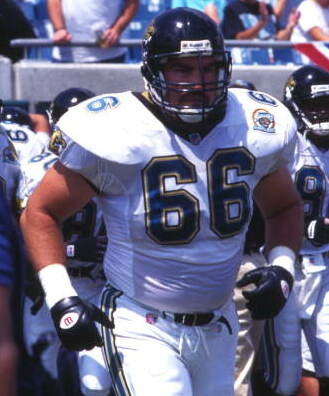
- Bouwens with the Jacksonville Jaguars in 1995

No. 66
- Position: Guard

Personal information
- Born: May 25, 1968 (age 58); Lincoln, Nebraska, U.S.
- Listed height: 6 ft 5 in (1.96 m)
- Listed weight: 293 lb (133 kg)

Career information
- High school: Northeast (Lincoln)
- College: Nebraska Wesleyan
- NFL draft: 1990: 9th round, 226th overall pick

Career history
- New England Patriots (1990)*; Cleveland Browns (1990)*; Detroit Lions (1991–1994); Jacksonville Jaguars (1995); Indianapolis Colts (1996)*
- * Offseason or practice squad member only

Career NFL statistics
- Games played: 73
- Games started: 42
- Fumble recoveries: 4
- Stats at Pro Football Reference

Shawn M. Bouwens (born May 25, 1968) is an American former professional football player who was a guard in the National Football League (NFL). He played college football for the Nebraska Wesleyan Prairie Wolves. He played in the NFL for the Detroit Lions and Jacksonville Jaguars.

== Biography ==
Bouwens was born in Lincoln, Nebraska and graduated from Lincoln Northeast High School. Bowens attended Nebraska Wesleyan University and was selected by the New England Patriots in the ninth round (226th overall) of the 1990 NFL draft.

Bouwens played in the National Football League for five seasons, playing for the Detroit Lions from 1991 to 1994 and the Jacksonville Jaguars in 1995.
