= DeJuan Groce =

American football player (born 1980)

No. 24, 28
- Position: Cornerback

Personal information
- Born: February 17, 1980 (age 46); Garfield Heights, Ohio, U.S.
- Listed height: 5 ft 10 in (1.78 m)
- Listed weight: 191 lb (87 kg)

Career information
- High school: St. Edward (Lakewood, Ohio)
- College: Nebraska
- NFL draft: 2003: 4th round, 107th overall pick

Career history
- St. Louis Rams (2003–2005); New Orleans Saints (2006); Seattle Seahawks (2007)*; Toronto Argonauts (2008)*
- * Offseason or practice squad member only

Awards and highlights
- First-team All-American (2002); Consensus All-Big 12 (2002)

Career NFL statistics
- Tackles: 125
- Interceptions: 3
- Passes defended: 17
- Stats at Pro Football Reference

DeJuan Anthony Groce (born February 17, 1980) is an American former professional football player who was a cornerback in the National Football League (NFL). He played college football for the Nebraska Cornhuskers. He earned first-team All-American honors in 2002, and set or tied four school records as well as an NCAA record. Groce was selected by the St. Louis Rams in the 2003 NFL draft. He was also a member of the New Orleans Saints, Seattle Seahawks, and Toronto Argonauts.

== Early life ==
DeJuan Groce was born on February 17, 1980, to Debra and Warren Groce. Growing up, he was very involved in a wide variety of sports including football, basketball, and track. Groce attended St. Edward High School in Lakewood, Ohio, and was a letterman in football and track athletics. In football, he was named to the PrepStar's Dream Team. In track, he ran a personal best of 10.7 seconds in the 100 meters and 21.9 seconds in the 200 meters.

== College career ==
Following high school, Groce chose to attend the University of Nebraska–Lincoln over Michigan State, Indiana, Ohio State and Syracuse, where he played football and was a member of Kappa Alpha Psi fraternity. As a freshman, Groce was redshirted. As a red shirt freshman, Groce played in every game as the backup left corner, taking over as the left corner when Keyou Craver moved to nickel back. Groce had at least one tackle in 12-of-13 games and had 24 tackles. As a red shirt sophomore, Groce broke Ralph Brown's school record for pass breakups in a season with 17. In 2001, as a redshirt junior, Groce had his most productive season, starting every game at cornerback as well as returning kickoffs and punts. Additionally, Groce was named a First-team AP All-American for his punt-return duties, finishing fourth nationally with 17.0 yards per punt return.

As a senior, Groce was selected as one of the three team captains. He continued his productive career by starting every game of his redshirt-senior season. Against Troy State, Groce set a school record and tied an NCAA record with two punt return touchdowns and a pair of first-quarter interceptions in a 31–16 win. Overall, Groce set or tied four school records and set one NCAA record. Additionally, Groce joined 1972 Heisman Trophy winner Johnny Rodgers as the only players in NU history to amass 1,000 career punt return yards. In December 2002, Groce received a Communications degree.

=== College statistics ===
Year	School	Conf	G	GS	Tackles					Interceptions			
Year	School	Conf	G	GS	Solo	Ast	Tot	Sacks	Sacks-Yards	Int	PD	FF	FR
1999	Nebraska	B12	12	0	13	12	25	0	0	0	2	1	0
2000	Nebraska	B12	11	2	25	7	32	0	0	1	17	1	1
2001	Nebraska	B12	12	12	22	13	35	0	0	3	14	0	0
2002	Nebraska	B12	14	14	38	23	61	0	0	4	8	1	0

== Professional career ==
=== Pre-draft ===
Pre-draft measurables
Height	Weight	40-yard dash	10-yard split	20-yard split	20-yard shuttle	Three-cone drill	Vertical jump	Broad jump	Bench press	Wonderlic
5 ft 9 5/8 in (1.77 m)	192 lb (87 kg)	4.49 s	1.58 s	2.62 s	4.00 s	6.82 s	36 in (0.91 m)	10 ft 9 in (3.28 m)	18 reps	14
All from NFL Combine.

=== St. Louis Rams ===
He was selected by the St. Louis Rams with the tenth pick of the fourth round of the 2003 NFL draft.

=== New Orleans Saints ===
The New Orleans Saints released Groce on June 15, 2007.

=== Seattle Seahawks ===
Groce signed with the Seattle Seahawks on August 14, 2007. He was released on September 1, 2007.

=== Toronto Argonauts ===
On May 31, 2008, Groce signed with the Toronto Argonauts of the Canadian Football League. However, Groce was released before the start of the regular season.
