= Jammal Lord =

American football player (born 1981)

No. 20
- Positions: Quarterback, safety

Personal information
- Born: January 10, 1981 (age 45); Brooklyn, New York, U.S.
- Listed height: 6 ft 2 in (1.88 m)
- Listed weight: 215 lb (98 kg)

Career information
- High school: Bayonne (Bayonne, New Jersey)
- College: Nebraska
- NFL draft: 2004: 6th round, 175th overall pick

Career history
- Houston Texans (2004–2005); Indianapolis Colts (2006)*; Abilene Ruff Riders (2007)
- * Offseason or practice squad member only

Career NFL statistics
- Games played: 1
- Stats at Pro Football Reference

Jammal Alberto Lord (born January 10, 1981) is an American former professional football player in the National Football League (NFL). He played college football as a quarterback that started for the Nebraska Cornhuskers. He was selected with the 10th pick of the sixth round of the 2004 NFL draft by the Houston Texans to play safety. He finished his pro football career playing at wide receiver and cornerback for the Indoor Football League (IFL)'s Abilene Ruff Riders in 2007.

== Early life ==
Lord was born in the Bed-Stuy section of Brooklyn and moved to Bayonne, New Jersey after his father was killed in Panama. He learned option-style football as a nine-year-old quarterback on the local Pop Warner team. He went on to high school where he was a first-team all state quarterback along with Chris Simms. Lord played high school football at Bayonne High School, where he was also a three-year starter on the basketball team.

== College career ==
Lord played quarterback at the University of Nebraska–Lincoln and ran the Huskers' option-style offense of the era. Jammal's athleticism allowed him to excel as a double-threat quarterback, although his passing ability was criticized. As a starting quarterback, he directed his Nebraska teams to 7–7 and 10–3 records during the 2002 and 2003 seasons respectively. At 6–2, 220-pounds with good speed (4.5 40 yard dash), Lord was bullish rushing and passing for 2,774 yards in 2002 and for 2,253 yards in 2003.

One of Lord's memorable moments as a Husker came when his career as a starting quarterback was under fire during his junior year. Having been demoted from the first-team offense during the week of practice leading up to the October 5, 2002 game with McNeese State, Lord took it on his own to pick up the slack for his struggling offense. After finding out he was still the team's starting quarterback not long before kickoff time, Lord made the most of it. He finished the game with 17 rushes for 218 yards including touchdown runs of 5, 57, and 56 yards and also went 12-of-18 passing the ball for 151 yards which set a new Husker school record for rushing yards by a quarterback and total yards (369). The total yards record is now held by Joe Ganz (528 against Kansas State in 2007) and the rushing record for a quarterback is now held by Taylor Martinez (241 against Kansas State in 2010).

=== Statistics ===
| Year | Team | Passing | | | | | | Rushing | | | |
| Year | Team | Cmp | Att | Cmp% | Yds | TD | Int | Att | Yds | Avg | TD |
|---|---|---|---|---|---|---|---|---|---|---|---|
| 1999 | Nebraska | Redshirt | | | | | | | | | |
| 2000 | Nebraska | 9 | 16 | 56.2 | 116 | 0 | 1 | 28 | 130 | 4.6 | 4 |
| 2001 | Nebraska | 5 | 8 | 62.5 | 65 | 0 | 1 | 22 | 83 | 3.8 | 2 |
| 2002 | Nebraska | 95 | 204 | 46.6 | 1,362 | 12 | 12 | 251 | 1,412 | 5.6 | 8 |
| 2003 | Nebraska | 85 | 176 | 48.3 | 1,305 | 6 | 8 | 215 | 948 | 4.4 | 10 |
| Total | | 194 | 404 | 48.0 | 2,783 | 18 | 22 | 516 | 2,573 | 5.0 | 24 |

=== Highlights ===
- 2003 Honorable-Mention All-Big 12 (Coaches)
- 2003 Nebraska Team Captain
- Fifth at Nebraska in Total Offense (5,421 yards)
- 2002 Honorable-Mention All-Big 12 (Coaches)
- NU Single-Game Record for Quarterback Rushing (234 yards vs. Texas, 2002)
- Nebraska Season Total Offense Record (2,774 yards in 2002)
- NU Single-Game Total Offense Record (369 yards vs. McNeese State, 2002)
- NU Season Record for Rushing Yards by a Quarterback (1,412 yards in 2002)
- 2003 Big 12 Commissioner's Fall Academic Honor Roll
- Second at Nebraska in Quarterback Career Rushing (2,573 yards from 2000 to 2003)

== Professional career ==
Lord played in the NFL for the Houston Texans for two seasons starting in 2004 as a backup safety. He only played in one game which was during his rookie year. After being waived on July 24, 2006, by the Texans, Lord found a connection with the Indianapolis Colts. However, he was unable to make the final cut that season as Lord was waived on August 28, 2006.

He finished his pro football career playing wide receiver and cornerback for the Indoor Football League's Abilene Ruff Riders in 2007.

== Personal life ==
Lord has coached football and basketball as well as served as a driver's education teacher at Bayonne High School. Lord has also worked in the oil fields of North Dakota. He currently works as a supervisor at UPS
