= Charlie McBride (American football coach) =

American football coach

Biographical details
- Born: 1940 (age 85–86); Chicago, Illinois, U.S.

Playing career
- 1959–1961: Colorado
- Positions: End, punter

Coaching career (HC unless noted)
- 1963–1964: Fenger Academy HS (IL)
- 1965–1966: Colorado (GA)
- 1967–1969: Arizona State (assistant)
- 1970–1975: Wisconsin (OL)
- 1976: Wisconsin (DC/DL)
- 1977–1981: Nebraska (assistant)
- 1982–1999: Nebraska (DC)

Charlie McBride is an American former football coach. He was an assistant football coach for Nebraska Cornhuskers football for 23 years from 1977 to 1999, and was the defensive coordinator for the final 18 years, from 1982 to 1999. He won national championships with Nebraska in 1994, 1995 and 1997. In 1996, he was a finalist for the Broyles Award. He announced his retirement from coaching after the 2000 Fiesta Bowl.

Prior to coaching at Nebraska, he was a coach for the Arizona State Sun Devils and Wisconsin Badgers. McBride played college football as an end and punter for the Colorado Buffaloes.
