= Lincoln Northeast High School =

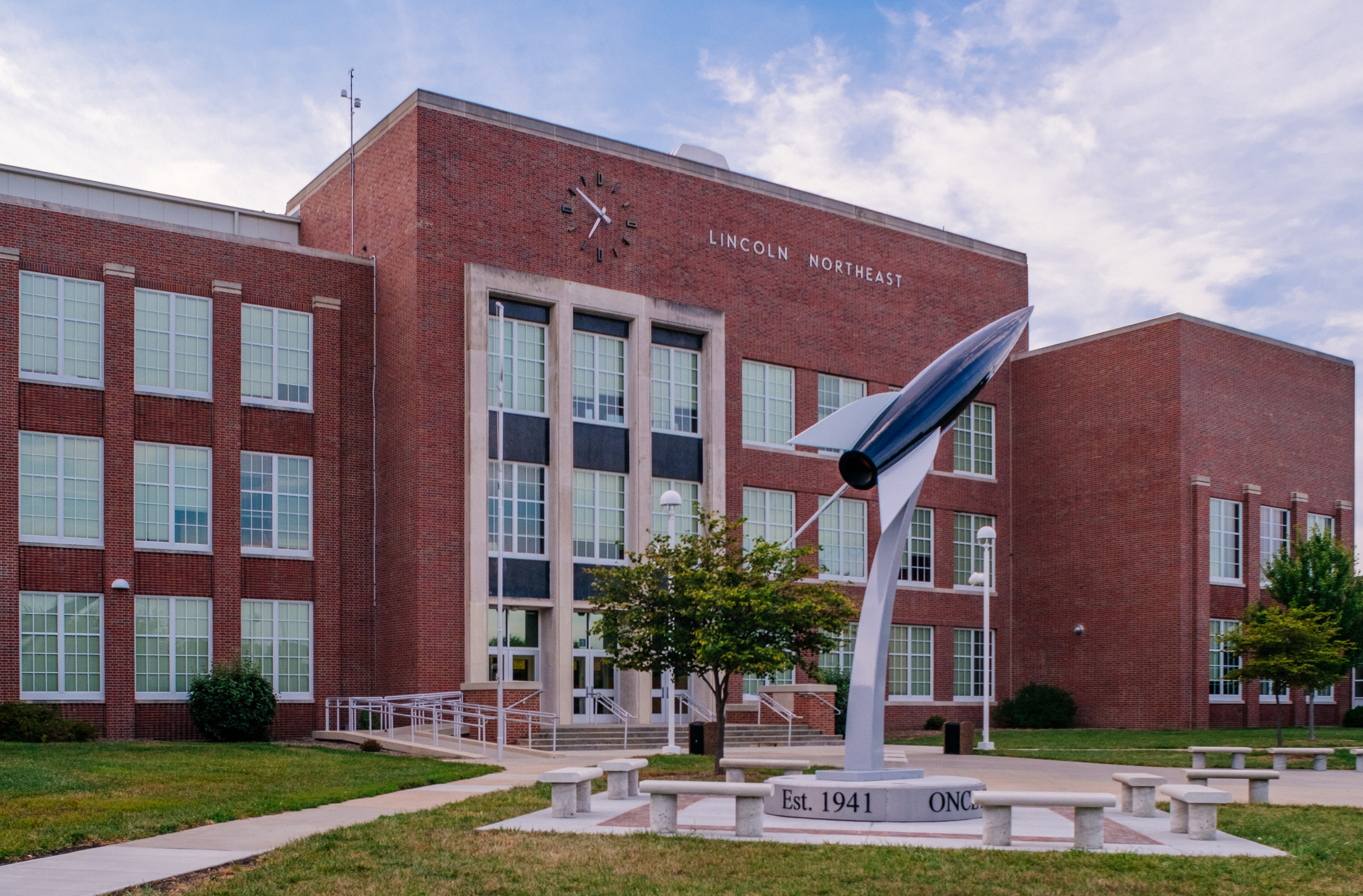

Location
- 2635 N 63rd Street; Lincoln, Nebraska 68507; United States; 40°50′22″N 96°38′08″W

Information
- Type: Public high school
- Established: 1941
- School district: Lincoln Public Schools
- NCES School ID: 317284001161
- Principal: Elizabeth Miller
- Teaching staff: 117.73 (on an FTE basis)
- Grades: 9–12
- Enrollment: 1,769 (2023-2024)
- Student to teacher ratio: 15.08
- Colors: Black and White
- Mascot: Rocket
- Nickname: Rockets
- Website: lne.lps.org

Lincoln Northeast High School is a public high school in Lincoln, Nebraska, United States. It is part of the Lincoln Public Schools district and was established in 1941 when three rival schools (Bethany, Havelock and Jackson) were combined into one. The school is accredited by the North Central Association of Colleges and Secondary Schools and has been rated "AA" by the Nebraska Department of Education since 1943.

== Mascot ==
The school's athletic teams are known as the Rockets. The name was originally taken from the Rock Island Rocket, a passenger train that once passed through northeast Lincoln. In the 1960s, a decommissioned Nike Ajax missile was donated to the school and placed on the front lawn. The missile was repeatedly stolen and recovered; in 1990, it disappeared permanently. In 2016, members of the booster club raised $55,000 for a new 16-foot (4.9 m), 10,000-pound (4,500 kg) rocket sculpture.

== Athletics ==
Lincoln Northeast teams have won state championships in the following years:

- Baseball - 1957
- Boys' basketball - 1949, 1950, 1962, 1967, 1968, 1970, 1973, 1982, 1995, 1996, 1997, 1998
- Girls' basketball - 2005
- Bowling - 2003, 2004, 2006
- Unified bowling - 2023
- Cross country - 1971
- Football - 1943, 1950, 1962, 1972 (tie)
- Gymnastics - 1957, 1958, 1962, 1963, 1965, 1966, 1967
- Boys' golf - 1965
- Volleyball - 1981, 1984, 1991, 1998.

== Notable alumni ==
- William L. Armstrong, U.S. Representative and Senator from Colorado
- Shawn Bouwens, professional football player for Detroit Lions and Jacksonville Jaguars
- Joba Chamberlain, professional baseball player, pitcher for Detroit Tigers and New York Yankees
- Gene V. Glass, statistician who coined term "meta-analysis"
- Trevor Johnson, professional football player for New York Jets
- Joseph Robert "Bob" Kerrey, Medal of Honor recipient; President of The New School in New York City; Governor of Nebraska; U.S. Senator from Nebraska; 1992 Democratic Presidential candidate
- Peggy Liddick, Australian women's national gymnastics coach
- Mike Lux, co-founder and president of Progressive Strategies, L.L.C.
- Danny Noonan, professional football player for Dallas Cowboys and Green Bay Packers
- Erwin Swiney, professional football player for Green Bay Packers.
