= 2000 Fiesta Bowl =

2000 Tostitos Fiesta Bowl
- BCS Bowl Game; 29th Fiesta Bowl
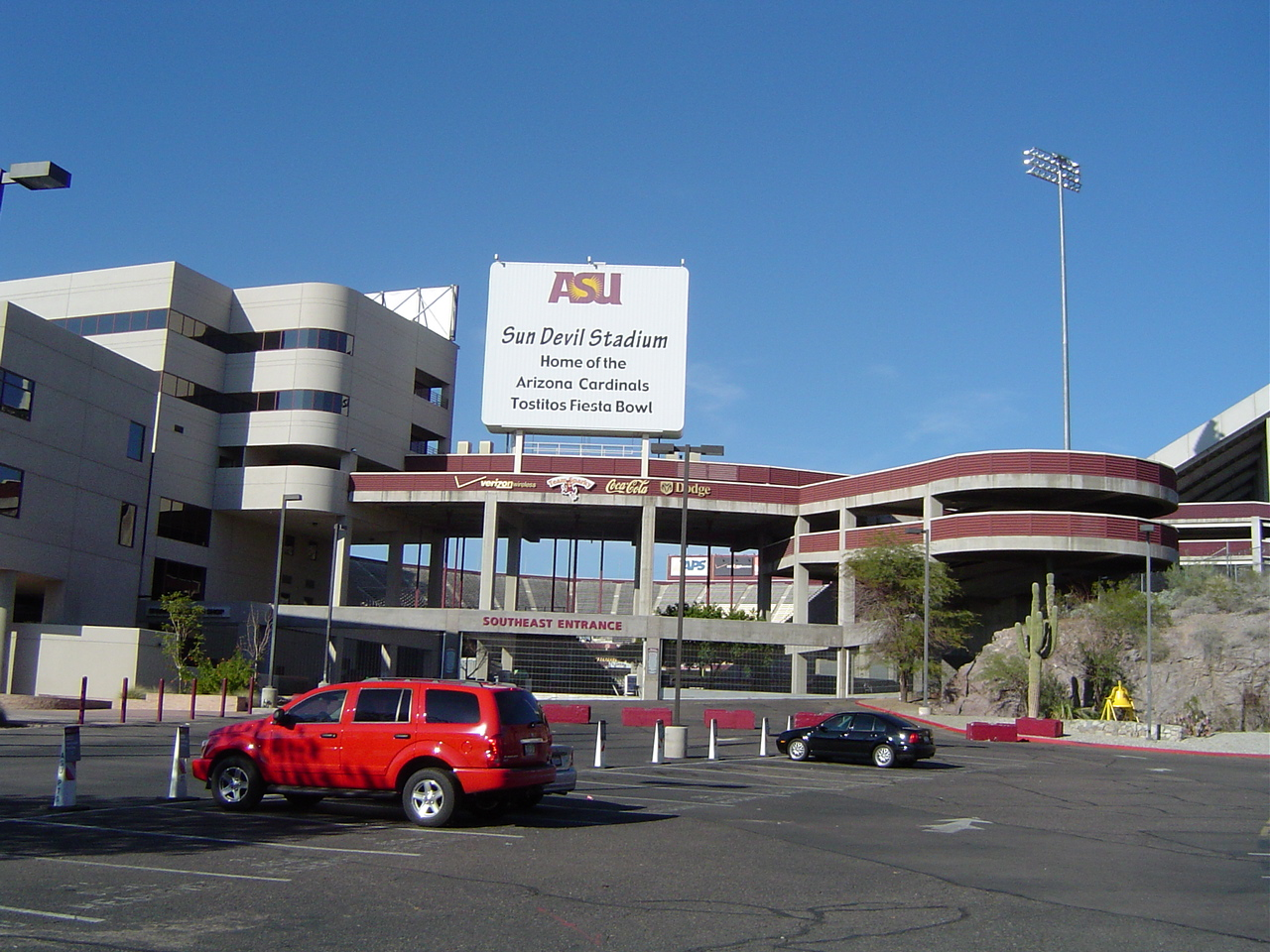
- Sun Devil Stadium in Tempe, Arizona, hosted the Fiesta Bowl.
Tennessee Volunteers	Nebraska Cornhuskers
(9–2)	(11–1)
SEC	Big 12
21	31
Head coach: Phillip Fulmer	Head coach: Frank Solich
AP / Coaches / BCS; 6 / 5 / 5	AP / Coaches / BCS; 3 / 3 / 3
	1	2	3	4	Total
Tennessee	0	7	7	7	21
Nebraska	14	3	7	7	31
- Date: January 2, 2000
- Season: 1999
- Stadium: Sun Devil Stadium
- Location: Tempe, Arizona
- Favorite: Nebraska by 3.5
- National anthem: Tunes Wrap
- Referee: Bill LeMonnier (Big Ten)
- Attendance: 71,526

United States TV coverage
- Network: ABC
- Announcers: Tim Brant, Dean Blevins, and Leslie Gudel

The 2000 Tostitos Fiesta Bowl, played on January 2, 2000, was the 29th edition of the Fiesta Bowl. The game was played at Sun Devil Stadium in Tempe, Arizona between the Tennessee Volunteers (ranked #5 in the BCS) and the Nebraska Cornhuskers (ranked #3 in the BCS). The matchup featured the two most current National Championship teams: Nebraska in 1997, and Tennessee in 1998. The teams first met two years earlier for the 1998 Orange Bowl.

== Scoring Summary ==
=== 1st Quarter ===
Nebraska – Dan Alexander 7 yard run (Josh Brown kick) 11:34 NEB 7 TN 0

Nebraska – Bobby Newcombe 60 yard punt return (Josh Brown kick) 3:21 NEB 14 TN 0

=== 2nd Quarter ===
Nebraska – Josh Brown 31-yard field goal 1:37 NEB 17 TN 0

Tennessee – Donté Stallworth 9 yard pass from Tee Martin (Alex Walls kick) 0:18 NEB 17 TN 7

=== 3rd Quarter ===
Tennessee – Travis Henry 4 yard run (Alex Walls kick) 13:03 NEB 17 TN 14

Nebraska – Aaron Golliday 13 yard pass from Eric Crouch (Josh Brown kick) 4:44 NEB 24 TN 14

=== 4th Quarter ===
Nebraska – Correll Buckhalter 2 yard run (Josh Brown kick) 12:01 NEB 31 TN 14

Tennessee – Donte Stallworth 44 yard pass from Cedrick Wilson (Alex Walls kick) 7:25 NEB 31 TN 21
