= Bobby Newcombe =

American gridiron football player and coach (born 1979)

No. 12
- Position: Quarterback/wide receiver

Personal information
- Born: August 8, 1979 (age 47); Sierra Leone

Career information
- High school: Highland (Albuquerque, New Mexico, U.S.)
- College: Nebraska
- NFL draft: 2001: 6th round, 166th overall pick

Career history

Playing
- Arizona Cardinals (2001)*; Indianapolis Colts (2001)*; Baltimore Ravens (2001)*; Montreal Alouettes (2002)
- * Offseason or practice squad member only

Coaching
- Mesa CC (WR/DB) (2010–2015); Basha (AZ) HS (WR) (2016–2017); Casteel (AZ) HS (2018–present)

Awards and highlights
- National champion (1997); Second-team All-Big 12 (1999)

Robert Wundu Sowa Newcombe (born August 8, 1979) is a former American football quarterback that started for the Nebraska Cornhuskers.

== College career ==
As a sophomore in 1998, Bobby Newcombe started at quarterback and led his team to a 9–4 record and a No. 19 ranking nationally in spite of suffering from a knee injury in the first game that would plague him all season long. During the season, Newcombe led Nebraska in passing yards with 712 and had 228 rushing yards while completing 50-of-79 passes and throwing just one interception. The 6–0, 195-pound native of Albuquerque, New Mexico also recorded eight rushing touchdowns and one passing touchdown, while his longest run from the line of scrimmage was 20 yards. Newcombe's longest pass play covered 49 yards to wide receiver Matt Davison against Texas A&M on October 10, 1998.

One of Newcombe's most memorable moments for individual game performances came on August 29, 1998, when he completed 9-of-10 passes for 168 yards including a 46-yard touchdown pass to tight end Sheldon Jackson in a 56–27 shootout victory over Louisiana Tech which was televised nationally.

Newcombe was replaced at quarterback by Eric Crouch the following year as Crouch would go on to win the Heisman Trophy in 2001. Newcombe would finish his career as a return man and wide receiver for the Cornhuskers. His four seasons at Nebraska had him totalling 45 receptions for 660 yards with three touchdowns. He also added 48 punt returns for 829 yards which included three touchdown returns. One of those three touchdown returns went for 94 yards against Missouri on September 30, 2000, which set a Huskers school record.

=== Statistics ===
Year	Team	Passing						Rushing				Receiving				Punt returns			
Year	Team	Cmp	Att	Cmp%	Yds	TD	Int	Att	Yds	Avg	TD	Red	Yds	Avg	TD	No.	Yds	Avg	TD
1997	Nebraska	1	1	100.0	15	0	0	16	156	9.8	1	7	173	24.7	1	12	244	20.3	1
1998	Nebraska	50	79	63.3	712	1	1	83	228	2.7	8	0	0	0.0	0	0	0	0.0	0
1999	Nebraska	11	19	57.9	246	2	1	37	87	2.4	3	19	238	12.5	1	16	294	18.4	1
2000	Nebraska	0	0	—	0	0	0	9	18	2.0	0	19	249	13.1	1	20	291	14.6	1
Total		63	99	63.6	973	3	2	155	490	3.2	12	45	660	14.7	3	48	829	17.3	3

== Professional career ==
Newcombe played football professionally in the Canadian Football League for the Montreal Alouettes for one season. He was drafted in the 6th round of the 2001 NFL draft by the Arizona Cardinals, but wound up playing wide receiver in Canada at the slot receiver's position in 2002.

== Personal life ==
Newcombe now resides in Chandler, Arizona, and works as the head coach at Casteel High School. In addition to his education at Nebraska, he has also earned several degrees from the University of Phoenix, including a Doctor of Management.
