= Eric Crouch =

American gridiron football player and television sports analyst (born 1978)

No. 23, 7, 9
- Positions: Quarterback, safety, wide receiver

Personal information
- Born: November 16, 1978 (age 47); Omaha, Nebraska, U.S.
- Listed height: 6 ft 0 in (1.83 m)
- Listed weight: 210 lb (95 kg)

Career information
- High school: Millard North (Omaha)
- College: Nebraska (1997–2001)
- NFL draft: 2002: 3rd round, 95th overall pick

Career history

Playing
- St. Louis Rams (2002); Green Bay Packers (2003–2004)*; Kansas City Chiefs (2005)*; → Hamburg Sea Devils (2005); Toronto Argonauts (2006–2007); Team Texas (2008)*; Omaha Nighthawks (2011)
- * Offseason or practice squad member only

Coaching
- Midland (2018–2021) Special teams coordinator & running backs coach

Awards and highlights
- National champion (1997); Heisman Trophy (2001); Nebraska Cornhuskers No. 7 retired

Career NFL Europe statistics
- Total tackles: 25
- Pass deflections: 2

Career CFL statistics
- Passing attempts: 13
- Passing completions: 6
- Completion percentage: 42.6%
- TD–INT: 0–1
- Passing yards: 127
- College Football Hall of Fame

Eric Eugene Crouch (born November 16, 1978) is an American former college football player who was a quarterback for the Nebraska Cornhuskers. He won the Heisman Trophy, Walter Camp Award, and Davey O'Brien Award in 2001. Running Nebraska's option offense that year, he completed 105 of 189 passes for 1,510 yards and seven touchdowns, while also rushing for 1,115 yards and 18 touchdowns. He played professionally as a safety in NFL Europe and as a quarterback in the Canadian Football League (CFL) and United Football League (UFL).

Crouch appeared on the cover of the video game NCAA College Football 2K3. He also is a TV sports analyst and recreational equipment vendor.

== Early life ==
Crouch attended Millard North High School in Omaha, Nebraska graduating in 1997. As a senior, Crouch ran for 1,277 yards and 15 touchdowns adding 543 passing yards and 5 touchdowns. Crouch was named Gatorade High School Player of the Year for the state of Nebraska. He finished his high school career with 5,134 yards of total offense.

Crouch also ran Track & Field focusing on the sprints. He placed 2nd and 4th in the State Championships in the 100 meter and 200 meter races, respectively. His 10.4 second 100 meter mark, ranks him tied for 5th all time in Nebraska.

== College career ==
Ankle surgery forced Crouch to redshirt for the 1997 co-national championship-winning season. In 1998, Bobby Newcombe began the season as the starting quarterback, but he was sidelined by a knee injury after the first game and Crouch took over the starting duties. Against UAB, Crouch rushed for two touchdowns and completed 11 of 17 passes in his first career start. 1998 proved to be a chaotic season for the Cornhuskers. Crouch made another start before being replaced by a healthy Bobby Newcombe. Newcombe started the next five games, but was pulled in the middle of a game because of a PCL strain. Senior walk-on Monte Christo took over for Newcombe and started the following week against Texas. With Texas leading 10–0 in the middle of the second quarter, Christo was pulled and replaced by Crouch. Crouch remained the starter for the rest of the season, which ended with a 23–20 loss to Arizona in the Holiday Bowl.

The next fall Newcombe was named the starting quarterback, and it was rumored that Crouch might leave the team. Crouch, however, was given significant playing time in the first and second games. He started the third game against Southern Mississippi, and Newcombe moved to wingback. Crouch led Nebraska in a season that saw NU avenge its only loss of the season in a rematch against Texas in the Big 12 Championship Game. The Cornhuskers finished the season with a 12–1 record and ranked No. 3 after defeating Tennessee in the Fiesta Bowl.

Crouch started every game in the 2000 season, which ended with a 66–17 trouncing of Northwestern in the Alamo Bowl. Nebraska's only losses during the 10–2 season were to eventual national champion, Oklahoma Sooners, and the Kansas State Wildcats.

In 2001 Crouch had his best year, breaking school or NCAA records almost weekly and appearing to be a serious contender for the Heisman Trophy. In the first game of the 2001 season, a 21–7 defeat of TCU, Crouch surpassed Tommie Frazier as Nebraska's all-time total offense leader. He became the Big 12 all-time career rushing quarterback in the emotionally charged game against Rice. The following week, against Missouri, Crouch was backed up near the goal line when he scrambled to escape from defenders and pulled off a 95-yard touchdown run, the longest in school history. Against Iowa State the following week, Crouch broke the record for career touchdowns by a quarterback. Crouch became only the fourth player in Division 1 history to both pass and rush for 3,000 yards in a career with his performance against Texas Tech. Next, in a hard-fought game against defending national champion Oklahoma, Crouch again showed off his speed and playmaking abilities, this time serving as quarterback and receiver in a single play, the famous "Black 41 Flash Reverse" in which Crouch made a 63-yard touchdown reception. By mid-November Crouch had set a school record for most career wins as a starter and became only the ninth quarterback in D-1A history to have won 35 games as a starter. The Cornhuskers were 11–0 going into the annual contest with Colorado the day after Thanksgiving. While playing from behind the whole game, Crouch set the school record for offense yards in a single game with 360 yards. The Nebraska defense was dominated by the Buffaloes, however, and gave up a then-record 62 points to Colorado. The 62–36 loss did not end Nebraska's hopes of playing for the national championship and Crouch's chances of winning the Heisman.

Two weeks later, Crouch was announced as the recipient of the award, edging out Florida's Rex Grossman and Miami's Ken Dorsey in the closest Heisman ballot since 1985. His outstanding season also was recognized when he won the Davey O'Brien Award for being the best collegiate quarterback in the nation during the 2001 season. In the meantime, several highly ranked teams were upset and in the final BCS rankings, Nebraska beat out one-loss Oregon and two-loss Colorado to earn the No. 2 spot in the BCS rankings. The final BCS rankings were steeped in controversy, with Nebraska going to the Rose Bowl for the national championship despite not winning a conference or division championship. In the Rose Bowl on January 3, 2002, Crouch rushed for 114 yards against the Miami Hurricanes but was denied a touchdown for the first time since September, 1999. The No. 1 Hurricanes defeated the Cornhuskers 37–14, leaving Crouch with a 35–7 record as a starting quarterback.

=== Awards ===
- 2001 Heisman Trophy
- 2001 Walter Camp Award
- 2001 Davey O'Brien Award
- 2001 Big 12 Conference offensive player of the year
- 2000 Third-Team All-American (College Football News)
- 2000 Second-Team All-Big 12 (AP, Sporting News, Dallas Morning News, Houston Chronicle)
- 2000 Third-Team All-Big 12 (Coaches)
- 2000 Fiesta Bowl Offensive MVP vs. Tennessee
- 1999 Big 12 Co-Offensive Player of the Year (Coaches)

=== Records ===
- One of three quarterbacks in Division I-A history to rush for 3,000 and pass for 4,000 yards in a career
- 13th player in NCAA to rush and pass for 1,000 in a season (1,115 rushing, 1,510 passing)
- Nebraska career total offense leader with 7,915 yards
- Former Nebraska single-season total offense leader with 2,688 yards
- Former Nebraska single-game total offense record of 360 yards
- Nebraska career total-offense touchdown leader with 88
- Owns Nebraska career record for most rushing yards by a quarterback (3,434)
- NCAA record for most career rushing touchdowns by a quarterback (59)
- Most rushing attempts by a Husker quarterback (648)
- Former Nebraska total TD passes in a game (5 vs. Iowa)
- Most rushing TDs in a game by a quarterback (4 vs. Kansas)
- Set a QB record for most rushing TDs in a season (20)
- Set school records in 2001 for most rushing attempts in a season for a quarterback (203)
- Most total offense yards by a sophomore (2,158)
- Tied an NCAA record by scoring a TD via run, pass, reception in the same game (vs. University of California, Berkeley, 1999)
- Nebraska school record longest run from scrimmage, 95 yards (vs. Missouri, 2001)

=== College statistics ===
Season	Team	Games			Passing								Rushing			
Season	Team	GP	GS	Record	Cmp	Att	Pct	Yds	Avg	TD	Int	Rate	Att	Yds	Avg	TD
1997	Nebraska	Redshirt														
1998	Nebraska	8	5	4–1	49	101	48.5	601	6.0	4	4	103.6	96	459	4.8	5
1999	Nebraska	12	10	9–1	83	160	51.9	1,269	7.9	7	4	127.9	180	889	4.9	16
2000	Nebraska	11	11	9–2	75	156	48.1	1,101	7.1	11	7	121.3	169	971	5.7	20
2001	Nebraska	12	12	11–1	105	189	55.6	1,510	8.0	7	10	124.3	203	1,115	5.5	18
Total		43	38	33–5	312	606	51.5	4,481	7.4	29	25	121.1	648	3,434	5.3	59

== Professional career ==
Pre-draft measurables
Height	Weight	Arm length	Hand span	40-yard dash	10-yard split	20-yard split	20-yard shuttle	Three-cone drill	Vertical jump	Broad jump	Wonderlic
5 ft 11 7/8 in (1.83 m)	195 lb (88 kg)	30 1/4 in (0.77 m)	9 3/4 in (0.25 m)	4.47 s	1.57 s	2.62 s	4.02 s	6.87 s	36 in (0.91 m)	9 ft 4 in (2.84 m)	24
All values from NFL Combine

=== NFL and NFL Europe ===
Crouch was initially drafted by the St. Louis Rams of the NFL as a wide receiver, but still wanted to play quarterback. Crouch, however, was seen by NFL teams as being too short to play quarterback. His athleticism was seen as better suited for playing wideout. However, he suffered an injury to his leg that caused a large buildup of blood that had to be drained twice, plus months of recovery. Crouch did not travel with the team to the season opener against the Denver Broncos on September 8. On September 10, Rams head coach Mike Martz stated that Crouch was still "light years away from playing." Crouch retired from football on September 11, 2002. In 2009, Crouch denied that he refused to play wide receiver when it came to leaving the Rams. He was waived by the Rams on April 18, 2003.

Crouch was claimed off waivers by the Green Bay Packers on April 23, 2003, as a kick returner and quarterback. He retired again on July 21, 2003. In March 2004, he was reactivated by the Packers to try out for the team at free safety. Crouch was released on June 2, 2004.

Crouch signed with the Kansas City Chiefs in January 2005, and was allocated to the Hamburg Sea Devils of NFL Europe. He played in eight games, starting seven, as a safety for the Sea Devils during the 2005 NFL Europe season, recording 23 tackles on defense, two tackles on special teams, and two pass breakups. He was released by the Chiefs on June 7, 2005.

=== CFL ===
Crouch's opportunity to play quarterback at the professional level finally came when he signed with the Toronto Argonauts of the Canadian Football League on February 15, 2006 as a quarterback. (The Argonauts had owned his CFL rights for several years.) In his inaugural CFL season Crouch eventually became the fourth-string quarterback in Toronto, behind Damon Allen, Michael Bishop, and Spergon Wynn. On July 22, 2006, Crouch made his regular season CFL debut against the Saskatchewan Roughriders in Regina, Saskatchewan. Coming in at the start of the second half following an injury to Wynn, Crouch sealed the win for Toronto with solid play, including a 94-yard pass completion to Arland Bruce III. Overall, he dressed in seven games for the Argonauts during the 2006 season, completing six of 13 passes for 127 yards and one interception.

In 2007 Crouch was expected to battle Michael Bishop, Damon Allen, Mike McMahon and Tom Arth for the Argos' starting quarterback position, but he eventually faltered because of injury. He began the season on the nine-week disabled list. After coming off the disabled list, Crouch was released by the Argonauts on September 6, 2007.

=== AAFL ===
On September 25, 2007, Crouch signed with the upstart All-American Football League. He was drafted 3rd overall by Team Texas on January 26, 2008, in the first round of the league's inaugural draft. He was, however, released from his contract (along with all AAFL players) when the league canceled its debut season.

=== UFL ===
On April 9, 2011, Crouch attended a public workout for the United Football League's Omaha Nighthawks. On June 8, 2011, Crouch accepted an invitation to attend the Nighthawks mini-camp. On June 10, 2011, he was added to the Nighthawks official roster. He played in, and started, one game for the Nighthawks during the 2011 season, completing nine of 24 passes for 124 yards and one interception. He was placed on injured reserve on September 21, 2011, and became a free agent after the season.

== Coaching career ==
Crouch served as the special teams coordinator and running backs coach at Midland University from 2018 to 2021.

== Post-playing career ==
Eric Crouch was a sales territory manager for a major medical device manufacturer in the US. Currently, Crouch is a vendor of playground and recreation equipment at Crouch Recreation in Omaha, Nebraska.

He has been a TV studio analyst for KETV Channel 7 in Omaha, and a studio analyst on Versus. Crouch joined Fox College Football as an In-Game Analyst for FX in 2013.

In August 2025, Millard North High School renamed a road into the school as Eric Crouch Street.

== See also ==
- List of Division I FBS rushing touchdown leaders
