= Erwin Swiney =

American football player (born 1978)

No. 26
- Position: Cornerback

Personal information
- Born: October 8, 1978 (age 48); Dallas, Texas, U.S.
- Listed height: 6 ft 0 in (1.83 m)
- Listed weight: 195 lb (88 kg)

Career information
- High school: Lincoln Northeast (Lincoln, Nebraska)
- College: Nebraska
- NFL draft: 2002: undrafted

Career history
- Green Bay Packers (2002–2004); Cologne Centurions (2004)

Awards and highlights
- National champion (1997)

Career NFL statistics
- Tackles: 5
- Stats at Pro Football Reference

Erwin Bernard Swiney Jr. (born October 8, 1978) is an American former professional football player who was a cornerback for three seasons with the Green Bay Packers of the National Football League (NFL). He played college football for the Nebraska Cornhuskers. He did not see any playing time with the Packers in a regular season game during his final season in 2004. He also played with the Cologne Centurions of NFL Europe in 2004.

== College statistics ==
Year	School	Conf	G	GS	Erwin Swiney					Tackles				Interceptions
Year	School	Conf	G	GS	Solo	Ast	Tot	Sacks	Sacks-Yards	Int	PD	FF	FR	
1997	Nebraska	B12	13	10	18	11	29	0	0	2	5	0	2	
1998	Nebraska	B12	13	13	34	29	63	2	2–12	0	13	0	1	
2000	Nebraska	B12	12	10	19	6	25	0	0	1	13	0	0	
2001	Nebraska	B12	10	3	14	4	26	0.5	0.5-3	2	13	1	0	

Notes - Statistics include bowl game performances.
