= Dahrran Diedrick =

Canadian gridiron football player (1979–2023)

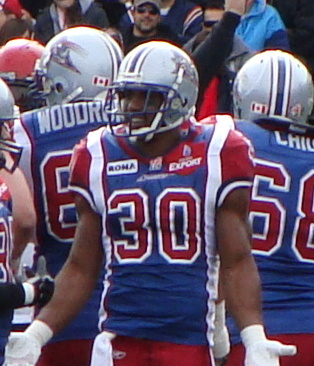
- Diedrick with the Montreal Alouettes in 2009

Profile
- Position: Running back

Personal information
- Born: January 11, 1979; Montego Bay, Jamaica
- Died: June 24, 2023 (aged 44); Toronto, Canada
- Listed height: 6 ft 0 in (1.83 m)
- Listed weight: 225 lb (102 kg)

Career information
- High school: Cedarbrae Collegiate Institute (Toronto)
- College: Nebraska
- CFL draft: 2002: 3rd round, 24th overall pick

Career history
- 2003: San Diego Chargers*
- 2003–2004: Green Bay Packers*
- 2004: Washington Redskins
- 2005: Rhein Fire
- 2005–2006: Edmonton Eskimos
- 2006–2013: Montreal Alouettes
- 2013: Hamilton Tiger-Cats
- 2014: Montreal Alouettes
- * Offseason or practice squad member only

Awards and highlights
- 3× Grey Cup champion (2005, 2009, 2010); Second-team All-Big 12 (2001)
- Stats at Pro Football Reference
- Stats at CFL.ca (archive)

Dahrran Diedrick (January 11, 1979 – June 24, 2023) was a Canadian professional football player who was a running back in the Canadian Football League (CFL). He was a three-time Grey Cup champion, winning with the Edmonton Eskimos in 2005 and the Montreal Alouettes in 2009 and 2010. Diedrick played college football in the United States with the Nebraska Cornhuskers. He began his pro career in the National Football League (NFL) with the San Diego Chargers, Green Bay Packers, and Washington Redskins. He played for ten seasons in the CFL, primarily with the Alouettes.

== Early life ==
Diedrick was born in Montego Bay, Jamaica, on January 11, 1979, to Karen Moulton and Kenneth Diedrick. When he was 12, he moved with his mother to Toronto, while his father remained in Jamaica. He played high school ball at Cedarbrae Collegiate Institute, and rushed for almost 1,900 yards in nine games as a senior.

== College career ==
Diedrick attended the University of Nebraska–Lincoln, becoming the Cornhuskers' first Canadian recruit to receive a scholarship in 1998. After using a redshirt season, he played college football for Nebraska from 1999 to 2002. He was a backup in his first two years behind Dan Alexander and Correll Buckhalter. Diedrick became a starter in 2001. In an offense featuring Heisman Trophy-winning quarterback Eric Crouch, he led the Big 12 Conference with 1,299 rushing yards and scored 15 touchdowns while sharing time with Thunder Collins. The Cornhuskers played in the 2002 Rose Bowl for the national championship, but lost 37–14 to Miami. Diedrick finished his four-year career at Nebraska with 502 carries for 2,745 yards and 26 touchdowns, and earned his undergraduate criminal justice degree with a 3.165 cumulative GPA in 2001.

== Professional career ==
Diedrick was drafted by the Edmonton Eskimos in the third round, 24th overall, in the 2002 CFL draft, but returned to school for his senior year.

=== NFL ===
Following the conclusion of his college career, Diedrick was signed by the San Diego Chargers after going undrafted in the 2003 NFL draft. He was also a member of the Green Bay Packers and Washington Redskins, the latter of which he played his only NFL regular season game with in 2004.

=== Edmonton Eskimos ===
Diedrick signed with Edmonton on September 11, 2005. He joined the team as a non-import player, and was expected to be the CFL's next great Canadian running back. He played in seven games, where he had ten carries for 31 yards as a backup to starter Troy Davis. He also had eight punt returns for 159 yards, and one blocked punt. He won his first Grey Cup championship following the Eskimos' victory over the Montreal Alouettes in the 93rd Grey Cup game. In 2006, he dressed in three games, but was released on July 17, 2006.

=== Montreal Alouettes ===
On July 24, 2006, Diedrick signed with the Montreal Alouettes. He played as a running back, fullback, and on special teams. He recorded his highest single-season rushing total in 2008 when he had 42 carries for 263 yards. He later won his second career Grey Cup championship in the 2009 victory over the Saskatchewan Roughriders.

Diedrick scored his first career touchdown on an improbable play against the Toronto Argonauts on October 29, 2010, when Alouettes kicker Damon Duval missed a potentially game-winning field goal which was kicked back and forth out of the end zone until it was eventually fumbled and recovered by Diedrick for the game-winning touchdown. He capped off the 2010 season by winning his third Grey Cup following the 98th Grey Cup game. In 2011, Diedrick was featured more in short-yardage situations and scored the first six rushing touchdowns of his career, while also recording 49 carries for 196 yards.

=== Hamilton Tiger-Cats ===
On July 1, 2013, Diedrick was traded to the Hamilton Tiger-Cats in exchange for a fourth-round pick in the 2014 CFL draft. He played in nine games for the Tiger-Cats where he had one catch for ten yards and three special teams tackles.

=== Montreal Alouettes (second stint) ===
Diedrick re-signed with the Montreal Alouettes on July 15, 2014. He played in four games that year, but his professional football career came to an end during the 2014 season when he was diagnosed with hepatosplenic gamma-delta T-cell lymphoma. He had played in 130 career games where he had 179 carries for 872 yards and six touchdowns along with 49 special teams tackles.

== Illness and death ==
After having his enlarged spleen removed in August 2015 and multiple rounds of chemotherapy, Diedrick underwent a stem cell transplantation in June 2016 with his daughter, Dominique, serving as the donor. His health returned, and he spent the 2017 season as a strength and conditioning coach for the Toronto Argonauts, winning his fourth Grey Cup.

Diedrick died from hepatosplenic gamma-delta T-cell lymphoma at Toronto General Hospital on June 24, 2023, aged 44.
