= Trevor Johnson (American football) =

American football player (born 1981)

No. 97, 95, 93
- Position: Defensive end

Personal information
- Born: February 26, 1981 (age 45); Gordon, Nebraska, U.S.
- Listed height: 6 ft 5 in (1.96 m)
- Listed weight: 260 lb (118 kg)

Career information
- High school: Lincoln Northeast (Lincoln, Nebraska)
- College: Nebraska
- NFL draft: 2004: 7th round, 234th overall pick

Career history
- New York Jets (2004–2006); New Orleans Saints (2006); St. Louis Rams (2007); Kansas City Chiefs (2008)*
- * Offseason or practice squad member only

Career NFL statistics
- Total tackles: 42
- Pass deflections: 1
- Stats at Pro Football Reference

Trevor Johnson (born February 26, 1981) is an American former professional football player who was a defensive end in the National Football League (NFL). He played college football for the Nebraska Cornhuskers and was selected in the seventh round of the 2004 NFL draft. Johnson played in the NFL for the New York Jets, New Orleans Saints and St. Louis Rams.

== Early life ==
Johnson was born in Gordon, Nebraska. He was a standout three-sport athlete in football, basketball and track at Lincoln Northeast High School.

== College career ==
Johnson played college football for the Nebraska Cornhuskers. He was a four-time Academic All-Big 12 Conference selection at the University of Nebraska–Lincoln, where he also garnered Academic All-America honors as a senior. Johnson started 22 of 46 games (39 on defense and 10 on offense), recording 131 tackles with 7.5 sacks, 22 stops for losses, 25 quarterback pressures, three fumble recoveries, a forced fumble and four pass deflections. He made 68 tackles, 4.0 sacks, three passes defensed, two forced fumbles and one blocked punt as a senior. He started nine games between right defensive end and left defensive end as a junior and finished season with 54 tackles and 3.5 sacks. He switched to rush end from tight end as a sophomore and played in all 12 games. He played in 10 games as a backup tight end during freshman year.

== Professional career ==
=== Pre-draft ===
Johnson (6 ft 4 3/8 in, 1.940 m; 259 lb, 117 kg) had a complete workout at combine, but he did everything again at the Pro Day. He ran 4.69 seconds in the 40-yard dash. He had a 38 1/2-inch (980 mm) vertical jump, clocked 4.14 seconds in the short shuttle and 6.88 seconds in the three-cone drill.

=== New York Jets ===
Johnson was selected by the New York Jets in the seventh round of the 2004 NFL draft. He played in all sixteen regular season games and two playoff contests in rookie season for New York Jets, and registered fifteen tackles (eight solo). He played in nine games and saw action on special teams and defense and totaled ten tackles. He was inactive for the first three games of the 2006 season with New York before being waived on September 26, 2006.

=== New Orleans Saints ===
Johnson was signed as free agent by the New Orleans Saints on November 29, 2006, and was inactive for one game. He played in the season finale against the Carolina Panthers on December 31, 2006, and totaled four tackles.

=== St. Louis Rams ===
Johnson joined the St. Louis Rams on February 5, 2007, on a waiver claim from the New Orleans Saints.

=== Kansas City Chiefs ===
He was signed and then released.
