= Ryon Bingham =

American football player (born 1981)

No. 97
- Positions: Defensive end, defensive tackle

Personal information
- Born: June 6, 1981 (age 45); Salt Lake City, Utah, U.S.
- Listed height: 6 ft 3 in (1.91 m)
- Listed weight: 303 lb (137 kg)

Career information
- High school: Alta (Sandy, Utah)
- College: Nebraska
- NFL draft: 2004: 7th round, 204th overall pick

Career history
- San Diego Chargers (2004–2009)

Awards and highlights
- First-team All-Big 12 (2003)

Career NFL statistics
- Total tackles: 80
- Sacks: 4.5
- Stats at Pro Football Reference

Ryon Jeffry Bingham (born June 6, 1981) is an American former professional football player who was a defensive tackle in the National Football League (NFL). He attended Alta High School located in Sandy, Utah, and played college football for the Nebraska Cornhuskers. Bingham was released from the San Diego Chargers in 2010.

== Early life ==
Bingham was a standout football player and a two-time Class 5A heavyweight wrestling champion. He played offensive tackle and nose guard at Alta High School in Sandy, Utah. The Salt Lake Tribune Defensive Player of the Year, Gatorade Player of the year, Bingham earned All-State honors and was the Utah Player of the Year. In 1998, Bingham recorded 87 tackles, 14 sacks, four pass breakups, five fumbles caused and two recoveries. As a junior, he had 50 tackles and 13 sacks, helping his team to a 9-2 record and a state semifinal appearance in Utah’s largest class. As a heavyweight, Bingham went 64-1 with 58 pins en route to state championships in both 1998 and 1999, compiling a 28-0 mark with 25 pins as a senior.

== College career ==
Bingham attended the University of Nebraska–Lincoln and was a Criminal Justice Major and a letterman in football. In football, as a junior, he was an Honorable Mention All-Big 12 Conference selection and an Academic All-Big 12 Conference selection. As a senior, he was an All-Big 12 Conference selection. In 2003, Bingham led Nebraska's interior defensive linemen with 56 total tackles. For his standout play, Bingham earned second-team All-Big 12 honors. In 2002, as a junior, he finished the season with 67 total tackles. He recorded nine tackles for loss, including 1.5 sacks. Bingham saw significant action in 2001 as part of a four-man rotation at the two defensive tackle positions. He played in all 12 games as Jon Clanton’s backup at nose tackle, and finished the year with 18 tackles, including five for losses. Bingham was expected to see action as a redshirt freshman in 2000, but a broken right foot kept him out for the entire season. He was cast in August, then had surgery in September. Bingham redshirted in 1999.

== Professional career ==
Bingham was selected in the seventh round of the 2004 NFL draft by the San Diego Chargers. The Chargers released him on September 1, 2010.
