= Demoine Adams =

American gridiron football player (born 1980)

Profile
- Position: Defensive end

Personal information
- Born: August 17, 1980 (age 46)
- Listed height: 6 ft 2 in (1.88 m)
- Listed weight: 235 lb (107 kg)

Career information
- High school: Pine Bluff HS
- College: Nebraska

Career history
- 2004: Edmonton Eskimos

Demoine Adams (born August 17, 1980) is a Canadian football defensive end who played for the Edmonton Eskimos of the Canadian Football League. Adams played in one regular season game, recording one tackle.
