= Jerrell Pippens =

American football player (born 1980)

No. 27, 36, 28, 12
- Position: Defensive back

Personal information
- Born: June 30, 1980 (age 46); Philadelphia, Pennsylvania, U.S.
- Listed height: 6 ft 2 in (1.88 m)
- Listed weight: 207 lb (94 kg)

Career information
- High school: West Philadelphia Catholic
- College: Nebraska Cornhuskers (1999–2003)
- NFL draft: 2004: undrafted

Career history
- San Diego Chargers (2004); Chicago Bears (2004); San Diego Chargers (2005); Washington Redskins (2007)*; Saskatchewan Roughriders (2007)
- * Offseason or practice squad member only
- Stats at Pro Football Reference

Jerrell L. Pippens (born June 30, 1980) is an American former professional football defensive back who played in the National Football League (NFL) with the San Diego Chargers and Chicago Bears. He played college football for the Nebraska Cornhuskers.

== Early life ==
Jerrell L. Pippens was born on June 30, 1980, in Philadelphia, Pennsylvania. He attended West Philadelphia Catholic High School.

== College career ==
Pippens enrolled at the University of Nebraska–Lincoln to play college football for the Cornhuskers. He redshirted the 1999 season and was a four-year letterman from 2000 to 2003, mostly in a backup and special teams role. He made his first-career start on November 8, 2003, against Kansas in place of Lornell McPherson, who was serving as a pallbearer at a funeral. Pippens threw up before the game in a bathroom for unclear reasons. He had six solo tackles, four assisted tackles, one interception, and one blocked field goal as Nebraska won 24–3. He finished the 2003 season with two interceptions.

== Professional career ==
After going undrafted in the 2004 NFL draft, Pippens signed with the San Diego Chargers on May 7, 2004. He was waived on September 5 and signed to the team's practice squad on September 7. He was promoted to the active roster on October 27 and played in seven games for the Chargers during the 2004 season, posting three solo tackles and one fumble recovery. Pippens was waived on December 20, 2004.

Pippens was claimed off waivers by the Chicago Bears on December 21, 2004. He appeared in the final two games of the 2004 regular season for the Bears and recorded one solo tackle. He was waived on September 4, 2005, before the start of the 2005 season.

Pippens signed with the Chargers again on December 20, 2005. He played in the final two games of the 2005 season for San Diego but did not record any statistics. He was waived on August 28, 2006.

On January 4, 2007, Pippens signed a reserve/future contract with the Washington Redskins. He was waived on May 11, 2007.

Pippens played in one game for the Saskatchewan Roughriders of the Canadian Football League (CFL) during the 2007 season. He was released on August 9, 2007.
