= Kyle Larson (American football) =

American football player (born 1980)

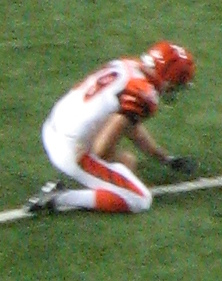
- Larson with the Cincinnati Bengals in 2007

No. 19
- Position: Punter

Personal information
- Born: September 2, 1980 (age 46); Kearney, Nebraska, U.S.
- Listed height: 6 ft 1 in (1.85 m)
- Listed weight: 204 lb (93 kg)

Career information
- High school: Kearney
- College: Nebraska
- NFL draft: 2004: undrafted

Career history
- Cincinnati Bengals (2004–2008)

Awards and highlights
- PFWA All-Rookie Team (2004); First-team All-American (2003); First-team All-Big 12 (2003); Second-team All-Big 12 (2002)

Career NFL statistics
- Punts: 379
- Punt yards: 15,900
- Punting yard average: 42.0
- Longest punt: 75
- Punts inside the 20: 109
- Stats at Pro Football Reference

Kyle Larson (born September 2, 1980) is an American former professional football player who was a punter in the National Football League (NFL). He was signed by the Cincinnati Bengals as an undrafted free agent in 2004. He played college football for the Nebraska Cornhuskers.

== Early life ==
Larson attended Kearney High School in Kearney, Nebraska, but is a native of Funk, Nebraska. He saw action at center, linebacker, and punter, and as a senior, he won All-State honors at punter after averaging 46.5 yards per punt. In addition to football, Larson competed in track and field. Larson was a member of Kearney High's 1999 Class A State Championship team where he placed 2nd in discus and 3rd in shot put at the Nebraska State Track Meet.

== College career ==
Larson was a walk-on at the University of Nebraska–Lincoln. Following a redshirt season in 1999, he backed up starter Dan Hadenfeldt in 2000. He then started from 2001 to 2003. Larson played in the 2002 BCS National Championship Game vs. the Miami Hurricanes, and helped Nebraska beat Michigan State in the 2003 Alamo Bowl. He was a semifinalist for the Ray Guy Award his junior year, and finalist his senior year, as well as being named an All-American by the American Football Coaches Association. He benched 405 pounds his senior year and hang cleaned 458. As a senior in 2003, Larson set a school record with a 45.1-yard avg. on 66 punts, the record would later be broken by Sam Koch. Larson also earned All-Big 12 honors. He graduated with a degree in business administration.

== Professional career ==
Larson was signed by the Cincinnati Bengals as a college free agent on April 27, 2004. He made his NFL debut at the New York Jets on September 12. In his opening season he averaged 42.2 yards from 83 punts and even scored a touchdown from a fake field goal attempt at the New England Patriots on December 12. He was part of the Bengals turn around, helping them get their first winning season in 15 years, by becoming the AFC North Champions in 2005. Larson played in the AFC Wild-Card Playoff Game against the Pittsburgh Steelers on January 8, 2006. He played in every game in his five seasons with the Bengals.

Larson was waived on April 28, 2009.

== NFL career statistics ==
Legend
	Led the league
**Bold**	Career high

=== Regular season ===
Year	Team	Punting									
Year	Team	GP	Punts	Yds	Net Yds	Lng	Avg	Net Avg	Blk	Ins20	TB
2004	CIN	**16**	83	3,499	2,981	66	42.2	35.5	**1**	21	7
2005	CIN	**16**	60	2,591	2,171	**75**	43.2	35.6	**1**	13	8
2006	CIN	**16**	77	3,428	2,972	67	**44.5**	**38.6**	0	26	**11**
2007	CIN	**16**	59	2,437	2,078	55	41.3	35.2	0	21	3
2008	CIN	**16**	**100**	**3,945**	**3,449**	57	39.5	34.1	**1**	**28**	3
Career		80	379	15,900	13,651	75	42.0	35.7	3	109	32

=== Playoffs ===
Year	Team	Punting									
Year	Team	GP	Punts	Yds	Net Yds	Lng	Avg	Net Avg	Blk	Ins20	TB
2005	CIN	**1**	**3**	**131**	**110**	**51**	**43.7**	**36.7**	0	0	0
Career		1	3	131	110	51	43.7	36.7	0	0	0

== Personal life ==
Kyle and his wife Lindsay have 4 sons. He holds a degree in business administration from University of Nebraska–Lincoln, and during his college career he was three-time member of Big 12 Commissioner's Academic Honor Roll. Hobbies include working on his family's farm in Nebraska as well as hunting and fishing. Kyle was inducted into the Nebraska Football Hall of Fame in 2018.
