= Toniu Fonoti =

American football player (born 1981)

No. 71, 77, 79
- Position: Guard

Personal information
- Born: November 26, 1981 (age 44); American Samoa
- Listed height: 6 ft 4 in (1.93 m)
- Listed weight: 340 lb (154 kg)

Career information
- High school: Kahuku (Kahuku, Hawaii, U.S.)
- College: Nebraska
- NFL draft: 2002: 2nd round, 39th overall pick

Career history
- San Diego Chargers (2002–2005); Minnesota Vikings (2005); Tampa Bay Buccaneers (2006)*; Miami Dolphins (2006); Atlanta Falcons (2007)*; Carolina Panthers (2008)*; Detroit Lions (2009)*
- * Offseason or practice squad member only

Awards and highlights
- Consensus All-American (2001); First-team All-Big 12 (2001); Second-team All-Big 12 (2000)

Career NFL statistics
- Games played: 40
- Games started: 33
- Stats at Pro Football Reference

Toniuolevaiavea Satele Fonoti (born November 26, 1981) is an American-Samoan former professional player of American football who was a guard in the National Football League (NFL). He played college football for the Nebraska Cornhuskers and earned consensus All-American honors. The San Diego Chargers picked him in the second round of the 2002 NFL draft, and he played professionally for the Chargers, Minnesota Vikings and Miami Dolphins of the NFL.

== Early life ==
Fonoti was born in American Samoa but partly raised in Apia. He attended El Camino High School in Oceanside, California, and played high school football for the El Camino Wildcats. He played his last two years of high school for the Kahuku Red Raiders, located on the north shore of Oahu and earned all-state 1st team honors.

== College career ==
Fonoti attended the University of Nebraska–Lincoln, where he played for the Nebraska Cornhuskers from 1999 to 2001. He is only the third freshman in Nebraska team history to earn playing time on the Cornhuskers' offensive line. He was a first-team All-Big 12 selection in 2000 and 2001, and was recognized as a consensus first-team All-American following his 2001 junior season. He was also a semifinalist for the Lombardi Award and a finalist for the Outland Trophy. During his time as a Cornhusker, he set three team records: single-game record 32 pancake blocks vs. Texas Tech (2001); single-season record of 201 pancake blocks (2001); and career record of 379 pancakes.

== Professional career ==
=== Pre-draft ===
Projected as a late first round selection, Fonoti was rated as the No. 1 offensive guard available in the 2002 NFL draft by Sports Illustrated. He was noted for "[obliterating] defenders at the line of scrimmage", and "[keeping] his feet moving in pass protection and anchors, not giving up an inch of ground".

Pre-draft measurables
Height	Weight	40-yard dash	10-yard split	20-yard split	20-yard shuttle	Three-cone drill	Vertical jump	Broad jump	Bench press
6 ft 3 7/8 in (1.93 m)	349 lb (158 kg)	5.49 s	1.94 s	3.13 s	4.81 s	8.12 s	28 1/2 in (0.72 m)	8 ft 1 in (2.46 m)	32 reps
All values from NFL Combine

=== San Diego Chargers ===
Fonoti was selected by the San Diego Chargers in the second round, with the 39th overall pick, of the 2002 NFL draft.

=== Minnesota Vikings ===
On October 18, 2005, Fonoti was traded to the Minnesota Vikings for a conditional 2006 draft pick.

=== Tampa Bay Buccaneers ===
Fonoti signed with the Tampa Bay Buccaneers on March 20, 2006. He was released on September 2, 2006.

=== Miami Dolphins ===
Fonoti signed with the Miami Dolphins on November 7, 2006.

=== Atlanta Falcons ===
Fonoti signed with the Atlanta Falcons as an unrestricted free agent on March 14, 2007, and was released on August 4, 2007.

=== Carolina Panthers ===
Fonoti signed with the Carolina Panthers on March 25, 2008, and was released on August 30, 2008.

=== Detroit Lions ===
Fonoti signed with the Detroit Lions on May 5, 2009. He was waived on August 11 when the team signed wide receiver Billy McMullen.

== Personal life ==
Fonoti has a brother, Tauala'i, who plays football at Stanford and another younger brother, La'auli, who plays football at New Mexico State University. His sister, Dionne Fonoti, is a lecturer at the National University of Samoa.

In September 2022, he was inducted into the Nebraska Football Hall of Fame.
