= Eric Clemons =

American sportscaster

Eric Clemons is an American sportscaster formerly of ESPN and FOX Sports. In the past he has worked for national, and regional outlets, including BET and also served as a sports reporter and anchor for a number of local television stations.

== Early life ==
Eric Clemons was born in early November 1959 on the South Side of Chicago, Illinois to a low income family. After attending Chicago Vocational High School, Clemons was accepted at Columbia College to study Broadcast Communications. Upon graduating in 1981, Eric eventually was offered his first commercial television job as a sports anchor/reporter for WALA-TV in Mobile, Alabama.

== Career timeline ==
| 1984-1987 | WALA-TV (Mobile, AL), sports reporter/anchor |
| 1987–1991 | ESPN (Bristol, CT), anchor and reporter |
| 1991–1994 | WHDH-TV (Boston, MA), sports anchor and reporter |
| 1994-2001 | Fox Sports (Los Angeles, CA), NFL/college sports reporter/host/play-by-play |
| 1997–2003 | WFSB-TV (Hartford, CT), sports anchor and reporter |
| 2004–2007 | WVUE-TV (New Orleans, LA), sports director |
| 2005-2006 | BET Network (Washington, D.C.), play-by-play/host |
| 2009-2022 | Connecticut Public Television, reporter and host |
| 2013-2016 | WTIC-TV, freelance sports reporter/anchor |
| 2016–2017 | ESPN (Bristol, CT), college Flllootball play-by-play |

== Personal life ==
Eric Clemons is a father of two and has been married since December 1984. His wife, Renita McKay Clemons, also grew up on the south side of Chicago. She is a writer/educator pursuing her 2nd master's degree in English and Social Studies Education. Eric has 2 older siblings and a large extended family. His daughter, 36, is a grad student in the San Francisco, CA area and his son, 32, is an independent contractor and formerly of the United States Air Force.

Clemons returned to school well into his broadcast career and completed his master's degree in Interactive Communications Media from Quinnipiac University. He has engaged in public speaking events for local schools, churches, and community colleges, and dabbled in the performing arts. Clemons was the lead in the Repertory Theater of New Britain's production of Blues in the Night, which led to his stint as one of the front line vocalists of the popular Motown /Soul cover band 'Soul Sound Revue'.(2010–2022) He also loves African/African American history, and has a travel vlog, "The Baby Boomer Cruiser."
