= Boyd Epley =

American strength coach and founder of the NSCA

Boyd Epley (born June 2nd 1947) is an American strength and conditioning coach best known for founding the National Strength and Conditioning Association (NSCA) in 1978 and for pioneering the role of strength coach in collegiate athletics. He served as the first full-time strength and conditioning coach in college football when hired by the University of Nebraska–Lincoln in 1969. Epley's methods contributed to Huskers's athletic dominance and influenced the professionalization of strength training in American sports.

== Early life and education ==
Epley was a pole vaulter at Nebraska before a back injury ended his athletic career. In 1969, while rehabbing from injury, he began assisting football players in the weight room. Head football coach Bob Devaney later hired him, making Epley the first full-time strength coach in collegiate sports.

== Career at Nebraska ==
Epley founded Nebraska’s strength and conditioning program, "Husker Power," in 1969, which became a national model. During his tenure, Nebraska won five national championships and over 250 conference titles across sports. His program integrated measurable athletic testing through the "Performance Index," allowing comparisons of player development.

Epley returned to Nebraska Athletics in 2014 as Assistant Athletic Director for Strength and Conditioning, overseeing multiple sports. He retired from Nebraska Athletics in 2020 after more than four decades with the program.

== Founding of the NSCA ==
In 1978, Epley organized a meeting in Lincoln with 76 strength coaches, leading to the formation of the National Strength and Conditioning Association. The NSCA aimed to unify the profession and promote scientific research in training practices. Under Epley's leadership, the organization grew rapidly and launched publications including the NSCA Journal and later the Journal of Strength and Conditioning Research (JSCR).

Epley’s vision included the certification of strength coaches. The NSCA launched the Certified Strength and Conditioning Specialist (CSCS) credential in 1985, helping establish professional standards in the field.

As of 2025, the NSCA reports over 60,000 members worldwide and continues to publish peer-reviewed research, host professional conferences, and advocate for standards in strength and conditioning.

== Legacy and influence ==
Epley is widely regarded as a founding figure in the profession of strength and conditioning. He helped redefine athletic preparation in American sports, introducing performance metrics and legitimizing weight training as a fundamental component of athletic development.

== See also ==
- Strength and conditioning coach
- Sports science
