= Thunder Collins =

American football player and convicted murderer (born 1979)

No. 21
- Position: Running back

Personal information
- Born: September 17, 1979 (age 47); Los Angeles, California, U.S.
- Listed height: 6 ft 1 in (1.85 m)
- Listed weight: 205 lb (93 kg)

Career information
- High school: Manual Arts (Los Angeles)
- College: Nebraska (2000–2002)
- NFL draft: 2003: undrafted

Career history
- Montreal Alouettes (2003)

Thunder Collins (born September 17, 1979) is an American former football running back. He played college football for three seasons at the University of Nebraska–Lincoln. He played one game for the Montreal Alouettes of the Canadian Football League in 2003.

In August, 2009, Collins was convicted of first-degree murder. Later, Collins was found guilty of attempted second-degree murder. Although Collins maintains his innocence, he has been sentenced to life in prison. His attorney's motion for a re-trial was denied in 2012.
