= 2001 Sugar Bowl =

2001 Nokia Sugar Bowl
- BCS Bowl Game; 67th Sugar Bowl
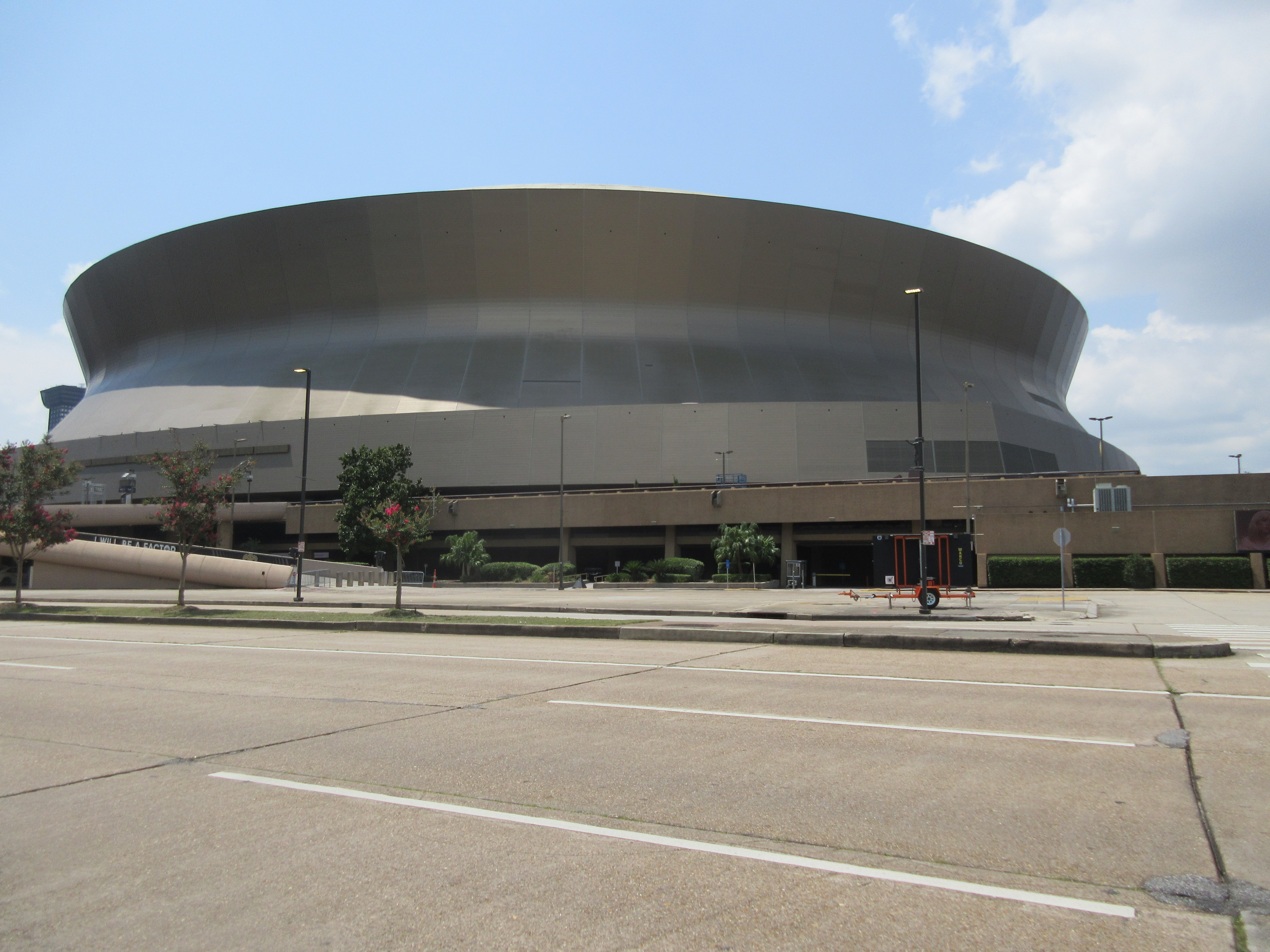
- The Louisiana Superdome in New Orleans, Louisiana, hosted the Sugar Bowl.
| Miami Hurricanes | Florida Gators |
| (10–1) | (10–2) |
| Big East | SEC |
| 37 | 20 |
| Head coach: Butch Davis | Head coach: Steve Spurrier |
| AP / Coaches / BCS; 2 / 2 / 3 | AP / Coaches / BCS; 7 / 7 / 7 |
| | 1 | 2 | 3 | 4 | Total |
|---|---|---|---|---|---|
| Miami | 10 | 3 | 14 | 10 | 37 |
| Florida | 7 | 3 | 7 | 3 | 20 |
- Date: January 2, 2001
- Season: 2000
- Stadium: Louisiana Superdome
- Location: New Orleans, Louisiana
- MVP: Ken Dorsey (QB, Miami)
- Favorite: Miami by 6 (58.5)
- Referee: Hal Dowden (Big XII)
- Attendance: 64,407

United States TV coverage
- Network: ABC
- Announcers: Brent Musburger (Play by Play); Gary Danielson (Analyst); Jack Arute (Sideline)
- Nielsen ratings: 13.0

The 2001 Sugar Bowl was a 2000–01 BCS game played on January 2, 2001. This 67th edition to the Sugar Bowl featured the Florida Gators, and the Miami Hurricanes, in an in-state rivalry game. Miami came into the game ranked 3rd in the BCS, 2nd in both the Coaches and AP Poll, at 10–1, whereas Florida came into the game ranked 7th in the BCS at 10–2. Sponsored by Nokia, the game was officially known as the Nokia Sugar Bowl.

== Teams ==
The Sugar Bowl during the BCS era usually selected the SEC champion, meaning that the winner of the SEC in 2000, Florida received an invitation to the Sugar Bowl. Their opponent would be Big East champion Miami, re-igniting a rivalry between the two teams, who hadn't faced off since 1987, when their annual series was ended due to an increase in conference games for the Gators.

=== Miami Hurricanes ===
Miami went undefeated in Big East conference play to win the conference title and earn a BCS berth as their conference's champion. The Hurricanes were seen as contender to play Oklahoma for the national title, however Florida State, a team Miami had defeated in the regular season, was selected leading to controversy over the BCS ranking system. Miami entered the bowl with a 10–1 record (7–0 in conference).

=== Florida Gators ===
Florida defeated Auburn in the 2000 SEC Championship Game to earn a berth in the Sugar Bowl as their conference's champion. Florida entered the bowl with a 10–2 record (7–1 in conference).

== Game summary ==
Florida started the scoring with a 23-yard touchdown pass from Florida quarterback Rex Grossman to tight end Kirk Wells. Miami responded with a 44-yard Todd Sievers field goal to trim the lead to 7–3. Later in the quarter, quarterback Ken Dorsey fired an 8-yard touchdown pass to tight end Jeremy Shockey, and Miami took a 10–7 lead after 1 quarter.

Todd Sievers kicked a 29-yard field goal in the second quarter to extend the lead to 13–7. Florida kicker Jeff Chandler kicked a 51-yard field goal before halftime to get the Gators to 13–10. In the third quarter, running back Earnest Graham rushed 36 yards for the go-ahead touchdown, and Florida took a 17–13 lead.

Ken Dorsey later fired a 19-yard touchdown pass to running back D.J. Williams, and Miami reclaimed the lead, 20–17. A Ken Dorsey touchdown later in the quarter increased the lead to 27–17. Florida got within 27–20 following a Jeff Chandler field goal, but Miami scored the game's final 10 points to close the scoring.

The game featured a rare penalty incurred by a mascot. Sebastian the Ibis received an unsportsmanlike conduct penalty for excessive celebration when he celebrated a Miami touchdown with Najeh Davenport.

Many believed that the Hurricanes were worthy of a national title shot against Oklahoma. Earlier in the season, the Canes defeated the Noles by a score of 27-24 and the debate was a serious discussion. Ultimately, Miami would have their day going on to win the title the following season. They had a shot at a repeat in the 2002–03 season, but lost in a classic double overtime thriller against Ohio State.

=== Scoring summary ===
Scoring summary

| Quarter | Time | Drive | | | Team | Scoring information | Score | |
| Quarter | Time | Plays | Yards | TOP | Team | Scoring information | MIA | FLA |
|---|---|---|---|---|---|---|---|---|
| 1 | 10:48 | | | | FLA | Kirk Wells 23-yard touchdown reception from Rex Grossman, Jeff Chandler kick good | 0 | 7 |
| 1 | 8:46 | | | | MIA | 44-yard field goal by Todd Sievers | 3 | 7 |
| 1 | 0:50 | | | | MIA | Jeremy Shockey 8-yard touchdown reception from Ken Dorsey, Todd Sievers kick good | 10 | 7 |
| 2 | 10:44 | | | | MIA | 29-yard field goal by Todd Sievers | 13 | 7 |
| 2 | 4:21 | | | | FLA | 51-yard field goal by Jeff Chandler | 13 | 10 |
| 3 | 13:10 | | | | FLA | Earnest Graham 36-yard touchdown run, Todd Sievers kick good | 13 | 17 |
| 3 | 8:23 | | | | MIA | D.J. Williams 19-yard touchdown reception from Ken Dorsey, Todd Sievers kick good | 20 | 17 |
| 3 | 3:30 | | | | MIA | Najeh Davenport 2-yard touchdown reception from Ken Dorsey, Todd Sievers kick good | 27 | 17 |
| 4 | 12:50 | | | | FLA | 26-yard field goal by Jeff Chandler | 27 | 20 |
| 4 | 7:48 | | | | MIA | 29-yard field goal by Todd Sievers | 30 | 20 |
| 4 | 4:21 | | | | MIA | Najeh Davenport 3-yard touchdown run, Todd Sievers kick good | 37 | 20 |
| "TOP" = time of possession. For other American football terms, see Glossary of American football. | | | | | | | 37 | 20 |

=== Statistics ===
| | 1 | 2 | 3 | 4 | Total |
|---|---|---|---|---|---|
| No. 3 Hurricanes | 10 | 3 | 14 | 10 | 37 |
| No. 7 Gators | 7 | 3 | 7 | 3 | 20 |

| Statistics | MIA | FLA |
|---|---|---|
| First downs | 28 | 25 |
| Plays–yards | 84–454 | 73–452 |
| Rushes–yards | 43–184 | 20–140 |
| Passing yards | 270 | 312 |
| Passing: comp–att–int | 22–40–2 | 24–51–3 |
| Turnovers | | |
| Time of possession | 35:19 | 24:41 |

| Team | Category | Player | Statistics |
|---|---|---|---|
| Miami | Passing | Ken Dorsey | 22/40, 270 yds, 3 TD, 2 INT |
| Miami | Rushing | Clinton Portis | 18 car, 97 yds |
| Miami | Receiving | Santana Moss | 6 rec, 89 yds |
| Florida | Passing | Rex Grossman | 18/41, 252 yds, 1 TD, 2 INT |
| Florida | Rushing | Earnest Graham | 15 car, 136 yds, 1 TD |
| Florida | Receiving | Reche Caldwell | 6 rec, 110 yds |
