= Siravo =

Siravo is a surname of southern Italian origin. Notable people with the surname include:

- George Siravo (1916–2000), American composer, arranger, conductor, saxophonist, and clarinetist
- Joseph Siravo (1955–2021), American actor, producer, and educator
- Mike Siravo (born 1976), American football coach
