= 2000 Pittsburgh Panthers football team =

American college football season

2000 Pittsburgh Panthers football

Insight.com Bowl, L 29–37 vs. Iowa State
- Conference: Big East Conference
- Record: 7–5 (4–3 Big East)
- Head coach: Walt Harris (4th season)
- Offensive coordinator: J. D. Brookhart (1st season)
- Offensive scheme: West Coast
- Defensive coordinator: Paul Rhoads (1st season)
- Base defense: Multiple 4–3
- Home stadium: Three Rivers Stadium

2000 Big East Conference football standings
	Conf.			Overall
Team	W		L	W		L
No. 2 Miami (FL) $	7	–	0	11	–	1
No. 6 Virginia Tech	6	–	1	11	–	1
Pittsburgh	4	–	3	7	–	5
Syracuse	4	–	3	6	–	5
Boston College	3	–	4	7	–	5
West Virginia	3	–	4	7	–	5
Temple	1	–	6	4	–	7
Rutgers	0	–	7	3	–	8
$ – BCS representative as conference champion; Rankings from AP Poll

The 2000 Pittsburgh Panthers football team represented the University of Pittsburgh as a member of the Big East Conference during the 2000 NCAA Division I-A football season. Led by fourth-year head coach Walt Harris, the Panthers compiled an overall record of 7–5 with a mark of 4–3 in conference play, tying for third place in the Big East. Pittsburgh was invited to the Insight.com Bowl, where the Panthers lost to Iowa State. The team played home games at Three Rivers Stadium in Pittsburgh.

== Schedule ==
Date	Time	Opponent	Site	TV	Result	Attendance
September 2	3:30 p.m.	Kent State*	Three Rivers Stadium; Pittsburgh, PA		W 30–7	31,089
September 9	12:00 p.m.	at Bowling Green*	Doyt Perry Stadium; Bowling Green, OH	ESPN Plus	W 34–16	11,533
September 16	3:30 p.m.	Penn State*^{†}	Three Rivers Stadium; Pittsburgh, PA (rivalry)	CBS	W 12–0	61,211
September 23	3:30 p.m.	Rutgers	Three Rivers Stadium; Pittsburgh, PA		W 29–17	30,890
October 7	4:30 p.m.	at Syracuse	Carrier Dome; Syracuse, NY (rivalry)	ESPN2	L 17–24 ^{2OT}	40,699
October 21	12:00 p.m.	Boston College	Three Rivers Stadium; Pittsburgh, PA	ESPN Plus	W 42–26	31,567
October 28	3:30 p.m.	at No. 2 Virginia Tech	Lane Stadium; Blacksburg, VA	CBS	L 34–37	56,272
November 4	6:30 p.m.	North Carolina*	Three Rivers Stadium; Pittsburgh, PA	ESPN2	L 17–20	43,872
November 11	12:00 p.m.	at No. 2 Miami (FL)	Miami Orange Bowl; Miami, FL	ESPN2	L 7–35	47,520
November 18	12:00 p.m.	at Temple	Veterans Stadium; Philadelphia, PA	ESPN Plus	W 7–0	12,842
November 24	2:30 p.m.	West Virginia	Three Rivers Stadium; Pittsburgh, PA (Backyard Brawl)	CBS	W 38–28	46,569
December 28	7:30 p.m.	vs. Iowa State*	Bank One Ballpark; Phoenix, AZ (Insight.com Bowl)	ESPN	L 29–37	41,813
*Non-conference game; ^{†}Homecoming; Rankings from AP Poll released prior to the game; All times are in Eastern time

== Regular season ==
The previous season saw Pitt miss the post season by finishing 5–6. For 2000, Pitt looked to find a replacement at defensive back for NFL drafted Hank Poteat.

The season started out with a 30–7 win over Kent State. The Panthers then travelled to Bowling Green, winning there 34 – 16 and improving to 2-0 for the first time since 1995. Pitt then hosted Penn State for the two teams last scheduled meeting, which Pitt won 12–0. This was Pitt's first win against Penn State in 8 games and improved Pitt to 3–0, their best start since 1991. Pitt continued their winning ways with a 29–17 win over Rutgers, despite seven turnovers by the Panthers.

Pittsburgh's winning streak would come to an end at Syracuse in double overtime fashion, 17–24. Pitt would come back two weeks later with an impressive win over Boston College. BC came into the game with the second ranked passing defence in the country, but not after Pitt quarterback John Turman threw for 332 yards and five touchdown passes. Running back Kevan Barlow also contributed, running for 209 yards on 25 carries including a 45-yard touchdown run, in the 42-26 Pitt victory.

The following game required a road trip to, then ranked second in the nation, Virginia Tech. Pitt led Tech 34–27 going into the fourth quarter, due mostly to their passing attack. John Turman threw for 311 yards and 4 touchdown passes in the game. Without starting quarterback Michael Vick, Virginia Tech came back in the fourth quarter, scoring 10 points, to win the game 34–37. Pittsburgh only gained 24 yards on the ground and the defence gave up 477 yards.

Pittsburgh would then host North Carolina, who would upset the Panthers 17–20 despite holding a 407–293 disadvantage in total offense. Pittsburgh would then have to visit another top ranked team on the road with a trip to, then ranked second in the nation, Miami. Pittsburgh would have its worst offensive performance of the season, gaining only 266 yards, in the 7–35 loss. The Panthers have now lost 3 straight and their record is 5–4.

Pittsburgh clinched their first winning season since 1997 and recorded their second shutout, first time since 1987, with a 7–0 win at Temple despite 6 Panther turnovers. Wide receiver Antonio Bryant, who gained 81 yards on 6 receptions and recorded the game's only touchdown, broke the Big East record for most receiving yards in a season with 1,154 yards. Pitt would end the season 7–4, their best since 1989, with a 38–28 win over West Virginia. Pitt running back Kevan Barlow, playing in his last home game as a Panther, rushed for a career-high 272 yards and 4 touchdowns, 1,053 yards for the season. Only Tony Dorsett had rushed for more yards in a single game. Barlow also broke a record for most yards gained against a West Virginia defence.

== Insight.com Bowl ==
Pittsburgh accepted a bid to play in the Insight.com Bowl, Pittsburgh's second bowl game under Walt Harris, against Iowa State. The contest was the first football game played at the home field of Major League Baseball's Arizona Diamondbacks, Bank One Ballpark. Pitt scored on their first possession by way of a 72-yard Antonio Bryant touchdown reception from quarterback John Turman. Iowa State would then go on to score 27 unanswered points. Pitt would score twice unanswered to start the second half, a Rod Rutherford 2-yard touchdown run and an Antonio Bryant 44-yard touchdown reception. Pitt would miss the extra point to make the score 20–27.

Pittsburgh would then give up a 72-yard punt return for a touchdown by Iowa State's JaMain Billups, 20–34. Next, Pitt's Nick Lotz would kick a 25-yard field goal to make it 23–34 with 11:08 left in the game. On Iowa State's ensuing possession, they fumbled on first play at their own 29. Kevan Barlow would score from 3 yards out with 9:45 left in the game. A failed 2-point conversion made the score 29–34.

Iowa State would add a 41-yard field goal with 4:53 left, 29–37. Pitt's comeback drive would be ended by a Marc Timmons interception at Iowa State's 12-yard line. John Turman threw for a career-high 347 yards and two touchdowns, Antonio Bryant caught 5 passes for 155 yards and 2 touchdowns, and Kevan Barlow rushed for 114 yards and 1 touchdown. Ramon Walker had 15 tackles and 2 forced fumbles.

== Personnel ==
=== Coaching staff ===
2000 Pittsburgh Panthers football staff
Coaching staff: Walt Harris – Head coach; Bob Junko – Assistant head coach/defensive tackles; J.D. Brookhart – Offensive coordinator/Wide receivers; Paul Rhoads – Defensive coordinator/secondary; David Blackwell – Linebackers; Curtis Bray – Defensive ends; Kenny Carter – Running backs; Bryan Deal – Recruiting coordinator/Specialists; Tom Freeman – Offensive line/run game coordinator; Bob Ligashesky – Tight ends/special teams	Support staff: Chris LaSala – Director of football operations; Sean McGowan – Graduate assistant; Eric Sutulovich – Graduate assistant; Mauro Monz – Graduate assistant	Strength and conditioning staff: Buddy Morris – Strength and conditioning coach; Chad Hutsko – Assistant strength and conditioning coach

=== Roster ===
2000 Pittsburgh Panthers football team roster
Players
Coaches
Offense

Pos.	#	Name	Class
OL	77	Bryan Anderson	So
RB	43	Kevan Barlow	Sr
WR	80	Antonio Bryant	Jr
WR	84	R. J. English	Jr
RB	37	Nick Goings	Sr
WR	83	Latef Grim	Sr
RB	32	Lousaka Polite	Fr
QB	12	Rod Rutherford	Fr
QB	10	John Turman	Sr
TE	83	Kris Wilson	Fr

Defense

Pos.	#	Name	Class
DB	5	Torrie Cox	So
LB	51	Gerald Hayes	So
DE	57	Bryan Knight	Jr
DB	25	Ramon Walker	So

Special teams

Pos.	#	Name	Class

Head coach

- Walt Harris

Coordinators/assistant coaches

Legend

- (C) Team captain
- (S) Suspended
- (I) Ineligible
- Injured
- Redshirt

Roster
Last update: 2001-02-24

== Awards and honors ==
- Antonio Bryant, Fred Biletnikoff Award

== Team players drafted in to the NFL ==
Player	Position	Round	Pick	NFL club
Kevan Barlow	Running back	3	80	San Francisco 49ers
