= 2000 Virginia Tech Hokies football team =

American college football season

2000 Virginia Tech Hokies football

Gator Bowl champion

Gator Bowl, W 41–20 vs. Clemson
- Conference: Big East Conference

Ranking
- Coaches: No. 6
- AP: No. 6
- Record: 11–1 (6–1 Big East)
- Head coach: Frank Beamer (14th season)
- Offensive coordinator: Rickey Bustle (7th season)
- Offensive scheme: Multiple
- Defensive coordinator: Bud Foster (6th season)
- Base defense: 4–4
- Home stadium: Lane Stadium

2000 Big East Conference football standings
	Conf.			Overall
Team	W		L	W		L
No. 2 Miami (FL) $	7	–	0	11	–	1
No. 6 Virginia Tech	6	–	1	11	–	1
Pittsburgh	4	–	3	7	–	5
Syracuse	4	–	3	6	–	5
Boston College	3	–	4	7	–	5
West Virginia	3	–	4	7	–	5
Temple	1	–	6	4	–	7
Rutgers	0	–	7	3	–	8
$ – BCS representative as conference champion; Rankings from AP Poll

The 2000 Virginia Tech Hokies football team represented Virginia Tech as a member of the Big East Conference during the 2000 NCAA Division I-A football season. Led by 14th-year Frank Beamer, the Hokies compiled an overall record of 11–1, with a mark of 6–1 in conference play, placing second in the Big East. Virginia Tech was invited to the Gator Bowl, where the Hokies defeated Clemson. The team played home game at Lane Stadium in Blacksburg, Virginia.

Virginia Tech the season ranked sixth in both the AP poll and the Coaches Poll. In one longitudinal statistical measure, the 2000 team ranks as the best team in Tech history. (Note: Based on a statistical technique used by College Football Reference that uses unweighted victory margin and strength of schedule, this was the number one ranked team in school history dating back to games played in 1902. It was 19.42 points better than the average Division I team in 2000. Using this computational method, it was 4th best overall college football team in 2000.)

This was Tech's second straight 11–1 season, tying the record for wins in a season that still stands though the 2024 season. The team's only loss was to the Miami Hurricanes, in a game in which Tech star Michael Vick was only able to play sparingly due to an ankle sprain sustained two weeks earlier. Tech was ranked second in the AP poll at the time, tied for the highest standing in program history. Miami was ranked third, and went on to finish second in the AP poll.

Vick was considered a top Heisman Trophy candidate before he was injured in the first half of the ninth game of the season, against Pittsburgh. The previous year, he finished third in the Heisman voting after leading Tech to the Sugar Bowl for the BCS National Championship Game. Vick had his share of highlights before his injury: his career rushing high of 210 yards against the Boston College Eagles in Chestnut Hill, Massachusetts; racking up 288 yards of total offense and scoring two touchdowns against West Virginia in a 48–20 win; and leading the Hokies back from a 14–0 deficit against Syracuse at the Carrier Dome, cementing the victory with a 55-yard run with 1:34 left. Vick finished sixth in the Heisman voting in 2000.

The day following the regular-season finale with Virginia, Beamer visited the University of North Carolina at Chapel Hill, where he was offered the job to replace fired head football coach Carl Torbush. According to numerous reports, Beamer accepted the job, but in the end he decided to stay with his alma mater. The team was ranked fifth in the final Bowl Championship Series (BCS) ranking, but was snubbed for an at-large spot in the BCS bowls favor of the eighth and 11th ranked teams. After the season, Vick opted to forgo his final two years of college eligibility, and was selected by the Atlanta Falcons with the first overall pick of the 2001 NFL draft.

== Schedule ==
Date	Time	Opponent	Rank	Site	TV	Result	Attendance	Source
August 27	8:00 p.m.	Georgia Tech*	No. 11	Lane Stadium; Blacksburg, VA (BCA Classic)	ESPN2	Cancelled (Note: Game was postponed due to thunderstorms, and never rescheduled)	56,276	
September 2	12:00 p.m.	Akron*	No. 11	Lane Stadium; Blacksburg, VA	ESPN Plus	W 52–23	56,272	
September 7	8:00 p.m.	at East Carolina*	No. 10	Dowdy–Ficklen Stadium; Greenville, NC	ESPN	W 45–28	45,123	
September 16	12:00 p.m.	Rutgers	No. 8	Lane Stadium; Blacksburg, VA	ESPN Plus	W 49–0	56,272	
September 30	3:30 p.m.	at Boston College	No. 4	Alumni Stadium; Chestnut Hill, MA (rivalry)	CBS	W 48–34	44,500	
October 7	12:00 p.m.	Temple	No. 3	Lane Stadium; Blacksburg, VA	ESPN Plus	W 35–13	56,272	
October 12	8:00 p.m.	West Virginia	No. 3	Lane Stadium; Blacksburg, VA (rivalry)	ESPN	W 48–20	56,272	
October 21	7:00 p.m.	at Syracuse	No. 2	Carrier Dome; Syracuse, NY	ESPN	W 22–14	49,033	
October 28	3:30 p.m.	Pittsburgh	No. 2	Lane Stadium; Blacksburg, VA	CBS	W 37–34	56,272	
November 4	12:00 p.m.	at No. 3 Miami (FL)	No. 2	Miami Orange Bowl; Miami, FL (rivalry, College GameDay)	CBS	L 21–41	77,410	
November 11	6:00 p.m.	at UCF*	No. 8	Florida Citrus Bowl; Orlando, FL	ESPN GamePlan	W 44–21	50,220	
November 25	7:30 p.m.	Virginia*	No. 6	Lane Stadium; Blacksburg, VA (rivalry)	ESPN	W 42–21	56,272	
January 1, 2001	12:30 p.m.	vs. No. 16 Clemson*	No. 6	Alltel Stadium; Jacksonville, FL (Gator Bowl)	NBC	W 41–20	68,741	
*Non-conference game; Rankings from AP Poll released prior to the game; All times are in Eastern time

== Rankings ==
Ranking movements Legend: ██ Increase in ranking ██ Decrease in ranking ( ) = First-place votes
	Week																
Poll	Pre	1	2	3	4	5	6	7	8	9	10	11	12	13	14	15	Final
AP	11	11	10	8	5	4	3	3 (1)	2 (1)	2	2	8	7	6	6	6	6
Coaches	10	10	9	8	4 (1)	4	3	2 (3)	2 (1)	2	2 (4)	8	7	5	5	5	6
BCS	Not released									3	2	8	6	6	5	5	Not released

== Preseason prospects ==
Virginia Tech began the 2000 season ranked 11th in the Associated Press pre-season poll after losing in the BCS National Championship game the previous year. Tech's star quarterback Michael Vick was returning at quarterback. He had finished third in voting for the 1999 Heisman that was held before his stellar performance in the championship game. In voting that happened after the bowl game, Vick won the Best College Football Player ESPY Award. However, eight defensive starters, including Nagurski Award winner Corey Moore, had moved on from the team that lead the nation in scoring defense.

== Black Coaches Association Classic washout ==
Shortly after the 1999 National Championship game, Tech was selected to play in one of several special "preseason" games allowed at that time, enabling it to play an extra game (12 instead of 11). The game was sponsored by the Black Coaches Association, and to be held in Lane Stadium. ACC member Georgia Tech was later selected to be the opponent. ESPN decided to have a special one-hour preseason special live from Blacksburg immediately preceding the contest. It was the third time in four games that Tech was appearing on Gameday, including the National Championship, and it was the third time in Tech's last four home games that the Gameday crew would be in Blacksburg. ( See College GameDay (football TV program)#Locations). Lee Corso, former Indiana coach, had become famous for his end-of-show picks where he donned the headgear of the team he picked the to win the Gameday contest. He became a huge favorite of the Tech fans the previous year when he not only picked the Hokies to win against Syracuse and Miami when the show was in Blacksburg, but also because he had forecast what seemed like an improbable matchup between then 13th-ranked Tech and Florida State in the National Championship game during the preseason show. At the end of the show, Corso did pick the Hokies to prevail in the game that evening versus Georgia Tech, but he made two picks that were very unpopular with Virginia Tech fans. He predicted Florida State to play Kansas State in the National Championship game and for Seminole quarterback Chris Weinke to win the Heisman. Tech fans booed as word of his pick, made live from the south end zone, made its way through the crowd.

Tech added permanent seats in the North end zone that were finished only shortly before the game was to be played. A then-record 56,276 fans were on hand to see the game. Before the Hokies entered the game through the tunnel from their locker room, a brand new video scoreboard was utilized to play a segment that began with a stormy scene with a lightning strike. A new tradition would be started when the team entered the field accompanied by the Metallica song "Enter Sandman." This was the first time that entrance song was used in what has now become a staple of the Lane Stadium pre-game routine. The crowd jumping did not begin until the following year.

The lightning strike on the video board proved prophetic. As the teams were lined up for the opening kickoff (Tech's kicker Carter Worley actually had his hand in the air signaling his readiness to kick) a giant lightning bolt lit up the Blacksburg sky. Dan Blum, the referee, ran onto the field waving his hands over his head and blowing his whistle. The teams were quickly instructed to move to the locker rooms with field access at the south end of the stadium. The game was eventually canceled for the night about an hour later as the initial deluge was followed by a more serious storm that lasted until about two hours after the game was originally called. Due to involvement of an external sponsor of the game, there was serious discussion about holding the game on Friday night December 1, the night before several college conference championships were scheduled to be played. Georgia Tech said that it would not play on that date, and for a short period another team was being recruited to play in Blacksburg on that date. By the weekend of the next game, the game was off.

== Regular season summary ==
Tech breezed through its first five games, never trailing while beating Akron, East Carolina, Rutgers, Boston College and Temple. In a home rivalry game against West Virginia, the Mountaineers took the lead right before half and led for a total of 2 minutes and 8 seconds before being blown out in the second half by a 48–20 score. In those six games, Tech outscored its opponents by over 28 points per game.

Tech traveled to Syracuse in the seventh game of the year in an attempt to win its first away game against Syracuse since 1986. The Orange led 14–0 after the first quarter, and didn't relinquish the lead until late in the third quarter. Tech came back to win 22–14.

In the following game against Pittsburgh, Vick sprained his ankle in the first half and had to miss the rest of that game, won on a late field goal by Carter Warley after a drive engineered by backup quarterback Dave Meyer. Vick was unable to start against the Miami Hurricanes—the Hokies' lone loss of the season. He was ineffective in the Miami loss, and then sat out the win game against Central Florida played in Orlando. In the Commonwealth Cup, Virginia led at the end of the first quarter, before Tech came back for a three touchdown win.

Lee Suggs was the sparkplug for the Tech offense. He ran for 1,207 yards in the 11 game regular season (bowl games did not count in official NCAA statistics until 2002). He led the Football Bowl Subdivision (FBS) with 28 touchdowns, five more than the second best in the country.

Suggs was a unanimous choice for the All Big East team, and co-Offensive MVP, a title he shared with Antonio Bryant of Pittsburgh and Santana Moss of Miami. Tech also placed offensive guard Dave Kadela on the first-team offensive unit. Defensive lineman David Pugh, (who had 57 tackles, 12 tackles for loss, five sacks and an interception)and linebacker Ben Taylor (who led the team with 103 tackles and had seven tackles for loss, 1.5 sacks, and two interceptions) were first-team defense. Vick and offensive tackle Matt Lehr were on the second team offense. Chad Beasley, Ronyell Whitaker, and Cory Byrd were on the second team defense. Placekicker Carter Warley and punt/kickoff returner André Davis were second team specialists.

== Hokies miss out on BCS at-large bowl bid ==
The previous December, Tech had emerged from the complex BCS ranking formula (Note: The rankings were determined by adding: 1)the average in two human selected rankings, the writers poll (AP) and the coach's poll (USA Today/ESPN); 2) the average of seven computer polls after the lowest ranking of eight polls was dropped; 3) 1/25 of the strength of schedule rank; 4) and 1 point for each loss) as the second-ranked team and was automatically given a chance to play Florida State in the National Championship. Tech placed fifth in the BCS standings, the top-ranked team that did not win its conference, but was not selected for one of two at-large spots for which it was eligible.

In 2000, the BCS involved four bowl games, and champions from six conferences were automatically guaranteed one of the eight spots. Notre Dame was guaranteed a spot in one of the four games only if it finished ranked in the top eight. However, the only mandate for these selections were that the teams had to be among the top 12 in the BCS rankings and had to have nine regular season wins. Once the championship game participants was determined, the other three bowls selected from the remaining conference champion, with the traditional affiliations being the primary constraint. They did not have to choose the top ranked team that remained.

Miami beat Florida State in the regular season, and was ranked second in the AP (writers) poll behind Oklahoma. It ranked third in the BCS behind the Seminoles and Oklahoma in the final standings. The AP voters were not contractually bound to name the winner of the national championship game as its top team in the final poll so the Hurricanes had a legitimate argument that it could win a split national Championship with another win in its bowl game and a Florida State win in the Orange Bowl. A matchup of Miami at BCS-3 and Washington at BCS-4 was not possible because the Rose Bowl was contractually obligated to take the traditional Pac-10 versus Big Ten matchup if those two teams were still available. A rematch against Tech at BCS-5 was out. Oregon State was BC-6 and Florida BCS-7. Florida was contractually obligated to the Sugar Bowl, and that bowl eventually negotiated to have Miami play against the Gators who had won the 1997 National Championship. The two Florida-based teams had not met since 1987. This left the Fiesta Bowl with two at-large bids.

Notre Dame had not played in one of BCS-affiliated bowls since 1995, and because of its national appeal, was a heavy favorite to get one of the spots. In fact, many writers at the time actually thought the Irish were guaranteed a spot in the BCS bowls because it had finished in the top 12. In the final week, Tech athletic director Jim Weaver reportedly lobbied to have the Fiesta choose a Notre Dame versus Miami matchup and give the Sugar Bowl the choice between the Hokies and Beavers. That was not to be.

Tech was one spot ahead of Oregon State in the final BCS standings (5th and 6th) and they both had a 10–1 record. The Hokies had lost to the BCS-3 (Miami) and Oregon State to the BCS-4 (Washington) team. Tech had the 14th ranked strength of schedule and Oregon State the 42nd. Perhaps most importantly though, Blacksburg about 2,000 miles further from the Fiesta Bowl site than Corvalis, the home of Oregon State The Pac-10 commissioner was vocal the week before the final bowl selections, saying that the "(t)here is an extra burden on the Fiesta Bowl this year. I hope they feel that.". In the end, the Fiesta chose to match Notre Dame and Oregon State. Tech coach Frank Beamer speculated that "it was kind of side of the country thing," and the Orange Bowl might have picked Tech over Oregon State if the Fiesta had decided to take Miami. The drop from the top-tier to second tier bowl game meant a financial loss of $1.7 million to the Hokies.

2000 BCS final rankings and bowl placement
BCS rank	Team	Human poll rank	Computer poll rank	Strength of schedule rank (divided by 25 in formula)	Losses	Total BCS points	Bowl
1	Oklahoma	1.0	1.86	11 (0.52)	0	3.30	Orange – BCS National Championship (as Big 12 Champion and top 2 team)
2	Florida State	3.0	1.29	2 (0.08)	1	5.37	Orange – BCS National Championship (as ACC champion and top 2 team)
3	Miami (Fl)	2.0	2.57	3 (0.12)	1	5.69	Sugar Bowl (as Big East champion)
4	Washington	4.0	5.43	6 (0.24)	1	10.67	Rose Bowl (as Pac-10 champion)
5	Virginia Tech	5.50	5.14	14 (0.56)	1	12.20	No BCS Bowl (Gator)
6	Oregon State	5.50	6.50	42 (1.68)	1	14.68	Fiesta Bowl (as BCS at-large)
7	Florida	7.00	5.71	1 (0.04)	2	14.75	Sugar Bowl (as SEC champion)
8	Nebraska	8.50	7.00	18 (0.72)	2	18.22	No BCS bowl (Alamo)
9	Kansas State	10.00	10.14	29 (1.16)	3	24.30	No BCS bowl (Cotton)
10	Oregon	9.50	11.86	24 (0.96)	2	24.32	No BCS bowl (Holiday)
11	Notre Dame	10.00	12.07	25 (1.00)	2	25.07	Fiesta Bowl (as BCS At-Large)
12	Texas	12.00	9.86	84 (3.36)	2	27.22	No BCS bowl (Holiday)
13	Georgia Tech	16.00	9.86	44 (1.76)	2	29.62	No BCS bowl (Peach)
14	TCU	14.50	13.71	96 (3.60)	1	31.01	No BCS bowl (Mobile, Alabama)
15	Clemson	14.50	13.71	95 (3.80)	2	33.17	No BCS bowl (Gator)
16	Michigan	16.00	15.00	35 (1.40)	3	35.40	No BCS bowl (Florida Citrus)
Unranked in BCS	Purdue						Rose Bowl (as Big 10 champion)

BCS bowl team
No BCS bowl

== Beamer turns down offer from North Carolina ==
As early as September, Frank Beamer's name began to be mentioned as a replacement for Alabama's Mike DuBose. In the run-up to the Miami game, on November 1, the banner headline at the top of the Richmond Times Dispatch sports page said "Beamer: No interest in Tide." That day Mike DuBose announced that he would resign at the end of the season.

The other coach in the south whose job was on the line was UNC coach Carl Torbush, whose team was 5-5 going into a November 18 game with Duke with a bowl bid on the line. Tech had a bye that weekend after its victory over UCF, and had the UVA game coming up Thanksgiving weekend. During that week, head coach Frank Beamer was contacted by North Carolina athletic director Nick Baddour to talk about replacing soon-to-be fired coach Torbush. Beamer reports in his book, Let me be Frank: My Life at Virginia Tech, that he told Baddour that he would accept the job on Saturday, November 18, the day of the Tech open date, and date of the UNC-Duke game.

Beamer was still being mentioned as two finalists (along with Miami's Butch Davis) for the Alabama job on the day Beamer accepted the Carolina job. It wasn't until November 21 that word made its way to Virginia newspapers that UNC and Beamer were discussing that school's vacancy. It became clear that Beamer would be talking to Carolina after the Saturday evening Virginia game. Tech made a very public announcement that it would raise the stakes in the quest to have Beamer stay in Blacksburg, when Tech president Charles Steger announced that it would raise Beamer's salary to above the $1 million mark on the eve of the Tech-UVA game. That Saturday, Tech beat UVA 42–21, and the following morning, Beamer flew to Chapel Hill, in his words, "to work out the details." Before he left Chapel Hill on Sunday evening, Baddour tried to convince Beamer to stay overnight and make an announcement to the North Carolina media the following morning. Beamer said he had to go home to prior to the announcement. He woke up the following morning in Blacksburg, and wrote in his book that he said to himself. "This is my alma mater. This is where I want to be. And this is where we will be as long as I am coaching."

After Beamer says he had made his decision to stay, he met with Steger and Tech Executive Vice President Minnis Ridenour Monday morning where they ironed out details of the offer the Hokies had made the previous week.

== Vick leaves after sophomore season ==
October 28, 2000 was the end of an era at Virginia Tech. That was the day Michael Vick left the game against Pittsburgh at the end of the first half and re-entered the field on crutches. It was the day that the Heisman run for Vick ended. It was the day that led to a crushing loss to a week later that put an end to the 2000 team's national championship run. It was the last time Vick would wear a Tech uniform in Blacksburg.

In the end, Vick might have played his way out of the Heisman race after his statistically poor start through the first six games and abysmal performance against Syracuse. However a columnist for the New York Daily News put his odds at 2–1 to win the trophy after the Syracuse game. Lee Corso commented that "he has not played great football like a Heisman Trophy winner. But he makes great plays, jumps over six guys, runs for 86 yards, and everybody says 'woo-woo'."

There was a story on the first sports page of the October 11, 2000 Los Angeles Times, written by a Times writer, that said that Vick would almost certainly turn pro after his redshirt-sophomore season. The rumors had been whispered even in pre-season as Vick dodged the question in a Sports Illustrated interview. The story was picked up by papers across the nation, and Vick responded the next week. In an interview with an Atlanta radio station, Vick said that he was definitely returning the next season.

Vick stuck with his story, holding a press conference on December 15 where he announced his intention to return to Tech. But rumors persisted during Gator Bowl week in late December when he hinted at being tempted by the pro speculation. On January 9, word leaked out of Blacksburg that Vick was in town getting his paperwork ready for entry into the NFL draft. His announcement that he was forgoing his final two years of eligibility came two days later. San Diego had the first round pick in the NFL draft on April 21, but a trade agreement was reached with the Atlanta Falcons. Vick was selected first, the second Tech player to receive that honor after Bruce Smith in 1986. In May, he signed a six-year deal for $62 million.

== Games summaries ==
=== Akron ===
	1	2	3	4	Total
Akron Zips	3	14	0	6	23
No.11 Virginia Tech Hokies	7	28	14	3	52

Michael Vick was responsible for 288 yards and four touchdowns as the Hokies beat Akron in both teams' season opener. Vick rushed for 102 yards and two touchdowns and passed for 186 yards and two touchdowns. Tech scored 28 points in the second quarter to post a 35–17 halftime lead. Vick opened the quarter with a 63-yard touchdown run, and ended it with a 59-yard touchdown pass to Emmett Johnson. Willie Pile had an 11-yard interception return during that quarter. Lee Suggs also had a touchdown in the second, as he rushed for 90 yards and two touchdowns in his debut as starting tailback. Tech put up 549 yards of total offense, but allowed 410 yards to the Zips. 300 of the team's yards were in the first half.

Akron at Virginia Tech Box Score

=== at East Carolina ===
	1	2	3	4	Total
No. 10 Virginia Tech Hokies	17	14	7	7	45
East Carolina Pirates	0	0	14	14	28

Virginia Tech's kicking game accounted for 17 first-half points as the Hokies ran up a 31–0 lead at the break. Beamer-ball was on full display in the opening half. On ECU's first possession, Tech tackled the Pirate punter on a bumbled snap to set up a Warley 47-yard field goal. Then Wayne Ward blocked a punt that Cory Bird ran in for a 9-yard touchdown. On the next possession, Chad Beasley intercepted a David Garand pass at the East Carolina 36 that he returned to the 17. Two plays later André Kendrick put up a 14-yard touchdown run to make it 17–0. The Pirates had to punt from deep in their territory again and Tech took over just inside mid-field. Suggs hauled the ball 37 yards to the 12, and another five to the seven where Jarret Ferguson took his turn for a running TD. On the very next series, ECU moved to the 50, but André Davis put a cap on the Beamer-ball display as he returned a punt 87 yards for another score. There was still 9:15 left in the first half, as Tech managed to put up 31 in just over 20 minutes of play. Suggs led the Hokies in rushing with 122 yards including a 56-yard score in the second half. Vick converted on nine of 16 passes for 106 yards and a second half touchdown to Browning Wynn. East Carolina scored twice in the final 3:39 of the game.

Virginia Tech at East Carolina Box Score

=== Rutgers ===
	1	2	3	4	Total
Rutgers Scarlet Knights	0	0	0	0	0
No. 8 Virginia Tech Hokies	21	14	7	7	49

Michael Vick dazzled the Lane Stadium crowd and the Hokies defense pitched its first shutout of the season in a 49-0 whitewash. In an instant replay of a move that cost Vick a start the previous season, he leaped through the arms of a Rutgers defender and did a perfect somersault into the end zone. Unlike the flip in his Tech debut in the season opener against JMU in 1999, Vick landed on his back and rolled immediately to his feet. Against JMU he had landed on his feet, and fell to the ground in pain. "I promised everybody no more flips, but I guess they're just in me," Vick said. "Everything went through my head when I was in the air. Last year ... what the coaches were going to say ... and I got it when I went to the sideline. I knew how I wanted to land and I was not going to land on my feet this time." Vick passed for another touchdown, and accounted for 224 yards, 104 on the ground and 120 in the air on a 10 for 18 day. Lee Suggs had four rushing touchdowns, two in a 21-point first quarter that were bookends to Vick's 17-point touchdown pass to Emmett Johnson. Keith Burnell scored the Hokies' other touchdown in the fourth quarter. In pitching the shutout, Tech intercepted Rutgers quarterbacks four times and allowed only 54 rushing yards.

Rutgers at Virginia Tech Box Score

=== at Boston College ===
	1	2	3	4	Total
No. 4 Virginia Tech Hokies	14	21	7	6	48
Boston College Eagles	7	13	0	14	34

Michael Vick rushed for 210 yards and three touchdowns to lead Tech over Boston College. His 82-yard TD run with 11:04 left in the game was a Heisman-like highlight when he scrambled off a pass play, ducked to evade an oncoming rusher at the Tech 10, split two defenders, and jumped over another player at the 18, stiff-armed another would-be tackler at the 24 and went down the left sideline. At the Tech 38, he leaped to miss a defensive back who dove at his feet, and cut right to avoid the next diving defender. After angling all the way across the field from mid-field to the BC 10, he went head to head with BC cornerback Lenny Walls. He stutter-stepped to the left, went right turning Wall completely around when he grabbed Vick's facemask. Vick did a 360 to get out of Walls' grasp, regained his balance, and high-stepped into the end zone. Suggs was the workhorse in the running game, and he lugged the ball 22 times for 145 yards and put up two of Tech's touchdowns. Jarret Ferguson opened the scoring on the game's first drive of 80 yards that took over five minutes off clock. Boston College had a three-and-out and the Hokies' André Davis made the lead 14–0 on a 71-yard punt return for a touchdown with 7:41 left in the quarter. BC quickly tied the game at 14, before Suggs toted the ball for a 24-yard TD, Vick put up a 26-yard tally to make it 28–14. The teams traded touchdowns before the half, with Vick going for 11 yards to make the halftime score 35–21.

Virginia Tech at Boston College Box Score

=== Temple ===
	1	2	3	4	Total
Temple Owls	0	7	6	0	13
No. 3 Virginia Tech Hokies	14	7	7	7	35

Tech rolled to a 21-0 first half lead, and used a stingy defense to hold on for a 35–13 victory. Tech's Wayne Ward blocked a punt to give the Hokies their first touchdown, with Suggs carrying the ball in from seven. Suggs scored again before the end of the quarter on a 2-yard carry after Tech took over the ball at the Tulane 40. After Temple drove to the Tech 27, Ronyell Whitaker got Tech the ball back with an interception and Michael Vick threw 41-yards to Cullen Hawkins on the first play of the second quarter. Vick had two turnovers on possessions at the end of the first half and beginning of the second that let Temple back in the game. He threw a 65-yard pick-six with 1:18 left in the first half, and then fumbled the ball to the Owls at the Hokie 19 on the first offensive play of the second half, resulting in a quick score allowing the Owls to cut the lead to eight (after the extra point attempt by Temple failed). Tech added two second half touchdowns, a 5-yard run by Vick in the third quarter, and a 14-yard run by André Kendrick in the fourth. The Tech defense only allowed 116 yards of total offense, with Temple netting -15 on the ground. The Hokies had six sacks for a loss of 43 yards, and six other tackles for loss totaling 18. Eric Green had two interceptions in his first game as a starter to go with Whitaker's early pick.

Temple at Virginia Tech Box Score

=== West Virginia ===
	1	2	3	4	Total
West Virginia Mountaineers	0	7	6	0	13
No. 2 Virginia Tech Hokies	14	7	7	7	35

Tech trailed for the first time of the season when West Virginia scored with 0:58 left in the first half, and was down 14–7 at halftime. With only a minute gone in the third quarter, Vick connected with Bob Slowikowski for a 72-yard deep pass to tie the game. Then André Davis took things into his own hands. On the next three series, he scored on a 30-yard reverse to give the Hokies the lead, caught a 64-yard TD bomb from Vick on the first play of the next drive, and returned a punt 76 yards to the end zone. André Kendrick (2 yards) and Jarret Ferguson (16 yards) capped the Tech scoring to give the Hokies a 30-point lead with 3:44 left in the game. The Hokies had scored touchdowns on their first six possessions of the second half. Tech's offense rolled up 504 yards, and allowed only 248. Ronyell Whitaker intercepted two passes for the defense and had 11 tackles. Ben Taylor and Jake Housewright each had 12 tackles. Suggs led the Hokies with 83 rushing yards. Davis had 273 all-purpose yards.

West Virginia at Virginia Tech Box Score

=== at Syracuse ===
	1	2	3	4	Total
No. 2 Virginia Tech Hokies	0	3	12	7	22
Syracuse Orange	14	0	0	0	14

Syracuse scored touchdowns on its first two possessions of the game, but the Hokies' secondary caused five turnovers that gave Tech a 22-14 come-from-behind victory. Tech entered the game at Syracuse having trailed for only 2 minutes during their first seven games, but with Beamer having lost six straight games in the much-feared Carrier Dome. The Orange had a massive chip on their shoulders after suffering a 62-0 beatdown in Lane Stadium the previous year, the biggest loss suffered by an AP ranked team in the history of the poll. On Syracuse's first drive of the game, it took the ball 93 yards, highlighted by a 54-yard non-scoring pass play on 3rd and 15. The next series, it was a 78-yard scoring play on 3rd and 19 that put the Orange up 14–0. Willie Pile picked off his first of three 'Cuse passes, enabling Carter Warley to hit a 47-yard field goal mid-way through the second quarter. Syracuse had opportunities to extend the lead. It failed to take advantage of a blocked punt that it took on the Tech 29 when a 51-yard field goal attempt was short of its mark. Then it missed another field goal on the first drive of the second half, this one from 48. Tech's defense then took control. Tech's Pile intercepted his second pass at the SU 16, returning it to the five. Lee Suggs brought the Hokies within five points from there at 14–9, but the 2-point attempt failed. Defensive back Eric Green caused a fumble on a completed pass that gave Tech its next short-field possession. Jake Housewright picked up the loose ball and went to the Syracuse 21. Suggs scored his second touchdown from the one, and gave the Hokies a lead it would not relinquish. Tech's secondary continued to thwart the Orange, as Pile registered his third interception before the fourth quarter started. Vick gave the Hokies a touchdown advantage with a 55-yard run with 1:34 left and a Corey Bird interception sealed the win. It was a sub-par day for Vick. His 55-yard TD run was completely offset by eight sacks for 60 yards. He netted a total of 9 rushing yards. He was 6-11 through the air for 75 yards. Overall, Syracuse outgained Tech 328 to 240.

Virginia Tech at Syracuse Box Score

=== Pittsburgh ===
	1	2	3	4	Total
Pittsburgh Panthers	6	14	14	0	34
No. 2 Virginia Tech Hokies	7	13	7	10	37

Michael Vick sprained his ankle late in the first half, but the Hokies came back to beat the Panthers 37–34 on a 12-play 72-yard drive engineered by Dave Meyer and capped off by a 27-yard field goal by Carter Warley. Vick was hurt on a third and goal play that was followed by a 38-yard Warley field goal that knotted things at 20 at the half. Meyer started the second half, and immediately drove the team 80 yards on the team's first possession. The Tech 'D' gave up its own 80-yard drive, and then Meyer coughed up the ball on the Hokies' 29 as the Panthers took a 34–27 lead at the end of the third quarter. Tech started the fourth was a 64-yard touchdown drive culminated by Suggs' third short touchdown of the day. Warley missed on a 47-yard field goal before the final drive. Suggs led the Hokies with 164 yards on 24 carries. Jarret Ferguson scored the other touchdown for the Hokies. Tech outgained Pittsburgh 477 to 335 as the defensive put up seven sacks, including two by David Pugh.

Pittsburgh at Virginia Tech Box Score

=== at Miami (FL) ===
	1	2	3	4	Total
No. 2 Virginia Tech Hokies	0	0	0	21	21
No. 3 Miami Hurricanes	14	7	7	13	41

Miami took a 14-0 first quarter lead before Michael Vick hobbled into the game and was ineffective as the Hurricanes pounded the Hokies 41–21. Vick entered for starter Dave Meyer near the end of the first quarter and was ineffective in running 19 plays as Miami added a touchdown to its lead. Vick sat on the bench in the second half as the Hokies outscored the Hurricanes by one, but never seriously contended after scoring the first time in the fourth quarter after Miami was already up 28–0. Meyer was 13–25 with one interception and 225 yards, throwing a 69-yard TD to Emmett Johnson. Lee Suggs scored two touchdowns on 124 yards rushing. Miami scored on big chunks, with Santana Moss scoring on 80- and 42-yard passes from Ken Dorsey, and Najeh Davenport running for a 50-yard score and Jeremy Schockey scoring from 44. Ed Reed scored on a pick-six that he took at the Tech 44. The loss ended four significant streaks for the Hokies. It had won 19-straight regular season games, 14-straight Big East wins, eight straight road victories, and five straight wins against Miami.

Virginia Tech at Miami Box Score

=== vs. UCF ===
	1	2	3	4	Total
No. 8 Virginia Tech Hokies	21	9	14	0	44
UCF Golden Knights	7	0	14	0	21

Lee Suggs ran for 144 yards and five touchdowns as the Hokies rolled to a 44–21 win over UCF. The defense had six sacks and caused six turnovers as the Hokies played in Florida for the second time in two weeks. Tech relied almost entirely on its ground game, as Dave Meyer, playing for the injured Vick, threw only seven passes. He completed two of those seven, one for 55 yards to Emmett Johnson on a non-scoring play, and one for no gain. The Hokies picked up 313 yards on 61 carries against the UCF defense. Four different Hokies intercepted UCF passes - Ronyell Whitaker, Ben Taylor, David Pugh and Willie Pyle. Nathaniel Adibi had two sacks and ran a fumble back for a 36-yard touchdown. Cory Bird also had two sacks. Tech led 30–7 at the half, and pushed the margin to 30 on the first possession of the second half.

Virginia Tech at Central Florida Box Score

=== Virginia ===
	1	2	3	4	Total
No. 6 Virginia Tech Hokies	7	21	7	7	42
Virginia Cavaliers	14	0	7	0	21

Lee Suggs scored four touchdowns and Michael Vick returned to the lineup, passing for 202 yards as the Hokies racked up a 42–21 win over their in-state rivals in the Commonwealth Cup. Vick completed 16 of 23 passes, including a 23-yarder to Suggs for one of his touchdowns. Suggs also had a 30-yard run, to go with two of his signature touchdowns from close to the goal line. He had 112 total rushing yards. Virginia scored on two of its first three drives to run up a 14–7 lead with five minutes left in the first quarter. Tech then scored on four of its next five drives, including two for 80 yards and one for 64. The fourth touchdown in this span came after Ronyell Whitaker returned a punt 61 yards to the UVA 14. Tech's lead was 35–14 before Virginia got on the board again. Jarrett Ferguson scored the first Tech touchdown of the evening on a 13-yard rush. Emmett Johnson was Vick's favorite receiver, catching six balls for 71 yards.

Virginia Tech at University of Virginia Box Score

=== Clemson (Gator Bowl) ===
	1	2	3	4	Total
No. 6 Virginia Tech Hokies	14	7	13	7	41
No. 16 Clemson Tigers	0	10	3	7	20

In a balanced offensive and defensive effort, Tech took a 7-point lead on its first offensive snap of the game and never trailed in beating Clemson 41–20 in its first victory in the Gator Bowl. It was Beamer's fourth bowl win in eight tries. Michael Vick was named MVP of the game, accounting for two touchdowns and putting up 205 yards through the air. He had the first-play touchdown, a 23-yard pass to Jarrett Ferguson, and also went in from six to give Tech a 14-0 head start. Ferguson scored another touchdown on five-yard run to put the Hokies up 34–13 in the third quarter. Lee Suggs scored three touchdowns, making his Tech season record 27 for the year. All the scores were from within five yards. Tech's defense allowed star quarterback Woody Dantzler only one passing touchdown, and the Tigers could muster only two other field goals before he took a seat in the fourth quarter.

Virginia Tech vs. Clemson Box Score

== Roster ==
2000 Virginia Tech Hokies football team roster
Players
Coaches
Offense

Pos.	#	Name	Class
WR	88	André Davis	Jr
OT	57	Anthony Davis	So
C	61	Steve DeMasi	Jr
RB	27	Jarrett Ferguson	Jr
C	64	Jake Grove	So
FB	42	Cullen Hawkins	Sr
WR	18	Emmett Johnson	Jr
OT	76	Dave Kadela	Sr
TB	Sr	André Kendrick	Jr
OT	59	Anthony Lambo	Sr
G	69	Matt Lehr	Sr
G	63	Joe Marchant	Sr
QB	13	Dave Meyer	Jr
WR	82	Ron Moody	So
G	74	Luke Owens	So
G	79	Josh Redding	Sr
TE	87	Bob Slowikowski	Jr
TB	22	Lee Suggs	Sr
QB	7	Michael Vick	So
WR	19	Ernest Wilford	Fr
OT	58	Matt Wincek	Jr
TE	93	Browning Wynn	Jr

Defense

Pos.	#	Name	Class
End	83	Nathaniel Adibi	Fr
DB	24	Larry Austin	Jr
DT	66	Chad Beasley	Jr
DB	16	Cory Bird	Sr
LB	30	Tee Butler	Sr
End	28	Lama Cobb	So
End	95	Jim Davis	Fr
DB	1	Eric Green	Sr
DB	25	Billy Hardee	So
LB	41	Jake Housewright	Jr
OT	70	Kevin Lewis	Fr
DB	35	Willie Pile	So
NT	71	David Pugh	Jr
LB	14	Nick Sorensen	Sr
DB	8	Phillip Summers	Sr
LB	40	Ben Taylor	Jr
LB	34	Brian Welch	Jr
DB	2	Ronyell Whitaker	So
DB	17	Garnell Wilds	Fr
NT	54	Dan Wilkinson	Jr
LB	45	Benny Wolfe	Sr

Special teams

Pos.	#	Name	Class
P	20	Vinnie Burns	Fr
PK	97	Jon Mollerup	So
P	48	Robert Peaslee	Fr
PK	49	Carter Warley	Fr

Head coach

- Frank Beamer

Coordinators/assistant coaches

Legend

- (C) Team captain
- (S) Suspended
- (I) Ineligible
- Injured
- Redshirt

== 2000 team players selected in 2001 NFL draft ==
The following players were drafted into professional football following the season.

Player	Position	Round	Pick	Franchise
Michael Vick	Quarterback	1	1	Atlanta Falcons
Cory Bird	Defensive back	3	91	Indianapolis Colts
Matt Lehr	Center	5	137	Dallas Cowboys
