= 2000 Insight.com Bowl =

- 12th Insight.com Bowl
Pittsburgh Panthers	Iowa State Cyclones
(7–4)	(8–3)
Big East	Big 12
29	37
Head coach: Walt Harris	Head coach: Dan McCarney
	1	2	3	4	Total
Pittsburgh	7	0	13	9	29
Iowa State	7	20	0	10	37
- Date: December 28, 2000
- Season: 2000
- Stadium: Bank One Ballpark
- Location: Phoenix, Arizona
- Referee: Cooper Castleberry (WAC)
- Attendance: 41,813

United States TV coverage
- Network: ESPN
- Announcers: Steve Levy; Todd Christensen; Heather Cox

The 2000 Insight.com Bowl was the 12th edition of the Insight.com Bowl. It featured the Pittsburgh Panthers and the Iowa State Cyclones.

Pitt scored first on a 72-yard touchdown pass from John Turman to Antonio Bryant, taking an early 7–0 lead. Iowa State answered with a 23-yard pass from Sage Rosenfels to Chris Anthony, tying the game at 7, at the end of the 1st quarter.

In the second quarter, Joe Woodley scored on a 1-yard touchdown run for ISU making it 13–7. Ennis Haywood added a 3-yard touchdown run making it 20–7. Sage Rosenfels threw his second touchdown pass of the game, a 9 yarder to Chris Anthony, as Iowa State made it 27–7 at halftime.

In the third quarter, Pitt quarterback Rod Rutherford scored on a 2-yard touchdown run, making it 27–14. John Turman later threw a 44-yard touchdown pass to Antonio Bryant making it 27–20.

In the fourth quarter, Iowa State's JaMaine Billups scored on a 72-yard punt return, bringing Iowa State to 34–20. Pitt's Nick Lotz kicked a 25-yard field goal, cutting the deficit to 34–23. Kevan Barlow scored on a 3-yard touchdown run, but the 2-point conversion attempt failed, leaving the score at 34–29. Iowa State's Carl Gomez kicked a 41-yard field goal to cap the scoring at 37–29.

Sage Rosenfels and Reggie Hayward got the MVPs. This was Iowa State's first bowl victory in school history after four previous losses.

== Scoring summary ==
Scoring Play	Score
1st Quarter
PIT — John Turman 72-yard pass to Antonio Bryant (Nick Lotz kick), 6:39	PIT 7-0
ISU — Sage Rosenfels 23-yard pass to Chris Anthony (Carl Gomez kick), 10:08	TIE 7–7
2nd Quarter
ISU — Joe Woodley 1-yard run (two-point conversion failed), 1:12	ISU 13–7
ISU — Ennis Haywood 3-yard run (Carl Gomez kick), 6:57	ISU 20–7
ISU — Sage Rosenfels 9-yard pass to Chris Anthony (Carl Gomez kick), 11:37	ISU 27–7
3rd Quarter
PIT — Rod Rutherford 2-yard run (Nick Lotz kick), 6:50	ISU 27–14
PIT — John Turman 44-yard pass to Antonio Bryant (Nick Lotz kick failed), 12:55	ISU 27–20
4th Quarter
ISU — Jamaine Billups 72-yard punt return (Carl Gomez kick), 0:27	ISU 34–20
PIT — Nick Lotz 25 yard field-goal, 3:52	ISU 34–23
PIT — Kevan Barlow 3-yard run (two-point conversion failed), 5:15	ISU 34–29
ISU — Carl Gomez 41-yard field goal, 10:05	ISU 37–29
