= 2000 West Virginia Mountaineers football team =

American college football season

2000 West Virginia Mountaineers football

Music City Bowl champion

Music City Bowl, W 49–38 vs. Ole Miss
- Conference: Big East Conference
- Record: 7–5 (3–4 Big East)
- Head coach: Don Nehlen (21st season)
- Offensive coordinator: Bill Legg (1st season)
- Defensive coordinator: Steve Dunlap (9th season)
- Home stadium: Mountaineer Field

2000 Big East Conference football standings
	Conf.			Overall
Team	W		L	W		L
No. 2 Miami (FL) $	7	–	0	11	–	1
No. 6 Virginia Tech	6	–	1	11	–	1
Pittsburgh	4	–	3	7	–	5
Syracuse	4	–	3	6	–	5
Boston College	3	–	4	7	–	5
West Virginia	3	–	4	7	–	5
Temple	1	–	6	4	–	7
Rutgers	0	–	7	3	–	8
$ – BCS representative as conference champion; Rankings from AP Poll

The 2000 West Virginia Mountaineers football team represented West Virginia University as a member of the Big East Conference during the 2000 NCAA Division I-A football season. Led by Don Nehlen in his 21st and final season as head coach, the Mountaineers compiled an overall record of 7–5 with a mark of 3–4 in conference play, tying for fifth place in the Big East. West Virginia was invited to the Music City Bowl, where the Mountaineers beat Ole Miss. The team played home games at Mountaineer Field in Morgantown, West Virginia.

== Schedule ==
Date	Time	Opponent	Site	TV	Result	Attendance	Source
September 2	12:00 p.m.	Boston College	Mountaineer Field; Morgantown, WV	ESPN	W 34–14	49,786	
September 16	12:00 p.m.	Maryland*	Mountaineer Field; Morgantown, West WV (rivalry)	ESPN2	W 30–17	53,007	
September 23	3:30 p.m.	No. 12 Miami (FL)	Mountaineer Field; Morgantown, WV	CBS	L 10–47	63,735	
September 28	7:30 p.m.	at Temple	Franklin Field; Philadelphia, PA	ESPN Plus	W 29–24	25,263	
October 7	1:00 p.m.	Idaho*	Mountaineer Field; Morgantown, WV	MSN	W 28–16	41,185	
October 12	8:00 p.m.	at No. 3 Virginia Tech	Lane Stadium; Blacksburg, VA (rivalry)	ESPN	L 20–48	56,272	
October 21	12:00 p.m.	No. 20 Notre Dame*	Mountaineer Field; Morgantown, WV	CBS	L 28–42	64,424	
November 4	12:00 p.m.	Syracuse	Mountaineer Field; Morgantown, WV (rivalry)	ESPN Plus	L 27–31	51,422	
November 11	12:00 p.m.	at Rutgers	Rutgers Stadium; Piscataway, NJ	ESPN Plus	W 31–24 ^{2OT}	16,791	
November 18	12:00 p.m.	East Carolina*	Mountaineer Field; Morgantown, WV	ESPN	W 42–24	40,389	
November 24	2:30 p.m.	at Pittsburgh	Three Rivers Stadium; Pittsburgh, PA (Backyard Brawl)	CBS	L 28–38	46,569	
December 28	4:00 p.m.	vs. Ole Miss*	Adelphia Coliseum; Nashville, TN (Music City Bowl)	ESPN	W 49–38	47,119	
*Non-conference game; Rankings from AP Poll released prior to the game; All times are in Eastern time

== Roster ==
2000 West Virginia Mountaineers football team roster
Players
Coaches
Offense

Pos.	#	Name	Class
RB	22	Avon Cobourne	So
RB, LB	34	Corey McIntyre	Jr
FB	40	Wes Ours	Sr
OT	77	Lance Nimmo	So

Defense

Pos.	#	Name	Class
LB	41	Chris Edmonds	Sr
DT	87	Antwan Lake	Jr

Special teams

Pos.	#	Name	Class

Head coach

- Don Nehlen

Coordinators/assistant coaches

Legend

- (C) Team captain
- (S) Suspended
- (I) Ineligible
- Injured
- Redshirt
