= 2000 Miami Hurricanes football team =

American college football season

2000 Miami Hurricanes football

National champion (NY Times) Big East champion Sugar Bowl champion

Sugar Bowl, W 37–20 vs. Florida
- Conference: Big East Conference

Ranking
- Coaches: No. 2
- AP: No. 2
- Record: 11–1 (7–0 Big East)
- Head coach: Butch Davis (6th season)
- Offensive coordinator: Larry Coker (6th season)
- Defensive coordinator: Greg Schiano (2nd season)
- MVPs: Dan Morgan; Santana Moss
- Home stadium: Miami Orange Bowl

2000 Big East Conference football standings
	Conf.			Overall
Team	W		L	W		L
No. 2 Miami (FL) $	7	–	0	11	–	1
No. 6 Virginia Tech	6	–	1	11	–	1
Pittsburgh	4	–	3	7	–	5
Syracuse	4	–	3	6	–	5
Boston College	3	–	4	7	–	5
West Virginia	3	–	4	7	–	5
Temple	1	–	6	4	–	7
Rutgers	0	–	7	3	–	8
$ – BCS representative as conference champion; Rankings from AP Poll

The 2000 Miami Hurricanes football team represented the University of Miami as a member of the Big East Conference during the 2000 NCAA Division I-A football season. Led by Butch Davis in his sixth and final season as head coach, the Hurricanes compiled an overall record of 11–1 with a mark of 7–0 in conference play, winning the Big East title. Miami was invited to the Sugar Bowl, where the Hurricanes defeated Florida. The team played home games at the Miami Orange Bowl in Miami.

== Schedule ==
Date	Time	Opponent	Rank	Site	TV	Result	Attendance	Source
August 31	7:30 pm	McNeese State*	No. 5	Miami Orange Bowl; Miami, FL		W 61–14	48,111	
September 9	3:30 pm	at No. 15 Washington*	No. 4	Husky Stadium; Seattle, WA	ABC	L 29–34	74,157	
September 23	3:30 pm	at West Virginia	No. 12	Mountaineer Field; Morgantown, WV	CBS	W 47–10	63,735	
September 30	7:30 pm	at Rutgers	No. 10	Rutgers Stadium; Piscataway, NJ	ESPN Plus	W 64–6	23,782	
October 7	12:00 pm	No. 1 Florida State*	No. 7	Miami Orange Bowl; Miami, FL (rivalry, College GameDay)	CBS	W 27–24	80,905	
October 21	12:00 pm	at Temple	No. 4	Veterans Stadium; Philadelphia, PA	ESPN Plus	W 45–17	28,351	
October 28	6:00 pm	Louisiana Tech*	No. 4	Miami Orange Bowl; Miami, FL	ESPN Plus	W 42–31	46,617	
November 4	12:00 pm	No. 2 Virginia Tech	No. 3	Miami Orange Bowl; Miami, FL (rivalry, College GameDay)	CBS	W 41–21	77,410	
November 11	12:00 pm	Pittsburgh	No. 2	Miami Orange Bowl; Miami, FL	ESPN2	W 35–7	47,520	
November 18	6:30 pm	at Syracuse	No. 2	Carrier Dome; Syracuse, NY	ESPN	W 26–0	49,327	
November 25	3:30 pm	Boston College	No. 2	Miami Orange Bowl; Miami, FL	CBS	W 52–6	49,715	
January 2	8:00 pm	vs. No. 7 Florida*	No. 2	Louisiana Superdome; New Orleans, LA (Sugar Bowl)	ABC	W 37–20	64,407	
*Non-conference game; Rankings from AP Poll released prior to the game; All times are in Eastern time

== Rankings ==
Ranking movements Legend: ██ Increase in ranking ██ Decrease in ranking ( ) = First-place votes
	Week																
Poll	Pre	1	2	3	4	5	6	7	8	9	10	11	12	13	14	15	Final
AP	5	5	4	12	12	10	7	4	4	4	3	2	2	2	2 (6)	2 (3)	2
Coaches	6	6	4	14	14	12	8	6	5	5	3	2 (1)	2 (2)	2 (2)	2 (5)	2 (2)	2
BCS	Not released									4	5	3	2	3	3	3	Not released

== Game summaries ==
=== At Washington ===
Miami (FL) at Washington

Team	1	2	3	4	Total
No. 4 Hurricanes	3	0	19	7	29
• No. 15 Huskies	7	14	6	7	34

- Date: September 9
- Location: Husky Stadium • Seattle, Washington
- Game attendance: 74,157
- Referee: Chuck McFerrin
- TV announcers (ABC): Brad Nessler, Bob Griese, Lynn Swann

Scoring summary
1	8:19	WASH	Braxton Cleman 3-yard run (John Anderson kick)	Washington 7-0
1	2:25	MIA	Todd Sievers 27-yard field goal	Washington 7-3
2	5:19	WASH	Marques Tuiasosopo 12-yard run (John Anderson kick)	Washington 14-3
2	2:02	WASH	Jeremy Stevens 23-yard pass from Marques Tuiasosopo (John Anderson kick)	Washington 21-3
3	7:34	MIA	Reggie Wayne 21-yard pass from Ken Dorsey (two-point conversion failed)	Washington 21-9
3	6:10	WASH	Rich Alexis 50-yard run (two-point conversion failed)	Washington 27-9
3	5:23	MIA	Najeh Davenport 8-yard run (two-point conversion failed)	Washington 27-15
3	3:50	MIA	James Jackson 8-yard run (Todd Sievers kick)	Washington 27-22
4	14:30	WASH	Pat Condiff 1-yard run (John Anderson kick)	Washington 34-22
4	2:52	MIA	James Jackson 1-yard run (Todd Sievers kick)	Washington 34-29

The lowest-point of the season was the second game loss at the Washington Huskies. This was the game that ultimately cost Miami a chance to play in the BCS National championship game.

=== Florida State ===
Memorable games in the 2000 season included beating top ranked FSU for the first time since 1992 in the "Wide Right 2" game. In the game, FSU had a chance to tie the game on last second field goal. Miami CB Mike Rumph sprinted off the line untouched and came within 1 foot of blocking the kick, causing the FSU kicker to adjust and kicking the field goal "Wide Right". This was the third game in the Miami/FSU rivalry where FSU had missed a game ending field goal "Wide Right". Up to this point, this was the most important win in the Butch Davis-coached Miami U teams, proving that Miami could beat a #1 ranked team again.

=== Virginia Tech ===
Another highlight of the 2000 season was beating second-ranked Virginia Tech, led by an injured Michael Vick.

=== Vs. Florida (Sugar Bowl) ===
The 2000 Miami Hurricance finished the season by soundly beating the University of Florida Gators in the Sugar Bowl in New Orleans.

== Controversies ==
Despite beating the Number 1/2 ranked football teams during the 2000 season and losing only 1 game, the BCS computer model (which chose the two finalists for the NCAA college football season) did not select the University of Miami to play in the National Championship Game, which some fans and analysts thought was a flaw in the BCS.

During the week of the Sugar Bowl, University of Miami and University of Florida football teams engaged in an infamous street fight in New Orleans, dubbed the "Bourbon Street Brawl". Up to 25 players engaged in a street brawl on Bourbon Street with the New Orleans Police being called to break up the fight. Several University of Florida football players showed signs of the fight with bruises on their faces in PR leading up to the game. No arrests were made.

After the Sugar bowl, head coach Butch Davis accepted the head coaching position for the NFL Cleveland Browns.

With their core 2000 roster intact, including Heisman candidates Ken Dorsey and Clinton Portis, Miami would start the 2001 season ranked Number 1. The 2000 team was featured in the ESPN 30 for 30 documentaries, "U part 2," and in, "U Reloaded".

== Roster ==
2000 Miami Hurricanes football team roster
Players
Coaches
Offense

Pos.	#	Name	Class
WR	1	Daryl Jones	Jr
RB	4	Najeh Davenport	Jr
WR	5	Andre Johnson	Fr
WR	6	Santana Moss	Sr
QB	11	Ken Dorsey	So
RB	21	James Jackson	Sr
RB	28	Clinton Portis	So
G	65	Martin Bibla	Jr
C	66	Brett Romberg	So
OT	73	Joaquin Gonzalez	Jr
G	74	Sherko Haji-Rasouli	So
OT	78	Bryant McKinnie	Jr
WR	84	Andre King	Sr
WR	87	Reggie Wayne	Sr
TE	88	Jeremy Shockey	So

Defense

Pos.	#	Name	Class
CB	8	Mike Rumph	Jr
FS	20	Ed Reed	Jr
CB	22	Leonard Myers	Sr
DB	23	James Lewis	Jr
LB	44	Dan Morgan	Sr
LB	48	Chris Campbell	Jr
DE	91	Matt Walters	So
DT	92	Damione Lewis	Sr
DE	94	William Joseph	So

Special teams

Pos.	#	Name	Class
K	16	Todd Sievers	So

Head coach

- Butch Davis

Coordinators/assistant coaches

- Larry Coker (OC)
- Greg Schiano (DC)
- Chuck Pagano (ST/DB)
- Rob Chudzinski (TE)
- Mike Sullivan (GA)

Legend

- (C) Team captain
- (S) Suspended
- (I) Ineligible
- Injured
- Redshirt

Roster
