= 2000 Music City Bowl =

- 3rd Music City Bowl
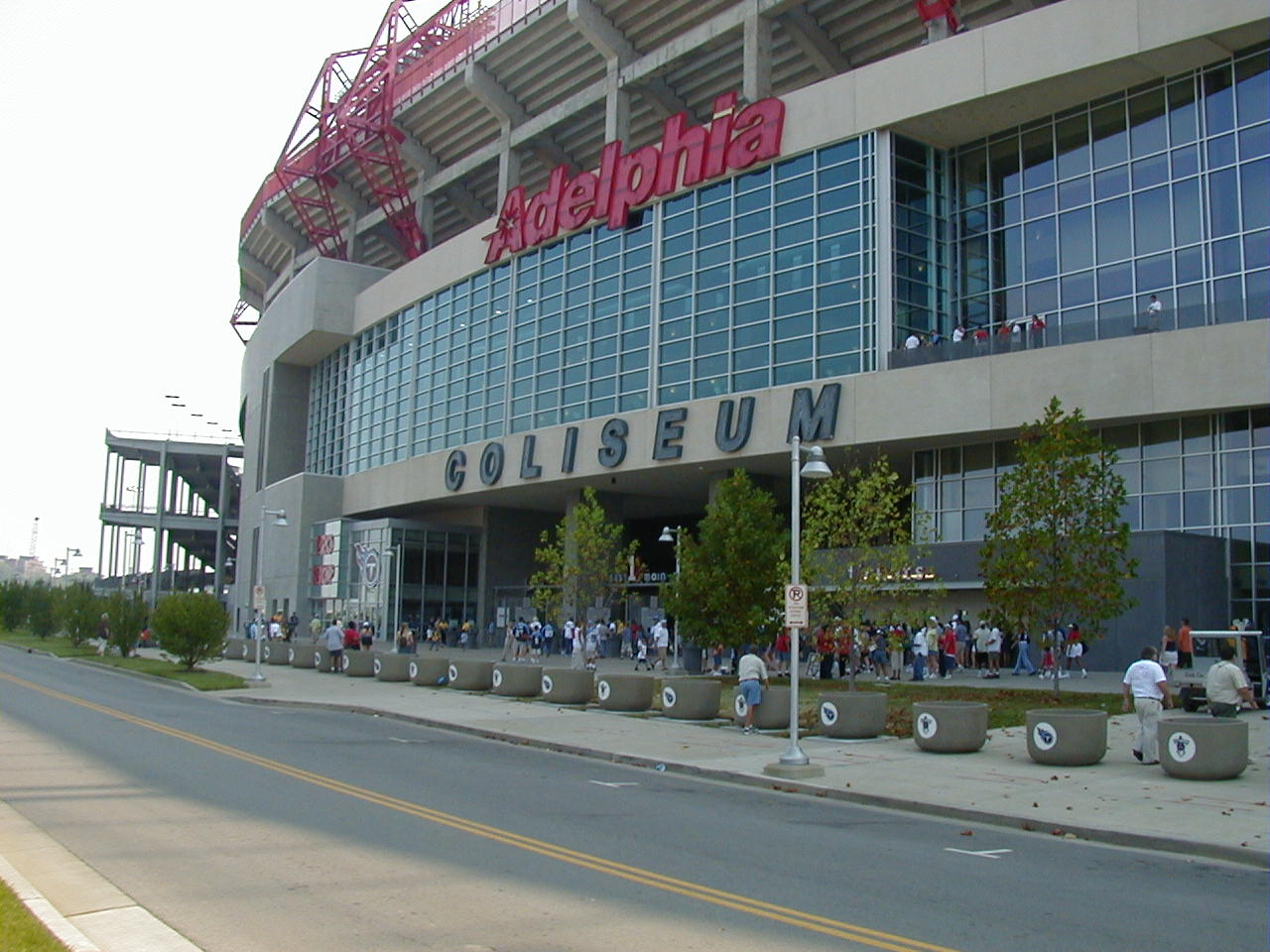
- Adelphia Coliseum in Nashville, Tennessee, hosted the Music City Bowl.
Ole Miss Rebels	West Virginia Mountaineers
(7–4)	(6–5)
SEC	Big East
38	49
Head coach: David Cutcliffe	Head coach: Don Nehlen
	1	2	3	4	Total
Ole Miss	3	6	7	22	38
West Virginia	7	28	14	0	49
- Date: December 28, 2000
- Season: 2000
- Stadium: Adelphia Coliseum (LP Field)
- Location: Nashville, Tennessee
- Referee: Courtney Mauzy (ACC)
- Attendance: 47,119
- Payout: US$750,000 per team

United States TV coverage
- Network: ESPN
- Announcers: Mark Jones, Gino Toretta, and Rob Stone

In the 2000 Music City Bowl, West Virginia defeated Ole Miss 49–38. This game was also West Virginia Mountaineers football coach Don Nehlen's final game. Although West Virginia won the game, it was notable because of a second half comeback by freshman Eli Manning. Down 49–16 in the fourth quarter, Ole Miss coach David Cutcliffe inserted Manning. Ole Miss scored 22 unanswered points in the fourth quarter. The game was played in below-freezing temperatures. The temperature at kickoff was 31 degrees, and climbed down to 27 degrees by the end of the game.
