= 2000 Boston College Eagles football team =

American college football season

2000 Boston College Eagles football

Aloha Bowl champion

Aloha Bowl, W 31–17 vs. Arizona State
- Conference: Big East Conference
- Record: 7–5 (3–4 Big East)
- Head coach: Tom O'Brien (4th season)
- Offensive coordinator: Dana Bible (2nd season)
- Offensive scheme: Pro-style
- Defensive coordinator: Frank Spaziani (2nd season)
- Base defense: 4–3
- Captains: Tim Hasselbeck; RaMon Johnson; Paul Zukauskas
- Home stadium: Alumni Stadium

2000 Big East Conference football standings
	Conf.			Overall
Team	W		L	W		L
No. 2 Miami (FL) $	7	–	0	11	–	1
No. 6 Virginia Tech	6	–	1	11	–	1
Pittsburgh	4	–	3	7	–	5
Syracuse	4	–	3	6	–	5
Boston College	3	–	4	7	–	5
West Virginia	3	–	4	7	–	5
Temple	1	–	6	4	–	7
Rutgers	0	–	7	3	–	8
$ – BCS representative as conference champion; Rankings from AP Poll

The 2000 Boston College Eagles football team represented Boston College during the 2000 NCAA Division I-A football season. Boston College was a member of the Big East Conference. The Eagles played their home games in 2000 at Alumni Stadium in Chestnut Hill, Massachusetts, which has been their home stadium since 1957.

== Schedule ==
Date	Time	Opponent	Site	TV	Result	Attendance
September 2	12:00 p.m.	at West Virginia	Mountaineer Field; Morgantown, WV	ESPN	L 14–34	49,786
September 9	12:00 p.m.	at Army*	Michie Stadium; West Point, NY	FSN	W 55–17	37,544
September 23	12:00 p.m.	Navy*	Alumni Stadium; Chestnut Hill, MA	ESPN+	W 48–7	42,681
September 30	3:30 p.m.	No. 4 Virginia Tech	Alumni Stadium; Chestnut Hill, MA (rivalry)	CBS	L 34–48	44,500
October 7	12:00 p.m.	Connecticut*	Alumni Stadium; Chestnut Hill, MA	NESN	W 55–3	35,383
October 14	12:00 p.m.	Syracuse	Alumni Stadium; Chestnut Hill, MA	ESPN+	W 20–13	44,500
October 21	12:00 p.m.	at Pittsburgh	Three Rivers Stadium; Pittsburgh, PA	ESPN+	L 26–42	31,567
October 28	12:00 p.m.	Rutgers	Alumni Stadium; Chestnut Hill, MA	ESPN+	W 42–13	33,565
November 4	12:00 p.m.	Temple	Alumni Stadium; Chestnut Hill, MA	ESPN+	W 31–3	35,333
November 11	3:30 p.m.	at No. 11 Notre Dame*	Notre Dame Stadium; Notre Dame, IN (Holy War)	NBC	L 16–28	80,232
November 25	3:30 p.m.	at No. 2 Miami (FL)	Miami Orange Bowl; Miami, FL	CBS	L 6–52	49,715
December 25	3:30 p.m.	vs. Arizona State*	Aloha Stadium; Honolulu, HI (Aloha Bowl)	ABC	W 31–17	24,397
*Non-conference game; Rankings from AP Poll released prior to the game; All times are in Eastern time

== Roster ==
2000 Boston College Eagles football team roster
Players
Coaches
Offense

Pos.	#	Name	Class
RB	1	William Green	So
QB	2	Brian St. Pierre	So
QB	7	Tim Hasselbeck	Sr
FB	39	Matt Tower	Jr
G	66	Paul Zukauskas	Sr
OT	75	Marc Colombo	Jr
TE	80	Mike Guazzo	Sr
TE	81	Josh Cervi	Jr
TE	82	Robert Ellis	Sr
WR	83	Shaun Toof	So
WR	84	Jamal Burke	So

Defense

Pos.	#	Name	Class
DB	9	Lenny Walls	Jr
LB	51	Jerome Ledbetter	So
LB	54	Scott Bradley	Jr
LB	55	Steve Martin	Sr
LB	56	Mike Gansfuss	Sr
LB	57	Mike Famighette	Jr
DE	58	Derric Rossy	So
DT	91	Robert Bennett	Fr
DE	92	Myran Hunter	Fr
DE	94	Kevin Crane	Jr
DE	95	Justin Hinds	Fr
LB	96	Ryan Burch	Sr
DE	97	Joe Tyburczy	Fr
DE	99	Sean Guthrie	Jr

Special teams

Pos.	#	Name	Class

Head coach

- Tom O'Brien

Coordinators/assistant coaches

- Mike Siravo(GA)

Legend

- (C) Team captain
- (S) Suspended
- (I) Ineligible
- Injured
- Redshirt

Roster
Last update: 2000-08-21
