= 2000 Syracuse Orangemen football team =

American college football season

2000 Syracuse Orangemen football
- Conference: Big East Conference
- Record: 6–5 (4–3 Big East)
- Head coach: Paul Pasqualoni (10th season)
- Offensive coordinator: George DeLeone (12th season)
- Defensive coordinator: Chris Rippon (2nd season)
- Captains: Morlon Greenwood; Kyle Johnson; Pat Woodcock
- Home stadium: Carrier Dome

2000 Big East Conference football standings
	Conf.			Overall
Team	W		L	W		L
No. 2 Miami (FL) $	7	–	0	11	–	1
No. 6 Virginia Tech	6	–	1	11	–	1
Pittsburgh	4	–	3	7	–	5
Syracuse	4	–	3	6	–	5
Boston College	3	–	4	7	–	5
West Virginia	3	–	4	7	–	5
Temple	1	–	6	4	–	7
Rutgers	0	–	7	3	–	8
$ – BCS representative as conference champion; Rankings from AP Poll

The 2000 Syracuse Orangemen football team represented Syracuse University as a member of the Big East Conference during the 2000 NCAA Division I-A football season. Led by tenth-year head coach Paul Pasqualoni, the Orangemen compiled an overall record of 6–5 with a mark of 3–4 in conference play, tying for third place in the Big East. The team played home games at the Carrier Dome in Syracuse, New York.

== Schedule ==
Date	Time	Opponent	Site	TV	Result	Attendance	Source
September 2	7:00 pm	Buffalo*	Carrier Dome; Syracuse, NY		W 63–7	40,634	
September 9	3:30 pm	at Cincinnati*	Nippert Stadium; Cincinnati, OH	FSN	L 10–12	17,717	
September 23	12:00 pm	at East Carolina*	Dowdy–Ficklen Stadium; Greenville, NC	ESPN2	L 17–34	33,026	
September 30	8:00 pm	BYU*	Carrier Dome; Syracuse, NY	ESPN2	W 42–14	43,090	
October 7	4:30 pm	Pittsburgh	Carrier Dome; Syracuse, NY (rivalry)	ESPN2	W 24–17 ^{2OT}	40,699	
October 14	12:00 pm	at Boston College	Alumni Stadium; Chestnut Hill, MA	ESPN Plus	L 13–20	44,500	
October 21	7:00 pm	No. 2 Virginia Tech	Carrier Dome; Syracuse, NY	ESPN	L 14–22	49,033	
November 4	12:00 pm	at West Virginia	Mountaineer Field; Morgantown, WV (rivalry)	ESPN Plus	W 31–27	51,422	
November 11	12:00 pm	at Temple	Veterans Stadium; Philadelphia, PA	ESPN Plus	W 31–12	16,132	
November 18	6:30 pm	No. 2 Miami (FL)	Carrier Dome; Syracuse, NY	ESPN	L 0–26	49,327	
November 25	12:00 pm	Rutgers	Carrier Dome; Syracuse, NY	ESPN Plus	W 49–21	35,589	
*Non-conference game; Rankings from AP Poll released prior to the game; All times are in Eastern time
