= Don Nehlen =

American football player and coach (born 1936)

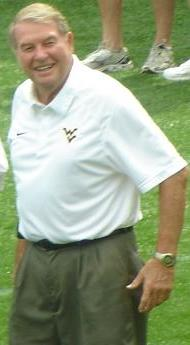

Biographical details
- Born: January 1, 1936 (age 90); Mansfield, Ohio, U.S.

Playing career
- 1955–1957: Bowling Green
- Position: Quarterback

Coaching career (HC unless noted)
- 1963: Cincinnati (assistant)
- 1967: Bowling Green (assistant)
- 1968–1976: Bowling Green
- 1977–1979: Michigan (QB)
- 1980–2000: West Virginia

Head coaching record
- Overall: 202–128–8
- Bowls: 4–9

Accomplishments and honors

Championships
- 1 Big East (1993)

Awards
- Walter Camp Coach of the Year Award (1988); Bobby Dodd Coach of the Year Award (1988); AFCA Coach of the Year (1988); Big East Coach of Year (1993); Amos Alonzo Stagg Award (2017)
- College Football Hall of Fame; Inducted in 2005 (profile)

Donald Eugene Nehlen (born January 1, 1936) is an American former college football player and coach. He was head football coach at Bowling Green State University (1968–1976) and at West Virginia University (1980–2000). Nehlen retired in 2001 with a career head coaching record of 202–128–8 and as the 17th-winningest coach in college football history. He was inducted into the College Football Hall of Fame in 2005 and has served as a president of the American Football Coaches Association.

Nehlen was a multi-sport athlete at Lincoln High School (Canton, Ohio) where he excelled in football, basketball, and baseball.

Nehlen played quarterback at Bowling Green (1955–1957) and led the team to a Mid-American Conference championship in 1956. He began his coaching career in 1958 at Mansfield Senior High School and then served as head coach at Canton South High School and Canton McKinley High School. Nehlen was later an assistant coach at the University of Cincinnati, Bowling Green, and the University of Michigan.

Since his retirement from coaching, Nehlen has been a spokesman for the coal industry. Nehlen received the 2002 Distinguished West Virginian Award from the West Virginia Broadcasters Association. In 2006, Nehlen published a book called Don Nehlen's Tales from the West Virginia Sideline, an autobiographical account recalling his 21-year tenure as the head football coach at West Virginia.

In 2017 the AFCA presented Nehlen the Amos Alonzo Stagg Award, given to the "individual, group or institution whose services have been outstanding in the advancement of the best interests of football."

== At West Virginia ==
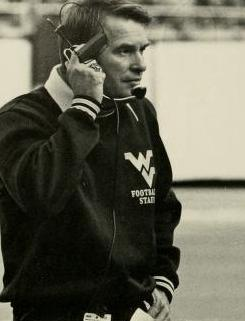
Nehlen during his tenure at WVU

Nehlen served as the quarterbacks coach at the University of Michigan under Bo Schembechler from 1977 to 1979 before taking the head coaching job at West Virginia. Nehlen became West Virginia's 29th head football coach on December 7, 1979, replacing Frank Cignetti, who had posted four straight losing seasons.

Nehlen first hired Gary Tranquill as the offensive coach. In an effort to emulate the Michigan defense, Nehlen hired Dennis Brown away from the Wolverines. Nehlen hired a number of coaches he worked with at Bowling Green. Nehlen also retained Donnie Young, Cignetti's former assistant head coach, as his recruiting coach. Tranquill left West Virginia after three seasons to become head coach at Navy, taking graduate assistant Steve Dunlap with him. Dunlap later returned to serve as West Virginia's defensive coach. One of Nehlen's most famed assistants was Doc Holliday, who served the assistant head coach and recruiting coach for almost 20 years before leaving for North Carolina State University. Holliday was sent to Florida every year to find recruits and found many talented players there, including linebacker Steve Grant. When Nehlen arrived at West Virginia, he introduced the Mountaineers' first "home and away uniforms" and a new helmet logo, "The Flying WV," which became the official logo of West Virginia athletics and, eventually, the university itself.

In 1980, Nehlen's first season at West Virginia, the Mountaineers went 6–6. In 1981, led by quarterback and future WVU athletic director Oliver Luck, West Virginia went 9–3 and upset the Florida Gators in the Peach Bowl, 26–6. In 1982, led by quarterback Jeff Hostetler (who ended up marrying Nehlen's daughter, Vicky), West Virginia started the season with an upset over the #9 Oklahoma Sooners. In 1984, Nehlen's squad posted wins against Boston College, led by eventual Heisman Trophy winner, Doug Flutie, and over Penn State for the Mountaineers' first defeat of the Nittany Lions since 1955.

The 1987 season marked the beginning of the Major Harris era at West Virginia. In Harris' sophomore season, 1988, the Mountaineers went undefeated in the regular season and faced top-ranked Notre Dame in the Fiesta Bowl. Harris was injured on the third play of the game and West Virginia lost, 34–21. Notre Dame was crowned as national champions.

In 1993, Nehlen led West Virginia to another undefeated regular season and a Big East Conference title, but the Florida Gators exacted revenge in the Sugar Bowl, winning 41–7. Nehlen's 1994 team started the season with a 1–4 record, but rebounded to qualify for the Carquest Bowl, where they lost to South Carolina, 24–21.

In 1998, West Virginia featured a number of future National Football League (NFL) players including Marc Bulger, Amos Zereoué, Anthony Becht, Gary Stills, Barrett Green, Solomon Page and John Thornton, to form a strong nucleus on a team that lacked depth on defense. The Mountaineers opened the season with a home loss to Ohio State, but finished the season with an 8–4 record, losing in the Insight Bowl to Missouri, 34–31.

Following a loss to Syracuse in 2000, Nehlen announced that the season would be his final one as head coach. On December 28, he coached his final game against Ole Miss in the Music City Bowl. After winning three of their first four bowl games, Nehlen's West Virginia teams had lost eight straight postseason contests, but his final squad, led by the offensive attack of quarterback Brad Lewis, tailback Avon Cobourne, wide receiver Antonio Brown, and fullback Wes Ours, handled the Rebels, 49–38.

Nehlen completed his tenure at West Virginia with a record of 149–93–4. His 149 victories are the most in school history. With the Mountaineers, Nehlen coached 15 first team All-Americans, 82 All-Big East Conference honorees, and 80 future NFL players. In 1988, Nehlen was recognized with three national coaching awards, the Walter Camp Coach of the Year Award, the Bobby Dodd Coach of the Year Award, and the AFCA Coach of the Year. In 1993, he was named the Big East Coach of Year. Nehlen was inducted into the College Football Hall of Fame in 2005.

== Head coaching record ==
Year	Team	Overall	Conference	Standing	Bowl/playoffs	Coaches^{#}	AP^{°}
Bowling Green Falcons (Mid-American Conference) (1966–1976)
1968	Bowling Green	6–3–1	3–2–1	T–3rd			
1969	Bowling Green	6–4	4–2	2nd			
1970	Bowling Green	2–6–1	1–4	T–5th			
1971	Bowling Green	6–4	4–1	2nd			
1972	Bowling Green	6–3–1	3–1–1	2nd			
1973	Bowling Green	7–3	2–3	T–3rd			
1974	Bowling Green	6–4–1	2–3	T–4th			
1975	Bowling Green	8–3	4–2	T–3rd			
1976	Bowling Green	6–5	4–3	T–5th			
Bowling Green:		53–35–4	27–21–2				
West Virginia Mountaineers (NCAA Division I-A independent) (1980–1990)
1980	West Virginia	6–6					
1981	West Virginia	9–3			W Peach	18	17
1982	West Virginia	9–3			L Gator	19	19
1983	West Virginia	9–3			W Hall of Fame Classic	16	16
1984	West Virginia	8–4			W Astro-Bluebonnet	18	
1985	West Virginia	7–3–1					
1986	West Virginia	4–7					
1987	West Virginia	6–6			L Sun		
1988	West Virginia	11–1			L Fiesta	5	5
1989	West Virginia	8–3–1			L Gator		21
1990	West Virginia	4–7					
West Virginia Mountaineers (Big East Conference) (1991–2000)
1991	West Virginia	6–5	3–4	NA			
1992	West Virginia	5–4–2	2–3–1	NA			
1993	West Virginia	11–1	7–0	1st	L Sugar^{†}	6	7
1994	West Virginia	7–6	4–3	T–3rd	L Carquest		
1995	West Virginia	5–6	4–3	T–4th			
1996	West Virginia	8–4	4–3	4th	L Gator		
1997	West Virginia	7–5	4–3	T–3rd	L Carquest		
1998	West Virginia	8–4	5–2	T–2nd	L Insight.com		
1999	West Virginia	4–7	3–4	T–4th			
2000	West Virginia	7–5	3–4	T–5th	W Music City		
West Virginia:		149–93–4	39–29–1				
Total:		202–128–8					
National championship Conference title Conference division title or championship game berth
^{†}Indicates Bowl Coalition bowl.; ^{#}Rankings from final Coaches Poll.; ^{°}Rankings from final AP Poll.

== See also ==
- List of college football career coaching wins leaders
- List of presidents of the American Football Coaches Association
- Legends Poll
