= 2000 Temple Owls football team =

American college football season

2000 Temple Owls football
- Conference: Big East Conference
- Record: 4–7 (1–6 Big East)
- Head coach: Bobby Wallace (3rd season)
- Offensive coordinator: Tim Stowers (1st season)
- Defensive coordinator: Raymond Monica (3rd season)
- Home stadium: Veterans Stadium; Franklin Field

2000 Big East Conference football standings
| | Conf. | | | Overall |
| Team | W | | L | W | | L |
|---|---|---|---|---|---|---|
| No. 2 Miami (FL) $ | 7 | – | 0 | 11 | – | 1 |
| No. 6 Virginia Tech | 6 | – | 1 | 11 | – | 1 |
| Pittsburgh | 4 | – | 3 | 7 | – | 5 |
| Syracuse | 4 | – | 3 | 6 | – | 5 |
| Boston College | 3 | – | 4 | 7 | – | 5 |
| West Virginia | 3 | – | 4 | 7 | – | 5 |
| Temple | 1 | – | 6 | 4 | – | 7 |
| Rutgers | 0 | – | 7 | 3 | – | 8 |
$ – BCS representative as conference champion; Rankings from AP Poll

The 2000 Temple Owls football team represented Temple University as a member of the Big East Conference during the 2000 NCAA Division I-A football season. Led by third-year head coach Bobby Wallace, the Owls compiled an overall record of 4–7 with a mark of 1–6 in conference play, placing seventh in the Big East. Temple played home games at Veterans Stadium and Franklin Field in Philadelphia.

== Schedule ==
| Date | Time | Opponent | Site | TV | Result | Attendance |
|---|---|---|---|---|---|---|
| September 2 | 7:00 pm | at Navy* | Navy–Marine Corps Memorial Stadium; Annapolis, MD | | W 17–6 | 28,335 |
| September 9 | 6:00 pm | at Maryland* | Byrd Stadium; College Park, MD | | L 10–17 | 46,950 |
| September 16 | 6:00 pm | Bowling Green* | Franklin Field; Philadelphia, PA | | W 31–14 | 15,231 |
| September 23 | 6:00 pm | Eastern Michigan* | Franklin Field; Philadelphia, PA | | W 49–40 | 13,853 |
| September 28 | 7:30 pm | West Virginia | Franklin Field; Philadelphia, PA | ESPN Plus | L 24–29 | 25,263 |
| October 7 | 12:00 pm | at No. 3 Virginia Tech | Lane Stadium; Blacksburg, VA | ESPN Plus | L 13–35 | 56,272 |
| October 14 | 6:00 pm | at Rutgers | SHI Stadium; Piscataway, NJ | | W 48–14 | 16,491 |
| October 21 | 12:00 pm | No. 4 Miami (FL) | Veterans Stadium; Philadelphia, PA | ESPN Plus | L 17–45 | 28,351 |
| November 4 | 12:00 pm | at Boston College | Alumni Stadium; Chestnut Hill, MA | ESPN Plus | L 3–31 | 35,333 |
| November 11 | 12:00 pm | Syracuse | Veterans Stadium; Philadelphia, PA | ESPN Plus | L 12–31 | 16,132 |
| November 18 | 12:00 pm | Pittsburgh | Veterans Stadium; Philadelphia, PA | ESPN Plus | L 0–7 | 12,842 |
*Non-conference game; Rankings from AP Poll released prior to the game; All times are in Eastern time

== Roster ==
2000 Temple Owls football team roster
Players
Coaches
Offense 12 Chuku, Ikey WR R-Fr. 6-3 180 Largo, Md. 34 Fenton, Makonnen RB So 71 Gabriele, Vincent OG So 60 Hilliard, Greg* C So. 6-5 279 Rumson, N.J. 58 Hoffmann, Frank OT R-Fr 30 Johnson, Kyron* FB Jr. 5-9 187 Englewood, N.J. 63 McAndrew, Frank OL Fr. 6-3 274 Bradford, Pa. 39 McClean, Alex RB Fr. 6-1 209 Baldwin, N.Y.

| Pos. | # | Name | Class |
|---|---|---|---|
| WR | 83 | Gerald Butler | Fr |
| FB | 43 | Ronlad Carthan | Fr |
| WR | 27 | Charles Cobb | So |
| WR | 3 | Mac DeVito | Jr |
| WR | 2 | Sean Dillard | So |
| TE | 98 | Tyrone Ditzel | Jr |
| QB | 10 | Mike Frost | Jr |
| QB | 15 | Collin Hannigan | Fr |
| OL | 69 | Damian Hendricks | So |
| FB | 32 | Harold Jackson | Jr |
| WR | 42 | Yazid Jackson | Fr |
| OL | 62 | Joe Johnsonbaugh | Fr |
| WR | 14 | Krishan Lewis | So |
| OL | 66 | John Maxim | Fr |
| FB | 25 | Jason McKie | Jr |
| WR | 11 | Greg Muckerson | Jr |
| OT | 78 | Mathias Nkwenti | Sr |
| TE | 40 | Chris Pitt | Jr |
| WR | 82 | Shanga Tabb | Jr |
| G | 72 | David Terry | So |
| TE | 81 | Jordan Witzel | Fr |
| OT | 70 | Jason Wright | Jr |
| OT | 79 | Dave Yovanovits | So |

Defense 21 Shepard, Philip* CB Jr. 5-10 179 Englewood, N.J. 54 Stanley, J.D. DE/LB R-Fr. 6-2 230 Nescopek, Pa. 5 Staples, Akeiff** DE/LB Jr. 6-3 236 Media, Pa. 37 Stoupakis, Manny DB So 50 Suman, Taylor** LB Jr. 6-2 227 Wyckoff, N.J.

| Pos. | # | Name | Class |
|---|---|---|---|
| DL | 93 | Anastasios Apostolidis | Fr |
| OLB | 19 | Gerard Bishop | So |
| DE | 89 | Raheem Brock | Sr |
| LB | 88 | Larry Bullard | Jr |
| CB | 22 | Donnie Coleman | Fr |
| FS | 18 | Dante Coles | Jr |
| DE, LB | 55 | Jason Davis | Jr |
| DT | 73 | Dan Klecko | So |
| DT | 74 | James Simpson | So |
| LB | 6 | LeVar Talley | Sr |
| FS | 9 | Jamal Wallace | So |

Special teams

| Pos. | # | Name | Class |
|---|---|---|---|
| LS | 52 | Kevin Czaban | Jr |
| K | 38 | Jared Davis | So |
| P | 16 | George Radu | Jr |
| P | 49 | Garvin Ringwelski | So |

Head coach

- Bobby Wallace

Coordinators/assistant coaches

Legend

- (C) Team captain
- (S) Suspended
- (I) Ineligible
- Injured
- Redshirt

Roster
