= 2000 Rutgers Scarlet Knights football team =

American college football season

2000 Rutgers Scarlet Knights football
- Conference: Big East Conference
- Record: 3–8 (0–7 Big East)
- Head coach: Terry Shea (5th season)
- Co-offensive coordinators: Jim Benedict (1st season); Bill Laveroni (1st season)
- Defensive coordinator: Dennis Creehan (3rd season)
- Home stadium: Rutgers Stadium

2000 Big East Conference football standings
	Conf.			Overall
Team	W		L	W		L
No. 2 Miami (FL) $	7	–	0	11	–	1
No. 6 Virginia Tech	6	–	1	11	–	1
Pittsburgh	4	–	3	7	–	5
Syracuse	4	–	3	6	–	5
Boston College	3	–	4	7	–	5
West Virginia	3	–	4	7	–	5
Temple	1	–	6	4	–	7
Rutgers	0	–	7	3	–	8
$ – BCS representative as conference champion; Rankings from AP Poll

The 2000 Rutgers Scarlet Knights football team represented Rutgers University in the 2000 NCAA Division I-A football season. The Scarlet Knights were led by fifth-year head coach Terry Shea and played their home games at Rutgers Stadium. They were a member of the Big East Conference. They finished the season 3–8, 0–7 in Big East play to finish in last place.

== Schedule ==
Date	Time	Opponent	Site	TV	Result	Attendance
September 2	6:00 pm	No. 14 (I-AA) Villanova*	Rutgers Stadium; Piscataway, NJ	ESPN Plus	W 34–21	23,752
September 9	6:00 pm	Buffalo*^{†}	Rutgers Stadium; Piscataway, NJ		W 59–0	26,511
September 16	12:00 pm	at No. 8 Virginia Tech	Lane Stadium; Blacksburg, VA	ESPN Plus	L 0–49	56,272
September 23	3:30 pm	at Pittsburgh	Three Rivers Stadium; Pittsburgh, PA		L 17–29	30,890
September 30	12:00 pm	No. 10 Miami (FL)	Rutgers Stadium; Piscataway, NJ	ESPN Plus	L 6–64	23,782
October 14	6:00 pm	Temple	Rutgers Stadium; Piscataway, NJ		L 14–48	16,491
October 21	12:00 pm	at Navy*	Navy–Marine Corps Memorial Stadium; Annapolis, MD		W 28–21	32,108
October 28	12:00 pm	at Boston College	Alumni Stadium; Chestnut Hill, MA	ESPN Plus	L 13–42	33,565
November 11	12:00 pm	West Virginia	Rutgers Stadium; Piscataway, NJ		L 24–31 ^{2OT}	16,791
November 18	3:30 pm	No. 18 Notre Dame*	Rutgers Stadium; Piscataway, NJ	CBS	L 17–45	40,011
November 25	12:00 pm	at Syracuse	Carrier Dome; Syracuse, NY	ESPN Plus	L 21–49	35,589
*Non-conference game; ^{†}Homecoming; Rankings from AP Poll released prior to the game; All times are in Eastern time

== Roster ==
2000 Rutgers Scarlet Knights football team roster
Players
Coaches
Offense

Pos.	#	Name	Class
QB	17	Mike McMahon	Sr

Defense

Pos.	#	Name	Class
LB	42	Brian Bender	So
DB	2	Tony Berry	Jr
LB	57	Steve Berson	So
NT	61	Thomas Petko	Sr
DL	99	Greg Pyszczymuka	So
DL	98	Marty Pyszczymuka	Fr

Special teams

Pos.	#	Name	Class
P	13	Mike Barr	So

Head coach

- Terry Shea

Coordinators/assistant coaches

Legend

- (C) Team captain
- (S) Suspended
- (I) Ineligible
- Injured
- Redshirt

Roster
