= Mauro Monz =

American football player and coach (born 1974)

Biographical details
- Born: June 19, 1974 (age 52)

Playing career
- 1992–1995: Duquesne
- Position: Defensive back

Coaching career (HC unless noted)
- 1996–1999: Robert Morris (QB/RC)
- 2000: Pittsburgh (RC)
- 2001–2002: Duquesne (OC/QB)
- 2003–2004: West Virginia Tech
- 2005: Duquesne (OC/QB)
- 2006: Akron (dir. ops.)
- 2007–2009: Akron (WR)
- 2011–2013: Youngstown State (TE)
- 2014: Carlynton HS (PA)
- 2017–2018: Baldwin HS (PA) (OC/QB)
- 2019: Mt. Lebanon HS
- 2021–2022: Albany (TE)
- 2022: Madonna HS
- 2023: Westminster (PA) (WR)
- 2024: Westminster (PA) (OC/QB)

Head coaching record
- Overall: 5–17 (college); 0–3 (high school)

Mauro Monz (born June 19, 1974) is an American college football coach and former player. He served as the head football coach a West Virginia University Institute of Technology in Montgomery, West Virginia from 2003 to 2004, compiling a record of 5–17.

== Head coaching record ==
=== College ===
Year	Team	Overall	Conference	Standing	Bowl/playoffs
West Virginia Tech Golden Bears (West Virginia Intercollegiate Athletic Conference) (2003–2004)
2003	West Virginia Tech	3–8	2–5	T–7th	
2004	West Virginia Tech	2–9	2–5	T–6th	
West Virginia Tech:		5–17	4–10		
Total:		5–17			
