= Mike Siravo =

American football coach (born 1976)

Minnesota Vikings
- Title: Senior defensive assistant/Inside linebackers coach

Personal information
- Born: March 9, 1976 (age 50); Pawtucket, Rhode Island, U.S.
- Listed height: 6 ft 0 in (1.83 m)
- Listed weight: 213 lb (97 kg)

Career information
- Position: Linebacker
- College: Boston College

Career history
- Boston College (1998–2000) Graduate assistant; Columbia (2003–2005) Linebackers coach; Temple (2006) Linebackers coach & recruiting coordinator; Boston College (2007–2012) Defensive backs coach & recruiting coordinator; Temple (2013–2015) Linebackers coach; Temple (2016) Defensive run game coordinator, linebackers coach & recruiting coordinator; Baylor (2017–2018) Linebackers coach & recruiting coordinator; Baylor (2019) Linebackers coach & special teams coordinator; Carolina Panthers (2020–2022) Defensive run game coordinator/linebackers coach; Minnesota Vikings (2023–present); Inside linebackers coach (2023-2025); Senior defensive assistant/Inside linebackers coach (2026-present)

Mike Siravo (born March 9, 1976) is an American football coach. He currently is the Senior defensive assistant/inside linebackers coach for the Minnesota Vikings of the National Football League (NFL). He previously served as the defensive run game coordinator and linebackers coach for the Carolina Panthers.

== Playing career ==
A walk-on at Boston College, Siravo earned a scholarship and lettered two years at linebacker under head coaches Dan Henning and Tom O'Brien for the Eagles. In his senior season, he earned Academic All-Big East honors.

== Coaching career ==
=== Boston College ===
Siravo began his coaching career as a graduate assistant at Boston College from 1998 to 2000.

=== Colombia ===
Between 2003 and 2005, Siravo was the linebackers coach at Columbia University.

=== Temple ===
For the 2006 season, Siravo was the recruiting coordinator for the Owls.

=== Boston College (second time) ===
Siravo returned to his alma mater, and served as the Eagles’ defensive backs coach and recruiting coordinator between 2007 and 2012.

=== Temple (second time) ===
Between 2013 and 2015 Siravo was the linebackers coach for the Owls. In 2016 he was promoted and added the titles of defensive run coordinator and recruiting coordinator.

=== Baylor ===
Siravo followed Matt Rhule to Baylor in 2017. For the next two years he served as the team's Linebackers Coach and Recruiting Coordinator. In 2019 he traded in the title of recruiting coordinator for special teams coordinator.

=== Panthers ===
In 2020, Siravo followed Rhule and was hired by the Carolina Panthers as their linebackers coach.

=== Minnesota Vikings ===
Siravo was hired on February 24, 2023 by the Minnesota Vikings as their inside linebackers coach, shortly after the hiring of Brian Flores as Defensive Coordinator.

== Personal life ==
Mike and his wife, Alison, are the parents of three children.
