= Ken Dorsey =

American football player and coach (born 1981)

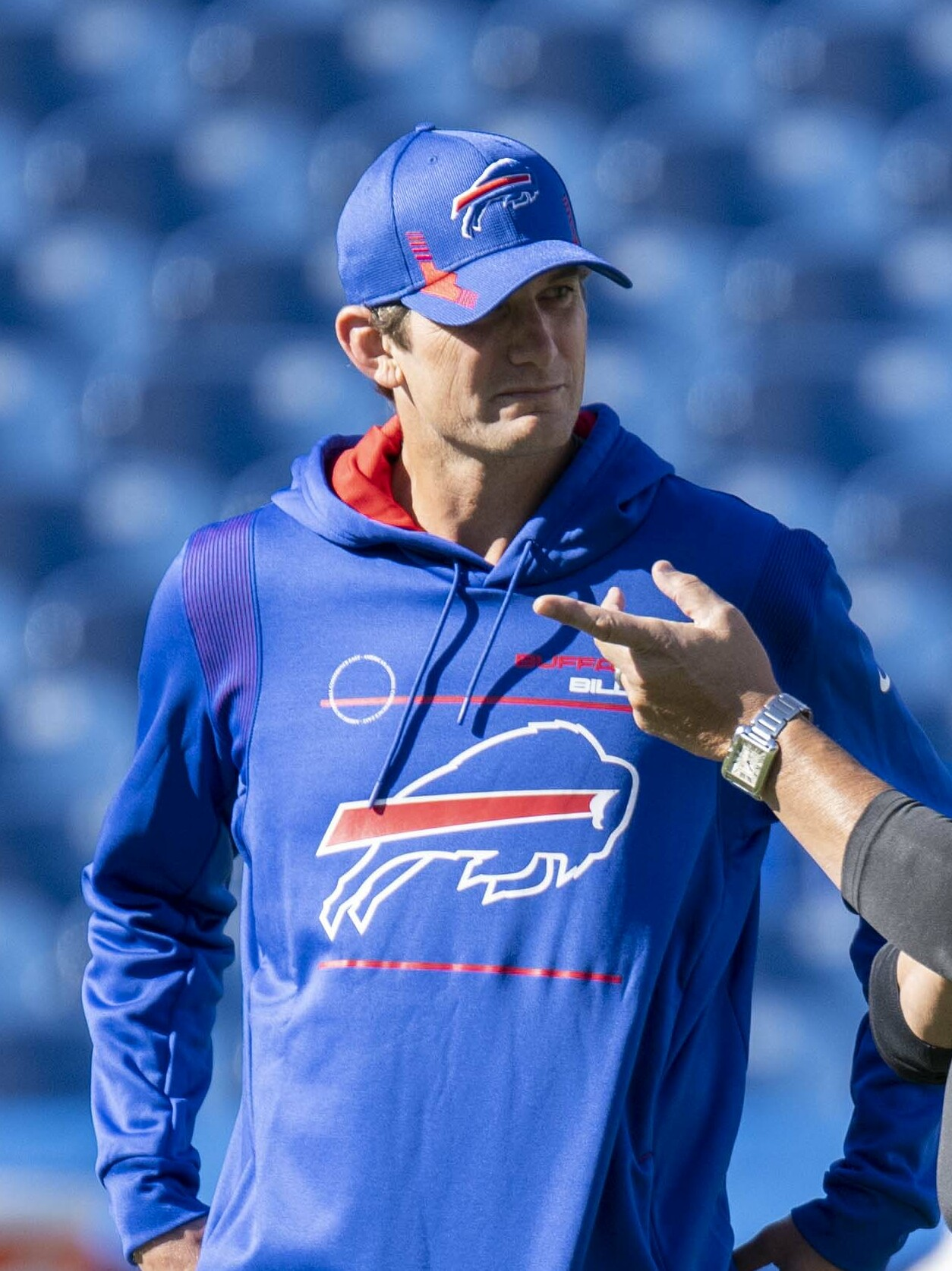
- Dorsey with the Buffalo Bills in 2021

Dallas Cowboys
- Title: Passing game specialist

Personal information
- Born: April 22, 1981 (age 45); Orinda, California, U.S.
- Listed height: 6 ft 4 in (1.93 m)
- Listed weight: 215 lb (98 kg)

Career information
- Position: Quarterback (No. 7, 11)
- High school: Miramonte (Orinda)
- College: Miami (FL) (1999–2002)
- NFL draft: 2003: 7th round, 241st overall pick

Career history

Playing
- San Francisco 49ers (2003–2005); Cleveland Browns (2006–2008); Toronto Argonauts (2010)

Coaching
- Carolina Panthers (2013–2017) Quarterbacks coach; Buffalo Bills (2019–2020) Quarterbacks coach; Buffalo Bills (2021) Passing game coordinator & quarterbacks coach; Buffalo Bills (2022–2023) Offensive coordinator; Cleveland Browns (2024) Offensive coordinator; Dallas Cowboys (2025–present) Passing game specialist

Operations
- Carolina Panthers (2011–2012) Pro scout; FIU (2018) Assistant athletic director

Awards and highlights
- As a player: BCS national champion (2001); Maxwell Award (2001); 2× Archie Griffin Award (2001, 2002); 2× Quarterback of the Year (2001, 2002); 2× Chic Harley Award (2001, 2002); First-team All-American (2002); Second-team All-American (2001); 2× Big East Offensive Player of the Year (2001, 2002)

Career NFL statistics
- Passing attempts: 408
- Passing completions: 214
- Completion percentage: 52.5%
- TD–INT: 8–18
- Passing yards: 2,082
- Passer rating: 55.2
- Stats at Pro Football Reference
- Coaching profile at Pro Football Reference

Kenneth Simon Dorsey (born April 22, 1981) is an American professional football coach and former quarterback who is the passing game specialist for the Dallas Cowboys of the National Football League (NFL). He played college football for the Miami Hurricanes, where he won the national championship and the Maxwell Award in 2001. He was selected by the San Francisco 49ers in the seventh round of the 2003 NFL draft, later playing for the Cleveland Browns and the Toronto Argonauts of the Canadian Football League (CFL), before retiring in 2010.

Dorsey became a coach in 2013, serving as the quarterbacks coach for the Carolina Panthers, after serving as a pro scout for the team from 2011 to 2012. He later became a coach with the Buffalo Bills, serving as their quarterbacks coach and eventually offensive coordinator. In 2024, Dorsey was hired as offensive coordinator for the Cleveland Browns. On February 10, 2025, the Dallas Cowboys hired Dorsey as passing game specialist.

== Early life ==
Dorsey attended Miramonte High School in Orinda, California, and was a letterman in football and basketball. In football, he was a USA Today Honorable Mention All-USA selection. In basketball, he was a two-year letterman and as a senior, averaged 10.0 points, 8 rebounds, and 5 steals per game.

== Playing career ==
=== College ===
Although not highly touted when he came out of high school, Dorsey would become the winningest quarterback in University of Miami history. He posted a record of 38–2 as the team's starting quarterback, including a 34-game winning streak. Dorsey rewrote the school record book, setting career records for total offense (9,486 yards), passing yards (9,565), passing touchdowns (86), pass completions (668), pass attempts (1,153), victories as a starting quarterback (38), winning percentage by a starting quarterback (.974), 200-yard passing performances (31), consecutive passes without an interception (193), consecutive games with a touchdown pass (31), and touchdown passes in a game (5). He led the Hurricanes to back to back BCS National Championship game appearances, winning the 2002 Rose Bowl, and appearing in the 2003 Fiesta Bowl.

In 2001 Dorsey led the Hurricanes to an undefeated 12–0 season and was named the co-MVP of the 2002 Rose Bowl (in which Miami defeated the University of Nebraska) to win the 2001 BCS National Championship. His 2001 Miami team has been considered one of the best and most talented college football teams of all time.

Dorsey was named Offensive Player of the Year twice (2001, 2002), and First-team All-Big East three times (2000, 2001, 2002). Dorsey was also a finalist for the Heisman Trophy in both 2001 and 2002 and the winner of the 2001 Maxwell Award, which is given to the national collegiate player of the year.

In 2002, Dorsey was once again a finalist for the Heisman Trophy and led the ‘Canes to a second consecutive undefeated regular season and a national championship game berth in the 2003 Fiesta Bowl. However, Miami would fall to the Ohio State University Buckeyes in double overtime. In that game Dorsey passed for 296 yards, 2 touchdowns, and 2 interceptions. Miami finished the season 12–1, ranking second behind the Buckeyes. Dorsey finished the season with 3,369 passing yards, 28 touchdowns, and 12 interceptions.

Dorsey was inducted into the University of Miami Sports Hall of Fame at its 45th Annual Induction Banquet on Thursday, April 11, 2013, at Jungle Island in Miami.

==== College statistics ====
Season	Team	Games			Passing								Rushing			
Season	Team	GP	GS	Record	Cmp	Att	Pct	Yds	Avg	TD	Int	Rate	Att	Yds	Avg	TD
1999	Miami	6	3	3–0	74	120	61.7	807	6.7	10	2	142.3	8	-20	-2.5	1
2000	Miami	11	11	10–1	188	322	58.4	2,737	8.5	25	7	152.3	16	-23	-1.4	1
2001	Miami	11	11	11–0	184	318	57.9	2,652	8.3	23	9	146.1	12	3	0.3	0
2002	Miami	13	13	12–1	222	393	56.5	3,369	8.6	28	12	145.9	23	-39	-1.7	0
Totals		41	38	36–2	668	1,153	57.9	9,565	8.3	86	28	147.4	59	-79	-1.3	2

=== Professional ===
Pre-draft measurables
Height	Weight	Arm length	Hand span
6 ft 4 5/8 in (1.95 m)	208 lb (94 kg)	31 1/2 in (0.80 m)	9 3/4 in (0.25 m)
All values from NFL Combine

==== San Francisco 49ers ====
Despite a strong college career, Dorsey was selected in the seventh round with the 241st overall pick of the 2003 NFL draft by the San Francisco 49ers, due in part to concerns over Dorsey's arm strength. In his first two seasons in the NFL, he played in nine games (starting in seven), completing 171 of his 316 pass attempts, and throwing for 1,712 yards and eight touchdowns with eleven interceptions. He started the 2005 season as the third quarterback behind Tim Rattay and #1 pick Alex Smith, moving into the backup role after the trade of Rattay to the Tampa Bay Buccaneers. He went on to start three games for the injured Alex Smith. In a Week 11 game against the Seattle Seahawks, Dorsey led an inspired comeback and was a two-point conversion away from sending the game into overtime.

==== Cleveland Browns ====
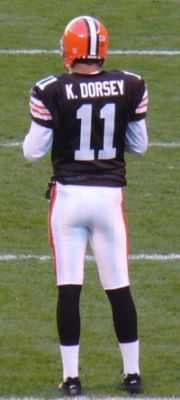
Dorsey during his tenure with the Cleveland Browns

In May 2006, Dorsey was traded to the Cleveland Browns along with a seventh round pick in the 2007 NFL draft for veteran quarterback Trent Dilfer, after having just re-signed with the 49ers. During training camp, Dorsey and Derek Anderson competed for the 2nd string position behind starter Charlie Frye. In the battle which ended in a virtual tie, Dorsey went on to serve as the third-string quarterback behind Anderson for all of the 2006 season. Dorsey was named the starter for the week 17 game against the Houston Texans but the previously injured Charlie Frye replaced him just minutes before the game. The Browns went on to lose to the Texans as Frye threw an interception and no touchdown passes.

The Browns drafted quarterback Brady Quinn of the University of Notre Dame with the 22nd overall pick in the 2007 NFL draft. Frye, Anderson, Quinn, and Dorsey competed for position on the Browns' quarterback depth chart throughout the 2007 NFL Pre-season. On September 1, 2007, the Browns released Dorsey. After a disappointing loss to Pittsburgh in Week 1, Frye was traded to Seattle and Dorsey was re-signed by the Browns in a reserve role. Derek Anderson had a break-through season in 2007, further diminishing the chances of Dorsey receiving playing time.

On November 30, 2008, Dorsey was sent into the game against the Indianapolis Colts after Derek Anderson was injured; he threw three passes, two incomplete, the other an interception.

On December 2, Derek Anderson was put on injured reserve ending his season. Dorsey was named the starter for the remainder of the 2008 season. However, Dorsey was injured during the December 21 game that was against the Bengals. Fourth string quarterback Bruce Gradkowski started in place of Dorsey in week 17 against the Pittsburgh Steelers.

Dorsey was released by the Browns on February 9, 2009.

==== Toronto Argonauts ====
On May 26, 2010, Dorsey signed with the Toronto Argonauts of the Canadian Football League, where he backed up former Miami Dolphins quarterback Cleo Lemon. On May 3, 2011, Dorsey announced his retirement from professional football.

== Coaching career ==
=== High school ===
For a brief time, Dorsey was the quarterbacks coach for the Lakewood Ranch Mustangs high school football team in Lakewood Ranch, Florida. On April 26, 2011, he was named offensive coordinator at nearby Riverview High School (Sarasota, Florida).

=== Carolina Panthers ===
On August 15, 2011, Dorsey was hired by the Carolina Panthers as a pro scout. During the 2011 off season, Dorsey was an IMG employee. On January 23, 2013, Dorsey transitioned to the Panthers' coaching staff and was hired as their quarterbacks coach under head coach Ron Rivera. In the 2015 season, Dorsey and the Panthers reached Super Bowl 50 on February 7, 2016. The Panthers fell to the Denver Broncos by a score of 24–10. On January 9, 2018, Dorsey, alongside offensive coordinator Mike Shula, was fired by the Panthers, after spending five seasons with the team.

=== Florida International University ===
On March 26, 2018, Dorsey was hired to serve as the assistant director of athletics for the sports program at Florida International University effective April 2018. Former Carolina Panthers quarterback Cam Newton was quoted as saying "He'll bring a newness and spark to FIU. Not only is he a hard worker, but he has a vibrant killer instinct. He's a known proven winner over the years."

=== Buffalo Bills ===
On February 2, 2019, Dorsey was hired by the Buffalo Bills as their quarterbacks coach under head coach Sean McDermott. Prior to accepting the quarterback coach position with the Bills, Dorsey initially accepted an offensive assistant position with Appalachian State University under new head coach Eliah Drinkwitz.

Following the 2020 season, Dorsey reportedly was approached by multiple NFL teams including the Seattle Seahawks and the Detroit Lions regarding their vacant offensive coordinator positions. The Bills promoted Dorsey to passing game coordinator and quarterbacks coach in 2021.

On February 1, 2022, Dorsey was promoted to offensive coordinator, replacing Brian Daboll, who left to become the head coach of the New York Giants.

After Dorsey and the Bills won the first two games of the 2022 season in dominating fashion, he received national attention for an incident following the Bills' last-second loss to the rival Miami Dolphins in week 3. At the end of the game, Dorsey was caught on-camera reacting emotionally in the coaches' box, slamming his hat, headset, and Microsoft Surface tablet on the table before the telecast cut away. Dorsey's reaction received a polarized response from fans, players, and analysts. The Bills ultimately finished the 2022 season second in points scored and yardage in Dorsey's first year as offensive coordinator.

On November 14, 2023, Dorsey was fired by the Bills after a 5–5 start to the season, including a slump that saw the Bills lose 4 of 6 games while struggling on offense. He was succeeded by quarterbacks coach Joe Brady.

=== Cleveland Browns ===
On February 5, 2024, the Browns hired Dorsey to be the offensive coordinator under head coach Kevin Stefanski. After a season where the Browns offense regressed significantly, Dorsey was fired on January 5, 2025.

=== Dallas Cowboys ===
On February 10, 2025, the Dallas Cowboys hired Dorsey to serve as their offensive pass game specialist under new head coach Brian Schottenheimer.
