= Garnell Wilds =

American football player (born 1981)

No. 38
- Position: Cornerback

Personal information
- Born: June 8, 1981 (age 45); Tampa, Florida, U.S.
- Listed height: 5 ft 11 in (1.80 m)
- Listed weight: 196 lb (89 kg)

Career information
- High school: Hillsborough (Tampa)
- College: Virginia Tech
- NFL draft: 2004: undrafted

Career history
- Washington Redskins (2004); Carolina Panthers (2005–2006)

Career NFL statistics
- Games played: 5
- Stats at Pro Football Reference

Garnell Wayman Wilds (born June 8, 1981) is an American former professional football player who was a cornerback in the National Football League (NFL) for the Washington Redskins and Carolina Panthers. He played college football for the Virginia Tech Hokies.

== Early life ==
Wilds was born in Tampa, Florida and attended Hillsborough High School, where he played football.

== College career ==
After graduating high school, Wilds attended Virginia Tech. During his freshman season, he tore his ACL in left knee. During his junior season in 2004, he led the Big East Conference with five interceptions.

Wilds started the first six games of his senior season, during which he had one interception and 31 tackles. However, his season ended early when he tore cartilage in his left knee before the game against West Virginia University.

== Professional career ==
Coming off a knee injury, Wilds went undrafted during the 2004 NFL draft. He talked to both the Kansas City Chiefs and Indianapolis Colts, before ultimately signing with the Washington Redskins.
