= 2001 Miami Hurricanes football team =

American college football season

2001 Miami Hurricanes football

Consensus national champion; Big East champion; Rose Bowl champion

Rose Bowl (BCS NCG), W 37–14 vs. Nebraska
- Conference: Big East Conference

Ranking
- Coaches: No. 1
- AP: No. 1
- Record: 12–0 (7–0 Big East)
- Head coach: Larry Coker (1st season)
- Offensive coordinator: Rob Chudzinski (1st season)
- Offensive scheme: Pro-style
- Defensive coordinator: Randy Shannon (1st season)
- Base defense: 4–3 Cover 2
- Home stadium: Miami Orange Bowl

2001 Big East Conference football standings
	Conf.			Overall
Team	W		L	W		L
No. 1 Miami (FL) $#	7	–	0	12	–	0
No. 14 Syracuse	6	–	1	10	–	3
No. 18 Virginia Tech	4	–	3	8	–	4
No. 21 Boston College	4	–	3	8	–	4
Pittsburgh	4	–	3	7	–	5
Temple	2	–	5	4	–	7
West Virginia	1	–	6	3	–	8
Rutgers	0	–	7	2	–	9
# – BCS National Champion; $ – BCS representative as conference champion; Rankings from AP Poll

The 2001 Miami Hurricanes football team represented the University of Miami during the 2001 NCAA Division I-A football season. It was the Miami Hurricanes' 76th season of football and 11th as a member of the Big East Conference. The Hurricanes were led by first-year head coach Larry Coker and played their home games at the Orange Bowl. They finished the season 12–0 overall and 7–0 in the Big East to finish as conference champion. They were invited to the Rose Bowl, which served as the BCS National Championship Game, and defeated Nebraska, 37–14, to win the school's fifth national championship.

2001 Hurricanes produced a record 38 NFL draft picks, and are considered to be one of the greatest college football teams.

== Schedule ==
Date	Time	Opponent	Rank	Site	TV	Result	Attendance
September 1	8:00 pm	at Penn State*	No. 2	Beaver Stadium; University Park, PA	ABC	W 33–7	109,313
September 8	4:00 pm	Rutgers	No. 1	Miami Orange Bowl; Miami, FL	ESPN+	W 61–0	39,804
September 27	7:30 pm	at Pittsburgh	No. 1	Heinz Field; Pittsburgh, PA	ESPN	W 43–21	57,224
October 6	12:00 pm	Troy State*	No. 1	Miami Orange Bowl; Miami, FL	ESPN+	W 38–7	36,617
October 13	12:00 pm	at No. 14 Florida State*	No. 2	Doak Campbell Stadium; Tallahassee, FL (rivalry / College GameDay)	ABC	W 49–27	82,836
October 25	7:00 pm	West Virginia	No. 1	Miami Orange Bowl; Miami, FL	ESPN2	W 45–3	44,411
November 3	12:00 pm	Temple	No. 1	Miami Orange Bowl; Miami, FL	ESPN+	W 38–0	31,128
November 10	12:00 pm	at Boston College	No. 1	Alumni Stadium; Chestnut Hill, MA	ABC	W 18–7	44,500
November 17	3:30 pm	No. 14 Syracuse	No. 1	Miami Orange Bowl; Miami, FL (College GameDay)	ABC	W 59–0	52,896
November 24	8:00 pm	No. 12 Washington*	No. 1	Miami Orange Bowl; Miami, FL	ABC	W 65–7	78,114
December 1	1:00 pm	at No. 14 Virginia Tech	No. 1	Lane Stadium; Blacksburg, VA (rivalry)	ABC	W 26–24	53,662
January 3, 2002	8:15 pm	vs. No. 4 Nebraska*	No. 1	Rose Bowl; Pasadena, CA (Rose Bowl (BCS NCG) / rivalry)	ABC	W 37–14	93,781
*Non-conference game; Rankings from AP Poll released prior to the game; All times are in Eastern time

== Rankings ==
Ranking movements Legend: ██ Increase in ranking ██ Decrease in ranking ( ) = First-place votes
	Week																
Poll	Pre	1	2	3	4	5	6	7	8	9	10	11	12	13	14	15	Final
AP	2 (33)	2 (33)	1 (37)	1 (40)	1 (39)	1 (34)	2 (23)	1 (48)	1 (47)	1 (55)	1 (55)	1 (44)	1 (52)	1 (71)	1 (72)	1 (72)	1 (72)
Coaches Poll	2 (15)	2 (16)	2 (22)	1 (29)	1 (34)	1 (35)	1 (25)	1 (48)	1 (47)	1 (46)	1 (41)	2 (28)	1 (33)	1 (59)	1 (59)	1 (60)	1 (60)
BCS	Not released								4	3	2	2	2	1	1	1	Not released

== Game summaries ==
=== At Penn State ===
Miami (FL) at Penn State

Team	1	2	3	4	Total
• No. 2 Hurricanes	13	17	0	3	33
Nittany Lions	0	0	0	7	7

- Date: September 1
- Location: Beaver Stadium, University Park, PA
- Game start: 8:00 EDT
- Game attendance: 109,313
- TV announcers (ABC): Brad Nessler, Bob Griese, Lynn Swann

Scoring summary
1	9:30	MIA	Sievers 35 yard field goal	MIA 3–0
1	7:23	MIA	Sands 27 yard pass from Dorsey (Sievers kick)	MIA 10–0
1	3:01	MIA	Sievers 42 yard field goal	MIA 13–0
2	13:39	MIA	Sievers 31 yard field goal	MIA 16–0
2	11:11	MIA	Davenport 28 yard pass from Dorsey (Sievers kick)	MIA 23–0
2	1:48	MIA	Shockey 10 yard pass from Dorsey (Sievers kick)	MIA 30–0
4	12:22	MIA	Sievers 23 yard field goal	MIA 33–0
4	9:51	PEN	B. Johnson 44 yard pass from Mills (Kimball kick)	MIA 33–7

The Hurricanes began the season with a nationally televised primetime win over Penn State in Beaver Stadium. With a 30-0 halftime Miami lead, Coker pulled his starters and Miami cruised in the second half to a 33–7 victory. The 26-point margin tied for Penn State's worst home loss under Joe Paterno.

=== Rutgers ===
Miami followed up the victory with wins over Rutgers, Pitt, and Troy State.

=== At Florida State ===
Miami (FL) at Florida State

Team	1	2	3	4	Total
• No. 2 Hurricanes	14	7	28	0	49
No. 13 Seminoles	0	13	7	7	27

- Date: October 13
- Location: Doak Campbell Stadium, Tallahassee, FL
- Game start: 12:00 EDT
- Game attendance: 82,836
- TV announcers (ABC): Brad Nessler, Bob Griese, Lynn Swann

Scoring summary
1	8:48	MIA	Fitzgerald 5-yard blocked punt return (Sievers kick)	MIA 7–0
1	7:16	MIA	Andre Johnson 27-yard pass from Ken Dorsey (Sievers kick)	MIA 14–0
2	11:03	MIA	Jeremy Shockey 1-yard pass from Dorsey (Sievers kick)	MIA 21–0
2	6:50	FSU	Jones 6-yard run (kick failed)	MIA 21–6
2	0:05	FSU	McCray 1-yard run (Beitia kick)	MIA 21–13
3	13:23	MIA	A. Johnson 18-yard pass from Dorsey (Sievers kick)	MIA 28–13
3	12:18	MIA	Jonathan Vilma 36-yard fumble return (Sievers kick)	MIA 35–13
3	9:56	FSU	Gardner 57-yard pass from Chris Rix (Beitia kick)	MIA 35–20
3	4:48	MIA	Capshaw 7-yard run (Sievers kick)	MIA 42–20
3	3:54	MIA	Willis McGahee 8-yard run (Sievers kick)	MIA 49–20
4	6:53	FSU	Michael Boulware 73-yard fumble return (Beitia kick)	MIA 49–27

After building up a 4–0 record, Miami won over Florida State in Doak Campbell Stadium, 49–27, ending the Seminoles' 47-game home unbeaten streak.

=== West Virginia ===
The Hurricanes then defeated West Virginia, 45–3, and Temple, 38–0, before heading to Chestnut Hill to take on Boston College (BC).

=== At Boston College ===
Miami (FL) at Boston College

Team	1	2	3	4	Total
• No. 1 Hurricanes	0	9	0	9	18
Eagles	0	0	7	0	7

- Date: November 10
- Location: Alumni Stadium, Chestnut Hill, MA
- Game start: 12:15 pm EST
- Elapsed time: 3:10
- Game attendance: 44,500
- Game weather: 50 °F (10 °C), Mostly Cloudy, Wind SW 15–25 mph (24–40 km/h)
- Referee: Tom DeJoseph
- TV announcers (ABC): Brent Musburger, Gary Danielson, Jack Arute

Scoring summary
2	14:56	MIA	Todd Sievers 38-yard field goal	MIA 3–0
2	8:45	MIA	Sievers 24-yard field goal	MIA 6–0
2	0:54	MIA	Sievers 43-yard field goal	MIA 9–0
3	5:50	BC	Sean Ryan 9-yard pass from Brian St. Pierre (Kevin McMyler kick)	MIA 9–7
4	14:50	MIA	Sievers 47-yard field goal	MIA 12–7
4	0:13	MIA	Ed Reed 80-yard interception return (kick failed)	MIA 18–7

Miami started with a 9–0 lead over the Boston College Eagles, but Miami's offense began to sputter as Dorsey struggled with the swirling winds, throwing four interceptions. The Hurricane defense picked up the slack by limiting BC to just seven points. However, in the final minute of the fourth quarter, with Miami clinging to a 12–7 lead, BC quarterback Brian St. Pierre led the Eagles from their own 30-yard line all the way down to the Hurricanes' 9-yard line. With BC on the verge of a momentous upset, St. Pierre attempted to pass to receiver Ryan Read at the Miami 2-yard line. However, the ball ricocheted off the leg of Miami cornerback Mike Rumph, landing in the hands of defensive end Matt Walters. Walters ran ten yards with the ball before teammate Ed Reed grabbed the ball out of his hands at around the Miami 20-yard line and raced the remaining 80-yards for a touchdown. Miami won 18–7.

=== Syracuse ===
After the close win over Boston College, Miami went on to win over #14 Syracuse, 59–0, and #12 Washington, 65–7, in consecutive weeks in the Orange Bowl. The combined 124–7 score is an NCAA record for largest margin of victory over consecutive ranked opponents.

=== Washington ===
Washington at Miami (FL)

Team	1	2	3	4	Total
No. 11 Huskies	0	0	7	0	7
• No. 2 Hurricanes	7	30	14	14	65

- Date: November 24
- Location: Miami Orange Bowl, Miami, FL
- Game start: 8:00 EST
- Game attendance: 78,114
- TV announcers (ABC): Brad Nessler, Bob Griese, Lynn Swann

Scoring summary
1	13:53	MIA	Clinton Portis 4-yard run (Todd Sievers kick)	MIA 7–0
2	14:53	MIA	Portis 30-yard run (Sievers kick)	MIA 14–0
2	10:23	MIA	Portis 5-yard pass from Ken Dorsey (Sievers kick)	MIA 21–0
2	8:18	MIA	Winslow safety	MIA 23–0
2	7:57	MIA	Andre Johnson 25-yard pass from Dorsey (Sievers kick)	MIA 30–0
2	7:28	MIA	McDougle 18-yard interception return (Sievers kick)	MIA 37–0
3	10:28	MIA	Najeh Davenport 1-yard run (Sievers kick)	MIA 44–0
3	9:55	WASH	Alexis 5-yard run (Anderson kick)	MIA 44–7
3	3:23	MIA	A. Johnson 3-yard pass from Dorsey (Sievers kick)	MIA 51–7
4	13:29	MIA	Frank Gore 2-yard run (Sievers kick)	MIA 58–7
4	5:00	MIA	Geathers 13-yard pass from Crudup (Sievers kick)	MIA 65–7

=== At Virginia Tech ===
Miami (FL) at Virginia Tech

Team	1	2	3	4	Total
• No. 1 Hurricanes	0	20	3	3	26
No. 14 Hokies	3	0	7	14	24

- Date: December 1
- Location: Lane Stadium, Blacksburg, VA
- Game start: 1:00 EST
- Game attendance: 53,662
- TV announcers (ABC): Brad Nessler, Bob Griese, Lynn Swann

Scoring summary
1	3:08	VT	Warley 27-yard field goal	VT 3–0
2	13:05	MIA	Jeremy Shockey 14-yard pass from Ken Dorsey (Todd Sievers kick)	MIA 7–3
2	6:11	MIA	Clinton Portis 7-yard run (Sievers kick)	MIA 14–3
2	3:59	MIA	Sievers 34-yard field goal	MIA 17–3
2	0:16	MIA	Sievers 43-yard field goal	MIA 20–3
3	10:30	VT	Ferguson 1-yard run (Warley kick)	MIA 20–10
3	4:41	MIA	Sievers 42-yard field goal	MIA 23–10
4	11:32	MIA	Sievers 39-yard field goal	MIA 26–10
4	8:33	VT	Ferguson 1-yard run (Parham pass)	MIA 26–18
4	6:03	VT	Manning 22-yard blocked punt return (pass failed)	MIA 26–24

The final hurdle to the Rose Bowl BCS National Championship Game was at Virginia Tech. Miami jumped on Virginia Tech early, leading 20–3 at halftime, and 26–10 in the fourth quarter. But despite being outgained by the Hurricanes by 134 yards and being dominated in time-of-possession, the Hokies never quit. After a Virginia Tech touchdown and two-point conversion cut Miami's lead to 26–18, the Hokies blocked a Miami punt and returned it for another score, cutting Miami's lead to just two points. But with a chance to tie the game with another two-point conversion, Virginia Tech sophomore Ernest Wilford dropped a pass in the endzone. Still, the resilient Hokies had one more chance to win the game late, taking possession of the ball at midfield and needing only a field goal to take the lead. But a diving, game-saving interception by Ed Reed sealed the Miami victory, 26–24. Defeating Virginia Tech earned the top-ranked Hurricanes an invitation to the Rose Bowl to take on BCS #2 Nebraska for the national championship.

=== Vs. Nebraska—Rose Bowl ===
Miami (FL) vs. Nebraska

Team	1	2	3	4	Total
• No. 1 Hurricanes	7	27	0	3	37
No. 4 Cornhuskers	0	0	7	7	14

- Date: January 3
- Location: Rose Bowl, Pasadena, CA
- Game attendance: 93,781
- Referee: Courtney Mauzy (ACC)
- TV announcers (ABC): Keith Jackson, Tim Brant, Todd Harris, & Lynn Swann

Scoring summary
1	6:51	MIA	Andre Johnson 50-yard pass from Ken Dorsey (Todd Sievers kick)	MIA 7–0
2	14:33	MIA	Clinton Portis 39-yard run (Sievers kick)	MIA 14–0
2	12:52	MIA	James Lewis 47-yard interception return (Sievers kick)	MIA 21–0
2	10:40	MIA	Jeremy Shockey 21-yard pass from Dorsey (Kick failed)	MIA 27–0
2	3:35	MIA	Andre Johnson 8-yard pass from Dorsey (Sievers kick)	MIA 34–0
3	2:39	NEB	Judd Davies 16-yard run (Josh Brown kick)	MIA 34–7
4	14:28	NEB	DeJuan Groce 71-yard punt return (Brown kick)	MIA 34–14
4	10:04	MIA	Sievers 37-yard field goal	MIA 37–14

Nebraska proved to be no competition for Miami, which opened up a 34–0 halftime lead en route to a 37–14 final score. Miami won its fifth national championship in the last 18 years, and put the finishing touches on a perfect 12–0 season. Dorsey passed for 362 yards and 3 touchdowns, while wide receiver Andre Johnson caught 7 passes for 199 yards and 2 touchdowns. Meanwhile, the stifling Miami defense shut down Heisman-winner Eric Crouch and the Huskers vaunted option offense, holding Nebraska 200 yards below its season average. Dorsey and Johnson were named Rose Bowl co-Most Valuable Players.

== Legacy ==
The 2001 Miami Hurricanes are widely considered to be one of the greatest teams in college football history. The Hurricanes scored 512 (42.6 points per game) points while yielding only 117 (9.75 points allowed per game), for an average of 32.9 points a game, the largest in the school's history, and while they needed decisive plays late in the fourth quarter to secure victories over Boston College and Virginia Tech, Miami won every other game on its schedule by at least 22 points, and set the NCAA record for largest margin of victory over consecutive ranked teams (124–7). The offense set the school scoring record, while the defense led the nation in scoring defense (fewest points allowed), pass defense, and turnover margin. Additionally, the Hurricane defense scored eight touchdowns of its own, and those points would have been enough to give Miami an 8-4 record even if the offense had scored no touchdowns over the season. Six players earned All-American status and six players were finalists for national awards, including Maxwell Award winner, Ken Dorsey, and Outland Trophy winner, Bryant McKinnie. Dorsey was also a Heisman finalist, finishing third.

Among the numerous stars on the 2001 Miami squad were: quarterback Ken Dorsey; running backs Clinton Portis, Willis McGahee, Najeh Davenport, and Frank Gore; tight end Jeremy Shockey; wide receiver Andre Johnson; offensive tackle Bryant McKinnie; defensive linemen Jerome McDougle, William Joseph, and Vince Wilfork; linebackers Jonathan Vilma and D.J. Williams; and defensive backs Ed Reed, Mike Rumph, and Phillip Buchanon. Additional contributors included future stars Kellen Winslow II, Sean Taylor, Antrel Rolle, Vernon Carey, and Rocky McIntosh. In all, an extraordinary 17 players from the 2001 Miami football team were drafted in the first-round of the NFL draft (5 in the 2002 NFL draft: Buchanon, McKinnie, Reed, Rumph, and Shockey; 4 in 2003: Johnson, Joseph, McDougle, and McGahee; 6 in 2004: Carey, Taylor, Vilma, Wilfork, Williams, and Winslow; 1 in 2005: Rolle; and 1 in 2006: Kelly Jennings).

Overall, 38 members of the team would be selected in the NFL draft. As of 2013, they had earned a combined total of 43 trips to the Pro Bowl: Ed Reed (9), Andre Johnson (7), Frank Gore (5), Vince Wilfork (5), Jeremy Shockey (4), Jonathan Vilma (3), Willis McGahee (2), Chris Myers (2), Clinton Portis (2), Antrel Rolle (2), Sean Taylor (2), Bryant McKinnie (1), and Kellen Winslow II (1). In addition, Vilma, Shockey, Wilfork, Joseph, Rolle, McKinnie, and Reed have won the Super Bowl. It has been estimated that the 2001 Hurricanes would cost nearly $120 million as an NFL team as early as 2009.

Prior to the 2006 Rose Bowl, ESPN's SportsCenter ran a special in which the 2005 USC Trojans, led by stars Matt Leinart, Reggie Bush, and LenDale White, were compared with the greatest college teams of the past 50 years, as picked by sports fans voting on ESPN.com, to determine their place in history. The 2001 Miami Hurricanes were the only team picked by fans to defeat the '05 Trojan squad, reflecting the esteem with which the 2001 Hurricanes are held by fans. This was before the Texas Longhorns defeated USC. However ESPN analyst Mark May placed the 2005 Trojans only behind 1995 Nebraska. Stewart Mandel of Sports Illustrated later observed that, although the 05 team "may have had the greatest set of skill players in history," "ESPN spent the better part of Christmas season comparing that Trojans squad to some of the most acclaimed teams of all time only to find out that they weren’t even the best team that season

The team's first-, second- and third-string running backs all later became running backs with a start in the NFL, a feat only done six other times. It has only been achieved by the 2010, 2012, 2013 and 2014 Alabama Crimson Tide football teams. They remain the only team to have its first-, second-, third- and fourth-string running backs all later become running backs to start in the NFL.

== Personnel ==
=== Roster ===
2001 Miami Hurricanes football team roster
Players
Coaches
Offense

Pos.	#	Name	Class
WR	1	Daryl Jones	Sr
RB	2	Willis McGahee	Fr
WR	3	Jason Geathers	So
RB	4	Najeh Davenport	Sr
WR	5	Andre Johnson	So
WR	7	Ethenic Sands	Jr
WR	9	Kevin Beard	So
QB	11	Ken Dorsey	Jr
WR	12	Nate Smith	Jr
QB	15	Buck Ortega	Fr
QB	18	Derrick Crudup	Fr
QB	19	Troy Prasek	Jr
RB	28	Clinton Portis	Jr
WR	30	Alex Duk	Fr
RB	32	Frank Gore	Fr
RB	34	Jarrett Payton	So
RB	35	Quadtrine Hill	Fr
RB	40	Kyle Cobia	Fr
RB	41	Frank Bayless	So
FB	43	Jarvis Gray	So
OL	52	Steve Adzima	Fr
OL	52	Tariq Vlaun	So
OL	53	James Sikora	So
OL	54	Alex Garcia	Fr
OL	59	Brad Kunz	Fr
OT	60	Vernon Carey	So
OL	61	Tony Tella	Fr
OL	63	Scott Puckett	Sr
OL	64	Rashad Butler	Fr
G	65	Martin Bibla	Sr
C	66	Brett Romberg	Jr
OL	67	Joe McGrath	So
OL	68	Joe Fantigrassi	Jr
OL	70	Joel Rodriguez	Fr
OL	71	Jim Wilson	Jr
G	72	Ed Wilkins	Jr
OT	73	Joaquin Gonzalez	Sr
G	74	Sherko Haji-Rasouli	Jr
OT	76	Carlos Joseph	So
OL	77	Chris Myers	Fr
OT	78	Bryant McKinnie	Sr
OL	79	Robert Bergman	Fr
TE	80	Robert Williams	Sr
TE	81	Kellen Winslow	Fr
TE	82	David Williams	Fr
TE	83	Aaron Greeno	So
WR	84	Roscoe Parrish	Fr
TE	85	Ennis Crafton	Jr
TE	86	Brandon Sebald	Fr
TE	88	Jeremy Shockey	Jr

Defense

Pos.	#	Name	Class
CB	6	Antrel Rolle	Fr
CB	8	Mike Rumph	Sr
CB	12	Jair Clarke	Fr
LB	17	D.J. Williams	So
FS	20	Ed Reed	Sr
FS	21	Jermell Weaver	So
DB	22	Kelly Jennings	Fr
SS	23	James Lewis	Sr
DB	24	Marcus Maxey	Fr
DB	25	Alfonso Marshall	So
FS	26	Sean Taylor	Fr
CB	27	Markese Fitzgerald	Sr
DB	29	James Scott	Jr
DB	30	Jeff Malley	Fr
CB	31	Phillip Buchanon	Jr
DB	36	Maurice Sikes	So
DB	37	Jean Leone	Fr
LB	38	Carl Walker	So
DE	39	LaVaar Scott	Jr
LB	44	Leon Williams	Fr
LB	45	Howard Clark	Jr
CB	46	Michael Langley	Fr
LB	47	Ken Dangerfield	Jr
LB	48	Chris Campbell	Sr
LB	49	Darrell McClover	So
LB	50	Roger McIntosh	Fr
LB	51	Jonathan Vilma	So
DE	55	Jamaal Green	Jr
DT	56	Santonio Thomas	So
LB	57	Javon Nanton	Fr
LB	58	Jarrell Weaver	So
DL	69	Kyle Morgan	Fr
DT	75	Vince Wilfork	Fr
DL	90	Thomas Carroll	Fr
DE	91	Matt Walters	Jr
DL	92	Orien Harris	Fr
DE	93	John Square	Fr
DT	94	William Joseph	Jr
DE	95	Jerome McDougle	Jr
DL	96	Miguel Robede	Fr
DT	97	Larry Anderson	So
DE	98	Cornelius Green	Sr
DE	99	Andrew Williams	Jr

Special teams

Pos.	#	Name	Class
P	13	Freddie Capshaw	Jr
K	15	Dan Lundy	Fr
K	16	Todd Sievers	Jr
K	33	Mark Gent	Fr
LS	62	Chris Harvey	So

Head coach

- Larry Coker

Coordinators/assistant coaches

- Rob Chudzinski (OC/TE)
- Randy Shannon (DC)
- Vernon Hargreaves Jr. (LB)
- Curtis Johnson (WR)
- Art Kehoe (OL)
- Greg Mark (DL)
- Don Soldinger (ST/RB)
- Mark Stoops (DB)
- Dan Werner (QB)

Legend

- (C) Team captain
- (S) Suspended
- (I) Ineligible
- Injured
- Redshirt

Roster

=== Starting lineup ===
Offense

Position	Name
QB	Ken Dorsey
HB	Clinton Portis
HB	Najeh Davenport
TE	Jeremy Shockey
WR	Andre Johnson
WR	Kevin Beard
LT	Bryant McKinnie
LG	Sherko Haji-Rasouli
C	Brett Romberg
RG	Martin Bibla
RT	Joaquin Gonzalez

Defense

Position	Name
RE	Andrew Williams
DT	Matt Walters
DT	William Joseph
LE	Jerome McDougle
OLB	D.J. Williams
MLB	Jonathan Vilma
OLB	Chris Campbell
RCB	Mike Rumph
FS	Ed Reed
SS	James Lewis
LCB	Phillip Buchanon

Special teams

Position	Name
K	Todd Sievers
P	Freddie Capshaw
KR	
PR	Phillip Buchanon

=== Depth chart ===
Offense

WR
Andre Johnson
Ethenic Sands
Jason Geathers
Alex Duk

LT	LG	C	RG	RT
Bryant McKinnie	Sherko Haji-Rasouli	Brett Romberg	Martin Bibla	Joaquin Gonzalez
Carlos Joseph	Ed Wilkins	Joel Rodriguez	Joe Fantigrassi	Vernon Carey
Rashad Butler	Scott Puckett		Jim Wilson	Chris Myers
Joe McGrath	James Sikora		Tariq Vlaun	Robert Bergman
Tony Tella	Alex Garcia		Brad Kunz	

TE
Jeremy Shockey
Robert Williams
Kellen Winslow
Enis Crafton
Kevin Everett
Aaron Greeno
Brandon Sebald
David Williams

WR
Daryl Jones
Kevin Beard
Roscoe Parrish
Nate Smith

QB
Ken Dorsey
Hunter Lefler
Tony Prasek
Jeff Malley
Buck Ortega

FB
Najeh Davenport
Jarrett Payton
Frank Bayless
Kyle Cobia
Jarvis Gray

TB
Clinton Portis
Willis McGahee
Frank Gore
Quadtrine Hill

Defense

CB
Phillip Buchanon
Markese Fitzgerald
Antrel Rolle
Marcus Maxey
Jair Clark
Michael Langley

FS
Ed Reed
Sean Taylor
Jermell Weaver

DE	DT	DT	DE
Jerome McDougle	William Joseph	Matt Walters	Andrew Williams
LaVaar Scott	Santonio Thomas	Vince Wilfork	Cornelius Green
Jamaal Green	Orien Harris	Larry Anderson	John Square
Kyle Morgan	Jarvis Gray	Thomas Carroll	Miguel Robede

WLB	MLB	SLB
D.J. Williams	Jonathan Vilma	Chris Campbell
Darrell McClover	Howard Clark	Jarrell Weaver
Leon Williams	Ken Dangerfield	Roger McIntosh
Steve Adzima		Javon Nanton

CB
Mike Rumph
Alfonso Marshall
Kelly Jennings
Carl Walker
Jean Leone

SS
James Lewis
Maurice Sikes

== Statistics ==
(From 1937 to 2001, bowl games did not count towards season statistics)

- QB Ken Dorsey: 184/318 (57.9%) for 2,652 yards (8.3) with 23 TD vs. 9 INT
- RB Clinton Portis: 220 carries for 1,200 yards (5.5) with 10 TD. 12 catches for 125 yards and 1 TD.
- RB Frank Gore: 62 carries for 562 yards (9.1) with 5 TD.
- RB Willis McGahee: 67 carries for 314 yards (4.7) with 3 TD.
- TE Jeremy Shockey: 40 catches for 519 yards (13.0) and 7 TD.
- WR Andre Johnson: 37 catches, 682 yards (18.43) and 10 TD.
- WR Kevin Beard: 25 catches for 409 yards (16.4) and 2 TD.
- K Todd Sievers: 21/26 FG (80.8%).
- S Ed Reed: 9 INT, 12 TD.
- LB Jonathan Vilma: 73 tackles
- DT William Joseph: 10 sacks

== Awards and honors ==
=== First Team All-Americans ===
- Phillip Buchanon, PR
- Joaquin Gonzalez, RT
- Bryant McKinnie, LT (consensus)
- Ed Reed, SS (consensus)
- Jeremy Shockey, TE
- Todd Sievers, K

=== All-Conference Selections (First Team) ===
- Martin Bibla, LG
- Phillip Buchanon, CB
- Freddie Capshaw, P
- Ken Dorsey, QB
- Joaquin Gonzalez, RT
- Jerome McDougle, DE
- Bryant McKinnie, LT
- Clinton Portis, RB
- Ed Reed, SS
- Brett Romberg, C
- Jeremy Shockey, TE
- Todd Sievers, K
- Jonathan Vilma, MLB

=== Awards Finalists ===
Bold indicates winners

- **Larry Coker**, Coach - **Paul "Bear" Bryant Award**
- Phillip Buchanon, PR - Mosi Tatupu Award
- Freddie Capshaw, P - Ray Guy Award
- **Ken Dorsey**, QB - **Maxwell Award**, Heisman Trophy (3rd), **Big East Offensive Player of the Year**
- **Joaquin Gonzalez**, RT - **Academic Heisman**
- **Bryant McKinnie**, LT - **Outland Trophy**, Heisman Trophy (8th)
- Ed Reed, SS - Jim Thorpe Award
- Brett Romberg, C - Rimington Trophy
- Jeremy Shockey, TE - John Mackey Award
- Todd Sievers, K - Lou Groza Award (4th)

=== Jack Harding University of Miami MVP award ===
- Ken Dorsey, QB and Ed Reed, SS

== NFL draft selections ==
Player	Position	Round	Pick	Year	NFL team
Andre Johnson	Wide Receiver	1	3	2003	Houston Texans
Sean Taylor	Defensive Back	1	5	2004	Washington Redskins
Kellen Winslow II	Tight End	1	6	2004	Cleveland Browns
Bryant McKinnie	Tackle	1	7	2002	Minnesota Vikings
Antrel Rolle	Defensive Back	1	8	2005	Arizona Cardinals
Jonathan Vilma	Linebacker	1	12	2004	New York Jets
Jeremy Shockey	Tight End	1	14	2002	New York Giants
Jerome McDougle	Defensive Line	1	15	2003	Philadelphia Eagles
Phillip Buchanon	Defensive Back	1	17	2002	Oakland Raiders
D. J. Williams	Linebacker	1	18	2004	Denver Broncos
Vernon Carey	Tackle	1	19	2004	Miami Dolphins
Vince Wilfork	Defensive Line	1	21	2004	New England Patriots
Willis McGahee	Running Back	1	23	2003	Buffalo Bills
Ed Reed	Defensive Back	1	24	2002	Baltimore Ravens
William Joseph	Defensive Line	1	25	2003	New York Giants
Mike Rumph	Defensive Back	1	27	2002	San Francisco 49ers
Kelly Jennings	Defensive Back	1	31	2006	Seattle Seahawks
Rocky McIntosh	Linebacker	2	35	2006	Washington Redskins
Clinton Portis	Running Back	2	51	2002	Denver Broncos
Roscoe Parrish	Wide Receiver	2	55	2005	Buffalo Bills
Frank Gore	Running Back	3	65	2005	San Francisco 49ers
Andrew Williams	Defensive Line	3	89	2003	San Francisco 49ers
Rashad Butler	Tackle	3	89	2006	Carolina Panthers
Leon Williams	Linebacker	4	110	2006	Cleveland Browns
Martin Bibla	Guard	4	116	2002	Atlanta Falcons
Jamaal Green	Defensive Line	4	131	2003	Philadelphia Eagles
Orien Harris	Defensive Line	4	133	2006	Pittsburgh Steelers
Najeh Davenport	Running Back	4	135	2002	Green Bay Packers
Matt Walters	Defensive Line	5	150	2003	New York Jets
Marcus Maxey	Defensive Back	5	154	2006	Kansas City Chiefs
James Lewis	Defensive Back	6	183	2002	Indianapolis Colts
Chris Myers	Guard	6	200	2005	Denver Broncos
Darrell McClover	Linebacker	7	213	2004	New York Jets
Alfonso Marshall	Defensive Back	7	215	2004	Chicago Bears
Daryl Jones	Wide Receiver	7	226	2002	New York Giants
Joaquin Gonzalez	Tackle	7	227	2002	Cleveland Browns
Ken Dorsey	Quarterback	7	241	2003	San Francisco 49ers
Carlos Joseph	Tackle	7	254	2004	San Diego Chargers
