= 2001 All-Big East Conference football team =

American college football all-star team

The 2001 All-Big East Conference football team consists of American football players from the Big East Conference who were chosen as the best at their respective positions during the 2001 NCAA Division I-A football season. The organizations selecting All-Big East teams in 2001 included the conference's head football coaches. The coaches chose both first- and second-team players.

Miami. The 2001 Miami Hurricanes compiled a perfect 12–0 record, were consensus national champions, and dominated the conference awards with 14 players named to the first team. In addition, Larry Coker was selected as the Big East coach of the year; quarterback Ken Dorsey tied for Big East offensive player of the year; safety Ed Reed tied as co-offensive player of the year; and cornerback and return specialist Phillip Buchanon was named the special teams player of the year. Dorsey passed for 2,652 yards and 23 touchdowns and also won the Maxwell Award as the outstanding player in college football.

Syracuse. The Syracuse Orange finished second and placed three on the first team: senior defensive end Dwight Freeney, senior offensive guard Sean O'Connor, and junior linebacker Clifton Smith. Freeney set an NCAA record with 17.5 sacks, set Big East records with eight forced fumbles and 25.5 tackles for loss, and tied for the Big East co-defensive player of the year award. Five Syracuse players received second-team honors.

Virginia Tech. The Virginia Tech Hokies finished in a three-way tie for third place and placed four players on the first team: wide receiver André Davis; defensive tackle David Pugh; linebacker Ben Taylor; and cornerback Ronyell Whitaker. Tailback Kevin Jones set a Big East freshman record with 957 rushing yards and was selected as the Big East rookie of the year.

Boston College. Boston College tied for third place and placed only one player, running back William Green, on the first team. Green also tied for the Big East offensive player of the year award. Eight Boston College players were named to the second team.

Pittsburgh. Pittsburgh also tied for third place. Three Pitt players received first-team honors: junior wide receiver Antonio Bryant; junior linebacker Gerald Hayes; and junior free safety Ramon Walker.

Others. Junior defensive tackle Dan Klecko was the only Temple player selected to the first team. West Virginia and Rutgers had no players named to the first team.

== Offensive selections ==
=== Quarterbacks ===
- Ken Dorsey, Miami (Coaches-1)
- Brian St. Pierre, Boston College (Coaches-2)

=== Running backs ===
- William Green, Boston College (Coaches-1)
- Clinton Portis, Miami (Coaches-1)
- James Mungro, Syracuse (Coaches-2)
- Avon Cobourne, West Virginia (Coaches-2)

=== Wide receivers ===
- Antonio Bryant, Pitt (Coaches-1)
- André Davis, Virginia Tech (Coaches-1)
- Andrew Johnson, Miami (Coaches-2)
- Sean Dillard, Temple (Coaches-2)

=== Tight ends ===
- Jeremy Shockey, Miami (Coaches-1)
- L. J. Smith, Rutgers (Coaches-2)

=== Offensive tackles ===
- Bryant McKinnie, Miami (Coaches-1)
- Joaquin Gonzalez, Miami (Coaches-1)
- Marc Colombo, Boston College (Coaches-2)
- P. J. Alexander, Syracuse (Coaches-2)

=== Offensive guard ===
- Martin Bibla, Miami (Coaches-1)
- Sean O'Connor, Syracuse (Coaches-1)
- Sherko Haji-Rasouli (Coaches-2)
- Marc Parenteau, Boston College (Coaches-2)

=== Centers ===
- Brett Romberg, Miami (Coaches-1)
- Dan Koppen, Boston College (Coaches-2)

== Defensive selections ==
=== Defensive line ===
- Jerome McDougle, Miami (Coaches-1)
- Dwight Freeney, Syracuse (Coaches-1)
- Dan Klecko, Temple (Coaches-1)
- David Pugh, Virginia Tech (Coaches-1)
- Antonio Garay, Boston College (Coaches-2)
- Sean Guthrie, Boston College (Coaches-2)
- William Joseph, Miami (Coaches-2)
- Chad Beasley, Virginia Tech (Coaches-2)

=== Linebackers ===
- Jonathan Vilman, Miami (Coaches-1)
- Gerald Hayes, Pitt (Coaches-1)
- Clifton Smith, Syracuse (Coaches-1)
- Ben Taylor, Virginia Tech (Coaches-1)
- Scott Bradley, Boston College (Coaches-2)
- Bryan Knight, Pitt (Coaches-2)
- Kyle Kayden, West Virginia (Coaches-2)

=== Cornerbacks ===
- Phillip Buchanon, Miami (Coaches-1)
- Ronyell Whitaker, Virginia Tech (Coaches-1)
- Mike Rumph, Miami (Coaches-2)
- Willie Ford, Syracuse (Coaches-2)

=== Safeties ===
- Ed Reed, Miami (Coaches-1)
- Ramon Walker, Pitt (Coaches-1)
- Quentin Harris, Syracuse (Coaches-2)
- Rick Sherrod, West Virginia (Coaches-2)

== Special teams ==
=== Kickers ===
- Todd Sievers, Miami (Coaches-1)
- Brenden Rauh, West Virginia (Coaches-2)

=== Punters ===
- Freddie Capshaw, Miami (Coaches-1)
- Mike Shafer, Syracuse (Coaches-2)
- Kevin McMyler, Boston College (Coaches-2)

=== Return specialist ===
- Phillip Buchanon, Miami (Coaches-1)
- Shawn Terry, West Virginia (Coaches-2)

== Individual awards ==
- Offensive player of the year - William Green, Boston College; Ken Dorsey, Miami (tie)
- Defensive player of the year - Ed Reed, Miami; Dwight Freeney, Syracuse (tie)
- Special teams player of the year - Phillip Buchanon, Miami
- Rookie of the year - Kevin Jones, Virginia Tech
- Coach of the year - Larry Coker, Miami

== Key ==
Coaches, selected by the conference coaches

== See also ==
- 2001 All-America college football team
