= 1999 Miami Hurricanes football team =

American college football season

1999 Miami Hurricanes football

Gator Bowl champion

Gator Bowl, W 28–13 vs. Georgia Tech
- Conference: Big East Conference

Ranking
- Coaches: No. 15
- AP: No. 15
- Record: 9–4 (6–1 Big East)
- Head coach: Butch Davis (5th season)
- Offensive coordinator: Larry Coker (5th season)
- Defensive coordinator: Greg Schiano (1st season)
- MVP: Bubba Franks
- Home stadium: Miami Orange Bowl

1999 Big East Conference football standings
	Conf.			Overall
Team	W		L	W		L
No. 2 Virginia Tech $	7	–	0	11	–	1
No. 15 Miami (FL)	6	–	1	9	–	4
Boston College	4	–	3	8	–	4
Syracuse	3	–	4	7	–	5
West Virginia	3	–	4	4	–	7
Pittsburgh	2	–	5	5	–	6
Temple	2	–	5	2	–	9
Rutgers	1	–	6	1	–	10
$ – BCS representative as conference champion; Rankings from AP Poll

The 1999 Miami Hurricanes football team represented the University of Miami as a member of the Big East Conference during the 1999 NCAA Division I-A football season. Led by fifth-year head coach Butch Davis, the Hurricanes compiled an overall record of 9–4 with a mark of 6–1 in conference play, placing second in the Big East. Miami was invited to the Gator Bowl, where the Hurricanes defeated Georgia Tech. The team played home games at the Miami Orange Bowl in Miami.

== Schedule ==
Date	Time	Opponent	Rank	Site	TV	Result	Attendance	Source
August 29	2:30 pm	vs. No. 9 Ohio State*	No. 12	Giants Stadium; East Rutherford, NJ (Kickoff Classic)	ABC	W 23–12	73,037	
September 4	7:00 pm	No. 6 (I-AA) Florida A&M*	No. 8	Miami Orange Bowl; Miami, FL	ESPN Plus	W 57–3	54,147	
September 18	3:30 pm	No. 3 Penn State*	No. 8	Miami Orange Bowl; Miami, FL	CBS	L 23–27	74,427	
September 25	6:00 pm	at East Carolina*	No. 9	Carter–Finley Stadium; Raleigh, NC	ESPN2	L 23–27	45,900	
October 9	12:00 pm	at No. 1 Florida State*	No. 19	Doak Campbell Stadium; Tallahassee, FL (rivalry)	ABC	L 21–31	80,976	
October 23	12:00 pm	at Boston College	No. 23	Alumni Stadium; Chestnut Hill, MA	CBS	W 31–28	44,084	
October 30	12:00 pm	West Virginia	No. 23	Miami Orange Bowl; Miami, FL	CBS	W 28–20	30,310	
November 6	12:00 pm	at Pittsburgh	No. 22	Pitt Stadium; Pittsburgh, PA	ESPN Plus	W 33–3	38,710	
November 13	7:30 pm	at No. 2 Virginia Tech	No. 19	Lane Stadium; Blacksburg, VA (rivalry, College GameDay)	ESPN	L 10–43	53,130	
November 20	12:00 pm	Rutgers^{†}		Miami Orange Bowl; Miami, FL		W 55–0	21,167	
November 27	3:30 pm	Syracuse		Miami Orange Bowl; Miami, FL	CBS	W 45–13	35,208	
December 4	12:00 pm	Temple	No. 23	Miami Orange Bowl; Miami, FL		W 55–0	20,319	
January 1	12:30 pm	vs. No. 17 Georgia Tech*	No. 23	Alltel Stadium; Jacksonville, FL (Gator Bowl)	NBC	W 28–13	43,416	
*Non-conference game; ^{†}Homecoming; Rankings from AP Poll released prior to the game; All times are in Eastern time

== Rankings ==
Ranking movements Legend: ██ Increase in ranking ██ Decrease in ranking — = Not ranked
	Week																
Poll	Pre	1	2	3	4	5	6	7	8	9	10	11	12	13	14	15	Final
AP	12	8	8	8	9	18	19	24	23	23	22	19	—	—	23	23	15
Coaches Poll	12	12*	9	9	13	20	21	24	23	23	22	19	—	—	24	23	15
BCS	Not released									—	—	—	—	—	—	—	Not released

== Game summaries ==
=== Ohio State ===
Kickoff Classic: Miami (FL) Hurricanes vs. Ohio State Buckeyes

Quarter	1	2	3	4	Total
Miami (FL)	7	16	0	0	23
Ohio St	9	0	3	0	12

at Giants Stadium • East Rutherford, New Jersey

- Date: August 29
- Game time: 2:30 p.m. EDT
- Game weather: Clear • 85 °F (29 °C) • Wind 10–20 N
- Game attendance: 73,037
- Referee: Jack Childress (ACC)
- TV announcers (ABC): Brent Musburger, Dan Fouts, and Dean Blevins
- Box Score

Game information

Miami (FL)

- Kenny Kelly
  17/25, 245 Yds, TD, 2 INT
- James Jackson
  24 Rush, 89 Yds, TD
- Santana Moss
  3 Rec, 115 Yds, TD

Ohio St

- Austin Moherman
  10/22, 107 Yds, TD, 2 INT
- Michael Wiley
  9 Rush, 72 Yds
- Reggie Germany
  4 Rec, 56 Yds

Scoring summary

Quarter	Time	Drive			Team	Scoring information	Score	
Quarter	Time	Plays	Yards	TOP	Team	Scoring information	MIA	OSU
1	11:44	2	42	0:49	Miami (FL)	Jackson 44-yard touchdown run, Crosland kick good	7	0
1	9:30	5	74	2:14	Ohio St	23-yard field goal by Stultz	7	3
1	7:08	2	7	0:40	Ohio St	Wisniewski 6-yard touchdown reception from Moherman, Stultz kick no good	7	9
2	3:14	4	59	1:09	Miami (FL)	Kelly 7-yard touchdown run, 2-point pass good	15	9
2	0:08	4	78	1:48	Miami (FL)	Moss 67-yard touchdown reception from Kelly, 2-point run good	23	9
3	3:40	9	41	4:48	Ohio St	24-yard field goal by Stultz	23	12
"TOP" = time of possession. For other American football terms, see Glossary of American football.							23	12

=== Boston College ===
Team	1	2	3	4	Total
• Miami (FL)	0	0	7	24	31
Boston College	14	7	7	0	28

- Date: October 23
- Location: Alumni Stadium, Chestnut Hill, Massachusetts
- Game attendance: 44,084
- TV announcers (CBS): Craig Bolerjack & Ed Cunningham

Scoring summary
Q1	11:04	BC	Arndt 17 yard pass from Hasselbeck (Matich kick)	BC 7–0
Q1	3:47	BC	Green 2 yard run (Matich kick)	BC 14–0
Q2	12:05	BC	Rowe 7 yard run (Matich kick)	BC 21–0
Q3	6:18	BC	Washington 3 yard run (Matich kick)	BC 28–0
Q3	2:11	MIA	McPartland 8 yard pass from Kelly (Crosland kick)	BC 28–7
Q4	10:07	MIA	Jackson 32 yard pass from Kelly (Crosland kick)	BC 28–14
Q4	9:45	MIA	Jackson 6 yard run (Crosland kick)	BC 28–21
Q4	3:51	MIA	Franks 10 yard pass from Kelly (Crosland kick)	Tie 28–28
Q4	:03	MIA	Crosland 30 yard field goal	MIA 31–28

- James Jackson 22 Rush, 134 Yds, 3 Rec, 40 Yds

== Roster ==
1999 Miami Hurricanes football team roster
Players
Coaches
Offense

Pos.	#	Name	Class
RB	4	Najeh Davenport	So
WR	6	Santana Moss	Jr
QB	11	Ken Dorsey	Fr
QB	15	Kenny Kelly	So
FB	18	Mondriel Fulcher	Sr
RB	21	James Jackson	Jr
RB	28	Clinton Portis	Fr
G	62	Richard Mercier	Sr
G	65	Martin Bibla	So
OT	73	Joaquin Gonzalez	So
OT	78	Bryant McKinnie	Jr
WR	84	Andre King	Jr
WR	87	Reggie Wayne	Jr
TE	88	Bubba Franks	Jr

Defense

Pos.	#	Name	Class
CB	8	Mike Rumph	So
FS	20	Ed Reed	So
CB	22	Leonard Myers	Jr
DB	23	James Lewis	So
LB	44	Dan Morgan	Jr
LB	48	Chris Campbell	So
LB	52	Nate Webster	Jr
DE	91	Matt Walters	Fr
DT	92	Damione Lewis	Jr
DE	93	Michael Boireau	Sr
DE	94	William Joseph	Fr

Special teams

Pos.	#	Name	Class

Head coach

- Butch Davis

Coordinators/assistant coaches

Legend

- (C) Team captain
- (S) Suspended
- (I) Ineligible
- Injured
- Redshirt

Roster
