= 2002 All-Big East Conference football team =

American college football all-star team

The 2002 All-Big East Conference football team consists of American football players from the Big East Conference who were chosen as the best at their respective positions during the 2002 NCAA Division I-A football season. The organizations selecting All-Big East teams in 2002 included the conference's head football coaches. The coaches chose both first- and second-team players.

== Offensive selections ==
=== Quarterbacks ===
- Ken Dorsey, Miami (Coaches-1)
- Rod Rutherford, Pitt (Coaches-2)

=== Running backs ===
- Willis McGahee, Miami (Coaches-1)
- Avon Cobourne, West Virginia (Coaches-1)
- Derrick Knight, Boston College (Coaches-2)
- Lee Suggs, Virginia Tech (Coaches-2)

=== Wide receivers ===
- Andre Johnson, Miami (Coaches-1)
- Larry Fitzgerald, Pitt (Coaches-1)
- Jamel Riddle, Syracuse (Coaches-2)
- David Tyree, Syracuse (Coaches-2)
- Ernest Wilford, Virginia Tech (Coaches-2)

=== Tight ends ===
- Kellen Winslow, Miami (Coaches-1)
- Sean Ryan, Boston College (Coaches-2)

=== Offensive tackles ===
- Lance Nimmo, West Virginia (Coaches-1)
- Marc Parenteau, Boston College (Coaches-1)

=== Offensive guard ===
- Bryan Anderson, Pitt (Coaches-1)
- Sherko Haji-Rasouli, Miami (Coaches-1)

=== Centers ===
- Brett Romberg, Miami(Coaches-1)

== Defensive selections ==
=== Defensive line ===
- William Joseph, Miami (Coaches-1)
- Jerome McDougle, Miami (Coaches-1)
- Claude Harriott, Pitt (Coaches-1)
- Dan Klecko, Temple (Coaches-1)
- Jamaal Green, Miami (Coaches-2)
- Louis Gachelin, Syracuse (Coaches-2)
- Nathaniel Adibi, Virginia Tech (Coaches-2)
- David Upchurch, West Virginia (Coaches-2)

=== Linebackers ===
- Jonathan Vilma, Miami (Coaches-1)
- Gerald Hayes, Pitt (Coaches-1)
- Grant Wiley, West Virginia (Coaches-1)
- D. J. Williams, Miami (Coaches-2)
- Clifton Smith, Syracuse (Coaches-2)
- James Davis, West Virginia (Coaches-2)

=== Cornerbacks ===
- Antrel Rolle, Miami (Coaches-1)
- Torrie Cox, Pitt (Coaches-1)
- Shawn Seabrooks, Rutgers (Coaches-2)
- DeAngelo Hall, Virginia Tech (Coaches-2)

=== Safeties ===
- Maurice Sikes, Miami (Coaches-1)
- Sean Taylor, Miami (Coaches-1)
- Willie Pile, Virginia Tech (Coaches-2)
- Angel Estrada, West Virginia (Coaches-2)

== Special teams ==
=== Kickers ===
- Todd Sievers, Miami (Coaches-1)
- Sandro Sciortino, Boston College (Coaches-2)
- Cap Poklemba, Temple (Coaches-2)

=== Punters ===
- Andy Lee, Pitt (Coaches-1)
- Vinnie Burns, Virginia Tech (Coaches-2)

=== Return specialist ===
- Nate Jones, Rutgers (Coaches-1)
- Jamel Riddle, Syracuse (Coaches-2)
- DeAngelo Hall, Virginia Tech (Coaches-2)

== Individual awards ==
- Offensive player of the year - Ken Dorsey, Miami, and Willis McGahee, Miami
- Defensive player of the year - Dan Klecko, Temple
- Special teams player of the year - Andy Lee, Pitt, and Nate Jones, Rutgers
- Rookie of the year - Larry Fitzgerald, Pitt
- Coach of the year - Larry Coker, Miami

== Key ==
Coaches, selected by the conference coaches

== See also ==
- 2002 All-America college football team
