= Carlos Joseph =

American football player (1980–2021)

No. 60, 75, 76
- Position: Offensive tackle

Personal information
- Born: July 14, 1980; Miami, Florida, U.S.
- Died: January 12, 2021 (aged 40); Miami, Florida, U.S.
- Listed height: 6 ft 6 in (1.98 m)
- Listed weight: 342 lb (155 kg)

Career information
- High school: Miami Edison
- College: Miami (FL)
- NFL draft: 2004: 7th round, 254th overall pick

Career history
- San Diego Chargers (2004–2005)*; Philadelphia Eagles (2005)*; Cologne Centurions (2006); Berlin Thunder (2006); Jacksonville Jaguars (2006)*; Las Vegas Gladiators (2007); Manchester Wolves (2009)
- * Offseason or practice squad member only

Awards and highlights
- BCS national champion (2001); Second-team All-Big East (2002)

Carlos Joseph (July 14, 1980 – January 12, 2021) was an American football player. He played college football for the Miami Hurricanes. He was selected by the San Diego Chargers of the National Football League (NFL) in the seventh round of the 2004 NFL draft.

== Career ==
Joseph attended Miami Edison High before going to the University of Miami. A Haitian American, he and his brother William, who played defensive tackle, were nicknamed the "Haitian Sensations" during their time together on the Hurricanes. Joseph was a backup to Bryant McKinnie at left tackle on their national championship team in 2001. He became a starter as a junior in 2002, when he was a second-team all-conference selection in the Big East.

Coming out of UM, Joseph was not expected to contribute immediately for San Diego. While he had long arms and a large physique at 6 feet 6 inches (1.98 m) and 345 pounds (156 kg), he needed work on his technique and reliability. The Chargers signed him to a three-year contract. Joseph was among San Diego's final round of cuts in the preseason, but he was signed the following day to their practice squad for 2004. He was cut the following preseason before their final exhibition game in 2005.

In 2006, Joseph was signed by the Jacksonville Jaguars, who assigned him to NFL Europe, where he played for the Berlin Thunder. The Jaguars released him in August.

== Personal life ==
Joseph's brother William became an NFL player.

Joseph died on January 12, 2021, of a brain aneurysm. He was 40.
