= Sherko =

Sherko, also Şêrko, is a Kurdish given name for males and may refer to: it also been seen in Sweden

- Asad Ad-Din Sherko, a Kurdish General of Zengid army and uncle of Saladin
- Mujahid Sherko, Ayyubid ruler of Hims, Palmyra and Rahba
- Sherko Bekas (1940–2013), Kurdish poet
- Sherko Fatah (born 1964), German writer
- Sherko Haji-Rasouli (born 1980), Canadian football player from Iran
- Sherko Karim (born 1996), Iraqi-Kurdish footballer
- Sherko Moarefi (1980–2013), Kurdish-Iranian activist
