= Moarefi =

Moarefi (Persian: معارفي) may refer to:

- Sherko Moarefi, Kurdish activist
- Moarefi, Iran, a village in Kermanshah Province
