= Chris Myers (American football) =

American football player (born 1981)

No. 62, 55
- Position: Center

Personal information
- Born: September 15, 1981 (age 45); Miami, Florida, U.S.
- Listed height: 6 ft 4 in (1.93 m)
- Listed weight: 290 lb (132 kg)

Career information
- High school: Miami Palmetto (Pinecrest, Florida)
- College: Miami (FL) (2000–2004)
- NFL draft: 2005: 6th round, 200th overall pick

Career history
- Denver Broncos (2005–2007); Houston Texans (2008–2014)

Awards and highlights
- 2× Pro Bowl (2011, 2012); BCS national champion (2001); Second-team All-ACC (2004)

Career NFL statistics
- Games played: 153
- Games started: 128
- Stats at Pro Football Reference

Christopher Myers Jr. (born September 15, 1981) is an American former professional football player who was a center in the National Football League (NFL). He played college football for the Miami Hurricanes, and was selected by the Denver Broncos in the sixth round of the 2005 NFL draft. He also played for the Houston Texans. He was a two-time Pro Bowl selection with the Texans.

== Early life ==
Myers is a graduate of Miami Palmetto High School. Coming out of high school Myers was ranked the 47th best prospect in the state of Florida by SuperPrep. The Miami Herald also named him to the Class 6A-5A All-Dade first team.

== College career ==
Myers attended the University of Miami and was a part of some of the school's most successful teams during his time there. He red shirted during the 2000 season. In the 2001 national championship season Myers played as a reserve on the offensive line in seven games. During the 2002 season Myers became a starter at right guard. Myers was part of an offensive line that protected and blocked for Heisman Trophy finalist Ken Dorsey. Myers was also part of an offensive line that paved the way for Willis McGahee who enjoyed a breakout season in 2002. McGahee rushed for 1,753 yards in 2002 and led the NCAA in rushing touchdowns with 28. Like Dorsey, McGahee was additionally a Heisman finalist. The offensive line that season only allowed 11 sacks and Myers was only personally responsible for one of those sacks. The line also blocked for a running game that averaged 183 yards per game.

During the 2003 season Myers once again started at right guard, however towards the end of the season he started three games at center. His efforts were good enough for him to be named to the All Big East second team. Once again Myers only gave up one sack and led the offensive line in least sacks given up. With McGahee gone the Hurricanes used a stable of three running backs in the 2003 season. Jarrett Payton, Tyrone Moss, and Frank Gore collectively rushed for 1,964 yards and the Miami rushing attack was ranked 33rd in the nation.

As a senior in 2004 Myers switched positions and became the starter at right tackle.

== Professional career ==
=== Denver Broncos ===
Myers was drafted by the Denver Broncos in the 2005 NFL draft in the sixth round, 200th overall.

In the 2007 season, Myers showed his versatility by starting the season as an offensive guard before shifting to center, replacing an injured Tom Nalen.

=== Houston Texans ===
A restricted free agent in the 2008 offseason, Myers was involved in a sign-and-trade on March 17. The Broncos signed him to a four-year, $11 million contract with $3 million guaranteed and then traded him to the Houston Texans in exchange for a sixth-round pick in the 2008 NFL draft. While with the Texans, Myers' play at center was one of the biggest reasons for teammate Arian Foster's success at running back. As the starting center for the Texans in 2010, he anchored an offensive line that helped Foster lead the league in rushing. In 2011, the Texans had the second ranked rushing attack in the league and made their first playoff appearance in the franchise's history. After the 2011 season, Myers was rewarded with a four-year, $25 million contract. On March 4, 2015, Myers was released by the Texans.

On August 25, 2015, Myers announced his retirement from the league on In The Loop with Nick & Lopez on SportsRadio 610.

He joined the staff of the Texans flagship, SportsRadio 610, a few weeks before his announcement.
