= McClover =

McClover is a surname. Notable people with the surname include:

- Darrell McClover (born 1981), American football player
- Stanley McClover (born 1984), American football player
