= Joaquin Gonzalez (American football) =

American football player (born 1979)

No. 73, 74
- Position: Offensive tackle

Personal information
- Born: September 7, 1979 (age 47); Miami, Florida, U.S.
- Listed height: 6 ft 5 in (1.96 m)
- Listed weight: 310 lb (141 kg)

Career information
- High school: Christopher Columbus (Miami)
- College: Miami (FL)
- NFL draft: 2002: 7th round, 227th overall pick

Career history
- Cleveland Browns (2002–2004); Indianapolis Colts (2005)

Awards and highlights
- BCS national champion (2001); William V. Campbell Trophy (2001); 2× First-team All-American (2000, 2001); First-team All-Big East (2001)

Career NFL statistics
- Games played: 64
- Games started: 39
- Stats at Pro Football Reference

Joaquin Antonio Gonzalez (born September 7, 1979) is an American former professional football player who was an offensive tackle in the National Football League (NFL) for the Cleveland Browns and Indianapolis Colts. He played college football for the Miami Hurricanes and was selected in the seventh round of the 2002 NFL draft.

== Early life ==
Gonzalez attended Columbus High School in Miami, Florida, and was a student, a letterman in football and track and field, and as a senior, he was also named Columbus' Student Athlete of the Year and was a recipient of the President's Education Award. In football, as a senior, he was named as his team's Most Valuable Offensive Lineman and was an Honorable Mention All-Dade County selection. Gonzalez graduated from Columbus High School in 1997.

== College career ==
In college, Gonzalez played alongside Bryant McKinnie on the offensive line, protecting quarterback Ken Dorsey during the Miami Hurricanes' national championship season in 2001. Gonzalez was named first-team All-American in 2000 and 2001.
