= Andrew Williams (American football) =

American football player (born 1979)

No. 94, 99
- Position: Defensive end

Personal information
- Born: April 18, 1979 (age 47); Tampa, Florida, U.S.
- Listed height: 6 ft 2 in (1.88 m)
- Listed weight: 280 lb (127 kg)

Career information
- High school: Hillsborough (Tampa)
- College: Hinds CC (1999–2000); Miami (FL) (2001–2002)
- NFL draft: 2003: 3rd round, 89th overall pick

Career history
- San Francisco 49ers (2003–2004); Tampa Bay Buccaneers (2005–2006)*; Orlando Predators (2007)*
- * Offseason or practice squad member only

Awards and highlights
- BCS national champion (2001)

Career NFL statistics
- Total tackles: 12
- Pass deflections: 1
- Stats at Pro Football Reference
- Stats at ArenaFan.com

Andrew B. Williams (born April 18, 1979) is an American former professional football player who was a defensive end for the San Francisco 49ers of the National Football League (NFL). He was selected by the 49ers in the third round of the 2003 NFL draft. He played college football at Hinds Community College and Miami (FL).

== Early life ==
Williams played high school football at Hillsborough High School in Tampa, Florida. He recorded 99 tackles, 6.5 sacks, five forced fumbles and three fumble recoveries his senior year in 1998, earning first-team All-State honors. He also lettered in basketball, totaling 15.5 points per game and 11.2 rebounds per game his senior season.

== College career ==
Williams first played college football at Hinds Community College from 1999 to 2000. He garnered Junior College All-Region and first-team All-State recognition in 1999. He accumulated 93 tackles (56 of which were solo) and 20 sacks in 2000, earning Junior College Defensive Most Valuable Player for the state of Mississippi, Region 23 Defensive Lineman of the Year, first-team All-State, All-Region, and honorable mention Junior College All-American honors.

Williams transferred to play for the Miami Hurricanes from 2001 to 2002. He played in eight games, starting five, at defensive end in 2001, totaling 30 tackles (13 solo), four sacks, two forced fumbles, two fumble recoveries, and four pass breakups. He was part of the Miami team that won the national championship in 2001. Williams appeared in 13 games, no starts, in 2002, accumulating 38 (20 solo), four sacks, two pass breakups and a fumble recovery that was returned for a touchdown.

== Professional career ==
Williams was selected 89th overall by the San Francisco 49ers in the third round of the 2003 NFL draft. He officially signed with the team on July 24, 2003. He played in two games in 2003, recording one solo tackle. Williams appeared in seven games, starting three, during the 2004 season, totaling nine solo tackles, two assisted tackles and one pass breakup. He was waived on August 29, 2005.

Williams was claimed off waivers by the Tampa Bay Buccaneers on August 30, 2005. He was waived by the Buccaneers on September 3 and signed to the team's practice squad on September 5, 2005. He signed a reserve/future contract with the Buccaneers on January 9, 2006. Williams was waived on September 2, 2006.

Williams signed with the Orlando Predators of the Arena Football League on November 2, 2006. He was waived on February 18, 2007.
