= Markese Fitzgerald =

American football player (born 1979)

No. 39
- Position: Defensive back

Personal information
- Born: April 25, 1979 (age 47); St. Petersburg, Florida, U.S.
- Listed height: 5 ft 10 in (1.78 m)
- Listed weight: 184 lb (83 kg)

Career information
- High school: Dixie M. Hollins (St. Petersburg)
- College: Miami (FL) (1997–2001)
- NFL draft: 2002: undrafted

Career history
- Tampa Bay Buccaneers (2002)*; Indianapolis Colts (2002)*; Dallas Cowboys (2002)*; Winnipeg Blue Bombers (2004)
- * Offseason or practice squad member only

Awards and highlights
- National champion (2001)

Markese Demetrius Fitzgerald (born April 25, 1979) is an American former football defensive back. He played college football for the Miami Hurricanes, and professionally in the Canadian Football League.

== Early life ==
Markese Demetrius Fitzgerald was born on April 25, 1979, in St. Petersburg, Florida. He played high school football at Dixie M. Hollins High School in St. Petersburg. He posted 110 tackles, four sacks, and five interceptions as a senior, earning first-team All-State honors.

== College career ==
Fitzgerald played college football for the Miami Hurricanes. He was medically redshirted in 1997, and was a four-year letterman from 1998 to 2001. The 2001 Hurricanes won the national championship. Fitzgerald played in 44 games, starting 15, during his college career, totaling 71 solo tackles, 48 assisted tackles, five interceptions, 24 pass breakups, three sacks, four forced fumbles, and one fumble recovery. He majored in liberal arts.

== Professional career ==
After going undrafted in the 2002 NFL draft, Fitzgerald signed with the Tampa Bay Buccaneers on April 22, 2002. In August 2002, he was pulled over for speeding and the police found out that there were warrants for Fitzgerald's arrest. However, the warrants turned out to be false as Fitzgerald's cousin had stolen his identity. Fitzgerald was released by the Buccaneers on August 25, 2002.

Fitzgerald was then signed by the Indianapolis Colts on August 28, 2002. He was released on September 1, 2002.

Fitzgerald was signed to the practice squad of the Dallas Cowboys on December 12, 2002. He became a free agent after the 2002 season, and re-signed with Dallas on January 8, 2003. He was later released on July 28, 2003.

On September 1, 2004, it was reported that Fitzgerald had been signed to the practice roster of the Winnipeg Blue Bombers of the Canadian Football League. He was later promoted to the active roster and dressed in five games for the Blue Bombers during the 2004 season, posting six tackles on defense and six special teams tackles. Fitzgerald was released on June 12, 2005.
