= Darrell McClover =

American football player (born 1981)

No. 57, 58, 98
- Position: Linebacker

Personal information
- Born: August 25, 1981 (age 45); Hollywood, Florida, U.S.
- Listed height: 6 ft 1 in (1.85 m)
- Listed weight: 226 lb (103 kg)

Career information
- High school: Coconut Creek (Coconut Creek, Florida)
- College: Miami (FL)
- NFL draft: 2004: 7th round, 213th overall pick

Career history
- New York Jets (2004–2005); Chicago Bears (2006–2009)

Awards and highlights
- BCS national champion (2001)

Career NFL statistics
- Total tackles: 42
- Forced fumbles: 1
- Stats at Pro Football Reference

Darrell McClover (born August 25, 1981) is an American former professional football player who was a linebacker in the National Football League (NFL). He was selected by the New York Jets in the seventh round of the 2004 NFL draft and also played for the Chicago Bears. He played college football for the Miami Hurricanes. While at Miami, McClover played alongside New Orleans Saints star Jonathan Vilma and Denver Broncos linebacker D.J. Williams.

== Professional career ==
=== NFL Combine ===
At the NFL Combine, McClover ran the 40-yard dash in 4.47 seconds. He had a vertical jump of 38 in (97 cm). He did the three-cone drill in 6.7 seconds. McClover did the 20 yard shuttle in 4.19 seconds. He did 26 bench press reps. He had a broad jump of 9 ft 11 in (3.02 m).

=== New York Jets ===
McClover was selected in the 2004 NFL Draft out of Miami by the New York Jets and played in all sixteen games in his rookie year, making 25 special teams tackles. He also made 2 special teams tackles in the post season in 2005 and was selected as a pro bowl alternate. In 2005, McClover was named starting weak side linebacker, but had a season ending ankle injury in the pre season which ended that season. McClover spent two seasons with the New York Jets from 2004 to 2006.

=== Chicago Bears ===
He was signed by the Chicago Bears in 2006. In Chicago, he was a standout in special teams, but saw limited action on defense. In 2006 against Tampa Bay, he recorded 8 special teams tackles. McClover has over 80 special teams tackles in his career and also has 2 blocked punts to his credit. He was a part of the 2007 NFC championship team and 2007 Super Bowl team. McClover spent a large part of the 2008 season on special teams. He blocked a punt against Carolina in week 2 and was the leading tackler until being put on injured reserve in week 10. He re-signed with the Bears in September 2009. His last game with the Bears was in January 2010 against the Detroit Lions. He finished his career as a Bear where he recorded 83 special teams tackles and 2 blocked punts and a forced fumble for his career.
