= Daryl Jones (American football) =

American football player (born 1979)

No. 87, 82
- Position: Wide receiver

Personal information
- Born: February 2, 1979 (age 47); Dallas, Texas, U.S.
- Listed height: 5 ft 9 in (1.75 m)
- Listed weight: 190 lb (86 kg)

Career information
- High school: Carter (Dallas)
- College: Miami (FL)
- NFL draft: 2002: 7th round, 226th overall pick

Career history
- New York Giants (2002); Chicago Bears (2003–2004); Minnesota Vikings (2005)

Awards and highlights
- BCS national champion (2001)

Career NFL statistics
- Receptions: 8
- Receiving yards: 90
- Return yards: 335
- Stats at Pro Football Reference

Daryl Lawrence Jones (born February 2, 1979) is an American former professional football player who was a wide receiver in the National Football League (NFL). He was selected by the New York Giants in the seventh round of the 2002 NFL draft. He played college football for the Miami Hurricanes. Jones later played for the Chicago Bears and the Minnesota Vikings.
