= Marcus Maxey =

American football player (born 1983)

No. 27, 45
- Position: Defensive back

Personal information
- Born: February 2, 1983 (age 43); Navasota, Texas, U.S.
- Listed height: 6 ft 0 in (1.83 m)
- Listed weight: 192 lb (87 kg)

Career information
- High school: Navasota
- College: Miami (FL)
- NFL draft: 2006: 5th round, 154th overall pick

Career history
- Kansas City Chiefs (2006); Chicago Bears (2006); Kansas City Chiefs (2006)

Awards and highlights
- BCS national champion (2001)
- Stats at Pro Football Reference

Marcus Jacolby Maxey (born February 2, 1983) is an American former professional football player who was a defensive back in the National Football League (NFL). He played college football for the Miami Hurricanes and was selected in the fifth round of the 2006 NFL draft. Maxey was waived by the Kansas City Chiefs earlier in the 2006 NFL season and spent a few weeks on the Chicago Bears' roster before returning to the Chiefs later that season. He was released by The Chiefs on August 23, 2007.

Pre-draft measurables
| Height | Weight | Arm length | Hand span | 40-yard dash | 10-yard split | 20-yard split | 20-yard shuttle | Three-cone drill | Vertical jump | Broad jump | Bench press |
|---|---|---|---|---|---|---|---|---|---|---|---|
| 6 ft 1 1/2 in (1.87 m) | 198 lb (90 kg) | 30 in (0.76 m) | 9 in (0.23 m) | 4.42 s | 1.57 s | 2.61 s | 4.23 s | 7.58 s | 41.5 in (1.05 m) | 10 ft 9 in (3.28 m) | 17 reps |
All values from NFL Combine/Pro Day
