= Santonio Thomas =

American football player (born 1981)

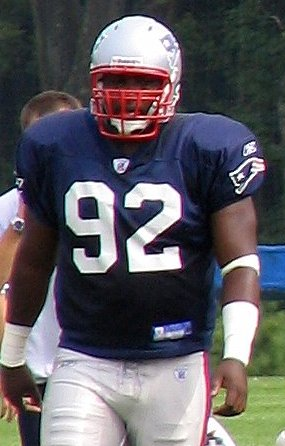

No. 92, 97
- Position: Defensive end

Personal information
- Born: July 2, 1981 (age 45); Belle Glade, Florida, U.S.
- Listed height: 6 ft 4 in (1.93 m)
- Listed weight: 305 lb (138 kg)

Career information
- College: Miami
- NFL draft: 2005: undrafted

Career history
- New England Patriots (2005–2007); Cleveland Browns (2008)

Awards and highlights
- BCS national champion (2001)

Career NFL statistics
- Total tackles: 16
- Sacks: 0.5
- Pass deflections: 2
- Stats at Pro Football Reference

Santonio Thomas (born July 2, 1981) is an American former professional football player who was a defensive end for the New England Patriots of the National Football League (NFL). He played college football for the Miami Hurricanes and signed as an undrafted free agent with the Patriots in 2005.

== Early life ==
Thomas attended Glades Central High School in Belle Glade, Florida, and was a student and a letterman in football. In football, as a senior he led his team to the Class 3A State Championship and was part of a team ranked #20 in the nation by USA Today. He was named as a first-team All-USA selection by USA Today. In the Class 3A State Championship Game, Thomas made 12 tackles and recovered a fumble and took it in for a touchdown.

== Professional career ==
=== New England Patriots ===
He joined the Patriots as an undrafted free agent after the 2005 NFL draft. He spent the 2005 and 2006 seasons on the Patriots' practice squad.

=== Cleveland Browns ===
Thomas was signed by the Cleveland Browns on September 16, 2008, after defensive end Robaire Smith was placed on injured reserve. He was waived on September 5, 2009.
