= Brett Romberg =

Canadian football player (born 1979)

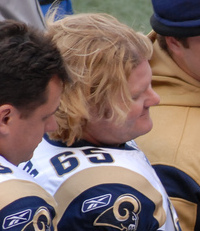
- Romberg (#65) in 2008

No. 65, 66
- Position: Center

Personal information
- Born: October 10, 1979 (age 47); Windsor, Ontario, Canada
- Listed height: 6 ft 2 in (1.88 m)
- Listed weight: 293 lb (133 kg)

Career information
- High school: Belle River (Belle River, Ontario)
- College: Miami (FL) (1999–2002)
- NFL draft: 2003: undrafted
- CFL draft: 2002: 2nd round, 17th overall pick

Career history
- Jacksonville Jaguars (2003–2005); St. Louis Rams (2006–2008); Atlanta Falcons (2009, 2011)

Awards and highlights
- BCS national champion (2001); Rimington Trophy (2002); Jim Parker Trophy (2002); Consensus All-American (2002); 2× First-team All-Big East (2001, 2002)

Career NFL statistics
- Games played: 44
- Games started: 18
- Stats at Pro Football Reference

Brett Christopher Romberg (born October 10, 1979) is a Canadian former professional football player who was a center in the National Football League (NFL). He played college football for the Miami Hurricanes, earned consensus All-American honors, and won the Rimington Trophy. He was signed by the Jacksonville Jaguars as an undrafted free agent in 2003, and also played for the St. Louis Rams and the Atlanta Falcons.

== Early life ==
Romberg was born in Windsor, Ontario, Canada. He started his football career in the ninth grade playing for the Belle River District High School football team.

== College career ==
Romberg attended the University of Miami in the United States, where he played for the Hurricanes from 1999 to 2002. As senior in 2002, he was distinguished as the best center in the nation when he was awarded the Dave Rimington Trophy and was recognized as a consensus first-team All-American at center.

With Romberg at center, the Hurricanes won 35 of 37 games, one BCS National Championship (2001), three Big East Conference championships (2000, 2001, 2002), a Sugar Bowl (2001) and a Rose Bowl (2002).

Romberg never allowed a quarterback sack at center except against Ohio State in the 2003 Fiesta Bowl and was part of an offensive line that helped produce three 1,000-yard rushers (James Jackson, Clinton Portis and Willis McGahee), a quarterback (Ken Dorsey) who set every major Hurricanes career passing record and an offense that averaged more than 465 yards per game for the balance of his three years as the starting center.

== Professional career ==
Romberg was selected by the BC Lions of the Canadian Football League in the 2002 CFL draft but didn't play there. After a stint with the Jacksonville Jaguars, Romberg became the starting center for the St. Louis Rams for a brief time in 2006 and 2007, replacing an injured Andy McCollum, but he was replaced in 2009 by Jason Brown. In 2009, Romberg was a reserve offensive lineman for the Atlanta Falcons. He was released by the Falcons on September 4, 2010.

Due to an injury to starting center Todd McClure, the Falcons re-signed Romberg on August 30, 2011. However, he was released during final cuts on September 3 to avoid a guaranteed contract, but was re-signed on September 12 where he remained on the active roster for the remainder of the 2011 season. Romberg finally retired from the National Football League in 2012.

Romberg was inducted into the University of Miami Sports Hall of Fame in March 2013 for his football accomplishments. He hosted a morning sports show in South Florida (Zaslow/Romberg/Amber show), where he was well known for his impressions of Goran Dragic, and his segments Romdog's Grill and Shout Outs. He left the show in July 2019.
