= Phillip Buchanon =

American football player (born 1980)

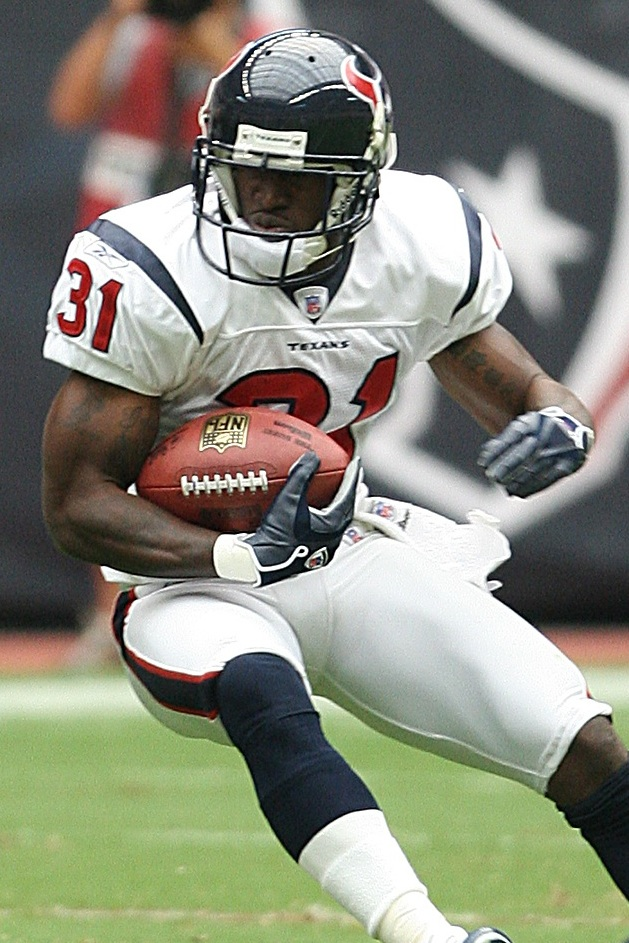
- Buchanon with the Houston Texans in 2006

No. 31
- Position: Cornerback

Personal information
- Born: September 19, 1980 (age 46); Fort Myers, Florida, U.S.
- Listed height: 5 ft 11 in (1.80 m)
- Listed weight: 192 lb (87 kg)

Career information
- High school: Lehigh (Lehigh Acres, Florida)
- College: Miami (FL)
- NFL draft: 2002: 1st round, 17th overall pick

Career history
- Oakland Raiders (2002–2004); Houston Texans (2005–2006); Tampa Bay Buccaneers (2006–2008); Detroit Lions (2009); Washington Redskins (2010–2011)

Awards and highlights
- BCS national champion (2001); Second-team All-American (2001); Big East Special Teams Player of the Year (2001); First-team All-Big East (2001)

Career NFL statistics
- Total tackles: 390
- Forced fumbles: 8
- Pass deflections: 73
- Interceptions: 20
- Return yards: 1,222
- Total touchdowns: 8
- Stats at Pro Football Reference

Phillip Darren Buchanon (born September 19, 1980) is an American former professional football player who was a cornerback who played in the National Football League (NFL). He played college football at the University of Miami, and was selected by the Oakland Raiders in the first round of the 2002 NFL draft. Buchanon also played for the Houston Texans, Tampa Bay Buccaneers, Detroit Lions, and Washington Redskins before retiring after the 2011 season.

== Early life ==
Buchanon played high school football at Lehigh Senior High School in Lehigh Acres, Florida where he started at both running back and defensive back. During his senior year, he earned an All-State selection. He finished his career with 102 tackles and seven interceptions. He also lettered in basketball, track, and baseball.

Buchanon was also on the school's track & field team, where he was a standout sprinter for three seasons. He posted personal bests of 10.5 seconds in the 100 meters and 21.8 in the 200 meters, and was also timed at 4.3 seconds in the 40-yard dash. He joined the Hurricanes' track team in 2001, and won the 60 meters at the Meyo Invitational, recording a career-best time of 6.79 seconds.

== College career ==
Buchanon played college football at the University of Miami. During his junior year, he earned All-American honors as a returner and was a finalist for the Mosi Tatupu Award. He finished his career with 88 tackles and seven interceptions on defense, and 32 punt returns for 477 yards and two touchdowns as a returner.

At the NFL Combine he ran a 4.31 40-yard dash, tied for the fastest time in 2002.

== Professional career ==
=== Oakland Raiders ===
Buchanon was drafted by the Oakland Raiders 17th overall in the 2002 NFL draft. He spent three seasons with the Raiders recording 122 tackles and 11 interceptions.

=== Houston Texans ===
On April 25, 2005, the Raiders traded Buchanon to the Houston Texans for a second and third round pick in the 2005 NFL draft. He spent two years in Houston playing in 14 games, recording 37 tackles. He played four games for the Texans in 2006 before being released on October 16, 2006.

=== Tampa Bay Buccaneers ===
Buchanon signed with the Tampa Bay Buccaneers on October 17, 2006. He finished the 2006 season with the Buccaneers recording 24 tackles and intercepting two passes. During 2007, he took over as the Buccaneers starting cornerback alongside Ronde Barber due to Brian Kelly's struggles with injury.

=== Detroit Lions ===
Buchanon was signed by the Detroit Lions on March 4, 2009, to help the secondary after the 2008 season. He played in 13 games for the Lions recording 43 tackles, a sack, and 4 passes defended. He was released on March 4, 2010.

=== Washington Redskins ===
Buchanon signed with the Washington Redskins on March 29, 2010. After re-signing with the Redskins for the 2011 season, Buchanon was suspended by the team for four games for violating the NFL's performance-enhancing drug policy. After his suspension ended, Buchanon was added to 53-man roster after rookie Brandyn Thompson was waived and added to the Redskins' practice squad. On November 5, 2011, Buchanon was placed on injured reserve having played in only one game the entire season in Week 7 against the Carolina Panthers.

== NFL career statistics ==
Year	Team	GP	Comb	Solo	Ast	Sack	FF	FR	Yds	Int	Yds	Avg	Lng	TD	PD
2002	OAK	6	21	21	0	0.0	0	0	0	2	81	41	81	1	5
2003	OAK	16	42	40	2	0.0	2	0	0	6	176	29	83	2	10
2004	OAK	14	59	50	9	0.0	0	1	0	3	69	23	37	1	9
2005	HOU	10	35	29	6	0.0	0	0	0	0	0	0	0	0	4
2006	HOU	4	2	2	0	0.0	0	0	0	0	0	0	0	0	1
2006	TB	10	24	20	4	0.0	0	1	0	2	0	0	0	0	7
2007	TB	16	61	59	2	0.0	1	0	0	3	22	7	19	0	10
2008	TB	16	52	48	4	0.0	1	1	0	2	33	17	26	1	6
2009	DET	13	43	38	5	1.0	2	0	0	0	0	0	0	0	4
2010	WAS	16	49	41	8	0.0	2	1	0	2	51	26	43	0	18
2011	WAS	1	0	0	0	0	0	0	0	0	0	0	0	0	0
Career		122	388	348	40	1.0	8	4	0	20	432	22	83	5	74

== Personal life ==
Buchanon is the cousin of former Tennessee Titans defensive end Jevon Kearse.

He was offered a $500,000 contract by the Cincinnati Reds to play baseball but ultimately decided to play football instead.

In Buchanon's book New Money: Staying Rich (2015, Two Harbors Press) he describes the money troubles common among young athletes who come into sudden wealth. Among other anecdotes he describes how his mother demanded a million dollars from him as compensation for raising him, after he was drafted by the Oakland Raiders with a $4.9 million signing bonus. He refused to pay the cash to her, noting among other objections: "If you do the math, one million dollars divided by 18 years of raising me was approximately $55,555.55 a year in restitution," an amount he considered excessive. He instead bought her an upscale home to occupy and paid the house's mortgage and maintenance costs; she used his childhood home as a rental property. After seven years he realized the new home's upkeep was more than he could afford, and Buchanon offered his mother a choice: he would either pay her a lump-sum, or buy a smaller house outright with no mortgage for her and his younger siblings to occupy. He reported that she took the cash and moved back to his childhood home, only to eventually lose it to foreclosure.

In 2016, Buchanon launched a board game, New Money: Staying Rich, designed to teach principles of financial literacy and management.
