= Derrick Knight =

British film director and producer

Derrick Knight (3 February 1929 – 28 December 2022) was a British film director and producer.

== Early life ==
Derrick Knight was born in Dorset on 3 February 1929 to Ninette (née Mollard) and Robert Knight. He was educated at Canford School and afterwards attended Oriel College, Oxford, where he was a part of the university film society.

== Career ==
Knight directed the 1966 film Traveling for a Living about the English folk group The Watersons.

== Personal life ==
In 1959, he married Brenda Henderson. Knight died on 28 December 2022, at the age of 93.
