= Matt Walters =

American football player (born 1979)

No. 95
- Position: Defensive end

Personal information
- Born: August 22, 1979 (age 47); Melbourne, Florida, U.S.
- Listed height: 6 ft 5 in (1.96 m)
- Listed weight: 272 lb (123 kg)

Career information
- High school: Eau Gallie (FL)
- College: Miami (FL)
- NFL draft: 2003: 5th round, 150th overall pick

Career history
- New York Jets (2003); Miami Dolphins (2005)*; Cologne Centurions (2005)
- * Offseason or practice squad member only

Awards and highlights
- BCS national champion (2001)

Career NFL statistics
- Games played: 11
- Stats at Pro Football Reference

Matthew Jeremy Walters (born August 22, 1979) is an American former professional football player who was a defensive end for the New York Jets of the National Football League (NFL).

== Football career ==
While at Eau Gallie High School, Walters lettered in three sports, including golf and basketball. Scouted by Baylor University as well as the universities of Florida and Virginia, he chose the University of Miami. Majoring in mechanical engineering at "The U", Walters distinguished himself academically, being named a 2002 First-team Verizon Academic All-American as well as winning the 2002 Big East Football Scholar-Athlete Award.

Walters was selected in the fifth round of the 2003 NFL draft (150th overall) by the New York Jets. Walters is currently pursuing a career as an amateur triathlete training under his coach, Ed Donner.

== Personal life ==
Walters' nephew, Andrew Walters, plays in Major League Baseball for the Cleveland Guardians.
