= James Lewis (American football) =

American football player (born 1978)

No. 23
- Position: Defensive back

Personal information
- Born: December 19, 1978 (age 47); Piscataway, New Jersey, U.S.
- Listed height: 5 ft 11 in (1.80 m)
- Listed weight: 196 lb (89 kg)

Career information
- High school: Piscataway
- College: Miami (FL) (1998–2001)
- NFL draft: 2002: 6th round, 183rd overall pick

Career history
- Indianapolis Colts (2002)*; Cleveland Browns (2002)*; Detroit Lions (2002–2003)*; Barcelona Dragons (2003); Scottish Claymores (2004)
- * Offseason or practice squad member only

Awards and highlights
- BCS national champion (2001)

James Christopher Lewis Jr. (born December 19, 1978) is an American former football defensive back who played college football at the University of Miami. He was selected by the Indianapolis Colts in the sixth round of the 2002 NFL draft.

== College career ==
After playing high school football at Piscataway Township High School, a high school in Piscataway, New Jersey, Lewis went to play college football for four years for the University of Miami from 1998 to 2001. During the 2nd quarter of his final game as a Hurricane, the 2002 Rose Bowl against Nebraska, he scored a pick six when he ran 42 yards with an intercepted pass from Heisman Trophy-winning quarterback Eric Crouch for a touchdown—which increased the score for Miami, 20–0. Miami would win the bowl game 37–14, and afterwards were considered consensus national champions.

== Professional career ==
Lewis graduated after his senior season and was selected by the Indianapolis Colts in the sixth round, with the 183rd overall pick, of the 2002 NFL draft. Although signed by the Colts, he did not make the final roster.
