= Jamaal Green =

American football player (born 1980)

No. 65, 67
- Position: Defensive end

Personal information
- Born: June 5, 1980 (age 46); Camden, New Jersey, U.S.
- Listed height: 6 ft 2 in (1.88 m)
- Listed weight: 272 lb (123 kg)

Career information
- High school: Woodrow Wilson (Camden)
- College: Miami (FL) (1998–2002)
- NFL draft: 2003: 4th round, 131st overall pick

Career history
- Philadelphia Eagles (2003–2004); Chicago Bears (2005–2006); Washington Redskins (2006–2007)*
- * Offseason or practice squad member only

Awards and highlights
- BCS national champion (2001); Second-team All-Big East (2002)

Career NFL statistics
- Total tackles: 2
- Sacks: 1
- Stats at Pro Football Reference

Jamaal Hakeem Green (born June 5, 1980) is an American former professional football player who was a defensive end for the Philadelphia Eagles and Chicago Bears of the National Football League (NFL). Green played college football for the Miami Hurricanes. He was selected by the Eagles in the fourth round of the 2003 NFL draft.

== Early life ==
Raised in Camden, New Jersey, Green attended Woodrow Wilson High School. He first played organized football during his junior year. He recorded 98 tackles (65 of which were solo), 13 sacks, four forced fumbles and four fumble recoveries his senior season, earning first-team All-State honors.

== College career ==
Green played college football for the Miami Hurricanes from 1998 to 2002. He was redshirted in 1998. He majored in liberal arts at Miami. Green totaled 47 tackles and six sacks in 2001, helping Miami win the national championship. He accumulated 49 tackles (28 solo) and nine sacks in 2002, garnering second-team All-Big East Conference recognition.

== Professional career ==
=== Philadelphia Eagles ===
Green was selected by the Philadelphia Eagles in the fourth round, with the 131st overall pick, of the 2003 NFL draft. He officially signed with the team on May 30, 2003. He was placed on injured reserve on August 25, 2003. He played in eight games for the Eagles in 2004, recording two solo tackles and one sack.

Green was waived/injured on September 3, 2005, and reverted to injured reserve on September 4. He was waived on September 8, 2005.

=== Chicago Bears ===
Green was signed to the practice squad of the Chicago Bears on October 19, 2005. He was promoted to the active roster on January 10, 2006, and played in one playoff game but recorded no statistics. He was waived by the Bears on September 2, 2006, and signed to the team's practice squad on September 4. He was released on September 12, 2006.

=== Washington Redskins ===
Green was signed to the practice squad of the Washington Redskins December 6, 2006. He signed a reserve/future contract with the Redskins on January 5, 2007. He was waived on August 28, 2007.

== Post-football career ==
On February 17, 2008, Green became a United States Border Patrol agent in the El Paso area.
