= Maarefi =

Maarefi معارفي
- Village
- Location within Iran
- Coordinates: 34°01′13″N 46°44′47″E
- Country: Iran
- Province: Kermanshah
- County: Eslamabad-e Gharb
- Bakhsh: Central
- Rural District: Shiyan

Population (2006)
  - Total: 314
- Time zone: UTC+3:30 (IRST)
  - Summer (DST): UTC+4:30 (IRDT)

Maarefi (Persian: معارفي, also Romanized as Ma‘ārefī and Mo‘ārefī; also known as Mārfi, Mo‘ārefī Shīān, and Mo‘arefī-ye Sheyān) is a village in Shiyan Rural District, in the Central District of Eslamabad-e Gharb County, Kermanshah Province, Iran. At the 2006 census, its population was 314, in 64 families.
