= Mike Rumph =

American football player and coach (born 1979)

Miami Hurricanes
- Title: Director of recruiting/On-campus experience

Personal information
- Born: November 8, 1979 (age 46); Delray Beach, Florida, U.S.
- Listed height: 6 ft 2 in (1.88 m)
- Listed weight: 205 lb (93 kg)

Career information
- High school: Atlantic (Delray Beach)
- College: Miami (FL)
- NFL draft: 2002: 1st round, 27th overall pick

Career history

Playing
- San Francisco 49ers (2002–2005); Washington Redskins (2006); St. Louis Rams (2007)*
- * Offseason or practice squad member only

Coaching
- American Heritage High School (2011–2012) Defensive coordinator; American Heritage High School (2013–2015) Head coach; Miami (FL) (2016–2020) Cornerbacks coach; Miami (FL) (2021) Assistant director of recruiting; Miami (FL) (2022–present) Director of recruiting/On-campus experience

Awards and highlights
- BCS national champion (2001); 2× All-Big East (2000, 2001)

Career NFL statistics
- Total tackles: 141
- Sacks: 2
- Forced fumbles: 2
- Pass deflections: 18
- Interceptions: 3
- Stats at Pro Football Reference

Michael Jamaine Rumph (born November 8, 1979) is an American former professional football player who was a safety and cornerback in the National Football League (NFL). He played college football for the Miami Hurricanes. He is currently the director of recruiting for the Hurricanes football team.

== Early life and college ==
Rumph attended Atlantic Community High School in Delray Beach, Florida. He was among the SuperPrep National Top 50 players and was a SuperPrep All-American. As a senior, he gained 519 yards rushing and receiving with five touchdowns and totaled 108 tackles and snagged six interceptions for 172 yards. He was also a statewide track star in triple jump and long jump.

Rumph was a quiet but productive player during his career at the University of Miami which culminated with a national championship in his senior year. Rumph compiled 117 tackles (117 solo), 2 forced fumbles, and 6 interceptions (returning one for a touchdown) during his time at Miami. He was a second-team Big East selection his sophomore and senior years and a first-team selection his junior year.

== Professional career ==
=== San Francisco 49ers ===
Rumph was selected by the San Francisco 49ers in the first round of the 2002 NFL draft, with the 27th overall selection. He was originally a cornerback, but the 49ers switched him to safety due to a combination of his strong tackling ability and poor man-to-man coverage skills. He missed large parts of the 2004 and 2005 seasons due to injuries.

=== Washington Redskins ===
On August 14, 2006, Rumph was traded to the Redskins for wide receiver Taylor Jacobs. On December 27, 2006, the Redskins waived him.

=== St. Louis Rams ===
Rumph was signed to the St. Louis Rams on March 20, 2007, but was released on August 3, 2007. He retired in July 2008.

== NFL career statistics ==
Legend
**Bold**	Career high

=== Regular season ===
Year	Team	Games		Tackles					Interceptions					Fumbles			
Year	Team	GP	GS	Cmb	Solo	Ast	Sck	TFL	Int	Yds	TD	Lng	PD	FF	FR	Yds	TD
2002	SFO	**16**	1	50	45	5	0.0	3	0	0	0	0	**7**	0	0	0	0
2003	SFO	15	**13**	**63**	**54**	**9**	**2.0**	**4**	**3**	**19**	0	**12**	**7**	**1**	0	0	0
2004	SFO	2	2	5	4	1	0.0	0	0	0	0	0	0	0	0	0	0
2005	SFO	3	3	12	12	0	0.0	0	0	0	0	0	0	**1**	0	0	0
2006	WAS	7	0	11	9	2	0.0	0	0	0	0	0	4	0	0	0	0
		43	19	141	124	17	2.0	7	3	19	0	12	18	2	0	0	0

=== Playoffs ===
Year	Team	Games		Tackles					Interceptions					Fumbles			
Year	Team	GP	GS	Cmb	Solo	Ast	Sck	TFL	Int	Yds	TD	Lng	PD	FF	FR	Yds	TD
2002	SFO	**2**	**2**	**13**	**10**	**3**	0.0	0	0	0	0	0	0	0	0	0	0
		2	2	13	10	3	0.0	0	0	0	0	0	0	0	0	0	0

== Post-NFL career ==
In 2010, Rumph became an assistant coach for the Miramar Everglades, and then, for a brief time served as coach at the Miami Carol City Senior High School. Following that, he served as head coach of the American Heritage High School's varsity football team in Plantation, Florida until 2015. Prior to his departure from AHHS, Rumph had substituted a former Miami Dolphins player and coach Jeff Dellenbach in 2013. Afterward, he accepted a job on Mark Richt's staff at the University of Miami as the cornerbacks coach.

== Personal life ==
Rumph and his wife Veronica used to operate a puppy store. Mike and Veronica have two children, Jalen and Sienna.
