= Jerome McDougle =

American football player (born 1978)

No. 95
- Position: Defensive end

Personal information
- Born: December 15, 1978 (age 47); Pompano Beach, Florida, U.S.
- Listed height: 6 ft 2 in (1.88 m)
- Listed weight: 264 lb (120 kg)

Career information
- High school: Blanche Ely (Pompano Beach, Florida)
- College: Miami (FL)
- NFL draft: 2003: 1st round, 15th overall pick

Career history
- Philadelphia Eagles (2003–2007); New York Giants (2008)

Awards and highlights
- BCS national champion (2001); First-team All-American (2002); Third-team All-American (2001); First-team All-Big East (2001)

Career NFL statistics
- Total tackles: 37
- Sacks: 3
- Forced fumbles: 2
- Stats at Pro Football Reference

Jerome McDougle (born December 15, 1978) is an American former professional football player who was a defensive end in the National Football League (NFL). He was selected by the Philadelphia Eagles 15th overall in the 2003 NFL draft. McDougle played college football at the University of Miami. He also played in the NFL for the New York Giants.

== College career ==
McDougle was a standout defensive player at the University of Miami. Among his collegiate accomplishments, he helped lead the University of Miami to its 12–0 national championship season in 2001.

== Professional career ==
Pre-draft measurables
Height	Weight	Arm length	Hand span	40-yard dash	10-yard split	20-yard split	20-yard shuttle	Three-cone drill	Vertical jump	Broad jump
6 ft 2 in (1.88 m)	264 lb (120 kg)	31 3/8 in (0.80 m)	10 in (0.25 m)	4.70 s	1.61 s	2.76 s	4.58 s	7.28 s	34 in (0.86 m)	9 ft 9 in (2.97 m)
All values from NFL Combine.

=== Philadelphia Eagles ===
McDougle was selected by the Philadelphia Eagles with the 15th overall selection in the first round of the 2003 NFL draft. The Eagles traded up 15 spots to obtain McDougle, making him the first University of Miami player to be drafted by the Eagles since Jerome Brown, whose promising NFL career was cut short by a fatal 1992 car accident.

With the Eagles, McDougle was plagued by injuries. In the final 2003 pre-season game, he sustained ankle, knee and hip injuries during a game against the New York Jets, forcing him to miss eight games of the 2003 season. During the 2004 season, he was diagnosed with an irregular heartbeat, and later he suffered a knee sprain in a game against the Dallas Cowboys, missing five games during the season.

During the 2005 offseason, McDougle was shot during an armed robbery of his home. Complications from the shooting and surgery left him out for the entire 2005 season. McDougle fully recovered and joined the Eagles at their 2006 training camp practices. He performed well in pre-season outings, recording an impressive sack of former collegiate teammate Ken Dorsey in the Eagles' pre-season game against the Cleveland Browns. On August 15, however, Eagles coach Andy Reid announced that McDougle had sustained fractures to two ribs in pre-season practices and would require approximately three weeks for recuperation. He was reactivated in September 2006.

McDougle's pass rushing and run defense capabilities were expected to be an important part of the 2006 Eagles defense, which featured high levels of substitutions of defensive linemen in situational-oriented defenses. McDougle's actions on the field proved costly to the Eagles during a controversial Eagles 23–21 loss to the Tampa Bay Buccaneers on October 22, 2006. In the fourth quarter of a closely contested game played in 105-degree Tampa Bay heat, McDougle closed in on Buccaneer quarterback Bruce Gradkowski, dropping him for a nine-yard loss in a critical quarterback sack. As McDougle brought Gradkowski to the ground at Raymond James Stadium, however, he appeared to grab Gradkowski's face mask, resulting in a 15-yard intentional face-masking penalty against the Eagles. The 15-yard nature of the penalty was questionable, with replays showing that McDougle's grasp of Gradkowski's face mask appeared unintentional, which, if true, should have resulted in only a five-yard penalty.

Seeing that he had been penalized 15 yards, McDougle kicked the referee's flag in anger, resulting in an additional 15-yard unsportsmanlike conduct penalty, for a total of 30 yards in penalties. The two penalties incurred by McDougle greatly enhanced the Buccaneers' field position, leading to a Buccaneers field goal, which proved the difference in the game's outcome, which ultimately was won by Tampa Bay on a 62-yard Buccaneers' field goal (the third longest in NFL history) as time expired.

In 2007, McDougle was again injured, tearing his triceps, this time in the Eagles' pre-season opener against the Baltimore Ravens; he did not return during the 2007 season. On August 30, 2008, the Eagles released him during final cuts, ending a high-expectations tenure with the Eagles plagued by injuries and disappointments.

=== New York Giants ===
A day after being released from the Eagles, McDougle was signed by the New York Giants on August 31, 2008. He became a free agent after the season, and was not signed by another team.

=== NFL statistics ===
Year	Team	GP	COMB	TOTAL	AST	SACK	FF	FR	FR YDS	INT	IR YDS	AVG IR	LNG	TD	PD
2003	PHI	8	9	5	4	0.0	1	0	0	0	0	0	0	0	1
2004	PHI	11	13	13	0	2.0	1	0	0	0	0	0	0	0	1
2006	PHI	14	13	11	2	1.0	0	0	0	0	0	0	0	0	2
2008	NYG	4	2	1	1	0.0	0	0	0	0	0	0	0	0	1
Career		37	37	30	7	3.0	2	0	0	0	0	0	0	0	5

== Personal life ==
He is the younger brother of NFL offensive lineman Stockar McDougle. On July 28, 2005, just four days before McDougle was scheduled to arrive for the Eagles 2005 training camp in Bethlehem, Pennsylvania, he was shot in the abdomen during a robbery in Miami, Florida. Following the shooting, McDougle was flown by helicopter to Miami's Jackson Memorial Hospital, where he underwent emergency surgery by Dr. David Shatz, a trauma surgeon at the University of Miami.
