= Martin Bibla =

American gridiron football player (born 1979)

No. 64, 66, 55, 77
- Position: Guard

Personal information
- Born: October 4, 1979 (age 47); Belleville, New Jersey, U.S.
- Listed height: 6 ft 3 in (1.91 m)
- Listed weight: 306 lb (139 kg)

Career information
- High school: Crestwood (Mountain Top, Pennsylvania)
- College: Miami (FL)
- NFL draft: 2002: 4th round, 116th overall pick

Career history
- Atlanta Falcons (2002–2005); Denver Broncos (2006)*; Philadelphia Soul (2007–2008); BC Lions (2009)*; Las Vegas Locomotives (2009); Omaha Nighthawks (2010)*; Sacramento Mountain Lions (2010)
- * Offseason or practice squad member only

Awards and highlights
- UFL champion (2009); ArenaBowl champion (2008); First-team All-Arena (2008); AFL All-Rookie Team (2007); BCS national champion (2001); Third-team All-American (2001); First-team All-Big East (2001)

Career NFL statistics
- Games played: 31
- Games started: 2
- Stats at Pro Football Reference
- Stats at ArenaFan.com

Martin John Bibla (born October 4, 1979) is an American former professional football player who was a guard in the National Football League (NFL). He played college football for the Miami Hurricanes and was selected by the Atlanta Falcons in the fourth round of the 2002 NFL draft.

Bibla was also a member of the Denver Broncos, Philadelphia Soul, BC Lions, Las Vegas Locomotives, Omaha Nighthawks, and Sacramento Mountain Lions.

== Early life ==
Bibla started his football career on the line at Crestwood High School in Pennsylvania, graduating in 1997.

== Professional career ==
=== Atlanta Falcons ===
Bibla was drafted 116th overall by the Atlanta Falcons in the fourth round of the 2002 NFL draft, and played for the Falcons until being released in August 2005.

=== Denver Broncos ===
Bibla was signed by the Denver Broncos in January 2006 but was released.

=== Philadelphia Soul ===
He played two seasons for the Philadelphia Soul before the Arena Football League cancelled the 2009 season.

=== BC Lions ===
Bibla was signed by the BC Lions of the Canadian Football League on April 28, 2009. He left the team after one practice and was cut on June 25, 2009.

=== Las Vegas Locomotives ===
Bibla was signed by the Las Vegas Locomotives of the United Football League on August 31, 2009.
