= James Jackson (American football) =

American football player (born 1976)

No. 21
- Position: Running back

Personal information
- Born: August 4, 1976 (age 50); Belle Glade, Florida, U.S.
- Listed height: 5 ft 10 in (1.78 m)
- Listed weight: 215 lb (98 kg)

Career information
- High school: Glades Central (Belle Glade)
- College: Miami (FL)
- NFL draft: 2001: 3rd round, 65th overall pick

Career history
- Cleveland Browns (2001–2004); Green Bay Packers (2004); Arizona Cardinals (2005)

Career NFL statistics
- Rushing yards: 1,082
- Rushing average: 3.3
- Rushing touchdown: 5
- Stats at Pro Football Reference

James Shurrade Jackson (born August 4, 1976) is an American former professional football player who was a running back in the National Football League (NFL). He was selected by the Cleveland Browns in the third round of the 2001 NFL draft. He played for the Browns, Green Bay Packers, and Arizona Cardinals.

Jackson played collegiate football at the University of Miami.

== NFL career statistics ==
Pre-draft measurables
Height	Weight	Arm length	Hand span	40-yard dash	10-yard split	20-yard split	Vertical jump
5 ft 10 3/8 in (1.79 m)	210 lb (95 kg)	31 in (0.79 m)	9 1/2 in (0.24 m)	4.55 s	1.62 s	2.58 s	35.0 in (0.89 m)
All values from NFL Combine

Legend
**Bold**	Career high

=== Regular season ===
Year	Team	Games		Rushing					Receiving				
Year	Team	GP	GS	Att	Yds	Avg	Lng	TD	Rec	Yds	Avg	Lng	TD
2001	CLE	11	**10**	**195**	**554**	2.8	22	2	7	56	8.0	16	0
2002	CLE	**16**	0	12	54	4.5	18	0	3	9	3.0	5	0
2003	CLE	12	6	102	382	3.7	18	**3**	**14**	**114**	8.1	18	0
2004	CLE	4	0	12	81	**6.8**	**38**	0	6	22	3.7	13	0
2004	GNB	1	0	0	0	0.0	0	0	0	0	0.0	0	0
2005	ARI	8	0	4	11	2.8	3	0	2	31	**15.5**	**19**	0
Career		52	16	325	1,082	3.3	38	5	32	232	7.3	19	0

=== Playoffs ===
Year	Team	Games		Rushing					Receiving				
Year	Team	GP	GS	Att	Yds	Avg	Lng	TD	Rec	Yds	Avg	Lng	TD
2002	CLE	**1**	0	0	0	0.0	0	0	0	0	0.0	0	0
Career		1	0	0	0	0.0	0	0	0	0	0.0	0	0
