= Sherko Moarefi =

Iranian Kurdish activist

- Born: 1980; Baneh, Iran
- Died: November 4, 2013 (aged 32–33); Saghez Prison, Iran
- Citizenship: Iran
- Occupation: Political activist
- Years active: 2008–2013
- Organization: Komala Party of Iranian Kurdistan
- Known for: Kurdish activism, Political dissidence
- Movement: Kurdish rights activism
- Criminal charges: Moharebeh, acting against national security
- Criminal penalty: Death by hanging
- Criminal status: Executed

Sherko Moarefi (1980–November 4, 2013) was a Kurdish activist and political prisoner who was executed in Saghez prison in Iran. Moarefi was arrested by Iranian authorities in 2008, convicted on two political charges, and executed in 2013.

== Sentence and execution ==
Moarefi was a Kurdish activist from Baneh in northwestern Iran. He was arrested in October 2008 on charges on membership in Komalah, a left-wing Kurdish opposition party that is banned by Iran. Moarefi was convicted by an Iran court and sentenced to death on vague charges of moharebeh ("waging war against God") and "acting against the national security," offenses frequently used by Iranian authorities against political dissidents.

Amnesty International and Human Rights Watch unsuccessfully called for Iran to commute Moarefi's sentence.

In a request for clemency for their son, Moarefi's parents wrote:

That is why we, as those close to Shirkooh Moarefi, are asking all international and human rights bodies to while defending the primary and elementary rights of a political prisoner, start negotiating with the Islamic Republic government on the matter of Shirkooh’s execution and convince the officials of this government that claim to be religious for this not to happen.

We, members of Moarefi Family, believe that if Shirkooh has done acts that are crimes against Islamic Republic laws, the same Islamic Laws should be considered to give an opportunity for him to live again.

And last but not least, capital punishment, based on the Islamic punishment laws in Iran, is the most severe punishment by the judiciary, but kindness is also one of the most prominent characteristics of all God’s religions, especially Islam. We expect the youth of this land to be judged by the same kindness. Is this too much to ask for by an old father and a heart-broken mother?

In 2011, one of Moarefi's lawyers stated that his conviction had been upheld by the Supreme Court of Iran and that he was in danger of execution at any time. Neither Moarefi nor his lawyers received advance warning of his execution. He was executed by hanging on November 4, 2013.
