= Todd Sievers =

American football player (born 1980)

No. 16
- Position: Placekicker

Personal information
- Born: April 1, 1980 (age 46); Ankeny, Iowa, U.S.
- Listed height: 6 ft 3 in (1.91 m)
- Listed weight: 215 lb (98 kg)

Career information
- College: Miami (FL)
- NFL draft: 2003: undrafted

Career history
- Houston Texans (2003–2004)*; Austin Wranglers (2005–2006); Dallas Desperados (2007)
- * Offseason or practice squad member only

Awards and highlights
- BCS national champion (2001); First-team All-American (2001); 2× All-Big East (2001, 2002)

Career AFL statistics
- Field goals made: 30
- Field goals attempted: 55
- Extra points made: 256
- Extra points attempted: 281
- Tackles: 9
- Stats at ArenaFan.com

Todd Michael Sievers (born April 1, 1980) is an American former football player. He played college football for the Miami Hurricanes from 1998 to 2002, being part of the 2001 Division I-A National Championship team.

He was also a member of the Houston Texans of the National Football League (NFL) during the 2003 and 2004 offseasons.

== High school career ==
Sievers played at Ankeny High School in Ankeny, Iowa, serving as the team's kicker and punter. He set state records with a 63-yard field goal, as well as in scoring with 77 points.

He also lettered in baseball and soccer.

== College career ==
=== 1998 ===
Sievers served as kickoff specialist as a true freshman. He played in 11 of 12 games that season (missed game against Temple due to death of grandfather). 14 of his 61 kickoffs went for touchbacks.

=== 1999 ===
Sievers was redshirted prior to his second season.

=== 2000 ===
Following two seasons without any field goal attempts, Sievers went 11-of-17 on field goals and 52-of-58 on extra points while leading the team in scoring with 85. Kicked two 50-yard extra points against Boston College and Florida, due to multiple unsportsmanlike conduct penalties. He suffered two concussions while making tackles on kickoffs, in games against McNeese State and Syracuse. He was diagnosed with diabetes during the season.

=== 2001 ===
Sievers led the nation in field goals per game with 1.91, making 21-of-26 field goals for the season. He set a university record for scoring in a season with 119. Kicked a (then) career-best 48-yard field goal against Syracuse. In a win over Boston College on November 10, he made four field goals and a potential game-saving tackle on a kickoff return. He was named the Big East special teams player of the week for his efforts.

Went 1-of-2 in field goals against Nebraska during the Rose Bowl. Miami went on to win 37–14, finishing the season 11–0 and being named National champions.

Along with the National championship, Sievers was named First-team All-American, First-team All-Big East, and finished 4th for the Lou Groza Award.

=== 2002 ===
Sievers kicked 13-of-22 in field goals, while leading the nation with 66 successful extra points (out of 69 attempts). His 105 points rank 5th in Miami Hurricanes school history among kickers. Kicked a career-high 53-yard field goal against Florida; also attempted a career-high 57-yard field goal (unsuccessfully) against Florida A&M.

Sievers played a key role in the 2003 Fiesta Bowl against Ohio State, kicking a 40-yard field goal, preceded by two icings by OSU head coach Jim Tressel, to end regulation and force the game to overtime. Miami would go on to lose in the 2nd overtime 31–24, thus ending Sievers' college football career.

He would be named First-team All-Big East for the 2nd consecutive year, along with being named a finalist for the Mosi Tatupu Award.

== Professional career ==
=== Houston Texans ===
Following his college career, Sievers was signed by the Houston Texans of the National Football League as an undrafted free agent May 5, 2003, competing against veteran Kris Brown. The Texans waived him on August 26.

He would be re-signed by the team for the following season's training camp, but the result was the same as he was released August 30, 2004.

=== Austin Wranglers ===
Sievers signed with the Austin Wranglers of the Arena Football League for the 2005 season. He went 8-of-17 on field goals and 51-of-57 on extra points, as well as making three tackles on the season.

In 2006, Sievers posted better numbers, going 14-of-25 on field goals and 90-of-105 on extra points. He also made four tackles and threw one pass during the season.

=== Dallas Desperados ===
In 2007, Sievers left Austin for the Dallas Desperados (also of the AFL). He wasn't needed as much for field goals, only going 8-of-13; he would set career highs in both extra points made (115) and attempted (119).

He left the Desperados after one season and hasn't played since.

== Post-football Life ==
Sievers is a Sales Manager for Ben E Keith Beverages and also serves as a spokesperson for the cause of diabetes research.

== Personal life ==
Sievers majored in marketing while at the University of Miami. He is the son of Don and Pat Sievers. Married to Toni Sievers.
