= D. J. Williams (linebacker) =

American football player (born 1982)

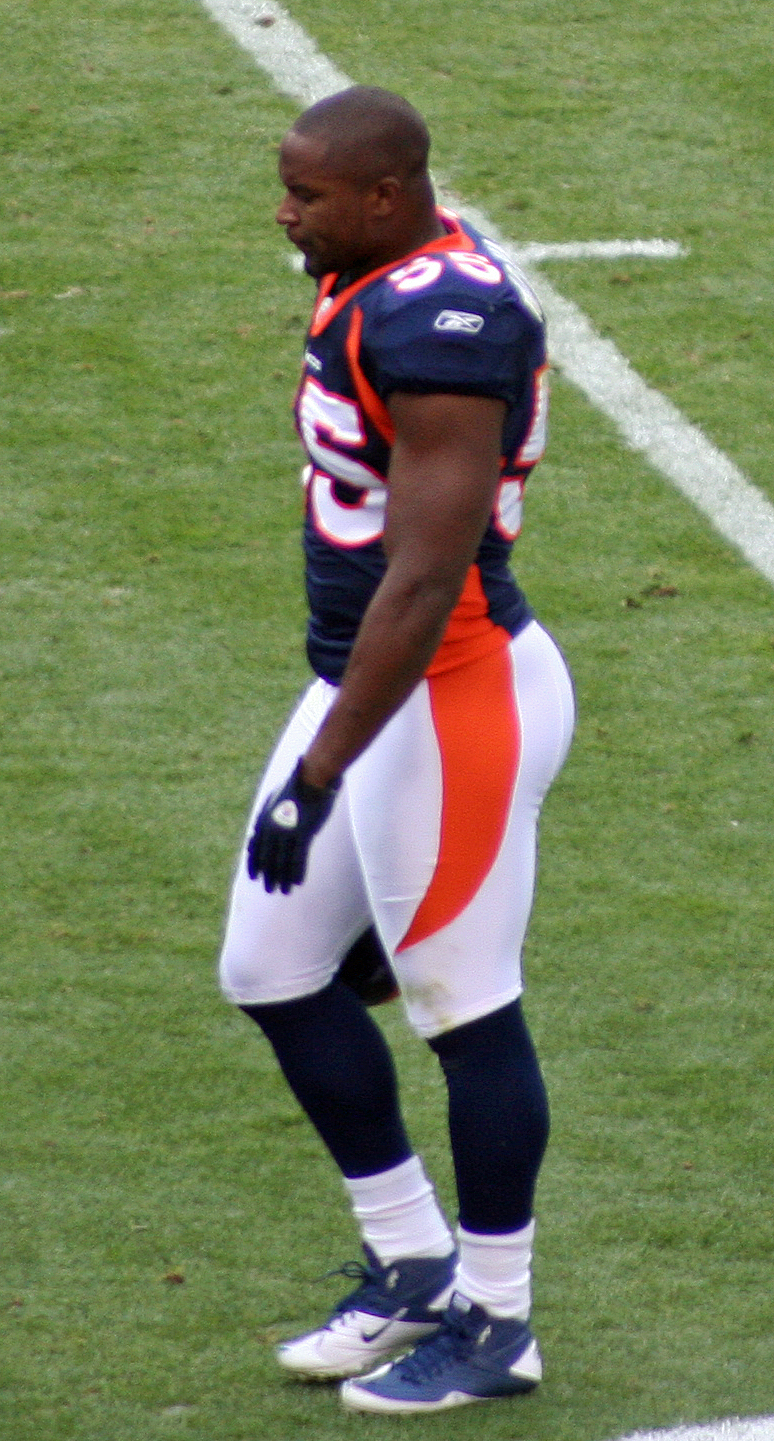
- Williams with the Denver Broncos in 2010

No. 52, 55, 58
- Position: Linebacker

Personal information
- Born: July 20, 1982 (age 44); Sacramento, California, U.S.
- Listed height: 6 ft 1 in (1.85 m)
- Listed weight: 242 lb (110 kg)

Career information
- High school: De La Salle (Concord, California)
- College: Miami (FL)
- NFL draft: 2004: 1st round, 17th overall pick

Career history
- Denver Broncos (2004–2012); Chicago Bears (2013–2014)

Awards and highlights
- PFWA All-Rookie Team (2004); BCS national champion (2001); Third-team All-American (2003); 2× First-team All-Big East (2002, 2003)

Career NFL statistics
- Total tackles: 899
- Sacks: 22.5
- Forced fumbles: 13
- Fumble recoveries: 7
- Interceptions: 2
- Stats at Pro Football Reference

Genos Derwin "D. J." Williams Jr. (born July 20, 1982) is an American former professional football player who was a linebacker for 11 seasons in the National Football League (NFL). He played college football at the University of Miami and was selected by the Denver Broncos in the first round of the 2004 NFL draft in the National Football League (NFL). He also played two seasons for the Chicago Bears.

== Early life ==
Williams, born and raised in Sacramento, California, lived with family in the Bay Area during high school. Williams did this in order to play high school football at Concord, California's De La Salle High School. He earned USA Today Defensive Player of the Year honors as a senior and was regarded as the top defensive player nationally. He compiled 130 tackles (87 solo) and rushed for 1,974 yards, six sacks, five forced fumbles, three fumbles recoveries. On offense, he broke the school record for touchdowns in a season with 42 (33 rushing, five receiving, three punt return and one kickoff return).

== College career ==
Williams started his collegiate career at the University of Miami at fullback due to a logjam at the linebacker position. Although he was used sparingly in his freshman year in 2000, he recorded 18 career rushes for 142 yards (7.9 avg.) with two touchdowns while catching 12 passes for 143 yards over his career.

Williams switched back to his favored linebacker position in 2001 and was quiet but productive member of the National Championship team. He compiled 51 tackles (25 solo), and one crucial forced fumble in the Rose Bowl against Nebraska.

In 2002, he was one of 11 semi-finalists for the Butkus Award along with teammate Jonathan Vilma, who was also a second-team All-BIG EAST selection. He registered 108 tackles (55 solos) to rank second on the team, notched four sacks, forced two fumbles, and broke up eight passes.

In his final year at Miami he blossomed into one of the best players in the country, finishing his senior year in 2003 as a semifinalist for the Butkus Award. He also a named third-team All-American by the Associated Press and a first-team All-Big East Conference choice. Williams finished second on the team with 82 tackles (44 solo) and tie for the team-lead with six sacks, forced a fumble and recovered another. His highlight of the season was a 61-yard run for a touchdown off a fake punt.

== Professional career ==
Pre-draft measurables
Height	Weight	Arm length	Hand span	40-yard dash	20-yard shuttle	Three-cone drill	Vertical jump	Broad jump
6 ft 0 3/4 in (1.85 m)	250 lb (113 kg)	31 1/8 in (0.79 m)	9 1/4 in (0.23 m)	4.53 s	4.05 s	7.00 s	38.0 in (0.97 m)	9 ft 9 in (2.97 m)
All values from NFL Combine/Pro Day

=== Denver Broncos ===
==== 2004 ====
Williams was selected by the Denver Broncos in the first round (17th overall) of the 2004 NFL draft. Williams emerged as one of the league's top linebackers. In his rookie year, he started 14 of 16 games and led the Broncos with 114 tackles (82 solo). He also recorded two sacks, one interception and one forced fumble. Although an early candidate for Defensive Rookie of the Year, the award went to then-New York Jets linebacker Jonathan Vilma.

==== 2005 ====
Williams was moved from his weak-side linebacker position to strong-side linebacker following the Broncos signing of Ian Gold. He finished with 55 tackles (39 solo) while adding three pass deflections and one forced fumble. Williams also contributed two tackles and a forced fumble on special teams. He pleaded guilty in September 2005 to driving drunk and was ordered to perform 24 hours of community service.

==== 2006 ====
In the 2006 season, he amassed 76 tackles (59 solo), a sack, one forced fumble, two pass deflections.

==== 2007 ====
Following the injury-related release of Al Wilson, Williams was moved to his third position, middle linebacker. He finished the 2007 season 2nd in the NFL with 141 tackles (106 solo) along with one sack and one interception.

==== 2009–2010 ====
2009 brought change to the Broncos defense when former Patriots offensive coordinator, Josh McDaniels was hired as head coach. McDaniels hired former 49ers head coach and defensive guru Mike Nolan as defensive coordinator. Nolan installed the 3–4 defense, in which he moved D. J. Williams to inside linebacker (ILB). Playing the "Jack" ILB position (same as Patrick Willis - 49ers), Williams finished the season with 122 tackles, 3.5 sacks and 3 forced fumbles.

On November 12, 2010, Williams was pulled over by a police officer for driving without headlights on. He was cited for DUI, a misdemeanor and driving without headlights. As this was his second DUI charge, Williams faced a mandatory 10-day jail sentence and a minimum of two years probation if he was convicted - he was ordered to appear in court on December 13.

As a result of the arrest, the Denver Broncos fined Williams and demoted him from defensive co-captain. It was also announced that he would not start the Week 10 match-up against AFC West rivals the Kansas City Chiefs.

By the end of the season, Williams finished with 119 tackles (94 solo), 5.5 sacks, 9 pass deflection and 1 forced fumble.

==== 2012 ====
In March 2012, Williams was suspended for six games after failing a mandatory league drug test. Wesley Woodyard replaced Williams at linebacker. Williams' suspension was extended by three games by the NFL.

Williams was released by the Broncos on March 11, 2013.

=== Chicago Bears ===
==== 2013 ====
On March 22, 2013, the Chicago Bears signed Williams to a one-year contract. In week six against the New York Giants, Williams ruptured his pectoral tendon. He was placed on injured reserve on October 18. Williams was a free agent after 2013, but re-signed with the Bears to a one-year deal on March 11, 2014.

=== NFL statistics ===
Years	Team	GP	COMB	SOLO	AST	SACK	FF	FR	FR YDS	INT	IR YDS	AVG IR	LNG IR	TD	PD
2004	DEN	16	114	81	33	2.0	1	0	0	1	10	10	10	0	7
2005	DEN	16	55	39	16	0.0	2	0	0	0	0	0	0	0	3
2006	DEN	16	76	59	17	1.0	1	0	0	0	0	0	0	0	2
2007	DEN	16	141	106	35	1.0	2	2	0	1	0	0	0	0	5
2008	DEN	11	93	68	25	2.5	0	1	0	0	0	0	0	0	2
2009	DEN	16	122	100	22	3.5	3	2	8	0	0	0	0	0	7
2010	DEN	16	119	94	25	5.5	1	1	0	0	0	0	0	0	9
2011	DEN	13	90	70	20	5.0	3	1	0	0	0	0	0	0	2
2012	DEN	7	14	10	4	0.0	0	0	0	0	0	0	0	0	1
2013	CHI	6	27	19	8	2.0	1	0	0	0	0	0	0	0	0
2014	CHI	12	46	30	16	0.0	0	0	0	0	0	0	0	0	0
Career		145	897	676	221	22.5	14	7	0	2	10	5	10	0	38
