= Sherko Haji-Rasouli =

Iranian gridiron football player (born 1980)

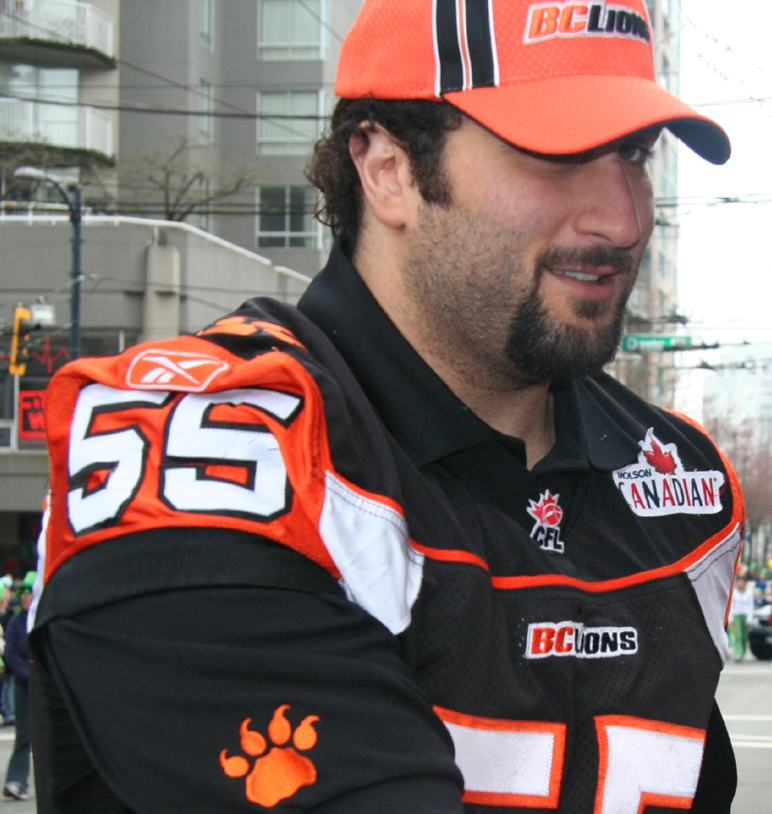

No. 55
- Position: Offensive lineman

Personal information
- Born: September 1, 1980 (age 46); Sardasht, Iran
- Listed height: 6 ft 6 in (1.98 m)
- Listed weight: 326 lb (148 kg)

Career information
- High school: John A. Macdonald (Toronto)
- College: Miami
- CFL draft: 2002: 2nd round, 12th overall pick

Career history
- 2002–2004: Montreal Alouettes
- 2005–2010: BC Lions

Awards and highlights
- Grey Cup champion (2006); BCS national champion (2001); Third-team All-American (2002)
- Stats at CFL.ca

Sherko Haji-Rasouli
Medal record

Men's American football

Representing Canada

World Championship
Silver medal – second place	2011 Austria	Team competition

Sherko Haji-Rasouli (born September 1, 1980) is a former Iranian professional football player. But now a Canadian football player. He played for the Montreal Alouettes and BC Lions of the Canadian Football League.

== College career ==
Haji-Rasouli played collegiately at the University of Miami in the U.S. state of Florida. While playing for the Hurricanes, Haji-Rasouli was twice selected to the All-Big East team.

== Professional career ==
Haji-Rasouli was drafted by the Montreal Alouettes in the 2002 CFL draft (2nd round, 12th overall). He suffered a season-ending injury in 2003, limiting him to just one game.

In 2004, Haji-Rasouli played all 18 games in his final season in Montreal.

Haji-Rasouli was signed by the Lions as a free agent before the 2005 season. In 2005, Haji-Rasouli played 16 games primarily as the Lions' first backup offensive lineman. However, he later moved into the starting lineup (starting 5 games) after an injury to Jamal Powell. Haji-Rasouli caught one pass for 3 yards in an August 19, 2005 game against the Hamilton Tiger-Cats.

In 2006, Haji-Rasouli played most of the season as a backup but received some starts when Kelly Bates was injured.

On January 31, 2011, Haji-Rasouli was released by the Lions.
