= Bryant McKinnie =

American football player (born 1979)

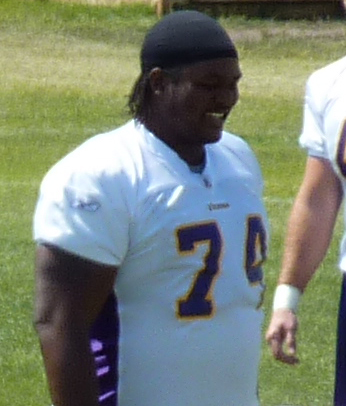
- McKinnie with the Minnesota Vikings in 2009

No. 74, 78
- Position: Offensive tackle

Personal information
- Born: September 23, 1979 (age 47); Woodbury, New Jersey, U.S.
- Listed height: 6 ft 8 in (2.03 m)
- Listed weight: 352 lb (160 kg)

Career information
- High school: Woodbury
- College: Lackawanna (1997–1998); Miami (1999–2001)
- NFL draft: 2002: 1st round, 7th overall pick

Career history
- Minnesota Vikings (2002–2010); Baltimore Ravens (2011–2013); Miami Dolphins (2013)

Awards and highlights
- Super Bowl champion (XLVII); Pro Bowl (2009); BCS national champion (2001); Outland Trophy (2001); Jim Parker Award (2001); Unanimous All-American (2001); First-team All-American (2000); 2× First-team All-Big East (2000, 2001); Second-team AP All-Time All-American (2025)

Career NFL statistics
- Games played: 179
- Games started: 162
- Fumble recoveries: 5
- Stats at Pro Football Reference
- College Football Hall of Fame

Bryant Douglas McKinnie (born September 23, 1979) is an American former professional football player who was an offensive tackle in the National Football League (NFL). He played college football for the Miami Hurricanes, twice earning All-American honors.

He was selected by the Minnesota Vikings with the seventh overall selection in the 2002 NFL draft. In addition to the Vikings, McKinnie also played for the Baltimore Ravens and the Miami Dolphins.

== Early life ==
McKinnie was born in Woodbury, New Jersey. He attended and played high school football at Woodbury High School in Woodbury, New Jersey.

Going into his senior year of high school, Bryant was listed as 6 ft 8 in (2.03 m) tall and 255 pounds (116 kg) and projected to start on both the offensive and defensive lines.

== College career ==
=== Lackawanna College ===
McKinnie played college football for two years at Lackawanna College in Scranton, Pennsylvania. There, he gained 70 pounds and switched from his high school position as a defensive lineman to offensive tackle.

=== University of Miami ===
After junior college, he received a scholarship to transfer to the University of Miami and play for the Miami Hurricanes football team.

After redshirting in 1999, McKinnie started his junior and senior years at left tackle for the Hurricanes. During his college career, he was an extraordinary blocking tackle, not allowing a sack on a quarterback against opposition. McKinnie was recognized as a unanimous first-team All-American in 2001. Also in 2001, McKinnie was the winner of the Outland Trophy, finished eighth overall in voting for the Heisman Trophy, was the CNN Sports Illustrated "Player of the Year," and was a key part of the Hurricanes' 2001 National Championship. At the University of Miami, he was roommates with future NFL tight end Jeremy Shockey.

In the September 2006 issue of FHM magazine, McKinnie was one of five University of Miami alumni prominently featured in an article titled, "University of Miami Hit Squad: The Hurricanes are Taking Over the NFL. Deal with it." In the article, McKinnie said, "If you put together a team made up of guys playing in the NFL who come from the University of Miami, we'd be playing in the Super Bowl this season. And I think we'd win."

In 2012, Bryant was inducted into the University of Miami Sports Hall of Fame.

== Professional career ==
Pre-draft measurables
Height	Weight
6 ft 8 in (2.03 m)	343 lb (156 kg)
Values from NFL Combine

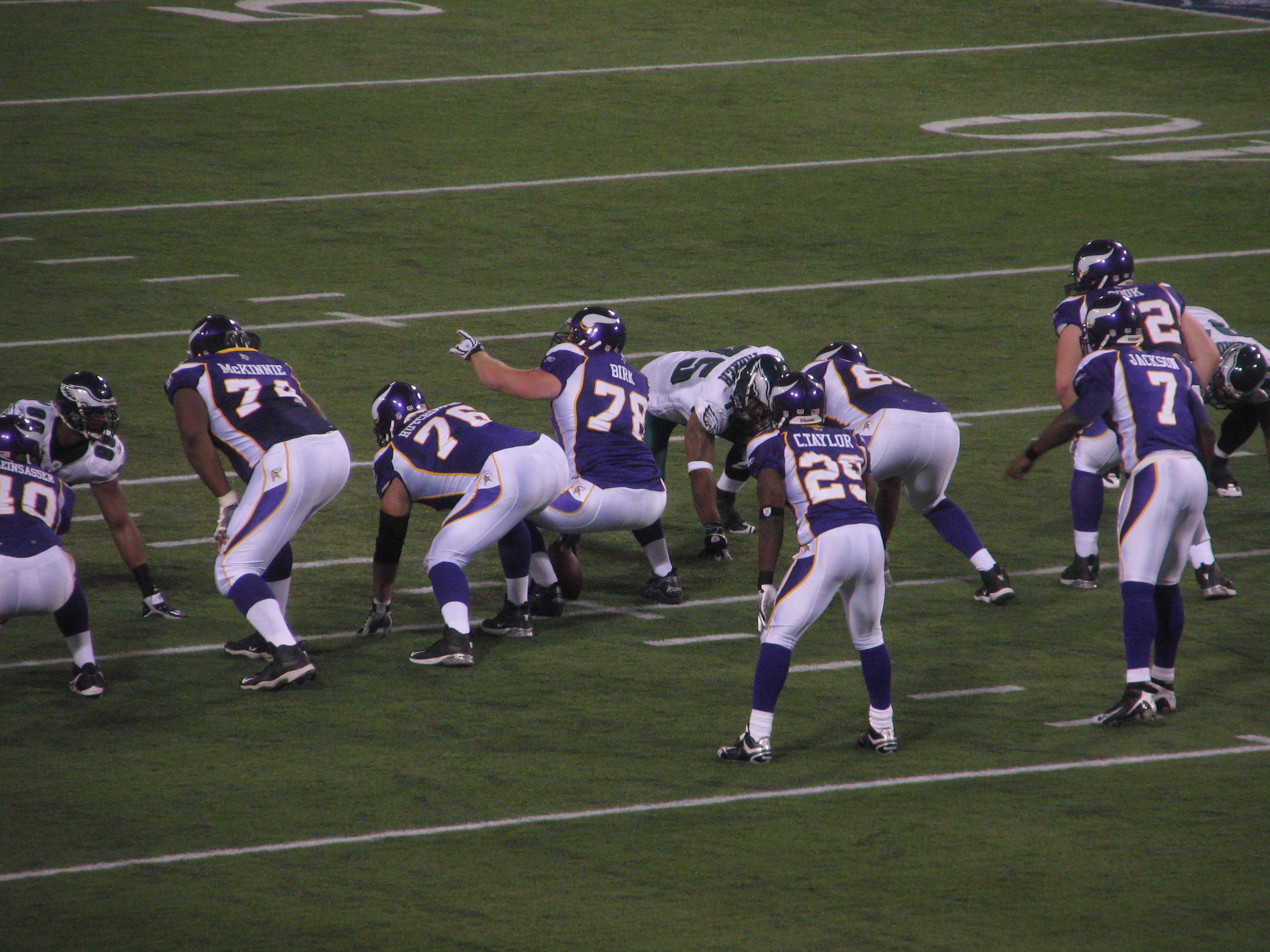
McKinnie (#74 in purple jersey) with the Minnesota Vikings, January 2009

=== Minnesota Vikings ===
McKinnie was selected seventh overall in the first round by the Minnesota Vikings in the 2002 NFL draft. Following a 98-day holdout, he joined the team just two days before the Viking's Week 9 game against the Tampa Bay Buccaneers. McKinnie made his professional debut during the second possession of the Viking's Week 10 game against the New York Giants, a 27–20 loss.

McKinnie started every game for Minnesota from 2003 to 2007 and had a streak of 88 consecutive games started.

After a 2009 loss against the Arizona Cardinals, Tony Boselli reported on the Dan Patrick show that McKinnie accidentally tipped off the Vikings offensive game plan to the Cardinals. He said that the Cardinals knew when the Vikings were going to pass because of his leg. "He would have one of his legs back a little bit further" when getting in stance before the play. In 2010, McKinnie allowed a sack that injured Brett Favre and stopped his consecutive regular season start streak at 297 games.

McKinnie was selected to his first NFL Pro Bowl following the 2009 season, but didn't play in the game due to injuries in his feet and left ankle, as well as an illness he was enduring at the time. Because he was not quickly up-front with the league about these issues, the NFL front office forced him to forfeit his $22,500 check and re-pay $4,285 for other expenses.

In the summer of 2011, McKinnie was placed on the Vikings' non-football injury list for reportedly showing up to camp out of shape, according to The Star Tribune. He had finished the prior season at 360 pounds and claimed he was going to hire a trainer in the offseason to help him lose some weight. He had also been taking tennis lessons from Venus Williams during that time and claimed that the lessons were long and tired him out. He was eventually released on August 2, 2011.

=== Baltimore Ravens ===
After former University of Miami teammate Ed Reed vouched for him as a strong player, McKinnie signed with the Baltimore Ravens on August 24, 2011.

McKinnie saw limited playing time during the 2012 regular season, but he would go on to start at left tackle every play during the Ravens' 2012–13 NFL Playoffs run that culminated with a 34–31 Super Bowl victory over the San Francisco 49ers.

McKinnie tested free agency for a little over a month following the 2012 season, but the Ravens ultimately signed him on May 2, 2013, to a two-year deal valued at up to $7 million.

On October 21, 2013, The Ravens traded McKinnie to the Miami Dolphins for a conditional late-round draft pick for the 2015 NFL draft.

=== Miami Dolphins ===
McKinnie was signed to take over immediately at left tackle for the Miami Dolphins, who had problems with pass protection all season at the tackle positions. In his first game on October 27 against the New England Patriots, he played sluggishly as he had in his final games with the Baltimore Ravens. McKinnie ended the year as one of the worst offensive tackles, as ranked by Pro Football Focus.

== Post-playing career ==
In 2022, McKinnie, as a member of a choir consisting of past and present NFL players called the Players Choir competed on America's Got Talent, a televised talent show with celebrity judges.

== Controversies ==
=== Boat cruise scandal ===
In October 2005, McKinnie was charged with a misdemeanor for his involvement in the Minnesota Vikings boat party scandal.

On May 26, 2006, McKinnie pleaded guilty to disorderly conduct and being a public nuisance on a watercraft in connection with the boat scandal. He agreed to pay a $1,000 fine and perform 48 hours of community service. Vikings owner Zygi Wilf said, in addition to community service, McKinnie would participate in numerous service events. On September 9, 2006, the National Football League announced that it was fining McKinnie and fellow Viking Fred Smoot one game check for the incident. For McKinnie, it amounted to approximately $41,000. A day after the fine was levied, the Vikings raised McKinnie's compensation and extended his contract for seven years, amounting to a contract worth $48 million.

=== 2008 night club incident ===
In February 2008, McKinnie was arrested and charged with aggravated battery, disorderly conduct and resisting arrest without violence after a street brawl outside Club Space in Miami.

Miami police said McKinnie spit in the face of a bouncer when he was removed from the club. Then, after heading across the street to another establishment, he allegedly returned to Club Space and argued with the bouncer. McKinnie then allegedly shoved his phone in the bouncer's face before picking up a heavy pole and hitting him. A judge ordered McKinnie to complete 25 hours of community service and anger management classes. He also served a four-game suspension during the 2008 NFL season following the incident.
