= William Joseph (American football) =

American football player (born 1979)

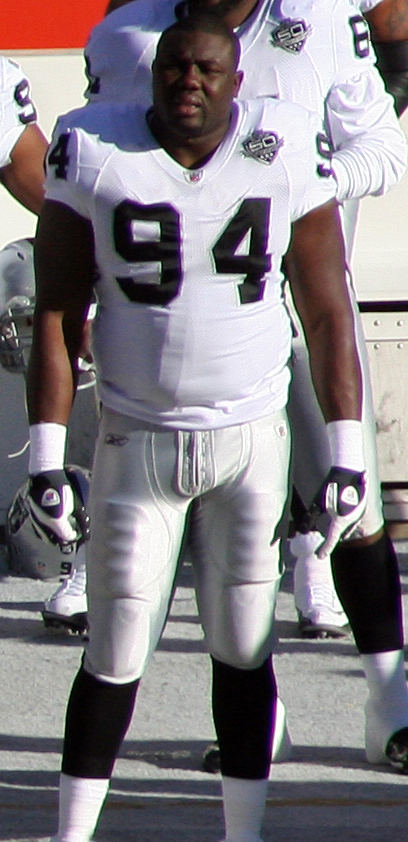
- Joseph with the Oakland Raiders in 2009

No. 94, 96
- Position: Defensive tackle

Personal information
- Born: September 3, 1979 (age 47); Miami, Florida, U.S.
- Listed height: 6 ft 5 in (1.96 m)
- Listed weight: 310 lb (141 kg)

Career information
- High school: Edison (Miami)
- College: Miami (FL)
- NFL draft: 2003: 1st round, 25th overall pick

Career history
- New York Giants (2003–2007); Oakland Raiders (2008–2009)

Awards and highlights
- Super Bowl champion (XLII); BCS national champion (2001); Second-team All-American (2002); Third-team All-American (2001); Second-team Freshman All-American (1999); First-team All-Big East (2002); Second-team All-Big East (2001)

Career NFL statistics
- Total tackles: 103
- Sacks: 7
- Forced fumbles: 2
- Fumble recoveries: 1
- Pass deflections: 7
- Stats at Pro Football Reference

William Joseph (born September 3, 1979) is an American former professional football player who was a defensive tackle in the National Football League (NFL). He played college football for the Miami Hurricanes before being selected by the New York Giants in the first round of the 2003 NFL draft. He finished his NFL career with the Oakland Raiders.

== Early life ==
A Haitian American, Joseph attended Edison High School and was Florida Class 6A Second-team All-State and First-team All-Dade County as a defensive end, recorded 109 tackles, 17 sacks, 12 tackles for loss, six fumbles caused and four fumbles recovered as a senior. As a junior, he totaled 90 tackles and 11 sacks.

== College career ==
Joseph started every game (51 including bowl games) of his Miami career. In 2002 as a senior he was a first-team All-Big East selection, making 51 total tackles (19 solo tackles), 16 tackles for losses, and five quarterback sacks. He also broke up five passes and had a team-high 29 quarterback hurries. In 2001 as a junior, he was third-team All-American recognition by the Associated Press and second-team All-Big East as he led the team in quarterback sacks (10) and tackles for loss (19). He also had 61 tackles. In 2002, he had total tackles with 40 (15 solos) with three quarterback sacks and 12 quarterback hurries. Joseph was a 1999 The Sporting News second-team freshman All-American. He began season at defensive end before moving to tackle and totaled 49 tackles with six tackles for loss, 1.5 sacks, 17 quarterback hurries, two pass break ups, one forced fumble, and one fumble recovered.

== Professional career ==
=== New York Giants ===
Joseph was selected by the New York Giants in the first round with the 25th overall pick in the 2003 NFL draft. After a holdout he signed a five-year $6.95 million contract August 5, 2003. He played in 14 games as a rookie, primarily as a reserve defensive tackle and finished the season with 6 tackles (3 solo), 1 sack and 1 forced fumble. In 2004, he played in 15 games with 4 starts and made 25 tackles (20 solo), 2 sacks and 2 passes defensed. In 2005 started all 10 regular season games in which he played and the NFC Wild Card Game at right defensive tackle. He finished the season with 19 tackles (14 solo), 2 sacks, 3 passes defensed and 1 fumble recover. He missed 6 of the last 7 regular season games due to injuries. The next season, 2006, he played in all 16 league games with three starts and recorded 21 tackles and two quarterback sacks. In 2007 Joseph played in the pre-season games and the regular season before sustaining a season-ending injury after which he was placed on injured reserve. Joseph earned a Super Bowl ring with the Giants in Super Bowl XLII.

=== Oakland Raiders ===
The Oakland Raiders signed Joseph on March 14, 2008, released him on September 2 and re-signed him on November 5, 2008. He finished the 2008 season with eight tackles.

Joseph was released on September 6, 2009, after the team acquired Richard Seymour from the New England Patriots only to be re-signed on September 11 after Seymour failed to show up. However, after Seymour showed up at the Raiders facility, Joseph was released again on September 14. He was re-signed on November 9.

Joseph was re-signed on March 23, 2010, but was later released prior to the start of the 2010 season.

== After football ==
On April 30, 2012, Joseph along with two other former NFL players were arrested on federal charges in connection with an alleged scheme to steal people's identities and file false tax returns.

Joseph was sentenced on November 30, 2012, to two years in prison, to be followed by three years of supervised release, for his participation in an identity theft tax refund fraud scheme. Joseph pleaded guilty on August 31, 2012, to one count of theft of government money and one count of aggravated identity theft.
