= 2002 Rose Bowl =

American college football bowl game

2002 Rose Bowl presented by AT&T
- BCS National Championship Game; 88th Rose Bowl Game
Nebraska Cornhuskers	Miami Hurricanes
(11–1)	(11–0)
Big 12	Big East
14	37
Head coach: Frank Solich	Head coach: Larry Coker
AP / Coaches / BCS; 4 / 4 / 2	AP / Coaches / BCS; 1 / 1 / 1
	1	2	3	4	Total
Nebraska	0	0	7	7	14
Miami	7	27	0	3	37
- Date: January 3, 2002
- Season: 2001
- Stadium: Rose Bowl
- Location: Pasadena, California
- MVP: Ken Dorsey (Miami QB) and Andre Johnson (Miami WR)
- Favorite: Miami by 8.5
- National anthem: Yolanda Adams
- Referee: Courtney Mauzy (ACC)
- Halftime show: Band of the Hour, University of Nebraska Cornhusker Marching Band
- Attendance: 93,781

United States TV coverage
- Network: ABC
- Announcers: Keith Jackson (play-by-play); Tim Brant (analyst); Todd Harris and Lynn Swann (sideline)
- Nielsen ratings: 13.8

The 2002 Rose Bowl, played on January 3, 2002, was a college football bowl game. It was the 88th Rose Bowl game and was the BCS National Championship Game of the 2001 college football season. The game featured the Miami Hurricanes and the Nebraska Cornhuskers, marking the first time since the 1919 Rose Bowl, and only the third time in the game's history, that neither the Big Ten nor the Pac-10 Conferences had a representative in this game. The Hurricanes won the game, 37–14, for their fifth national title. Miami quarterback Ken Dorsey and wide receiver Andre Johnson were named the Rose Bowl Players of the Game.

== Teams ==
Because the Rose Bowl was hosting the BCS Championship game, as part of the agreement begun in the 1998 season, the Tournament of Roses committee would get the number one and number two ranked teams in the Bowl Championship Series system. However, this was actually the third Rose Bowl number one versus two pairing, with the first two in the 1963 and 1969 games.

=== Nebraska Cornhuskers and Miami Hurricanes ===
In yet another controversial season for the BCS, Nebraska was chosen as a national title contender despite not having played in the Big 12 championship game. The Huskers went into their last regularly scheduled game at Colorado undefeated, but were beaten by Colorado 62–36. The Huskers dropped to the 6th in the wire service polls but only 4th in the BCS. In the ensuing two weeks, #2 Florida lost to Tennessee, the Colorado Buffaloes (ranked 7th in the BCS) went on to win the Big 12 Championship Game over Texas (ranked 3rd), and in the SEC Championship Game, Tennessee (now at #2) was stunned by LSU. This left Miami as the undefeated and undisputed No. 1 team in the country but a host of other teams vying for #2. The BCS computers did not take into account at which point a team's loss came during the season. There were also components for strength of schedule, quality win, and margin of victory. With this calculation, one-loss Nebraska came out ahead of two-loss Colorado and one-loss, second-ranked Oregon.

Previously, Nebraska had appeared in the 1941 Rose Bowl in a 21–13 loss to Stanford. This was the first appearance for the Miami Hurricanes in the Rose Bowl.

=== Pac-10 and Big Ten ===
Oregon was the champion of the Pacific-10 Conference and was ranked No. 2 in the AP Poll. They were selected for the 2002 Fiesta Bowl, where they faced No. 3 ranked Colorado, who was No. 4 in the BCS poll. The Illinois Fighting Illini, ranked No. 8 in the BCS, won the Big Ten Conference championship and were picked for the 2002 Sugar Bowl.

== Scoring summary ==
Scoring Play	Score
1st quarter
UM – Andre Johnson 50-yard pass from Ken Dorsey (Todd Sievers kick). 6:51	UM 7–0
2nd quarter
UM – Clinton Portis 39-yard run (Sievers kick). 14:33	UM 14–0
UM – James Lewis 47-yard interception return (Sievers kick). 12:52	UM 21–0
UM – Jeremy Shockey 21-yard pass from Dorsey (Kick failed). 10:40	UM 27–0
UM – Johnson 8-yard pass from Dorsey (Sievers kick). 3:35	UM 34–0
3rd quarter
NU – Judd Davies 16-yard run. (Josh Brown kick). 2:39	UM 34–7
4th quarter
NU – DeJuan Groce 71-yard punt return (Brown kick). 14:28	UM 34–14
UM – Sievers 37-yard field goal. 10:04	UM 37–14

== Aftermath ==
Upon the conclusion of the championship game, many considered the 2001 Miami Hurricanes as one of the greatest college football teams ever.

Oregon defeated Colorado in the 2002 Fiesta Bowl. In the final AP poll, Miami was the unanimous No. 1 team, Oregon was #2. The next time that the Rose Bowl hosted the BCS championship, the 2006 Rose Bowl, the USC Trojans would be a participant. The 2002 contest was the last one not to feature a team from either the Big Ten or Pacific-10 until the 2018 Rose Bowl, which was a component of the College Football Playoff and pitted Georgia against Oklahoma.

The game, which was played on a Thursday night, two days after the parade, has been remembered as a low point for the Rose Bowl. University of Michigan coach Bo Schembechler remarked, "Didn't watch it," when asked what he thought of the 2002 Rose Bowl.

The 2002 Rose Bowl was the first broadcast not set at the traditional 2:00pm West Coast time. The visual of the afternoon sun setting on the San Gabriel Mountains on New Year's Day is recognized as an important part of the tradition of the game.
