= List of Miami Hurricanes in the NFL draft =

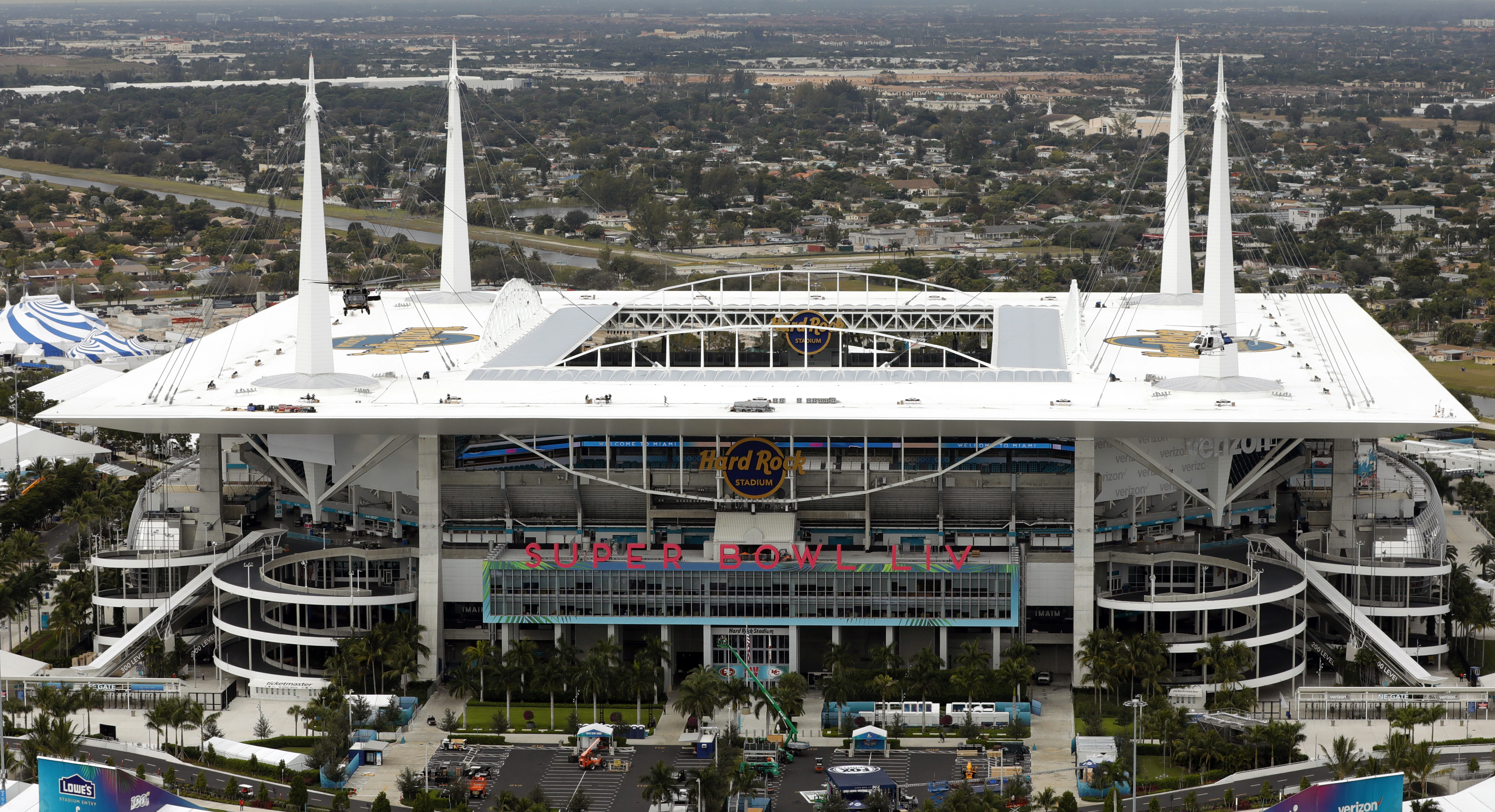
Hard Rock Stadium in Miami Gardens, the home field for the Miami Hurricanes football team

The University of Miami holds a number of NFL draft records, including most first-round selections in a single draft and most consecutive drafts with at least one first-round selection. As of 2026, at least one University of Miami player has been selected in 51 consecutive NFL drafts, dating back to 1975. Among all colleges and universities, as of 2022, the University of Miami holds the all-time record for the most defensive linemen (49) and is tied with USC for the most wide receivers (40) to go on to play in the NFL.

The following is a list of University of Miami Hurricanes football players selected in the NFL draft:

== Key ==
B	Back	K	Kicker	NT	Nose tackle
C	Center	LB	Linebacker	FB	Fullback
DB	Defensive back	P	Punter	HB	Halfback
DE	Defensive end	QB	Quarterback	WR	Wide receiver
DT	Defensive tackle	RB	Running back	G	Guard
E	End	T	Offensive tackle	TE	Tight end

= Pro Bowler
= Hall of Famer

== Players ==
=== American Football League ===
Year	Round	Pick	Overall	Team	Name	Position
1960	1	–	–	Denver Broncos	Robert Rosbaugh	HB
1960	1	–	–	Oakland Raiders	Fran Curci	QB
1960	1	–	–	Oakland Raiders	Jim Otto	C
1961	8	3	59	Buffalo Bills	Charles Linning	T
1961	8	6	62	Dallas Texans	John O'Day	C
1961	24	4	188	Oakland Raiders	Jack Novak	G
1962	2	3	11	Dallas Texans	Bill Miller	E
1962	18	1	145	Oakland Raiders	Jim Vollenweider	FB
1962	34	6	270	New England Patriots	Ray Lardani	G
1963	9	7	71	New England Patriots	Jim Simon	G
1963	15	8	119	New England Patriots	Bob Dentel	C
1963	16	3	123	New York Jets	Nick Ryder	FB
1963	16	7	127	Houston Oilers	Rex Benson	T
1963	29	8	232	Kansas City Chiefs	John Sisk Jr.	DB
1964	2	8	15	Oakland Raiders	Dan Conners	LB
1964	8	1	137	Denver Broncos	George Mira	QB
1965	8	7	64	New England Patriots	Fred Brown	DT
1965	RS4	4	28	New York Jets	Bob Werl	DE
1966	5	7	40	San Diego Chargers	Russ Smith	RB
1966	6	1	42	Miami Dolphins	Ed Weisacosky	LB
1966	7	9	59	Oakland Raiders	Pete Banaszak	RB
1966	19	3	166	Denver Broncos	Tom Coughlin	DE

=== National Football League ===
Year	Round	Pick	Overall	Team	Name	Position
1937	6	10	50	Chicago Bears	Bob Masterson	E
1940	13	3	113	Pittsburgh Steelers	John Noppenberg	B
1940	22	2	197	Chicago Bears	Walt Kichefski	E
1941	17	3	153	Pittsburgh Steelers	Terry Fox	B
1942	8	8	68	New York Giants	Tom Kearns	T
1942	15	10	140	Chicago Bears	Joe Krutulis	E
1944	18	8	183	Chicago Bears	Howdy Plasman	B
1944	28	4	289	Pittsburgh Steelers	Pat Petroski	G
1945	3	2	18	Chicago Cardinals	Walter Watt	B
1946	23	2	212	Boston Yanks	Bill Levitt	C
1946	23	7	217	Philadelphia Eagles	Ed Cameron	G
1947	7	6	51	Philadelphia Eagles	Tony Yovicsin	E
1947	8	1	56	Detroit Lions	Harvey James	C
1947	9	7	72	Green Bay Packers	Bob McDougal	B
1949	11	1	102	Detroit Lions	Ernie Settembre	T
1951	4	10	49	Chicago Bears	Tom Jelley	E
1951	5	4	54	San Francisco 49ers	Al Carapella	T
1951	13	5	152	Philadelphia Eagles	Pete Mastellone	C
1951	18	11	218	New York Giants	Frank Smith	B
1951	29	2	314	Green Bay Packers	Ralph Fieler	E
1952	1	8	8	Chicago Bears	Jim Dooley	B
1952	30	3	352	Chicago Cardinals	Will Stolk	B
1953	15	3	172	Chicago Cardinals	Nick Chickillo	G
1953	24	5	282	Pittsburgh Steelers	Bob Schneidenbach	B
1954	21	6	247	Pittsburgh Steelers	Dan Tassotti	T
1955	4	2	39	Detroit Lions	Gordon Malloy	B
1955	7	2	75	Baltimore Colts	Frank McDonald	E
1955	11	1	122	Chicago Cardinals	Tom Pepsin	E
1956	1	8	8	Green Bay Packers	Jack Losch	HB
1956	9	10	107	Washington Redskins	Francis "Whitey" Rouviere	B
1956	10	9	118	Pittsburgh Steelers	Bob Dolan	E
1956	11	7	128	Green Bay Packers	Mike Hudock	C
1957	1	9	9	Washington Redskins	Don Bosseler	FB
1957	4	11	49	Chicago Bears	Jack Johnson	B
1957	9	5	102	Pittsburgh Steelers	Charley Hutchings	T
1957	19	4	221	Pittsburgh Steelers	Phil Bennett	E
1958	4	9	46	San Francisco 49ers	John Varone	B
1961	5	12	68	Green Bay Packers	Jack Novak	G
1961	6	3	73	Washington Redskins	John O'Day	T
1961	15	5	201	Chicago Bears	Chuck Linning	T
1961	15	12	208	Green Bay Packers	Ray Lardani	T
1962	3	2	30	Minnesota Vikings	Bill Miller	E
1962	8	2	106	San Francisco 49ers	Jim Vollenweider	B
1962	12	7	161	Chicago Bears	Bill Watts	T
1962	13	6	174	St. Louis Cardinals	Bill Diamond	G
1963	5	4	60	Los Angeles Rams	Roland Benson	T
1963	8	2	100	Minnesota Vikings	Jim O'Mahoney	LB
1963	10	13	139	Detroit Lions	Nick Ryder	B
1963	15	10	206	Chicago Bears	Bob Dentel	C
1963	15	12	209	Detroit Lions	Jim Simon	E
1963	17	10	234	Chicago Bears	John Sisk	B
1963	20	4	270	Philadelphia Eagles	Ben Rizzo	B
1964	2	1	15	San Francisco 49ers	George Mira	QB
1964	5	14	70	Chicago Bears	Dan Conners	T
1965	3	9	37	Chicago Bears	Fred Brown	E
1965	12	8	162	Los Angeles Rams	Bob Werl	E
1967	1	24	24	Kansas City Chiefs	Gene Trosch	DT
1967	6	7	140	Pittsburgh Steelers	Mike Haggerty	T
1967	10	4	241	Miami Dolphins	Tom Beier	DB
1967	16	25	241	Green Bay Packers	Fred Cassidy	RB
1968	2	7	34	Buffalo Bills	Bob Tadarek	DT
1968	2	27	54	Miami Dolphins	Jim Cox	WR
1968	7	1	166	Cincinnati Bengals	Steve Smith	TE
1968	8	6	198	Minnesota Vikings	Hank Urbanowicz	TE
1968	8	13	205	St. Louis Cardinals	Jerry Daanen	WR
1968	10	7	253	Miami Dolphins	Joe Mirto	T
1968	15	7	388	Miami Dolphins	Ken Corbin	LB
1968	15	20	401	Kansas City Chiefs	Bill Chambless	G
1968	15	27	408	Cincinnati Bengals	Joe Mira	WR
1969	2	7	33	Baltimore Colts	Ted Hendricks	LB
1970	4	24	102	Oakland Raiders	Tony Cline	LB
1970	8	6	188	Cincinnati Bengals	Bill Trout	DT
1970	10	22	256	Los Angeles Rams	Vince Opalsky	RB
1971	9	19	228	Los Angeles Rams	Joe Schmidt	WR
1971	16	22	412	Oakland Raiders	Tony Stawarz	DB
1972	15	14	378	Philadelphia Eagles	Tom Sullivan	DB
1972	17	5	421	Houston Oilers	Kelly Cochrane	QB
1973	1	12	12	Minnesota Vikings	Chuck Foreman	RB
1973	1	13	13	New York Jets	Burgess Owens	S
1973	2	9	35	Baltimore Colts	Mike Barnes	DE
1973	7	26	182	Miami Dolphins	Tom Smith	RB
1973	8	15	197	Kansas City Chiefs	Al Palewicz	LB
1975	1	11	11	Los Angeles Rams	Dennis Harrah	OT
1975	3	12	65	Atlanta Falcons	Woody Thompson	RB
1975	5	14	118	New York Jets	Joe Wysock	G
1975	5	17	121	Denver Broncos	Rubin Carter	DT
1975	7	11	167	Philadelphia Eagles	Bill Capraun	T
1975	15	4	368	Chicago Bears	Steve Marcantonio	WR
1975	16	5	395	Chicago Bears	Witt Beckman	WR
1976	5	21	145	Detroit Lions	Steadman Scavella	LB
1976	5	29	153	Seattle Seahawks	Ernie Jones	DB
1976	5	32	156	Seattle Seahawks	Larry Bates	RB
1976	6	3	159	Pittsburgh Steelers	Gary Dunn	DT
1976	16	20	451	Baltimore Colts	Steve Ludwig	C
1976	16	24	455	Cincinnati Bengals	George Demopoulis	T
1977	1	3	3	Cincinnati Bengals	Eddie Edwards	DE
1977	8	22	217	Pittsburgh Steelers	Phil August	WR
1977	10	14	266	Chicago Bears	Dennis Breckner	DE
1978	2	20	48	Minnesota Vikings	John Turner	DB
1978	8	2	196	Tampa Bay Buccaneers	John McGriff	LB
1978	9	2	224	Kansas City Chiefs	Larry Brown	T
1978	10	19	269	New England Patriots	Bryan Ferguson	DB
1978	11	22	301	Seattle Seahawks	George Halas	LB
1979	7	7	172	New York Giants	Steve Alvers	TE
1979	11	9	284	New York Giants	Ken Johnson	RB
1980	12	21	326	Tampa Bay Buccaneers	Gene Coleman	DB
1981	10	15	263	St. Louis Cardinals	Jim Joiner	WR
1981	11	14	290	Denver Broncos	Pat Walker	DB
1982	5	1	112	New England Patriots	Fred Marion	S
1982	5	9	120	Miami Dolphins	Bob Nelson	DT
1982	9	5	228	Seattle Seahawks	David Jefferson	LB
1982	10	17	268	Kansas City Chiefs	Larry Brodsky	WR
1982	11	2	281	Washington Redskins	Dan Miller	K
1982	12	4	310	Cleveland Browns	Scott Nicolas	LB
1982	12	25	331	Miami Dolphins	Mike Rodrigue	WR
1983	1	14	14	Buffalo Bills	Jim Kelly	QB
1983	2	3	31	Denver Broncos	Mark Cooper	T
1983	4	16	100	Minnesota Vikings	Mark Rush	RB
1983	5	19	131	Tampa Bay Buccaneers	Tony Chickillo	DT
1983	7	8	176	Cleveland Browns	Rocky Belk	WR
1983	8	18	214	New England Patriots	Ronnie Lippett	DB
1983	11	4	283	Denver Broncos	Don Bailey	C
1984	2	11	39	New York Jets	Glenn Dennison	TE
1984	2	25	53	Miami Dolphins	Jay Brophy	LB
1984	3	21	77	Buffalo Bills	Rodney Bellinger	DB
1984	3	26	82	Buffalo Bills	Speedy Neal	RB
1984	8	2	198	Tampa Bay Buccaneers	Fred Robinson	DE
1984	10	27	198	Washington Redskins	Keith Griffin	RB
1984	11	28	308	Minnesota Vikings	Lawrence Thompson	WR
1985	1	1	13	Cincinnati Bengals	Eddie Brown	WR
1985	4	4	88	Indianapolis Colts	Willie Broughton	DE
1985	7	15	183	Kansas City Chiefs	Dave Heffernan	G
1985	7	26	194	Denver Broncos	Dallas Cameron	DT
1985	8	10	206	New Orleans Saints	Joe Kohlbrand	LB
1986	4	18	102	San Francisco 49ers	Kevin Fagan	DT
1986	5	5	115	New Orleans Saints	Reggie Sutton	DB
1986	10	16	265	Cleveland Browns	Willie Smith	TE
1986	12	16	321	Seattle Seahawks	John McVeigh	LB
1987	1	1	1	Tampa Bay Buccaneers	Vinny Testaverde	QB
1987	1	3	3	Houston Oilers	Alonzo Highsmith	RB
1987	1	9	9	Philadelphia Eagles	Jerome Brown	DT
1987	2	4	32	Cleveland Browns	Gregg Rakoczy	C
1987	2	22	50	Tampa Bay Buccaneers	Winston Moss	LB
1987	5	28	140	New York Giants	Paul O'Connor	G
1987	11	18	297	Seattle Seahawks	Darryl Oliver	RB
1988	1	3	3	Detroit Lions	Bennie Blades	S
1988	1	11	11	Dallas Cowboys	Michael Irvin	WR
1988	2	6	33	San Francisco 49ers	Danny Stubbs	OLB
1988	2	22	49	Seattle Seahawks	Brian Blades	WR
1988	2	25	52	New Orleans Saints	Brett Perriman	WR
1988	3	3	64	Philadelphia Eagles	Matt Patchan	T
1988	5	15	124	Minnesota Vikings	Darrell Fullington	S
1988	6	18	155	Pittsburgh Steelers	Warren Williams	RB
1988	8	4	197	Kansas City Chiefs	Alfredo Roberts	TE
1988	10	20	269	Seattle Seahawks	Derwin Jones	DE
1988	12	26	331	San Francisco 49ers	George Mira Jr.	LB
1989	1	21	21	Los Angeles Rams	Bill Hawkins	DE
1989	1	26	26	Los Angeles Rams	Cleveland Gary	RB
1989	3	19	77	Houston Oilers	Bubba McDowell	S
1989	7	13	180	Denver Broncos	Melvin Bratton	RB
1989	10	1	252	Dallas Cowboys	Rod Carter	LB
1989	11	1	280	Dallas Cowboys	Randy Shannon	LB
1989	12	19	326	New York Giants	Eric Smith	DE
1990	1	3	3	Seattle Seahawks	Cortez Kennedy	DT
1990	3	11	64	Dallas Cowboys	Jimmie Jones	DT
1990	3	12	65	Cincinnati Bengals	Bernard Clark	ILB
1990	3	19	72	Houston Oilers	Willis Peguese	DE
1990	3	26	79	New York Giants	Greg Mark	ILB
1990	5	17	126	Houston Oilers	Richard Newbill	LB
1990	9	2	223	New York Jets	Dale Dawkins	WR
1990	10	8	256	San Diego Chargers	Kenny Berry	DB
1990	12	11	315	Miami Dolphins	Bobby Harden	S
1991	1	1	1	Dallas Cowboys	Russell Maryland	DT
1991	1	23	23	Miami Dolphins	Randal Hill	WR
1991	2	13	40	Indianapolis Colts	Shane Curry	DE
1991	2	15	42	New Orleans Saints	Wesley Carroll	WR
1991	4	24	107	Los Angeles Rams	Robert Bailey	CB
1991	5	24	131	Philadelphia Eagles	Craig Erickson	QB
1991	6	14	153	Dallas Cowboys	Mike Sullivan	G
1991	8	25	220	Miami Dolphins	Roland Smith	DB
1991	10	1	251	New England Patriots	Randy Bethel	TE
1991	10	28	278	New York Giants	Luis Cristobal	G
1991	12	19	325	Houston Oilers	Alex Johnson	WR
1992	1	11	11	Pittsburgh Steelers	Leon Searcy	OT
1992	4	2	86	Tampa Bay Buccaneers	Craig Erickson	QB
1992	10	11	263	Seattle Seahawks	Anthony Hamlet	DE
1992	12	4	312	Los Angeles Rams	Kelvin Harris	C
1992	12	7	315	San Diego Chargers	Carlos Huerta	K
1993	2	4	33	Detroit Lions	Ryan McNeil	CB
1993	2	17	46	Dallas Cowboys	Kevin Williams	WR
1993	2	18	47	Houston Oilers	Micheal Barrow	LB
1993	2	25	54	Dallas Cowboys	Darrin Smith	LB
1993	3	4	60	Tampa Bay Buccaneers	Lamar Thomas	WR
1993	4	20	104	Tampa Bay Buccaneers	Horace Copeland	WR
1993	5	17	157	Indianapolis Colts	Carlos Etheredge	TE
1993	7	24	192	Minnesota Vikings	Gino Torretta	QB
1993	8	11	207	New York Giants	Jessie Armstead	LB
1994	2	29	58	Kansas City Chiefs	Donnell Bennett	FB
1994	5	18	150	San Diego Chargers	Darren Krein	DE
1995	1	12	12	Tampa Bay Buccaneers	Warren Sapp	DT
1995	2	20	52	Chicago Bears	Pat Riley	DT
1995	3	14	78	Philadelphia Eagles	Chris T. Jones	WR
1995	4	5	103	Washington Redskins	Larry Jones	RB
1995	5	23	157	Minnesota Vikings	James Stewart	RB
1995	7	3	211	Houston Oilers	C. J. Richardson	S
1995	7	23	231	Cleveland Browns	A. C. Tellison	WR
1996	1	26	26	Baltimore Ravens	Ray Lewis	LB
1996	6	8	175	St. Louis Rams	Derrick Harris	RB
1997	1	15	15	Miami Dolphins	Yatil Green	WR
1997	1	17	17	Washington Redskins	Kenard Lang	DE
1997	1	18	18	Tennessee Oilers	Kenny Holmes	DE
1997	4	15	111	Cincinnati Bengals	Tremain Mack	S
1997	5	3	133	Atlanta Falcons	Marcus Wimberly	S
1997	5	18	148	Washington Redskins	Twan Russell	LB
1997	6	29	192	New England Patriots	Tony Gaiter	WR
1997	7	10	211	Seattle Seahawks	Carlos Jones	CB
1998	1	10	10	Baltimore Ravens	Duane Starks	CB
1998	3	13	74	Atlanta Falcons	Jammi German	WR
1999	1	4	4	Indianapolis Colts	Edgerrin James	RB
1999	5	2	135	Cincinnati Bengals	Nick Luchey	FB
1999	7	39	245	Cincinnati Bengals	Scott Covington	QB
2000	1	14	14	Green Bay Packers	Bubba Franks	TE
2000	2	25	56	Minnesota Vikings	Michael Boireau	DE
2000	3	28	90	Tampa Bay Buccaneers	Nate Webster	LB
2000	5	19	148	Baltimore Ravens	Richard Mercier	TE
2000	7	21	227	Oakland Raiders	Mondriel Fulcher	TE
2001	1	11	11	Carolina Panthers	Dan Morgan	LB
2001	1	12	12	St. Louis Rams	Damione Lewis	DT
2001	1	16	16	New York Jets	Santana Moss	WR
2001	1	30	30	Indianapolis Colts	Reggie Wayne	WR
2001	3	3	65	Cleveland Browns	James Jackson	RB
2001	6	37	200	New England Patriots	Leonard Myers	CB
2001	7	45	245	Cleveland Browns	Andre King	WR
2002	1	7	7	Minnesota Vikings	Bryant McKinnie	OT
2002	1	14	14	New York Giants	Jeremy Shockey	TE
2002	1	17	17	Oakland Raiders	Phillip Buchanon	CB
2002	1	24	24	Baltimore Ravens	Ed Reed	S
2002	1	27	27	San Francisco 49ers	Mike Rumph	CB
2002	2	19	51	Denver Broncos	Clinton Portis	RB
2002	4	18	116	Atlanta Falcons	Martin Bibla	G
2002	4	37	135	Green Bay Packers	Najeh Davenport	RB
2002	6	11	183	Indianapolis Colts	James Lewis	S
2002	7	15	226	New York Giants	Daryl Jones	WR
2002	7	16	227	Cleveland Browns	Joaquin Gonzalez	T
2003	1	3	3	Houston Texans	Andre Johnson	WR
2003	1	15	15	Philadelphia Eagles	Jerome McDougle	DE
2003	1	23	23	Buffalo Bills	Willis McGahee	RB
2003	1	25	25	New York Giants	William Joseph	DT
2003	3	25	89	San Francisco 49ers	Andrew Williams	DE
2003	4	34	131	Philadelphia Eagles	Jamaal Green	DE
2003	5	15	150	New York Jets	Matt Walters	DE
2003	7	27	241	San Francisco 49ers	Ken Dorsey	QB
2004	1	5	5	Washington Redskins	Sean Taylor	S
2004	1	6	6	Cleveland Browns	Kellen Winslow II	TE
2004	1	12	12	New York Jets	Jonathan Vilma	LB
2004	1	17	17	Denver Broncos	D. J. Williams	LB
2004	1	19	19	Miami Dolphins	Vernon Carey	OT
2004	1	21	21	New England Patriots	Vince Wilfork	DT
2004	7	12	213	New York Jets	Darrell McClover	LB
2004	7	14	215	Chicago Bears	Alfonso Marshall	CB
2004	7	53	254	San Diego Chargers	Carlos Joseph	OT
2005	1	8	8	Arizona Cardinals	Antrel Rolle	CB
2005	2	23	55	Buffalo Bills	Roscoe Parrish	WR
2005	3	1	65	San Francisco 49ers	Frank Gore	RB
2005	3	22	86	Buffalo Bills	Kevin Everett	TE
2005	6	26	200	Denver Broncos	Chris Myers	G
2006	1	31	31	Seattle Seahawks	Kelly Jennings	CB
2006	2	3	35	Washington Redskins	Rocky McIntosh	LB
2006	2	12	44	New York Giants	Sinorice Moss	WR
2006	2	25	57	Chicago Bears	Devin Hester	CB
2006	3	2	66	Houston Texans	Eric Winston	OT
2006	3	25	89	Carolina Panthers	Rashad Butler	OT
2006	4	13	110	Cleveland Browns	Leon Williams	LB
2006	4	36	133	Pittsburgh Steelers	Orien Harris	DT
2006	5	21	154	Kansas City Chiefs	Marcus Maxey	CB
2007	1	24	24	New England Patriots	Brandon Meriweather	S
2007	1	25	25	Carolina Panthers	Jon Beason	LB
2007	1	31	31	Chicago Bears	Greg Olsen	TE
2007	4	21	120	Seattle Seahawks	Baraka Atkins	DE
2007	4	28	127	New England Patriots	Kareem Brown	DT
2008	1	31	31	New York Giants	Kenny Phillips	S
2008	2	18	50	Arizona Cardinals	Calais Campbell	DE
2008	3	8	71	Baltimore Ravens	Tavares Gooden	LB
2009	6	3	176	Atlanta Falcons	Spencer Adkins	LB
2010	3	31	95	New Orleans Saints	Jimmy Graham	TE
2010	4	4	102	Houston Texans	Darryl Sharpton	LB
2010	4	30	128	Detroit Lions	Jason Curtis Fox	OT
2010	7	28	235	San Diego Chargers	Dedrick Epps	TE
2011	2	14	46	Denver Broncos	Orlando Franklin	OT
2011	2	28	60	Houston Texans	Brandon Harris	CB
2011	3	15	79	Washington Redskins	Leonard Hankerson	WR
2011	3	17	81	Oakland Raiders	DeMarcus Van Dyke	CB
2011	3	22	86	Kansas City Chiefs	Allen Bailey	DE
2011	4	12	109	Tennessee Titans	Colin McCarthy	LB
2011	6	16	181	Oakland Raiders	Richard Gordon	TE
2011	6	27	192	Atlanta Falcons	Matt Bosher	P
2012	3	9	72	Miami Dolphins	Olivier Vernon	DE
2012	3	23	86	Pittsburgh Steelers	Sean Spence	LB
2012	4	2	97	Miami Dolphins	Lamar Miller	RB
2012	4	5	100	Cleveland Browns	Travis Benjamin	WR
2012	6	28	198	Baltimore Ravens	Tommy Streeter	WR
2012	6	20	200	Philadelphia Eagles	Brandon Washington	G
2013	5	16	149	St. Louis Rams	Brandon McGee	CB
2013	6	21	189	Tampa Bay Buccaneers	Mike James	RB
2014	3	29	93	Jacksonville Jaguars	Brandon Linder	G
2014	6	14	191	Chicago Bears	Pat O'Donnell	P
2014	7	22	237	Buffalo Bills	Seantrel Henderson	OT
2015	1	9	9	New York Giants	Ereck Flowers	OT
2015	1	29	29	Indianapolis Colts	Phillip Dorsett	WR
2015	2	16	48	San Diego Chargers	Denzel Perryman	LB
2015	3	4	68	Oakland Raiders	Clive Walford	TE
2015	3	13	77	Cleveland Browns	Duke Johnson	RB
2015	4	29	128	Oakland Raiders	Jon Feliciano	G
2015	6	36	212	Pittsburgh Steelers	Anthony Chickillo	DE
2016	1	25	25	Pittsburgh Steelers	Artie Burns	CB
2016	4	26	124	Chicago Bears	Deon Bush	S
2017	1	29	29	Cleveland Browns	David Njoku	TE
2017	4	6	113	Los Angeles Chargers	Rayshawn Jenkins	S
2017	5	8	152	Carolina Panthers	Corn Elder	CB
2017	5	35	180	Minnesota Vikings	Danny Isidora	G
2017	6	12	196	New Orleans Saints	Al-Quadin Muhammad	DE
2017	6	31	215	Detroit Lions	Brad Kaaya	QB
2017	7	1	219	Minnesota Vikings	Stacy Coley	WR
2017	7	11	229	San Francisco 49ers	Adrian Colbert	CB
2017	7	22	240	Jacksonville Jaguars	Marquez Williams	FB
2018	3	3	67	Cleveland Browns	Chad Thomas	DE
2018	4	7	107	New York Jets	Chris Herndon	TE
2018	4	12	112	Cincinnati Bengals	Mark Walton	RB
2018	5	2	139	New York Giants	R. J. McIntosh	DT
2018	6	36	210	New England Patriots	Braxton Berrios	WR
2018	7	24	242	Carolina Panthers	Kendrick Norton	DT
2019	4	17	119	Cleveland Browns	Sheldrick Redwine	S
2019	5	20	158	Dallas Cowboys	Mike Jackson Sr.	CB
2019	5	27	165	Dallas Cowboys	Joe Jackson	DE
2019	6	8	181	Buffalo Bills	Jaquan Johnson	CB
2019	6	31	204	Seattle Seahawks	Travis Homer	RB
2020	4	34	140	Jacksonville Jaguars	Shaquille Quarterman	LB
2020	4	38	144	Seattle Seahawks	DeeJay Dallas	RB
2020	5	31	176	Minnesota Vikings	K. J. Osborn	WR
2020	7	31	242	Green Bay Packers	Jonathan Garvin	DE
2021	1	18	18	Miami Dolphins	Jaelan Phillips	DE
2021	1	30	30	Buffalo Bills	Gregory Rousseau	DE
2021	5	3	147	Houston Texans	Brevin Jordan	TE
2021	6	32	216	Pittsburgh Steelers	Quincy Roche	LB
2022	7	13	234	Green Bay Packers	Jonathan Ford	DT
2023	2	25	56	Chicago Bears	Tyrique Stevenson	DB
2023	5	27	162	Indianapolis Colts	Will Mallory	TE
2023	7	29	246	Cincinnati Bengals	D. J. Ivey	DB
2024	3	35	99	Los Angeles Rams	Kamren Kinchens	DB
2024	7	6	226	Arizona Cardinals	Jaden Davis	DB
2024	7	17	237	Cincinnati Bengals	Matt Lee	C
2024	7	32	242	Tennessee Titans	James Williams	DB
2025	1	1	1	Tennessee Titans	Cam Ward	QB
2025	2	18	50	Seattle Seahawks	Elijah Arroyo	TE
2025	5	17	153	Cincinnati Bengals	Jalen Rivers	OG
2025	5	26	162	New York Jets	Francisco Mauigoa	LB
2025	5	40	176	New York Jets	Tyler Baron	DE
2025	6	6	182	New England Patriots	Andrés Borregales	K
2025	7	7	223	Seattle Seahawks	Damien Martinez	RB
2026	1	10	10	New York Giants	Francis Mauigoa	G
2026	1	15	15	Tampa Bay Buccaneers	Rueben Bain Jr.	G
2026	1	22	22	Los Angeles Chargers	Akheem Mesidor	LB
2026	3	1	65	Arizona Cardinals	Carson Beck	QB
2026	3	4	68	Philadelphia Eagles	Markel Bell	OT
2026	3	34	98	Minnesota Vikings	Jakobe Thomas	S
2026	4	16	116	Tampa Bay Buccaneers	Keionte Scott	CB
2026	6	7	188	New York Jets	Anez Cooper	G
2026	6	16	197	Los Angeles Rams	CJ Daniels	WR

=== Notable undrafted players ===
Note: No drafts held before 1920

Debut year	Player name	Debut NFL/AFL team	Position	Notes
1960	Walt Corey	Dallas Texans	LB	—
1960	Charley Diamond	Dallas Texans	T	—
1960	Gary Greaves	Houston Oilers	T	—
1964	Tom Costello	New York Giants	LB	—
1967	John Matlock	New York Jets	C	—
1970	Dave Kalina	Pittsburgh Steelers	WR	—
1973	Mike Burke	Miami Dolphins	P	—
1974	Bill Frohbose	Detroit Lions	DB	—
1978	William Cesare	Tampa Bay Buccaneers	DB	—
1979	Woody Bennett	New York Jets	RB	—
1981	Jim Burt	New York Giants	NT	—
1982	Frank Frazier	San Francisco 49ers	G	—
1983	Charles Cook	New York Giants	DE	—
1983	Leon Evans	Washington Redskins	DE	—
1985	Julio Cortes	Seattle Seahawks	LB	—
1985	Stanley Shakespeare	Cleveland Browns	WR	—
1987	Eric Larkin	Houston Oilers	DE	—
1987	Victor Morris	Miami Dolphins	LB	—
1988	Selwyn Brown	Tampa Bay Buccaneers	DB	—
1988	Jeff Feagles	New England Patriots	P	—
1988	Charles Henry	Los Angeles Raiders	TE	—
1989	Andre Brown	Miami Dolphins	WR	—
1993	Coleman Bell	Miami Dolphins	TE	—
1993	Darryl Spencer	Atlanta Falcons	WR	—
1993	Kipp Vickers	Indianapolis Colts	G	—
1994	Robert Bass	Chicago Bears	LB	—
1996	Dexter Seigler	Seattle Seahawks	DB	—
1997	James Burgess	Kansas City Chiefs	LB	—
1997	K. C. Jones	Denver Broncos	C	—
1997	Earl Little	Miami Dolphins	S	—
1998	Kerlin Blaise	Detroit Lions	G	—
1999	Derrick Ham	Washington Redskins	DE	—
2001	Devin Brown	Jacksonville Jaguars	DB	—
2003	Brett Romberg	Jacksonville Jaguars	C	—
2004	Jarrett Payton	Tennessee Titans	RB	—
2005	Brock Berlin	Miami Dolphins	QB	—
2005	Santonio Thomas	New England Patriots	DT	—
2006	Buck Ortega	Washington Redskins	TE	—
2008	Darnell Jenkins	Houston Texans	WR	—
2009	Antonio Dixon	Washington Redskins	DT	—
2009	Dwayne Hendricks	New York Giants	DT	—
2009	Bruce Johnson	New York Giants	CB	—
2010	Javarris James	Indianapolis Colts	RB	—
2010	Joe Joseph	Tennessee Titans	DT	—
2010	Randy Phillips	Detroit Lions	S	—
2010	Sam Shields	Green Bay Packers	CB	—
2011	Cory Nelms	San Francisco 49ers	CB	—
2012	LaRon Byrd	Arizona Cardinals	WR	—
2012	Chase Ford	Minnesota Vikings	TE	—
2012	Harland Gunn	Dallas Cowboys	G	—
2012	Marcus Forston	New England Patriots	DT	—
2012	Adewale Ojomo	New York Giants	DE	—
2013	Ray-Ray Armstrong	St. Louis Rams	LB	—
2014	Allen Hurns	Jacksonville Jaguars	WR	—
2014	Asante Cleveland	San Francisco 49ers	TE	—
2014	Luther Robinson	Green Bay Packers	DE	—
2014	Erik Swoope	Indianapolis Colts	TE	—
2015	Thurston Armbrister	Jacksonville Jaguars	LB	—
2015	Ladarius Gunter	Green Bay Packers	CB	—
2015	Shane McDermott	Dallas Cowboys	C	—
2015	Olsen Pierre	Chicago Bears	DE	—
2016	Tracy Howard	Cleveland Browns	CB	—
2016	Ufomba Kamalu	Houston Texans	DE	—
2016	Rashawn Scott	Miami Dolphins	WR	—
2016	Herb Waters	Green Bay Packers	CB	—
2017	Jamal Carter	Denver Broncos	S	—
2017	Jermaine Grace	Atlanta Falcons	LB	—
2017	Justin Vogel	Green Bay Packers	P	—
2018	Michael Badgley	Indianapolis Colts	K	—
2018	Dee Delaney	Jacksonville Jaguars	CB	—
2018	Trent Harris	New England Patriots	DL	—
2018	KC McDermott	Jacksonville Jaguars	T	—
2019	Tyree St. Louis	New England Patriots	T	—
2023	Mitchell Agude	Miami Dolphins	LB	—
2023	Lou Hedley	New Orleans Saints	P	—
2024	Javion Cohen	Cleveland Browns	G	—
2024	Branson Deen	Buffalo Bills	DT	—
2024	Leonard Taylor	New York Jets	DT	—
2025	Simeon Barrow	Atlanta Falcons	WR	—
2025	Jacolby George	Carolina Panthers	WR	—
2025	Daryl Porter Jr.	Buffalo Bills	CB	—
2025	Xavier Restrepo	Tennessee Titans	WR	—
2026	Wesley Bissainthe	Kansas City Chiefs	LB	—
2026	David Blay Jr.	New England Patriots	DE	—
2026	James Brockermeyer	Atlanta Falcons	C	—
2026	Keelan Marion	Atlanta Falcons	WR	—
