= Miami Hurricanes football (1926 to 1978) =

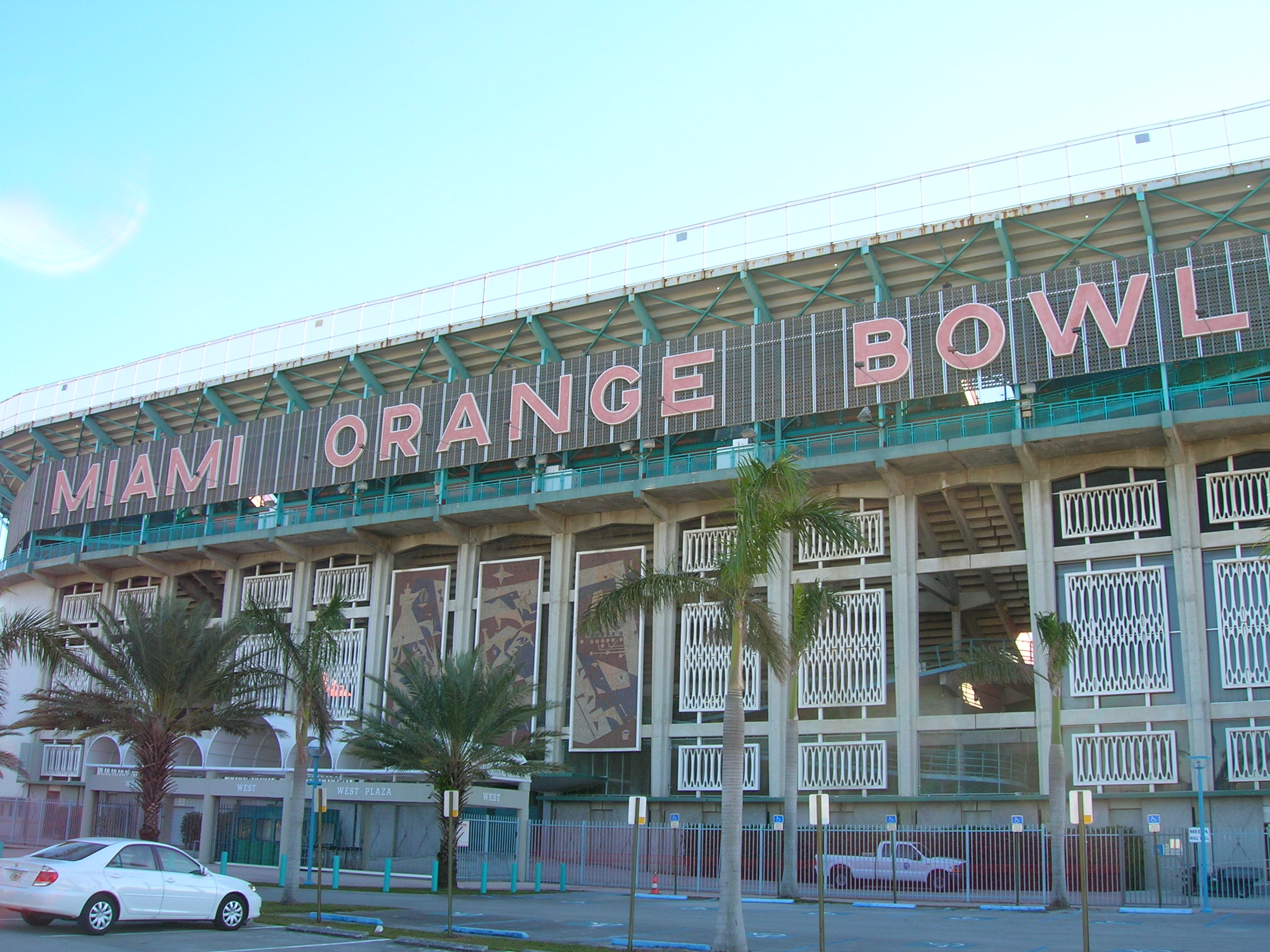
In 1937, eleven years after the founding of their program, the Miami Hurricanes moved into a new home stadium, Burdine Municipal Stadium in Little Havana, renamed the Orange Bowl in 1959; it remained their home stadium through 2007. Over its history, the Orange Bowl hosted five Super Bowls; in 2008, the stadium was demolished.

The Miami Hurricanes football team represents the University of Miami in college football. The program began in 1926. Decades later, in the 1980s, the program emerged as an NCAA Division I national powerhouse, winning five AP national championships in 1983, 1987, 1989, 1991, and 2001. The program also has become a major source for NFL talent. As of 2023, 358 Miami Hurricanes have been selected in the NFL draft, the 13th-most among all collegiate programs.

== 1920s ==
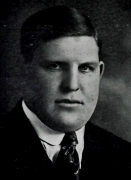
Cub Buck, a former NFL player with the Canton Bulldogs and Green Bay Packers, coached the University of Miami football team in the 1927 and 1928 seasons.

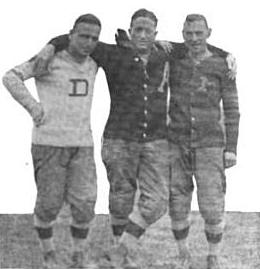
In 1929, J. Burton Rix (on left), former head coach of Southern Methodist, was appointed the second head coach of the Miami Hurricanes football team.

The University of Miami football program began with a freshman team in 1926. The program's first game was a 7–0 victory over Rollins College on October 23, 1926 before 304 fans. Under head coach Howard "Cub" Buck, a former NFL player, the freshman team posted a perfect 8–0 record in its inaugural season. Two of the wins were against the University of Havana, one on Thanksgiving Day in Miami and one in Havana, Cuba, on Christmas Day. Miami's last home game of the season featured the first Hurricane football game played on New Year's Day against Howard at the University of Miami's University Stadium.

The following year, in 1927, the team adopted the official nickname "Miami Hurricanes", though the exact timing and origin of the name is unclear; some reports suggest it was in reference to the devastating power of the 1926 hurricane that postponed the program's first game by a month, and others that it was suggested by a player in response to rumors that university officials wanted to name the team after local flora or fauna.

Varsity competition began in 1927, with the Hurricanes beating Rollins, 39–3, in its first game and going on to a 3–6–1 record.

The team improved to 4–4–1 in 1928, but it was not enough for Buck to keep his job. Buck was replaced prior to the 1929 season with J. Burton Rix, who was previously the head coach at Southern Methodist. Rix's arrival was funded by a group of local businessmen. That off-season, the program, which competed as an independent during its first two years of existence, joined the Southern Intercollegiate Athletic Association (SIAA).

In the 1929 season, the Hurricanes played its first varsity road game, a 14–0 loss at Southwest Louisiana in Lafayette, Louisiana, and Rix led the team to its first winning season, going 3–2. His tenure, however, was short-lived; off-campus financing for the program dried up in the wake of the 1929 stock market crash, and he resigned after one season.

== 1930s ==
Ernest Brett replaced Rix, and in 1930, Miami played Temple in its first game outside the South, losing 34–0 to in a game played in Atlantic City, New Jersey. On October 31, 1930, the Hurricanes played one of the nation's first night games against Bowdon College in Miami.

Brett lasted only one year, and Tom McCann became the program's fourth head coach in 1931.

Under McCann, the football program experienced its most successful seasons to that point. After a difficult first year, the Hurricanes put together a winning record in the 1932 season and served as host to the inaugural Palm Festival, later known as the Orange Bowl, defeating Manhattan College 7–0 at Moore Park in Miami. A 5–1–2 campaign and another Palm Festival berth followed in 1933, and in 1934, the program played in its first official bowl game, losing to Bucknell in the first Orange Bowl, 26–0.

In 1935, a group of University of Miami football supporters sought to hire Red Grange as coach. However, the move was vetoed by President Bowman Foster Ashe, in part because the $7,500 salary that Grange sought was deemed as excessive. Instead, Irl Tubbs took over as head coach in 1935, and though Miami compiled an 11–5–2 record in his two seasons, it did not play in a bowl in either year.

After Irl Tubbs resigned following the 1936 season to become head coach at Iowa, Jack Harding was hired to serve as both head football coach and athletic director at the University of Miami.

In 1937, the Hurricanes moved into the brand new Burdine Municipal Stadium, renamed the Orange Bowl in 1959, located west of Downtown Miami in Little Havana.

The following year, the Hurricanes played archrival Florida for the first time, defeating the Gators 19–7 at Florida Field, and won the program's first Southern Intercollegiate Athletic Association title with an 8–2 record.

The Hurricanes left the SIAA just three years later, and became independent once again.

== 1940s ==
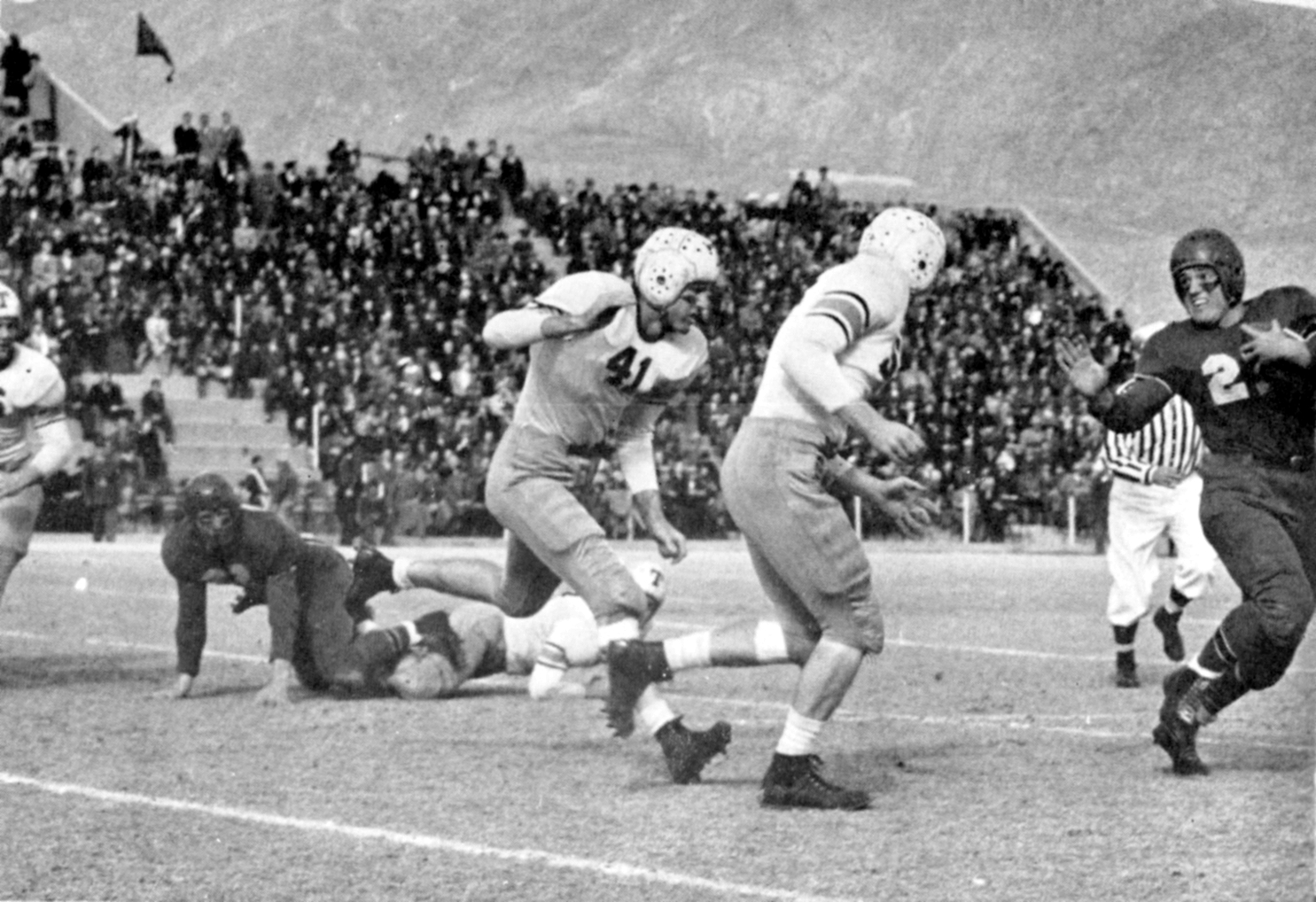
On October 31, 1941, the Hurricanes hosted Texas Tech at Burdine Stadium, later renamed the Miami Orange Bowl.

Harding led the Hurricanes to eight wins in 1941 and seven wins in 1942 prior to being called away for military service during World War II. Eddie Dunn, a former running back for the Hurricanes under Harding, stepped into the void and served as head coach during Harding's two-year war service. Though the Hurricanes won five games in 1943, they faltered in 1944, winning just one game against seven losses and a tie.

Fortunes changed with Harding's return in 1945, as the Hurricanes went 9–1–1 and returned to the Orange Bowl for the first time since 1934, defeating Holy Cross 13–6 in a memorable game. With the score tied 6–6 and only seconds remaining, Holy Cross quarterback Gene DeFilippo was intercepted by Miami's Al Hudson at the 11-yard line. Hudson dashed 89 yards the other way for the game-winning touchdown as time expired.

Harding's Hurricanes won eight games in 1946, but after the team slipped to 2–7–1 in 1947, he resigned as head coach, but continued as athletic director.

Harding hired Andy Gustafson as the new head coach, closing out a nine-year tenure in which the Hurricanes registered a 54–29–3 record and won at least eight games in four different seasons.

== 1950s ==
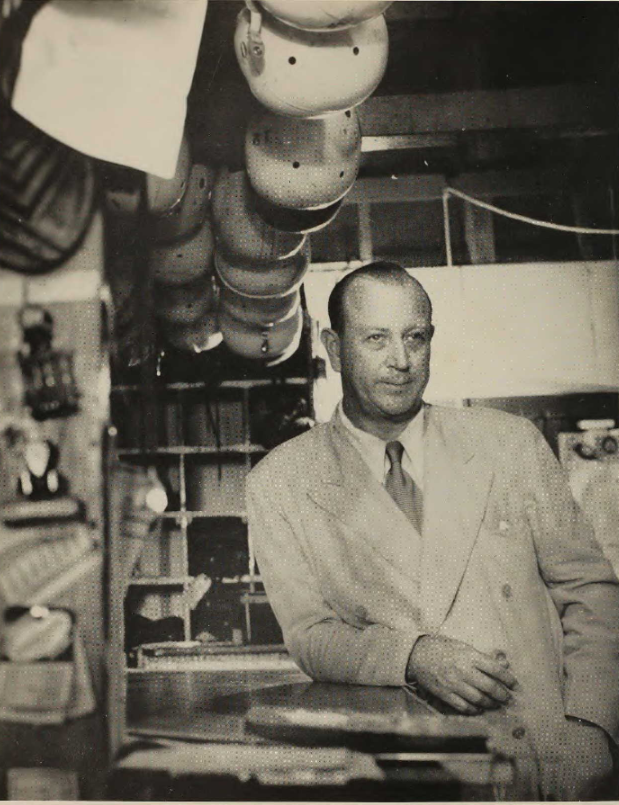
Andy Gustafson, head coach of the Miami Hurricanes from 1948 to 1963

One of Andy Gustafson's major innovations at the University of Miami was the "drive series" offense, an option-oriented attack from the Split-T formation that relied on zone blocking and featured either a fullback fake or carry on every play. Under Gustafson's tutelage, Miami produced its first All-American, Al Carapella, in 1950 and went 9–1–1 in 1951, including a 35–13 win in its first-ever game against rival Florida State and a 15–14 loss to Clemson in the Orange Bowl.

The following season, the Hurricanes won eight games and went to a bowl game in consecutive years for the first time in school history, shutting out Clemson 14–0 in a rematch at the Gator Bowl.

In the middle of the 1954 season, the NCAA imposed two one-year penalties against the Hurricanes for providing transportation and tryouts to prospective players. As a result, Gustafson's 1954 squad was ineligible to play in a bowl game, and the 8–1 Hurricanes, whose lone loss came 14–13 at No. 14 Auburn, finished the season ranked ninth in the Coaches' Poll, the first top ten poll finish in school history.

Two years later, in 1956, an 8–1–1 Miami Hurricanes team, led by team captain and All-American Don Bosseler, was under consideration to play in the Sugar Bowl, but the program's bowl-ban was not due to expire until ten days after the game, rendering it ineligible to participate. The team finished the season ranked sixth in both the AP and Coaches' Polls.

== 1960s ==
In the later years of Gustafson's tenure, two-time All-America quarterback George Mira guided the Hurricanes to berths in the 1961 Liberty Bowl and the 1962 Gotham Bowl, where they lost both games.

In 1963, the team struggled to a 3–7 record. Mira set many of the school's passing records during his four years at the University of Miami, appeared on the cover of Sports Illustrated, and finished fifth in the Heisman Trophy voting as a senior.

Following the season, Gustafson decided to step down as head coach and Charlie Tate, an assistant at Georgia Tech, was hired to replace him. Gustafson has the Hurricane record for most years as head coach (16) and most wins (93). Charlie Tate's first seasons at Miami were uneventful, with the team posting a 4–5–1 record in 1964 and a reverse 5–4–1 record in 1965. 1966 brought the arrival of defensive end Ted Hendricks, the only three-time All-American in school history, and the Hurricanes won eight games, earning a trip to the Liberty Bowl, where they defeated No. 9 Virginia Tech, 14–7.

In December 1966, the program was integrated when African American wide receiver Ray Bellamy signed a letter of intent to play football at the university. The Hurricanes returned to bowl play in 1967, dropping the Bluebonnet Bowl to Colorado, 31–21. The Hurricanes had a 5–5–0 season in 1968 and 4–6–0 in 1969.

== 1970 to 1978 ==
Tate resigned as head coach two games into the 1970 season, later citing burn out and fatigue from "fighting the money battle and other battles" as the basis for his decision. Walt Kichefski, an assistant on Tate's staff, was elevated to head coach in the wake of Tate's resignation and coached the team to a 3–8 record in 1970. He was not retained the following season.

On December 20, 1970, Fran Curci, a former All-American quarterback for the Hurricanes under Andy Gustafson, was named as the program's new head coach.

Curci's 1971 team improved by a game, but the rival Florida Gators defeated the Hurricanes in a game that came to be known as the "Florida Flop." The Gators led throughout the game and were up 45–8 when John Reaves threw an interception to the Hurricanes' defense with little time left in the fourth quarter. Reaves needed just 15 more passing yards to break the NCAA record for career passing yards. But with time winding down and the Hurricanes driving in Florida territory, there was a good chance the Gators offense would not get the ball back. After the Hurricanes' snap at the Florida 8 yard line, nearly all the Gators defensive players "flopped" down on the field. University of Miami quarterback John Hornibrook walked in untouched for a touchdown. A few minutes later, Reaves got his record as time expired. Curci called the incident "the worst thing I have ever seen in football."

1972 brought another memorable finish for the Hurricanes, when the inadvertent gift of a "fifth down" by officials enabled the Hurricanes to edge Tulane in the waning moments of the game for a 24–21 win. Curci left the program at the conclusion of the season and was replaced by Pete Elliot.

Elliot, in turn, lasted two seasons and stepped down in 1975 to become the University of Miami's athletic director. Offensive coordinator Carl Selmer was named the program's fifth head coach in six years. Under Selmer, a trend that started earlier in the decade continued, with home attendance declining every year. After finishing 2–8 in 1975 and 3–8 in 1976, the university fired Selmer, citing concerns about dwindling attendance and the loss of local blue-chip recruits to other schools.

After a national search, Lou Saban, formerly head coach of the NFL's Buffalo Bills, Denver Broncos, and Boston Patriots, was hired on December 27, 1976, as head coach. The Hurricanes won only three games in 1977, but Saban was able to put together a well-regarded recruiting class that included future Pro Football Hall of Fame quarterback Jim Kelly from East Brady, Pennsylvania. Kelly had been recruited by Penn State as a linebacker and agreed to come to the University of Miami after Saban promised him he would play quarterback.

Among the other 30 signees in Saban's first recruiting class were 11 future NFL players. The Hurricanes improved by three games in Saban's second season and Ottis Anderson emerged as an NFL talent. Anderson became the first University of Miami running back to rush for 1,000 yards in a season and led the team in rushing for three straight seasons from 1977 through 1979. Anderson set numerous school rushing records and was the Hurricane's career rushing leader until 2014, when he was overtaken by Duke Johnson.

After just two seasons as head coach, Saban resigned in the wake of a controversy concerning football players throwing a Jewish man into Lake Osceola, the on campus lake.

Saban left after the 1978 season to take the head coaching position at Army.
