= Independence Middle School =

Independence Middle School may refer to:

- Independence Middle School (Jupiter, Florida)
- Independence Middle School (Independence, Ohio)
