= Zahra Hazari =

Physics education researcher

- Born: Toronto, Ontario, Canada
- Occupation: Professor
- Awards: National Science Foundation (NSF) CAREER Award

Academic background
- Education: BS, Physics and Mathematics, Florida Atlantic University; MS, PhD, 2006, University of Toronto
- Thesis: Gender differences in introductory university physics performance: the influence of high school physics preparation and affect. (2006)

Academic work
- Institutions: Florida International University; Clemson University

Zahra Sana Hazari is a physics education researcher, and a professor in the Department of Teaching and Learning and the STEM Transformation Institute at the Florida International University.

== Early life and education ==
Hazari was raised in Delray Beach, Florida where she attended Atlantic Community High School where her love for physics began. She excelled so much so that her teacher would have her tutor other students in the subject. Following high school, she attended Florida Atlantic University and was awarded the $2,500 Stan and Renee Wimberly scholarship for being a straight-A student. Following her undergraduate degree, where she received a B.S in physics and mathematics, Hazari moved to Ontario and enrolled at the University of Toronto for her Master's degree and PhD. She received an M.S in physics and then went on to earn her PhD in physics education. Her dissertation was titled Gender Differences in Introductory University Physics Performance: The Influence of High School Physics Preparation and Effect.

== Career ==
Following her PhD and postdoctoral fellowship at Harvard–Smithsonian Center for Astrophysics, Hazari joined the faculty at Clemson University. As an assistant professor of engineering and science education, she received a 2009 National Science Foundation (NSF) CAREER Award "to study ways to improve physics classes for high school students, particularly young women." In the same year, Hazari won Best Paper in the Education Research and Methods Division at the American Society for Engineering Education Conference.

Hazari eventually left Clemson to accept a similar faculty appointment at Florida International University (FIU). While at Florida International University Hazari's research goals hope to improve the environment in physics for minoritized groups, namely women. At Florida International University she has taught courses in "physics, mathematics(calculus), science methods for pre-service/in-service teachers, history of science as well as mathematics and research methods for graduate students."

During her early tenure at the school, she collaborated with Jennifer D. Cribbs, Philip M. Sadler, and Gerhard Sonnert to publish Establishing an Explanatory Model for Mathematics Identity. The result of the journal suggested that interest and recognition were stronger factors in help students become "math persons" than confidence. Two years later, she received NSF funding to establish a programme that develops material to add to high-school curricula to inspire female students to pursue physics at university. The programme, called STEP UP, was run in collaboration with Texas A&M University-Commerce, the American Physical Society (APS), and the American Association of Physics Teachers.

During the COVID-19 pandemic, Hazari was elected a fellow of the APS for "identifying and dismantling barriers women and people of diverse backgrounds face in STEM fields." She also received a Public Choice recognition at the 2021 NSF STEM for All Video Showcase for her efforts with STEP UP. Furthermore she has served on multiple committees and editorial boards for her success in research.

== Research ==
Hazari's published research focuses mainly on science and identity. In her early work, she had to do a lot of research around how we define certain words or ideas, such as identity and how we could then go about measuring that. After that preliminary work she then moved onto case work. She has since then published multiple research papers, such as "Stability and Volatility of STEM Career Interest in High School: A Gender Study", Out-of-School Time Science Activities and Their Association with Career Interest in STEM, and Identity, Critical Agency, and Engineering: An Affective Model for Predicting Engineering as a Career Choice. All of these publications look into why women are so underrepresented in physics and what can be done to change that.

== Awards ==
- National Science Foundation (NSF) CAREER Award
- Collaborative Research: Mobilizing Teachers to Increase Capacity and Broaden Women's Participation in Physics
