= Joe Looney =

Joe Looney may refer to:

- Joe Don Looney (1942–1988), American football running back
- Joe Looney (offensive lineman) (born 1990), American football offensive lineman
