= Spady Cultural Heritage Museum =

Coordinates: 26.4646°N 80.07844°W

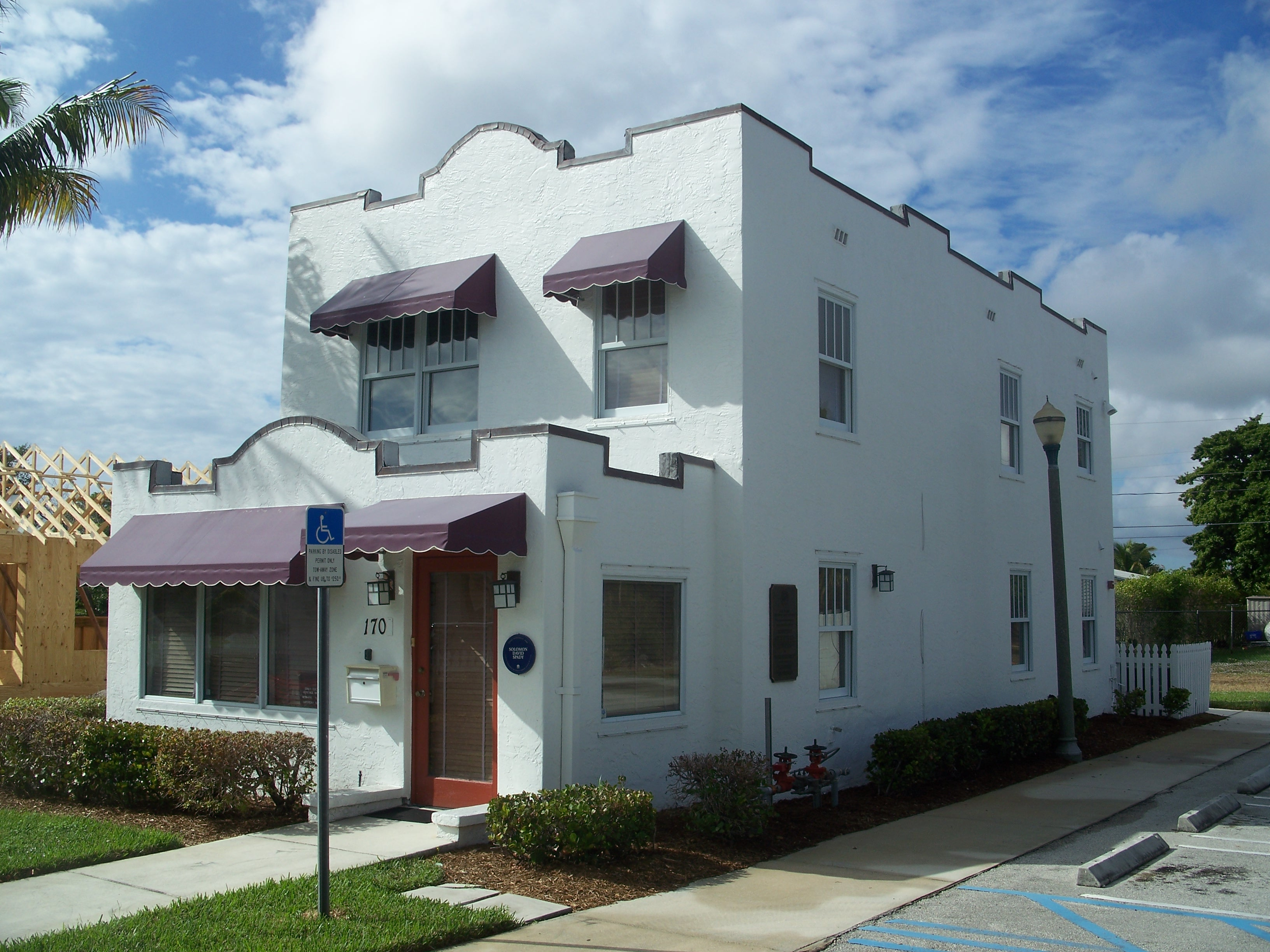
Spady Cultural Heritage Museum

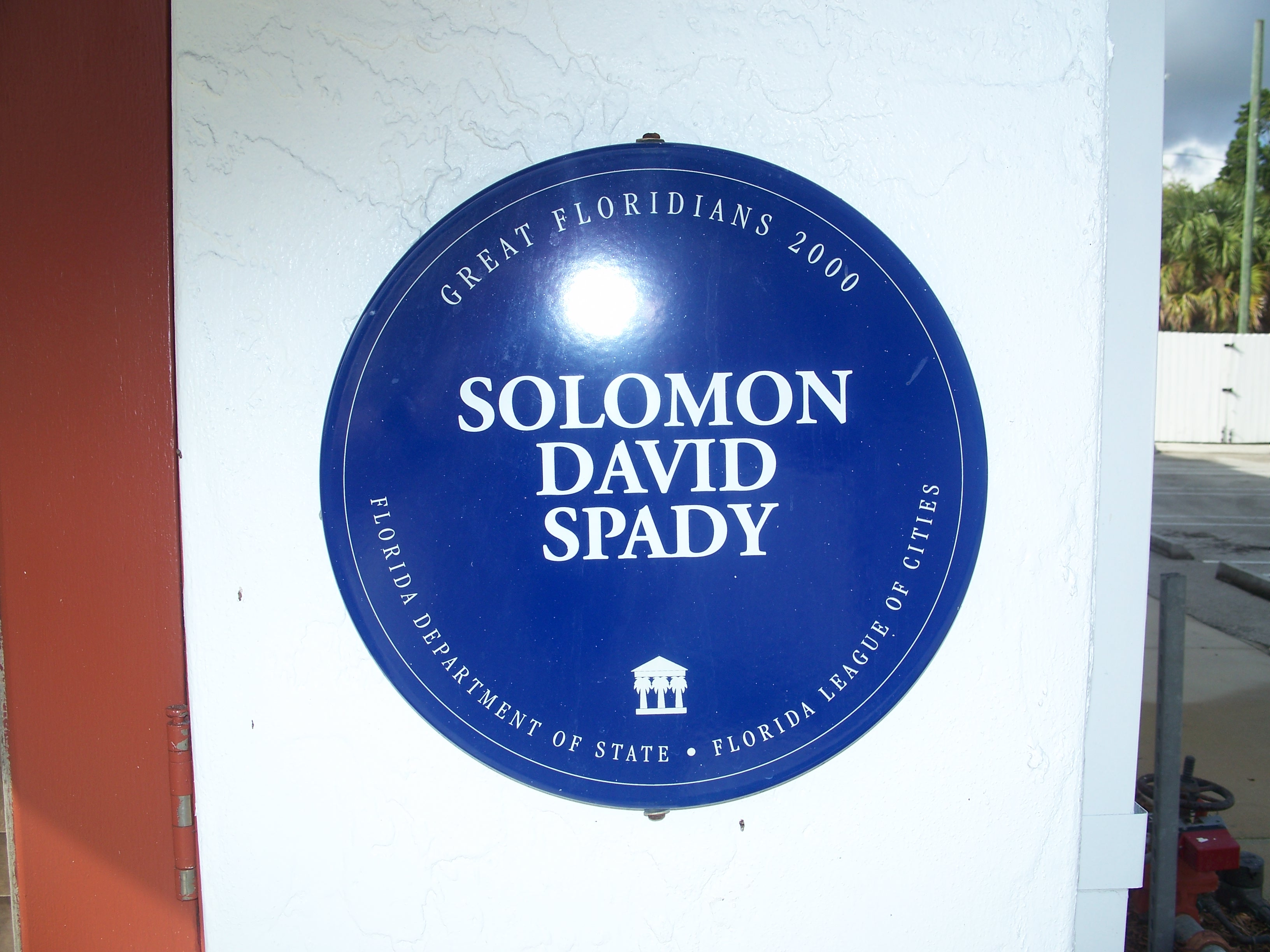
Solomon Spady Great Floridian plaque at the Spady Cultural Heritage Museum

Spady Cultural Heritage Museum is a museum of African-American history in Delray Beach, Palm Beach County, Florida. It is housed in the former home of the late Solomon David Spady, a prominent African-American educator and community leader in Delray Beach from 1922 to 1957. The museum opened in July 2001 and is funded by the Delray Beach Community Redevelopment Agency, Cultural Council of Palm Beach County, and the State of Florida. The museum is located at 170 NW Fifth Avenue in the historic West Settlers District of Delray Beach.

Spady was a student of George Washington Carver, who, referred by Booker T. Washington, became a school teacher and was principal of Delray County Training School from 1922 to 1957. He inspired children and encouraged them to go to college. He is on the list of Great Floridians.

The Spady Museum's community and cultural partners include the Community Redevelopment Agency of Delray Beach, the City of Delray Beach, the Florida African American Heritage Preservation Network, Florida Atlantic University, Palm Beach County Cultural Council, and Broward Attractions and Museum Month.

The museum hosts a Saturday school for students to buttress their knowledge about historic African Americans in the state and African American history based on the Faith in Florida curriculum.
