= 1984 All-South Independent football team =

American college football season

The 1984 All-South Independent football team consists of American football players chosen by the Associated Press for their All-South independent teams for the 1984 NCAA Division I-A football season.

== Offense ==
=== Quarterbacks ===
- Bernie Kosar, Miami (AP-1)
- Ed Rubbert, Louisville (AP-2)

=== Running backs ===
- Greg Allen, Florida State (AP-1)
- Alonzo Highsmith, Miami (AP-1)
- James "Punkin" Williams, Memphis (AP-2)
- Thomas Dendy, South Carolina (AP-2)

=== Wide receivers ===
- Eddie Brown, Miami (AP-1)
- Jessie Hester, Florida State (AP-1)
- Ira Hillary, South Carolina (AP-2)
- Stanley Shakespeare, Miami (AP-2)

=== Tight ends ===
- Willie Smith, Miami (AP-1)
- Joe Jones, Virginia Tech (AP-2)

=== Offensive tackles ===
- Tim Long, Memphis (AP-1)
- Dave Heffernan, Miami (AP-1)
- Fred Richards, Southern Miss (AP-2)
- John Ionata, Florida State (AP-2)

=== Offensive guards ===
- Del Wilkes, South Carolina (AP-1)
- Jamie Dukes, Florida State (AP-1)
- Chris Boudreaux, Louisiana-Lafayette (AP-2)
- Tom Mehr, Virginia Tech (AP-2)

=== Centers ===
- Greg Planko, Louisville (AP-1)
- Mark Johnson, Virginia Tech (AP-2)

== Defense ==
=== Defensive ends ===
- Tim Harris, Memphis (AP-1)
- Richard Byrd, Southern Miss (AP-1)
- Jesse Penn, Virginia Tech (AP-2)
- Eric Fairs, Memphis (AP-2)
- Curtis Wyatt, East Carolina (AP-2)

=== Defensive tackles ===
- Bruce Smith, Virginia Tech (AP-1)
- Kevin Fagan, Miami (AP-1)
- Isaac Williams, Florida State (AP-2)
- Charles "Gator" Bennett, Louisiana-Lafayette (AP-2)

=== Linebackers ===
- James Seawright, South Carolina (AP-1)
- Henry Taylor, Florida State (AP-1)
- Bruce Fleming, Miami (AP-1)
- Paul Vogel, South Carolina (AP-2)
- Burnell Dent, Tulane (AP-2)
- Steve Spinelia, Louisiana-Lafayette (AP-2)

=== Defensive backs ===
- Bryant Gilliard, South Carolina (AP-1)
- Ashley Lee, Virginia Tech (AP-1)
- Derrick Burroughs, Memphis (AP-1)
- Joe Brooks, South Carolina (AP-1)
- Darrell Fullington, Miami (AP-2)
- Kevin Walker, East Carolina (AP-2)
- Donnie Elder, Memphis (AP-2)
- Benny Burst, Tulane (AP-2)

== Special teams ==
=== Kickers ===
- Derek Schmidt, Florida State (AP-1)
- Don Glosson, Memphis (AP-2)

=== Punters ===
- Louis Berry, Florida State (AP-1)
- David Cox, Virginia Tech (AP-2)
