= Keni-H Lovely =

American football player (born 2000)

Profile
- Position: Cornerback

Personal information
- Born: May 12, 2000 (age 26); Boynton Beach, Florida, U.S.
- Listed height: 5 ft 10 in (1.78 m)
- Listed weight: 182 lb (83 kg)

Career information
- High school: William T. Dwyer (2014) (Palm Beach Gardens, Florida); Atlantic Community High (2017–2018) (Delray Beach, Florida)
- College: Western Michigan (2018–2023)
- NFL draft: 2024: undrafted

Career history
- Buffalo Bills (2024)*; Michigan Panthers (2025); Arizona Cardinals (2025)*; Jacksonville Jaguars (2025)*
- * Offseason or practice squad member only

Awards and highlights
- 2x Third-Team All-MAC (2022, 2023)
- Stats at Pro Football Reference

Keni-H Lovely (born May 12, 2000) is an American professional football cornerback. He was previously signed with NFL teams including the Buffalo Bills and the Arizona Cardinals and the Michigan Panthers of the United Football League (UFL). He played college football for the Western Michigan Broncos.

== Early life ==
Lovely was born on May 12, 2000. He was one of four sons born to Roslyn Banks and Kenneth Lovely. Lovely played cornerback at William T. Dwyer High School as a member of the Panthers football team in 2014. He later transferred in 2017 to the Atlantic Community High School where he played cornerback and defensive back for the Atlantic Eagles team. Lovely was rated a three-star recruit and received 14 collegiate scholarship offers. Lovely also lettered in track and field at Atlantic Community High.

== College career ==
In 2018, Lovely played as a cornerback at Western Michigan University as a member of the WMU Broncos team. From 2018 to 2023, Lovely played in 42 games, recording 107 total tackles and 6 interceptions. In the final two seasons of his college career, Lovely was named Third-Team All-MAC. While at WMU, Lovely majored in sports management.

== Professional career ==
Pre-draft measurables
Height	Weight	Arm length	Hand span	Wingspan	40-yard dash	10-yard split	20-yard split	20-yard shuttle	Three-cone drill	Vertical jump	Broad jump	Bench press
5 ft 10 in (1.78 m)	182 lb (83 kg)	30 1/2 in (0.77 m)	8 7/8 in (0.23 m)	6 ft 2 1/8 in (1.88 m)	4.37 s	1.58 s	2.50 s	4.26 s	6.93 s	38.5 in (0.98 m)	10 ft 3 in (3.12 m)	13 reps
All values from Pro Day

=== Buffalo Bills ===
Lovely was signed by the Buffalo Bills as an undrafted rookie free agent on May 10, 2024. He was later waived by the Bills on August 27.

=== Michigan Panthers ===
Lovely joined the United Football League upon signing with the Michigan Panthers on December 12, 2024. He played in nine games for the Panthers, recording three start games, 26 total tackles and nine pass breakups.

=== Arizona Cardinals ===
At the end of the UFL season, Lovely was signed by the Arizona Cardinals on July 28, 2025 before being waived on August 7.

=== Jacksonville Jaguars ===
On August 13, 2025, Lovely signed with the Jacksonville Jaguars. He made his playing debut in a preseason game against the Miami Dolphins during which he recorded five tackles. Lovely was waived on August 26, as a part of final roster cuts. He was re-signed to the team's practice squad the following day.

Lovely signed a reserve/future contract with Jacksonville on January 12, 2026. On August 11, Lovely was waived by the Jaguars.

== Personal life ==
Lovely is the youngest of four brothers. His eldest brother Kennard Banks played college football at Western Michigan in 2005 and Iowa State in 2008. Lovely's second eldest brother James Looney played a single season of college football at Wake Forest in 2013 before transferring to California where he played three more seasons from 2015 to 2017. Looney went on to be selected in the 2018 NFL Draft by the Green Bay Packers. Lovely's third elder brother Joe Looney played college football for Wake Forest from 2008 to 2011 prior to being selected in the fourth round of the 2012 NFL Draft by the San Francisco 49ers.
