= Lake Worth Community High School =

Location
- 1701 Lake Worth Rd; Lake Worth Beach, Florida; United States

Information
- Type: Public (Choice) Secondary - Title I
- Established: 1922
- School district: School District of Palm Beach County
- Principal: Pamela Cosme
- Teaching staff: 149.50 (FTE)
- Grades: 9–12
- Enrollment: 2,612 (2023-2024)
- Student to teacher ratio: 17.47
- Campus: Urban
- Colors: Maroon and white
- Mascot: Trojans - Troy Trojan
- Rival: John I Leonard, Santaluces
- Accreditation: Florida State Department of Education
- Website: https://lwhs.palmbeachschools.org/

Lake Worth Community High School is a public high school located in Lake Worth Beach, Florida. Established in 1922 as Lake Worth High School, it is currently one of Palm Beach County's largest schools.

The Palm Beach County School Board added the word "Community" to the names of all public high schools, including Lake Worth High School, in the 1980s.

== Notable alumni ==
- LaVon Brazill, Former American football player (National Football League - NFL) with the Indianapolis colts (Class of 2007)
- Daniel Cane, co-creator of Blackboard Learning Management Systems
- Mark Foley, former member of the United States House of Representatives (Class of 1973)
- Deidre Hall and Andrea Hall, twin sisters; both stars of the soap opera Days of Our Lives (Class of 1965)
- Scott Henderson, award-winning jazz guitarist (Class of 1972)
- Scott Levy, professional wrestler known as Raven (Class of 1982)
- James Looney, NFL player
- Joe Looney, professional NFL football player for the Dallas Cowboys (Class of 2008)
- Robert W. McKnight, former Florida State Senator and Representative (Class of 1962)
- Herb Score, former MLB All-Star and 1955 American League Rookie of the Year for the Cleveland Indians and Chicago White Sox (Class of 1952)
- Stanley Shakespeare, Former American football player (National Football League - NFL)
- Mayo Smith, former Major League baseball player and manager (Class of 1932)
- Otis Thorpe, former Providence College Friar and NBA basketball player for the Kansas City Kings (Class of 1980)
- Thomas Keller, American chef, cookbook author, and owner of three-Michelin-star restaurant The French Laundry (Class of 1973)
