= Orlando Franklin =

Jamaican-born American football player (born 1987)

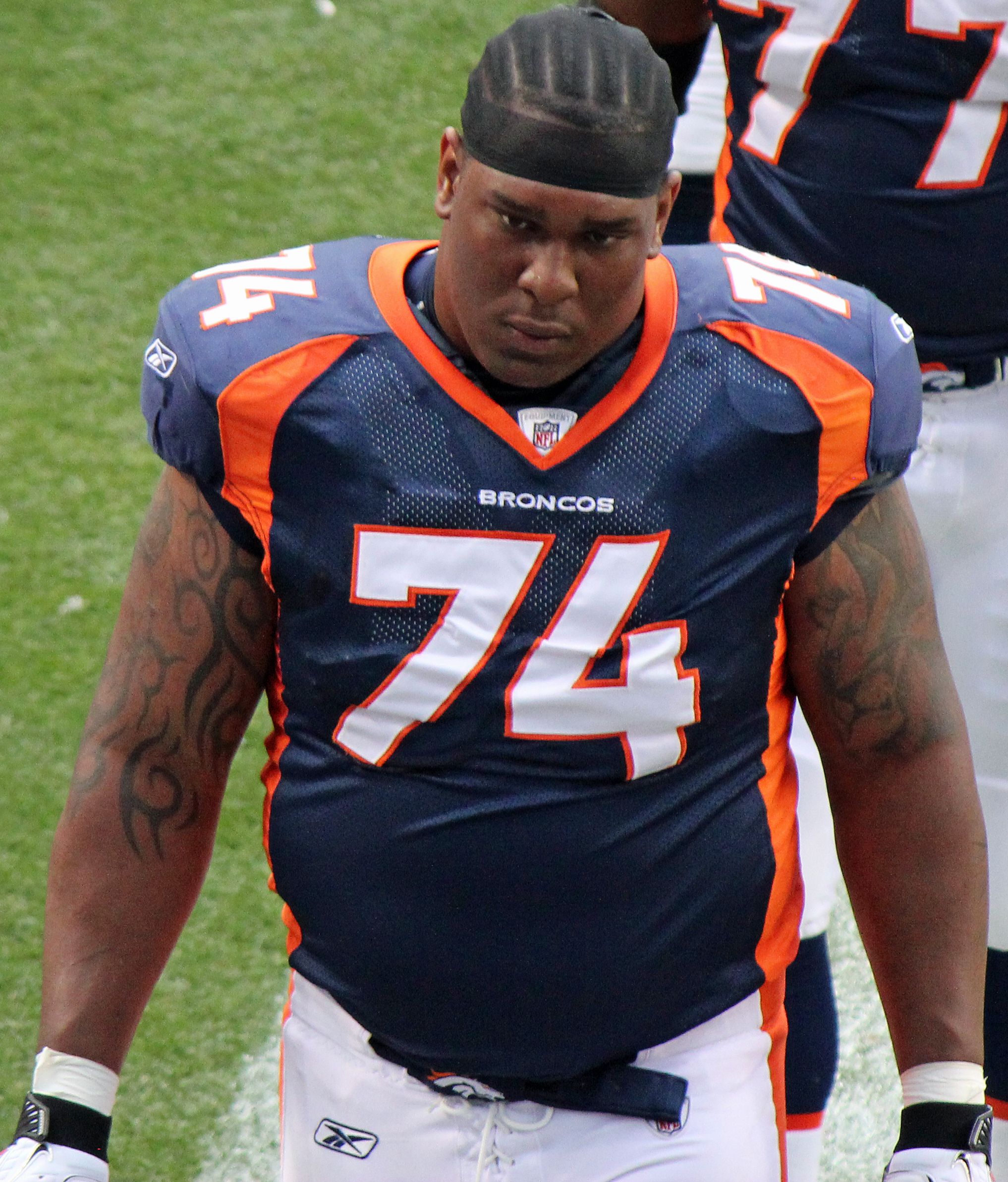
- Franklin with the Denver Broncos in 2011

No. 74
- Position: Offensive tackle

Personal information
- Born: December 16, 1987 (age 38); Kingston, Jamaica
- Listed height: 6 ft 6 in (1.98 m)
- Listed weight: 315 lb (143 kg)

Career information
- High school: Atlantic Community (Delray Beach, Florida, U.S.)
- College: Miami (FL)
- NFL draft: 2011: 2nd round, 46th overall pick

Career history
- Denver Broncos (2011–2014); San Diego Chargers (2015–2016); New Orleans Saints (2017)*; Washington Redskins (2017–2018)
- * Offseason or practice squad member only

Awards and highlights
- Second-team All-ACC (2010)

Career NFL statistics
- Games played: 90
- Games started: 89
- Stats at Pro Football Reference

Orlando D. Franklin (born December 16, 1987) is a Jamaican-born former professional American football offensive tackle who played in the National Football League (NFL). He played college football at the University of Miami, and was selected by the Denver Broncos in the second round of the 2011 NFL draft. He was also a member of the San Diego Chargers, New Orleans Saints, and Washington Redskins.

== Early life ==
Born in Kingston, Jamaica, Franklin was raised in Toronto from the age of three. Franklin and his mother later moved to Florida where he played football in high school, attending Atlantic Community High School in Delray Beach, Florida. At Atlantic Community High School, he was a teammate of Courtney Robinson, Jayron Hosley, and Preston Parker.

== College career ==
Franklin attended the University of Miami from 2007 to 2010. He started 39 of 51 games at both offensive tackle and guard.

== Professional career ==
Pre-draft measurables
Height	Weight	Arm length	Hand span	Wingspan	40-yard dash	10-yard split	20-yard split	Three-cone drill	Vertical jump	Broad jump	Bench press
6 ft 5 1/2 in (1.97 m)	316 lb (143 kg)	35 in (0.89 m)	11 1/8 in (0.28 m)	6 ft 9 7/8 in (2.08 m)	5.20 s	1.89 s	3.05 s	8.37 s	30.0 in (0.76 m)	8 ft 9 in (2.67 m)	26 reps
All values from 2011 NFL Scouting Combine/Pro Day

=== Denver Broncos ===
Franklin was selected with the 14th pick in the 2nd round, 46th overall, by the Denver Broncos in the 2011 NFL draft (previously traded by the Miami Dolphins in exchange for Brandon Marshall).

As a rookie, Franklin started all 16 games for the Broncos. In 2012, Franklin was a starter for all 16 games of the regular season at right tackle. Franklin started 15 games in 2013. He helped the Broncos reach Super Bowl XLVIII, only to lose against the Seattle Seahawks 43–8. He again started all 16 games in 2014.

=== San Diego Chargers ===
On March 10, 2015, Franklin agreed to a five-year contract with the San Diego Chargers.

On May 15, 2017, Franklin was released by the Chargers, after just two years into the five-year deal.

=== New Orleans Saints ===
On July 27, 2017, Franklin signed with the New Orleans Saints, only to be released just five days later.

=== Washington Redskins ===
On October 28, 2017, Franklin was signed by the Washington Redskins. On November 4, Franklin was released by the Redskins. On January 19, 2018, he signed a reserve/future contract with the Redskins. He was released on May 3. Two days later, he announced his retirement, citing his health and the inability to see his family, who live in Denver, as the primary reasons.

== Post-retirement ==
Franklin co-hosted various sports-talk radio programs for 104.3 The Fan in Denver. After serving a coaching internship with the San Francisco 49ers during the summer of 2021, Franklin joined the 49ers coaching staff during the 2021 NFL season, working closely with his father-in-law Bobby Turner. After that season, Franklin returned to KKFN in June 2022. He was let go from KKFN-FM in September 2023. In August 2023, Franklin signed with ESPN to serve as an analyst for the ACC Network.
