= George Washington Carver High School (Delray Beach, Florida) =

Former segregated public school in Florida, U.S.

Coordinates: 26.4554°N 80.0866°W

- 301 SW 14th Ave; Delray Beach, Florida; U.S.

Information
- Former name: Delray County Training School; Palm Beach County Training School
- Type: Public, colored
- Nickname: Pirates
- Website: carverhighschool.org/delray_beach-fl/

George Washington Carver High School was a public secondary school in Delray Beach, Florida. It served as the high school for black students in Delray Beach until the public schools were integrated in 1970.

== History ==
=== Early history ===
Colored School Number 4, Delray, opened in 1896 and closed in 1907. In 1914, William Robinson wrote to Booker T. Washington for advice on how to get the school reopened. At Washington's request, Clarence Walker came to an abandoned schoolhouse in Delray and opened the Delray County Training School using the Smith-Hughes National Vocational Education Act of 1917, which was devised to encourage agricultural training. From 1922 to 1957, Solomon Spady served as teacher and principal. Spady, a student of George Washington Carver, was also recommended by Washington. In 1937, the school was renamed George Washington Carver High School and expanded to include grades 1 through 12. The first 12th-grade graduation came in 1939. Agriculture was an important part of the curriculum, and the students farmed a 10-acre plot adjacent to the school and sold the produce to the public. The school moved to its current location in 1958, and the old campus became S. D. Spady Elementary School. A Montessori magnet program, intended to bring white students to the predominantly black school, has been in place at the elementary school since 1989.

=== After integration ===
In 1970, the school was merged with the all-white Seacrest High School to form Atlantic Community High School. The old high school became George Washington Carver Middle School. When a new middle school serving Delray Beach opened in 1994, the Carver name was transferred to it. The old campus was renamed the Delray Full Service Center. Buildings on the campus later fell into such disrepair that the Palm Beach County School District decided to tear them down. In response to the proposed demolition, graduates formed a Preservation Society, which has lobbied officials and raised money to preserve Building #1 (the classrooms and administrative building), Building #12, the cafetorium, and the gym, called The Hangar because it looked like an airplane hangar. Solomon Spady's house on Northwest 5th Avenue was the first residence on the west side of Swinton Avenue to have electricity and plumbing, and now serves as a center of African-American history. It is called the Spady Cultural Heritage Museum.

== Athletics ==
Carver competed in the Florida Interscholastic Athletic Association, winning two state championships in football. In 1947, Carver was the first black school in the state to host a track meet.
