= Jayron Hosley =

American football player (born 1990)

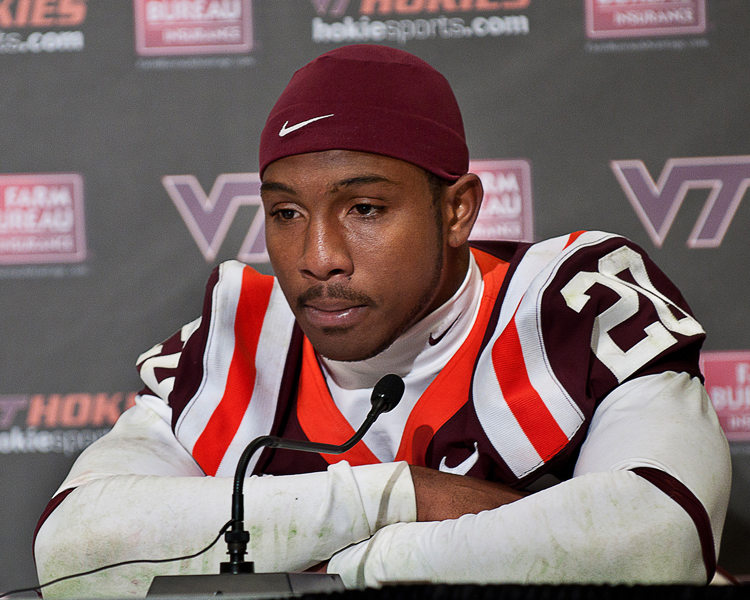
- Hosley talks to the press after Virginia Tech's game against Clemson in 2011.

No. 28
- Position: Cornerback

Personal information
- Born: September 18, 1990 (age 36); Boynton Beach, Florida, U.S.
- Listed height: 5 ft 10 in (1.78 m)
- Listed weight: 178 lb (81 kg)

Career information
- College: Virginia Tech
- NFL draft: 2012: 3rd round, 94th overall pick

Career history
- New York Giants (2012–2015)

Awards and highlights
- First-team All-American (2010); First-team All-ACC (2010); Second-team All-ACC (2011)

Career NFL statistics
- Total tackles: 90
- Forced fumbles: 1
- Fumble recoveries: 1
- Pass deflections: 13
- Interceptions: 2
- Stats at Pro Football Reference

Jayron Todd Hosley (born September 18, 1990) is an American former professional football player who was a cornerback for the New York Giants of the National Football League (NFL). He played college football for the Virginia Tech Hokies.

== Early life ==
He attended Atlantic Community High School in Delray Beach, Florida, where he was a teammate of Orlando Franklin and Karnell Hatcher. Regarded as a four-star recruit by Rivals.com, Hosley was ranked as the No. 11 cornerback prospect of his class.

== College career ==
As a sophomore in 2010, Hosley recorded 39 tackles, seven pass breakups, and nation leading nine interceptions. This performance earned him first-team All-American honors from Scout.com and Walter Camp Football Foundation.

== Professional career ==
Hosley was selected with the 94th overall pick in the third round of the 2012 NFL draft by the Giants. He recorded his first interception on September 20, 2012, on a pass by Carolina Panthers quarterback Cam Newton. Hosley made 12 appearances (including six starts) for the Giants during his rookie campaign, recording one interception, four pass deflections, one forced fumble, one fumble recovery, and 40 combined tackles.

Hosley played in 11 games (starting one) for New York in the 2013 season, logging two pass deflections and nine combined tackles. He made six appearances (including two starts) for the Giants in 2014, recording one pass deflection and eight combined tackles.

In 2015, Hosley played in a career-high 14 games (including 11 starts), in which he compiled one interception, six pass deflections, and 33 combined tackles.
