= James Looney =

American football player (born 1995)

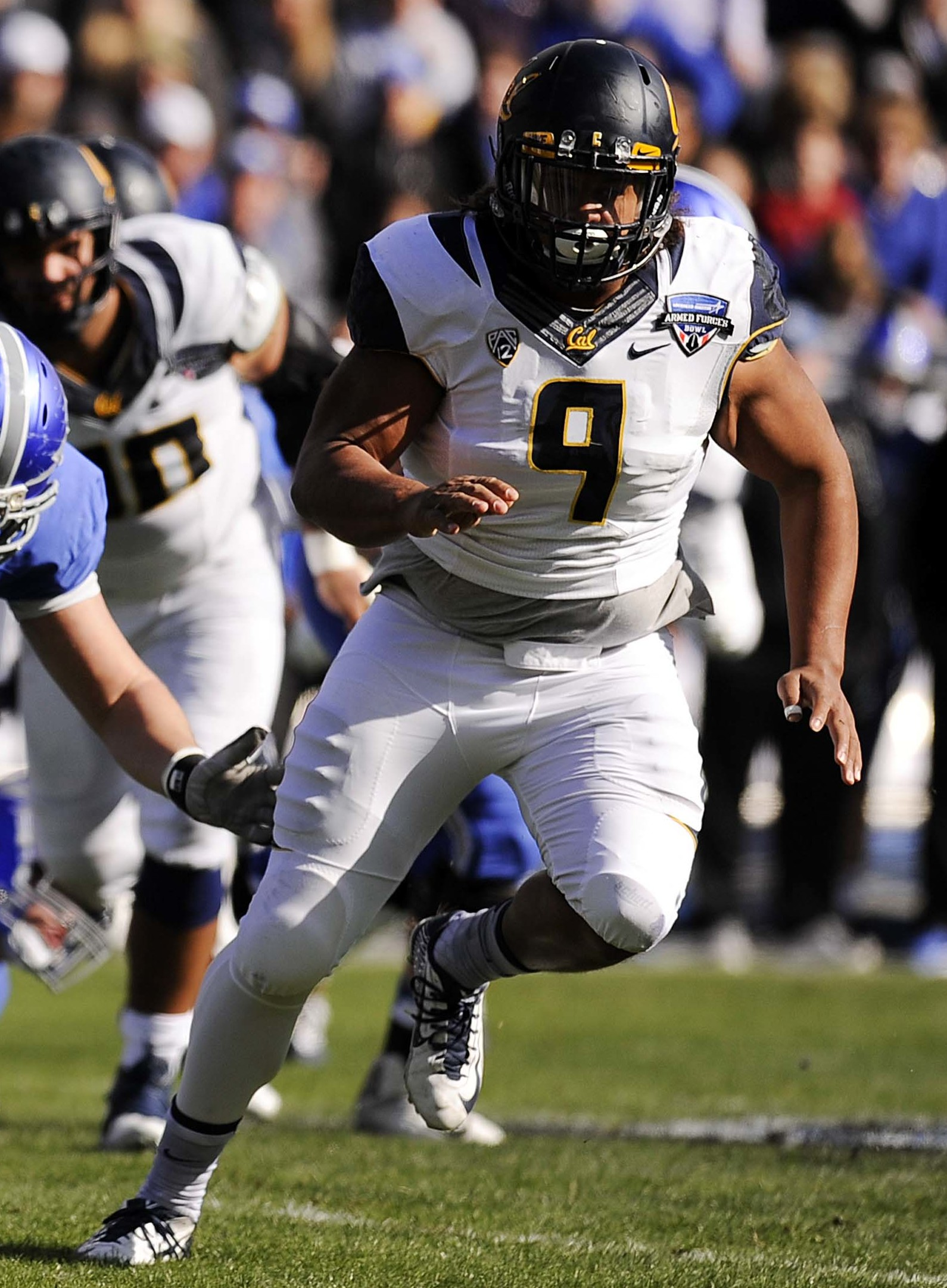
- Looney with Cal at the 2015 Armed Forces Bowl

No. 99
- Position: Defensive end

Personal information
- Born: May 15, 1995 (age 31); Lake Worth, Florida, U.S.
- Listed height: 6 ft 3 in (1.91 m)
- Listed weight: 287 lb (130 kg)

Career information
- High school: Lake Worth
- College: California
- NFL draft: 2018: 7th round, 232nd overall pick

Career history
- Green Bay Packers (2018–2019)
- Stats at Pro Football Reference

Kendall James Thomas Looney (born May 15, 1995) is an American former professional football player who was a defensive end in the National Football League (NFL). He played college football for the California Golden Bears.

== College career ==
Looney initially started his collegiate career as a defensive end at Wake Forest in 2013, appearing in six games. He transferred to the University of California, Berkeley, in 2014 and had to sit out a season per NCAA transfer rules. In 2015, he started in 11 games and appeared in 12 games for the Golden Bears. He recorded 35 tackles, 3.0 tackles for loss, one sacks, one pass breakup, and one fumble recovery. In 2016, he started all 12 games and recorded 54 tackles, one forced fumble, 3.5 sacks, eight tackles for loss (−38 yards), one fumble recovery, and two quarterback hurries. In his final collegiate season in 2017, he started all 12 games and recorded 41 tackles, 9.5 tackles for loss, 3.5 sacks, three quarterback hurries, one forced fumble, and two fumble recoveries.

== Professional career ==
Pre-draft measurables
Height	Weight	Arm length	Hand span	Wingspan	40-yard dash	10-yard split	20-yard split	20-yard shuttle	Three-cone drill	Vertical jump	Broad jump	Bench press
6 ft 2 3/4 in (1.90 m)	287 lb (130 kg)	32 in (0.81 m)	10 1/2 in (0.27 m)	6 ft 5 3/8 in (1.97 m)	4.89 s	1.67 s	2.84 s	4.37 s	7.32 s	35.5 in (0.90 m)	9 ft 5 in (2.87 m)	28 reps
All values from NFL Combine

Looney was selected by the Green Bay Packers in the seventh round (232nd overall) of the 2018 NFL draft. He signed his rookie contract on May 7, 2018. Looney was waived by Green Bay on September 1, and was re-signed to the practice squad the following day. He was promoted to the active roster on November 24.

On August 31, 2019, Looney was waived by the Packers and was re-signed to the team's practice squad the next day. On December 6, the Packers switched Looney over to tight end. He signed a reserve/future contract with the Packers on January 21, 2020. The Packers waived Looney on August 15.

== Personal life ==
Looney's older brother, Joe, is a former NFL offensive lineman who played at Wake Forest in college. Their father played college football at the University of Louisville. His younger brother, Keni-H Lovely, plays in the NFL for the Jacksonville Jaguars.
