= Stanley Shakespeare =

American football player (1963–2005)

No. 81
- Position: Wide receiver

Personal information
- Born: February 5, 1963; Auburn, New York, U.S.
- Died: April 26, 2005 (aged 42); Jupiter, Florida, U.S.
- Listed height: 6 ft 0 in (1.83 m)
- Listed weight: 190 lb (86 kg)

Career information
- High school: Lake Worth (Lake Worth Beach, Florida)
- College: Miami (FL) (1981–1984)
- NFL draft: 1985: undrafted

Career history
- Cleveland Browns (1985); Miami Dolphins (1987)*; Tampa Bay Buccaneers (1987)
- * Offseason or practice squad member only

Awards and highlights
- National champion (1983); Second-team All-South Independent (1984)
- Stats at Pro Football Reference

Stanley C. Shakespeare (February 5, 1963 – April 26, 2005) was an American professional football wide receiver who played for the Tampa Bay Buccaneers of the National Football League (NFL). He played college football at the University of Miami.

== Early life and college ==
Stanley C. Shakespeare was born on February 5, 1963, in Auburn, New York. He attended Lake Worth High School in Lake Worth Beach, Florida.

Shakespeare was a member of the Miami Hurricanes of the University of Miami from 1981 to 1984 and a two-year letterman from 1983 to 1984. In 1982, he recorded four receptions for 48 yards, three rushing attempts for 31 yards and one touchdown, and one kick return for 19 yards. He caught 34 passes for 452 yards and four touchdowns in 1983 as the Hurricanes were named consensus national champions. Shakespeare caught 38 passes for 621 yards and five touchdowns during the 1984 season, earning Associated Press second-team All-South Independent honors.

== Professional career ==
Shakespeare was a territorial selection of the Orlando Renegades of the United States Football League in 1985. He went undrafted in the 1985 NFL draft and signed with the Cleveland Browns on May 6, 1985. He was placed on injured reserve on August 20, 1985, and missed the entire season. Shakespeare was released by the Browns on August 12, 1986.

Shakespeare signed with the Miami Dolphins on May 4, 1987. He was released on September 7, 1987.

Shakespeare was signed by the Tampa Bay Buccaneers on October 14, 1987, during the 1987 NFL players strike. He played in the final strike game for the Buccaneers as a backup wide receiver and special teams player. He was released on October 19, 1987, after the strike ended.

== Personal life ==
Shakespeare drowned on April 26, 2005, after being knocked off his boat by a large wave.
