= School District of Palm Beach County =

School district in Florida, US

Location
- Palm Beach County Florida United States

District information
- Type: Public
- Grades: Pre K–12
- Established: 1909; 117 years ago
- Superintendent: Michael J. Burke
- Schools: 180 (2017)
- Budget: $5.9 billion (2025)

Students and staff
- Students: 192,533 (10th-largest in U.S.)
- Teachers: 12,800 (2017)
- Staff: 22,218 (2024)

Other information
- Teachers' unions: Florida Education Association
- Website: www.palmbeachschools.org

Location of Palm Beach County within Florida

The School District of Palm Beach County (SDPBC) is the tenth-largest public school district in the United States, and the fifth largest school district in Florida. The district encompasses all of Palm Beach County. For the beginning of the 2018–2019 academic year, enrollment totaled 192,533 students in Pre-K through 12th grades. The district operates a total of 180 schools: 109 elementary, 34 middle, 23 high, 14 alternative, adult and community, intermediate, and Exceptional Student Education (ESE). It has 27,168 employees and 45,000 volunteers.

Established in 1909, the district was known as the Palm Beach County Board of Public Instruction until the mid-1980s. It is accredited by Cognia (formerly known as Advance-ED). The district's headquarters are in the Fulton-Holland Educational Services Center in Palm Springs.

== Schools ==
As of 2010–2011, the district is responsible for the following schools:

- Wellington Community High School / Adult Center

=== Adult and community ===
- Adult Education Center
- Delray Full Service Center

=== Alternative ===
- AMIKids – Palm Beach
- CARP
- Crossroads Academy
- Elementary Transition – West at Crossroads Academy
- Elementary Transition North / Central – Gold Coast
- Gold Coast Community School
- Highridge Family Center
- Intensive Transition – South at South Area School of Choice
- Intensive Transition – West at Crossroads Academy
- Kelly Center
- PACE Center for Girls
- Riviera Beach Preparatory and Achievement Academy
- Turning Points Academy

=== Elementary ===
- Acreage Pines Elementary School
- Addison Mizner Elementary School, until closure in August 2021
- Allamanda Elementary School
- Banyan Creek Elementary School
- Barton Elementary School
- Belle Glade Elementary School
- Belvedere Elementary School
- Benoist Farms Elementary School
- Berkshire Elementary School
- Binks Forest Elementary School
- Blue Lake Elementary
- Boca Raton Elementary School
- Calusa Elementary School
- Cholee Lake Elementary School
- Citrus Cove Elementary School
- Clifford O. Taylor / Kirklane Elementary School
- The Conservatory School at North Palm Beach
- Coral Reef Elementary School
- Coral Sunset Elementary School
- Crosspointe Elementary School
- Crystal Lakes Elementary School
- Cypress Trails Elementary School
- Del Prado Elementary School
- Diamond View Elementary School
- Discovery Key Elementary School
- Dr. Mary McLeod Bethune Elementary School
- Egret Lake Elementary School
- Elbridge Gale Elementary School
- Equestrian Trails Elementary School
- Everglades Elementary School
- Forest Hill Elementary School
- Forest Park Elementary School
- Freedom Shores Elementary School
- Frontier Elementary School
- Galaxy E3 Elementary School
- Glade View Elementary School
- Golden Grove Elementary School
- Gove Elementary School
- Grassy Waters Elementary School
- Greenacres Elementary School
- Grove Park Elementary School
- H. L. Johnson Elementary School
- Hagen Road Elementary School
- Hammock Pointe Elementary School
- Heritage Elementary School
- Highland Elementary School
- Hope-Centennial Elementary School
- Indian Pines Elementary School
- J. C. Mitchell Elementary School
- Jerry Thomas Elementary School
- Jupiter Elementary School
- Jupiter Farms Elementary School
- K. E. Cunningham / Canal Point Elementary School
- Lake Park Elementary School
- Lantana Elementary School
- Liberty Park Elementary School
- Lighthouse Elementary School
- Limestone Creek Elementary School
- Loxahatchee Groves Elementary School
- Manatee Elementary School
- Marsh Pointe Elementary School
- Meadow Park Elementary School
- Melaleuca Elementary School
- Morikami Park Elementary School
- New Horizons Elementary School
- Northboro Elementary School
- Northmore Elementary School
- Orchard View Elementary School
- Pahokee Elementary School
- Palm Beach Gardens Elementary School
- Palm Beach Public
- Palm Springs Elementary School
- Palmetto Elementary School
- Panther Run Elementary School
- Pierce Hammock Elementary School
- Pine Grove Elementary School
- Pine Jog Elementary School
- Pioneer Park Elementary School
- Pleasant City Elementary School
- Plumosa School of the Arts
- Poinciana Elementary School
- Rolling Green Elementary School
- Roosevelt Elementary School
- Rosenwald Elementary School
- Royal Palm Beach Elementary School
- S. D. Spady Elementary School
- Saddle View Elementary School
- Sandpiper Shores Elementary School
- Seminole Trails Elementary School
- South Grade Elementary School
- South Olive Elementary School
- Starlight Cove Elementary School
- Sunrise Park Elementary School
- Sunset Palms Elementary School
- Timber Trace Elementary School
- U. B. Kinsey / Palmview Elementary School of the Arts
- Washington Elementary School
- Waters Edge Elementary School
- Wellington Elementary School
- West Gate Elementary School
- West Riviera Elementary School
- Westward Elementary School
- Whispering Pines Elementary School
- Wynnebrook Elementary School

=== ESE ===
- Indian Ridge School
- Royal Palm School

=== Middle ===
- Bak Middle School of the Arts
- Bear Lakes Middle School
- Boca Raton Community Middle School
- Carver Community Middle School
- Christa McAuliffe Middle School
- Congress Middle School
- Conniston Community Middle School
- Crestwood Middle School
- Don Estridge High Tech Middle School
- Eagles Landing Middle School
- Emerald Cove Middle School
- Howell L. Watkins Middle School
- Independence Middle School
- Jeaga Middle School
- John F. Kennedy Middle School
- Jupiter Middle School of Technology
- L. C. Swain Middle School
- Lake Shore Middle School
- Lake Worth Middle School
- Lantana Community Middle School
- Loggers Run Community Middle School
- Odyssey Middle School, until closure in 2017
- Okeeheelee Middle School
- Omni Middle School
- Osceola Creek Middle School
- Pahokee Middle School
- Palm Springs Community Middle School
- Polo Park Middle School
- Community Middle School
- Royal Palm School
- Somerset Academy Canyons Middle School
- Tradewinds Middle School
- Watson B. Duncan Middle School
- Wellington Landings Middle School
- West Boynton Middle
- Western Pines Middle School
- Woodlands Middle School

=== Intermediate ===
- Beacon Cove Intermediate School

=== K–12 ===
- Palm Beach Virtual School
- Village Academy on the Art & Sara Jo Kobacker Campus

=== K–8 ===
- Dwight D. Eisenhower K-8
- Hidden Oaks K-8
- North Grade K-8
- Verde K-8
- Addison Mizner K-8 (as of August 2021)

=== High ===
- Alexander W. Dreyfoos Jr. School of the Arts
- Atlantic Community High School
- Boca Raton Community High School
- Boynton Beach Community High School
- Dr. Joaquín García High School
- Forest Hill Community High School
- G-Star School Of The Arts
- Glades Central Community High School
- John I. Leonard Community High School
- Jupiter Community High School
- Lake Worth Community High School
- Olympic Heights Community High School
- Pahokee High School
- Palm Beach Central High School
- Palm Beach Gardens Community High School
- Palm Beach Lakes Community High School
- Park Vista Community High School
- Royal Palm Beach Community High School
- Santaluces Community High School
- Seminole Ridge Community High School
- Somerset Academy Canyons High School
- Spanish River Community High School
- Suncoast Community High School
- Wellington Community High School
- West Boca Raton Community High School
- William T. Dwyer High School

=== Defunct racially segregated schools ===
Racially segregated schools included:

- Boca Raton Negro High School, renamed Roadman School in 1956
- Colored School No. 4
- Everglades Camp, grades 1–6, 1955–1966
- East Lake High School (Pahokee)
- Everglades Vocational High School (Belle Glade), renamed Lake Shore High School (Belle Glade) in 1955
- George Washington Carver High School (Delray Beach, Florida)
- Industrial High School (West Palm Beach, Florida), renamed Roosevelt Junior-Senior High School in 1950, then Roosevelt High School
- Lincoln High School (Riviera Beach, Florida), in building formerly housing West Riviera Junior High School
- Osborne School (Lake Worth, Florida)

=== Future schools ===
- New High School in Riviera Beach (opening by August 2030)
- Western Communities High School (opening in August 2028)
- Westlake Area Elementary School (opening date TBA)
- North County Elementary School (opening in August 2030)
- West Delray Area K-8 (opening in August 2030)

== District leadership ==
Michael J. Burke was named interim superintendent of the Palm Beach County School District in July 2021, and was selected for a full term in October 2021. The district is governed by a school board of seven members, all elected from single-member districts. One board member is elected chair, and one is elected vice chair. Board members serve staggered terms, and members from Districts 1, 2, and 5 are elected during presidential election years, while the members from Districts 3, 4, 6, and 7 are elected in gubernatorial election years. Board members are Karen Brill (Chair District 3), Matthew Jay Lane esq. (District 1), Virginia Savietto (District 2), Erica Whitfield (District 4), Gloria Branch (District 5), Marcia Andrews (District 6), and Edwin Ferguson esq. (District 7).

== Demographics ==
As of the 2019–2020 school year, in its enrollment breakdown by ethnic group, 35.9% of its students were of Hispanic origin, of any race; 29.6% of students were of non-Hispanic white ancestry; 27.7% of students were African-American; 3.0% of students were Asian-American; 2.8% of students were of multiple race categories; and Native Americans and Pacific Islanders composed less than 1% of the student population.

Regarding economic status, 58.4% of students were considered economically disadvantaged.

== Performance ==
As of the 2018–2019 school year, SDPBC has a graduation rate of 87.1%, up from 82.3% from the 2015–2016 school year. During the 2019 spring examination of the statewide Florida Standards Assessments, 54% of third grade students achieved basic proficiency or higher in English language arts.

== Controversy ==
Prior to 2021, the board had taken "major steps to improve equity among students", though "glaring disparities" in suspension rates, student performance, and attendance between black and white students remained. In part because of these disparities, on May 5, 2021, the school board adopted an equity statement which said it is "committed to dismantling structures rooted in white advantage". The board later voted to remove the controversial statement because it had angered so many people.
