= Dave Heffernan (American football) =

American football player (born 1962)

No. 66
- Position: Guard

Personal information
- Born: October 28, 1962 (age 64); Boston, Massachusetts, U.S.
- Listed height: 6 ft 4 in (1.93 m)
- Listed weight: 255 lb (116 kg)

Career information
- High school: Christopher Columbus (Miami, Florida)
- College: Miami (FL) (1981–1984)
- NFL draft: 1985: 7th round, 183rd overall pick

Career history
- Kansas City Chiefs (1985)*; Detroit Lions (1986)*; New York Jets (1987)*; Tampa Bay Buccaneers (1987)
- * Offseason or practice squad member only

Awards and highlights
- National champion (1983); First-team All-South Independent (1984); Second-team All-South Independent (1983)

Career NFL statistics
- Games played: 2
- Stats at Pro Football Reference

David Roy Heffernan (born October 28, 1962) is an American former professional football player who was a guard for the Tampa Bay Buccaneers of the National Football League (NFL). He played college football for the Miami Hurricanes.

== Early life ==
Heffernan was born on October 28, 1962, in Boston, Massachusetts. He attended Christopher Columbus High School in Miami, Florida.

== College career ==
Heffernan played college football for the Miami Hurricanes from 1981 to 1984 and was a two-year letterman from 1983 to 1984. He played primarily at tackle but also filled in at center due to injury. Heffernan earned second-team and first-team All-South Independent honors in 1983 and 1984, respectively.

== Professional career ==
=== Kansas City Chiefs ===
Heffernan was selected in the tenth round, with the 253rd overall selection, by the Kansas City Chiefs in the 1985 NFL draft. On July 15, he signed his rookie contract with the team. On August 19, Heffernan was waived.

=== Detroit Lions ===
In 1986, Heffernan was signed by the Detroit Lions. On August 26, he was waived by the team.

=== New York Jets ===
On March 26, 1987, Heffernan signed with the New York Jets. On August 31, he was released.

=== Tampa Bay Buccaneers ===
On September 26, 1987, Heffernan was signed by the Tampa Bay Buccaneers. He played in two strike games for the team before he was placed on the injured reserve on October 19. On November 17, Heffernan was released.
