= Joe Looney (offensive lineman) =

American football player (born 1990)

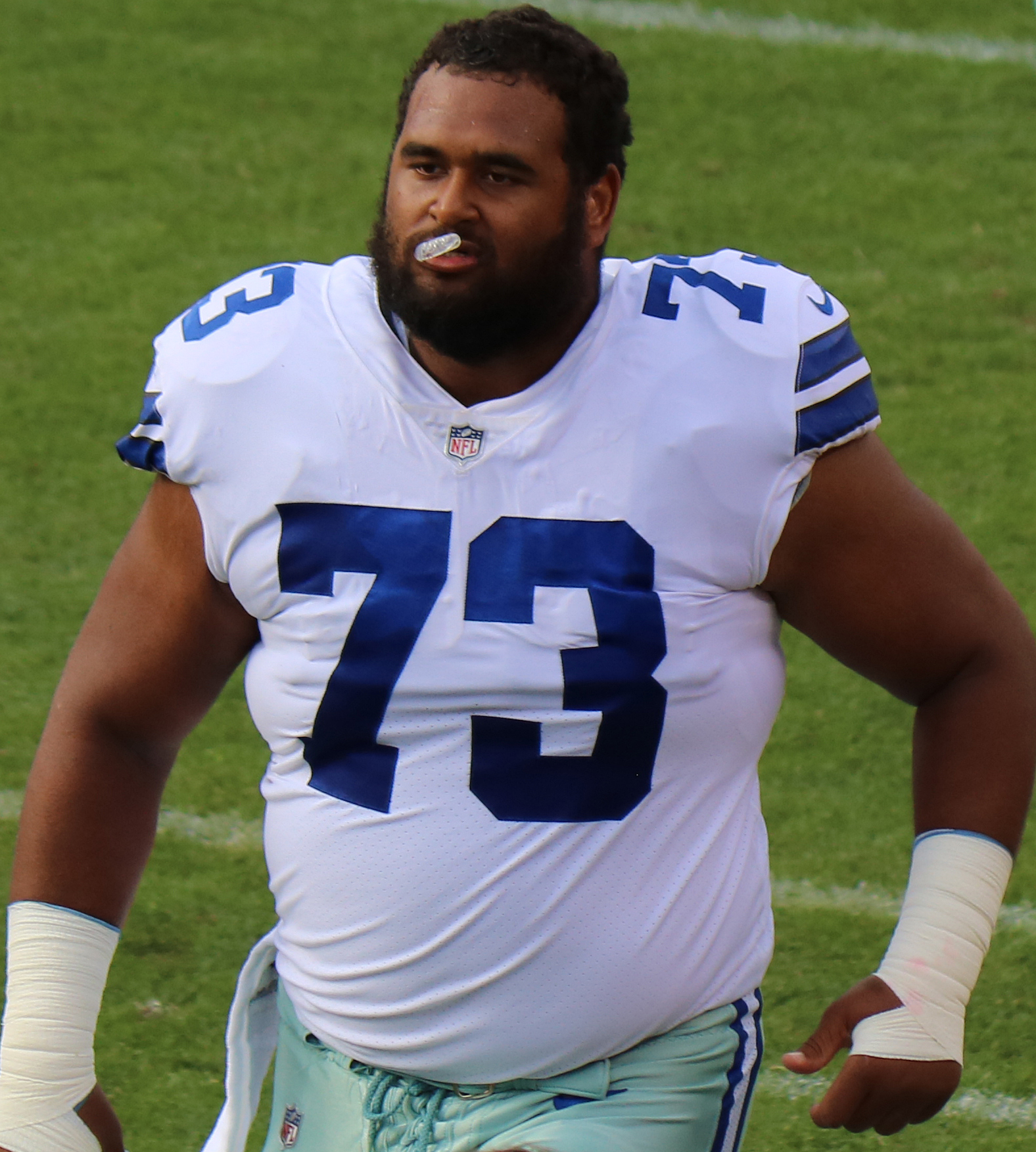
- Looney with the Dallas Cowboys in 2017

No. 78, 73, 77
- Position: Center

Personal information
- Born: August 31, 1990 (age 36); Lake Worth Beach, Florida, U.S.
- Listed height: 6 ft 3 in (1.91 m)
- Listed weight: 310 lb (141 kg)

Career information
- High school: Lake Worth
- College: Wake Forest
- NFL draft: 2012: 4th round, 117th overall pick

Career history
- San Francisco 49ers (2012–2014); Tennessee Titans (2015); Dallas Cowboys (2016–2020); New York Giants (2021)*
- * Offseason or practice squad member only

Awards and highlights
- Second-team All-ACC (2011)

Career NFL statistics
- Games played: 103
- Games started: 41
- Stats at Pro Football Reference

Joseph Donald Looney (born August 31, 1990) is an American former professional football player who was a center in the National Football League (NFL). He played college football for the Wake Forest Demon Deacons and was selected by the San Francisco 49ers in the fourth round of the 2012 NFL draft.

== Early life ==
Looney was raised in Lake Worth, Florida. At the age of six, he already weighed 120 pounds, so he had to play football with boys who were as much as twice his age.

He attended Lake Worth Community High School, where he was a four-year starter at offensive tackle. He was named second-team all-state as a junior. He received All-Palm Beach County and All-state Class 6A honors as a senior in 2008.

== College career ==
Looney accepted a football scholarship from Wake Forest University. As a true freshman, he became a starter at left guard in the seventh game against the University of Miami, after Trey Bailey broke his ankle against the University of Maryland and Russell Nenon was moved from left guard to center.

As a sophomore, he started 11 out of 12 games at left guard. The next year he started 10 games at left guard, missing two contests while recovering from a sprained ankle.

As a senior, he started all 13 games at left guard. He finished his college career with 41 starts out of 48 games over four years. He received a late invitation to play in the Senior Bowl, but he suffered a foot injury during practice, and was unable to participate in the NFL Combine or Wake Forest's pro day.

== Professional career ==
Pre-draft measurables
Height	Weight	Arm length	Hand span	Wingspan	Bench press
6 ft 3 1/4 in (1.91 m)	309 lb (140 kg)	32 1/4 in (0.82 m)	9 3/4 in (0.25 m)	6 ft 5 in (1.96 m)	26 reps
All values from NFL Combine

=== San Francisco 49ers ===
Looney was selected by the San Francisco 49ers in the fourth round (117th overall) of the 2012 NFL draft, after trading a sixth round pick (#196-Jonte Green) to the Detroit Lions in order to move up eight slots. As a rookie, he spent the entire season on the inactive list.

In 2013, he appeared in four games as a backup and was inactive for 12 contests and all three playoff games.

In 2014, he appeared in 15 games with four starts, including two starts at right guard, one at center and one at left guard, helping the offense finish fourth in the NFL in rushing with 2,176 yards. He was released on September 4, 2015.

=== Tennessee Titans ===
On October 20, 2015, Looney was signed by the Tennessee Titans for depth purposes, after center Brian Schwenke was placed on the injured reserve list. He appeared in eight games with six starts (three at center and three at left guard). He dressed but did not play in three games.

=== Dallas Cowboys ===
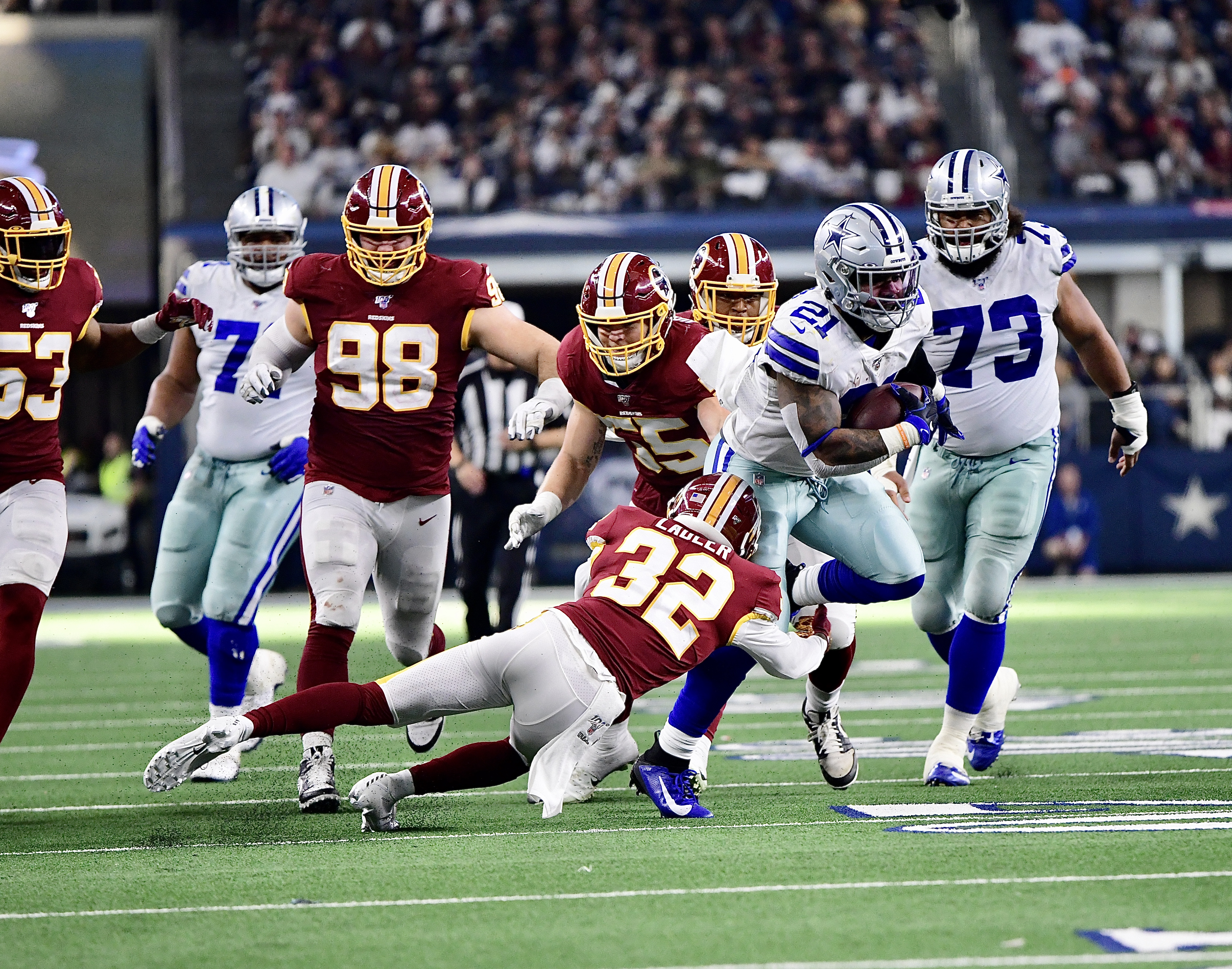
Looney in a game against the Washington Redskins

On March 29, 2016, the Dallas Cowboys signed Looney as a free agent to a two-year contract, to replace the recently departed Mackenzy Bernadeau, as a versatile backup that could play any of the interior positions along the offensive line. He replaced an injured Ronald Leary at left guard in the fourth quarter against the Cleveland Browns. After Geoff Swaim was injured against the Pittsburgh Steelers, he began to be used as a blocking tight end in short yardage situations. He helped rookie running back Ezekiel Elliott become the rushing NFL leader and was one of the offensive linemen that Elliott gave an ATV as a gift at the end of the season.

In 2017, he appeared in all 16 games as a backup. He earned the name "Jumbo Joe" while, despite being a backup, he appeared frequently in jumbo packages featuring an extra lineman.

On March 26, 2018, Looney re-signed with the Cowboys on a two-year contract. In 2018, Looney was named the starting center for all 16 games after Travis Frederick was diagnosed with Guillain–Barré syndrome and missed the entire season.

In 2019, Looney returned to a reserve role after Frederick regained his health and his starting job. He appeared in 16 games with one start at center in the season finale against the Washington Redskins.

On March 19, 2020, Looney re-signed with the Cowboys. He was named the starting center following the retirement of Frederick. Looney suffered a sprained MCL in Week 4 and was placed on injured reserve on October 10. He was activated on October 31. Looney appeared in 13 games (starting 12) at center and was replaced with rookie Tyler Biadasz while he was out. He was not re-signed after the season.

=== New York Giants ===
On July 31, 2021, Looney signed with the New York Giants. He announced his retirement from the NFL on August 4.

== Personal life ==
Looney's younger brother, James, was a player at Lake Worth Community High School and also decided to attend Wake Forest before transferring to the University of California. He was a member of the Green Bay Packers from 2018 to 2020. Their father played college football at the University of Louisville. His younger brother, Keni-H Lovely, plays in the NFL for the Jacksonville Jaguars.

Looney is a high school teacher in Little Elm, Texas.
