= Atlantic Community High School =

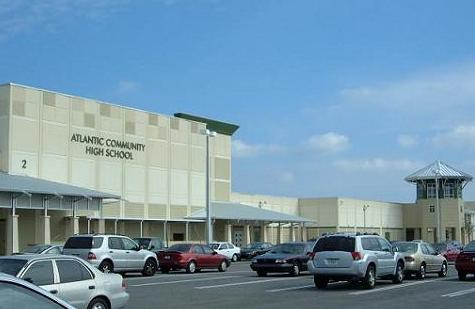

Location
- 2455 West Atlantic Avenue; Delray Beach, Florida 33445; United States; 26°27′32″N 80°05′56″W

Information
- Type: Public and Magnet secondary school
- Established: 1949
- School district: Palm Beach County School District
- CEEB code: 100420
- Principal: Sandra Edwards
- Teaching staff: 107.00 (FTE)
- Grades: 9–12
- Enrollment: 1,829 (2023-2024)
- Student to teacher ratio: 17.09
- Campus: Suburban
- Colors: Green and white
- Nickname: Eagles
- Rival: Boca Raton Community High School
- Newspaper: The Squall
- Yearbook: Nautilus
- Website: ahs.palmbeachschools.org

Atlantic Community High School (also known as Atlantic and ATL and formerly called Seacrest High School) is a public high school located in Delray Beach, Florida, United States. It is part of the School District of Palm Beach County. Known for its academics, many students attend due to the school's International Baccalaureate program. In 2005, the school moved to its current location and added a freshman academy and a construction-oriented magnet program.

== History ==
Atlantic Community High School, originally named Seacrest High School, was built in 1949 as a racially segregated school for white students in Delray Beach and Boynton Beach, Florida. African-American students living in the area attended Carver High School, which later became Carver Middle School and is now the Delray Beach Full Service Center. The school began the process of desegregation in 1961 when Yvonne Lee entered the school, one of only four African-American students attending otherwise all white schools in Palm Beach County that year. Seacrest remained almost all white, and Carver remained all African-American, until 1970, when Carver High School was closed and its student body merged with that of Seacrest, which was renamed Atlantic High School. The school adopted the colors of Seacrest High School (Green and White) and the mascot of Carver High School (the eagle). It kept Seacrest High's old location along Seacrest Boulevard. In 1989, the school became an International Baccalaureate World School. In 2005, the school moved to its current location on Atlantic Avenue. In 2011, Kathleen Weigel was promoted from principal of the school to the new district position of Assistant Superintendent of Professional Growth. Weigel, who was principal for more than 10 years was replaced by Bear Lakes Middle School principal Anthony Lockhart.

== Student demographics ==
There were 1829 students enrolled in Atlantic Community High School in the 2023–2024 school year. Fifty-three percent of the students were female. The student body was 67% African-American, 14% Hispanic, 12% white, 4% Asian-American, 2% multiracial, and less than 1% each Native American and Native Hawaiian/Pacific Islander.

== Academics and magnet programs ==
=== School ratings ===
The school was rated annually by the Florida Comprehensive Assessment Test until the assessment was replaced in 2019. School ratings were then calculated by the Florida Standards Assessment (FSA) through 2023, and currently by the Florida Assessment of Student Thinking (FAST).

Due to the COVID-19 pandemic grades were not assessed in 2020, and only assessed if the school opted in for 2021.

Year	School Grade
1999	C
2000	C
2001	C
2002	C
2003	B
2004	B
2005	B
2006	B
2007	C
2008	C
2009	B
2010	B
2011	A
2012	A
2013	A
2014	A
2015	A
2016	B
2017	B
2018	B
2019	C
2020	N/A
2021	N/A
2022	B
2023	C
2024	B

=== International Baccalaureate ===
Atlantic is home to one of the six International Baccalaureate (also known as IB) high school programs of Palm Beach County (the others being Royal Palm Beach High School, Forest Hill Community High School, Pahokee High School, Suncoast High School, and William T. Dwyer High School) and caters to students living in the southern parts of the district.

=== Construction Academy ===
Atlantic's construction academy was added to the school beginning in fall 2005. The students of the academy designed and built a house called the "Eagle's Nest" (after the school mascot) for charity in collaboration with the city of Delray Beach. The groundbreaking ceremony for the project kick-off was held in December 2005. It is a three bedroom, two bath house, 1,500 square feet (140 m^{2}).

On October 25, 2010, the Construction Academy broke ground on a new house called "Eagle's Nest 2". The house is to be a "green" house and the design incorporates aspects of a green building, using green construction material design principles. It too is being done in collaboration with the city of Delray Beach.

== Extracurricular activities ==
=== Athletics ===
Atlantic participates in the 8A athletic division of the FHSAA. The school fields teams in 43 sports including football, basketball, baseball, swimming, soccer, softball, tennis, golf, bowling, wrestling, volleyball, cross country, track and field, weightlifting, and flag football among others. The Atlantic Boys' Baseball Team won the 13-7A District Championship against Dwyer on April 24, 2014. The Atlantic Boys' soccer team made it into the 4A state final four in the 2013–14 season. In 2015, Atlantic added a lacrosse team, both Boys and Girls. They ended up playing their inaugural season that year. In the 2015–16 season, the undefeated Eagles football team won the 10-8A District Championship against the undefeated Boca Raton Bobcats on October 30, 2015, in a rivalry matchup, and in 2017 they competed in the state championships.

=== JROTC ===
Atlantic is home to the Eagle Battalion of the Army Junior Reserve Officer Training Corps.

=== Clubs ===
Atlantic supports a wide variety of clubs, including Mu Alpha Theta, Academic Games, ACE, French National Honors Society, Black Student Union, Literary Club, Art Club, International Culture Club, Science Club/Science Olympiad, People for Animal Welfare (PAW), Jewish Forum, Muslim Student Association, Asian Culture Club, Latinos in Action, Model UN, We the People, Queer Student Union (QSU), Robotics Club, Drama Club, Key Club, and chapters of the National Honor Society, Spanish National Honor Society and Rho Kappa Social Studies Honor Society.

== Notable alumni ==
- Bobby Butler, cornerback - after playing at Florida State went on to play for the Atlanta Falcons throughout the eighties and early nineties.
- David Clowney, wide receiver, played one year for the Carolina Panthers and four years for the New York Jets.
- Jake Eder, MLB Pitcher, Los Angeles Angels
- Brandon Flowers, defensive back played for the San Diego Chargers and the Kansas City Chiefs of the National Football League.
- Orlando Franklin, former right tackle for the San Diego Chargers, started career with the Denver Broncos.
- Mandy Freeman, professional soccer player for NY/NJ Gotfham FC and 10th pick overall at the 2017 NWSL College Draft
- Jayron Hosley, cornerback, played four years with the New York Giants.
- Omar Jacobs, fifth-round draft pick of the Pittsburgh Steelers in the 2006 NFL draft, and former quarterback for the Berlin Thunder in NFL Europe.
- Ricardo Jordan, former MLB player (Toronto Blue Jays, Philadelphia Phillies, New York Mets, Cincinnati Reds)
- Keni-H Lovely, cornerback for the Jacksonville Jaguars
- Preston Parker, former wide receiver for the Tampa Bay Buccaneers and the New York Giants
- Rick Rhoden, former MLB player (Los Angeles Dodgers, Pittsburgh Pirates, New York Yankees, Houston Astros)
- Mike Rumph, former cornerback for the St. Louis Rams of the NFL. Currently the cornerbacks coach for the Miami Hurricanes football team
