= Tom Costello (American football) =

American football player (born 1941)

No. 83, 54
- Position: Linebacker

Personal information
- Born: May 23, 1941; Queens, New York, U.S.
- Listed height: 6 ft 4 in (1.93 m)
- Listed weight: 220 lb (100 kg)

Career information
- High school: Holy Cross (Flushing, NY)
- College: Dayton / Miami (FL)
- NFL draft: 1964: undrafted

Career history
- New York Giants (1964–1965); Brooklyn Dodgers (COFL) (1966)

Career NFL statistics
- Games played: 10
- Fumble recoveries: 1
- Stats at Pro Football Reference

Thomas Francis Costello (May 23, 1941) is an American former professional football linebacker who played for the New York Giants of the National Football League (NFL). He played in the 1964 NFL season and the 1965 NFL season.

== Career statistics ==
=== Regular season ===
| Year | Team | Games | | Sacks | Interceptions | | | Fumbles | | | |
| Year | Team | GP | GS | Sacks | Int | Yds | TD | FF | FR | Yds | TD |
|---|---|---|---|---|---|---|---|---|---|---|---|
| 1964 | NYG | 2 | 0 | — | 0 | 0 | 0 | — | 0 | 0 | 0 |
| 1965 | NYG | 8 | 0 | — | 0 | 0 | 0 | — | 1 | 0 | 0 |
| Career | | 10 | 0 | — | 0 | 0 | 0 | — | 1 | 0 | 0 |
