= Darrell Fullington =

American football player (born 1964)

No. 29, 27
- Position: Safety

Personal information
- Born: April 17, 1964 (age 62); New Smyrna Beach, Florida, U.S.
- Listed height: 6 ft 1 in (1.85 m)
- Listed weight: 197 lb (89 kg)

Career information
- High school: New Smyrna Beach
- College: Miami (FL)
- NFL draft: 1988: 5th round, 124th overall pick

Career history
- Minnesota Vikings (1988–1990); New England Patriots (1991); Tampa Bay Buccaneers (1991–1992); Kansas City Chiefs (1994)*
- * Offseason or practice squad member only

Awards and highlights
- National champion (1987); Second Team-team All-South Independent (1984)

Career NFL statistics
- Interceptions: 10
- Fumble recoveries: 2
- Sacks: 1
- Stats at Pro Football Reference

Darrell L. Fullington (born April 17, 1964) is an American former professional football player who was a safety in the National Football League (NFL). He played college football for the Miami Hurricanes.

Fullington was selected in the fifth round (124th overall) out of the University of Miami to the Minnesota Vikings in the 1988 NFL draft. Fullington was also with the New England Patriots, waived by them in September 1991 and eventually claimed by the Tampa Bay Buccaneers. He started for most of the 1992 season, having been primarily a nickel back and special teamer under Bucs coach Richard Williamson.
