= Kevin Fagan (American football) =

American football player and coach (born 1963)

No. 75
- Position: Defensive end

Personal information
- Born: April 25, 1963 (age 63); Lake Worth, Florida, U.S.
- Listed height: 6 ft 3 in (1.91 m)
- Listed weight: 260 lb (118 kg)

Career information
- High school: John I. Leonard (Greenacres, Florida)
- College: Miami (FL)
- NFL draft: 1986: 4th round, 102nd overall pick

Career history

Playing
- San Francisco 49ers (1987–1993)

Coaching
- Dunnellon High School →(football & softball coach); Radford University →(head coach, softball); College of Central Florida →(head coach, softball); Emmanuel College (Georgia) →(head coach, softball)

Awards and highlights
- 2× Super Bowl champion (XXIII, XXIV); National champion (1983); Second-team All-South Independent (1983); First Team All-South Independent (1984)

Career NFL statistics
- Sacks: 25.5
- Fumble recoveries: 3
- Stats at Pro Football Reference

Kevin Scott Fagan (born April 25, 1963) is an American former professional football player who was a defensive end for seven seasons for the San Francisco 49ers of the National Football League (NFL) from 1987 to 1993. Fagan was regarded as one of the best run stopping defensive linemen in professional football, until several injuries including back, shoulder, and knee issues forced him to retire following the 1993 season. In 1990, Fagan earned second-team UPI all-pro honors.

Although he was drafted in the fourth round of the 1986 NFL Draft, he didn't make his official debut until 1987 for San Francisco.

Fagan was one of the NFL's strongest men, having recorded a Miami school record 560 pound bench press.

Fagan graduated in 1981 from John I. Leonard High School in Lake Worth, where he played football and track and field. He played college football at the University of Miami and is a member of the UM Sports Hall of Fame.

Fagan has previously served as a football coach for Dunnellon High School in Dunnellon, Florida, and also coached softball there.

From 2014 through 2020, Fagan was the head softball coach of the College of Central Florida.

On August 28, 2020, Fagan was named the new head softball coach at Emmanuel College in Georgia.

== Personal life ==
Fagan's daughters Kasey, Sami, and Haley played collegiate Division I softball, and both Sami and Haley went on to play professionally. He also has another daughter, Cameron, and two sons, Cole and Jack.
