= Preston Parker =

American football player (born 1987)

No. 87, 83, 15
- Positions: Wide receiver, return specialist

Personal information
- Born: February 13, 1987 (age 39); Delray Beach, Florida, U.S.
- Listed height: 6 ft 0 in (1.83 m)
- Listed weight: 200 lb (91 kg)

Career information
- High school: Atlantic Community (Delray Beach)
- College: Florida State; North Alabama
- NFL draft: 2010: undrafted

Career history
- Tampa Bay Buccaneers (2010−2012); New Orleans Saints (2013)*; New York Giants (2014–2015)
- * Offseason or practice squad member only

Career NFL statistics
- Receptions: 85
- Receiving yards: 1,057
- Receiving touchdowns: 5
- Stats at Pro Football Reference

Preston Parker (born February 13, 1987) is an American former professional football player who was a wide receiver and return specialist in the National Football League (NFL). He was signed by the Tampa Bay Buccaneers as an undrafted free agent in 2010. He played college football for the Florida State Seminoles and North Alabama Lions.

== Early life ==
Parker graduated from Atlantic Community High School in 2006. PrepStar Magazine awarded him All-American honors following his senior season. After catching 45 passes for 1,150 yards with 11 touchdowns as a senior, The Florida Sports Writers Association selected Parker to the All-State first team in Class 5A. Rivals.com ranked him as the No. 12 wide receiver and gave him four stars. In 2006, on the Preseason Florida Top 100, Rivals also listed him as the second ranked wide receiver as well as the number 18th ranked overall player in the state of Florida. He finished his varsity career with 90 receptions for 1,960 yards, 30 touchdowns and, as a defensive back, received Class 5A all-state second team honors. He chose Florida State over Miami, Minnesota, and NC State.

== College career ==
=== Freshman season ===
In 2006, as a true freshman for the Seminoles, Parker played in 10 games. He received playing time in the Seminoles' Emerald Bowl victory over UCLA. He caught two passes for 26 yards and rushed for 13 yards on three attempts. He also returned one kickoff for 21 yards. During the 2006 season, he and one other player were the only two true freshmen wide receivers to record a reception.

=== Sophomore season ===
Parker played in every game that season for the Seminoles, including the Music City Bowl against Kentucky. As a wide receiver he started in three games (Miami, Virginia Tech and Kentucky) and then two games at running back (Maryland, Florida). Rivals.com and Phil Steele awarded him All-ACC second team honors as a wide receiver. As a punt returner, he was an All-ACC third team selection by Steele. Parker led the team in all purpose yards (1,513) and catches. He was second on the team in receiving yards, rushing attempts as well as rushing yards and was the team's leading punt returner. Out of anyone with more than five carries, he had the highest average yards per rush. With 9.82 yards per play, he placed ninth among all freshmen and sophomores in the Football Bowl Subdivision and was third in the FBS amongst sophomores in average yards per play. At the conclusion of the season, he was nationally ranked 75th in all-purpose yards, 30th in punt returns and also 91st in receptions per game. He finished the season in the top 10 in the ACC for receptions per game (fifth), punt return average (third), all-purpose yards (seventh) and receiving yards per game (eighth).

Parker was the first player to ever play for Bobby Bowden to garner 80 yards rushing, receiving and returning kicks in a single game in the same season. He acquired averages of 116 yards of total offense per game, 61 yards per game and 13 yards per catch as a wide receiver. He accounted for 51 first downs (team high) and tied for the team lead with five touchdowns. Against Maryland, he garnered 133 yards on 20 carries (career high) when he was forced into a starting rotation at running back due to injuries sustained by all three of the Seminoles' running backs. Parker had only five days to learn the new position and still had the second most productive rushing performance of the season by any Florida State running back. In 10 of the 12 games he played at as wide receiver he had at least four catches. He went on to finish the season tied for 10th all-time in single season receptions at FSU. He was the Seminoles' 2007 MVP.

=== Junior season ===
Parker opened the season with a two-game suspension due to legal issues. He played in 10 games and made eight starts. Even though he missed two games versus Western Carolina and UTC, Parker led all of the wide receivers with 40 catches and was also second on the team with 372 yards. In the last seven regular season games of the 2008 season he caught 34 passes which were twice as many as any other wide receiver on the team. In four of the last seven regular season games he had 50 yards or more receiving and averaged almost five catches per game after the win at NC State. In a win over Clemson, he recorded 169 all-purpose yards and 127 all-purpose yards in a loss at Georgia Tech.

== Legal troubles ==
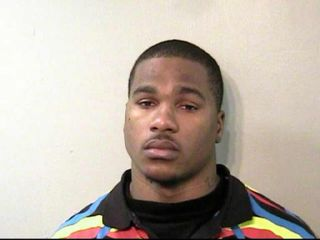
Parker's mugshot after DUI arrest

Throughout his career at Florida State, Parker gathered numerous charges. In November 2006, he was arrested after Tallahassee police said he tried to steal a DVD. He entered a diversionary program and the charge was later dismissed. In April 2008, he was arrested and charged with carrying a concealed firearm (felony) and possession of marijuana (misdemeanor).

In January 2009, Parker was arrested for DUI after police found him passed out behind the wheel of his car. His blood alcohol content was 0.054, which is well below the Florida legal limit of 0.08. Police said a urine sample was a "presumptive positive" for marijuana. Police also stated that Parker admitted to drinking alcohol and smoking marijuana the night before. With this being his third arrest, he was dismissed from the team. He finished his collegiate career at the University of North Alabama.

== Professional career ==
=== Tampa Bay Buccaneers ===
After the 2010 collegiate season, Parker signed with the Tampa Bay Buccaneers.

He made the team after performing well during the preseason. He garnered very little playing time and caught four passes in 9 games played. In his second year with the team, he gained 554 yards and scored 3 touchdowns. In 2012, he signed an exclusive rights deal, worth $540K for 1 year. On Thursday, September 20, 2012, he was released by the Tampa Bay Buccaneers with the signing of Tiquan Underwood.

=== New Orleans Saints ===
On January 3, 2013, the New Orleans Saints signed Parker to a futures contract. Although he performed well in training camp as both wide receiver and kick returner (including two touchdown catches in a preseason game against Kansas City), Parker was released on August 31, 2013, as part of the team's final preseason cuts.

=== New York Giants ===
New York Giants signed Preston on January 7, 2014. Parker had 36 catches for 418 yards and two touchdowns on the year. He also contributed to special teams as a returner. He was released by the Giants on September 22, 2015, after a series of crucial dropped passes in multiple games.
