= Orange Bowl =

Annual American college football postseason game

- Capital One Orange Bowl
- Stadium: Hard Rock Stadium
- Location: Miami Gardens, Florida (December 1996–1998, 2000–present) (Note: The facility now known as Hard Rock Stadium is located in Miami Gardens. However, the city was not incorporated until 2003. Prior to that, the area was an unincorporated area of Miami-Dade County, and the stadium used a Miami address.)
- Previous stadiums: Miami Field (1935–1937); Miami Orange Bowl (1938–January 1996, 1999)
- Previous locations: Miami, Florida (1935–January 1996, 1999)
- Operated: 1935–present
- Championship affiliation: CFP (2014–present); BCS (1998–2013); Bowl Alliance (1995–1997); Bowl Coalition (1992–1994)
- Previous conference tie-ins: Big Eight (1954–1996); ACC (1999–2026); Big East (1999–2006); SEC/Big Ten/Notre Dame (December 2014–December 2023)
- Payout: US$35 million/conference (As of 2009)
- Website: orangebowl.org

Sponsors
- Federal Express/FedEx (1989–2010); Discover Financial (2011–January 2014); Capital One (December 2014–present)

Former names
- Orange Bowl (1935–1988); Federal Express/FedEx Orange Bowl (1989–2010); Discover Orange Bowl (2011–January 2014)

2026 matchup
- Texas Tech vs. Oregon (Oregon 23–0)

The Orange Bowl is an annual American college football bowl game played in the Miami metropolitan area. Played annually since January 1, 1935, it is tied with the Sugar Bowl and the Sun Bowl as the second-oldest bowl games in the country, surpassed only by the Rose Bowl Game.

The Orange Bowl was originally held in the city of Miami at Miami Field before moving to the Miami Orange Bowl stadium in 1938. In 1996, it moved to its current location at Hard Rock Stadium in Miami Gardens. Since December 2014, the game has been sponsored by Capital One and officially known as the Capital One Orange Bowl. Previous sponsors include Discover Financial (2011–January 2014) and Federal Express/FedEx (1989–2010).

In its early years, the Orange Bowl had no defined conference tie-ins; it often pitted a team from the southeastern part of the country against a team from the central or northeastern states. From the 1950s until the mid-1990s, the Orange Bowl had a strong relationship with the Big Eight Conference. The champion (or runner-up in years in which the "no-repeat" rule was invoked) was invited to the bowl game in most years during this time; the 1979 Orange Bowl even had two representatives from the Big Eight. Opponents of the Big Eight varied; but were often major independents, runners-up in the Southeastern Conference (SEC), or champions of the Atlantic Coast Conference (ACC). Between 2007 and 2023, the Orange Bowl has hosted the ACC champion—unless they are involved in the national championship or playoff, in which case another high-ranking ACC team takes their place.

Beginning in 1992, the Orange Bowl joined with several other bowls to create the Bowl Coalition in an effort to produce an undisputed national champion in college football. It subsequently was part of the Bowl Alliance and Bowl Championship Series. From 1992 to 2006, the Orange Bowl served as the national championship game of these systems in 1994, 1995, 1998, 2001, and 2005. Miami Gardens and the Orange Bowl Committee hosted the BCS National Championship Game in 2009 and 2013 in addition to the regular Orange Bowl game.

In 2014, the Orange Bowl, along with the "New Year's Six" bowls, became a part of the College Football Playoff. As part of the four team playoff from 2014 to 2023, the Orange Bowl served as a semifinal game in 2015, 2018, and 2021. When not serving as a semifinal, the Orange Bowl featured the best available team from the ACC versus the second best team from the Big Ten or SEC or Notre Dame.

With the expansion of the College Football Playoff to twelve teams in the 2024–25 season, the Orange Bowl will serve as either a quarterfinal or semifinal each year. It served as a semifinal in 2025 and will serve as a quarterfinal in 2026. When serving as a quarterfinal, the Orange Bowl hosted the ACC champion, if seeded in the top four. When serving as a semifinal, the game will be played one week after New Year's Day and, if the ACC champion was one of the top two seeds, the team would have been assigned to the Orange Bowl. Beginning with the 2027 edition, the Orange Bowl no longer has a conference tie-in.

== History ==
=== Early roots ===
In 1890, Pasadena, California, held its first Tournament of Roses Parade to showcase the city's mild weather compared to the harsh winters in northern cities. As one of the organizers said: "In New York, people are buried in snow. Here, our flowers are blooming and our oranges are about to bear. Let's hold a festival to tell the world about our paradise." In 1902, the annual festival was enhanced by adding an American football game.

In 1926, leaders in Miami, Florida, decided to do the same with a "Fiesta of the American Tropics" that was centered around a New Year's Day football game. Although a second "Fiesta" was never held, Miami leaders, including Earnest E. Seiler, later revived the idea with the "Palm Festival" (with the slogan "Have a Green Christmas in Miami").

=== Palm Festival Game ===
In 1932, George E. Hussey, official greeter of Miami, organized the first Festival of Palms Bowl, a predecessor of the Orange Bowl. With Miami suffering from both the Great Depression and the preceding Florida land bust, Hussey and other Miamians sought to help its economy by organizing a game similar to Pasadena's Rose Bowl.

Two games were played in this series at Moore Park in Miami, both pitting an invited opponent against a local team, the University of Miami. In the first game, played on January 2, 1933, Miami defeated Manhattan College 7–0. In the second game, played on New Year's Day 1934, Duquesne defeated Miami 33–7. Duquesne was coached by Elmer Layden, one of the Four Horsemen of Notre Dame.

These games are not recognized as bowl games by the NCAA because one team was guaranteed a berth regardless of record. However, following the success of these games, backers organized another game for New Year's Day 1935 under the Orange Bowl name. This game, unlike the Palm Festival Games, did not automatically grant a berth to one team, although the University of Miami was again a participant. For this reason, the 1935 Orange Bowl was later recognized by the NCAA as an official bowl game.

=== Modern game ===
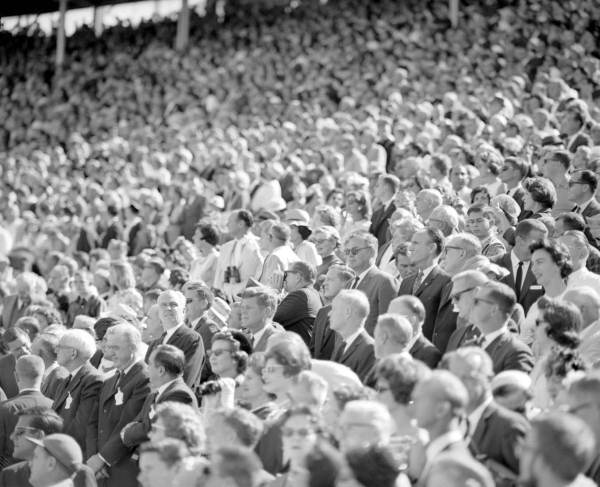
President John F. Kennedy (lower center) at the 1963 Orange Bowl, January 1, 1963

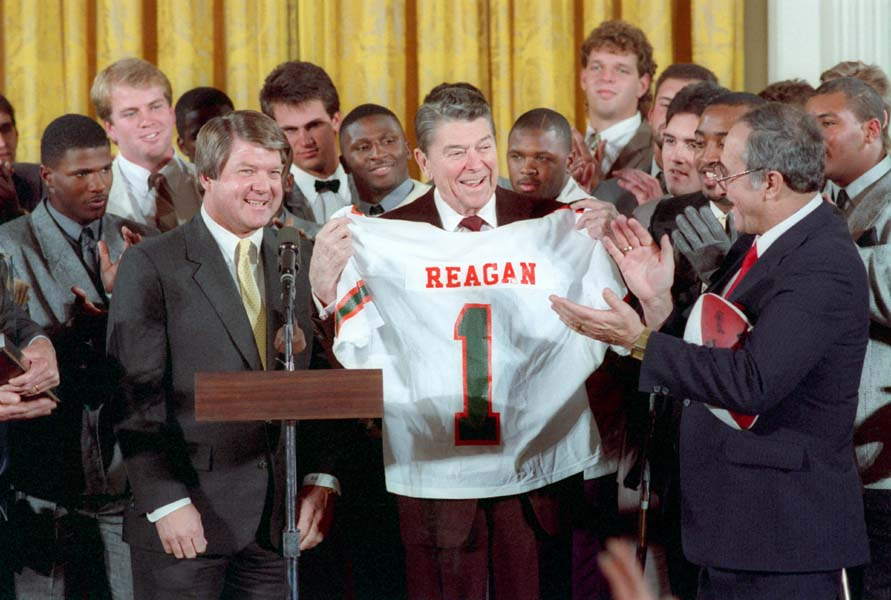
Jimmy Johnson and the 1987 Miami Hurricanes football team won the 1988 Orange Bowl on January 1, 1988, giving the University of Miami its second national championship in the 1987 season. Later that month, Johnson and the Miami Hurricanes football team presented President Ronald Reagan with a University of Miami jersey at The White House

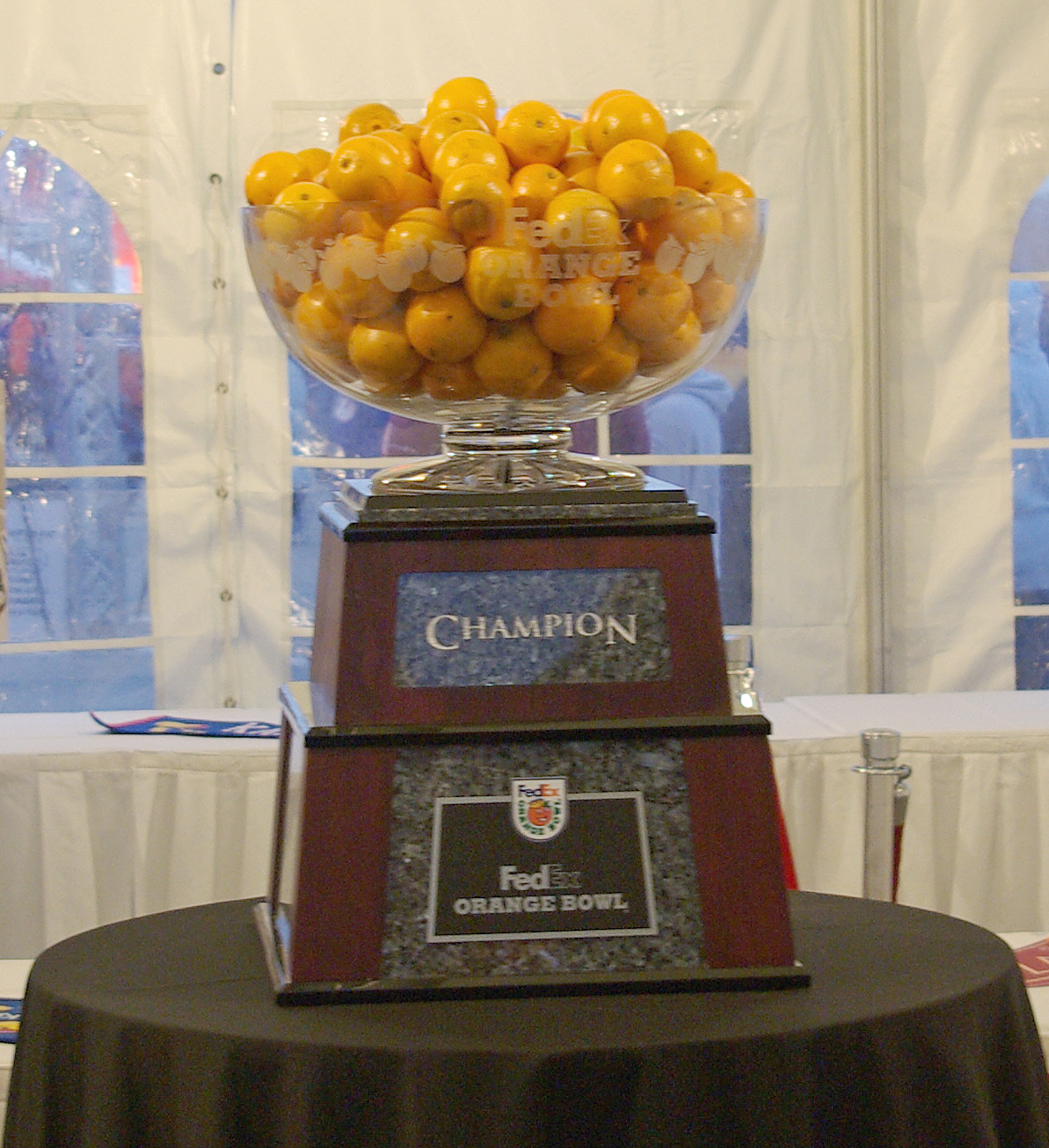
The Orange Bowl trophy, 2008

The Orange Bowl was played at Miami Field (located where Miami Orange Bowl was later built) from 1935 to 1937, the Miami Orange Bowl from 1938 to 1996, and again in 1999, and was moved to its current site, Hard Rock Stadium in Miami Gardens, Florida, in December 1996. The game was played back at the namesake stadium in 1999 (which would be the final bowl game ever in the Miami Orange Bowl) because the game was played on the same day the Miami Dolphins hosted an NFL Wild Card Playoff game. Coincidentally, both of those games were aired on ABC.

On January 1, 1965, the Texas vs. Alabama Orange Bowl was the first college bowl game to be televised live in prime time.

From 1954 onwards, the game usually featured the champion of the former Big Eight Conference. When the Big Eight Conference merged with four members of the defunct Southwest Conference in 1996, the newly formed Big 12 Conference moved its conference champion tie-in to the Fiesta Bowl. From 1998 to 2013, however, with the creation of the Bowl Championship Series system, team selection for the Orange Bowl was tied into the other three BCS Bowls and (from 2006 to 2013) the BCS National Championship Game.

From 1998 to 2005, the game hosted the champion of either the ACC or Big East conferences, unless they were invited to the National Championship game, or if the Orange Bowl itself was hosting the national championship matchup.

Starting with the 2006 season, the Orange Bowl has been exclusively tied with the ACC and has used the brand Home of the ACC Champion. As one of the Bowl Championship Series (BCS) bowl games, the site of the Orange Bowl also hosted the national championship game one week after the Orange Bowl game; it did so on a four-year rotating basis with the other three BCS games (the others being the Sugar, Fiesta, and Rose Bowls). The tie-in with the ACC continued with the inception of the College Football Playoff after the 2014 season. However, following the expansion to a 12-team playoff format, the Orange Bowl's official relationship with the ACC ended as all New Year's Six bowls became permanent playoff fixtures.

=== King Orange Jamboree Parade ===
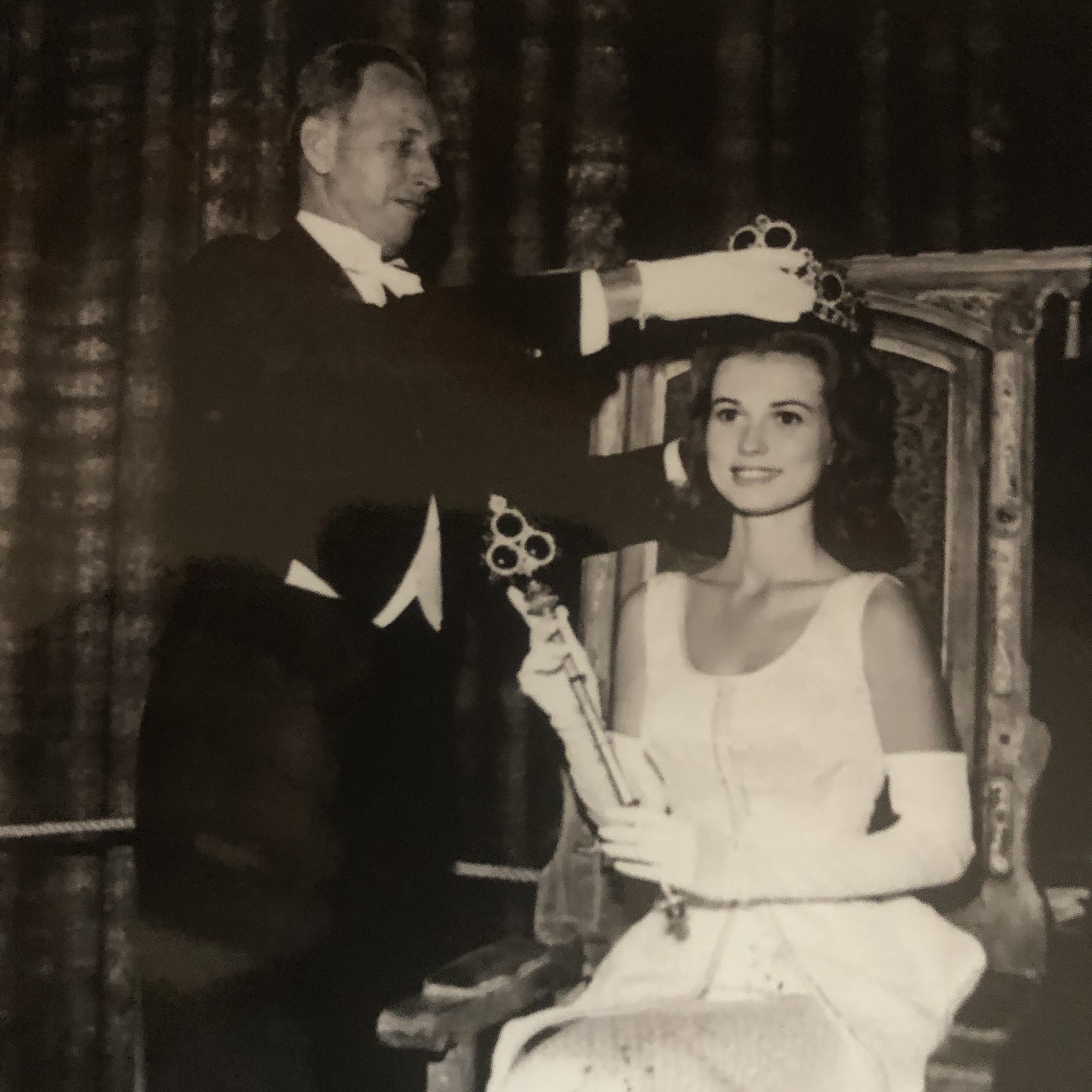
Helen Grossman Crowned Orange Bowl Queen 1966

From 1936 to 2001 (except for the World War II years), the Orange Bowl Committee also sponsored a parade. The very first King Orange Jamboree Parade was held the day before the 1936 game with 30 floats at an expense of $40,000 ($928,058 in 2025). An Orange Bowl Queen and court of Princesses was selected from young women who were residents of Florida. A coronation ball was held the beginning of the month of December before the game, and the queen and princesses would ride on a float during the parade on New Years Day and preside over the half-time show at the game. Babs Beckwith was chosen as the first Orange Bowl queen. Past Orange Bowl Queens include Victoria Principal and Jackie Nespral. In its heyday, the parade was a nighttime New Year's Eve tradition, televised nationally with lighted floats and displays going down part of Biscayne Boulevard in downtown Miami to crowds as high as 500,000 people in the 1970s. However ratings dropped and the national television contract was lost in 1997, causing the parade to quickly become a shell of its former self since there were no sponsors for the elaborate floats. Attendance dwindled as well; by the turn of the millennium, the parade was lucky to draw 20,000 people. As a result, the committee chose to bring this tradition to an end in early 2002.

== Conference tie-ins ==
During the three seasons of the Bowl Coalition from 1992 to 1994, the Orange Bowl invited the champion of the Big Eight Conference unless the champion was selected for the Bowl Coalition championship game and was the lower-ranked team. The Orange Bowl hosted the Big Eight champion all three seasons, and hosted the championship game for the 1993 and 1994 seasons.

From the 1998 to 2023 seasons, the Orange Bowl had an agreement with the Atlantic Coast Conference (ACC) to receive its champion, or, from 2014 onward, its best available team if the ACC champion qualified for the playoff. When not serving as the BCS National Championship Game game, the Orange Bowl hosted the ACC champion eleven times, and did not host the ACC champion in the 1998, 1999, and 2013 seasons.

With the advent of the College Football Playoff, the Orange Bowl hosted the semifinals every three seasons. In other seasons, the Orange Bowl selected the highest-ranked team from the Big Ten Conference, Southeastern Conference (SEC), or the University of Notre Dame to play against the highest-ranked available ACC team. During the twelve-year period of the initial CFP contract, the Big Ten and SEC were guaranteed three appearances each, while Notre Dame could appear in a maximum of two games but was not guaranteed any appearances. The selection of the Big Ten/SEC/Notre Dame team was subject to several constraints:

- The Big Ten and SEC champions were always excluded due to tie-ins with the Rose Bowl and Sugar Bowl and, when those bowls served as semifinal games, requirements that the champions appear in the Cotton Bowl Classic, Fiesta Bowl, or Peach Bowl if they did not qualify for the playoffs.
- If the Big Ten champion qualified for the playoff when the Rose Bowl was not serving as a semifinal, the next-highest ranked team available from the conference was obligated to appear in the Rose Bowl.
- If the SEC champion qualified for the playoff when the Sugar Bowl was not serving as a semifinal, the next-highest ranked team available from the conference was obligated to appear in the Sugar Bowl.
- If the highest-ranked team available from the Big Ten, SEC, and Notre Dame created a rematch with the ACC team, the Orange Bowl had the option of passing over that team for the next-highest ranked team among the Big Ten, SEC, and Notre Dame, again subject to the other constraints. Rankings are based on the College Football Playoff committee's rankings.

During the four-team CFP era, the ACC champion appeared twice in the Orange Bowl when it was not a semifinal, in 2022 and 2023. For the other five Orange Bowls not serving as a semifinal, the second-best ACC team appeared four times and the third-best ACC team appeared once (2020). To face the ACC representative in non-semifinal editions, the Orange Bowl selected the second-best Big Ten team once, the second-best SEC team three times, the third-best Big Ten team once, and the third-best SEC team twice. The Big Ten made two appearances, the SEC made five appearances, and Notre Dame made zero appearances in non-semifinal Orange Bowls during the four-team CFP era. The Orange Bowl never exercised its option to pass over the highest-ranked available team from the Big Ten, SEC, and Notre Dame.

When the Orange Bowl served as a semifinal, the ACC was guaranteed a spot in the Cotton Bowl Classic, Fiesta Bowl, or Peach Bowl for its champion, or if the champion qualified for the playoff, its highest-ranked available team. Under these provisions, the ACC representative appeared in the Peach Bowl in 2015, 2018, and 2021.

== Game results ==
All rankings are taken from the AP poll (inaugurated in 1936), before each game was played.

| Date played | Winning team | | Losing team | | Venue | Attendance | Notes |
|---|---|---|---|---|---|---|---|
| January 1, 1935 | Bucknell | 26 | Miami (Florida) | 0 | Miami Field | 5,134 | notes |
| January 1, 1936 | Catholic | 20 | Ole Miss | 19 | Miami Field | 6,568 | notes |
| January 1, 1937 | #14 Duquesne | 13 | Mississippi State | 12 | Miami Field | 9,210 | notes |
| January 1, 1938 | Auburn | 6 | Michigan State | 0 | Miami Orange Bowl | 18,972 | notes |
| January 2, 1939 | #2 Tennessee | 17 | #4 Oklahoma | 0 | Miami Orange Bowl | 32,191 | notes |
| January 1, 1940 | #16 Georgia Tech | 21 | #6 Missouri | 7 | Miami Orange Bowl | 29,278 | notes |
| January 1, 1941 | #9 Mississippi State | 14 | #13 Georgetown | 7 | Miami Orange Bowl | 29,554 | notes |
| January 1, 1942 | #14 Georgia | 40 | TCU | 26 | Miami Orange Bowl | 35,786 | notes |
| January 1, 1943 | #10 Alabama | 37 | #8 Boston College | 21 | Miami Orange Bowl | 25,166 | notes |
| January 1, 1944 | LSU | 19 | Texas A&M | 14 | Miami Orange Bowl | 25,203 | notes |
| January 1, 1945 | Tulsa | 26 | #13 Georgia Tech | 12 | Miami Orange Bowl | 23,279 | notes |
| January 1, 1946 | Miami (Florida) | 13 | #16 Holy Cross | 6 | Miami Orange Bowl | 35,709 | notes |
| January 1, 1947 | #10 Rice | 8 | #7 Tennessee | 0 | Miami Orange Bowl | 36,152 | notes |
| January 1, 1948 | #10 Georgia Tech | 20 | #12 Kansas | 14 | Miami Orange Bowl | 59,578 | notes |
| January 1, 1949 | Texas | 41 | #8 Georgia | 28 | Miami Orange Bowl | 60,523 | notes |
| January 2, 1950 | #15 Santa Clara | 21 | #11 Kentucky | 13 | Miami Orange Bowl | 64,816 | notes |
| January 1, 1951 | #10 Clemson | 15 | #15 Miami (Florida) | 14 | Miami Orange Bowl | 65,181 | notes |
| January 1, 1952 | #6 Georgia Tech | 17 | #9 Baylor | 14 | Miami Orange Bowl | 65,839 | notes |
| January 1, 1953 | #9 Alabama | 61 | #14 Syracuse | 6 | Miami Orange Bowl | 66,280 | notes |
| January 1, 1954 | #4 Oklahoma | 7 | #1 Maryland | 0 | Miami Orange Bowl | 68,640 | notes |
| January 1, 1955 | #14 Duke | 34 | Nebraska | 7 | Miami Orange Bowl | 68,750 | notes |
| January 2, 1956 | #1 Oklahoma | 20 | #3 Maryland | 6 | Miami Orange Bowl | 76,561 | notes |
| January 1, 1957 | #20 Colorado | 27 | #19 Clemson | 21 | Miami Orange Bowl | 72,552 | notes |
| January 1, 1958 | #4 Oklahoma | 48 | #16 Duke | 21 | Miami Orange Bowl | 76,318 | notes |
| January 1, 1959 | #5 Oklahoma | 21 | #9 Syracuse | 6 | Miami Orange Bowl | 75,281 | notes |
| January 1, 1960 | #5 Georgia | 14 | #18 Missouri | 0 | Miami Orange Bowl | 75,280 | notes |
| January 2, 1961 | #5 Missouri | 21 | #4 Navy | 14 | Miami Orange Bowl | 72,212 | notes |
| January 1, 1962 | #4 LSU | 25 | #7 Colorado | 7 | Miami Orange Bowl | 62,391 | notes |
| January 1, 1963 | #5 Alabama | 17 | #8 Oklahoma | 0 | Miami Orange Bowl | 72,880 | notes |
| January 1, 1964 | #6 Nebraska | 13 | #5 Auburn | 7 | Miami Orange Bowl | 72,647 | notes |
| January 1, 1965 | #5 Texas | 21 | #1 Alabama | 17 | Miami Orange Bowl | 72,647 | notes |
| January 1, 1966 | #4 Alabama | 39 | #3 Nebraska | 28 | Miami Orange Bowl | 72,214 | notes |
| January 2, 1967 | Florida | 27 | #8 Georgia Tech | 12 | Miami Orange Bowl | 72,426 | notes |
| January 1, 1968 | #3 Oklahoma | 26 | #2 Tennessee | 24 | Miami Orange Bowl | 77,993 | notes |
| January 1, 1969 | #3 Penn State | 15 | #6 Kansas | 14 | Miami Orange Bowl | 77,719 | notes |
| January 1, 1970 | #2 Penn State | 10 | #6 Missouri | 3 | Miami Orange Bowl | 77,282 | notes |
| January 1, 1971 | #3 Nebraska | 17 | #5 LSU | 12 | Miami Orange Bowl | 80,699 | notes |
| January 1, 1972 | #1 Nebraska | 38 | #2 Alabama | 6 | Miami Orange Bowl | 78,151 | notes |
| January 1, 1973 | #9 Nebraska | 40 | #12 Notre Dame | 6 | Miami Orange Bowl | 80,010 | notes |
| January 1, 1974 | #6 Penn State | 16 | #13 LSU | 9 | Miami Orange Bowl | 60,477 | notes |
| January 1, 1975 | #9 Notre Dame | 13 | #2 Alabama | 11 | Miami Orange Bowl | 71,801 | notes |
| January 1, 1976 | #3 Oklahoma | 14 | #5 Michigan | 6 | Miami Orange Bowl | 76,799 | notes |
| January 1, 1977 | #11 Ohio State | 27 | #12 Colorado | 10 | Miami Orange Bowl | 65,537 | notes |
| January 2, 1978 | #6 Arkansas | 31 | #2 Oklahoma | 6 | Miami Orange Bowl | 60,987 | notes |
| January 1, 1979 | #4 Oklahoma | 31 | #6 Nebraska | 24 | Miami Orange Bowl | 66,365 | notes |
| January 1, 1980 | #5 Oklahoma | 24 | #4 Florida State | 7 | Miami Orange Bowl | 66,714 | notes |
| January 1, 1981 | #4 Oklahoma | 18 | #2 Florida State | 17 | Miami Orange Bowl | 71,043 | notes |
| January 1, 1982 | #1 Clemson | 22 | #4 Nebraska | 15 | Miami Orange Bowl | 72,748 | notes |
| January 1, 1983 | #3 Nebraska | 21 | #13 LSU | 20 | Miami Orange Bowl | 68,713 | notes |
| January 2, 1984 | #5 Miami (Florida) | 31 | #1 Nebraska | 30 | Miami Orange Bowl | 72,549 | notes |
| January 1, 1985 | #4 Washington | 28 | #2 Oklahoma | 17 | Miami Orange Bowl | 56,294 | notes |
| January 1, 1986 | #3 Oklahoma | 25 | #1 Penn State | 10 | Miami Orange Bowl | 74,178 | notes |
| January 1, 1987 | #3 Oklahoma | 42 | #9 Arkansas | 8 | Miami Orange Bowl | 52,717 | notes |
| January 1, 1988 | #2 Miami (Florida) | 20 | #1 Oklahoma | 14 | Miami Orange Bowl | 74,760 | notes |
| January 2, 1989 | #2 Miami (Florida) | 23 | #6 Nebraska | 3 | Miami Orange Bowl | 79,480 | notes |
| January 1, 1990 | #4 Notre Dame | 21 | #1 Colorado | 6 | Miami Orange Bowl | 81,190 | notes |
| January 1, 1991 | #1 Colorado | 10 | #5 Notre Dame | 9 | Miami Orange Bowl | 77,062 | notes |
| January 1, 1992 | #1 Miami (Florida) | 22 | #11 Nebraska | 0 | Miami Orange Bowl | 77,747 | notes |
| January 1, 1993 | #3 Florida State | 27 | #11 Nebraska | 14 | Miami Orange Bowl | 57,324 | notes |
| January 1, 1994^{BC} | #1 Florida State | 18 | #2 Nebraska | 16 | Miami Orange Bowl | 81,536 | notes |
| January 1, 1995^{BC} | #1 Nebraska | 24 | #3 Miami (Florida) | 17 | Miami Orange Bowl | 81,753 | notes |
| January 1, 1996 | #6 Florida State | 31 | #8 Notre Dame | 26 | Miami Orange Bowl | 72,198 | notes |
| December 31, 1996 | #6 Nebraska | 41 | #10 Virginia Tech | 21 | Pro Player Stadium‡ | 63,297 | notes |
| January 2, 1998^{BA} | #2 Nebraska | 42 | #3 Tennessee | 17 | Pro Player Stadium‡ | 74,002 | notes |
| January 2, 1999 | #7 Florida | 31 | #18 Syracuse | 10 | Miami Orange Bowl† | 67,919 | notes |
| January 1, 2000 | #8 Michigan | 35 | #5 Alabama | 34 | Pro Player Stadium‡ | 70,461 | notes |
| January 3, 2001^{BCS} | #1 Oklahoma | 13 | #3 Florida State | 2 | Pro Player Stadium‡ | 76,835 | notes |
| January 2, 2002 | #5 Florida | 56 | #6 Maryland | 23 | Pro Player Stadium‡ | 73,640 | notes |
| January 2, 2003 | #5 USC | 38 | #3 Iowa | 17 | Pro Player Stadium‡ | 75,971 | notes |
| January 1, 2004 | #10 Miami (Florida) | 16 | #9 Florida State | 14 | Pro Player Stadium‡ | 76,739 | notes |
| January 4, 2005^{BCS} | #1 USC†† | 55 | #2 Oklahoma | 19 | Pro Player Stadium‡ | 77,912 | notes |
| January 3, 2006 | #3 Penn State | 26 | #22 Florida State | 23 | Dolphins Stadium‡ | 77,773 | notes |
| January 2, 2007 | #5 Louisville | 24 | #15 Wake Forest | 13 | Dolphin Stadium‡ | 74,470 | notes |
| January 3, 2008 | #8 Kansas | 24 | #5 Virginia Tech | 21 | Dolphin Stadium‡ | 74,111 | notes |
| January 1, 2009 | #21 Virginia Tech | 20 | #12 Cincinnati | 7 | Dolphin Stadium‡ | 73,602 | notes |
| January 5, 2010 | #10 Iowa | 24 | #9 Georgia Tech | 14 | Land Shark Stadium‡ | 66,131 | notes |
| January 3, 2011 | #5 Stanford | 40 | #12 Virginia Tech | 12 | Sun Life Stadium‡ | 65,453 | notes |
| January 4, 2012 | #17 West Virginia | 70 | #22 Clemson | 33 | Sun Life Stadium‡ | 67,563 | notes |
| January 1, 2013 | #13 Florida State | 31 | #16 Northern Illinois | 10 | Sun Life Stadium‡ | 72,073 | notes |
| January 3, 2014 | #12 Clemson | 40 | #7 Ohio State | 35 | Sun Life Stadium‡ | 72,080 | notes |
| December 31, 2014 | #10 Georgia Tech | 49 | #8 Mississippi State | 34 | Sun Life Stadium‡ | 58,211 | notes |
| December 31, 2015^{SF} | #1 Clemson | 37 | #4 Oklahoma | 17 | Sun Life Stadium‡ | 67,615 | notes |
| December 30, 2016 | #10 Florida State | 33 | #6 Michigan | 32 | Hard Rock Stadium | 67,432 | notes |
| December 30, 2017 | #6 Wisconsin | 34 | #11 Miami (Florida) | 24 | Hard Rock Stadium | 65,326 | notes |
| December 29, 2018^{SF} | #1 Alabama | 45 | #4 Oklahoma | 34 | Hard Rock Stadium | 66,203 | notes |
| December 30, 2019 | #6 Florida | 36 | #23 Virginia | 28 | Hard Rock Stadium | 65,157 | notes |
| January 2, 2021 | #5 Texas A&M | 41 | #14 North Carolina | 27 | Hard Rock Stadium | 13,737 | notes |
| December 31, 2021^{SF} | #3 Georgia | 34 | #2 Michigan | 11 | Hard Rock Stadium | 66,839 | notes |
| December 30, 2022 | #6 Tennessee | 31 | #10 Clemson | 14 | Hard Rock Stadium | 63,912 | notes |
| December 30, 2023 | #6 Georgia | 63 | #4 Florida State | 3 | Hard Rock Stadium | 63,324 | notes |
| January 9, 2025^{SF} | #3 Notre Dame | 27 | #5 Penn State | 24 | Hard Rock Stadium | 66,881 | notes |
| January 1, 2026^{QF} | #5 Oregon | 23 | #4 Texas Tech | 0 | Hard Rock Stadium | 65,021 | notes |

^BC Denotes Bowl Coalition Championship Game
^BA Denotes Bowl Alliance Championship Game
^BCS Denotes BCS National Championship Game
^QF Denotes College Football Playoff quarterfinal game
^SF Denotes College Football Playoff semifinal game
‡ Denotes a historical name for what is now Hard Rock Stadium
† Due to an NFL scheduling conflict, the 1999 game was played at the Miami Orange Bowl
†† USC vacated their 2005 victory due to NCAA sanctions

== MVPs ==
The bowl first named an MVP in 1965. From 1970 through 1998, two MVPs were named for each game. Since 1999, only a single MVP is named, except when the game is part of the College Football Playoff, in which case both an offensive and defensive MVP are named.

| Year played | MVP | Team | Position |
|---|---|---|---|
| 1965 | Joe Namath | Alabama | QB |
| 1966 | Steve Sloan | Alabama | QB |
| 1967 | Larry Smith | Florida | TB |
| 1968 | Bob Warmack | Oklahoma | QB |
| 1969 | Donnie Shanklin | Kansas | HB |
| 1970 | Chuck Burkhart | Penn State | QB |
| 1970 | Mike Reid | Penn State | DT |
| 1971 | Jerry Tagge | Nebraska | QB |
| 1971 | Willie Harper | Nebraska | DE |
| 1972 | Jerry Tagge | Nebraska | QB |
| 1972 | Rich Glover | Nebraska | DG |
| 1973 | Johnny Rodgers | Nebraska | WB |
| 1973 | Rich Glover | Nebraska | DG |
| 1974 | Tom Shuman | Penn State | QB |
| 1974 | Randy Crowder | Penn State | DT |
| 1975 | Wayne Bullock | Notre Dame | FB |
| 1975 | Leroy Cook | Alabama | DE |
| 1976 | Steve Davis | Oklahoma | QB |
| 1976 | Lee Roy Selmon | Oklahoma | DT |
| 1977 | Rod Gerald | Ohio State | QB |
| 1977 | Tom Cousineau | Ohio State | LB |
| 1978 | Roland Sales | Arkansas | RB |
| 1978 | Reggie Freeman | Arkansas | NG |
| 1979 | Billy Sims | Oklahoma | RB |
| 1979 | Reggie Kinlaw | Oklahoma | NG |
| 1980 | J. C. Watts | Oklahoma | QB |
| 1980 | Bud Hebert | Oklahoma | FS |
| 1981 | J. C. Watts | Oklahoma | QB |
| 1981 | Jarvis Coursey | Florida State | DE |
| 1982 | Homer Jordan | Clemson | QB |
| 1982 | Jeff Davis | Clemson | LB |
| 1983 | Turner Gill | Nebraska | QB |
| 1983 | Dave Rimington | Nebraska | C |
| 1984 | Bernie Kosar | Miami (Fla.) | QB |
| 1984 | Jack Fernandez | Miami (Fla.) | LB |
| 1985 | Jacque Robinson | Washington | TB |
| 1985 | Ron Holmes | Washington | DT |
| 1986 | Sonny Brown | Oklahoma | DB |
| 1986 | Tim Lashar | Oklahoma | K |
| 1987 | Spencer Tillman | Oklahoma | HB |
| 1987 | Dante Jones | Oklahoma | LB |
| 1988 | Bernard Clark | Miami (Fla.) | LB |
| 1988 | Darrell Reed | Oklahoma | DE |
| 1989 | Steve Walsh | Miami (Fla.) | QB |
| 1989 | Charles Fryer | Nebraska | CB |
| 1990 | Raghib Ismail | Notre Dame | WR |
| 1990 | Darian Hagan | Colorado | QB |
| 1991 | Charles Johnson | Colorado | QB |
| 1991 | Chris Zorich | Notre Dame | NG |

| Year played | MVP | Team | Position |
|---|---|---|---|
| 1992 | Larry Jones | Miami (Fla.) | RB |
| 1992 | Tyrone Legette | Nebraska | CB |
| 1993 | Charlie Ward | Florida State | QB |
| 1993 | Corey Dixon | Nebraska | SE |
| 1994 | Charlie Ward | Florida State | QB |
| 1994 | Tommie Frazier | Nebraska | QB |
| 1995 | Tommie Frazier | Nebraska | QB |
| 1995 | Chris T. Jones | Miami (Fla.) | WR |
| 1996 (Jan.) | Andre Cooper | Florida State | WR |
| 1996 (Jan.) | Derrick Mayes | Notre Dame | WR |
| 1996 (Dec.) | Damon Benning | Nebraska | RB |
| 1996 (Dec.) | Ken Oxendine | Virginia Tech | RB |
| 1998 | Ahman Green | Nebraska | RB |
| 1998 | Jamal Lewis | Tennessee | RB |
| 1999 | Travis Taylor | Florida | WR |
| 2000 | David Terrell | Michigan | WR |
| 2001 | Torrance Marshall | Oklahoma | LB |
| 2002 | Taylor Jacobs | Florida | WR |
| 2003 | Carson Palmer | USC | QB |
| 2004 | Jarrett Payton | Miami (Fla.) | RB |
| 2005 | Matt Leinart | USC | QB |
| 2006 | Willie Reid | Florida State | WR |
| 2007 | Brian Brohm | Louisville | QB |
| 2008 | Aqib Talib | Kansas | CB |
| 2009 | Darren Evans | Virginia Tech | RB |
| 2010 | Adrian Clayborn | Iowa | DE |
| 2011 | Andrew Luck | Stanford | QB |
| 2012 | Geno Smith | West Virginia | QB |
| 2013 | Lonnie Pryor | Florida State | FB |
| 2014 (Jan.) | Sammy Watkins | Clemson | WR |
| 2014 (Dec.) | Justin Thomas | Georgia Tech | QB |
| 2015† | Deshaun Watson | Clemson | QB |
| 2015† | Ben Boulware | Clemson | LB |
| 2016 | Dalvin Cook | Florida State | RB |
| 2017 | Alex Hornibrook | Wisconsin | QB |
| 2018† | Tua Tagovailoa | Alabama | QB |
| 2018† | Xavier McKinney | Alabama | S |
| 2019 | La'Mical Perine | Florida | RB |
| 2021 (Jan.) | De'Von Achane | Texas A&M | RB |
| 2021 (Dec.)† | Stetson Bennett | Georgia | QB |
| 2021 (Dec.)† | Derion Kendrick | Georgia | CB |
| 2022 | Joe Milton | Tennessee | QB |
| 2023 | Kendall Milton | Georgia | RB |
| 2025† | Riley Leonard | Notre Dame | QB |
| 2025† | Christian Gray | Notre Dame | CB |
| 2026† | Dante Moore | Oregon | QB |
| 2026† | Brandon Finney Jr. | Oregon | CB |

† CFP semifinal or quarterfinal

== Most appearances ==
Updated through the January 2026 edition (92 games, 184 total appearances).

Teams with multiple appearances

| Rank | Team | Appearances | Record | Win pct. |
|---|---|---|---|---|
| 1 | Oklahoma | 20 | 12–8 | .600 |
| 2 | Nebraska | 17 | 8–9 | .471 |
| 3 | Florida State | 11 | 5–6 | .455 |
| 4 | Miami (FL) | 10 | 6–4 | .600 |
| 5 | Alabama | 9 | 5–4 | .556 |
| T6 | Clemson | 7 | 4–3 | .571 |
| T6 | Georgia Tech | 7 | 4–3 | .571 |
| T8 | Penn State | 6 | 4–2 | .667 |
| T8 | Notre Dame | 6 | 3–3 | .500 |
| T10 | Georgia | 5 | 4–1 | .800 |
| T10 | Colorado | 5 | 2–3 | .400 |
| T10 | LSU | 5 | 2–3 | .400 |
| T10 | Tennessee | 5 | 2–3 | .400 |
| T14 | Florida | 4 | 4–0 | 1.000 |
| T14 | Michigan | 4 | 1–3 | .250 |
| T14 | Missouri | 4 | 1–3 | .250 |
| T14 | Virginia Tech | 4 | 1–3 | .250 |

| Rank | Team | Appearances | Record | Win pct. |
|---|---|---|---|---|
| T18 | Kansas | 3 | 1–2 | .333 |
| T18 | Mississippi State | 3 | 1–2 | .333 |
| T18 | Maryland | 3 | 0–3 | .000 |
| T18 | Syracuse | 3 | 0–3 | .000 |
| T22 | Texas | 2 | 2–0 | 1.000 |
| T22 | USC | 2 | 1–0 | 1.000 ‡ |
| T22 | Arkansas | 2 | 1–1 | .500 |
| T22 | Auburn | 2 | 1–1 | .500 |
| T22 | Duke | 2 | 1–1 | .500 |
| T22 | Iowa | 2 | 1–1 | .500 |
| T22 | Ohio State | 2 | 1–1 | .500 |
| T22 | Texas A&M | 2 | 1–1 | .500 |

‡ USC's win–loss record and winning percentage exclude their vacated 2005 win.

Teams with a single appearance

Won (12): Bucknell, Catholic, Duquesne, Louisville, Oregon, Rice, Santa Clara, Stanford, Tulsa, Washington, West Virginia, Wisconsin
Lost (15): Baylor, Boston College, Cincinnati, Georgetown, Holy Cross, Kentucky, Michigan State, Navy, North Carolina, Northern Illinois, Ole Miss, TCU, Texas Tech, Virginia, Wake Forest

== Appearances by conference ==
Updated through the January 2026 edition (92 games, 184 total appearances).

| Rank | Conference | Appearances | Record | | | # of Teams | Teams (Note: Within each conference, teams are ordered by their number of appearances; if multiple teams have the same number of appearances, they are ordered by winning percentage; if that is also equal, they are listed alphabetically.) |
| Rank | Conference | Appearances | W | L | Win % | # of Teams | Teams |
|---|---|---|---|---|---|---|---|
| 1 | Big Eight | 42 | 20 | 22 | .476 | 5 | Oklahoma (11–5) (Note: Oklahoma: Big Eight and Big 12); Nebraska (6–9) (Note: Nebraska: Big Eight and Big 12); Colorado (2–3); Missouri (1–3); Kansas (0–2) (Note: Kansas: Big Eight and Big 12) |
| 2 | SEC | 40 | 23 | 17 | .575 | 11 | Alabama (5–4); Georgia (4–1); LSU (2–3); Tennessee (2–3); Florida (4–0); Georgia Tech (3–1) (Note: Georgia Tech: SEC, independent, and ACC); Mississippi State (1–2); Auburn (1–1); Texas A&M (1–0) (Note: Texas A&M: SWC and SEC); Kentucky (0–1); Ole Miss (0–1) |
| 3 | ACC | 29 | 11 | 18 | .379 | 10 | Florida State (5–4) (Note: Florida State: independent and ACC); Clemson (3–3) (Note: Clemson: SoCon and ACC); Virginia Tech (1–2) (Note: Virginia Tech: Big East and ACC); Maryland (0–3); Duke (1–1); Georgia Tech (1–1); Miami (FL) (0–1) (Note: Miami (FL): SIAA, independent, Big East, and ACC); North Carolina (0–1); Virginia (0–1); Wake Forest (0–1) |
| 4 | Independent | 29 | 14 | 15 | .483 | 15 | Notre Dame (3–3); Miami (FL) (4–1); Penn State (3–1) (Note: Penn State: independent and Big Ten); Florida State (0–2); Syracuse (0–2) (Note: Syracuse: independent and Big East); Bucknell (1–0); Catholic (1–0); Duquesne (1–0); Santa Clara (1–0); Boston College (0–1); Georgetown (0–1); Georgia Tech (0–1); Holy Cross (0–1); Michigan State (0–1); Navy (0–1) |
| 5 | Big Ten | 12 | 6 | 6 | .500 | 6 | Michigan (1–3); Iowa (1–1); Ohio State (1–1); Penn State (1–1); Wisconsin (1–0); Oregon (1–0) |
| 6 (tie) | Big 12 | 8 | 4 | 4 | .500 | 4 | Oklahoma (1–3); Nebraska (2–0); Kansas (1–0); Texas Tech (0–1) |
| 6 (tie) | Big East | 8 | 4 | 4 | .500 | 6 | Miami (FL) (2–1); Louisville (1–0); West Virginia (1–0); Cincinnati (0–1); Syracuse (0–1); Virginia Tech (0–1) |
| 6 (tie) | SWC | 8 | 4 | 4 | .500 | 6 | Texas (2–0); Arkansas (1–1); Rice (1–0); Baylor (0–1); TCU (0–1); Texas A&M (0–1) |
| 9 | Pac-12 | 4 | 3 | 0 | 1.000 ‡ | 3 | USC (1–0) ‡; Stanford (1–0); Washington (1–0) |
| 10 (tie) | SoCon | 1 | 1 | 0 | 1.000 | 1 | Clemson (1–0) |
| 10 (tie) | MVC | 1 | 1 | 0 | 1.000 | 1 | Tulsa (1–0) |
| 10 (tie) | MAC | 1 | 0 | 1 | .000 | 1 | Northern Illinois (0–1) |
| 10 (tie) | SIAA | 1 | 0 | 1 | .000 | 1 | Miami (FL) (0–1) |

‡ The Pac-12's win–loss record and winning percentage exclude USC's vacated 2005 win.

- Conferences that are defunct or not currently active in FBS appear in italics.
- Big Eight records include results when the conference was known as the Big Six and Big Seven.
- Pac-12 records include results when the conference was known as the Pacific-10.
- Multiple teams have played in the bowl as members of different conferences at different times:

== Game records ==
| Team | Record, Team vs. Opponent | Year |
|---|---|---|
| Most points scored (one team) | 70, West Virginia vs. Clemson | 2012 |
| Most points scored (losing team) | 35, Ohio State vs. Clemson | Jan. 2014 |
| Most points scored (both teams) | 103, West Virginia (70) vs. Clemson (33) | 2012 |
| Fewest points allowed | 0, 9 times, most recent: Oregon vs. Texas Tech | 2026 |
| Largest margin of victory | 60, Georgia (63) vs. Florida State (3) | 2023 |
| Total yards | 673, Georgia vs. Florida State | 2023 |
| Rushing yards | 452, Georgia Tech vs. Mississippi State | 2014 |
| Passing yards | 456, Florida vs. Maryland | 2002 |
| First downs | 37, Georgia vs. Florida State | 2023 |
| Fewest yards allowed | 28, Bucknell vs. Miami | 1935 |
| Fewest rushing yards allowed | –8, Missouri vs. Navy | 1961 |
| Fewest passing yards allowed | 0, shared by: Holy Cross vs. Miami; Tennessee vs. Rice | 1946; 1947 |
| Individual | Record, Player, Team vs. Opponent | Year |
| All-purpose yards | 280, Tavon Austin, West Virginia vs. Clemson (123 receiving, 117 return, 40 rush) | 2012 |
| Touchdowns (all-purpose) | 4, shared by: Tavon Austin, West Virginia vs. Clemson; Johnny Rodgers, Nebraska vs. Notre Dame | 2012; 1973 |
| Rushing yards | 206, Ahman Green, Nebraska vs. Tennessee | 1998 |
| Rushing touchdowns | 3, most recent: Synjyn Days, Georgia Tech vs. Mississippi State; Justin Thomas, Georgia Tech vs. Mississippi State | 2014; 2014 |
| Passing yards | 453, Dak Prescott, Mississippi State vs. Georgia Tech | 2014 |
| Passing touchdowns | 6, Geno Smith, West Virginia vs. Clemson | 2012 |
| Receiving yards | 227, Sammy Watkins, Clemson vs. Ohio State | 2014 |
| Receiving touchdowns | 4, Tavon Austin, West Virginia vs. Clemson | 2012 |
| Tackles | 31 (total), Lee Roy Jordan, Alabama vs. Oklahoma; 13 (solo), most recently: Brian Bosworth, Oklahoma vs. Penn State | 1963 1986 |
| Sacks | 4, Rusty Medearis, Miami vs. Nebraska | 1992 |
| Interceptions | 3, Bud Hebert, Oklahoma vs. Florida State | 1980 |
| Long Plays | Record, Player, Team vs. Opponent | Year |
| Touchdown run | 94, Larry Smith, Florida vs. Georgia Tech | 1967 |
| Touchdown pass | 92, Nyqwan Murray from Deondre Francois, Florida State vs. Michigan | 2016 |
| Kickoff return | 100, C. J. Jones, Iowa vs. USC | 2003 |
| Punt return | 87, Willie Reid, Florida State vs. Penn State | 2006 |
| Interception return | 94, David Baker, Oklahoma vs. Duke | 1958 |
| Fumble return | 99, Darwin Cook, West Virginia vs. Clemson | 2012 |
| Punt | 82, Ike Pickle, Mississippi State vs. Duquesne | 1937 |
| Field goal | 56, Greg Cox, Miami vs. Oklahoma | 1988 |

== Sponsorship ==
The game was previously officially known as the Discover Orange Bowl, since Discover Financial was announced as title sponsor on August 26, 2010, as part of a new four-year agreement. The game had been called the FedEx Orange Bowl from 1989 to 2010, as FedEx sponsored the event during that period. Starting with the 2010–11 season, ESPN carried the Orange Bowl, replacing Fox after four seasons. ABC aired the game from 1999 to 2006, with CBS (1995–1998) and NBC (1964–1994) previously carrying the game.

Discover stated that they would not renew their sponsorship of the game further on June 9, 2014; the game will be a part of the College Football Playoff in the future, and CFP rightsholder ESPN has asked for higher sponsorship fees, in return. On September 22, 2014, Capital One was announced as the new title sponsor of the Orange Bowl, transferring their bowl game sponsorship from the Citrus Bowl. Subsequently, the company's "Capital One Mascot Challenge" winner naming ceremony also moved to the Orange Bowl. The Orange Bowl Committee includes Corporate Members such as iHeart Media, Ernst & Young, Cinch Home Services, Bank of America, Amazon, American Airlines, AT&T, and Uber Technologies.

== Broadcasting ==
ESPN is the current rightsholder of the Orange Bowl, a relationship that began in 2011 as part of the contract to broadcast the Bowl Championship Series games. In anticipation of the transition to the College Football Playoff in the 2014–15 season, ESPN reached a new deal with the game's organizers in November 2012 to extend its rights through 2026, paying $55 million yearly. The game is also broadcast nationally by ESPN Radio.

Prior to that, Fox held the rights to the event (along with the other BCS bowls) since 2007, preceded by ABC (1999–2006 and 1962–64), CBS (1996–98 and 1953–61), and NBC (1965–95). This game, along with the Fiesta Bowl, is one of only two bowl games ever to air on all the "big 4" U.S. television networks. ESPN Deportes added a Spanish language telecast of the game in 2013.

== See also ==
- List of college bowl games
