= 2003 Miami Hurricanes football team =

American college football season

2003 Miami Hurricanes football

Big East co-champion Florida Cup champion Orange Bowl champion

Orange Bowl, W 16–14 vs. Florida State
- Conference: Big East Conference

Ranking
- Coaches: No. 5
- AP: No. 5
- Record: 11–2 (6–1 Big East)
- Head coach: Larry Coker (3rd season)
- Offensive coordinator: Rob Chudzinski (3rd season)
- Offensive scheme: Pro-style
- Defensive coordinator: Randy Shannon (3rd season)
- Base defense: 4–3 Cover 2
- Home stadium: Miami Orange Bowl (Capacity: 72,319)

2003 Big East Conference football standings
	Conf.			Overall
Team	W		L	W		L
No. 5 Miami (FL) $+	6	–	1	11	–	2
West Virginia +	6	–	1	8	–	5
Pittsburgh	5	–	2	8	–	5
Virginia Tech	4	–	3	8	–	5
Boston College	3	–	4	8	–	5
Syracuse	2	–	5	6	–	6
Rutgers	2	–	5	5	–	7
Temple	0	–	7	1	–	11
$ – BCS representative as conference champion; + – Conference co-champions; Rankings from AP Poll

The 2003 Miami Hurricanes football team represented the University of Miami during the 2003 NCAA Division I-A football season. It was the Hurricanes' 78th season of football and 13th and final as a member of the Big East Conference. The Hurricanes were led by third-year head coach Larry Coker and played their home games at the Orange Bowl. They finished the season 11–2 overall and 6–1 in the Big East to finish as conference co-champion. They were invited to the Orange Bowl where they defeated Florida State, 16–14.

Miami's 500th victory in program history came against West Virginia on October 2.

== Schedule ==
Date	Time	Opponent	Rank	Site	TV	Result	Attendance	Source
August 28	7:30 pm	vs. Louisiana Tech*	No. 3	Independence Stadium; Shreveport, LA	ESPN	W 48–9	43,279	
September 6	8:00 pm	No. 21 Florida*	No. 3	Miami Orange Bowl; Miami, FL (rivalry)	ABC	W 38–33	79,932	
September 13	7:00 pm	East Carolina*	No. 2	Miami Orange Bowl; Miami, FL	ESPN2	W 38–3	65,825	
September 20	7:45 pm	at Boston College	No. 2	Alumni Stadium; Chestnut Hill, MA	ESPN	W 33–14	44,500	
October 2	7:30 pm	West Virginia	No. 2	Miami Orange Bowl; Miami, FL	ESPN	W 22–20	54,621	
October 11	12:00 pm	at No. 5 Florida State*	No. 2	Doak Campbell Stadium; Tallahassee, FL (rivalry, College GameDay)	ABC	W 22–14	84,336	
October 18	12:00 pm	Temple	No. 2	Miami Orange Bowl; Miami, FL	ESPN Plus	W 52–14	49,144	
November 1	7:45 pm	at No. 10 Virginia Tech	No. 2	Lane Stadium; Blacksburg, VA (rivalry)	ESPN	L 7–31	65,115	
November 8	12:00 pm	No. 18 Tennessee*	No. 6	Miami Orange Bowl; Miami, FL	ABC	L 6–10	69,722	
November 15	12:00 pm	Syracuse^{†}	No. 14	Miami Orange Bowl; Miami, FL	ESPN Plus	W 17–10	48,130	
November 22	12:00 pm	Rutgers	No. 13	Miami Orange Bowl; Miami, FL	ESPN Plus	W 34–10	39,572	
November 29	8:00 pm	at No. 20 Pittsburgh	No. 10	Heinz Field; Pittsburgh, PA	ABC	W 28–14	60,486	
January 1	8:30 pm	vs. No. 9 Florida State*	No. 10	Pro Player Stadium; Miami Gardens, FL (Orange Bowl)	ABC	W 16–14	76,739	
*Non-conference game; ^{†}Homecoming; Rankings from AP Poll released prior to the game; All times are in Eastern time

== Rankings ==
Ranking movements Legend: ██ Increase in ranking ██ Decrease in ranking ( ) = First-place votes
	Week																
Poll	Pre	1	2	3	4	5	6	7	8	9	10	11	12	13	14	15	Final
AP	3 (2)	3 (2)	2 (2)	2 (3)	2 (3)	2 (3)	2 (1)	2 (3)	2 (3)	2 (3)	6	14	13	10	10	10	5
Coaches	3 (5)	3 (5)	2 (8)	2 (8)	2 (6)	2 (8)	2 (4)	2 (5)	2 (6)	2 (5)	7	14	13	10	10	9	5
BCS	Not released								2	2	4	12	12	10	10	9	Not released

== Game summaries ==
=== Florida ===
#18 Florida at #3 Miami (FL)

Team	1	2	3	4	Total
Florida	10	9	14	0	33
• Miami (FL)	10	0	15	13	38

- Date: September 6
- Location: Orange Bowl, Miami
- Game start: 8:00 p.m. EST
- TV announcers (ABC): Brad Nessler (Play-by-play), Bob Griese (Color) & Lynn Swann (Sideline)

Scoring summary
Q1	14:47	MIA	Devin Hester 97 yard kickoff return (Jon Peattie kick)	MIA 7–0
Q1	9:25	FLA	Matt Leach 26 yard field goal	MIA 7–3
Q1	6:08	MIA	Jon Peattie 27 yard field goal	MIA 10–3
Q1	4:15	FLA	Carlos Perez 50 yard pass from Ingle Martin (Matt Leach kick)	Tie 10–10
Q2	11:36	FLA	Keiwan Ratliff 34 yard fumble return (pass failed)	FLA 16–10
Q2	:11	FLA	Matt Leach 30 yard field goal	FLA 19–10
Q3	14:49	FLA	DeShawn Wynn 65 yard run (Matt Leach kick)	FLA 26–10
Q3	6:10	FLA	Ran Carthon 4 yard run (Matt Leach kick)	FLA 33–10
Q3	3:35	MIA	Kevin Beard 26 yard pass from Brock Berlin (Ryan Moore pass from Brock Berlin)	FLA 33–18
Q3	:33	MIA	Frank Gore 1 yard run (Jon Peattie kick)	FLA 33–25
Q4	11:08	MIA	Ryan Moore 6 yard pass from Brock Berlin (Jon Peattie kick)	FLA 33–32
Q4	1:44	MIA	Frank Gore 12 yard run (pass failed)	MIA 38–33

=== Florida State ===
Miami (FL) Hurricanes (5–0) at Florida State Seminoles (5–0)

Quarter	1	2	3	4	Total
Miami (FL)	6	13	3	0	22
Florida St	0	0	7	7	14

at Doak Campbell Stadium • Tallahassee, Florida

- Date: October 11
- Game time: 12:00 p.m. EDT
- Game weather: Rain • 75 °F (24 °C) • Wind SE 7 miles per hour (11 km/h; 6.1 kn)
- Game attendance: 84,336
- Referee: Jack Cramer
- TV: ABC
- Box Score

Game information

Miami (FL)

- Brock Berlin
  15/28, 181 Yds, TD, 3 INT
- Jarrett Payton
  26 Rush, 97 Yds
- Kellen Winslow
  7 Rec, 106 Yds

Florida State

- Chris Rix
  20/42, 235 Yds, 2 TD, 2 INT
- Leon Washington
  6 Rush, 26 Yds
- P.K. Sam
  5 Rec, 95 Yds

Scoring summary

Quarter	Time	Drive			Team	Scoring information	Score	
Quarter	Time	Plays	Yards	TOP	Team	Scoring information	MIA	FSU
1	5:16	4	5	1:32	Miami (FL)	27-yard field goal by Jon Peattie	3	0
1	3:17	6	28	1:59	Miami (FL)	22-yard field goal by Jon Peattie	6	0
2	11:26	11	75	3:29	Miami (FL)	Jarrett Payton 14-yard touchdown reception from Brock Berlin, 2-point pass failed	12	0
2	3:11				Miami (FL)	Interception returned 50 yards for touchdown by Sean Taylor, Jon Peattie kick good	19	0
3	11:26	4	9	1:47	Miami (FL)	19-yard field goal by Jon Peattie	22	0
3	4:51	1	18	0:06	Florida State	Willie Reid 18-yard touchdown reception from Chris Rix, Xavier Beitia kick good	22	7
4	0:00	6	64	1:06	Florida State	Chris Davis 17-yard touchdown reception from Chris Rix, Xavier Beitia kick good	22	14
"TOP" = time of possession. For other American football terms, see Glossary of American football.							22	14

== Roster ==
2003 Miami Hurricanes football team roster
Players
Coaches
Offense

Pos.	#	Name	Class
WR	1	Roscoe Parrish	So
WR	3	Jason Geathers	Sr
WR	4	Devin Hester	Fr
QB	7	Brock Berlin	Jr
WR	8	Darnell Jenkins	Fr
WR	9	Kevin Beard	Sr
QB	12	Marc Guillon	Fr
WR	15	Buck Ortega	So
QB	16	Kyle Wright	Fr
QB	18	Derrick Crudup	Sr
WR	22	Kelly Jennings	So
FB	23	Quadtrine Hill	So
FB	27	Jeff Malley	So
WR	29	Tanard Davis	So
RB	30	Tyrone Moss	Fr
RB	32	Frank Gore	So
RB	34	Jarrett Payton	Sr
FB	40	Kyle Cobia	Jr
FB	41	Talib Humphrey	Jr
FB	46	Jean Volcy	Fr
TE	49	Kurt Stange	So
OL	52	Matt Harper	So
OL	53	Jim Sikora	Sr
OL	59	Brad Kunz	Jr
OT	60	Vernon Carey	Sr
OL	61	Tony Tella	So
OL	63	Alex Pou	Fr
OL	64	Rashad Butler	So
OL	65	Alex Garcia	Sr
OL	66	Chris Napoli	Fr
OL	66	John Rochford	Fr
OL	67	Joe McGrath	Sr
OL	70	Joel Robinson	Jr
OL	71	Derrick Morse	Fr
OL	72	Andrew Bain	Fr
OL	73	Cyrim Wimbs	Fr
OL	74	Eric Winston	So
OT	76	Carlos Joseph	Sr
G	77	Chris Myers	Jr
OL	78	Anthony Wollschlager	Fr
OL	79	Robert Bergman	So
WR	80	Akieem Jolla	Fr
TE	81	Kellen Winslow II	Jr
WR	83	Sinorice Moss	Jr
TE	84	Kevin Everett	Jr
WR	85	Ryan Moore	Fr
TE	86	Brandon Sebald	So
FB		Jonathan Mann	Sr

Defense

Pos.	#	Name	Class
LB	2	Jon Beason	Fr
DB	5	Greg Threat	So
CB	6	Antrel Rolle	Jr
LB	17	D.J. Williams	Sr
DB	19	Brandon Meriweather	Fr
DB	20	Terrell Walden	Fr
DB	21	Travarous Bain	Fr
DB	24	Marcus Maxey	Fr
CB	25	Alfonso Marshall	Sr
S	26	Sean Taylor	Jr
DB	28	Willie Cooper	Fr
DB	31	Glenn Sharpe	So
DB	35	Tim Kelly	So
DB	36	Maurice Sikes	Sr
DB	37	Michael Langley	Sr
LB	38	Carl Walker	Sr
LB	43	Leo Waiters	Fr
LB	44	Leon Williams	So
LB	45	Arlington Highsmith	Fr
DL	47	Vegas Franklin	Fr
LB	47	Christopher Timpson	Jr
LB	49	Darrell McClover	Sr
LB	50	Roger McIntosh	So
LB	51	Jonathan Vilma	Sr
LB	52	Tavares Gooden	Fr
DL	54	Teraz McCray	Fr
LB	55	Glenn Cook	Fr
DL	56	Santonio Thomas	Jr
DE	57	Javon Nanton	So
LB	58	Jarrell Weaver	Sr
DL	68	Nate Robinson	Fr
NT	75	Vince Wilfork	Jr
DL	82	David Williams	Jr
DL	87	Dave Howell	Fr
DL	90	Thomas Carroll	So
DL	91	Eric Moncur	Fr
DL	92	Orien Harris	So
DL	93	John Square	Jr
DL	95	Bryan Pata	Fr
DL	96	Alton Wright	Jr
DL	97	Larry Anderson	Sr
DL	98	Baraka Atkins	Fr
DL	99	Kareem Brown	Fr

Special teams

Pos.	#	Name	Class
P	10	Matt Carter	Jr
K/P	13	Jon Peattie	Fr
K/P	30	Francesco Zampogna	Fr
K	33	Mark Gent	So
P	39	Brian Monroe	Fr
LS	62	Chris Harvey	Sr
LS	88	Curtis Justus	Fr

Head coach

- Larry Coker

Coordinators/assistant coaches

- Rob Chudzinski (OC/TE)
- Don Soldinger (STC/RB)
- Randy Shannon (DC/LB)

Legend

- (C) Team captain
- (S) Suspended
- (I) Ineligible
- Injured
- Redshirt

Roster
