= 2004 Orange Bowl =

2004 FedEx Orange Bowl
- BCS Bowl Game; 70th Orange Bowl
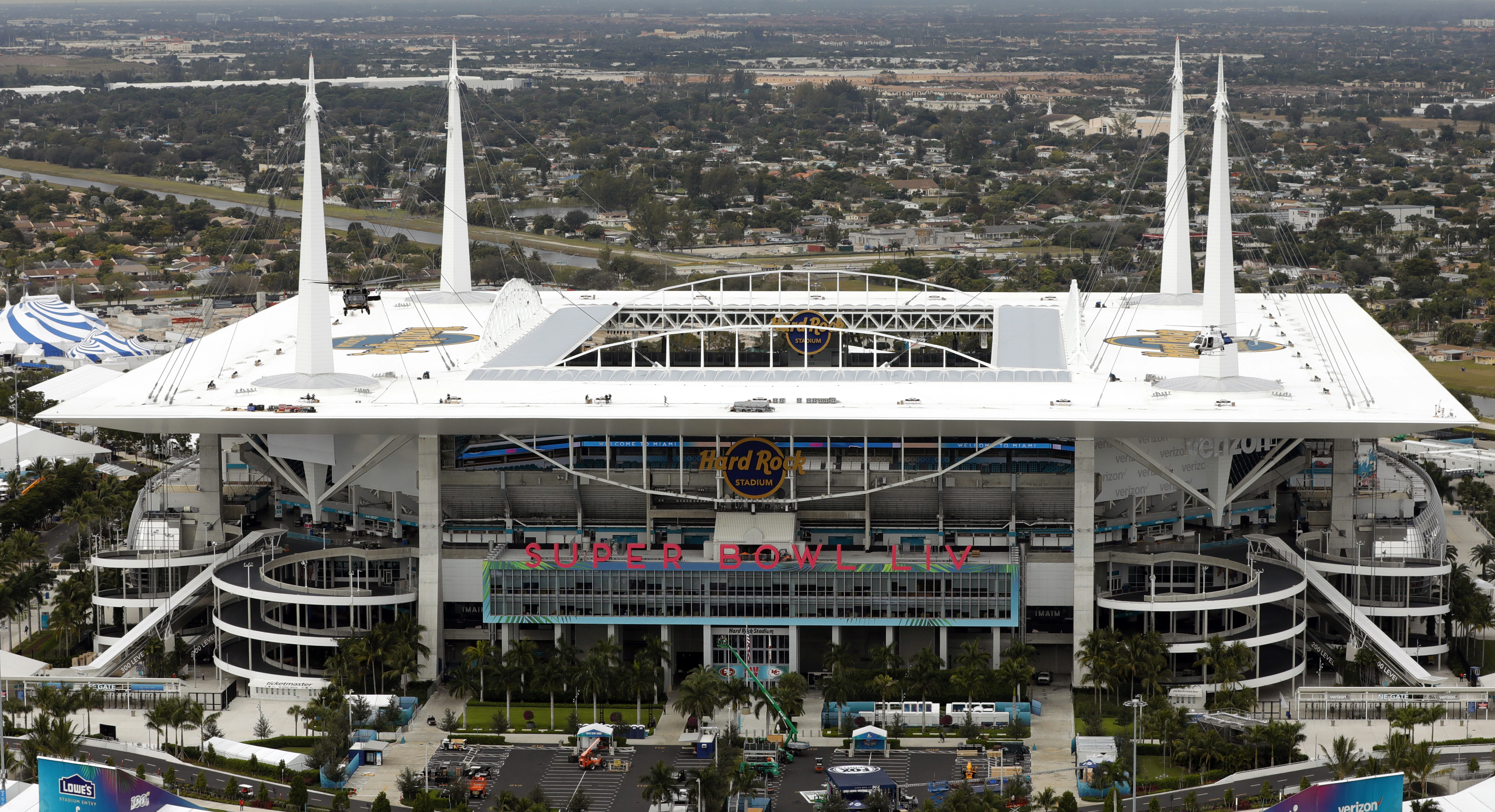
- Pro Player Stadium in Miami Gardens, Florida, hosted the Orange Bowl.
Miami Hurricanes	Florida State Seminoles
(10–2)	(10–2)
Big East	ACC
16	14
Head coach: Larry Coker	Head coach: Bobby Bowden
AP / Coaches / BCS; 10 / 9 / 9	AP / Coaches / BCS; 9 / 8 / 7
	1	2	3	4	Total
Miami	3	10	3	0	16
Florida State	0	14	0	0	14
- Date: January 1, 2004
- Season: 2003
- Stadium: Pro Player Stadium
- Location: Miami Gardens, Florida
- MVP: Miami RB Jarrett Payton
- Favorite: Florida State by 1.5 (46.5)
- Referee: Dick Honig (Big Ten)
- Attendance: 76,739

United States TV coverage
- Network: ABC
- Announcers: Brad Nessler (Play by Play); Bob Griese (Analyst); Lynn Swann (Sideline)
- Nielsen ratings: 9.1

The 2004 FedEx Orange Bowl game was a post-season college football bowl game that featured an all-Florida matchup between the Miami Hurricanes and the Florida State Seminoles on January 1, 2004, at Pro Player Stadium in Miami Gardens, Florida. Miami defeated Florida State 16–14 in a stout defensive battle. The game was part of the 2003–2004 Bowl Championship Series (BCS) of the 2003 NCAA Division I-A football season and represented the concluding game of the season for both teams. The Orange Bowl was first played in 1935, and the 2004 game represented the 70th edition of the Orange Bowl. The contest was televised in the United States on ABC.

This bowl rematch was unique because it meant that the teams would play each other three times in less than a year. Miami had already beaten Florida State 22–14 earlier in the season. In addition, Miami would open up the following season against Florida State at home, meaning Florida State would have to play Miami in Miami for two straight games.

This was Miami’s last victory in a major bowl game until 2025.

== Summary ==
Miami received the ball to begin the game and scored on the first possession off a 32-yard field goal from Jon Peattie. That was the only scoring of the first quarter as both teams' quarterbacks threw interceptions. Sean Taylor intercepted Seminole quarterback Chris Rix while Jerome Carter intercepted Miami quarterback Brock Berlin. Carter's interception set up the Seminoles with the ball on their own 30-yard line. Chris Rix found Chauncey Stovall for a 52-yard gain putting the Seminoles in Miami territory.

On the first play of the second quarter Florida State took the lead off of a direct snap to Lorenzo Booker that he ran into the endzone, giving the Seminoles the lead. Florida State got the ball back after forcing Miami to punt. Greg Jones had a 24-yard run during the Seminoles possession to set up a Chris Rix touchdown pass to Matt Henshaw. Florida State now had a 14-3 lead. On Miami's ensuing possession Jarrett Payton took a handoff on third and two for 47 yards. The Hurricanes would get another five yards off a penalty to put them on the Seminoles 25-yard line. Three plays later Tyrone Moss ran into the endzone on a 3-yard rush. Aided by a five-yard penalty the Hurricanes were able to get the Seminoles to go three and out and got the ball back with three minutes and forty four seconds at their own 24-yard line. After a penalty on the Hurricanes, Brock Berlin found wide receiver Ryan Moore open for a 41-yard gain putting the Hurricanes on the Seminoles 35-yard line. The Hurricanes were able to move to as close as the Seminoles 13-yard line, however two sacks forced the Hurricanes to settle for a field goal and go into halftime down 13-14.

On the opening kickoff of the second half Antonio Cromartie was only able take the kickoff four yards and the Seminoles got the ball on their own 13-yard line. The Seminoles were unable to do anything and were forced to punt the ball which Miami would return 7 yards to their own 47-yard line. On third and seven Berlin was able to find Kellen Winslow for a 12-yard gain. On third and thirteen Miami completed a 2-yard pass to Jason Geathers coming up 11 yards short of a first down. However Florida State was penalized five yards on the play. This was crucial because now the Hurricanes could attempt a 51-yard field goal as opposed to a 56-yard field goal. The Hurricanes did attempt the 51-yard field goal and it was good. Jon Peattie gave the Hurricanes a 16-14 lead. Both teams' offense were stagnant the rest of the game. The Seminoles did not cross the 50-yard line the remainder of the quarter. The Hurricanes had a great opportunity to capitalize when Jonathan Vilma recovered a Seminole fumble at the Hurricane 40-yard line. On the ensuing Hurricane possession Berlin found Geathers on third down for a 25-yard gain to put the Hurricanes in Seminole territory. However Berlin threw an interception on the offense's following third down to Eric Moore. The Seminoles were unable to capitalize on the turnover and went three and out.

Randy Shannon's defense forced the Seminoles to go three and out on their first two drives of the fourth quarter. Following the Seminoles second punt of the quarter the Hurricanes faced a third and one situation on their own 30. Berlin was unable to rush for the first down on third down and the Hurricanes decided to go for it on fourth down. Berlin would end up fumbling the ball on fourth down giving the Seminoles the ball on the Hurricanes 30-yard line. The Seminoles offense was unable to take pickup a first down and had to attempt a field goal. Seminole kicker Xavier Beitia lined up to attempt a 39-yard field goal to give the Seminoles the lead. The previous season Beitia had an opportunity to beat the top ranked Hurricanes at the Miami Orange Bowl on a 43-yard attempt, Beitia missed the kick wide left and the Seminoles lost. Beitia's kick went wide right and the Seminoles still trailed, 14-16. The Hurricanes got the ball back and were not able to do anything on their first three downs, and it appeared they would punt on fourth down. However, the Hurricanes faked a punt on a direct snap to D.J. Williams who rushed up the middle for 33 yards. This gave the Hurricanes good field position in Seminole territory. The Hurricanes would run the ball with Payton on two straight play to ice the clock. On third and two the Seminoles defense stopped Payton and the Hurricanes and forced them to attempt a field goal. Jon Peattie would attempt a 45-yard field goal that would be no good. The Seminoles would get one final possession to try to beat the Hurricanes however they were not able to do anything with it and the Hurricanes won by the final score of 16-14.

=== Scoring Summary ===
Scoring play	Score
1st quarter
MIA Jon Peattie 32-yard field goal, 11:32	MIA 3-0
2nd quarter
FSU Lorenzo Booker 10-yard run (Xavier Beitia kick), 14:54	FSU 7-3
FSU Matt Enshaw 10-yard pass from Chris Rix (Xavier Beitia kick), 8:41	FSU 14-3
MIA Tyrone Moss 3-yard run (Jon Peattie kick), 5:34	FSU 14-10
MIA Jon Peattie 44-yard field goal, 0:00	FSU 14-13
3rd quarter
MIA Jon Peattie 51-yard field goal, 10:19	MIA 16-14

== See also ==
- Florida State–Miami football rivalry
- List of college football post-season games that were rematches of regular season games
