= New Year's Six =

Term for NCAA Division I Football Bowl games played on or around New Year's Day

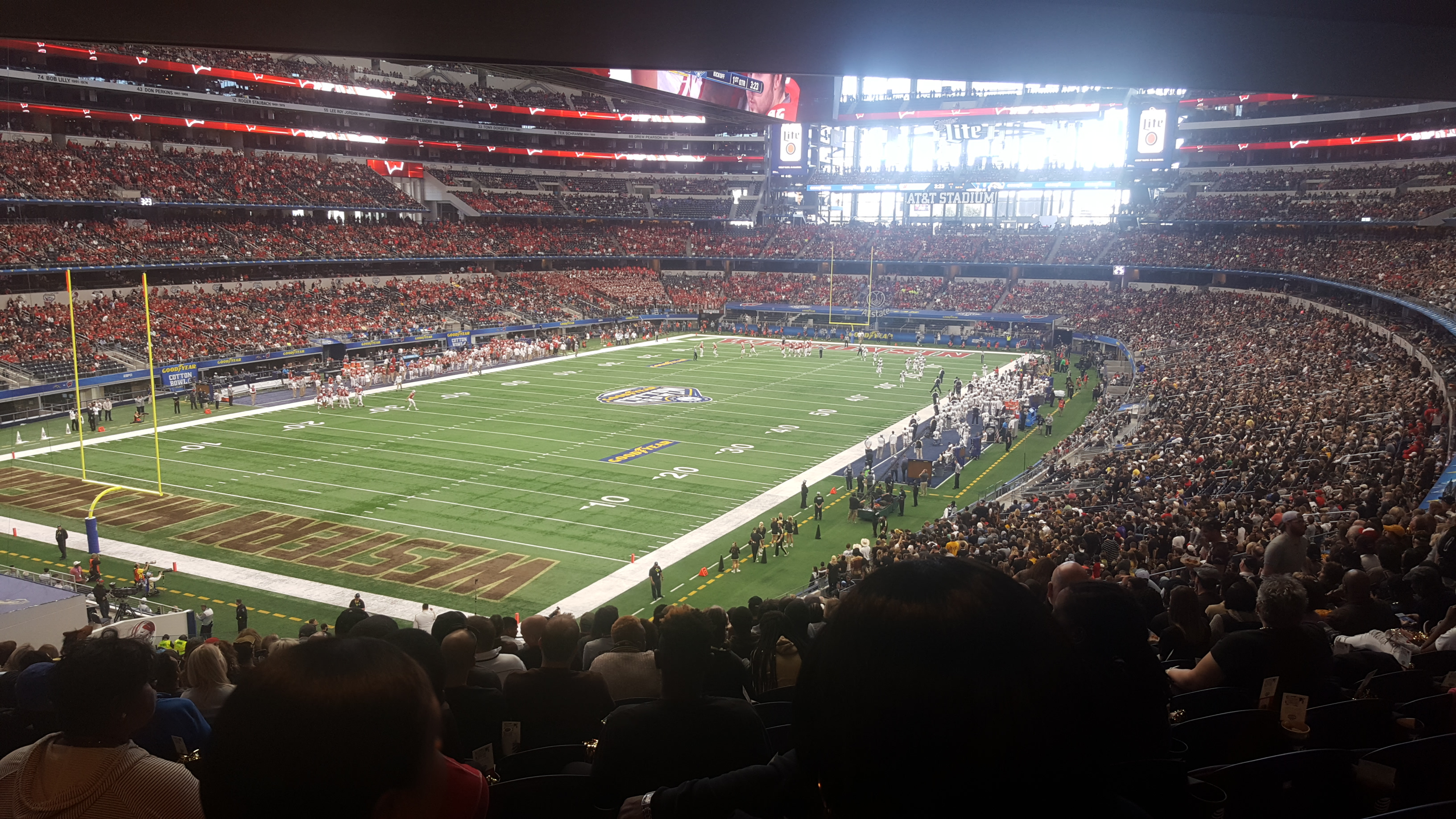
- The 2017 edition of the Cotton Bowl Classic, one of the New Year's Six bowl games
- In operation: 2014–present
- Preceded by: Bowl Championship Series (1998–2013); Bowl Alliance (1995–1997); Bowl Coalition (1992–1994)
- Television partner(s): ESPN (2014–present)
- Most bowl appearances: Ohio State (10)
- Most bowl wins: Alabama (9)
- Conference with most appearances: SEC (24)
- Conference with most game wins: SEC (20)

The New Year's Six, sometimes abbreviated as NY6, are a series of NCAA Division I Football Bowl Subdivision (FBS) bowl games: the Rose Bowl, Sugar Bowl, Orange Bowl, Cotton Bowl, Peach Bowl, and Fiesta Bowl. These games are traditionally played annually on or around New Year's Day and are considered the most prestigious bowl games played at the FBS level.

While the bowls themselves existed for decades before, the "New Year's Six" was created alongside the institution of the College Football Playoff (CFP) in 2014. For the 2014 through 2023 seasons, two of the New Year's Six games served as the two semifinal games in the four-team playoff, while teams appearing in the other four New Year's Six games were played as traditional bowl games, some with conference tie-ins. The six bowl games rotated the hosting of the two CFP semifinal games.

Since the CFP expanded to twelve teams for the 2024 season, the six bowls now host quarterfinal or semifinal games. The Sugar, Orange, Cotton, Peach, and Fiesta bowls will rotate hosting semifinal games.

== History ==
The Bowl Championship Series (BCS) was a selection system that created five bowl game match-ups involving ten of the top ranked teams in the NCAA Division I Football Bowl Subdivision (FBS), including an opportunity for the top two teams to compete in the BCS National Championship Game. The system was in place for the 1998 through 2013 seasons.

In June 2012, the BCS conference presidents approved the College Football Playoff (CFP), a four-team playoff, to replace the Bowl Championship Series. Three bowls—the Rose, Sugar, and Orange—because of their contracts with the power conferences, were selected to be part of the rotating semifinal playoff games, with three more bowls to be named. In years when these three bowls would not host a playoff game, matchups were determined using the traditional conference tie-ins for each bowl:

- Rose Bowl: Big Ten vs. Pac-12
- Sugar Bowl: SEC vs. Big 12
- Orange Bowl: ACC vs. Big Ten, SEC, or Notre Dame

Each conference champion would be selected first for the bowl corresponding to their conference's tie-in, though in instances where the conference champion was selected for the College Football Playoff, the next-highest-ranked team from that conference was selected. Conference commissioners also granted the highest-ranked Group of Five conference champion a guaranteed slot in one of the six bowl games. In July 2013, the Cotton Bowl Classic, the Fiesta Bowl, and the Peach Bowl were announced as the other three rotating semifinal playoff bowls, ahead of the Holiday Bowl. Each bowl would host a playoff game once every three years, and the rotation pairing were set as: Rose–Sugar, Orange–Cotton, and Peach–Fiesta.

When the playoff expanded to 12 teams beginning in 2024, all six bowls now host a playoff game on a yearly basis. Five of the bowls will rotate hosting semifinal games, with the Rose Bowl becoming a permanent quarterfinal game so it can maintain its traditional New Year's Day time. As a result, all conference tie-ins to the Rose, Sugar, and Orange bowls have been eliminated. Starting in 2026, the top three seeds in order will select their quarterfinal bowl and the top seed will select its potential semifinal bowl.

== Game results ==
Games are listed in chronological order, with final CFP rankings prior to the respective bowl being played.

=== 2014 season ===
Date	Bowl	Winning team		Losing team		Stadium	Location
December 31, 2014	Peach	6 TCU	42	9 Ole Miss	3	Georgia Dome	Atlanta, Georgia
December 31, 2014	Fiesta	20 Boise State	38	10 Arizona	30	University of Phoenix Stadium	Glendale, Arizona
December 31, 2014	Orange	12 Georgia Tech	49	7 Mississippi State	34	Sun Life Stadium	Miami Gardens, Florida
January 1, 2015	Cotton	8 Michigan State	42	5 Baylor	41	AT&T Stadium	Arlington, Texas
January 1, 2015	Rose (CFP semifinal)	2 Oregon	59	3 Florida State	20	Rose Bowl	Pasadena, California
January 1, 2015	Sugar (CFP semifinal)	4 Ohio State	42	1 Alabama	35	Mercedes-Benz Superdome	New Orleans, Louisiana

=== 2015 season ===
Date	Bowl	Winning team		Losing team		Stadium	Location
December 31, 2015	Peach	18 Houston	38	9 Florida State	24	Georgia Dome	Atlanta, Georgia
December 31, 2015	Orange (CFP semifinal)	1 Clemson	37	4 Oklahoma	17	Sun Life Stadium	Miami Gardens, Florida
December 31, 2015	Cotton (CFP semifinal)	2 Alabama	38	3 Michigan State	0	AT&T Stadium	Arlington, Texas
January 1, 2016	Fiesta	7 Ohio State	44	8 Notre Dame	28	University of Phoenix Stadium	Glendale, Arizona
January 1, 2016	Rose	6 Stanford	45	5 Iowa	16	Rose Bowl	Pasadena, California
January 1, 2016	Sugar	12 Ole Miss	48	16 Oklahoma State	20	Mercedes-Benz Superdome	New Orleans, Louisiana

=== 2016 season ===
Date	Bowl	Winning team		Losing team		Stadium	Location
December 30, 2016	Orange	11 Florida State	33	6 Michigan	32	Hard Rock Stadium	Miami Gardens, Florida
December 31, 2016	Peach (CFP semifinal)	1 Alabama	24	4 Washington	7	Georgia Dome	Atlanta, Georgia
December 31, 2016	Fiesta (CFP semifinal)	2 Clemson	31	3 Ohio State	0	University of Phoenix Stadium	Glendale, Arizona
January 2, 2017	Cotton Bowl	8 Wisconsin	24	15 Western Michigan	16	AT&T Stadium	Arlington, Texas
January 2, 2017	Rose	9 USC	52	5 Penn State	49	Rose Bowl	Pasadena, California
January 2, 2017	Sugar	7 Oklahoma	35	14 Auburn	19	Mercedes-Benz Superdome	New Orleans, Louisiana

=== 2017 season ===
Date	Bowl	Winning team		Losing team		Stadium	Location
December 29, 2017	Cotton	5 Ohio State	24	8 USC	7	AT&T Stadium	Arlington, Texas
December 30, 2017	Fiesta	9 Penn State	35	11 Washington	28	University of Phoenix Stadium	Glendale, Arizona
December 30, 2017	Orange	6 Wisconsin	34	10 Miami (FL)	24	Hard Rock Stadium	Miami Gardens, Florida
January 1, 2018	Peach	12 UCF	34	7 Auburn	27	Mercedes-Benz Stadium	Atlanta, Georgia
January 1, 2018	Rose (CFP semifinal)	3 Georgia	54^{2OT}	2 Oklahoma	48	Rose Bowl	Pasadena, California
January 1, 2018	Sugar (CFP semifinal)	4 Alabama	24	1 Clemson	6	Mercedes-Benz Superdome	New Orleans, Louisiana

=== 2018 season ===
Date	Bowl	Winning team		Losing team		Stadium	Location
December 29, 2018	Peach	10 Florida	41	7 Michigan	15	Mercedes-Benz Stadium	Atlanta, Georgia
December 29, 2018	Cotton (CFP semifinal)	2 Clemson	30	3 Notre Dame	3	AT&T Stadium	Arlington, Texas
December 29, 2018	Orange (CFP semifinal)	1 Alabama	45	4 Oklahoma	34	Hard Rock Stadium	Miami Gardens, Florida
January 1, 2019	Fiesta	11 LSU	40	8 UCF	32	State Farm Stadium	Glendale, Arizona
January 1, 2019	Rose	6 Ohio State	28	9 Washington	23	Rose Bowl	Pasadena, California
January 1, 2019	Sugar	15 Texas	28	5 Georgia	21	Mercedes-Benz Superdome	New Orleans, Louisiana

=== 2019 season ===
Date	Bowl	Winning team		Losing team		Stadium	Location
December 28, 2019	Cotton	10 Penn State	53	17 Memphis	39	AT&T Stadium	Arlington, Texas
December 28, 2019	Peach (CFP semifinal)	1 LSU	63	4 Oklahoma	28	Mercedes-Benz Stadium	Atlanta, Georgia
December 28, 2019	Fiesta (CFP semifinal)	3 Clemson	29	2 Ohio State	23	State Farm Stadium	Glendale, Arizona
December 30, 2019	Orange	9 Florida	36	24 Virginia	28	Hard Rock Stadium	Miami Gardens, Florida
January 1, 2020	Rose	6 Oregon	28	8 Wisconsin	27	Rose Bowl	Pasadena, California
January 1, 2020	Sugar	5 Georgia	26	7 Baylor	14	Mercedes-Benz Superdome	New Orleans, Louisiana

=== 2020 season ===
Date	Bowl	Winning team		Losing team		Stadium	Location
December 30, 2020	Cotton	6 Oklahoma	55	7 Florida	20	AT&T Stadium	Arlington, Texas
January 1, 2021	Peach	9 Georgia	24	8 Cincinnati	21	Mercedes-Benz Stadium	Atlanta, Georgia
January 1, 2021	Rose (CFP semifinal)	1 Alabama	31	4 Notre Dame	14	Rose Bowl	Pasadena, California
January 1, 2021	Sugar (CFP semifinal)	3 Ohio State	49	2 Clemson	28	Mercedes-Benz Superdome	New Orleans, Louisiana
January 2, 2021	Orange	5 Texas A&M	41	13 North Carolina	27	Hard Rock Stadium	Miami Gardens, Florida
January 2, 2021	Fiesta	10 Iowa State	34	25 Oregon	17	State Farm Stadium	Glendale, Arizona

=== 2021 season ===
Date	Bowl	Winning team		Losing team		Stadium	Location
December 30, 2021	Peach	10 Michigan State	31	12 Pittsburgh	21	Mercedes-Benz Stadium	Atlanta, Georgia
December 31, 2021	Cotton (CFP semifinal)	1 Alabama	27	4 Cincinnati	6	AT&T Stadium	Arlington, Texas
December 31, 2021	Orange (CFP semifinal)	3 Georgia	34	2 Michigan	11	Hard Rock Stadium	Miami Gardens, Florida
January 1, 2022	Fiesta	9 Oklahoma State	37	5 Notre Dame	35	State Farm Stadium	Glendale, Arizona
January 1, 2022	Rose	6 Ohio State	48	11 Utah	45	Rose Bowl	Pasadena, California
January 1, 2022	Sugar	7 Baylor	21	8 Ole Miss	7	Caesars Superdome	New Orleans, Louisiana

=== 2022 season ===
Date	Bowl	Winning team		Losing team		Stadium	Location
December 30, 2022	Orange	6 Tennessee	31	7 Clemson	14	Hard Rock Stadium	Miami Gardens, Florida
December 31, 2022	Sugar	5 Alabama	45	9 Kansas State	20	Caesars Superdome	New Orleans, Louisiana
December 31, 2022	Fiesta (CFP semifinal)	3 TCU	51	2 Michigan	45	State Farm Stadium	Glendale, Arizona
December 31, 2022	Peach (CFP semifinal)	1 Georgia	42	4 Ohio State	41	Mercedes-Benz Stadium	Atlanta, Georgia
January 2, 2023	Cotton	16 Tulane	46	10 USC	45	AT&T Stadium	Arlington, Texas
January 2, 2023	Rose	11 Penn State	35	8 Utah	21	Rose Bowl	Pasadena, California

=== 2023 season ===
Date	Bowl	Winning team		Losing team		Stadium	Location
December 29, 2023	Cotton	9 Missouri	14	7 Ohio State	3	AT&T Stadium	Arlington, Texas
December 30, 2023	Peach	11 Ole Miss	38	10 Penn State	25	Mercedes-Benz Stadium	Atlanta, Georgia
December 30, 2023	Orange	6 Georgia	63	5 Florida State	3	Hard Rock Stadium	Miami Gardens, Florida
January 1, 2024	Fiesta	8 Oregon	45	23 Liberty	6	State Farm Stadium	Glendale, Arizona
January 1, 2024	Rose (CFP semifinal)	1 Michigan	27^{OT}	4 Alabama	20	Rose Bowl	Pasadena, California
January 1, 2024	Sugar (CFP semifinal)	2 Washington	37	3 Texas	31	Caesars Superdome	New Orleans, Louisiana

=== 2024 season ===
Date	Bowl	Winning team		Losing team		Stadium	Location
December 31, 2024	Fiesta (CFP quarterfinal)	4 Penn State	31	9 Boise State	14	State Farm Stadium	Glendale, Arizona
January 1, 2025	Peach (CFP quarterfinal)	3 Texas	39^{2OT}	12 Arizona State	31	Mercedes-Benz Stadium	Atlanta, Georgia
January 1, 2025	Rose (CFP quarterfinal)	6 Ohio State	41	1 Oregon	21	Rose Bowl	Pasadena, California
January 2, 2025	Sugar (CFP quarterfinal)	5 Notre Dame	23	2 Georgia	10	Caesars Superdome	New Orleans, Louisiana
January 9, 2025	Orange (CFP semifinal)	5 Notre Dame	27	4 Penn State	24	Hard Rock Stadium	Miami Gardens, Florida
January 10, 2025	Cotton (CFP semifinal)	6 Ohio State	28	3 Texas	14	AT&T Stadium	Arlington, Texas

=== 2025 season ===
Date	Bowl	Winning team		Losing team		Stadium	Location
December 31, 2025	Cotton (CFP quarterfinal)	10 Miami (FL)	24	2 Ohio State	14	AT&T Stadium	Arlington, Texas
January 1, 2026	Orange (CFP quarterfinal)	5 Oregon	23	4 Texas Tech	0	Hard Rock Stadium	Miami Gardens, Florida
January 1, 2026	Rose (CFP quarterfinal)	1 Indiana	38	9 Alabama	3	Rose Bowl	Pasadena, California
January 1, 2026	Sugar (CFP quarterfinal)	6 Ole Miss	39	3 Georgia	34	Caesars Superdome	New Orleans, Louisiana
January 8, 2026	Fiesta (CFP semifinal)	10 Miami (FL)	31	6 Ole Miss	27	State Farm Stadium	Glendale, Arizona
January 9, 2026	Peach (CFP semifinal)	1 Indiana	56	5 Oregon	22	Mercedes-Benz Stadium	Atlanta, Georgia

=== 2026 season ===
Date	Bowl	Winning team	Losing team	Stadium	Location
December 30, 2026	Fiesta (CFP quarterfinal)			State Farm Stadium	Glendale, Arizona
January 1, 2027	Peach (CFP quarterfinal)			Mercedes-Benz Stadium	Atlanta, Georgia
January 1, 2027	Cotton (CFP quarterfinal)			AT&T Stadium	Arlington, Texas
January 1, 2027	Rose (CFP quarterfinal)			Rose Bowl	Pasadena, California
January 14, 2027	Orange (CFP semifinal)			Hard Rock Stadium	Miami Gardens, Florida
January 15, 2027	Sugar (CFP semifinal)			Caesars Superdome	New Orleans, Louisiana

== Appearances ==
=== Appearances by team ===
Key
College Football Playoff game

Team	Conf.	Apps.	W	L	%	Season	Rank	Result
Ohio State	Big Ten	12	8	5	.615	2014	4	W Sugar
Ohio State	Big Ten	12	8	5	.615	2015	7	W Fiesta
Ohio State	Big Ten	12	8	5	.615	2016	3	L Fiesta
Ohio State	Big Ten	12	8	5	.615	2017	5	W Cotton
Ohio State	Big Ten	12	8	5	.615	2018	6	W Rose
Ohio State	Big Ten	12	8	5	.615	2019	2	L Fiesta
Ohio State	Big Ten	12	8	5	.615	2020	3	W Sugar
Ohio State	Big Ten	12	8	5	.615	2021	6	W Rose
Ohio State	Big Ten	12	8	5	.615	2022	4	L Peach
Ohio State	Big Ten	12	8	5	.615	2023	7	L Cotton
Ohio State	Big Ten	12	8	5	.615	2024	6	W Rose
Ohio State	Big Ten	12	8	5	.615	2024	6	W Cotton
Ohio State	Big Ten	12	8	5	.615	2025	2	L Cotton
Alabama	SEC	10	7	3	.700	2014	1	L Sugar
Alabama	SEC	10	7	3	.700	2015	2	W Cotton
Alabama	SEC	10	7	3	.700	2016	1	W Peach
Alabama	SEC	10	7	3	.700	2017	4	W Sugar
Alabama	SEC	10	7	3	.700	2018	1	W Orange
Alabama	SEC	10	7	3	.700	2020	1	W Rose
Alabama	SEC	10	7	3	.700	2021	1	W Cotton
Alabama	SEC	10	7	3	.700	2022	5	W Sugar
Alabama	SEC	10	7	3	.700	2023	4	L Rose
Alabama	SEC	10	7	3	.700	2025	9	L Rose
Georgia	SEC	9	6	3	.667	2017	3	W Rose
Georgia	SEC	9	6	3	.667	2018	5	L Sugar
Georgia	SEC	9	6	3	.667	2019	5	W Sugar
Georgia	SEC	9	6	3	.667	2020	9	W Peach
Georgia	SEC	9	6	3	.667	2021	3	W Orange
Georgia	SEC	9	6	3	.667	2022	1	W Peach
Georgia	SEC	9	6	3	.667	2023	6	W Orange
Georgia	SEC	9	6	3	.667	2024	2	L Sugar
Georgia	SEC	9	6	3	.667	2025	3	L Sugar
Clemson	ACC	7	4	3	.571	2015	1	W Orange
Clemson	ACC	7	4	3	.571	2016	2	W Fiesta
Clemson	ACC	7	4	3	.571	2017	1	L Sugar
Clemson	ACC	7	4	3	.571	2018	2	W Cotton
Clemson	ACC	7	4	3	.571	2019	3	W Fiesta
Clemson	ACC	7	4	3	.571	2020	2	L Sugar
Clemson	ACC	7	4	3	.571	2022	7	L Orange
Oregon	Pac-12	6	4	3	.571	2014	2	W Rose
Oregon	Pac-12	6	4	3	.571	2019	6	W Rose
Oregon	Pac-12	6	4	3	.571	2020	25	L Fiesta
Oregon	Pac-12	6	4	3	.571	2023	8	W Fiesta
Oregon	Big Ten	6	4	3	.571	2024	1	L Rose
Oregon	Big Ten	6	4	3	.571	2025	5	W Orange
Oregon	Big Ten	6	4	3	.571	2025	5	L Peach
Penn State	Big Ten	6	4	3	.571	2016	5	L Rose
Penn State	Big Ten	6	4	3	.571	2017	9	W Fiesta
Penn State	Big Ten	6	4	3	.571	2019	10	W Cotton
Penn State	Big Ten	6	4	3	.571	2022	11	W Rose
Penn State	Big Ten	6	4	3	.571	2023	10	L Peach
Penn State	Big Ten	6	4	3	.571	2024	4	W Fiesta
Penn State	Big Ten	6	4	3	.571	2024	4	L Orange
Oklahoma	Big 12	6	2	4	.333	2015	4	L Orange
Oklahoma	Big 12	6	2	4	.333	2016	7	W Sugar
Oklahoma	Big 12	6	2	4	.333	2017	2	L Rose
Oklahoma	Big 12	6	2	4	.333	2018	4	L Orange
Oklahoma	Big 12	6	2	4	.333	2019	4	L Peach
Oklahoma	Big 12	6	2	4	.333	2020	6	W Cotton
Ole Miss	SEC	5	3	3	.500	2014	9	L Peach
Ole Miss	SEC	5	3	3	.500	2015	12	W Sugar
Ole Miss	SEC	5	3	3	.500	2021	8	L Sugar
Ole Miss	SEC	5	3	3	.500	2023	11	W Peach
Ole Miss	SEC	5	3	3	.500	2025	6	W Sugar
Ole Miss	SEC	5	3	3	.500	2025	6	L Fiesta
Notre Dame	Independent	5	2	4	.333	2015	8	L Fiesta
Notre Dame	Independent	5	2	4	.333	2018	3	L Cotton
Notre Dame	ACC	5	2	4	.333	2020	4	L Rose
Notre Dame	Independent	5	2	4	.333	2021	5	L Fiesta
Notre Dame	Independent	5	2	4	.333	2024	5	W Sugar
Notre Dame	Independent	5	2	4	.333	2024	5	W Orange
Michigan	Big Ten	5	1	4	.333	2016	6	L Orange
Michigan	Big Ten	5	1	4	.333	2018	7	L Peach
Michigan	Big Ten	5	1	4	.333	2021	2	L Orange
Michigan	Big Ten	5	1	4	.333	2022	2	L Fiesta
Michigan	Big Ten	5	1	4	.333	2023	1	W Rose
Florida State	ACC	4	1	3	.333	2014	3	L Rose
Florida State	ACC	4	1	3	.333	2015	9	L Peach
Florida State	ACC	4	1	3	.333	2016	11	W Orange
Florida State	ACC	4	1	3	.333	2023	5	L Orange
Washington	Pac-12	4	1	3	.333	2016	4	L Peach
Washington	Pac-12	4	1	3	.333	2017	11	L Fiesta
Washington	Pac-12	4	1	3	.333	2018	9	L Rose
Washington	Pac-12	4	1	3	.333	2023	2	W Sugar
Michigan State	Big Ten	3	2	1	.667	2014	8	W Cotton
Michigan State	Big Ten	3	2	1	.667	2015	3	L Cotton
Michigan State	Big Ten	3	2	1	.667	2021	10	W Peach
Wisconsin	Big Ten	3	2	1	.667	2016	8	W Cotton
Wisconsin	Big Ten	3	2	1	.667	2017	6	W Orange
Wisconsin	Big Ten	3	2	1	.667	2019	8	L Rose
Florida	SEC	3	2	1	.667	2018	10	W Peach
Florida	SEC	3	2	1	.667	2019	9	W Orange
Florida	SEC	3	2	1	.667	2020	7	L Cotton
USC	Pac-12	3	1	2	.333	2016	9	W Rose
USC	Pac-12	3	1	2	.333	2017	8	L Cotton
USC	Pac-12	3	1	2	.333	2022	10	L Cotton
Baylor	Big 12	3	1	2	.333	2014	5	L Cotton
Baylor	Big 12	3	1	2	.333	2019	7	L Sugar
Baylor	Big 12	3	1	2	.333	2021	7	W Sugar
Texas	Big 12	3	2	2	.500	2018	15	W Sugar
Texas	Big 12	3	2	2	.500	2023	3	L Sugar
Texas	SEC	3	2	2	.500	2024	3	W Peach
Texas	SEC	3	2	2	.500	2024	3	L Cotton
TCU	Big 12	2	2	0	1.000	2014	6	W Peach
TCU	Big 12	2	2	0	1.000	2022	3	W Fiesta
LSU	SEC	2	2	0	1.000	2018	11	W Fiesta
LSU	SEC	2	2	0	1.000	2019	1	W Peach
Miami (FL)	ACC	2	2	1	.667	2017	10	L Orange
Miami (FL)	ACC	2	2	1	.667	2025	10	W Cotton
Miami (FL)	ACC	2	2	1	.667	2025	10	W Fiesta
Boise State	MW	2	1	1	.500	2014	20	W Fiesta
Boise State	MW	2	1	1	.500	2024	9	L Fiesta
Oklahoma State	Big 12	2	1	1	.500	2015	16	L Sugar
Oklahoma State	Big 12	2	1	1	.500	2021	9	W Fiesta
UCF	AAC	2	1	1	.500	2017	12	W Peach
UCF	AAC	2	1	1	.500	2018	8	L Fiesta
Auburn	SEC	2	0	2	.000	2016	14	L Sugar
Auburn	SEC	2	0	2	.000	2017	7	L Peach
Cincinnati	AAC	2	0	2	.000	2020	8	L Peach
Cincinnati	AAC	2	0	2	.000	2021	4	L Cotton
Utah	Pac-12	2	0	2	.000	2021	11	L Rose
Utah	Pac-12	2	0	2	.000	2022	8	L Rose
Indiana	Big Ten	1	2	0	1.000	2025	1	W Rose
Indiana	Big Ten	1	2	0	1.000	2025	1	W Peach
Georgia Tech	ACC	1	1	0	1.000	2014	12	W Orange
Houston	AAC	1	1	0	1.000	2015	18	W Peach
Stanford	Pac-12	1	1	0	1.000	2015	6	W Rose
Iowa State	Big 12	1	1	0	1.000	2020	10	W Fiesta
Texas A&M	SEC	1	1	0	1.000	2020	5	W Orange
Tennessee	SEC	1	1	0	1.000	2022	6	W Orange
Tulane	AAC	1	1	0	1.000	2022	16	W Cotton
Missouri	SEC	1	1	0	1.000	2023	9	W Cotton
Arizona	Pac-12	1	0	1	.000	2014	10	L Fiesta
Mississippi State	SEC	1	0	1	.000	2014	7	L Orange
Iowa	Big Ten	1	0	1	.000	2015	5	L Rose
Western Michigan	MAC	1	0	1	.000	2016	15	L Cotton
Memphis	AAC	1	0	1	.000	2019	17	L Cotton
Virginia	ACC	1	0	1	.000	2019	24	L Orange
North Carolina	ACC	1	0	1	.000	2020	13	L Orange
Pittsburgh	ACC	1	0	1	.000	2021	12	L Peach
Kansas State	Big 12	1	0	1	.000	2022	9	L Sugar
Liberty	C-USA	1	0	1	.000	2023	23	L Fiesta
Arizona State	Big 12	1	0	1	.000	2024	12	L Peach
Texas Tech	Big 12	1	0	1	.000	2025	4	L Orange

=== Appearances by conference ===
Conf.	Apps.	G	W	L	%	Season											
Conf.	Apps.	G	W	L	%	2014	2015	2016	2017	2018	2019	2020	2021	2022	2023	2024	2025
SEC	36	38	24	14	.632	0–3	2–0	1–1	2–1	3–1	3–0	3–1	2–1	3–0	3–1	1–2	1–3
Big Ten	32	37	20	17	.541	2–0	1–2	1–3	3–0	1–1	1–2	1–0	2–1	1–2	1–2	3–2	3–2
ACC	19	20	8	11	.421	1–1	1–1	2–0	0–2	1–0	1–1	0–3	0–1	0–1	0–1	—	2–0
Big 12	18	19	8	11	.421	1–1	0–2	1–0	0–1	1–1	0–2	2–0	2–0	1–1	0–1	0–1	0–1
Pac-12	15	15	6	9	.400	0–1	1–0	1–1	0–2	0–1	1–0	0–1	0–1	0–2	2–0	—	—
American	7	7	3	4	.429	—	1–0	—	1–0	0–1	0–1	0–1	0–1	1–0	—	—	—
Independent	4	5	2	3	.400	—	0–1	—	—	0–1	—	—	0–1	—	—	2–0	—
MW	2	2	1	1	.500	1–0	—	—	—	—	—	—	—	—	—	0–1	—
MAC	1	1	0	1	.000	—	—	0–1	—	—	—	—	—	—	—	—	—
C-USA	1	1	0	1	.000	—	—	—	—	—	—	—	—	—	0–1	—	—

== See also ==
- List of college bowl games
- Bowl Championship Series
