= David Haugh =

American journalist

David Haugh (born May 22, 1968) is an American columnist, radio, and television personality. Haugh wrote for the Chicago Tribune from 2002 to 2020, serving as the primary Chicago Bears columnist since 2009.

In July 2018, Haugh replaced Brian Hanley as the host of the Mully & Hanley morning show on WSCR. He joined retained host Mike Mulligan on the newly branded Mully & Haugh show. In August 2026, Mulligan was fired and replaced by former Tennessee Titans running back Jarrett Payton, the son of Chicago Bears Hall of Famer Walter Payton.

== Education ==
Haugh was raised in North Judson, Indiana. He obtained his degree from Ball State University, where he played football and was an All-Mid-American Conference safety and Academic All-American. He later received his master's degree from the Medill School of Journalism at Northwestern University.

== Career ==
Haugh worked for the South Bend Tribune starting in 1993, primarily covering Notre Dame football. In February 2003, Haugh began working for the Chicago Tribune. He began as the beat writer and later columnist for the Chicago Bears. In 2009, he became the Chicago Tribune's 17th "In the Wake of the News" columnist. On January 28, 2020, Haugh was fired from the Chicago Tribune after 17 years with the newspaper.

Haugh was also the co-host of the now-defunct "Kap and Haugh Show," which aired on Comcast SportsNet Chicago and WGN Plus. He partnered with longtime Chicago sports broadcaster David Kaplan on the program from 9 am-noon on weekdays. Haugh was also a regular postgame contributor on SportsTalk Live on NBC Sports Chicago following Bears games. After the show's cancellation, he became a regular host of Football Night in Chicago. Haugh is now the morning drive time host of Haugh and Payton on 104.3 FM The Score with Jarrett Payton from 5:30 to 10 a.m. during weekdays.

== Awards and honors ==
Haugh has received several locals, state, and national writing awards. He was chosen as the 1999 Indiana Sportswriter of the Year by the National Sportscasters and Sportswriters Association.

== Family ==
His wife Allison filed for divorce in Illinois, March 2026. Together they have a son and two dogs.
