= Jarrett Payton =

American football player and sports broadcaster (born 1980)

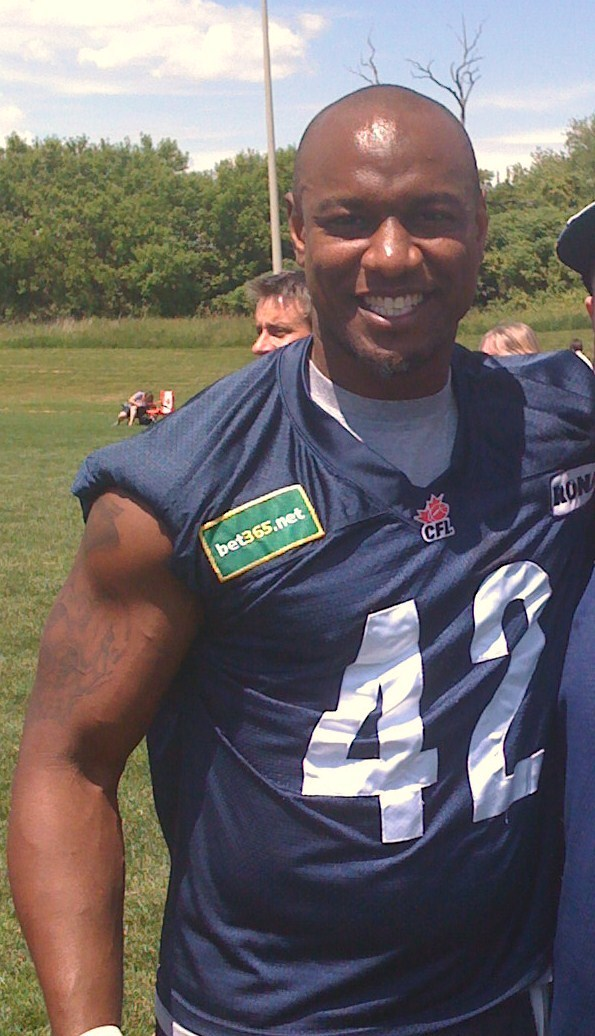
- Payton with the Toronto Argonauts in 2009

No. 33, 42
- Position: Running back

Personal information
- Born: December 26, 1980 (age 45); Arlington Heights, Illinois, U.S.
- Listed height: 6 ft 0 in (1.83 m)
- Listed weight: 220 lb (100 kg)

Career information
- High school: Saint Viator (Arlington Heights)
- College: Miami (FL)
- NFL draft: 2004: undrafted

Career history
- Tennessee Titans (2004–2005); → Amsterdam Admirals (2005); Montreal Alouettes (2007); Toronto Argonauts (2009); Chicago Slaughter (2010)

Awards and highlights
- World Bowl champion (XIII); All-NFL Europe League (2005); National champion (2001); Orange Bowl champion (2004); Orange Bowl MVP (2004)

Career NFL statistics
- Rushing yards: 105
- Yards per carry: 3.2
- Rushing touchdowns: 2
- Stats at Pro Football Reference

Jarrett Walter Payton (born December 26, 1980) is an American former professional football player who was a running back in the National Football League (NFL) and Canadian Football League (CFL). He is the son of Walter Payton. After playing college football for the Miami Hurricanes, Payton signed as an undrafted free agent with the NFL's Tennessee Titans. He also played for the Amsterdam Admirals, Montreal Alouettes and Toronto Argonauts. Payton co-hosts mornings at WSCR in Chicago and hosts The Jarrett Payton Show on ChicagolandSportsRadio.com. He also anchored for WGN-TV in Chicago.

== Early life ==
Payton played high school soccer and football at St. Viator High School. In his first two years of high school, he opted for soccer and earned All-State player honors. As a senior in high school Payton accounted for 2,842 all-purpose yards while playing quarterback, tailback, and wide receiver (passed for 1,088 yards and rushed for another 1,345 yards). He was rated the No. 58 overall prospect in the nation by The Sporting News and named the No. 5 athlete in the Midwest Region by PrepStar.

== College career ==
As a freshman at the University of Miami, Payton saw action in several games. He finished his freshman year with 262 yards rushing on 53 carries for a 4.9 average. He also totaled six catches for 48 yards (8.0 average) and returned two kickoffs for 44 yards. As a sophomore in college Payton sat out the season with a redshirt year (not medically related). As a third-year sophomore, moving to fullback from tailback, Payton played in eight games during the regular season and gained 26 yards on 14 carries with two touchdowns. In 2002, as a fourth year junior, he played extensively at tailback and as a starting kickoff return man (averaged 20.7 yards per kickoff return). At tailback he rushed for 223 yards on 50 carries (4.5 average). In his final year at the University of Miami Payton ran for 985 yards and seven touchdowns on 182 carries (5.4 average). He also caught 17 passes for 136 yards and one touchdown (8.0 average). He was also named the MVP of the 2004 Orange Bowl.

== Professional career ==
=== National Football League ===
Pre-draft measurables
Height	Weight	Arm length	Hand span	40-yard dash	10-yard split	20-yard split	20-yard shuttle	Three-cone drill	Vertical jump	Broad jump
6 ft 0 1/8 in (1.83 m)	220 lb (100 kg)	30 3/4 in (0.78 m)	8 7/8 in (0.23 m)	4.64 s	1.66 s	2.76 s	4.31 s	7.34 s	31.0 in (0.79 m)	9 ft 7 in (2.92 m)
All values from NFL Combine

In 2004, Payton joined the Tennessee Titans in free agency and spent that year on their practice squad. The Titans head coach, Jeff Fisher, was one of his father's former teammates on the Bears. In 2005, Payton was sent to NFL Europe, where he played for the Amsterdam Admirals. He averaged 5.6 yards-per-carry, ranking second in the league, and tied for the most touchdowns with seven. He was a major part of the Admirals victory that year in the World Bowl XIII. He was also a member of the All-NFL Europe League team in 2005. Payton re-joined the Titans the 2005 NFL season and made his NFL debut on October 2 in a 31–10 loss to the Indianapolis Colts. He finished the season with 33 carries for 105 yards and 2 touchdowns.

Payton was released prior to the 2006 season by the Titans during final cuts.

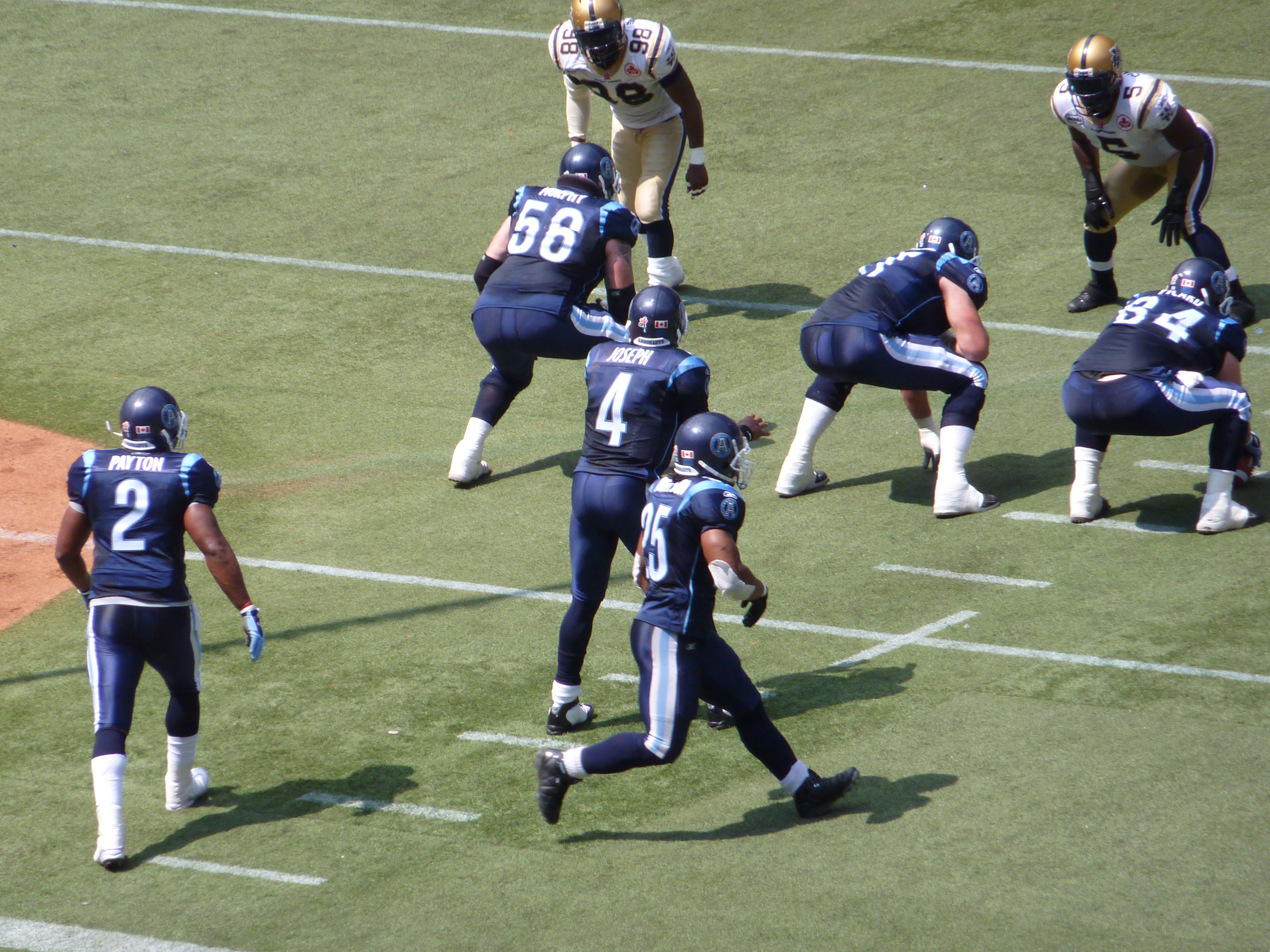
Payton (#2) in 2009.

=== Canadian Football League ===
On February 22, 2007 it was announced that Payton had signed a one-year contract with the Montreal Alouettes of the CFL. He scored his first career CFL touchdown on August 2, 2007, against Toronto. Jarrett's first 100-yard rushing game came on August 9, 2007, when he rushed the ball 20 times for 160 yards and one touchdown against the Calgary Stampeders. Payton finished the season fifth in the CFL with 852 yards and fourth with eight rushing touchdowns. Payton was released by the Alouettes on July 2, 2008.

Payton signed with the Toronto Argonauts on June 7, 2009. He was released by the Argonauts, at his request, on September 9, 2009. During his time with the Argos he gained 47 all-purpose yards on three catches and seven carries. In 2010, He finished up his professional playing career with the Chicago Slaughter of the Indoor Football League. He announced that his desire was to continue work with the Chicago-based Walter & Connie Payton Foundation, which helps underprivileged children.

== Broadcast career ==
On May 8, 2015, Payton was hired as a sports reporter by WGN-TV, which included a role as a host of a show on Chicagoland Television. As of 2025, Payton's role at WGN included being a sports anchor/reporter for WGN News and co-anchor of WGN's GN Sports Payton announced on July 30, 2026, that he was leaving WGN to spend more time with family.

On September 24, 2023, while covering the Chicago Bears' game against the Kansas City Chiefs at Arrowhead Stadium for WGN, Payton recorded the first publicly released video of Taylor Swift and Travis Kelce together, capturing the pair leaving the stadium side by side following the game. The four-second clip, which Payton posted to X, was widely regarded as the first visual confirmation of the couple's then-rumored relationship and went viral, amassing more than 15 million views within 24 hours. Payton later said stadium security had asked him to delete the footage, which he declined to do.

In August 2026, Payton replaced Mike "Mully" Mulligan as morning co-host with David Haugh on sports-talk "104.3 The Score" WSCR in Chicago.

== Personal life ==
Payton is the son of Walter Payton, the former Chicago Bears running back. He grew up in Arlington Heights, Illinois and South Barrington, Illinois, and has a sister, Brittney. In 1993, 12-year-old Jarrett gave the induction speech at his father's induction to the Pro Football Hall of Fame. In 2024, he would induct his father's former Bears teammate Steve McMichael into the NFL Hall of Fame as well.

He wore jerseys numbered 33, 4 (Titans), and 34 (Miami). Payton chose 33 when he played with the Titans because his father's number, 34, was retired in honor of Earl Campbell.

Apart from playing football, Payton spends his time recording music.

He married the former Trisha George on March 4, 2009, in Florida. The wedding date was intentionally set on this date to coincide with Walter Payton's famous jersey number, 34. They held their reception at Soldier Field in Chicago 3 days later, March 7. The couple has two children, son Jaden and daughter Madison.

In 2011, Payton formed the Jarrett Payton Foundation. The Jarrett Payton Foundation strives to positively influence young people in and around Chicago through two core programs: the youth football camp The Jarrett Payton Leadership Academy, and the anti-bullying program PROJECT: NO BULL.
