= Tanard Davis =

American football player (born 1983)

No. 23
- Position: Cornerback

Personal information
- Born: January 27, 1983 (age 43); Miami, Florida, U.S.
- Listed height: 5 ft 9 in (1.75 m)
- Listed weight: 184 lb (83 kg)

Career information
- College: Miami (FL)
- NFL draft: 2006: undrafted

Career history
- Indianapolis Colts (2006–2007)*; Carolina Panthers (2007)*; Philadelphia Eagles (2007); St. Louis Rams (2008)*; New Orleans Saints (2008)*; Tennessee Titans (2008–2009)*; Montreal Alouettes (2010)
- * Offseason or practice squad member only

Awards and highlights
- Super Bowl champion (XLI)

Tanard Davis (born January 27, 1983) is an American former professional football cornerback. He was signed by the Indianapolis Colts as an undrafted free agent in 2006. He played college football at the University of Miami.

Davis earned a Super Bowl ring as a member of the Colts' practice squad during Super Bowl XLI. He was also a member of the Carolina Panthers, Philadelphia Eagles, St. Louis Rams, New Orleans Saints, Tennessee Titans, and Montreal Alouettes. He later became a pro Jai Alai player.
