= 2021 Orange Bowl =

The 2021 Orange Bowl may refer to:

- 2021 Orange Bowl (January) – a bowl game following the 2020 season, on January 2, 2021, between Texas A&M and North Carolina
- 2021 Orange Bowl (December) – a bowl game following the 2021 season, on December 31, 2021, between Georgia and Michigan
