= 2021 Orange Bowl (January) =

Postseason college football bowl game

2021 Capital One Orange Bowl
- CFP New Year's Six; 87th Orange Bowl
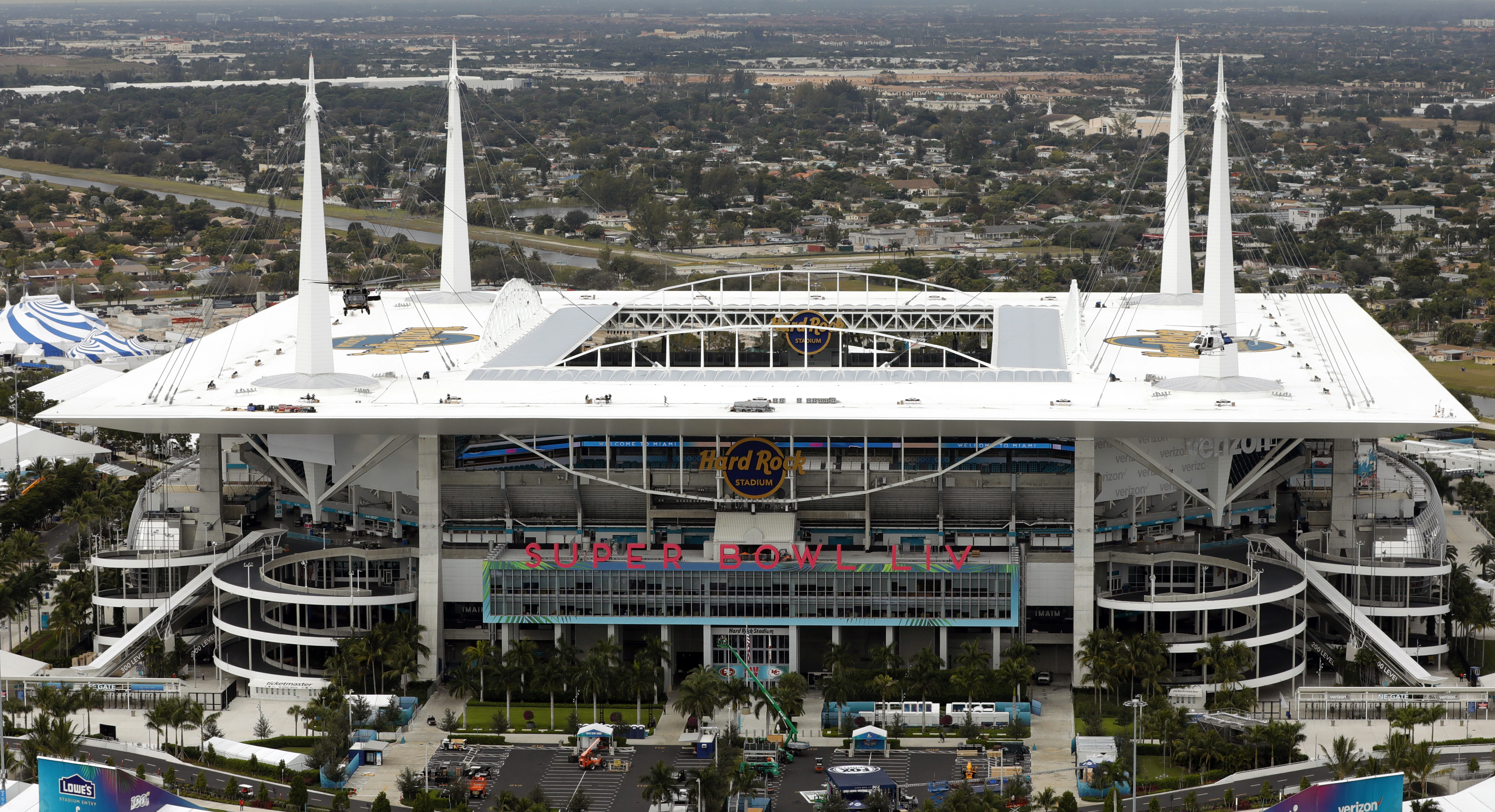
- Hard Rock Stadium in Miami Gardens, Florida, hosted the Orange Bowl.
Texas A&M Aggies	North Carolina Tar Heels
(8–1)	(8–3)
SEC	ACC
41	27
Head coach: Jimbo Fisher	Head coach: Mack Brown
AP / Coaches / CFP; 5 / 5 / 5	AP / Coaches / CFP; 14 / 14 / 13
	1	2	3	4	Total
Texas A&M	7	10	0	24	41
North Carolina	3	10	7	7	27
- Date: January 2, 2021
- Season: 2020
- Stadium: Hard Rock Stadium
- Location: Miami Gardens, Florida
- MVP: De’Von Achane (RB, Texas A&M)
- Favorite: Texas A&M by 6
- National anthem: Reina Obzay
- Referee: Larry Smith (Big Ten)
- Attendance: 13,737

United States TV coverage
- Network: ESPN and ESPN Radio
- Announcers: ESPN: Bob Wischusen (play-by-play); Dan Orlovsky (analyst); Katie George (sideline); ESPN Radio: Sean Kelley and Barrett Jones

The 2021 Orange Bowl was a college football bowl game played on January 2, 2021, with kickoff scheduled for 8:00 p.m. EST on ESPN. It was the 87th edition of the Orange Bowl, and was one of the 2020–21 bowl games concluding the 2020 FBS football season. Sponsored by bank holding company Capital One, the game was officially known as the Capital One Orange Bowl.

== Teams ==
As one of the New Year's Six bowl games, the participants of the game were determined by the College Football Playoff selection committee. The committee matched No. 5 (Note: Per final CFP Rankings released on December 20.) Texas A&M of the Southeastern Conference (SEC) against No. 13 North Carolina of the Atlantic Coast Conference (ACC). The programs had not previously met.

=== Texas A&M Aggies ===
Texas A&M entered the bowl with an 8–1 record, all in SEC games. Their only loss of the season was to Alabama, a 52–24 defeat. The Aggies defeated one ranked team during the season, Florida, by a score of 41–38. Texas A&M had appeared in one previous Orange Bowl, the 1944 edition.

=== North Carolina Tar Heels ===
North Carolina entered the bowl with an 8–3 record, 7–3 in ACC play. The Tar Heels' losses were to Florida State, Virginia, and ranked Notre Dame. North Carolina defeated three ranked teams during the season: Virginia Tech, NC State, and Miami (FL). This was the first appearance by the Tar Heels in an Orange Bowl.

== Game summary ==
2021 Capital One Orange Bowl

Quarter	1	2	3	4	Total
No. 5 Aggies	7	10	0	24	41
No. 13 Tar Heels	3	10	7	7	27

at Hard Rock Stadium • Miami Gardens, Florida

- Date: Saturday, January 2, 2021
- Game time: 8:00 p.m. EST
- Referee: Larry Smith
- TV announcers (ESPN): Bob Wischusen (play-by-play), Dan Orlovsky (analyst), and Katie George (sideline)
- ESPN game summary

Game information

First quarter

- (9:11) TAMU — Isaiah Spiller 9 yard rush, Seth Small kick (Drive: 7 plays, 28 yards, 3:31; Texas A&M 7–0)
- (4:31) UNC — Grayson Atkins 29 yard field goal (Drive: 11 plays, 63 yards, 4:40; Texas A&M 7–3)

Second quarter

- (11:09) UNC — Grayson Atkins 32 yard field goal (Drive: 11 plays, 36 yards, 5:48; Texas A&M 7–6)
- (7:40) TAMU — Seth Small 25 yard field goal (Drive: 7 plays, 68 yards, 3:29; Texas A&M 10–6)
- (4:56) UNC — Dazz Newsome 28 yard pass from Sam Howell, Grayson Atkins kick (Drive: 8 plays, 75 yards, 2:44; North Carolina 13–10)
- (0:20) TAMU — Isaiah Spiller 3 yard rush, Seth Small kick (Drive: 8 plays, 75 yards, 4:36; Texas A&M 17–13)

Third quarter

- (8:01) UNC — Josh Downs 10 yard pass from Sam Howell, Grayson Atkins kick (Drive: 9 plays, 66 yards, 3:25; North Carolina 20–17)

Fourth quarter

- (14:02) TAMU — Seth Small 23 yard field goal (Drive: 12 plays, 74 yards, 5:31; Tied 20–20)
- (13:51) UNC — Josh Downs 75 yard pass from Sam Howell, Grayson Atkins kick (Drive: 1 plays, 75 yards, 0:11; North Carolina 27–20)
- (10:11) TAMU — Kellen Mond 4 yard rush, Seth Small kick (Drive: 7 plays, 75 yards, 3:40; Tied 27–27)
- (3:44) TAMU — De’Von Achane 76 yard rush, Seth Small kick (Drive: 3 plays, 87 yards, 1:23; Texas A&M 34–27)
- (1:34) TAMU — De’Von Achane 1 yard rush, Seth Small kick (Drive: 3 plays, 34 yards, 0:50; Texas A&M 41–27)

=== Statistics ===
Statistics	TAMU	UNC
First downs	19	18
Plays–yards	61–457	65–324
Rushes–yards	35–225	34–90
Passing yards	232	234
Passing: comp–att–int	16–26–0	18–31–1
Time of possession	32:13	27:47

Team	Category	Player	Statistics
Texas A&M	Passing	Kellen Mond	16-for-26, 232 yards
Texas A&M	Rushing	De’Von Achane	140 yards on 12 carries, 2 TD
Texas A&M	Receiving	Ainias Smith	125 yards on 6 receptions
North Carolina	Passing	Sam Howell	18-for-31, 234 yards, 3 TD, 1 INT
North Carolina	Rushing	British Brooks	53 yards on 15 carries
North Carolina	Receiving	Josh Downs	91 yards on 4 receptions, 2 TD

== See also ==
- 2021 College Football Playoff National Championship, played at the same venue nine days later
