= Ryan Moore (American football) =

American football player (born 1983)

No. 1
- Position: Wide receiver

Personal information
- Born: December 8, 1983 (age 42); Orlando, Florida
- Listed height: 6 ft 3 in (1.91 m)
- Listed weight: 225 lb (102 kg)

Career information
- High school: Orlando (FL) Phillips
- College: Miami (FL)
- NFL draft: 2010: undrafted

Career history
- Jacksonville Sharks (2010)*; Allen Wranglers (2012); Nebraska Danger (2012)
- * Offseason or practice squad member only
- Stats at ArenaFan.com

Ryan Moore (born December 8, 1983) is an American former football wide receiver. Moore played high school football at Dr. Phillips High School. He played wide receiver for Miami. He was signed as a free agent by the Jacksonville Sharks.
