= Missouri Tigers football statistical leaders =

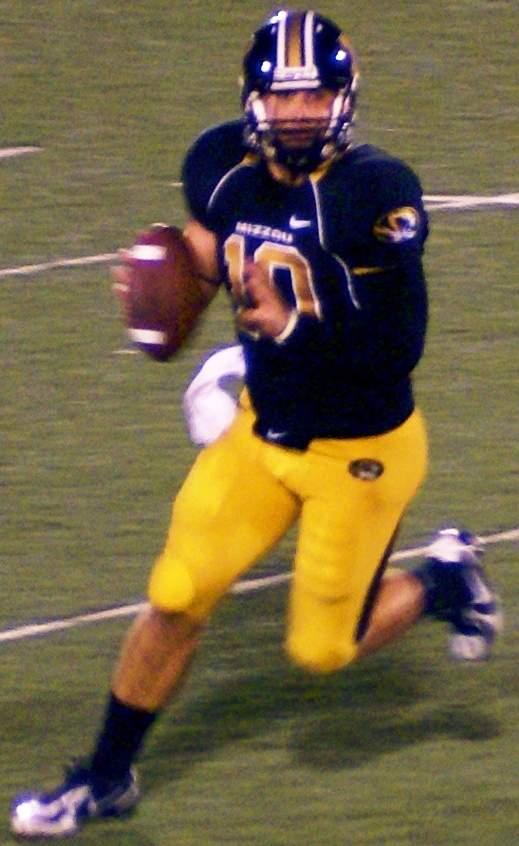
Chase Daniel is Missouri's career leader in passing yards.

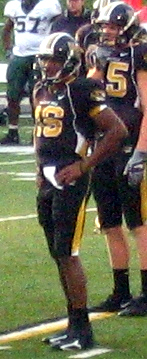
Brad Smith is Missouri's career leader in rushing yards and is third in passing yards.

The Missouri Tigers football statistical leaders are individual statistical leaders of the Missouri Tigers football program in various categories, including passing, rushing, receiving, total offense, defensive stats, and kicking. Within those areas, the lists identify single-game, single-season and career leaders. The Tigers represent the University of Missouri in the NCAA's Southeastern Conference (SEC).

Although Missouri began competing in intercollegiate football in 1890, the school's official record book considers the "modern era" to have begun in 1938. Records from before this year are often incomplete and inconsistent, and they are generally not included in these lists.

These lists are dominated by more recent players for several reasons:

- Since the 1930s, seasons have increased from 9 games to 10, 11, and then 12 games in length.
- Since 1996, Missouri has had the opportunity to play in a conference championship game (except in 2011), adding a potential extra game to the season. Missouri reached a conference championship game in 2007 and 2008 as a member of the Big 12 Conference, and 2013 and 2014 in the SEC.
- Bowl games only began counting toward single-season and career statistics in 2002.

These statistics are updated through Week 12 of the 2026 season. The Missouri Football Record Book sometimes only lists a leader in certain statistics, rather than a top 10.

== Passing ==
=== Passing yards ===
Career
Rank	Player	Yards	Years
1	Chase Daniel	12,515	2005 2006 2007 2008
2	Drew Lock	12,193	2015 2016 2017 2018
3	Brady Cook	9,008	2020 2021 2022 2023 2024
4	Brad Smith	8,799	2002 2003 2004 2005
5	James Franklin	6,962	2010 2011 2012 2013
6	Jeff Handy	6,959	1991 1992 1993 1994
7	Blaine Gabbert	6,822	2008 2009 2010
8	Phil Bradley	5,352	1977 1978 1979 1980
9	Marlon Adler	5,231	1982 1983 1984 1985
10	Connor Bazelak	5,058	2019 2020 2021

Single season
Rank	Player	Yards	Year
1	Chase Daniel	4,335	2008
2	Chase Daniel	4,306	2007
3	Drew Lock	3,964	2017
4	Blaine Gabbert	3,593	2009
5	Chase Daniel	3,527	2006
6	Drew Lock	3,498	2018
7	Drew Lock	3,399	2016
8	Brady Cook	3,317	2023
9	Blaine Gabbert	3,186	2010
10	James Franklin	2,865	2011

Single game
Rank	Player	Yards	Year	Opponent
1	Drew Lock	521	2017	Missouri State
2	Jeff Handy	480	1992	Oklahoma State
3	Blaine Gabbert	468	2009	Baylor
4	Drew Lock	467	2017	Idaho
5	Drew Lock	450	2016	Eastern Michigan
6	Drew Lock	448	2017	Arkansas
7	Kent Kiefer	444	1989	Kansas
8	Chase Daniel	439	2008	Buffalo
9	Blaine Gabbert	434	2010	Iowa (Insight Bowl)
10	Jeff Handy	424	1992	Nebraska

=== Passing touchdowns ===
Career
Rank	Player	TDs	Years
1	Chase Daniel	101	2005 2006 2007 2008
2	Drew Lock	99	2015 2016 2017 2018
3	Brad Smith	56	2002 2003 2004 2005
4	James Franklin	51	2010 2011 2012 2013
5	Brady Cook	49	2020 2021 2022 2023 2024
6	Maty Mauk	42	2013 2014 2015
7	Blaine Gabbert	40	2008 2009 2010
8	Jeff Handy	39	1991 1992 1993 1994
9	Phil Bradley	32	1977 1978 1979 1980
	Marlon Adler	32	1982 1983 1984 1985

Single season
Rank	Player	TDs	Year
1	Drew Lock	44	2017
2	Chase Daniel	39	2008
3	Chase Daniel	33	2007
4	Chase Daniel	28	2006
	Drew Lock	28	2018
6	Maty Mauk	25	2014
	Austin Simmons	25	2026
8	Blaine Gabbert	24	2009
9	Drew Lock	23	2016
10	James Franklin	21	2011
	Brady Cook	21	2023

Single game
Rank	Player	TDs	Year	Opponent
1	Drew Lock	7	2017	Missouri State
2	Drew Lock	6	2017	Idaho
3	Chase Daniel	5	2006	Murray State
	Chase Daniel	5	2007	Ole Miss
	Chase Daniel	5	2007	Colorado
	Chase Daniel	5	2008	Colorado
	Maty Mauk	5	2014	Toledo
	Drew Lock	5	2016	Eastern Michigan
	Drew Lock	5	2016	Delaware State
	Drew Lock	5	2017	Connecticut
	Drew Lock	5	2017	Arkansas

== Rushing ==
=== Rushing yards ===
Career
Rank	Player	Yards	Years
1	Brad Smith	4,289	2002 2003 2004 2005
2	Larry Rountree III	3,720	2017 2018 2019 2020
3	Zack Abron	3,198	2000 2001 2002 2003
4	Brock Olivo	3,026	1994 1995 1996 1997
5	Devin West	2,954	1995 1996 1997 1998
6	Henry Josey	2,771	2010 2011 2013
7	Tyler Badie	2,740	2018 2019 2020 2021
8	Darrell Wallace	2,607	1984 1985 1986 1987
9	Tony Temple	2,552	2004 2005 2006 2007
10	Corby Jones	2,533	1995 1996 1997 1998

Single season
Rank	Player	Yards	Year
1	Ahmad Hardy	1,649	2025
2	Cody Schrader	1,627	2023
3	Tyler Badie	1,604	2021
4	Devin West	1,578	1998
5	Brad Smith	1,406	2003
6	Joe Moore	1,312	1969
7	Brad Smith	1,301	2005
8	Larry Rountree III	1,216	2018
9	Jamal Roberts	1,200	2026
10	Henry Josey	1,168	2011

Single game
Rank	Player	Yards	Year	Opponent
1	Devin West	319	1998	Kansas
2	Ahmad Hardy	300	2025	Mississippi State
3	Brad Smith	291	2003	Texas Tech
4	Tony Temple	281	2007	Arkansas
5	Henry Josey	263	2011	Western Illinois
6	Tyler Badie	254	2021	Vanderbilt
7	Devin West	252	1998	Iowa State
8	Ahmad Hardy	250	2025	Louisiana
9	Brad Smith	246	2005	Nebraska
10	Harry Ice	240	1941	Kansas

=== Rushing touchdowns ===
Career
Rank	Player	TDs	Years
1	Brad Smith	45	2002 2003 2004 2005
2	Larry Rountree III	40	2017 2018 2019 2020
3	Zack Abron	40	2000 2001 2002 2003
4	Corby Jones	38	1995 1996 1997 1998
5	Henry Josey	30	2010 2011 2013
6	Devin West	28	1995 1996 1997 1998
	Derrick Washington	28	2007 2008 2009
8	Brock Olivo	27	1994 1995 1996 1997
9	Tyler Badie	23	2018 2019 2020 2021
	Cody Schrader	23	2022 2023

Single season
Rank	Player	TDs	Year
1	Brad Smith	18	2003
2	Devin West	17	1998
	Derrick Washington	17	2008
4	Brad Smith	16	2005
	Henry Josey	16	2013
	Ahmad Hardy	16	2025
7	Zack Abron	15	2002
	James Franklin	15	2011
9	Larry Rountree	14	2020
	Zack Abron	14	2003
	Corby Jones	14	1997
	Tyler Badie	14	2021
	Cody Schrader	14	2023

Single game
Rank	Player	TDs	Year	Opponent
1	Brad Smith	5	2003	Texas Tech
2	Damarea Crockett	4	2016	Middle Tennessee

== Receiving ==
=== Receptions ===
Career
Rank	Player	Rec	Years
1	Chase Coffman	247	2005 2006 2007 2008
2	Martin Rucker	203	2004 2005 2006 2007
3	Justin Gage	200	1999 2000 2001 2002
4	Luther Burden III	192	2022 2023 2024
5	Danario Alexander	191	2006 2007 2008 2009
6	T.J. Moe	188	2009 2010 2011 2012
7	Jeremy Maclin	182	2007 2008
8	J'Mon Moore	158	2014 2015 2016 2017
9	Kenny Holly	151	1990 1991 1992 1993
10	Tommy Saunders	150	2005 2006 2007 2008

Single season
Rank	Player	Rec	Year
1	Danario Alexander	113	2009
2	Jeremy Maclin	102	2008
3	T.J. Moe	92	2010
4	Chase Coffman	90	2008
	Michael Egnew	90	2010
6	Luther Burden III	86	2023
7	Martin Rucker	84	2007
8	Justin Gage	82	2002
9	Jeremy Maclin	80	2007
10	Bud Sasser	77	2014

Single game
Rank	Player	Rec	Year	Opponent
1	Justin Gage	16	2002	Bowling Green
2	Kenny Holly	15	1992	Oklahoma State
	Danario Alexander	15	2009	Kansas
	T.J. Moe	15	2010	Iowa
5	Jeremy Maclin	14	2008	Buffalo
6	Justin Gage	13	2001	Baylor
	Danario Alexander	13	2009	Baylor
	Michael Egnew	13	2010	San Diego State
	T.J. Moe	13	2010	Illinois
	Theo Wease Jr.	13	2024	Buffalo

=== Receiving yards ===
Career
Rank	Player	Yards	Years
1	Danario Alexander	2,778	2006 2007 2008 2009
2	Justin Gage	2,704	1999 2000 2001 2002
3	Chase Coffman	2,659	2005 2006 2007 2008
4	J'Mon Moore	2,477	2014 2015 2016 2017
5	Jeremy Maclin	2,315	2007 2008
6	Luther Burden III	2,263	2022 2023 2024
7	Martin Rucker	2,175	2004 2005 2006 2007
8	Victor Bailey	2,144	1990 1991 1992
9	William Franklin	2,125	2004 2005 2006 2007
10	T.J. Moe	2,101	2009 2010 2011 2012

Single season
Rank	Player	Yards	Year
1	Danario Alexander	1,781	2009
2	Jeremy Maclin	1,260	2008
3	Luther Burden III	1,212	2023
4	Victor Bailey	1,210	1992
5	Justin Gage	1,075	2002
6	Jeremy Maclin	1,055	2007
7	T.J. Moe	1,045	2010
8	J'Mon Moore	1,082	2017
9	J'Mon Moore	1,012	2016
10	Bud Sasser	1,003	2014

Single game
Rank	Player	Yards	Year	Opponent
1	Justin Gage	236	2001	Bowling Green
	Justin Gage	236	2002	Bowling Green
3	Danario Alexander	233	2009	Kansas
4	Linzy Collins	229	1990	Kansas
5	Danario Alexander	214	2009	Baylor
6	Henry Marshall	207	1975	Oklahoma State
7	Danario Alexander	200	2009	Kansas State
8	Henry Marshall	199	1975	Oklahoma
9	J'Mon Moore	196	2016	Georgia
10	Linzy Collins	193	1989	Kansas

=== Receiving touchdowns ===
Career
Rank	Player	TDs	Years
1	Chase Coffman	30	2005 2006 2007 2008
2	Albert Okwuegbunam	23	2017 2018 2019
3	Danario Alexander	22	2006 2007 2008 2009
	Jeremy Maclin	22	2007 2008
5	J'Mon Moore	21	2014 2015 2016 2017
	Luther Burden III	21	2022 2023 2024
7	Justin Gage	18	1999 2000 2001 2002
	Martin Rucker	18	2004 2005 2006 2007
9	Dorial Green-Beckham	17	2012 2013
10	L'Damian Washington	15	2010 2011 2012 2013

Single season
Rank	Player	TDs	Year
1	Danario Alexander	14	2009
2	Jeremy Maclin	13	2008
3	Bud Sasser	12	2014
	Dorial Green-Beckham	12	2013
5	Albert Okwuegbunam	11	2017
6	J'Mon Moore	10	2017
	Chase Coffman	10	2008
	L'Damian Washington	10	2013
	Sean Coffey	10	2004
	Donovan Olugbode	10	2026

Single game
Rank	Player	TDs	Year	Opponent
1	Dorial Green-Beckham	4	2013	Kentucky
	J'Mon Moore	4	2016	Delaware State
3	Victor Bailey	3	1991	Kansas
	Dwayne Blakley	3	1999	Western Michigan
	Chase Coffman	3	2007	Colorado
	Jeremy Maclin	3	2008	Nevada
	Danario Alexander	3	2009	Kansas State

== Total offense ==
Total offense is the sum of passing and rushing statistics. It does not include receiving or returns.

=== Total offense yards ===
Career
Rank	Player	Yards	Years
1	Chase Daniel	13,485	2005 2006 2007 2008
2	Brad Smith	13,088	2002 2003 2004 2005
3	Brady Cook	10,217	2020 2021 2022 2023 2024
4	Drew Lock	9,700	2015 2016 2017 2018
5	James Franklin	8,691	2010 2011 2012 2013
6	Blaine Gabbert	7,280	2008 2009 2010
7	Jeff Handy	6,640	1991 1992 1993 1994
8	Phil Bradley	6,459	1977 1978 1979 1980
9	Corby Jones	6,230	1995 1996 1997 1998
10	Marlon Adler	5,965	1982 1983 1984 1985

Single season
Rank	Player	Yards	Year
1	Chase Daniel	4,616	2008
2	Chase Daniel	4,559	2007
3	Drew Lock	4,075	2017
4	Chase Daniel	3,906	2006
5	James Franklin	3,846	2011
6	Blaine Gabbert	3,797	2009
7	Brady Cook	3,636	2023
8	Brad Smith	3,605	2005
9	Drew Lock	3,522	2016
10	Blaine Gabbert	3,418	2010

Single game
Rank	Player	Yards	Year	Opponent
1	Drew Lock	515	2017	Missouri State
2	Brad Smith	480	2005	Nebraska
3	Drew Lock	474	2017	Arkansas
4	Chase Daniel	473	2007	Nebraska
5	Jeff Handy	471	1992	Oklahoma State
6	Drew Lock	465	2017	Idaho
7	Chase Daniel	455	2008	Buffalo
8	Drew Lock	451	2016	Eastern Michigan
9	Drew Lock	449	2018	Wyoming
10	Chase Daniel	445	2007	Colorado

=== Touchdowns responsible for ===
"Touchdowns responsible for" is the NCAA's official term for combined passing and rushing touchdowns.

Career
Rank	Player	TDs	Years
1	Chase Daniel	111	2005 2006 2007 2008
2	Brad Smith	101	2002 2003 2004 2005
3	Drew Lock	84	2015 2016 2017 2018
4	James Franklin	72	2010 2011 2012 2013
5	Brady Cook	69	2020 2021 2022 2023 2024
6	Corby Jones	64	1995 1996 1997 1998
7	Marlon Adler	53	1982 1983 1984 1985
8	Phil Bradley	48	1977 1978 1979 1980
	Blaine Gabbert	48	2008 2009 2010
10	Maty Mauk	46	2013 2014 2015

Single season
Rank	Player	TDs	Year
1	Drew Lock	44	2017
2	Chase Daniel	40	2008

Single game
Rank	Player	TDs	Year	Opponent
1	Drew Lock	7	2017	Missouri State
2	Maty Mauk	6	2014	Toledo

== Defense ==
=== Interceptions ===
Career
Rank	Player	Ints	Years
1	Adrian Jones	15	1986 1987 1988 1989
2	Ken Boston	14	1963 1964 1965
	Bill Whitaker	14	1977 1979 1979 1980
4	Erik McMillan	13	1984 1985 1986 1987
5	Eric Wright	11	1978 1979 1980
	William Moore	11	2005 2006 2007 2008
7	Roger Wehrli	10	1966 1967 1968
	Kevin McIntosh	10	1991 1992 1993 1994
	Harold Piersey	10	1995 1996 1997 1998
	Aarion Penton	10	2013 2014 2015 2016

Single season
Rank	Player	Ints	Year
1	William Moore	8	2007
2	Roger Wehrli	7	1968
3	Andy Russell	6	1962
	Ken Boston	6	1965
	Johnny Roland	6	1965
	Jim Whitaker	6	1966
	Dennis Poppe	6	1969
	Russ Calabrese	6	1977
	Bill Whitaker	6	1979
	Bill Whitaker	6	1980
	Adrian Jones	6	1988
	Wade Perkins	6	1998
	Julian Jones	6	1999

Single game
Rank	Player	Ints	Year	Opponent
1	Roger Wehrli	3	1968	Oklahoma State
	Eric Wright	3	1979	San Diego State
	Bill Whitaker	3	1979	San Diego State
	Bill Whitaker	3	1980	San Diego State
	Clayton Baker	3	1995	North Texas
	RJ Jones	3	2002	Troy State

=== Tackles ===
Career
Rank	Player	Tackles	Years
1	James Kinney	434	2001 2002 2003 2004
2	DeMontie Cross	415	1994 1995 1996
3	Sean Weatherspoon	413	2006 2007 2008 2009
4	Jamonte Robinson	391	1998 1999 2000 2001
5	Travis McDonald	386	1991 1992 1993 1994
6	Darren MacDonald	375	1986 1987 1988 1989
7	Barry Odom	362	1996 1997 1998 1999
8	Sean Doyle	358	1999 2000 2001 2002
	Kentrell Brothers	358	2012 2013 2014 2015
10	Darryl Major	346	1991 1992 1993 1994

Single season
Rank	Player	Tackles	Year
1	Travis McDonald	164	1994
2	Sean Weatherspoon	155	2008
3	Jay Wilson	154	1982
4	Kentrell Brothers	152	2015
5	James Kinney	148	2002
6	James Kinney	147	2003
7	DeMontie Cross	145	1995
8	Sharron Washington	139	1991
9	DeMontie Cross	138	1994
10	Lynn Evans	133	1974

Single game
Rank	Player	Tackles	Year	Opponent
1	Taft Sales	26	1982	Oklahoma State

=== Sacks ===
Career
Rank	Player	Sacks	Years
1	Brian Smith	31.5	2003 2004 2005 2006
2	Justin Smith	22.5	1998 1999 2000
	Stryker Sulak	22.5	2005 2006 2007 2008
4	Lorenzo Williams	19.0	2004 2005 2006 2007
5	Michael Sam	18.5	2010 2011 2012 2013
	Shane Ray	18.5	2012 2013 2014
	Johnny Walker Jr.	18.5	2020 2021 2022 2023 2024
8	Rick Lyle	18.0	1990 1991 1992 1993
9	Bobby Bell	17.0	1981 1982 1983
	Steve Martin	17.0	1992 1993 1994 1995
	Antwaun Bynum	17.0	2000 2001 2002
	Aldon Smith	17.0	2009 2010
	Charles Harris	17.0	2014 2015 2016

Single season
Rank	Player	Sacks	Year
1	Shane Ray	14.5	2014
2	Aldon Smith	11.5	2009
	Michael Sam	11.5	2013
4	Justin Smith	11.0	2000
5	Stryker Sulak	10.5	2008
6	Antwaun Bynum	10.0	2002
	Markus Golden	10.0	2014
8	Kony Ealy	9.5	2013
	Johnny Walker Jr.	9.5	2024
10	Brian Smith	9.0	2005
	Charles Harris	9.0	2016
	Damon Wilson II	9.0	2025
	Daedon Hopkins	9.0	2026

Single game
Rank	Player	Sacks	Year	Opponent
1	Bobby Bell	4.0	1983	BYU
	Justin Smith	4.0	2000	Baylor
	Antwaun Bynum	4.0	2001	Oklahoma State
	Brian Smith	4.0	2006	New Mexico

== Kicking ==
=== Field goals made ===
Career
Rank	Player	FGs	Years
1	Harrison Mevis	86	2020 2021 2022 2023
2	Andrew Baggett	66	2012 2013 2014 2015
3	Tucker McCann	61	2016 2017 2018 2019
4	Jeff Wolfert	59	2006 2007 2008
5	Grant Ressel	52	2008 2009 2010 2011
6	Tom Whelihan	44	1984 1985 1986 1987
7	Jeff Jacke	42	1988 1989 1990 1991 1992
8	Greg Hill	31	1971 1972 1973
9	Tim Gibbons	29	1973 1974 1975 1976
10	Brad Hammerich	27	1998 1999 2000 2001

Single season
Rank	Player	FGs	Year
1	Grant Ressel	26	2009
2	Tucker McCann	24	2018
	Harrison Mevis	24	2023
	Blake Craig	24	2024
5	Harrison Mevis	23	2021
6	Harrison Mevis	22	2022
7	Jeff Wolfert	21	2007
8	Jeff Wolfert	20	2008
9	Jeff Wolfert	18	2006
	Andrew Baggett	18	2013
	Andrew Baggett	18	2014

Single game
Rank	Player	FGs	Year	Opponent
1	Jeff Jacke	5	1992	Kansas
	Harrison Mevis	5	2020	Arkansas
	Harrison Mevis	5	2022	Georgia

=== Field goal percentage ===
Career
Rank	Player	FG%	Years
1	Scott Knickman	85.7%	1995 1996 1997
2	Grant Ressel	83.9%	2008 2009 2010 2011
3	Harrison Mevis	83.5%	2020 2021 2022 2023
4	Jeff Wolfert	81.9%	2006 2007 2008
5	Andrew Baggett	73.3%	2012 2013 2014 2015
6	Mark Norris	72.7%	1995 1996
7	Tucker McCann	72.6%	2016 2017 2018 2019
8	Blake Craig	72.2%	2024 2025
9	Robert Meyer	71.4%	2025
10	Mike Matheny	70.4%	2002 2003

Single season
Rank	Player	FG%	Year
1	Grant Ressel	96.3%	2009
2	Harrison Mevis	92.0%	2021
3	Jeff Wolfert	90.0%	2006
4	Grant Ressel	89.5%	2010
5	Tucker McCann	88.2%	2017
6	Harrison Mevis	85.0%	2020
7	Scott Knickman	84.6%	1997
8	Jeff Wolfert	84.0%	2007
9	Mark Norris	80.0%	1996
	Andrew Baggett	80.0%	2015
	Harrison Mevis	80.0%	2023
