= 1976 Gwyn Staley 400 =

Auto race held at North Wilkesboro Speedway in 1976

Race details
- Race 7 of 30 in the 1976 NASCAR Winston Cup Series
- North Wilkesboro Speedway
- Date: April 4, 1976
- Official name: Gwyn Staley 400
- Location: North Wilkesboro Speedway, North Wilkesboro, North Carolina
- Course: Permanent racing facility
- Course length: 1.005 km (0.625 miles)
- Distance: 400 laps, 250 mi (402 km)
- Weather: Temperatures reaching as warm as 73.9 °F (23.3 °C); wind speeds up to 18.8 miles per hour (30.3 km/h)
- Average speed: 96.858 miles per hour (155.878 km/h)
- Attendance: 18,000

Pole position
| Driver | Dave Marcis | K&K Insurance Racing |

Most laps led
| Driver | Cale Yarborough | Junior Johnson & Associates |
- Laps: 364

Winner
| No. 11 | Cale Yarborough | Junior Johnson & Associates |

Television in the United States
- Network: untelevised
- Announcers: none

The 1976 Gwyn Staley 400 was a NASCAR Winston Cup Series stock car race held on April 4, 1976, at North Wilkesboro Speedway in North Wilkesboro, North Carolina. Contested over 400 laps, it was the seventh race of the 30-event 1976 season. Cale Yarborough of Junior Johnson Motorsports took his second win of the season, while Richard Petty finished second and Bobby Allison third. Benny Parsons left the event with the season points lead.

== Background ==
Three drivers entered the 1970 Wilkes 400 in a very close points race. Bobby Isaac was just ahead of James Hylton, and Bobby Allison was close behind. But Richard Petty, who was out of the points because of a shoulder injury suffered at Darlington in May, was considered the favorite to win the race. Isaac started from the pole for a record-tying fourth consecutive time, matching Fred Lorenzen and Herb Thomas with a qualifying lap time of 21.346 seconds / 105.406 mph. Fans were given quite a show as Isaac and Petty exchanged the lead a total of 11 times throughout the race. Isaac, in the Nord Krauskopf's K&K Insurance Dodge, led 179 laps and took the win by six car lengths over Petty. Petty, who had started the race in the third-place position, would lead the most laps in the race with 216. Bobby Allison started fourth and finished fourth behind his brother, Donnie Allison. And Hylton finished fifth at the end of the day. Isaac advanced to become the 1970 Winston Cup Champion at season's end, with Allison being the runner-up in points.

Bad weather in 1971 caused the Wilkes 400 to be postponed to November 21. Due to the Grand National Series' struggling car counts, cars from NASCAR's Grand American Series were allowed to run in this race. Charlie Glotzbach broke the track record in qualifying at 20.919 seconds / 107.558 mph. It was the first lap ever run under 21 seconds at North Wilkesboro, ending Bobby Isaac's run of five consecutive poles at the track. Tiny Lund, driving a 1970 Camaro, qualified sixth and led just seven laps on his way to the victory. Lund also won another race driving the Camaro that season at Hickory. Glotzbach finished second, six seconds behind Lund, after leading 76 laps in the race. Richard Petty started from the outside pole and led 306 laps to finish third. Dave Marcis finished fourth, two laps down, and Benny Parsons rounded out the top five. Bobby Allison was the only other driver to lead, running 11 laps out front before losing an engine prior to the half.

The Wilkes 400 in 1972 was one of the wildest finishes in NASCAR Cup Series history. Buddy Baker won the pole in the No. 71 K&K Insurance Dodge owned by Nord Krauskopf, but he only led the first lap of the race. Richard Petty and Bobby Allison swapped the lead for the rest of the race, beating and banging each other for the win. At times was more of a demolition derby than a race. Both cars were destroyed by the end, with Allison's car noticeably smoking. This was the peak of the Petty-Allison rivalry. Petty was declared the winner, but in Victory Lane, a fan tried to attack him. But he was defended by his helmet-wielding brother, Maurice Petty. This was Richard Petty's last of 137 wins in a Plymouth.

In the Gwyn Staley 400 of 1973, Bobby Allison landed on the pole with a qualifying lap of 21.077 seconds / 106.750 MPH. Richard Petty qualified on the outside pole, and in dominating fashion he led 386 laps, winning by over four laps. It was Petty's tenth career win at North Wilkesboro and his 151st career NASCAR victory. Benny Parsons led six laps and finished second. Buddy Baker finished third in the No. 71 K&K Insurance Dodge owned by Nord Krauskopf. Allison would end up leading seven laps and finished fourth in the race. Cecil Gordon rounded out the top five finishers. Yvon DuHamel, a top AMA road racer from Quebec, drove a Mercury prepared by Junie Donlavey and finished in tenth place in his only career Cup race. Twenty of the 30 cars that entered the race were running at the finish.

In the Wilkes 400 of 1973 Bobby Allison, driving for his own No. 12 Coca-Cola team won the pole position. He and Richard Petty led most of the race, Allison with 161 and Petty with 222. As Petty led the race late, Allison pitted and got fresh tires on a late pit stop, running down Petty and passing him on the final lap. It was considered as one of the most exciting races ever at North Wilkesboro Speedway.

In 1975 the NASCAR Baby Grand Series, later known as Goody's Dash Series, ran its first race at North Wilkesboro, with a win by Dean Combs. Thirty-seven races were run at the track from 1975-1984,1986-1987, and 1995-1996. Dean Combs had the most wins at the track with 15 victories.

== Race report ==
There were 28 American-born drivers who participated in this race; Jeff Handy finished in last place due to an engine problem on the third lap of this 400-lap race. David Sisco would be knocked out of the race on lap 12 due to a missing rear end while Buddy Baker would be forced to leave the race on lap 38 due to an overheating car. Problems with the vehicle's brakes would relegate Neil Castles to the sidelines on lap 125 while Richard D. Brown would take his vehicle to the garage on lap 172 due to a missing rear end. Problems with the vehicle's rear end would also end Baxter Price's racing weekend on lap 278. Darrell Waltrip's temperamental transmission would force his vehicle to exit the race on lap 291 as the final DNF of the race.

Jabe Thomas was the lowest-finishing driver to finish the race. He was 51 laps behind the leaders.

Cale Yarborough defeated Richard Petty after two and a half hours of racing in front of 18,000 people; it was the first time any driver other than Petty had won the event since 1969. Yarborough won the race by a margin of one lap "and about 100 feet" over Petty; Petty had been ten seconds behind Yarborough before being trapped a lap down during a pit stop under caution, when Yarborough managed to beat the pace car out of the pits while the slower Petty had to wait. Benny Parsons, Yarborough, and Petty had been exchanging the lead amongst each other up to that point. The other drivers who finished in the top ten were Bobby Allison, Parsons, J.D. McDuffie, Lennie Pond, Dick Brooks, Dave Marcis, Richard Childress and Walter Ballard. Yarborough set an average speed of 96.858 miles per hour (155.878 km/h) for the event; he described the race as a turnaround for his team, which had struggled, by his standards, up to that point in the 1976 season.

Marcis, who was described as having his "best season ever" to that point in the year, earned the pole position for the event, setting a speed of 108.585 miles per hour (174.751 km/h) in his Dodge during solo qualifying runs; Marcis' time set a new track record speed, with Parsons and Darrell Waltrip also breaking the old track record. Only two caution periods slowed the race, one for an accident by James Hylton, another for a crash by Junior Miller, who was making his first appearance in professional stock car racing.

Bill Champion would retire from NASCAR competition following the event, along with last-place finisher Jeff Handy.

== Results ==
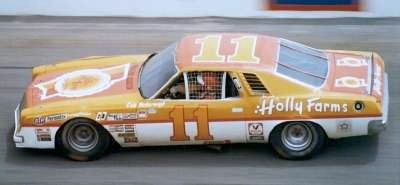
Yarborough drove the No. 11 to victory lane

=== Race results ===
| Pos | Grid | No. | Driver | Team | Manufacturer | Laps | Points |
|---|---|---|---|---|---|---|---|
| 1 | 5 | 11 | Cale Yarborough | Junior Johnson & Associates | Chevrolet | 400 | 185 |
| 2 | 7 | 43 | Richard Petty | Petty Enterprises | Dodge | 399 | 175 |
| 3 | 8 | 2 | Bobby Allison | Penske Racing | Mercury | 397 | 165 |
| 4 | 2 | 72 | Benny Parsons | DeWitt Racing | Chevrolet | 397 | 165 |
| 5 | 12 | 70 | J. D. McDuffie | McDuffie Racing | Chevrolet | 393 | 155 |
| 6 | 9 | 54 | Lennie Pond | Elder Racing | Chevrolet | 391 | 150 |
| 7 | 4 | 90 | Dick Brooks | Donlavey Racing | Ford | 388 | 146 |
| 8 | 1 | 71 | Dave Marcis | Marcis Auto Racing | Dodge | 385 | 142 |
| 9 | 10 | 3 | Richard Childress | Richard Childress Racing | Chevrolet | 385 | 138 |
| 10 | 13 | 30 | Walter Ballard | Ballard Racing | Chevrolet | 378 | 134 |
| 11 | 11 | 92 | Skip Manning # | Hagan Racing | Chevrolet | 375 | 130 |
| 12 | 21 | 24 | Cecil Gordon | Gordon Racing | Chevrolet | 374 | 127 |
| 13 | 19 | 48 | James Hylton | Hylton Motorsports | Chevrolet | 370 | 124 |
| 14 | 14 | 95 | Junior Miller | Miller Racing | Chevrolet | 370 | 121 |
| 15 | 24 | 64 | Elmo Langley | Langley Racing | Ford | 368 | 118 |
| 16 | 22 | 10 | Bill Champion | Champion Racing | Ford | 359 | 115 |
| 17 | 25 | 8 | Ed Negre | Negre Racing | Dodge | 359 | 112 |
| 18 | 16 | 67 | Buddy Arrington | Arrington Racing | Plymouth | 359 | 109 |
| 19 | 20 | 40 | D. K. Ulrich | DeLotto Racing | Chevrolet | 358 | 106 |
| 20 | 15 | 79 | Frank Warren | Warren Racing | Dodge | 354 | 103 |
| 21 | 18 | 25 | Jabe Thomas | Robertson Racing | Chevrolet | 349 | 100 |
| 22 | 3 | 88 | Darrell Waltrip | DiGard Motorsports | Chevrolet | 291 | 97 |
| 23 | 27 | 45 | Baxter Price | Price Racing | Chevrolet | 278 | 94 |
| 24 | 26 | 44 | Richard D. Brown | Brown Racing | Pontiac | 172 | 91 |
| 25 | 23 | 5 | Neil Castles | A-J-S-T Racing | Dodge | 125 | 88 |
| 26 | 6 | 15 | Buddy Baker | Bud Moore Engineering | Ford | 38 | 85 |
| 27 | 17 | 05 | David Sisco | Sisco Racing | Chevrolet | 12 | 82 |
| 28 | 28 | 33 | Jeff Handy | Handy Racing | Chevrolet | 3 | 79 |
# Rookie of the Year candidate / † Driver change following qualifying Source:

| Preceded by 1976 Atlanta 500 | NASCAR Winston Cup Series Season; 1976 | Succeeded by 1976 Rebel 500 |
