= 2012 Missouri Tigers football team =

American college football season

2012 Missouri Tigers football
- Conference: Southeastern Conference
- Eastern Division
- Record: 5–7 (2–6 SEC)
- Head coach: Gary Pinkel (12th season)
- Offensive coordinator: David Yost (4th season)
- Offensive scheme: Spread
- Defensive coordinator: Dave Steckel (4th season)
- Base defense: 4–3
- Home stadium: Faurot Field

2012 Southeastern Conference football standings
	Conf.			Overall
Team	W		L	W		L
Eastern Division
No. T–5 Georgia xy	7	–	1	12	–	2
No. 9 Florida x%	7	–	1	11	–	2
No. 8 South Carolina	6	–	2	11	–	2
No. 23 Vanderbilt	5	–	3	9	–	4
Missouri	2	–	6	5	–	7
Tennessee	1	–	7	5	–	7
Kentucky	0	–	8	2	–	10
Western Division
No. 1 Alabama x$#	7	–	1	13	–	1
No. 14 LSU *	6	–	2	10	–	3
No. T–5 Texas A&M	6	–	2	11	–	2
Mississippi State	4	–	4	8	–	5
Ole Miss *	3	–	5	7	–	6
Arkansas	2	–	6	4	–	8
Auburn	0	–	8	3	–	9
Championship: Alabama 32, Georgia 28
# – BCS National Champion; $ – BCS representative as conference champion; % – BCS at-large representative; x – Division champion/co-champions; y – Championship game participant; * Ole Miss and LSU vacated all wins due to NCAA violations.; Rankings from AP Poll

The 2012 Missouri Tigers football team represented the University of Missouri in the 2012 NCAA Division I FBS football season. The team was coached for the 12th season by Gary Pinkel and played their home games at Faurot Field in Columbia, Missouri for the 87th consecutive season. In their first season as a member of the Eastern Division of the Southeastern Conference, Missouri finished fifth with a record of 2–6 in the conference, and 5–7 overall. As a result, the Tigers failed to qualify for a bowl game for the first time since the 2004 season.

== Recruits ==
Key losses:

- OL John Birdwell
- TE Beau Brinkley
- OL Quinn Brown
- WR Terry Dennis
- DL Brendan Donaldson
- LB Will Ebner
- TE Michael Egnew
- WR Brandon Gerau
- LB Luke Lambert
- DL Dominique Hamilton
- DB Trey Hobson
- OL Dan Hoch
- WR Jerrell Jackson
- S Kenji Jackson
- TE Andrew Jones
- WR Wes Kemp
- LB Tony Randolph
- DL Jacquies Smith

All nineteen recruits signed their National Letter of Intent during the National Signing Period (February 1, 2012 – April 1, 2012).

The recruits signed by February 1.

Almost one-third (six) of the nineteen recruits are from Missouri with three of them from St. Louis and one from Kansas City. Another six were from Texas. Markus Golden, a linebacker from St. Louis as well, is the only junior college transfer. Darius White (the 20th), a wide receiver from Fort Worth, Texas is a transfer from the Texas Longhorns who has already enrolled in the off-season but has to sit out the 2012 season per NCAA transfer rules and will then have two years of eligibility starting in 2013.

College recruiting (2012)
Name	Hometown	School	Height	Weight	40^{‡}	Commit date
Evan Boehm; C	Lee's Summit, MO	Lee's Summit HS	6 ft 3 in (1.91 m)	290 lb (130 kg)	5.00	Dec 21, 2011
Evan Boehm; C	Recruit ratings: Scout: Rivals: (82)					
Torey Boozer; OLB	Everman, TX	Everman HS	6 ft 3 in (1.91 m)	210 lb (95 kg)	?	May 23, 2011
Torey Boozer; OLB	Recruit ratings: Scout: Rivals: (79)					
Harold Brantley; DT	Hershey, PA	Hershey HS	6 ft 3 in (1.91 m)	280 lb (130 kg)	4.80	Jan 29, 2012
Harold Brantley; DT	Recruit ratings: Scout: Rivals: (73)					
Levi Copelin; S	Broken Arrow, OK	Broken Arrow HS	6 ft 2 in (1.88 m)	185 lb (84 kg)	?	Jan 18, 2012
Levi Copelin; S	Recruit ratings: Scout: Rivals: (68)					
Chasten Cuffee; S	Cleburne, TX	Cleburne HS	6 ft 1 in (1.85 m)	185 lb (84 kg)	?	May 23, 2011
Chasten Cuffee; S	Recruit ratings: Scout: Rivals: (76)					
Sean Culkin; TE	Largo, FL	Indian Rocks Christian HS	6 ft 6 in (1.98 m)	210 lb (95 kg)	4.60	Dec 22, 2011
Sean Culkin; TE	Recruit ratings: Scout: Rivals: (74)					
John Gibson; CB	Missouri City, TX	Marshall HS	5 ft 10 in (1.78 m)	175 lb (79 kg)	?	Jan 29, 2012
John Gibson; CB	Recruit ratings: Scout: Rivals: (76)					
Markus Golden; OLB	St. Louis, MO	Affton HS	6 ft 2 in (1.88 m)	245 lb (111 kg)	4.60	May 1, 2011
Markus Golden; OLB	Recruit ratings: Scout: Rivals: (JC)					
Dorial Green-Beckham; WR	Springfield, MO	Hillcrest HS	6 ft 6 in (1.98 m)	220 lb (100 kg)	4.47	Feb 1, 2012
Dorial Green-Beckham; WR	Recruit ratings: Scout: Rivals: (86)					
Russell Hansbrough; RB	Arlington, TX	Bowie HS	5 ft 8 in (1.73 m)	185 lb (84 kg)	4.44	Jan 12, 2012
Russell Hansbrough; RB	Recruit ratings: Scout: Rivals: (77)					
Rickey Hatley; DE	Atlanta, TX	Atlanta HS	6 ft 4 in (1.93 m)	235 lb (107 kg)	?	Dec 10, 2011
Rickey Hatley; DE	Recruit ratings: Scout: Rivals: (75)					
Brandon Holifield; TE	Tallahassee, FL	Amos P. Godby HS	6 ft 5 in (1.96 m)	215 lb (98 kg)	?	Feb 22, 2012
Brandon Holifield; TE	Recruit ratings: Scout: Rivals: (77)					
Maty Mauk; QB	Kenton, OH	Kenton HS	6 ft 2 in (1.88 m)	190 lb (86 kg)	?	Jul 11, 2011
Maty Mauk; QB	Recruit ratings: Scout: Rivals: (80)					
Donavin Newsom; MLB	St. Louis, MO	Parkway North HS	6 ft 2 in (1.88 m)	225 lb (102 kg)	4.50	Jun 8, 2011
Donavin Newsom; MLB	Recruit ratings: Scout: Rivals: (79)					
Michael Scherer; MLB	St. Louis, MO	Mary Institute and St. Louis HS	6 ft 3 in (1.91 m)	230 lb (100 kg)	4.75	Jun 10, 2011
Michael Scherer; MLB	Recruit ratings: Scout: Rivals: (79)					
Morgan Steward; RB	Kansas City, MO	Staley HS	5 ft 11 in (1.80 m)	188 lb (85 kg)	4.52	Mar 1, 2011
Morgan Steward; RB	Recruit ratings: Scout: Rivals: (77)					
Ka'ra Stewart; S	O'Fallon, IL	O'Fallon HS	6 ft 0 in (1.83 m)	190 lb (86 kg)	?	Dec 10, 2011
Ka'ra Stewart; S	Recruit ratings: Scout: Rivals: (78)					
Jordan Williams; OT	Denton, TX	Ryan HS	6 ft 5 in (1.96 m)	250 lb (110 kg)	?	Oct 20, 2011
Jordan Williams; OT	Recruit ratings: Scout: Rivals: (78)					
Evan Winston; DE	Muskegon Heights, MI	Muskegon Heights HS	6 ft 4 in (1.93 m)	255 lb (116 kg)	?	Jul 23, 2011
Evan Winston; DE	Recruit ratings: Scout: Rivals: (76)					
Overall recruit ranking: Scout: 3.05 (#33) Rivals: 3.11 (#31) ESPN: 77
‡ Refers to 40-yard dash; Note: In many cases, Scout, Rivals, 247Sports, On3, and ESPN may conflict in their listings of height, weight and 40 time.; In these cases, the average was taken. ESPN grades are on a 100-point scale.; Sources: "Missouri 2012 Football Commitments". Rivals.; "2012 Missouri Commits". Scout.; "2012 Player Commitments – Missouri". ESPN.; "Scout.com Team Recruiting Rankings". Scout.; "2012 Team Ranking". Rivals.com.

== Schedule ==
Date	Time	Opponent	Site	TV	Result	Attendance
September 1	6:00 pm	Southeastern Louisiana*	Faurot Field; Columbia, MO	FSN PPV	W 62–10	62,173
September 8	6:45 pm	No. 7 Georgia	Faurot Field; Columbia, MO	ESPN2	L 20–41	71,004
September 15	6:00 pm	Arizona State*	Faurot Field; Columbia, MO	ESPN2	W 24–20	71,004
September 22	2:30 pm	at No. 7 South Carolina	Williams-Brice Stadium; Columbia, SC	CBS	L 10–31	80,836
September 29	11:00 am	at UCF*	Bright House Networks Stadium; Orlando, FL	FSN	W 21–16	35,835
October 6	6:00 pm	Vanderbilt	Faurot Field; Columbia, MO	SECRN	L 15–19	66,250
October 13	2:30 pm	No. 1 Alabama	Faurot Field; Columbia, MO	CBS	L 10–42	71,004
October 27	11:00 am	Kentucky^{†}	Faurot Field; Columbia, MO	ESPNU	W 33–10	67,853
November 3	11:00 am	at No. 8 Florida	Ben Hill Griffin Stadium; Gainesville, FL	ESPN2	L 7–14	90,496
November 10	11:21 am	at Tennessee	Neyland Stadium; Knoxville, TN	SECN	W 51–48 ^{4OT}	89,272
November 17	6:00 pm	Syracuse*	Faurot Field; Columbia, MO	ESPNU	L 27–31	63,045
November 24	6:00 pm	at No. 9 Texas A&M	Kyle Field; College Station, TX	ESPN2	L 29–59	87,222
*Non-conference game; ^{†}Homecoming; Rankings from AP Poll; All times are in Central time

Schedule source:

== Coaching staff ==
Name	Position	Years at MU	Alma mater (year)
Gary Pinkel	Head coach	12	Kent State (1975)
Dave Steckel	Assistant head coach Defensive coordinator Linebackers coach	12	Kutztown (1982)
David Yost	Assistant head coach Offensive coordinator Quarterbacks coach Recruiting coordinator	12	Kent State (1992)
Cornell Ford	Cornerbacks coach	12	Toledo (1991)
Alex Grinch	Safeties Coach	4	Mount Union (2002)
Josh Henson	Co – Offensive line coach	4	Oklahoma State (1998)
Andy Hill	Receivers Coach	17	University of Missouri (1985)
Brian Jones	Running backs coach	12	Connecticut (1981)
Craig Kuligowski	Defensive line coach	12	Toledo (1991)
Bruce Walker	Co – Offensive line coach	12	Central Washington (1983)
Dan Hopkins	Director of football operations	6	University of Missouri (2004)
Nick Otterbacher	Director of Football Recruiting	9	Toledo (2002)

Source: 2012 Mizzou Football Roster

David Yost resigned on December 3, suggestingly for personal reasons.

== Roster ==
(as of 8/30/12 MUTIGERS.com, and Rivals.com)
Wide receivers: 2 L'Damian Washington – (redshirt) Junior; 3 Gahn McGaffie – '' (redshirt) Senior; 5 Rolandis Woodland – (redshirt) Senior; 8 Darius White – Junior; 9 Kerwin Stricker – (redshirt) Junior; 14 Jaleel Clark – (redshirt) Junior; 15 Dorial Green-Beckham – Freshman; 16 Levi Copelin – Freshman; 17 Sheldon Gerau – (redshirt) Freshman; 18 Wesley Leftwich – (redshirt) Freshman; 21 Bud Sasser – (redshirt) Sophomore; 22 Joe Plevel – (redshirt) Senior; 28 T. J. Moe – Senior; 43 Cameron Chancey – (redshirt) Freshman; 33 Drew O'Connell – Freshman; 85 Marcus Lucas – Junior; 87 Gavin Otte – Sophomore; 88 Jimmie Hunt – (redshirt) Sophomore; Offensive line: 51 Steven Carberry – (redshirt) Sophomore; 53 Travis Ruth – (redshirt) Senior; 54 Nick Monaghan – (redshirt) Freshman; 56 Robert Luce – (redshirt) Sophomore; 59 Kyle Starke – (redshirt) Freshman; 60 Connor McGovern – (redshirt) Freshman; 61 Max Copeland – (redshirt) Junior; 62 Taylor Chappell – (redshirt) Freshman; 63 Brad McNulty – (redshirt) Freshman; 65 Mitch Morse – (redshirt) Sophomore; 66 Trey Foster – Senior; 67 Michael Boddie – (redshirt) Freshman; 68 Justin Britt – (redshirt) Junior; 69 Mitch Hall – (redshirt) Freshman; 70 Anthony Gatti – (redshirt) Sophomore; 71 Justin Grava – Freshman; 72 Elvis Fisher – (redshirt) Senior; 73 Mitch Hall – (redshirt) Freshman; 74 Chris Freeman – (redshirt) Sophomore; 75 Jack Meiners – Senior; 76 Jordan Williams – Freshman; 77 Evan Boehm – Freshman; 78 Nick Demien – (redshirt) Sophomore; 79 Adam Franklin – (redshirt) Freshman; Tight ends: 26 Jake Brents – Freshman; 46 Kyle Peasel – '' (redshirt) Junior; 80 Sean Culkin – Freshman; 81 Eric Waters – Junior; 84 Brandon Colbert – Sophomore; 86 Jake Hurrell – Freshman	Quarterbacks: 1 James Franklin – Junior; 7 Maty Mauk – Freshman; 11 Reid Swearingen – Freshman; 12 Brock Bondurant – Freshman; 13 Corbin Berkstresser – (redshirt) Freshman; 16 Eric Laurent – Freshman; 17 Alex Demczak – Sophomore; Running (tail) backs: 4 Kendial Lawrence – Senior; 6 Marcus Murphy – (redshirt) Sophomore; 10 Miles Drummond – Freshman; 20 Henry Josey – Junior; 24 Greg White – (redshirt) Sophomore; 32 Russell Hansbrough – Freshman; 33 Jordan Wade – Sophomore; 35 Tyler Hunt – Sophomore; 36 Morgan Steward – Freshman; 38 Jared McGriff-Culver – (redshirt) Senior; 41 Andrew Stevens – Freshman; Defensive line: 34 Sheldon Richardson – (redshirt) Junior; 47 Kony Ealy – (redshirt) Sophomore; 50 Evan Winston – Freshman; 51 Steven Mack – (redshirt) Sophomore; 52 Michael Sam – (redshirt) Junior; 55 Brayden Burnett – (redshirt) Junior; 56 Shane Ray – (redshirt) Freshman; 57 Brad Madison – (redshirt) Senior; 64 Keric Lickerman – Sophomore; 85 Derrion Thomas – (redshirt) Sophomore; 89 Matt Hoch – (redshirt) Sophomore; 90 Harold Brantley – Freshman; 91 Jimmy Burge – (redshirt) Senior; 94 Marvin Foster – (redshirt) Junior; 95 Rickey Hatley – Freshman; 96 Lucas Vincent – (redshirt) Sophomore; 98 Clayton Echard – (redshirt) Freshman; 99 David Butler – Junior; Linebackers: 8 Donovan Bonner – (redshirt) Junior; 10 Kentrell Brothers – (redshirt) Freshman; 11 Torey Boozer – Freshman; 12 Darvin Ruise – (redshirt) Sophomore; 25 Zaviar Gooden – (redshirt) Senior; 32 Will Ebner – (redshirt) Senior; 33 Markus Golden – (redshirt) Sophomore; 40 Clarence Green – (redshirt) Freshman; 41 Donavin Newsom – Freshman; 48 Andrew Wilson – (redshirt) Junior; 50 Denzel Martin – (redshirt) Junior; 54 Michael Brennan – (redshirt) Sophomore; 58 Michael Scherer – Freshman	Safety: 4 Daniel Easterly – (redshirt) Sophomore; 5 Cortland Browning – (redshirt) Freshman; 9 Braylon Webb – (redshirt) Sophomore; 18 Michael Godas – (redshirt) Freshman; 21 Ian Simon – (redshirt) Freshman; 22 Kalen Wilder – Freshman; 30 Kenronte Walker – (redshirt) Senior; Free safety: 17 Matt White – (redshirt) Junior; Defensive backs: 1 Kip Edwards – (redshirt) Senior; 3 David Johnson – (redshirt) Freshman; 7 Randy Ponder – (redshirt) Junior; 13 John Gibson – Freshman; 19 Chaston Ward – Freshman; 26 Xavier Smith – (redshirt) Sophomore; 28 Ernest Payton – (redshirt) Freshman; 29 Zach Edwards – Freshman; 31 E. J. Gaines – Junior; 45 Tyler Davis – (redshirt) Junior; 46 Jared Edwards – Freshman; Punters: 92 Christian Brinser – (redshirt) Sophomore; 97 Trey Barrow – (redshirt) Senior; Kickers: 90 Nick Coffman – Freshman; 91 Blake Owens – (redshirt) Sophomore; 99 Andrew Baggett – (redshirt) Freshman

== Games summaries ==
=== Tennessee ===
Team	1	2	3	4	OT	2OT	3OT	4OT	Total
• Missouri	7	0	14	7	7	7	6	3	51
Tennessee	7	14	7	0	7	7	6	0	48

- Date: November 10
- Location: Neyland Stadium • Knoxville, Tennessee
- Game start: 12:00 p.m. EST
- Television network: SEC Network

Scoring summary
1	4:08	TENN	Cordarrelle Patterson 5-yard run (Michael Parlady kick)	Tennessee 7–0
1	3:55	MIZZ	Jimmie Hunt 87-yard kickoff return (Andrew Baggett kick)	Tie 7–7
2	9:56	TENN	A.J. Johnson 3-yard run (Michael Parlady kick)	Tennessee 14–7
2	4:10	TENN	Mychal Rivera 21-yard pass from Tyler Bray (Michael Parlady kick)	Tennessee 21–7
3	14:38	MIZZ	Kendial Lawrence 77-yard run (Andrew Baggett kick)	Tennessee 21–14
3	8:03	TENN	Alton Howard 16-yard pass from Tyler Bray (Michael Parlady kick)	Tennessee 28–14
3	4:12	MIZZ	Kendial Lawrence 1-yard run (Andrew Baggett kick)	Tennessee 28–21
4	:47	MIZZ	Dorial Green-Beckham 25-yard pass from James Franklin (Andrew Baggett kick)	Tie 28–28
OT		MIZZ	Jimmie Hunt 24-yard pass from James Franklin (Andrew Baggett kick)	Missouri 35–28
OT		TENN	Rajion Neal 8-yard pass from Tyler Bray (Michael Parlady kick)	Tie 35–35
2OT		TENN	Tyler Drummer 5-yard run (Michael Parlady kick)	Tennessee 42–35
2OT		MIZZ	Marcus Lucas 18-yard pass from James Franklin (Andrew Baggett kick)	Tie 42–42
3OT		MIZZ	Dorial Green-Beckham 10-yard pass from James Franklin (two-point conversion failed)	Missouri 48–42
3OT		TENN	Justin Hunter 13-yard pass from Tyler Bray (two-point conversion failed)	Tie 48–48
4OT		MIZZ	Andrew Baggett 35-yard field goal	Missouri 51–48

== Rankings ==
Ranking movements Legend: ██ Increase in ranking ██ Decrease in ranking — = Not ranked RV = Received votes
	Week															
Poll	Pre	1	2	3	4	5	6	7	8	9	10	11	12	13	14	Final
AP	RV	RV	—	RV	—	—	—	—	—	—	—	—	—	—		
Coaches	RV	RV	—	RV	—	—	—	—	—	—	—	—	—	—		
Harris	Not released						—	—	—	—	—	—	—	—		Not released
BCS	Not released							—	—	—	—	—	—	—		Not released
