= 2001 Oklahoma Sooners football team =

American college football season

2001 Oklahoma Sooners football

Cotton Bowl Classic champion

Cotton Bowl Classic, W 10–3 vs. Arkansas
- Conference: Big 12 Conference
- South Division

Ranking
- Coaches: No. 6
- AP: No. 6
- Record: 11–2 (6–2 Big 12)
- Head coach: Bob Stoops (3rd season)
- Offensive coordinator: Mark Mangino (2nd season)
- Offensive scheme: Spread
- Co-defensive coordinators: Mike Stoops (3rd season); Brent Venables (3rd season)
- Base defense: 4–3
- Captains: Rocky Calmus; Josh Norman; Frank Romero; Roy Williams
- Home stadium: Oklahoma Memorial Stadium

2001 Big 12 Conference football standings
	Conf.			Overall
Team	W		L	W		L
North Division
No. 9 Colorado xy$	7	–	1	10	–	3
No. 8 Nebraska x%	7	–	1	11	–	2
Iowa State	4	–	4	7	–	5
Kansas State	3	–	5	6	–	6
Missouri	3	–	5	4	–	7
Kansas	1	–	7	3	–	8
South Division
No. 5 Texas xy	7	–	1	11	–	2
No. 6 Oklahoma	6	–	2	11	–	2
Texas Tech	4	–	4	7	–	5
Texas A&M	4	–	4	8	–	4
Oklahoma State	2	–	6	4	–	7
Baylor	0	–	8	3	–	8
Championship: Colorado 39, Texas 37
$ – BCS representative as conference champion; % – BCS at-large representative; x – Division champion/co-champions; y – Championship game participant; Rankings from AP Poll

The 2001 Oklahoma Sooners football team represented the University of Oklahoma in the 2001 NCAA Division I-A football season, the 107th season of Sooner football. The team was led by third-year head coach Bob Stoops. They played their home games at Oklahoma Memorial Stadium in Norman, Oklahoma. They were a charter member of the Big 12 conference.

Conference play began with a win over the Kansas State Wildcats in Norman on September 29, and ended at home in an upset loss to the Oklahoma State Cowboys in the annual Bedlam Series. The Sooners finished the regular season 10–2 (6–2 in Big 12), finishing second in the Big 12 South. They were invited to the 2002 Cotton Bowl Classic, where they defeated the Arkansas Razorbacks, 10–3.

Following the season, Roy Williams was selected 8th overall in the 2002 NFL draft, along with Rocky Calmus in the 3rd round.

== Schedule ==
Date	Time	Opponent	Rank	Site	TV	Result	Attendance
August 25	6:45 p.m.	North Carolina*	No. 3	Oklahoma Memorial Stadium; Norman, OK (Hispanic College Fund Football Classic)	ESPN	W 41–27	75,423
September 1	2:30 p.m.	at Air Force*	No. 3	Falcon Stadium; Colorado Springs, CO	ABC	W 44–3	56,162
September 8	6:30 p.m.	North Texas*	No. 3	Oklahoma Memorial Stadium; Norman, Oklahoma	FSN PPV	W 37–10	74,930
September 29	11:00 a.m.	No. 11 Kansas State	No. 3	Oklahoma Memorial Stadium; Norman, OK (College GameDay)	ABC	W 38–37	75,862
October 6	2:30 p.m.	vs. No. 5 Texas	No. 3	Cotton Bowl; Dallas, TX (Red River Shootout) (College GameDay)	ABC	W 14–3	75,587
October 13	6:00 p.m.	at Kansas	No. 3	Memorial Stadium; Lawrence, KS	FSN	W 38–10	48,700
October 20	2:00 p.m.	Baylor^{†}	No. 2	Oklahoma Memorial Stadium; Norman, OK		W 33–17	75,499
October 27	11:00 a.m.	at No. 3 Nebraska	No. 2	Memorial Stadium; Lincoln, NE (rivalry) (College GameDay)	ABC	L 10–20	78,031
November 3	2:00 p.m.	Tulsa*	No. 3	Oklahoma Memorial Stadium; Norman, OK	FSN PPV	W 58–0	74,911
November 10	11:00 a.m.	Texas A&M	No. 3	Oklahoma Memorial Stadium; Norman, OK	ABC	W 31–10	75,525
November 17	2:30 p.m.	at Texas Tech	No. 3	Jones SBC Stadium; Lubbock, TX	ABC	W 30–13	52,008
November 24	2:30 p.m.	Oklahoma State	No. 4	Oklahoma Memorial Stadium; Norman, OK (Bedlam Series)	FSN	L 13–16	75,537
January 1, 2002	10:00 a.m.	vs. Arkansas*	No. 10	Cotton Bowl; Dallas, TX (Cotton Bowl Classic)	FOX	W 10–3	72,955
*Non-conference game; ^{†}Homecoming; Rankings from AP Poll released prior to the game; All times are in Central time

== Game summaries ==
=== North Carolina ===
North Carolina Tar Heels at #3 Oklahoma Sooners

Team	1	2	3	4	Total
North Carolina	7	7	0	13	27
• #3 Oklahoma	31	10	0	0	41

- Date: August 25
- Location: Oklahoma Memorial Stadium, Norman, Oklahoma
- Game attendance: 75,423
- TV announcers (ESPN): Ron Franklin (Play–by–play), Mike Gottfried (Color), & Adrian Karsten (Sideline)

=== Air Force ===
#3 Oklahoma Sooners at Air Force Falcons

Team	1	2	3	4	Total
• #3 Oklahoma	7	13	0	24	44
Air Force	0	3	0	0	3

- Date: September 1
- Location: Falcon Stadium, Colorado Springs, Colorado
- TV announcers (ABC): Brent Musburger (Play–by–play), Gary Danielson (Color), & Jack Arute (Sideline)

Scoring summary
1	OU	Nate Hybl 2-yard run (Tim Duncan kick)	OU 7-0
2	OU	Tim Duncan 47-yard field goal	OU 10-0
2	AFA	B. Walters 35-yard field goal	OU 10-3
2	OU	T. Smith 13-yard pass from Hybl (Duncan kick)	OU 17-3
2	OU	T. Duncan 27-yard field goal	OU 20-3
4	OU	T. Duncan 26-yard field goal	OU 23-3
4	OU	Clayton 8-yard pass from Hybl (Duncan kick)	OU 30-3
4	OU	Griffin 3-yard run (Duncan kick)	OU 37-3
4	OU	Heinecke 69-yard fumble return (Duncan kick)	OU 44-3

=== North Texas ===
North Texas Mean Green at #3 Oklahoma Sooners

Team	1	2	3	4	Total
North Texas	3	7	0	0	10
• #3 Oklahoma	14	7	9	7	37

- Date: September 8
- Location: Oklahoma Memorial Stadium, Norman, Oklahoma
- Game attendance: 74,930
- TV announcers (FSN PPV): Bill Land (Play–by–play), Gary Reasons (Color), & Mick Cornett (Sideline)

=== Kansas State ===
#11 Kansas State Wildcats at #3 Oklahoma Sooners

Team	1	2	3	4	Total
#11 Kansas State	0	14	13	10	37
• #3 Oklahoma	14	14	7	3	38

- Date: September 29
- Location: Oklahoma Memorial Stadium, Norman, Oklahoma
- Game attendance: 75,862
- TV announcers (ABC): Brent Musburger (Play–by–play), Gary Danielson (Color), & Jack Arute (Sideline)

=== Texas (Red River Shootout) ===
#3 Oklahoma Sooners vs. #5 Texas Longhorns

Team	1	2	3	4	Total
• #3 Oklahoma	0	7	0	7	14
#5 Texas	0	3	0	0	3

- Date: October 6
- Location: Cotton Bowl, Dallas
- Game attendance: 75,587
- TV announcers (ABC): Brent Musburger (Play–by–play), Gary Danielson (Color), & Jack Arute (Sideline)

=== Kansas ===
#3 Oklahoma Sooners at Kansas Jayhawks

Team	1	2	3	4	Total
• #3 Oklahoma	3	14	7	14	38
Kansas	3	0	0	7	10

- Date: October 13
- Location: Memorial Stadium (University of Kansas), Lawrence, Kansas
- Game attendance: 48,700
- TV announcers (FSN): Joel Meyers (Play–by–play), James Lofton (Color), & Eric Clemons (Sideline)

=== Baylor ===
Baylor Bears at #2 Oklahoma Sooners

Team	1	2	3	4	Total
Baylor	7	0	0	10	17
• #2 Oklahoma	14	13	0	6	33

- Date: October 20
- Location: Oklahoma Memorial Stadium, Norman, Oklahoma
- Game attendance: 75,499

=== Nebraska ===
#2 Oklahoma Sooners at #3 Nebraska Cornhuskers

Team	1	2	3	4	Total
#2 Oklahoma	0	10	0	0	10
• #3 Nebraska	0	10	3	7	20

- Date: October 27
- Location: Memorial Stadium, Lincoln, Nebraska
- Game attendance: 78,031
- TV announcers (ABC): Brent Musburger (Play–by–play), Gary Danielson (Color), & Jack Arute (Sideline)

=== Tulsa ===
Tulsa Golden Hurricane at #3 Oklahoma Sooners

Team	1	2	3	4	Total
Tulsa	0	0	0	0	0
• #3 Oklahoma	3	17	21	17	58

- Date: November 3
- Location: Oklahoma Memorial Stadium, Norman, Oklahoma
- Game attendance: 74,911
- TV announcers (FSN PPV): Bill Jones (Play–by–play), Larry Lacewell (Color), & Zach Klein (Sideline)

=== Texas A&M ===
Texas A&M Aggies at #3 Oklahoma Sooners

Team	1	2	3	4	Total
Texas A&M	10	0	0	0	10
• #3 Oklahoma	0	10	7	14	31

- Date: November 10
- Location: Oklahoma Memorial Stadium, Norman, Oklahoma
- Game attendance: 75,525
- TV announcers (ABC): Sean McDonough (Play–by–play), Ed Cunningham (Color), & Leslie Gudel (Sideline)

=== Texas Tech ===
#3 Oklahoma Sooners at Texas Tech Red Raiders

Team	1	2	3	4	Total
• #3 Oklahoma	3	10	7	10	30
Texas Tech	3	7	0	3	13

- Date: November 17
- Location: Jones SBC Stadium, Lubbock, Texas
- Game attendance: 52,008
- TV announcers (ABC): Sean McDonough (Play–by–play), Ed Cunningham (Color), & Leslie Gudel (Sideline)

=== Oklahoma State (Bedlam Series) ===
Oklahoma State Cowboys at #4 Oklahoma Sooners

Team	1	2	3	4	Total
• Oklahoma State	0	6	0	10	16
#4 Oklahoma	0	10	0	3	13

- Date: November 24
- Location: Oklahoma Memorial Stadium, Norman, Oklahoma
- Game start: 2:30 p.m CST
- Elapsed time: 3:50
- Game attendance: 75,537
- Game weather: Mostly sunny; 64 °F (18 °C); wind 24 mph (39 km/h) W
- Referee: Mike Weir
- TV announcers (FSN): Joel Meyers (Play–by–play), James Lofton (Color), & Eric Clemons (Sideline)

Scoring summary
Q2	9:20	OU	Griffin 8 yard run (Duncan kick)	OU 7–0
Q2	4:40	OSU	Phillips 26 yard field goal	OU 7–3
Q2	0:53	OU	Duncan 23 yard field goal	OU 10–3
Q2	0:05	OSU	Phillips 52 yard field goal	OU 10–6
Q4	8:48	OU	Duncan 22 yard field goal	OU 13–6
Q4	7:31	OSU	Phillips 52 yard field goal	OU 13–9
Q4	1:36	OSU	Woods 14 yard pass from Fields (Phillips kick)	OSU 16–13

=== Arkansas (Cotton Bowl) ===
#10 Oklahoma Sooners vs. Arkansas Razorbacks

Team	1	2	3	4	Total
• #10 Oklahoma	7	0	3	0	10
Arkansas	0	0	0	3	3

- Date: January 1
- Location: Cotton Bowl, Dallas
- Game attendance: 72,955
- TV announcers (FOX): Thom Brennaman (Play–by–play), Tim Green, Dave Lapham (Colors), & Brian Baldinger (Sideline)

== Roster ==
2001 Oklahoma Sooners football team roster
Players
Coaches
Offense

Pos.	#	Name	Class
WR	9	Mark Clayton	Fr
TE	86	Lance Donley	So
OL	68	Howard Duncan	Sr
OL	69	Brad Davis	Jr
RB	22	Quentin Griffin	Jr
QB	8	Nate Hybl	Jr
WR	3	Josh Norman	Sr
RB	24	Brian Odom	Fr
WR	6	Antwone Savage	Jr
OL	60	Wes Sims	Fr
OL	75	Mike Skinner	Jr
TE	88	Trent Smith	Jr
QB	18	Jason White	So

Defense

Pos.	#	Name	Class
LB	11	Teddy Lehman	So
DL	55	Jammal Brown	Fr
LB	20	Rocky Calmus	Sr
DT	80	Dan Cody	Fr
LB	25	Andrew Brewer	Fr
DT	97	Tommie Harris	Fr
DT	93	Kory Klein	So
DE	45	Jimmy Wilkerson	So
FS	38	Roy Williams	Jr
DB	17	Andre Woolfolk	Jr

Special teams

Pos.	#	Name	Class
PK	40	Tim Duncan	Sr

Head coach

- Bob Stoops

Coordinators/assistant coaches

- Mark Mangino – Offensive coordinator
- Chuck Long – Quarterbacks
- Cale Gundy – Running backs
- Steve Spurrier Jr. – Wide receivers
- Jonathan Hayes – Tight ends & special teams
- Mike Stoops – Co-defensive coordinator & defensive backs
- Brent Venables – Co-defensive coordinator & linebackers
- Jackie Shipp – Defensive line
- Bobby Jack Wright – Defensive ends

Legend

- (C) Team captain
- (S) Suspended
- (I) Ineligible
- Injured
- Redshirt

Roster

== Rankings ==
Ranking movements Legend: ██ Increase in ranking ██ Decrease in ranking
	Week																
Poll	Pre	1	2	3	4	5	6	7	8	9	10	11	12	13	14	15	Final
AP	3	3	3	3	3	3	3	2	2	3	3	3	4	11	11	10	6
Coaches Poll	3	3	3	3	3	3	3	2	2	4	4	4	4	11	11	10	6
BCS	Not released								1	2	3	3	3	9	11	11	Not released

== 2002 NFL draft ==
The 2002 NFL draft was held on April 20–21, 2002 at The Theater at Madison Square Garden in New York City The following Oklahoma players were either selected or signed as undrafted free agents following the draft. Roy Williams was the highest Sooner drafted since Cedric Jones went fifth overall in 1996.

Player	Position	Round	Overall pick	NFL team
Roy Williams	S	1st	8	Dallas Cowboys
Rocky Calmus	LB	3rd	77	Tennessee Titans
Tim Duncan	K	Undrafted		Arizona Cardinals
Brandon Moore	LB	Undrafted		San Francisco 49ers
Josh Norman	TE	Undrafted		San Diego Chargers
