= 2001 Oklahoma State Cowboys football team =

American college football season

2001 Oklahoma State Cowboys football
- Conference: Big 12 Conference
- South Division
- Record: 4–7 (2–6 Big 12)
- Head coach: Les Miles (1st season)
- Offensive coordinator: Mike Gundy (2nd season)
- Offensive scheme: Pro spread
- Defensive coordinator: Bill Clay (1st season)
- Base defense: 3–4
- Home stadium: Lewis Field

2001 Big 12 Conference football standings
| | Conf. | | | Overall |
| Team | W | | L | W | | L |
|---|---|---|---|---|---|---|
North Division
| No. 9 Colorado xy$ | 7 | – | 1 | 10 | – | 3 |
| No. 8 Nebraska x% | 7 | – | 1 | 11 | – | 2 |
| Iowa State | 4 | – | 4 | 7 | – | 5 |
| Kansas State | 3 | – | 5 | 6 | – | 6 |
| Missouri | 3 | – | 5 | 4 | – | 7 |
| Kansas | 1 | – | 7 | 3 | – | 8 |
South Division
| No. 5 Texas xy | 7 | – | 1 | 11 | – | 2 |
| No. 6 Oklahoma | 6 | – | 2 | 11 | – | 2 |
| Texas Tech | 4 | – | 4 | 7 | – | 5 |
| Texas A&M | 4 | – | 4 | 8 | – | 4 |
| Oklahoma State | 2 | – | 6 | 4 | – | 7 |
| Baylor | 0 | – | 8 | 3 | – | 8 |
Championship: Colorado 39, Texas 37
$ – BCS representative as conference champion; % – BCS at-large representative; x – Division champion/co-champions; y – Championship game participant; Rankings from AP Poll

The 2001 Oklahoma State Cowboys football team represented Oklahoma State University as a member of the Big 12 Conference during the 2001 NCAA Division I-A football season. Led by first-year head coach Les Miles, the Cowboys compiled an overall record of 4–7 with a mark of 2–6 in conference play, placing fifth in the Big 12's South Division. Oklahoma State played home games at Lewis Field in Stillwater, Oklahoma.

In the final game of the season, the Cowboys, amidst a losing campaign, went to Norman, Oklahoma and upset their in-state rivals, the Oklahoma Sooners, who were contending for a national championship.

== Schedule ==
| Date | Time | Opponent | Site | TV | Result | Attendance | Source |
|---|---|---|---|---|---|---|---|
| September 1 | 11:00 a.m. | at Southern Miss* | M. M. Roberts Stadium; Hattiesburg, MS | ESPN | L 9–17 | 25,134 | |
| September 8 | 7:00 p.m. | Louisiana Tech* | Lewis Field; Stillwater, OK | | W 30–23 | 41,205 | |
| September 15 | | Northern Arizona* | Lewis Field; Stillwater, OK | | Canceled | | |
| September 22 | 11:30 a.m. | at Texas A&M | Kyle Field; College Station, TX | FSN | L 7–21 | 82,601 | |
| September 29 | 7:00 p.m. | Northwestern State* | Lewis Field; Stillwater, OK | | W 24–0 | 36,110 | |
| October 6 | 7:00 p.m. | Missouri | Lewis Field; Stillwater, OK | | L 38–41 ^{3OT} | 44,050 | |
| October 13 | 11:30 a.m. | No. 11 Texas | Lewis Field; Stillwater, OK | FSN | L 17–45 | 47,390 | |
| October 20 | 1:00 p.m. | at Iowa State | Jack Trice Stadium; Ames, IA | | L 14–28 | 49,459 | |
| October 27 | 6:00 p.m. | No. 25 Colorado^{†} | Lewis Field; Stillwater, OK | FSN | L 19–22 | 41,070 | |
| November 10 | 1:00 p.m. | Texas Tech | Lewis Field; Stillwater, OK | | L 30–49 | 32,332 | |
| November 17 | 1:00 p.m. | at Baylor | Floyd Casey Stadium; Waco, TX | | W 38–22 | 21,873 | |
| November 24 | 2:30 p.m. | at No. 4 Oklahoma | Oklahoma Memorial Stadium; Norman, OK (Bedlam Series) | FSN | W 16–13 | 75,537 | |
*Non-conference game; ^{†}Homecoming; Rankings from AP Poll released prior to the game; All times are in Central time

== Game summaries ==
=== Oklahoma ===
| Team | 1 | 2 | 3 | 4 | Total |
|---|---|---|---|---|---|
| • Oklahoma State | 0 | 6 | 0 | 10 | 16 |
| Oklahoma | 0 | 10 | 0 | 3 | 13 |

- Date: November 24
- Location: Oklahoma Memorial Stadium, Norman, Oklahoma
- Game start: 2:30 p.m. CST
- Elapsed time: 3:50
- Game attendance: 75,537
- Game weather: Mostly sunny; 64 °F (18 °C); wind 24 mph (39 km/h) W
- Referee: Mike Weir
- TV announcers (FSN): Joel Meyers (play–by–play), James Lofton (color), & Eric Clemons (sideline)

Scoring summary
| Q2 | 9:20 | OKLA | Griffin 8 yard run (Duncan kick) | OKLA 7–0 |
| Q2 | 4:40 | OKST | Phillips 26 yard field goal | OKLA 7–3 |
| Q2 | :53 | OKLA | Duncan 23 yard field goal | OKLA 10–3 |
| Q2 | :05 | OKST | Phillips 52 yard field goal | OKLA 10–6 |
| Q4 | 8:48 | OKLA | Duncan 22 yard field goal | OKLA 13–6 |
| Q4 | 7:31 | OKST | Phillips 52 yard field goal | OKLA 13–9 |
| Q4 | 1:36 | OKST | Woods 14 yard pass from Fields (Phillips kick) | OKST 16–13 |

- Rashaun Woods 8 Rec, 129 Yds

== Team players drafted in the NFL ==
No one from the Cowboys was selected in the 2002 NFL draft. Kevin Williams was selected ninth overall in the 2003 NFL draft. Rashaun Woods (31st overall), Tatum Bell (41st overall), and Antonio Smith (135th overall) were selected in the 2004 NFL draft. Linebacker Dwayne Levels was not selected in an NFL draft, but played one season in the league. Darrent Williams, a true freshman starter at cornerback, was drafted in the second round (56th overall) of the 2005 NFL draft. Billy Bajema, a freshman tight end, was selected in the seventh round of the 2005 NFL draft.
