= Brad Smith (American football, born 1983) =

American football player (born 1983)

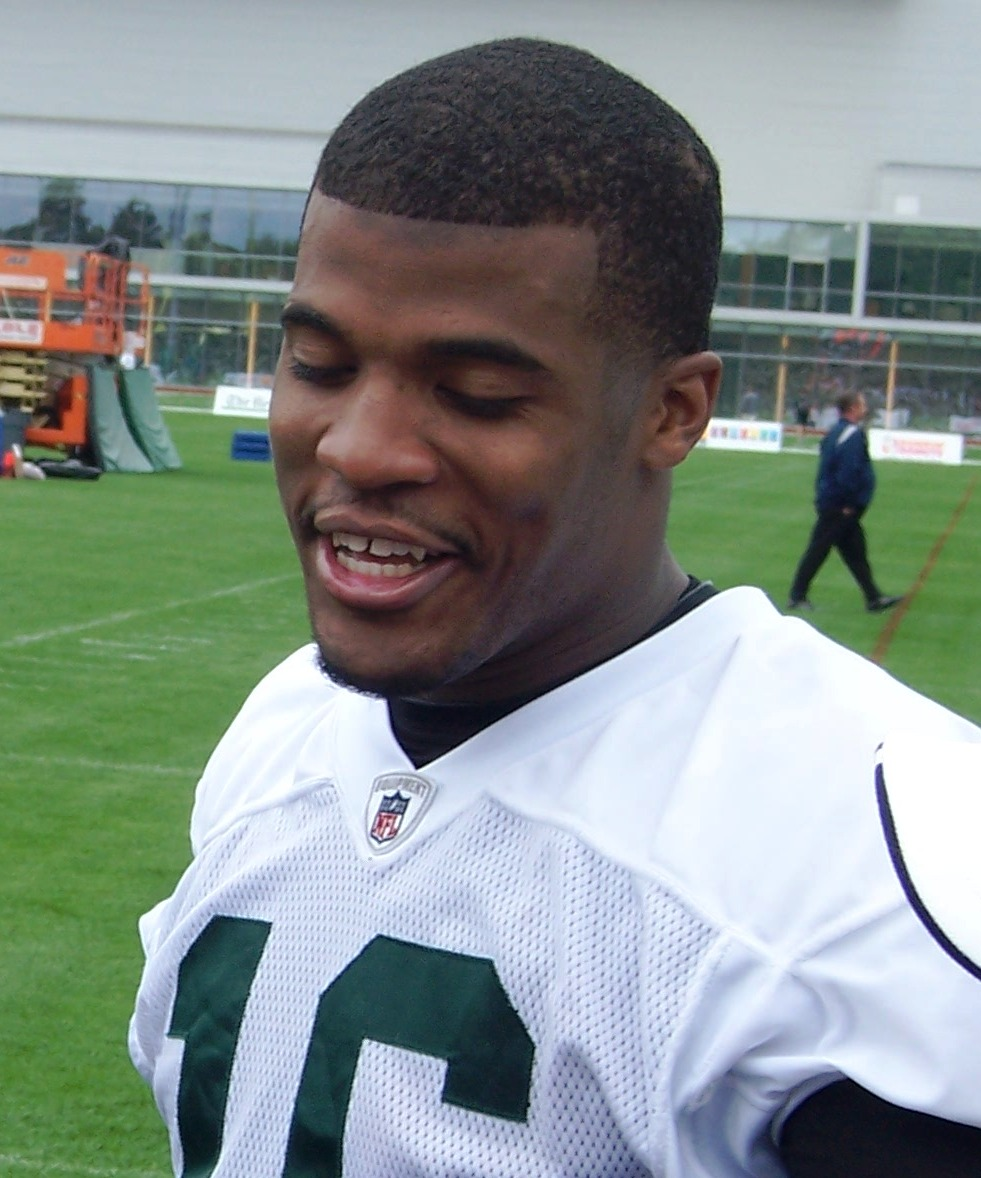
- Smith with the New York Jets in 2009

No. 16
- Positions: Wide receiver, quarterback

Personal information
- Born: December 12, 1983 (age 42); Youngstown, Ohio, U.S.
- Listed height: 6 ft 2 in (1.88 m)
- Listed weight: 213 lb (97 kg)

Career information
- High school: Chaney (Youngstown)
- College: Missouri (2001–2005)
- NFL draft: 2006: 4th round, 103rd overall pick

Career history
- New York Jets (2006–2010); Buffalo Bills (2011–2013); Philadelphia Eagles (2013–2014)

Awards and highlights
- First-team All-Big 12 (2005); Big 12 Offensive Freshman of the Year (2002)

Career NFL statistics
- Receptions: 104
- Receiving yards: 987
- Return yards: 2,879
- Total touchdowns: 14
- Stats at Pro Football Reference

Bradley Alexander Smith (born December 12, 1983) is an American former professional football player who was a wide receiver in the National Football League (NFL) and quarterback in college football for the Missouri Tigers. Smith was selected in the fourth round of the 2006 NFL draft by the New York Jets. He also played in the NFL for the Buffalo Bills and Philadelphia Eagles.

== College career ==
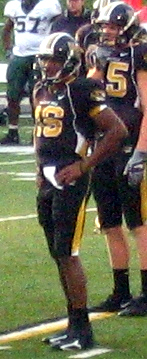
Smith while with Missouri

After being redshirted in 2001, he became a four-year starter for the Missouri Tigers, never missing a start. In his redshirt freshman season, he established himself as a quarterback in college football, becoming only the second player in Division I-A history to both pass for 2,000 yards and rush for 1,000 in the same year. He earned numerous national and Big 12 Conference freshman honors while leading Missouri to a 5–7 record.

In his redshirt sophomore season, Smith guided the Tigers to an 8–5 record and their first bowl appearance since 1998, a 14–27 loss to the Arkansas Razorbacks in the 2003 Independence Bowl. That year, he scored 18 rushing touchdowns and one receiving touchdown, setting a program record with 19 total touchdowns from scrimmage, surpassing the 18 scored by Devin West in 1998. Running back Derrick Washington later tied Smith's record in 2008.

In his junior season, Missouri went a disappointing 5–6 after beginning the year ranked No. 17 by the Associated Press. During his senior season, he led the Tigers to a 7–5 record and their second Independence Bowl in three years, earning the program's first bowl victory in seven years with a 38–31 win over the South Carolina Gamecocks, where he was named offensive MVP.

Smith was working on his graduate degree in economics at Missouri upon being drafted. He received his business degree from Missouri in May 2005.

Smith has set numerous Missouri, Big 12, and Division I-A records. In his junior season, he was considered a preseason Heisman Trophy candidate by many, but Missouri and Smith did not live up to expectations, achieving only a 5–6 record.

Smith excelled in the classroom and was named to the Big 12 All-Academic Team. He participated in the Mike Jones Football Clinic, Chancellor's Lunch, Big Brothers and Big Sisters Bowl for Kids' Sake, Student-Athlete Advisory Committee Food Drive, Truman Club, and Athletes-in-Action, among others.

=== College ===
Season	Team	Games			Passing								Rushing			
Season	Team	GP	GS	Record	Cmp	Att	Pct	Yds	Avg	TD	Int	Rate	Att	Yds	Avg	TD
2001	Missouri	0	0	—	Redshirted (redshirt)											
2002	Missouri	12	12	5–7	196	366	53.6	2,333	6.4	15	6	117.3	193	1,029	5.3	7
2003	Missouri	13	13	8–5	211	350	60.3	1,977	5.6	11	7	114.1	212	1,406	6.6	18
2004	Missouri	11	11	5–6	191	369	51.8	2,185	5.9	17	11	110.7	165	553	3.4	4
2005	Missouri	12	12	7–5	237	399	59.4	2,304	5.8	13	9	114.1	229	1,301	5.7	16
Career		48	48	25–23	835	1,484	56.3	8,799	5.9	56	33	114.1	799	4,289	5.4	45

=== Accomplishments and honors ===
- First player in Division I-A history to pass for 8,000 yards and run for 4,000 yards in career.
- First player in Division I-A history to pass for 2,000 yards and run for 1,000 yards in a season twice in a career.
- Second player in Division I-A history to rush for 1,000 yards and pass for 2,000 yards in a season.
- Fourth player in Division I-A history to score 200 points and pass for 200 points in a career.
- Sixth player in Division I-A history to pass for 200 yards and rush for 200 yards in a single game (vs. Nebraska on October 22, 2005).
- Most rushing yards in Division I-A history by a freshman quarterback.
- 2005 Independence Bowl co-MVP.
- 2006 Hula Bowl MVP.
- 2002 1st-Team Freshman All-American by FWAA, The Sporting News, College Football News, and Rivals.com.
- 2002 Honorable Mention All-American by CNNSI.com, College Football News.
- 2002 and 2003 honorable mention All-Big 12 by AP.
- 2002 and 2004 Honorable Mention All-Big 12 by Coaches.
- 2003 4th-Team All-American by College Sports Report.
- 2003 3rd-Team All-Big 12 by Coaches.
- 2005 Draddy Trophy Finalist.
- 2005 Honorable Mention All-Big 12.
- 2005 Davey O'Brien Award Semi-Finalist.
- 2010 Pudding Pie Award.

Smith holds school records for career rushing yards, career total yards, most points in a game (30) and most touchdowns (5) (vs. Texas Tech on October 25, 2003).

== Professional career ==
Pre-draft measurables
Height	Weight	Arm length	Hand span	40-yard dash	10-yard split	20-yard split	20-yard shuttle	Three-cone drill	Vertical jump	Broad jump
6 ft 2 1/8 in (1.88 m)	213 lb (97 kg)	33 1/2 in (0.85 m)	10 in (0.25 m)	4.49 s	1.58 s	2.64 s	4.33 s	7.00 s	39.5 in (1.00 m)	10 ft 8 in (3.25 m)
All values from NFL Combine

=== New York Jets ===
Smith was selected in the fourth round with the 103rd overall pick in the 2006 NFL draft. The New York Jets drafted Smith as a Wide Receiver/Running Back/Quarterback in the fourth round. He was signed by the New York Jets on July 21, 2006, as a Wide Receiver/Quarterback. In a preseason game in 2007, he was played at quarterback and rallied the Jets to 10 points and scrambled for the game-winning touchdown. He was then declared a "bona fide quarterback" by Jets coach Eric Mangini and was listed higher on the depth chart at quarterback than wide receiver. Through Week 5 of the 2007 season, the Jets used Smith in a variety of ways, lining him up at quarterback, running back, and wide receiver. He was also a standout on special teams. Smith scored his first career receiving touchdown on October 7, 2007, against the New York Giants.

On December 16, 2007, Smith substituted for starter Kellen Clemens who was injured in a game against the New England Patriots. Smith would then alternate with former starter Chad Pennington for the rest of the game, running an option and also attempting a pass. He is also a winner of the Jets' 2007 Kyle Clifton Good Guy Award, which recognizes consistent willingness, cooperation and professionalism in everyday dealings with various departments in organization.

Smith was used in the Jets' wildcat formations. He had been injured (quad) throughout the beginning of the 2009 season, but emerged to become a leader of special teams, including being the starting kick returner. On December 13, 2009, Smith ran a fake punt play, in which he completed a pass to Eric Smith, having the longest completion of any team that day, the play went for 27 yards. On December 27, 2009, Smith returned the opening kickoff of the 2nd half for a 106-yard touchdown against the Indianapolis Colts. This is the longest play in New York Jets history, and tied for the second longest kickoff return in NFL history. In the last game of the 2009 regular season, Smith had 91 rushing yards, lining up at quarterback each time, having a 57-yard play, and scoring a 32-yard touchdown.

During the 2010 season, Smith was mostly used as a wildcat specialist and return specialist. One of Smith's best games was on Thanksgiving of November 25, 2010, where he scored a 53-yard touchdown on a wildcat end-around and an 89-yard kickoff return touchdown in a Jets 26–10 victory over the Cincinnati Bengals.

=== Buffalo Bills ===
Smith agreed to a four-year, $15 million contract with the Buffalo Bills on July 28, 2011. The Bills used him that season mostly out of wildcat formations, and they also used him as a wide receiver. During the 2012 season, Smith returned an 89-yard kick off for a touchdown in a loss vs. the Tennessee Titans.

On November 8, 2013, the Bills released Smith off of their injured-reserve list.

=== Philadelphia Eagles ===
Smith was signed by the Eagles on November 12, 2013.

== Personal life ==
Smith and his wife Rosalynn have a son and a daughter.
