= 2001 Iowa State Cyclones football team =

American college football season

2001 Iowa State Cyclones football

Independence Bowl, L 13–14 vs. Alabama
- Conference: Big 12 Conference
- North Division
- Record: 7–5 (4–4 Big 12)
- Head coach: Dan McCarney (7th season)
- Offensive coordinator: Steve Loney (5th season)
- Offensive scheme: Pro-style
- Defensive coordinator: John Skladany (5th season)
- Base defense: 4–3
- Home stadium: Jack Trice Stadium

2001 Big 12 Conference football standings
| | Conf. | | | Overall |
| Team | W | | L | W | | L |
|---|---|---|---|---|---|---|
North Division
| No. 9 Colorado xy$ | 7 | – | 1 | 10 | – | 3 |
| No. 8 Nebraska x% | 7 | – | 1 | 11 | – | 2 |
| Iowa State | 4 | – | 4 | 7 | – | 5 |
| Kansas State | 3 | – | 5 | 6 | – | 6 |
| Missouri | 3 | – | 5 | 4 | – | 7 |
| Kansas | 1 | – | 7 | 3 | – | 8 |
South Division
| No. 5 Texas xy | 7 | – | 1 | 11 | – | 2 |
| No. 6 Oklahoma | 6 | – | 2 | 11 | – | 2 |
| Texas Tech | 4 | – | 4 | 7 | – | 5 |
| Texas A&M | 4 | – | 4 | 8 | – | 4 |
| Oklahoma State | 2 | – | 6 | 4 | – | 7 |
| Baylor | 0 | – | 8 | 3 | – | 8 |
Championship: Colorado 39, Texas 37
$ – BCS representative as conference champion; % – BCS at-large representative; x – Division champion/co-champions; y – Championship game participant; Rankings from AP Poll

The 2001 Iowa State Cyclones football team represented Iowa State University as a member of the North Division in the Big 12 Conference during the 2001 NCAA Division I-A football season. Led by seventh-year head coach Dan McCarney, the Cyclones compiled an overall record of 7–5 with a mark of 4–4 in conference play, placing third in the Big 12's North Division. Iowa State was invited to the Independence Bowl, where the Cyclones lost to Alabama. The team played home games at Jack Trice Stadium in Ames, Iowa.

== Schedule ==
| Date | Time | Opponent | Site | TV | Result | Attendance |
|---|---|---|---|---|---|---|
| September 8 | 6:30 p.m. | No. 24 (I-AA) Northern Iowa* | Jack Trice Stadium; Ames, IA | | W 45–0 | 47,092 |
| September 22 | 12:00 p.m. | at Ohio* | Peden Stadium; Athens, OH | | W 31–28 | 24,000 |
| September 29 | 1:00 p.m. | Baylor | Jack Trice Stadium; Ames, IA | | W 41–0 | 44,189 |
| October 6 | 6:00 p.m. | at No. 4 Nebraska | Memorial Stadium; Lincoln, NE (rivalry) | FSN | L 14–48 | 78,002 |
| October 13 | 1:00 p.m. | at Missouri | Faurot Field; Columbia, MO (rivalry) | | W 20–14 | 50,671 |
| October 20 | 1:00 p.m. | Oklahoma State^{†} | Jack Trice Stadium; Ames, IA | | W 28–14 | 49,459 |
| October 27 | 1:00 p.m. | at No. 24 Texas A&M | Kyle Field; College Station, TX | | L 21–24 | 85,661 |
| November 3 | 1:00 p.m. | Kansas State | Jack Trice Stadium; Ames, IA (rivalry) | | L 3–42 | 40,228 |
| November 10 | 6:00 p.m. | No. 21 Colorado | Jack Trice Stadium; Ames, IA | FSN | L 27–40 | 39,024 |
| November 17 | 11:30 a.m. | at Kansas | Memorial Stadium; Lawrence, KS | FSN | W 49–7 | 33,500 |
| November 24 | 11:30 a.m. | Iowa* | Jack Trice Stadium; Ames, IA (rivalry) | FSN | W 17–14 | 51,042 |
| December 27 | 6:30 p.m. | vs. Alabama* | Independence Stadium; Shreveport, LA (Independence Bowl) | ESPN | L 13–14 | 45,627 |
*Non-conference game; ^{†}Homecoming; Rankings from AP Poll released prior to the game; All times are in Central time

== Game summaries ==
=== at No. 4 Nebraska ===
Iowa State at No. 4 Nebraska

| Team | 1 | 2 | 3 | 4 | Total |
|---|---|---|---|---|---|
| Cyclones | 0 | 0 | 14 | 0 | 14 |
| • No. 4 Cornhuskers | 20 | 21 | 0 | 7 | 48 |

- Date: October 6
- Location: Memorial Stadium, Lincoln, Nebraska
- Game attendance: 78,002
- TV announcers (FSN): Joel Meyers (play–by–play), James Lofton (color), & Eric Clemons (sideline)

=== No. 21 Colorado ===
No. 21 Colorado at Iowa State

| Team | 1 | 2 | 3 | 4 | Total |
|---|---|---|---|---|---|
| • No. 21 Buffaloes | 10 | 13 | 7 | 10 | 40 |
| Cyclones | 14 | 0 | 0 | 13 | 27 |

- Date: November 10
- Location: Jack Trice Stadium, Ames, Iowa
- Game attendance: 39,024

=== Iowa ===
Iowa at Iowa State

| Team | 1 | 2 | 3 | 4 | Total |
|---|---|---|---|---|---|
| Hawkeyes | 0 | 0 | 14 | 0 | 14 |
| • Cyclones | 7 | 7 | 0 | 3 | 17 |

- Date: November 24
- Location: Jack Trice Stadium, Ames, IA
- Game start: 11:39am CST
- Elapsed time: 2:50
- Game attendance: 51,042
- Game weather: 57 °F (14 °C), Partly cloudy, Wind S 10–20 mph (16–32 km/h)
- Referee: Bill LeMonnier
- TV announcers (FSN): Ron Thulin, Gary Reasons

Scoring summary
| 1 | 7:09 | ISU | Lane Danielsen 2-yard pass from Seneca Wallace (Tony Yelk kick) | ISU 7–0 |
| 2 | 0:57 | ISU | Ennis Haywood 7-yard run (Tony Yelk kick) | ISU 14–0 |
| 3 | 9:06 | IOWA | Ladell Betts 14-yard pass from Kyle McCann (Nate Kaeding kick) | ISU 14–7 |
| 3 | 5:48 | IOWA | Ladell Betts 42-yard run (Nate Kaeding kick) | Tied 14–14 |
| 4 | 14:52 | ISU | Tony Yelk 32-yard field goal | ISU 17–14 |

The annual battle for the Cy-Hawk Trophy was scheduled originally for September 15, but due to the September 11 attacks, it was postponed or canceled like all sporting events planned for that weekend. The game was rescheduled for November 24, which turned out to be a natural fit since many other major rivalries were played that weekend.

Iowa State scored a touchdown in each of the first two quarters to head into halftime with a 14–0 lead. Iowa finally responded in the third quarter with two touchdowns to tie the score.

The final scoring play of the game came early in the fourth quarter, with Tony Yelk kicking a 32-yard field goal to put the Cyclones up 17–14. An interception by Adam Runk with 1:37 remaining sealed the game for the Cyclones.

=== vs. Alabama—Independence Bowl ===
Alabama vs. Iowa State

| Team | 1 | 2 | 3 | 4 | Total |
|---|---|---|---|---|---|
| • Crimson Tide | 0 | 7 | 0 | 7 | 14 |
| Cyclones | 3 | 7 | 3 | 0 | 13 |

- Date: December 27
- Location: Independence Stadium, Shreveport, LA
- Game attendance: 45,627
- Game weather: 57 °F (14 °C), Partly cloudy, Wind S 10–20 mph (16–32 km/h)
- Referee: Ron Cherry (ACC)
- TV announcers (ESPN): Rich Waltz (play-by-play), Mark May (analyst), and Heather Cox (sideline)

== Roster ==
2001 Iowa State Cyclones football team roster
Players
Coaches
Offense

| Pos. | # | Name | Class |
|---|---|---|---|
| RB | 2 | Ennis Haywood | Sr |
| RB | 12 | Hiawatha Rutland | So |
| QB | 15 | Seneca Wallace | Jr |
| QB | 16 | Chris Love | Fr |
| WR | 26 | Jack Whitver | So |
| TE | 31 | Mike Banks | Sr |
| FB | 45 | Joe Woodley | So |
| WR | 82 | Lane Danielsen | So |
| WR | 83 | Jamaul Montgomery | So |
| WR | 87 | Tom Anthony | Fr |

Defense

| Pos. | # | Name | Class |
|---|---|---|---|
| LB | 7 | Matt Word | Jr |
| DB | 9 | Nik Moser | Fr |
| LB | 41 | Jeremy Loyd | Jr |
| DL | 92 | Jordan Carstens | So |

Special teams

| Pos. | # | Name | Class |
|---|---|---|---|
| K | 14 | Tony Yelk | Fr |

Head coach

- Dan McCarney

Coordinators/assistant coaches

Legend

- (C) Team captain
- (S) Suspended
- (I) Ineligible
- Injured
- Redshirt

Roster
Last update: 2018-04-17
