= 2001 Kansas State Wildcats football team =

American college football season

2001 Kansas State Wildcats football

Insight.com Bowl, L 3–25 vs. Syracuse
- Conference: Big 12 Conference
- North
- Record: 6–6 (3–5 Big 12)
- Head coach: Bill Snyder (13th season)
- Offensive coordinator: Ron Hudson (5th season)
- Defensive coordinator: Phil Bennett (3rd season)
- Home stadium: KSU Stadium

2001 Big 12 Conference football standings
	Conf.			Overall
Team	W		L	W		L
North Division
No. 9 Colorado xy$	7	–	1	10	–	3
No. 8 Nebraska x%	7	–	1	11	–	2
Iowa State	4	–	4	7	–	5
Kansas State	3	–	5	6	–	6
Missouri	3	–	5	4	–	7
Kansas	1	–	7	3	–	8
South Division
No. 5 Texas xy	7	–	1	11	–	2
No. 6 Oklahoma	6	–	2	11	–	2
Texas Tech	4	–	4	7	–	5
Texas A&M	4	–	4	8	–	4
Oklahoma State	2	–	6	4	–	7
Baylor	0	–	8	3	–	8
Championship: Colorado 39, Texas 37
$ – BCS representative as conference champion; % – BCS at-large representative; x – Division champion/co-champions; y – Championship game participant; Rankings from AP Poll

The 2001 Kansas State Wildcats football team represented Kansas State University in the 2001 NCAA Division I-A football season. The team's head coach was Bill Snyder. The Wildcats played their home games in KSU Stadium. 2001 saw the Wildcats finish with a record of 6–6, and a 3–5 record in Big 12 Conference play. The season culminated with a loss to Syracuse in the 2001 Insight.com Bowl.

== Schedule ==
Date	Time	Opponent	Rank	Site	TV	Result	Attendance	Source
September 8	5:30 p.m.	at USC*	No. 12	Los Angeles Memorial Coliseum; Los Angeles, CA	FSN	W 10–6	69,959	
September 22	1:10 p.m.	New Mexico State*	No. 12	KSU Stadium; Manhattan, KS		W 64–0	49,229	
September 29	11:00 a.m.	at No. 3 Oklahoma	No. 11	Oklahoma Memorial Stadium; Norman, OK (College GameDay)	ABC	L 37–38	75,862	
October 6	11:30 a.m.	Colorado	No. 12	KSU Stadium; Manhattan, KS (rivalry)	FSN	L 6–16	51,101	
October 13	7:00 p.m.	at Texas Tech	No. 24	Jones SBC Stadium; Lubbock, TX		L 19–38	46,536	
October 20	11:30 a.m.	Texas A&M		KSU Stadium; Manhattan, KS	FSN	L 24–31	49,935	
October 27	2:30 p.m.	Kansas^{†}		KSU Stadium; Manhattan, KS (rivalry)	PPV	W 40–6	50,101	
November 3	1:00 p.m.	at Iowa State		Jack Trice Stadium; Ames, IA (rivalry)		W 42–3	40,228	
November 10	2:30 p.m.	at No. 2 Nebraska		Memorial Stadium; Lincoln, NE (rivalry)	ABC	L 21–31	77,818	
November 17	1:10 p.m.	Louisiana Tech*		KSU Stadium; Manhattan, KS		W 40–7	47,069	
November 24	11:00 a.m.	Missouri		KSU Stadium; Manhattan, KS	FSN	W 24–3	43,810	
December 29	5:30 p.m.	vs. No. 18 Syracuse*		Bank One Ballpark; Phoenix, AZ (Insight.com Bowl)	ESPN	L 3–26	40,028	
*Non-conference game; ^{†}Homecoming; Rankings from AP Poll released prior to the game; All times are in Central time

== Game summaries ==
=== USC ===
	1	2	3	4	Total
No. 12 Wildcats	3	7	0	0	10
Trojans	0	0	6	0	6

=== At No. 3 Oklahoma ===
No. 11 Kansas State at No. 3 Oklahoma

Team	1	2	3	4	Total
No. 11 Wildcats	0	14	13	10	37
• No. 3 Sooners	14	14	7	3	38

- Date: September 29
- Location: Oklahoma Memorial Stadium, Norman, Oklahoma
- Game attendance: 75,862
- TV announcers (ABC): Brent Musburger (Play–by–play), Gary Danielson (Color), & Jack Arute (Sideline)

=== Colorado ===
Colorado at No. 12 Kansas State

Team	1	2	3	4	Total
• Buffaloes	7	0	6	3	16
No. 12 Wildcats	0	0	0	6	6

- Date: October 6
- Location: KSU Stadium, Manhattan, Kansas
- Game start: 12:30 CDT
- Game attendance: 51,101
- TV announcers (FSN): Drew Goodman, Dave Lapham, Jim Knox
- Source: Box score

=== At Texas Tech ===
No. 24 Kansas State at Texas Tech

Team	1	2	3	4	Total
No. 24 Wildcats	7	0	6	6	19
• Red Raiders	7	10	7	14	38

- Date: November 10
- Location: Memorial Stadium, Lincoln, Nebraska
- Game attendance: 46,536
- TV announcers (ABC): Brad Nessler (Play–by–play), Bob Griese (Color), & Lynn Swann (Sideline)

=== Texas A&M ===
	1	2	3	4	Total
Texas A&M	7	7	17	0	31
Kansas State	0	7	3	14	24

=== At No. 2 Nebraska ===
Kansas State at No. 2 Nebraska

Team	1	2	3	4	Total
Kansas State	0	14	0	7	21
• No. 2 Cornhuskers	0	13	15	3	31

- Date: November 10
- Location: Memorial Stadium, Lincoln, Nebraska
- Game attendance: 77,818
- TV announcers (ABC): Brad Nessler (Play–by–play), Bob Griese (Color), & Lynn Swann (Sideline)

== Roster ==
2001 Kansas State Wildcats football team roster
Players
Coaches
Offense

Pos.	#	Name	Class
OL	53	Nick Leckey	So
OL	64	Ryan Lilja	So
QB	3	Ell Roberson	So
RB	43	Darren Sproles	Fr
WR	8	Taco Wallace	Jr

Defense

Pos.	#	Name	Class
CB	23	Jerametrius Butler	Sr
LB	52	Ben Leber	Sr
FS	38	Jon McGraw	Jr
CB	4	Terence Newman	Jr
LB	56	Terry Pierce	Jr

Special teams

Pos.	#	Name	Class

Head coach

- Bill Snyder

Coordinators/assistant coaches

- Ron Hudson – Offensive Coordinator & quarterbacks
- Michael Smith – Running backs
- Greg Peterson – Wide receivers, passing game coordinator, & recruiting coordinator
- Matt Miller – Tight ends
- Paul Dunn – Offensive line
- Phil Bennett – Defensive Coordinator
- Mo Latimore – interior Defensive line
- Bob Fello – Defensive end & Special Teams Coordinator
- Jim Gush – Linebackers

Legend

- (C) Team captain
- (S) Suspended
- (I) Ineligible
- Injured
- Redshirt

== Statistics ==
=== Score by quarter ===
	1	2	3	4	Total
Kansas State	52	113	71	91	327
Opponents	42	50	61	26	179

=== Team ===
	KSU	Opp
Scoring	327	179
Points per game	29.7	16.3
First downs	239	155
Rushing	160	66
Passing	63	70
Penalty	16	19
Total offense	4,332	2,886
Avg per play	5.1	4.2
Avg per game	393.8	262.4
Fumbles-Lost	17-7	15-7
Penalties-Yards	93-721	80-630
Avg per game	65.5	57.3

	KSU	Opp
Punts-Yards	59-2,400	71-2,716
Avg per punt	40.7	38.3
Time of possession/Game	33:49	26:11
3rd down conversions	68/178	50/160
4th down conversions	15/28	3/14
Touchdowns scored	44	21
Field goals-Attempts	7-13	11-17
PAT-Attempts	32-40	18-20
Attendance	291,245	310,403
Games/Avg per Game	6/48,541	5/62,081

=== Offense ===
==== Rushing ====
Name	GP	Att	Gain	Loss	Net	Avg	TD	Long	Avg/G
Josh Scobey	11	240	1,298	35	1,263	5.3	15	45	114.8
Ell Roberson	10	142	806	163	643	4.5	9	43	64.3
Rock Cartwright	11	66	303	11	292	4.4	2	27	26.5
Joe Hall	10	39	253	2	251	6.4	3	61	25.1
Darren Sproles	6	28	217	7	210	7.5	1	38	35.0
Total	11	606	3,234	399	2,835	4.7	34	61	257.7
Opponents	11	364	1,401	340	1,061	2.9	6	63	96.5

==== Passing ====
Name	GP-GS	Effic	Att-Cmp-Int	Yds	TD	Lng	Avg/G	Pct.
Ell Roberson	10	90.46	136-54-8	855	4	72	85.5	39.7
Marc Dunn	9	94.23	112-55-8	635	4	47	70.6	49.1
Total	11	92.06	250-110-16	1,497	8	72	136.1	44.0
Opponents	11	95.50	320-152-18	1,825	11	75	165.9	47.5

==== Receiving ====
Name	GP	No.	Yds	Avg	TD	Long	Avg/G
Aaron Lockett	11	24	357	14.9	3	46	32.5
Ricky Lloyd	11	20	306	16.2	3	57	27.8
Total	11	110	1,497	13.6	8	72	136.1
Opponents	11	152	1,825	12.0	11	75	165.9
