= 2001 Texas Longhorns football team =

American college football season

2001 Texas Longhorns football

Big 12 South champion Holiday Bowl champion

Big 12 Championship Game, L 37–39 vs. Colorado

Holiday Bowl, W 47–43 vs. Washington
- Conference: Big 12 Conference
- South Division

Ranking
- Coaches: No. 5
- AP: No. 5
- Record: 11–2 (7–1 Big 12)
- Head coach: Mack Brown (4th season)
- Offensive coordinator: Greg Davis (4th season)
- Offensive scheme: Pro-style
- Defensive coordinator: Carl Reese (4th season)
- Base defense: 4–3
- Captains: Major Applewhite; Ahmad Brooks; D.D. Lewis
- Home stadium: Darrell K Royal–Texas Memorial Stadium

2001 Big 12 Conference football standings
	Conf.			Overall
Team	W		L	W		L
North Division
No. 9 Colorado xy$	7	–	1	10	–	3
No. 8 Nebraska x%	7	–	1	11	–	2
Iowa State	4	–	4	7	–	5
Kansas State	3	–	5	6	–	6
Missouri	3	–	5	4	–	7
Kansas	1	–	7	3	–	8
South Division
No. 5 Texas xy	7	–	1	11	–	2
No. 6 Oklahoma	6	–	2	11	–	2
Texas Tech	4	–	4	7	–	5
Texas A&M	4	–	4	8	–	4
Oklahoma State	2	–	6	4	–	7
Baylor	0	–	8	3	–	8
Championship: Colorado 39, Texas 37
$ – BCS representative as conference champion; % – BCS at-large representative; x – Division champion/co-champions; y – Championship game participant; Rankings from AP Poll

The 2001 Texas Longhorns football team represented the University of Texas at Austin as a member of the South Division of the Big 12 Conference during the 2001 NCAA Division I-A football season. The team was coached by head coach Mack Brown and played their home games at Darrell K Royal–Texas Memorial Stadium in Austin, Texas. The Horns compiled an overall record of 11–2, 7–1 in conference play, enough to win the South Division and a berth in the Big 12 Championship Game where they lost to Colorado 37–39. They were invited to the Holiday Bowl where they came back to beat Washington 47–43.

The Longhorns began the season ranked No. 5, their highest preseason ranking since 1983, with lopsided victories over New Mexico State, North Carolina, Houston, and Texas Tech before their showdown with defending national champions Oklahoma in Dallas. The game was a defensive battle, and untimately hinged on a crucial play in the 4th quarter. Down 3–7, Chris Simms and the Longhorns took over on their own three yard line. Oklahoma safety Roy Williams literally leapt over the offensive line to make contact with Simms the moment he released the ball, which fell into the arms of Sooner linebacker Teddy Lehman for a game sealing pick-six.

The loss dropped the Longhorns to No. 11 but they rattled off six straight conference victories to finish 7–1 in conference play. Oklahoma State's upset of Oklahoma secured Texas' South Division title and a rematch against Colorado in the Big 12 Championship game.

The Longhorns entered the Big 12 Championship game ranked #3. An upset loss by #2 Florida earlier in the game meant that Texas was almost certainly playing for a spot in the Rose Bowl for the BCS Championship. The game was the worst of Simms career, committing four turnovers including a 64-yard pick six in the first half. Simms exited the game with a fractured finger and backup Major Applewhite was able to cut the lead to 30-36 late but fell short after a roughing the punter penalty allowed the Buffaloes to take a 9-point lead.

The loss cost Texas an appearance in any of the four major BCS Bowls. Instead the Longhorns were invited to the Holiday Bowl in San Diego to play Washington. Applewhite started and, despite a sluggish start, led a dramatic 19-point comeback in the fourth quarter to win the game 47–43.

== Schedule ==
Date	Time	Opponent	Rank	Site	TV	Result	Attendance
September 1	6:00 p.m.	New Mexico State*	No. 5	Darrell K Royal–Texas Memorial Stadium; Austin, TX	FSN	W 41–7	82,856
September 8	11:00 a.m.	North Carolina*	No. 4	Darrell K Royal–Texas Memorial Stadium; Austin, TX	ABC	W 44–14	83,106
September 22	8:00 p.m.	at Houston*	No. 5	Robertson Stadium; Houston, TX	ESPN2	W 53–26	31,784
September 29	6:00 p.m.	Texas Tech	No. 5	Darrell K Royal–Texas Memorial Stadium; Austin, TX (Battle for the Chancellor's Spurs)	FSN	W 42–7	83,081
October 6	2:30 p.m.	vs. No. 3 Oklahoma	No. 5	Cotton Bowl; Dallas, TX (Red River Shootout) (College GameDay)	ABC	L 3–14	75,587
October 13	11:30 a.m.	at Oklahoma State	No. 11	Lewis Field; Stillwater, OK	FSN	W 45–17	47,390
October 20	2:30 p.m.	No. 14 Colorado	No. 9	Darrell K Royal–Texas Memorial Stadium; Austin, TX	ABC	W 41–7	83,156
October 27	1:00 p.m.	at Missouri	No. 7	Faurot Field; Columbia, MO		W 35–16	51,123
November 3	11:30 a.m.	at Baylor	No. 5	Floyd Casey Stadium; Waco, TX (rivalry)	FSN	W 49–10	40,451
November 10	11:30 a.m.	Kansas	No. 5	Darrell K Royal–Texas Memorial Stadium; Austin, TX		W 59–0	83,111
November 23	11:00 a.m.	at Texas A&M	No. 5	Kyle Field; College Station, TX (rivalry)	ABC	W 21–7	87,555
December 1	7:00 p.m	vs. No. 9 Colorado	No. 3	Texas Stadium; Irving, TX (Big 12 Championship Game)	ABC	L 37–39	65,675
December 28	7:30 p.m	vs. No. 21 Washington*	No. 9	Qualcomm Stadium; San Diego, CA (Holiday Bowl)	ESPN	W 47–43	60,548
*Non-conference game; Rankings from AP Poll released prior to the game; All times are in Central time

== Rankings ==
Ranking movements Legend: ██ Increase in ranking ██ Decrease in ranking ( ) = First-place votes
	Week																
Poll	Pre	1	2	3	4	5	6	7	8	9	10	11	12	13	14	15	Final
AP	5 (5)	5 (4)	4 (4)	5 (4)	5 (4)	5 (4)	11	9	7	5	5	5	5	3	10	9	5
Coaches Poll	6 (2)	6 (2)	6 (1)	6	5	5	11	8	7	5	5	5	5	3	10	9	5
BCS	Not released								6	5	5	6	6	3	7	7	Not released

== Roster ==
2001 Texas Longhorns football team roster
Players
Coaches
Offense

Pos.	#	Name	Class
QB	2	Chris Simms	Jr
WR	4	Roy Williams	So
QB	5	Chance Mock
RB	32	Cedric Benson	Fr
QB	11	Major Applewhite	Sr

Defense

Pos.	#	Name	Class
DE	40	Cory Redding	Jr

Special teams

Pos.	#	Name	Class

Head coach

- Mack Brown

Coordinators/assistant coaches

Legend

- (C) Team captain
- (S) Suspended
- (I) Ineligible
- Injured
- Redshirt
