= 2001 Texas Tech Red Raiders football team =

American college football season

2001 Texas Tech Red Raiders football

Alamo Bowl, L 16–19 vs. Iowa
- Conference: Big 12 Conference
- South Division
- Record: 7–5 (4–4 Big 12)
- Head coach: Mike Leach (2nd season)
- Offensive scheme: Air raid
- Defensive coordinator: Greg McMackin (2nd season)
- Base defense: 4–3
- Home stadium: Jones SBC Stadium

2001 Big 12 Conference football standings
	Conf.			Overall
Team	W		L	W		L
North Division
No. 9 Colorado xy$	7	–	1	10	–	3
No. 8 Nebraska x%	7	–	1	11	–	2
Iowa State	4	–	4	7	–	5
Kansas State	3	–	5	6	–	6
Missouri	3	–	5	4	–	7
Kansas	1	–	7	3	–	8
South Division
No. 5 Texas xy	7	–	1	11	–	2
No. 6 Oklahoma	6	–	2	11	–	2
Texas Tech	4	–	4	7	–	5
Texas A&M	4	–	4	8	–	4
Oklahoma State	2	–	6	4	–	7
Baylor	0	–	8	3	–	8
Championship: Colorado 39, Texas 37
$ – BCS representative as conference champion; % – BCS at-large representative; x – Division champion/co-champions; y – Championship game participant; Rankings from AP Poll

The 2001 Texas Tech Red Raiders football team represented Texas Tech University as a member of the Big 12 Conference during the 2001 NCAA Division I-A football season. In their second season under head coach Mike Leach, the Red Raiders compiled a 7–5 record (4–4 against Big 12 opponents), finished in a tie for third place in Southern Division of the Big 12, lost to Iowa in the 2001 Alamo Bowl, and outscored opponents by a combined total of 402 to 281. The team played its home games at Jones SBC Stadium in Lubbock, Texas.

== Schedule ==
Date	Time	Opponent	Site	TV	Result	Attendance	Source
September 8	7:00 p.m.	New Mexico*	Jones SBC Stadium; Lubbock, TX		W 42–30	48,924	
September 13		at UTEP*	Sun Bowl; El Paso, TX		Cancelled		
September 22	7:00 p.m.	vs. North Texas*	Texas Stadium; Irving, TX		W 42–14	20,852	
September 29	6:00 p.m.	at No. 5 Texas	Darrell K Royal–Texas Memorial Stadium; Austin, TX (rivalry)	FSN	L 7–42	83,081	
October 6	7:00 p.m.	Kansas^{†}	Jones SBC Stadium; Lubbock, TX		L 31–34 ^{2OT}	45,343	
October 13	7:00 p.m.	No. 24 Kansas State	Jones SBC Stadium; Lubbock, TX		W 38–19	46,536	
October 20	6:00 p.m.	at No. 3 Nebraska	Memorial Stadium; Lincoln, NE	FSN	L 31–41	77,838	
October 27	2:00 p.m.	at Baylor	Floyd Casey Stadium; Waco, TX (rivalry)		W 63–19	39,110	
November 3	1:00 p.m.	No. 24 Texas A&M	Jones SBC Stadium; Lubbock, TX (rivalry)	PPV	W 12–0	52,649	
November 10	1:00 p.m.	at Oklahoma State	Lewis Field; Stillwater, OK		W 49–30	32,332	
November 17	2:30 p.m.	No. 3 Oklahoma	Jones SBC Stadium; Lubbock, TX	ABC	L 13–30	52,008	
November 24	1:00 p.m.	Stephen F. Austin*	Jones SBC Stadium; Lubbock, TX		W 58–3	31,147	
December 29	2:30 p.m.	vs. Iowa*	Alamodome; San Antonio, TX (Alamo Bowl)	ESPN	L 16–19	65,232	
*Non-conference game; ^{†}Homecoming; Rankings from AP Poll released prior to the game; All times are in Central time

== Game summaries ==
=== New Mexico ===
	1	2	3	4	Total
Lobos	7	7	3	13	30
Red Raiders	3	18	7	14	42

=== At UTEP ===
	1	2	3	4	Total
Red Raiders	0	0	0	0	0
Miners	0	0	0	0	0

The game was initially scheduled to take place on September 13, but was then postponed following the September 11 attacks. The game was eventually canceled on September 21 when the two teams could not agree on a date to reschedule that would work for both. Texas Tech would eventually play Stephen F. Austin to make up for the lost game.

=== Vs. North Texas ===
	1	2	3	4	Total
Red Raiders	7	14	7	14	42
Mean Green	0	0	07	7	14

=== At Texas ===
	1	2	3	4	Total
Red Raiders	0	7	0	0	7
No. 5 Longhorns	14	7	14	7	42

=== Kansas ===
	1	2	3	4	OT	2OT	Total
Jayhawks	10	3	0	11	7	3	34
Red Raiders	7	10	7	0	7	0	31

The Red Raiders would not lose to the Jayhawks again until October 26, 2019, with Kansas defeating Texas Tech 37–34 in Lawrence.

=== Kansas State ===
	1	2	3	4	Total
No. 24 Wildcats	7	0	6	6	19
Red Raiders	7	10	7	14	38

=== At Nebraska ===
	1	2	3	4	Total
Red Raiders	13	15	3	0	31
No. 3 Cornhuskers	21	7	10	3	41

=== At Baylor ===
	1	2	3	4	Total
Red Raiders	21	28	7	7	63
Bears	0	6	7	6	19

=== Texas A&M ===
	1	2	3	4	Total
No. 24 Aggies	0	0	0	0	0
Red Raiders	0	3	3	6	12

=== At Oklahoma State ===
	1	2	3	4	Total
Red Raiders	7	14	14	14	49
Cowboys	3	7	7	13	30

=== Oklahoma ===
	1	2	3	4	Total
No. 3 Sooners	3	10	7	10	30
Red Raiders	3	0	7	3	13

=== Stephen F. Austin ===
	1	2	3	4	Total
Lumberjacks	0	0	0	3	3
Red Raiders	14	20	17	7	58

=== Vs. Iowa (Alamo Bowl) ===
	1	2	3	4	Total
Hawkeyes	3	7	3	6	19
Red Raiders	0	3	7	6	16

== Roster ==
2001 Texas Tech Red Raiders football team roster
Players
Coaches
Offense

Pos.	#	Name	Class
QB	16	Kliff Kingsbury	Jr
QB	4	B. J. Symons	Fr
QB	15	Sonny Cumbie	Fr
QB	12	Cody Hodges	Fr
RB	2	Ricky Williams	Sr
G	64	Cody Campbell	Fr
OL	77	Dylan Gandy	Fr
WR	82	Carlos Francis	So
WR	7	Trey Haverty	Fr
WR	27	Wes Welker	So

Defense

Pos.	#	Name	Class
DE	9	Aaron Hunt	Jr
DB	12	Joselio Hanson	Jr
DB	28	Ryan Aycock	So
LB	59	Preston Hartfield	Jr

Special teams

Pos.	#	Name	Class
K/P	18	Clinton Greathouse	Jr
K	32	Robert Treece	Jr

Head coach

- Mike Leach

Coordinators/assistant coaches

- Greg McMackin (Defensive coordinator)
- Sonny Dykes (WR)
- Dana Holgorsen (IWR)
- Dave Aranda (GA)

Legend

- (C) Team captain
- (S) Suspended
- (I) Ineligible
- Injured
- Redshirt
