= 2001 Baylor Bears football team =

American college football season

2001 Baylor Bears football
- Conference: Big 12 Conference
- South Division
- Record: 3–8 (0–8 Big 12)
- Head coach: Kevin Steele (3rd season)
- Offensive coordinator: Greg Meyer (3rd season)
- Offensive scheme: Pro-style
- Defensive coordinator: Brick Haley (3rd season)
- Base defense: 4–3
- Home stadium: Floyd Casey Stadium

2001 Big 12 Conference football standings
	Conf.			Overall
Team	W		L	W		L
North Division
No. 9 Colorado xy$	7	–	1	10	–	3
No. 8 Nebraska x%	7	–	1	11	–	2
Iowa State	4	–	4	7	–	5
Kansas State	3	–	5	6	–	6
Missouri	3	–	5	4	–	7
Kansas	1	–	7	3	–	8
South Division
No. 5 Texas xy	7	–	1	11	–	2
No. 6 Oklahoma	6	–	2	11	–	2
Texas Tech	4	–	4	7	–	5
Texas A&M	4	–	4	8	–	4
Oklahoma State	2	–	6	4	–	7
Baylor	0	–	8	3	–	8
Championship: Colorado 39, Texas 37
$ – BCS representative as conference champion; % – BCS at-large representative; x – Division champion/co-champions; y – Championship game participant; Rankings from AP Poll

The 2001 Baylor Bears football team represented Baylor University as a member of the South Division of the Big 12 Conference during the 2001 NCAA Division I-A football season. Led by third-year head coach Kevin Steele, the Bears compiled an overall record of 3–8 with a mark of 0–8 in conference play, placing last out of six teams in the Big 12's South Division. The team played home games at Floyd Casey Stadium in Waco, Texas.

The final game of the season, against Southern Illinois on November 24, replaced the originally scheduled game on September 15 against Minnesota, which was cancelled due to the September 11 attacks.

== Schedule ==
Date	Time	Opponent	Site	TV	Result	Attendance	Source
September 8	6:00 p.m.	Arkansas State*	Floyd Casey Stadium; Waco, TX		W 24–3	28,953	
September 22	6:00 p.m.	New Mexico*	Floyd Casey Stadium; Waco, TX		W 16–13 ^{OT}	38,396	
September 29	1:00 p.m.	at Iowa State	Jack Trice Stadium; Ames, IA		L 0–41	44,189	
October 6	1:00 p.m.	at No. 24 Texas A&M	Kyle Field; College Station, TX (Battle of the Brazos)		L 10–16	82,589	
October 13	1:00 p.m.	No. 4 Nebraska	Floyd Casey Stadium; Waco, TX		L 7–48	38,102	
October 20	2:00 p.m.	at No. 2 Oklahoma	Oklahoma Memorial Stadium; Norman, OK		L 17–33	75,499	
October 27	2:00 p.m.	Texas Tech^{†}	Floyd Casey Stadium; Waco, TX (rivalry)		L 19–63	39,110	
November 3	11:30 a.m.	No. 5 Texas	Floyd Casey Stadium; Waco, Texas (rivalry)	FSN	L 10–49	41,451	
November 10	1:00 p.m.	at Missouri	Faurot Field; Columbia, Missouri		L 24–41	46,611	
November 17	1:00 p.m.	Oklahoma State	Floyd Casey Stadium; Waco, TX		L 22–38	21,873	
November 24	12:00 p.m.	Southern Illinois*	Floyd Casey Stadium; Waco, TX		W 56–12	7,321	
*Non-conference game; ^{†}Homecoming; Rankings from AP Poll released prior to the game; All times are in Central time
