= Jeff Wolfert =

American football player (born 1985)

No. 6
- Position: Placekicker

Personal information
- Born: October 22, 1985 (age 41); Overland Park, Kansas, U.S.
- Listed height: 6 ft 2 in (1.88 m)
- Listed weight: 190 lb (86 kg)

Career information
- College: Missouri
- NFL draft: 2009: undrafted

Career history
- Omaha Nighthawks (2010); Cleveland Browns (2011–2012)*; Blacktips (2014)
- * Offseason or practice squad member only

Awards and highlights
- 2× First-team All-Big 12 (2007, 2008)

Jeff Wolfert (born October 22, 1985) is an American former football kicker. He made his professional debut with the Omaha Nighthawks of the United Football League (UFL). In three years as the Missouri Tigers' place-kicker, Wolfert was a perfect 185-for-185 on extra point attempts and set the school's single-season and career scoring records.

== Early life ==
Before enrolling in college, Wolfert's career as a kicker nearly came to an end as the result of injury. As an underclassmen at Blue Valley West High School in Kansas, Wolfert excelled in soccer and diving. As a senior, he won a spot on the football team as a kicker. In his first and only high school football game, Wolfert ended up breaking his hip trying to drive the football into the endzone on a kick-off.

He also played soccer and was on the swim team, and was a standout prep diver, finishing in the finals of the state championships multiple years and gaining other various accolades.

== College career ==
After graduating from high school, Wolfert enrolled at University of Missouri on a diving scholarship. He became an all-conference diver as a freshman, but was determined to play football again. He tried out for the team as a sophomore walk-on in 2006 and made the team. He was Missouri's starting place-kicker from 2006 to 2008.

In 2006, Wolfert won a spot on the team as a walk-on and proceeded to convert all 45 extra point attempts and go 18-of-20 on field goal attempts. In his first year as starter, Wolfert set University of Missouri single-season records for field goals (18), points by a kicker (99), consecutive PATs (45) and field-goal percentage (90%). In April 2007, Wolfert was rewarded for his 2006 performance with a full football scholarship.

In 2007, he set the all-time Missouri Tigers football single-season scoring record with 130 points on 21 field goals (21-of-25) and 67 extra points (67-of-67). In his first two years at Missouri, Wolfert compiled a perfect 112-for-112 record in extra point attempts. In 2007, Wolfert also helped lead his team to the Big 12 North championship, a #1 ranking in the BCS poll at the end of November 2007, and a berth in the Cotton Bowl.

In 2008, Wolfert completed his collegiate careers by scoring with 133 points, going 73-for-73 on extra point attempts and 20-of-27 on field goals.

In three years as the Tigers' place-kicker, he never missed an extra-point attempt (185-for-185) and broke the school's all-time scoring record. At the conclusion of his college career, Wolfert told an interviewer that his records were a tribute to his team:

"I think it's a testament to our offense. We're really powerful and always in the red zone, so when they've been short of touchdowns, I've been able to knock down three points. A lot of touchdowns, too, and extra points with them."

He was selected by Sports Illustrated in 2007 as an Honorable Mention player. He was also selected in 2007 as a first-team All-Big 12 player by the Associated Press, Dallas Morning News, Ft. Worth Star-Telegram, and Waco Tribune-Herald. In three years as the Tigers' kicker, Wolfert never missed an extra point. At the end of the 2007 season, USA Today also published a feature story on Wolfert, noting that his "extremely accurate right leg" had provided Missouri with the margin of victory in key games. When asked by the USA Today about his streak of 87 consecutive extra points without a miss, Wolfert said:

""It's in the back of my head, but I try not to think about it too much because I don't want to jinx it. I'm just thinking about the snap and the hold, and really just keeping my head down, because I know if I keep my head down good things are going to happen."

=== College Awards ===
- Lou Groza Award Semifinalist (2006)
- Hon. Men. All-Big 12 (Associated Press, Coaches) (2006)
- Team Walk-On Player of the Year (2006)
- 1st-Team Academic All-Big 12 (2006)
- Hon. Men. All-American (Sports Illustrated) (2007)
- 1st-Team All-Big 12 (Associated Press, Dallas Morning News, Ft. Worth Star-Telegram, Waco Tribune-Herald) (2007)
- 2nd-Team All-Big 12 (Coaches) (2007)
- Big 12 Special Teams Player of the Week (Nov. 26) (2007)
- 1st-Team Academic All-Big 12 (2007)
- Lou Groza Award Semifinalist (2008)
- 1st Team All-Big 12 (Associated Press, Coaches) (2008)
- Holds several Missouri school records- including single-season and career scoring records

== Professional career ==
Wolfert had a minicamp tryout with the Chicago Bears, but was not signed. He also had tryouts with the Kansas City Chiefs and the Atlanta Falcons. In 2010, he worked out with the New York Jets.

Wolfert was frustrated with not getting a chance in the NFL, and was actively pursuing a job. Seth Wickersham of ESPN attributed Wolfert's unemployment to a trend in the NFL in which teams valued kicking strength over accuracy. Wolfert mentioned that in each of his tryouts, the kicker liked the most was the one who could kick the highest and farthest, and coaches did not seem to care about accuracy. Saying of his quest for an NFL job, "They just keep saying, 'Keep knocking on the door. Your opportunity will come. Don't be discouraged.' That's kind of how it is. If you're willing to put forth the effort and the right offer comes in, hopefully you can make the best of it."

=== Omaha Nighthawks ===
Wolfert was a placekicker with the United Football League's Omaha Nighthawks in 2010. He finished the 2010 season as the UFL's most accurate kicker, converting 9 of 10 field goals (90% accuracy rate). He was also named to the 2010 All-www.ufl-football.com Team.

=== Cleveland Browns ===
On July 26, 2011, Wolfert signed with the Cleveland Browns. He was waived on August 28.

Wolfert signed a reserve/future contract with the Browns on January 3, 2012. He was waived on August 18, 2012.

== See also ==
- List of NCAA major college football yearly scoring leaders
