= Brian Smith (defensive end) =

American football player (born 1983)

No. 49
- Position: Defensive end

Personal information
- Born: September 16, 1983 (age 43); Denton, Texas, U.S.
- Listed height: 6 ft 3 in (1.91 m)
- Listed weight: 236 lb (107 kg)

Career information
- High school: Billy Ryan (Denton, Texas)
- College: Missouri (2002–2006)
- NFL draft: 2007: 4th round, 113th overall pick

Career history
- Jacksonville Jaguars (2007)

Awards and highlights
- 2× All-Big Twelve (2005–2006)

Brian Smith (born September 16, 1983) is an American former football defensive end. He was selected by the Jacksonville Jaguars in the fourth round of the 2007 NFL draft. He played college football at Missouri.

== Early life ==
Brian Smith graduated from Billy Ryan High School in Denton, Texas in 2002. He was named Defensive Player of the Year as a junior and senior. He was a two-time All-State selection and led the team to the state championship in 2001 under head coach Joey Florence. Smith recorded 160 tackles and 35 sacks as a senior. He posted 20 sacks as a junior.

== College career ==
Smith played his collegiate ball at the University of Missouri. Starting as a situational pass-rusher, by his junior year he had blossomed into the team's best defensive end. Although he was injured midway through his senior season, Smith finished his collegiate career as Missouri's all-time leader in sacks.

== Professional career ==
Smith was selected in the fourth round on the 2007 NFL draft by the Jacksonville Jaguars. He was placed on the PUP list during this rookie year. He was waived in June 2008, never playing a down for the Jaguars.
