= Jeff Handy =

American football player (born 1968)

No. 11
- Position: Quarterback

Personal information
- Listed height: 6 ft 3 in (1.91 m)
- Listed weight: 202 lb (92 kg)

Career information
- High school: Blue Springs (Blue Springs, Missouri)
- College: Missouri (1990–1994)

Jeff Handy is an American former college football quarterback who played for the Missouri Tigers.

== Early life ==
Handy played high school football at Blue Springs High School in Blue Springs, Missouri. As a senior in 1989, he completed 281 of 417 passes for 3,452 yards and 41 touchdowns. He set the national high school record for passing yards-per-game (345.2), single-season completions, and completions per game (28.1). Handy recorded 6,130 career yards.

== College career ==
Handy accepted an athletic scholarship to attend the University of Missouri and play college football for the Tigers. He redshirted the 1990 season and was a four-year letterman from 1991 to 1994. He was the backup to Phil Johnson in 1991, completing 48 of 89 passes (53.9%) for 565 yards, three touchdowns, and two interceptions. Handy made his first career start on October 17, 1992, against Oklahoma State after Johnson was benched. During the game, Handy completed 43 of 73 passes for 480 yards but Missouri lost 28–26. He broke Big Eight Conference single-game records in completions and passing attempts while tying the passing yardage record. He was named the Big Eight Offensive Player of the Week. He finished the 1992 season with 196 completions on 329 attempts (59.6%) for 2,463 yards, 13 touchdowns, and eight interceptions while also scoring one rushing touchdown. He led the Big Eight in completions, passing attempts, passing yards, passing touchdowns, and passing yards per game (246.3).

In 1993, Handy completed 174 of 291 passes (59.8%) for 1,901 yards, 11 touchdowns, and 12 interceptions while rushing for one touchdown. He had the highest completion percentage and interception total in the Big Eight. As a senior in 1994, he totaled 200 completions on 349 attempts (57.3%) for 2,030 yards, 12 touchdowns, and eight interceptions. He led the Big Eight in both completions and passing attempts. Handy finished his college career with school records in passing yards (6,959) and passing touchdowns (39).

== See also ==
- Missouri Tigers football statistical leaders
