= Bud Sasser =

American football player (born 1992)

No. 81
- Position: Wide receiver

Personal information
- Born: May 29, 1992 (age 34); Denton, Texas, U.S.
- Listed height: 6 ft 2 in (1.88 m)
- Listed weight: 210 lb (95 kg)

Career information
- High school: Billy Ryan (Denton)
- College: Missouri (2010–2014)
- NFL draft: 2015: 6th round, 201st overall pick

Career history
- St. Louis Rams (2015)*
- * Offseason or practice squad member only

Awards and highlights
- First-team All-SEC (2014)
- Stats at Pro Football Reference

Bud Sasser (born May 29, 1992) is an American former professional football wide receiver. He played college football at Missouri. He was selected by the St. Louis Rams in the sixth round of the 2015 NFL draft. On June 4, 2015, Sasser was waived by the Rams without ever officially signing his rookie contract, due to a pre-existing heart condition. On August 25, 2015, the Rams announced that they had hired Sasser as their external football affairs coordinator. Bud Sasser is currently attending Mizzou Law and has earned his MEd.
