= Bill Whitaker (American football) =

American football player (1959–2022)

No. 30, 55, 42
- Position: Safety

Personal information
- Born: January 18, 1959; Kansas City, Missouri, U.S.
- Died: October 2, 2022 (aged 63); Prairie Village, Kansas, U.S.
- Listed height: 6 ft 0 in (1.83 m)
- Listed weight: 182 lb (83 kg)

Career information
- High school: Rockhurst (Kansas City, Missouri)
- College: Missouri
- NFL draft: 1981: 7th round, 172nd overall pick

Career history
- Green Bay Packers (1981–1982); St. Louis Cardinals (1983–1984)

Awards and highlights
- First-team All-Big Eight (1980)

Career NFL statistics
- Games played: 39
- Games started: 0
- Fumble recoveries: 1
- Stats at Pro Football Reference

William Andrew Whitaker (January 18, 1959 – October 2, 2022) was an American professional football safety in the National Football League (NFL) who played for the Green Bay Packers and St. Louis Cardinals. Whitaker played collegiate ball for the University of Missouri before being selected 172nd overall by the Packers in the seventh round of the 1981 NFL draft. He played four seasons in the NFL and retired in 1984.

Whitaker died on October 2, 2022, at the age of 63.
