= J'Mon Moore =

American football player (born 1995)

No. 82
- Position: Wide receiver

Personal information
- Born: May 23, 1995 (age 31); Missouri City, Texas, U.S.
- Listed height: 6 ft 3 in (1.91 m)
- Listed weight: 205 lb (93 kg)

Career information
- High school: Elkins (Missouri City)
- College: Missouri
- NFL draft: 2018: 4th round, 133rd overall pick

Career history
- Green Bay Packers (2018); Cleveland Browns (2019–2020)*; Houston Texans (2020)*; Atlanta Falcons (2021)*; New Jersey Generals (2022); Pittsburgh Maulers (2023)*; New Jersey Generals (2023)
- * Offseason or practice squad member only

Awards and highlights
- Second-team All-SEC (2016)

Career NFL statistics
- Receptions: 2
- Receiving yards: 15
- Receiving touchdowns: 0
- Return yards: 102
- Stats at Pro Football Reference

J'Mon Milton Moore (born May 23, 1995) is an American former professional football player who was a wide receiver in the National Football League (NFL). He played college football for the Missouri Tigers, and was selected by the Green Bay Packers in the fourth round of the 2018 NFL draft. He was also a member of the NFL's Cleveland Browns, Houston Texans, and Atlanta Falcons, and the New Jersey Generals and Pittsburgh Maulers of the United States Football League (USFL).

== Early life ==
Moore attended Elkins High School in Missouri City, Texas. While there, he played high school football for the Knights. On April 17, 2012, he committed to the University of Missouri to play college football.

== College career ==
Moore played on the Missouri Tigers football team from 2013 to 2017 under head coaches Gary Pinkel and Barry Odom. He led the team in receiving his sophomore and senior season. His 1,012 yards as a junior led the Southeastern Conference (SEC). He finished his career with 158 receptions for 2,477 yards and 21 touchdowns.

== Professional career ==
External videos
- Moore's NFL Combine workout
- Moore gets drafted by Green Bay

Pre-draft measurables
Height	Weight	Arm length	Hand span	Wingspan	40-yard dash	10-yard split	20-yard split	20-yard shuttle	Three-cone drill	Vertical jump	Broad jump	Bench press
6 ft 2 5/8 in (1.90 m)	207 lb (94 kg)	32 7/8 in (0.84 m)	9 3/8 in (0.24 m)	6 ft 6 5/8 in (2.00 m)	4.49 s	1.64 s	2.60 s	4.04 s	6.56 s	38.0 in (0.97 m)	10 ft 0 in (3.05 m)	21 reps
All values from NFL Combine/Pro Day

=== Green Bay Packers ===
Moore was selected by the Green Bay Packers in the fourth round of the 2018 NFL draft with the 133rd overall pick. He signed his rookie contract on May 7, 2018. He recorded his first professional catch on October 15, 2018, in a Week 6 win over the San Francisco 49ers.

On August 31, 2019, Moore was waived by the Packers.

=== Cleveland Browns ===
Moore was signed to the practice squad of the Cleveland Browns on November 25, 2019. The Browns signed Moore to their reserve/futures list on December 30, 2019.

Moore was placed on the active/non-football injury list at the start of training camp on August 2, 2020, and activated from the list six days later. The Browns waived Moore on September 3, 2020.

=== Houston Texans ===
On December 2, 2020, the Houston Texans signed Moore to their practice squad. He signed a reserve/future contract on January 4, 2021. He was waived on March 16, 2021.

=== Atlanta Falcons ===
On July 30, 2021, Moore signed with the Atlanta Falcons. On August 14, 2021, Moore was waived/injured and placed on injured reserve. He was released on August 14.

=== New Jersey Generals (first stint) ===
Moore was selected by the New Jersey Generals of the United States Football League (USFL) with the second pick of the fourteenth round of the 2022 USFL draft. He was transferred to the team's inactive roster on April 22, 2022, due to a hamstring injury.

=== Pittsburgh Maulers ===
Moore had his USFL playing rights transferred to the Pittsburgh Maulers on October 20, 2022.

=== New Jersey Generals (second stint) ===
Moore re-signed with the Generals on April 19, 2023. He was placed on the team's suspended list on June 2, and released on June 9, 2023.

== Career statistics ==
=== NFL ===
Regular season statistics
Year	Team	Games		Receiving					Fumbles	
Year	Team	GP	GS	Rec	Yds	Avg	Lng	TD	FUM	Lost
2018	GB	12	0	2	15	7.5	10	0	1	0
Total		12	0	2	15	7.5	10	0	1	0

=== College ===
Year	Team	GP	Receiving				
Year	Team	GP	Rec	Yds	Avg	Lng	TD
2014	Missouri	1	2	33	16.5	17	0
2015	Missouri	11	29	350	12.1	32	3
2016	Missouri	12	62	1,012	16.3	82	8
2017	Missouri	13	65	1,082	16.6	71	10
Total		37	158	2,477	15.7	82	21
