= 2001 Missouri Tigers football team =

American college football season

2001 Missouri Tigers football
- Conference: Big 12 Conference
- North Division
- Record: 4–7 (3–5 Big 12)
- Head coach: Gary Pinkel (1st season)
- Offensive coordinator: Dave Christensen (1st season)
- Offensive scheme: Spread
- Defensive coordinator: Matt Eberflus (1st season)
- Base defense: 4–3
- Home stadium: Faurot Field

2001 Big 12 Conference football standings
	Conf.			Overall
Team	W		L	W		L
North Division
No. 9 Colorado xy$	7	–	1	10	–	3
No. 8 Nebraska x%	7	–	1	11	–	2
Iowa State	4	–	4	7	–	5
Kansas State	3	–	5	6	–	6
Missouri	3	–	5	4	–	7
Kansas	1	–	7	3	–	8
South Division
No. 5 Texas xy	7	–	1	11	–	2
No. 6 Oklahoma	6	–	2	11	–	2
Texas Tech	4	–	4	7	–	5
Texas A&M	4	–	4	8	–	4
Oklahoma State	2	–	6	4	–	7
Baylor	0	–	8	3	–	8
Championship: Colorado 39, Texas 37
$ – BCS representative as conference champion; % – BCS at-large representative; x – Division champion/co-champions; y – Championship game participant; Rankings from AP Poll

The 2001 Missouri Tigers football team represented the University of Missouri as a member of the Big 12 Conference during the 2001 NCAA Division I-A football season. Led by first-year head coach Gary Pinkel, the Tigers compiled an overall record of 4–7 with a mark of 3–5 in conference play, tying for fourth place in the Big 12's North Division. Missouri played home games at Faurot Field in Columbia, Missouri.

== Schedule ==
Date	Time	Opponent	Site	TV	Result	Attendance	Source
September 1	6:30 pm	Bowling Green*	Faurot Field; Columbia, MO		L 13–20	51,039	
September 8	6:30 pm	Southwest Texas State*	Faurot Field; Columbia, MO		W 40–6	51,689	
September 29	11:30 am	No. 4 Nebraska	Faurot Field; Columbia, MO	FSN	L 3–36	64,204	
October 6	7:00 pm	at Oklahoma State	Lewis Field; Stillwater, OK		W 41–38 ^{3OT}	44,050	
October 13	1:00 pm	Iowa State	Faurot Field; Columbia, MO (rivalry)		L 14–20	50,671	
October 20	1:00 pm	at Kansas	Memorial Stadium; Lawrence, KS (Border War)		W 38–34	38,500	
October 27	1:00 pm	No. 7 Texas	Faurot Field; Columbia, MO		L 16–35	51,123	
November 3	2:00 pm	at No. 25 Colorado	Folsom Field; Boulder, CO		L 24–38	45,942	
November 10	1:00 pm	Baylor	Faurot Field; Columbia, MO		W 41–24	46,611	
November 24	11:00 am	at Kansas State	KSU Stadium; Manhattan, KS	FSN	L 3–24	43,810	
December 1	10:00 am	at Michigan State*	Spartan Stadium; East Lansing, MI	ESPN2	L 7–55	72,823	
*Non-conference game; Rankings from AP Poll released prior to the game; All times are in Central time

== Roster ==
2001 Missouri Tigers football team roster
Players
Coaches
Offense

Pos.	#	Name	Class
WR	12	Justin Gage	Jr
QB	14	Kirk Farmer	Jr
C	70	A. J. Ricker	So

Defense

Pos.	#	Name	Class

Special teams

Pos.	#	Name	Class

Head coach

- Gary Pinkel

Coordinators/assistant coaches

Legend

- (C) Team captain
- (S) Suspended
- (I) Ineligible
- Injured
- Redshirt
