= DeMontie Cross =

American football player and coach

Biographical details
- Born: 1974 (age 51–52); St. Louis, Missouri, U.S.
- Education: Missouri

Playing career
- 1994–1996: Missouri
- Position: Free Safety

Coaching career (HC unless noted)
- 1998–1999: Missouri (OLB)
- 2000: Sam Houston State (DB)
- 2001–2005: Iowa State (OLB)
- 2006–2010: Buffalo Bills (Asst.)
- 2011: Wisconsin (S/ST)
- 2012: Kansas (LB)
- 2013–2015: TCU (co-DC/LB)
- 2016–2017: Missouri (DC)
- 2018–2020: TCU (director of player personnel)

Accomplishments and honors

Awards
- Second-team All-Big Eight (1995)

DeMontie E. Cross (born 1974) is a former football player and coach. He was the defensive coordinator of the University of Missouri football team.

== Biography ==
Cross is a graduate of Hazelwood East High School in St. Louis County, Missouri and the University of Missouri. While at Missouri, he played on the football team as a free safety and was named second-team All-Big Eight in 1995 and second-team All-Big 12 in 1996. Cross has two children.

== Coaching career ==
Cross began his college coaching career at his alma mater. He served as the outside linebackers coach from 1998 to 1999. In 2000, he served as the defensive backfield coach with the Sam Houston State Bearkats. From 2001 to 2005, he was the outside linebackers coach and special teams coordinator of the Iowa State Cyclones. Cross joined the staff of the Buffalo Bills in 2006. He first served as a defensive and special teams assistant before being promoted assistant linebackers coach and special teams coordinator, serving in those positions for three seasons. Cross spent his final season with the Bills as the inside linebackers coach.

In 2016, Cross was selected by new Missouri head coach, Barry Odom, to become the defensive coordinator. Mid-season, Cross was stripped of his play calling duties by Odom.

In 2018, Cross returned to TCU as director of player personnel.
