= Kirk Farmer =

American football player (born 1979)

Profile
- Position: Quarterback

Personal information
- Born: August 27, 1979 (age 47); Jefferson City, Missouri, U.S.
- Listed height: 6 ft 5 in (1.96 m)
- Listed weight: 218 lb (99 kg)

Career information
- College: Missouri
- NFL draft: 2003: undrafted

Career history
- St. Louis Rams (2003); Kansas City Chiefs (2004)*; Frankfurt Galaxy (2004)
- * Offseason or practice squad member only

Kirk Farmer (born August 27, 1979) is an American former football quarterback. He played college football for the Missouri Tigers from 1999 to 2002. He was signed by the St. Louis Rams as an Undrafted free agent in 2003. He also played for the Kansas City Chiefs and the Frankfurt Galaxy.

== Early life ==
Farmer attended Jefferson City High School along with future All-American, and Missouri teammate, Justin Smith. He passed for 770 yards, ran for 673 and accounted for 31 touchdowns in 1997 as Jefferson City won the state 5A championship while also a regular on Jefferson City's basketball team that was ranked as high as No. 4 in the state. Farmer also earned all state honors in golf recording a final round of 68 at the MSHAA Boys' State Championship. The round was the third lowest in MSHAA State Championship history at the time.

== College career ==
Farmer played with the Missouri Tigers from 1999 to 2002. His best season came in 2001, recording the then 7th most yards of total offense in Tigers history with 1,976 yards despite starting only 9 games. Injuries sidelined him in his senior season.

== Professional career ==
=== St. Louis Rams ===
Farmer was not selected in the 2003 NFL draft, but was signed by the St. Louis Rams as an Undrafted free agent. Initial reports revealed he was impressing the Rams with his arm, even leading then head coach Mike Martz to say Farmer has the strongest arm of any quarterback he’s ever worked with.

=== Kansas City Chiefs ===
Farmer was picked up the following year by the Kansas City Chiefs on January 27, 2004.

=== Frankfurt Galaxy ===
He was later allocated to the Frankfurt Galaxy of NFL Europe where he spent the rest of the year. In 2015 Farmer and his family were inducted into the Missouri Sports Hall of Fame.

== Business ==
After football, Farmer joined his family's company, Farmer Companies, where they own and operate construction material related businesses.
