= T. J. Moe =

American football player (born 1989)

No. 84, 87
- Position: Wide receiver

Personal information
- Born: October 14, 1990 (age 36); O'Fallon, Missouri, U.S.
- Listed height: 6 ft 0 in (1.83 m)
- Listed weight: 200 lb (91 kg)

Career information
- High school: Fort Zumwalt West
- College: Missouri
- NFL draft: 2013: undrafted

Career history
- New England Patriots (2013); St. Louis Rams (2014)*
- * Offseason or practice squad member only

Awards and highlights
- Second-team All-Big 12 (2010)
- Stats at Pro Football Reference

Taylor Jacob Moe (born October 14, 1990) is an American former professional football wide receiver. He was signed by the New England Patriots as an undrafted free agent out of Missouri in 2013. He was also a member of the St. Louis Rams.

== Professional career ==
Pre-draft measurables
Height	Weight	Arm length	Hand span	40-yard dash	10-yard split	20-yard split	20-yard shuttle	Three-cone drill	Vertical jump	Broad jump	Bench press
5 ft 11 1/2 in (1.82 m)	204 lb (93 kg)	30 1/8 in (0.77 m)	9 3/4 in (0.25 m)	4.60 s	1.56 s	2.63 s	3.96 s	6.53 s	36.0 in (0.91 m)	10 ft 0 in (3.05 m)	26 reps
All values from NFL Combine/Pro Day

After Moe tore his Achilles tendon during the Patriots' offseason training activities, the Patriots designated him as "waived/injured." He was released on March 10, 2014.

Moe signed with the St. Louis Rams on May 5, 2014, but was released in the first round of cuts.

== Radio ==
Moe is a cohost of The Hardline, a sports talk radio program on St. Louis based 590 The Fan KFNS (AM).

Moe is a frequent contributor to 'Fearless with Jason Whitlock' on Blaze Media.
