= Henry Josey =

American gridiron football player (born 1991)

No. 33, 38
- Position: Running back

Personal information
- Born: September 25, 1991 (age 35); Angleton, Texas, U.S.
- Listed height: 5 ft 8 in (1.73 m)
- Listed weight: 194 lb (88 kg)

Career information
- High school: Angleton (TX)
- College: Missouri
- NFL draft: 2014: undrafted

Career history
- Philadelphia Eagles (2014)*; Jacksonville Jaguars (2014)*; Minnesota Vikings (2014); Toronto Argonauts (2015–2016); Ottawa Redblacks (2017)*
- * Offseason or practice squad member only

Awards and highlights
- First-team All-Big 12 (2011)
- Stats at Pro Football Reference

Henry Josey (born September 25, 1991) is an American former football player. He played college football at Missouri.

== Early life ==
Josey is from Angleton, Texas. His father, Henry Neal, set a national high school record in the 100-meter dash in 1990. Josey attended Angleton High School, where he began his football career as a linebacker in 2007. As a junior, he moved to the running back position and gained 1,267 rushing yards and scored 20 touchdowns. As a senior in 2009, he gained 1,369 yards rushing and scored 15 touchdowns.

Also a standout track & field athlete, Josey earned a second-place finish in the 100-meters at the 2010 Region 3-4A Meet, recording a career-best time of 10.50 seconds. He also competed as a long jumper, he got a personal-best mark of 6.48 meters at the 2009 Rice Bayou Classic, placing 6th.

== College career ==
=== 2010 season ===
As a freshman for the 2010 Missouri Tigers football team, Josey gained 112 yards and scored three touchdowns (including a 62-yard touchdown run) in the season opener against McNeese State. Over the course of the 2010 season, he totaled 437 rushing yards and five touchdowns on 76 carries for an average of 4.8 yards per carry.

=== 2011 season ===
As a sophomore, Josey became the starting running back for the 2011 Missouri Tigers football team. In the third week of the season, Josey gained 263 rushing yards and scored three touchdowns on 14 carries against Western Illinois. He reached the 263 yard mark in the first half and did not play in the second half. The following week, he rushed for 133 yards and a touchdown on 14 carries against the No. 1 ranked Oklahoma Sooners.

During the 2011 regular season, Josey totaled 1,168 rushing yards on 145 carries for an average of 8.1 yards per carry. He ranked second in the NCAA Football Bowl Subdivision in yards per carry. He also ranked 12th in the Football Bowl Subdivision with an average of 116.8 rushing yards per game. His 2011 season ended short due to a severe knee injury.

=== 2012 season ===
Josey missed spring football practice in 2012. Although he participated in pre-season practice with the team in August 2012, he did not play in any games during the season.

=== 2013 season ===
Josey returned to play in all 14 games in 2013, rushing for 1,166 yards on 174 carries with 16 touchdowns. He finished his career with 2,771 yards on 395 carries, a Mizzou-best 7.0 yards per carry (minimum 300 attempts). After the season, he announced that he would forgo his senior season and enter the 2014 NFL draft.

== Professional career ==
Pre-draft measurables
Height	Weight	40-yard dash	10-yard split	20-yard split	20-yard shuttle	Three-cone drill	Vertical jump	Broad jump	Bench press
5 ft 8 in (1.73 m)	194 lb (88 kg)	4.43 s	1.52 s	2.47 s	4.13 s	7.07 s	34.5 in (0.88 m)	9 ft 10 in (3.00 m)	20 reps
All values from NFL Combine

Josey signed as an undrafted free agent with the Philadelphia Eagles on May 10, 2014. While Josey had a strong pre-season, he was released by the Eagles on August 29, 2014.

He was signed to the Jacksonville Jaguars practice squad on August 31, 2014.

On December 24, 2014, Josey signed with the Minnesota Vikings off the Jaguars' practice squad.

On May 26, 2015, Josey signed with the Toronto Argonauts in the Canadian Football League (CFL). In the 2015 season Josey carried the ball 16 times gaining 30 yards on the ground; he also caught four passes for 15 yards.

Josey signed with the Ottawa Redblacks (CFL) on September 25, 2017. He was released by the club on April 12, 2018.

== See also ==
- List of college football yearly rushing leaders
