= Gardner Edgerton High School =

High school in Gardner, Kansas, USA

Location
- 425 N. Waverly; Gardner, Kansas 66030; United States
- 38°49′01″N 94°56′21″W

Information
- School type: Public, High School
- Motto: Home of the Trailblazers
- Principal: Frank Bell
- Teaching staff: 101.50 (FTE)
- Enrollment: 1,766 (2023-2024)
- Student to teacher ratio: 17.40
- Colors: Blue; White; Black
- Athletics conference: Sunflower League
- Mascot: Trailblazer
- Website: www.usd231.com/o/gardner-edgerton-hs

Gardner Edgerton High School (commonly called GE or GEHS) is a fully accredited public high school located in Gardner, Kansas, United States. It is the only high school in the Gardner–Edgerton USD 231 school district. The school colors are blue and white.

GEHS is a member of the Kansas State High School Activities Association and offers a variety of sports programs. Athletic teams compete in the 6A division and are known as the Trailblazers or Blazers for short. Extracurricular activities are also offered in the form of performing arts, school publications, and clubs.

== History ==
GEHS' current campus was built in 2000. Prior to this location, the high school was located where the current Wheatridge Middle School is located. The original high school was established in 1966. The transition in 2000 marked a massive upgrade for the Gardner Edgerton School District (USD 231). In 2004, an expansion increased the school capacity from 1,200 to 1,600 students.

District Activities Complex, has facilities for soccer, as well as baseball and softball practice fields. In 2006, the school added a wrestling facility and a multi-purpose building.

== State Championships ==
State Championships
Season	Sport	Number of Championships	Year
Fall	Football	2	2023, 2024
Total		2	

== Notable alumni ==
- John Means, professional baseball player for the Cleveland Guardians
- Bubba Starling, former professional baseball player for the Kansas City Royals
