= Styrofoam =

Trademarked brand for extruded polystyrene

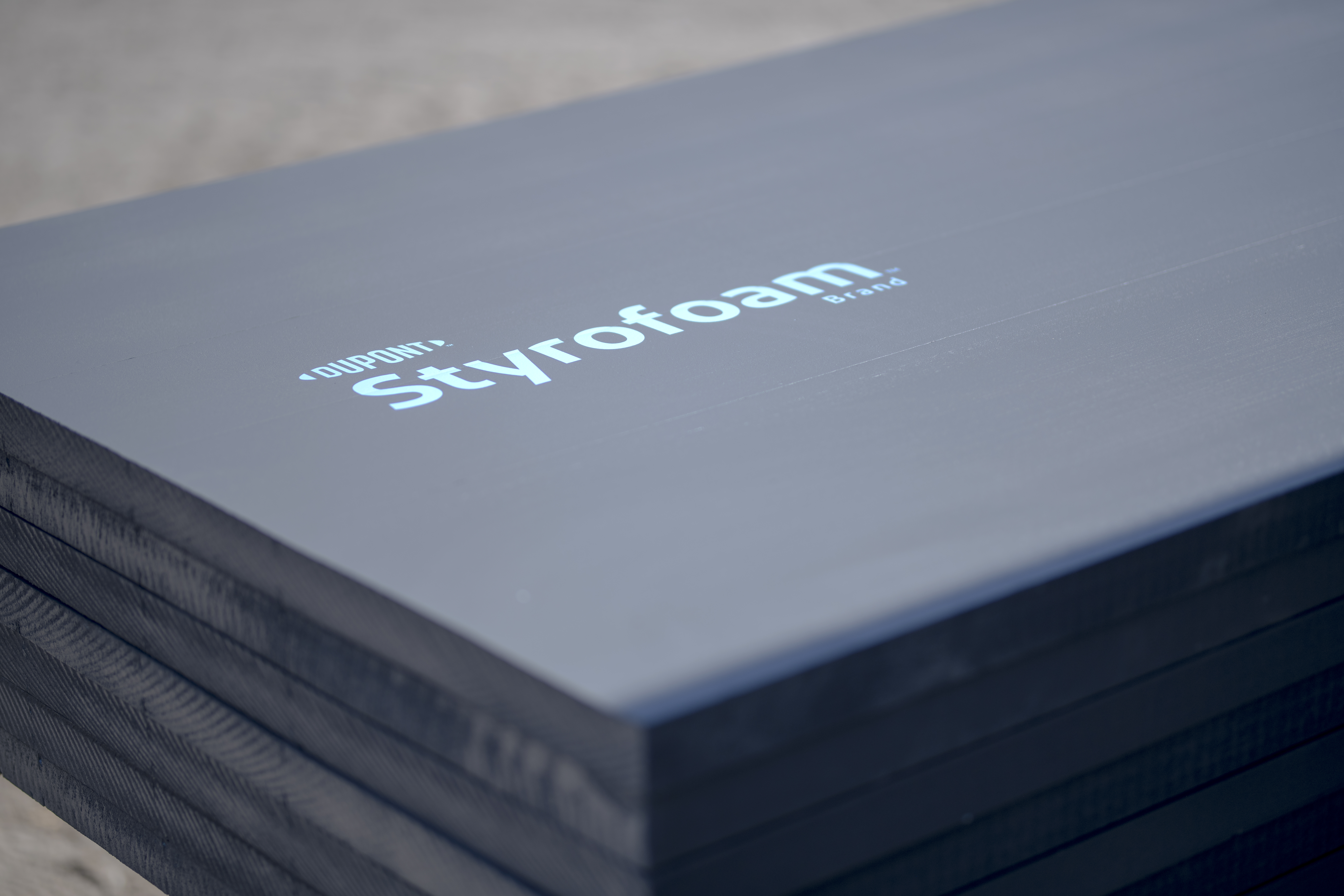
Styrofoam insulation extruded polystyrene foam (XPS), owned and manufactured by DuPont

Styrofoam is a brand of closed-cell extruded polystyrene foam (XPS), manufactured to provide continuous building insulation board used in walls, roofs, and foundations as thermal insulation and as a water barrier. This material is light blue in color and is owned and manufactured by DuPont. DuPont also has produced a line of green and white foam shapes for use in crafts and floral arrangements.

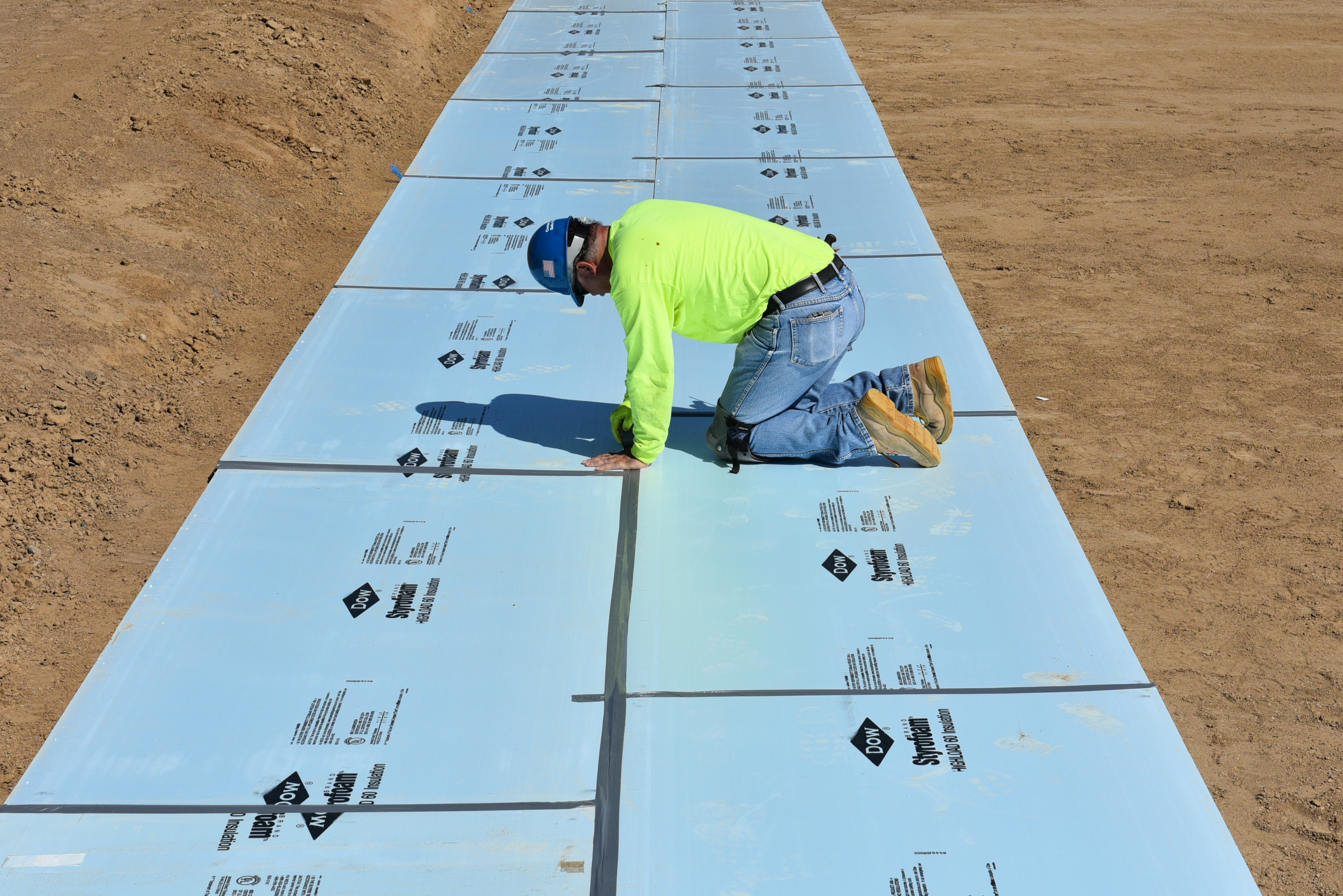
Worker installing Styrofoam frost protection insulation board.

The term styrofoam is argued to have become a genericized trademark; as it is often used in the United States as a colloquial term to refer to expanded (not extruded) polystyrene foam (EPS). Outside the United States, EPS is most commonly referred to as simply "polystyrene" with the term "styrofoam" being used in its capacity to describe all forms of extruded polystyrene, not just the Dupont brand itself. Polystyrene (EPS) is often used in food containers, coffee cups, and as cushioning material in packaging. Styrofoam is, however, a denser material than EPS and is more commonly suited to tasks such as thermal insulation.

Additionally, it is moderately soluble in many organic solvents, cyanoacrylate, and the propellants and solvents of spray paint.

== History ==
Model lifting a Styrofoam log in a Dow Chemical advertisement

In the 1940s, researchers, originally at Dow's Chemical Physics Lab, led by Ray McIntire, found a way to make foamed polystyrene. They rediscovered a method first used by Swedish inventor Carl Georg Munters, and obtained an exclusive license to Munters's patent in the United States. Dow found ways to adapt Munters's method to make large quantities of extruded polystyrene as a closed cell foam that resists moisture. The patent on this adaptation was filed in 1947.

== Uses ==
Styrofoam has a variety of uses. Styrofoam is composed of 98% air, making it lightweight and buoyant.

DuPont produces Styrofoam building materials, including varieties of building insulation sheathing and pipe insulation. The claimed R-value of Styrofoam insulation is approximately 5 °F⋅ft^{2}⋅h/BTU for 1 inch thick sheet.

Styrofoam can be used under roads and other structures to prevent soil disturbances due to freezing and thawing.

DuPont also produces Styrofoam blocks and other shapes for use by florists and in craft products. DuPont insulation Styrofoam has a distinctive blue color; Styrofoam for craft applications is available in white and green.

== Environmental issues ==
The EPA and International Agency for Research on Cancer reported limited evidence that styrene is carcinogenic for humans and experimental animals, meaning that there is a positive association between exposure and cancer and that causality is credible, but that other explanations cannot be confidently excluded. Again, styrofoams are not easily recycled which ends up polluting the environment and this has raised a high concern among advocates of the environment, the likes of EPA bringing a ban to it.

== See also ==
- List of generic and genericized trademarks
- National Inventors Hall of Fame
- Resin identification code
- Structural insulated panel
