= Ray McIntire =

American engineer and inventor (1918–1996)

Otis Ray McIntire
- Born: August 24, 1918; Gardner, Kansas, US
- Died: February 2, 1996 (aged 77)
- Known for: Inventor of Styrofoam
- Spouse: Elizabeth McIntire

Otis Ray McIntire (24 August 1918 – 2 February 1996) was an American inventor and engineer. After graduating from the University of Kansas with a BSc degree in engineering in 1940, he went to work as a research engineer for The Dow Chemical Company. During World War II, when rubber was in short supply, McIntire's work focused on developing a rubber-like substance that could be used as a flexible insulator. In an experiment, in which he combined styrene with isobutylene, he created a unique material that was solid yet flexible due to the tiny bubbles formed by isobutylene within the styrene.

McIntire had invented foam polystyrene, more commonly known by its brand name, Styrofoam, that was 30 times lighter and more flexible than solid polystyrene. It was also inexpensive and moisture resistant.

McIntire remained at The Dow Chemical Company for his entire career. He was promoted to research director, and later worked in the company’s consumer and venture capital divisions. In 1981, he retired as Dow’s director of technology and acquisition.

McIntire died in 1996 from interstitial fibrosis. In March 2008, McIntire was inducted to the National Inventors Hall of Fame.
