= Gardner, Kansas =

- City
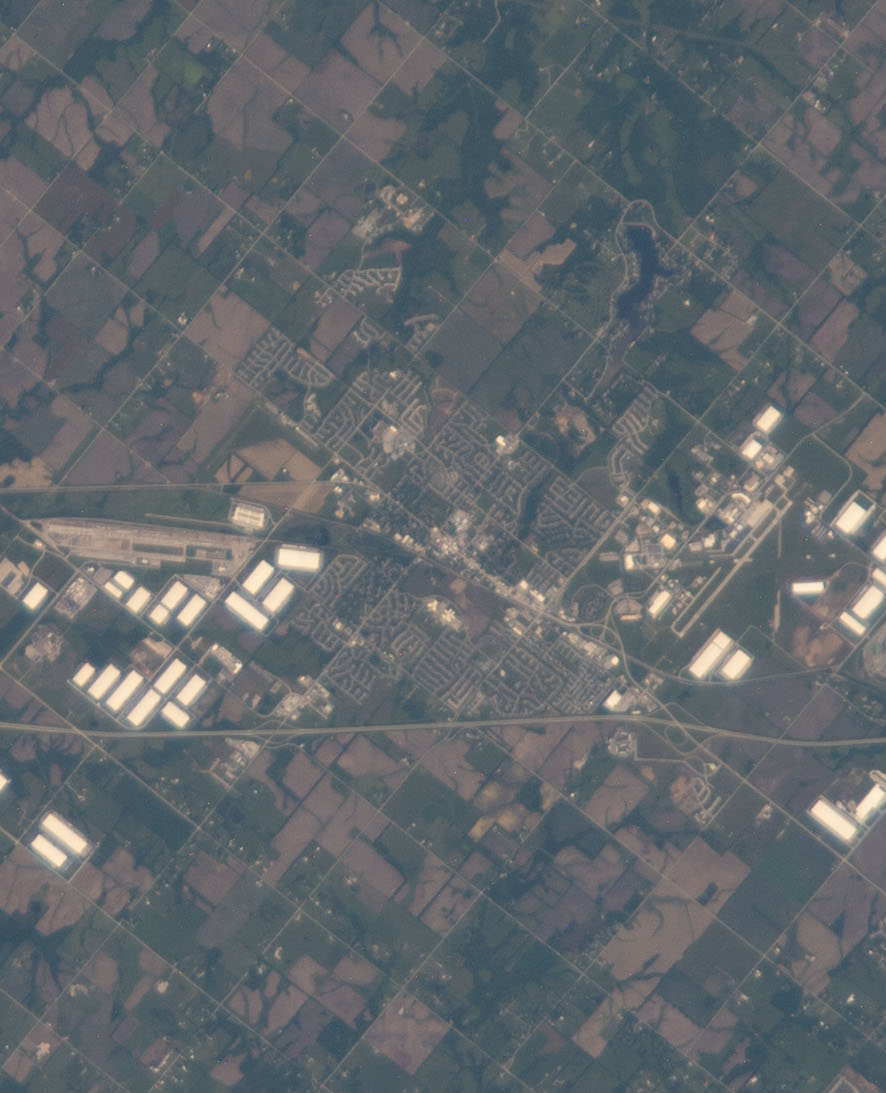
- Space view from ISS Expedition 73 (June 2025)

- Flag

- Location within Johnson County and Kansas
- Interactive map of Gardner, Kansas
- Coordinates: 38°48′41″N 94°55′41″W
- Country: United States
- State: Kansas
- County: Johnson
- Founded: 1857
- Incorporated: 1887
- Named for: Henry Gardner

Government
  - Type: Mayor–Council
  - Mayor: Todd Winters
  - City Administrator: Jim Pruetting

Area
  - Total: 10.32 sq mi (26.72 km^{2})
  - Land: 10.27 sq mi (26.61 km^{2})
  - Water: 0.039 sq mi (0.10 km^{2})
- Elevation: 1,063 ft (324 m)

Population (2020)
  - Total: 23,287
  - Estimate (2024): 25,836
  - Density: 2,267/sq mi (875.1/km^{2})
- Time zone: UTC-6 (CST)
  - Summer (DST): UTC-5 (CDT)
- ZIP Codes: 66030-66031
- Area code: 913
- FIPS code: 20-25425
- GNIS ID: 485580
- Website: gardnerkansas.gov

Gardner is a city in Johnson County, Kansas, United States. As of the 2020 census, the population of the city was 23,287. It is located within the Kansas City metropolitan area.

== History ==
Gardner was founded where the Santa Fe Trail and the Oregon/California Trails divided. The Santa Fe Trail sent travelers southwest through Santa Fe and Albuquerque toward Los Angeles and San Diego. The Oregon/California Trails bore west for a few miles before turning north toward the Kansas River valley, followed the Big Blue River into present-day Nebraska, followed the Platte River west, and ultimately split in present-day Wyoming, Idaho or Utah.

Gardner was founded as a Free-Stater settlement in 1857. Settled primarily by emigrants from Massachusetts, it was named for Henry Gardner, then governor of Massachusetts. Four years after its establishment, it became the first community in Johnson County—and perhaps the first in the state—to experience an attack by Confederate forces.

The first post office in Gardner was established in 1858.

== Geography ==
According to the United States Census Bureau, the city has a total area of 10.21 square miles (26.44 km^{2}), of which 10.16 square miles (26.31 km^{2}) is land and 0.05 square miles (0.13 km^{2}) is water. The most notable body of water in Gardner is Gardner Lake, on the north side of town, off South Gardner Road and 151st Street. The headwaters of Kill Creek, which runs north joining with the Kansas River in De Soto, are also in Gardner.

=== Climate ===
The climate in this area is characterized by hot, humid summers and generally mild to cool winters. According to the Köppen Climate Classification system, Gardner has a humid subtropical climate, abbreviated "Cfa" on climate maps.

Climate data for Gardner, Kansas (New Century AirCenter) (1991–2020 normals, extremes 1945–1970, 1997–present)
Month	Jan	Feb	Mar	Apr	May	Jun	Jul	Aug	Sep	Oct	Nov	Dec	Year
Record high °F (°C)	74 (23)	81 (27)	87 (31)	92 (33)	95 (35)	104 (40)	114 (46)	111 (44)	107 (42)	96 (36)	81 (27)	74 (23)	114 (46)
Mean maximum °F (°C)	64.0 (17.8)	67.9 (19.9)	77.7 (25.4)	84.3 (29.1)	89.1 (31.7)	94.7 (34.8)	99.7 (37.6)	99.8 (37.7)	93.8 (34.3)	86.0 (30.0)	73.7 (23.2)	65.1 (18.4)	101.7 (38.7)
Mean daily maximum °F (°C)	39.4 (4.1)	44.1 (6.7)	56.0 (13.3)	66.0 (18.9)	75.4 (24.1)	84.7 (29.3)	89.4 (31.9)	88.2 (31.2)	79.7 (26.5)	67.5 (19.7)	54.0 (12.2)	43.0 (6.1)	65.6 (18.7)
Daily mean °F (°C)	29.8 (−1.2)	34.1 (1.2)	44.9 (7.2)	54.8 (12.7)	64.9 (18.3)	74.5 (23.6)	78.8 (26.0)	77.4 (25.2)	68.6 (20.3)	56.5 (13.6)	43.8 (6.6)	33.6 (0.9)	55.1 (12.8)
Mean daily minimum °F (°C)	20.1 (−6.6)	24.1 (−4.4)	33.8 (1.0)	43.6 (6.4)	54.4 (12.4)	64.3 (17.9)	68.2 (20.1)	66.5 (19.2)	57.5 (14.2)	45.5 (7.5)	33.6 (0.9)	24.2 (−4.3)	44.7 (7.1)
Mean minimum °F (°C)	0.0 (−17.8)	5.0 (−15.0)	14.1 (−9.9)	26.9 (−2.8)	39.9 (4.4)	51.5 (10.8)	58.5 (14.7)	55.9 (13.3)	43.5 (6.4)	28.2 (−2.1)	17.0 (−8.3)	5.2 (−14.9)	−3.6 (−19.8)
Record low °F (°C)	−12 (−24)	−15 (−26)	−7 (−22)	18 (−8)	31 (−1)	43 (6)	49 (9)	47 (8)	36 (2)	23 (−5)	4 (−16)	−11 (−24)	−15 (−26)
Average precipitation inches (mm)	1.05 (27)	1.50 (38)	2.31 (59)	3.76 (96)	5.08 (129)	5.26 (134)	4.21 (107)	3.95 (100)	3.74 (95)	3.27 (83)	1.91 (49)	1.50 (38)	37.54 (954)
Average precipitation days (≥ 0.01 in)	5.5	6.4	9.4	11.0	13.4	11.1	9.3	9.4	9.0	8.9	6.1	5.7	105.2
Source: NOAA

== Demographics ==
Historical population
Census	Pop.	Note	%±
1880	203		—
1890	515		153.7%
1900	475		−7.8%
1910	514		8.2%
1920	514		0.0%
1930	493		−4.1%
1940	510		3.4%
1950	676		32.5%
1960	1,619		139.5%
1970	1,839		13.6%
1980	2,392		30.1%
1990	3,191		33.4%
2000	9,396		194.5%
2010	19,123		103.5%
2020	23,287		21.8%
2025 (est.)	26,154		12.3%
U.S. Decennial Census; 2010-2020

=== Racial and ethnic composition ===
Gardner city, Kansas – Racial and ethnic composition Note: the US Census treats Hispanic/Latino as an ethnic category. This table excludes Latinos from the racial categories and assigns them to a separate category. Hispanics/Latinos may be of any race.
Race / Ethnicity (NH = Non-Hispanic)	Pop 2000	Pop 2010	Pop 2020	% 2000	% 2010	% 2020
White alone (NH)	8,719	16,444	17,820	92.79%	85.99%	76.52%
Black or African American alone (NH)	109	553	890	1.16%	2.89%	3.82%
Native American or Alaska Native alone (NH)	42	81	85	0.45%	0.42%	0.37%
Asian alone (NH)	99	366	401	1.05%	1.91%	1.72%
Native Hawaiian or Pacific Islander alone (NH)	1	8	32	0.01%	0.04%	0.14%
Other race alone (NH)	5	16	114	0.05%	0.08%	0.49%
Mixed race or Multiracial (NH)	140	471	1,567	1.49%	2.46%	6.73%
Hispanic or Latino (any race)	281	1,184	2,378	2.99%	6.19%	10.21%
Total	9,396	19,123	23,287	100.00%	100.00%	100.00%

=== 2020 census ===
As of the 2020 census, 23,287 people, 8,005 households, and 5,938 families resided in Gardner. The population density was 1,996.8 per square mile (771.0/km^{2}). There were 8,294 housing units at an average density of 711.2 per square mile (274.6/km^{2}); 3.5% of housing units were vacant, the homeowner vacancy rate was 1.3%, and the rental vacancy rate was 5.1%.

98.9% of residents lived in urban areas, while 1.1% lived in rural areas.

Of the 8,005 households, 47.7% had children under the age of 18 living in them. Of all households, 56.1% were married-couple households, 15.2% were households with a male householder and no spouse or partner present, and 21.6% were households with a female householder and no spouse or partner present. About 20.5% of all households were made up of individuals, and 6.9% had someone living alone who was 65 years of age or older. The average household size was 3.0 and the average family size was 3.3.

32.1% of residents were under the age of 18; 7.6% were from 18 to 24; 31.5% were from 25 to 44; 20.3% were from 45 to 64; and 8.5% were 65 years of age or older. The median age was 32.6 years. For every 100 females there were 98.2 males, and for every 100 females age 18 and over there were 95.4 males age 18 and over.

Racial composition as of the 2020 census
Race	Number	Percent
White	18,449	79.2%
Black or African American	907	3.9%
American Indian and Alaska Native	130	0.6%
Asian	415	1.8%
Native Hawaiian and Other Pacific Islander	32	0.1%
Some other race	834	3.6%
Two or more races	2,520	10.8%

=== 2016–2020 American Community Survey ===
The percent of those with a bachelor's degree or higher was estimated to be 20.9% of the population. The 2016–2020 5-year American Community Survey estimates show that the median household income was $78,193 (with a margin of error of +/- $4,899) and the median family income was $86,859 (+/- $4,392). Males had a median income of $49,402 (+/- $4,503) versus $30,995 (+/- $3,086) for females. The median income for those above 16 years old was $39,662 (+/- $2,267). Approximately, 4.3% of families and 6.0% of the population were below the poverty line, including 9.6% of those under the age of 18 and 6.9% of those ages 65 or over.

=== 2010 census ===
As of the census of 2010, there were 19,123 people, 6,644 households, and 4,938 families living in the city. The population density was 1,889.6 inhabitants per square mile (729.6/km^{2}). There were 7,300 housing units at an average density of 721.3 per square mile (278.5/km^{2}). The racial makeup of the city was 89.7% White, 3.0% African American, 0.5% Native American, 1.9% Asian, 1.8% from other races, and 3.0% from two or more races. Hispanic or Latino of any race were 6.2% of the population.

There were 6,644 households, of which 49.7% had children under the age of 18 living with them, 58.9% were married couples living together, 10.3% had a female householder with no husband present, 5.1% had a male householder with no wife present, and 25.7% were non-families. 20.1% of all households were made up of individuals, and 5% had someone living alone who was 65 years of age or older. The average household size was 2.85 and the average family size was 3.31.

The median age in the city was 30 years. 33.2% of residents were under the age of 18; 6.6% were between the ages of 18 and 24; 37.7% were from 25 to 44; 17.1% were from 45 to 64; and 5.3% were 65 years of age or older. The gender makeup of the city was 49.9% male and 50.1% female.

== Economy ==
BNSF Railway built a refueling plant and office in Edgerton which is 3 miles from western Gardner. It opened in May 2013 and employs about 200.

=== Top employers ===
According to the city's 2024 Annual Comprehensive Financial Report, Gardner's top employers are:

Rank	Employer	Employees in 2024	Employees in 2015	2024 Share	2015 Share
1	Unified School District No. 231	▲926	800	▲21.75%	19.15%
2	Walmart	▲225	250	▼5.29%	5.98%
3	Cosentino's Price Chopper	▲191	130	▲4.49%	3.11%
4	Meadowbrook Rehabilitation Hospital	▲189	174	▲4.44%	4.17%
5	Excelligence Learning Corp	▲175	-	▲4.11%	-
6	City of Gardner	▲165	135	▲3.88%	3.23%
7	First Student	▲140	-	▲3.29%	-
8	Olathe Health Gardner/Edgerton	▲45	-	▲1.06%	-
9	Olathe Ford RV Salves, Inc.	▲42	-	▲0.99%	-
10	OMNI Systems/D.O.T. Label, Inc. (ITW)	▼41	87	▼0.96%	2.08%

== Government ==
The mayor of Gardner is Todd Winters, who was sworn in on December 6, 2021. The city council is made up of five (5) at-large members, each of whom serve rotating 4-year terms.

=== Law enforcement ===
The Gardner Police Department is the primary law enforcement agency for the City of Gardner. As of February of 2025 it employs 38 sworn officers. The Gardner Police Department provides patrol services for the city, investigations, and animal control services. The Gardner Police Department is contracted with USD 231 to provide school resource officer services.

== Education ==
Gardner is part of the USD 231 school district. Located in Gardner are six out of the seven elementary schools (Edgerton Elementary is the only school in the district not located in Gardner). These include Gardner Elementary, Sunflower Elementary, Madison Elementary, Nike Elementary, Grand Star Elementary, and Moonlight Elementary. The district also has three middle schools, Wheatridge, Trail Ridge, and Pioneer Ridge, and one high school (Gardner Edgerton High School) all located in Gardner.

=== Library ===
The Johnson County Library maintains a branch in Gardner.

== Notable people ==
Notable individuals who were born in and/or have lived in Gardner include:

- Danedri Herbert, journalist and politician
- Ray McIntire (1918–1996), engineer, inventor
- John Means (1993– ), baseball pitcher
- Bubba Starling (1992– ), baseball center fielder

== See also ==
- California Trail
- Oregon Trail
- Santa Fe Trail
