= Bubba Starling =

American baseball player (born 1992)

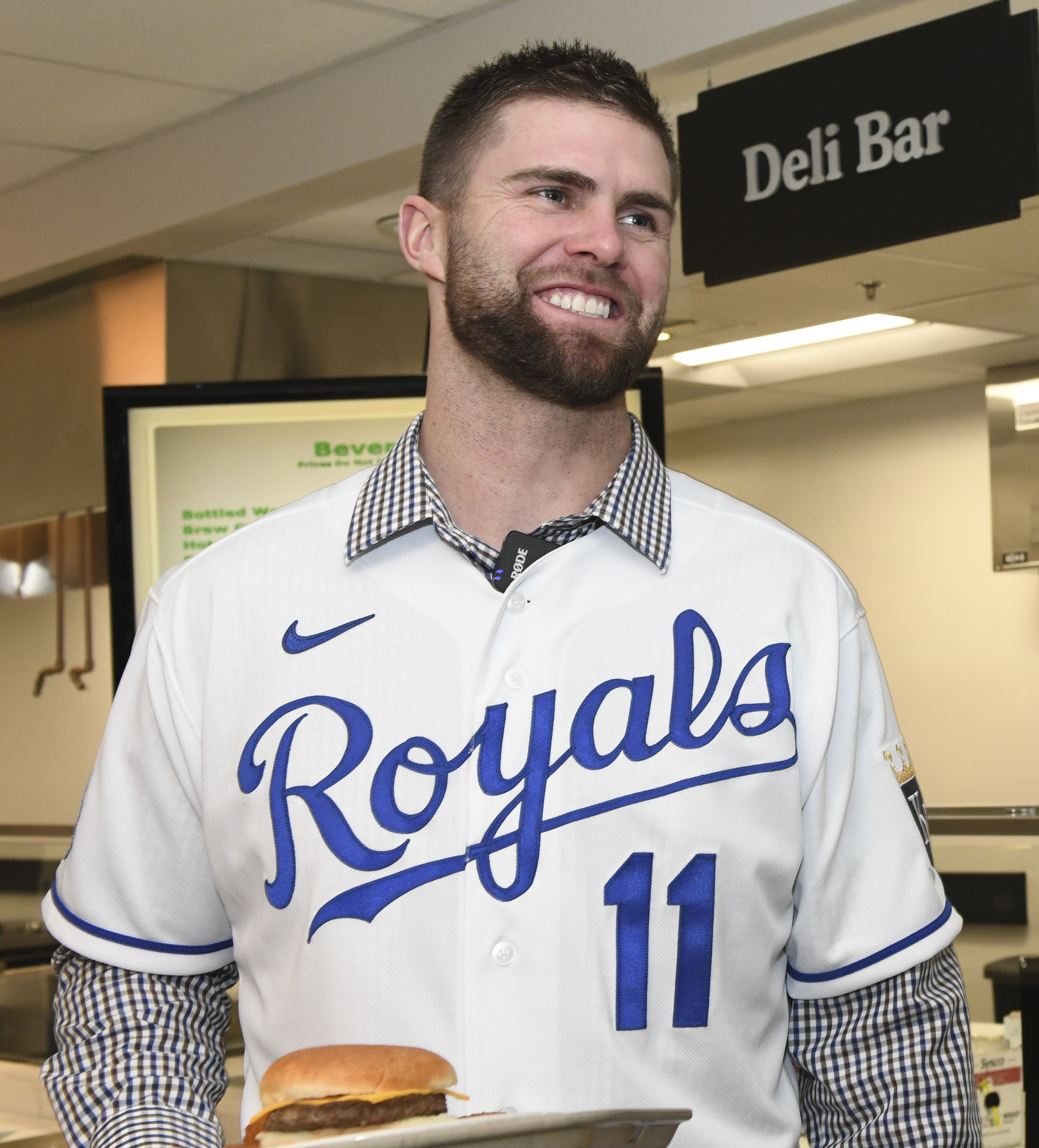
- Starling at Whiteman Air Force Base in 2020
- Outfielder
- Born: August 3, 1992 (age 33); Gardner, Kansas, U.S.
- Batted: Right Threw: Right

MLB debut
- July 12, 2019, for the Kansas City Royals

Last MLB appearance
- September 22, 2020, for the Kansas City Royals

MLB statistics
- Batting average: .204
- Home runs: 5
- Runs batted in: 17
- Stats at Baseball Reference

Teams
- Kansas City Royals (2019–2020)

Career highlights and awards
- Thomas A. Simone Award (2010)
Medals
Men's baseball
Representing United States
Olympic Games
Silver medal – second place	2020 Tokyo	Team USA

Derek "Bubba" Starling (born August 3, 1992) is an American former professional baseball outfielder. He spent his entire career in Major League Baseball (MLB) with the Kansas City Royals organization.

== Amateur career ==
Starling graduated in 2011 from Gardner Edgerton High School in Gardner, Kansas. Starling was an All-State selection in three different sports at Gardner-Edgerton. He earned first team Top 11 picks as a quarterback in all classifications in Kansas two years in a row. He was rated as high as the No. 6 quarterback in the class of 2011 and No. 112 in the nation for high school football recruits and was also touted as the No. 1 ranked baseball recruit in the nation.

Starling started three years at quarterback for Gardner-Edgerton's football team, and during his junior year he led the Trailblazers to the 2009 Kansas 5A Sub-State Championship game, which was won by the Hutchinson Salthawks. After his senior year, he was considered one of the top quarterback prospects in the nation. Starling accepted a scholarship to play both football and baseball for the Nebraska Cornhuskers.

Starling was also a member of Kansas's high school All-State team in basketball.

== Professional career ==
The Kansas City Royals of Major League Baseball (MLB) selected Starling with the fifth overall selection in the 2011 Major League Baseball draft. He had widely been considered to be the most athletic prospect in the draft. On August 14, 2011, Starling signed with the Royals, forgoing his commitment to Nebraska. He received a then team-record $7.5 million signing bonus, spread over three years. Starling’s signing bonus was also, at the time, the second-largest in draft history, as well as the largest-ever bonus and most guaranteed money given to a high school player taken in the draft. Starling was represented by agent Scott Boras.

Starling made his professional debut in 2012 with the Burlington Royals and spent the whole season there, batting .275 with ten home runs and 33 RBIs in 53 games. In 2013, he played for the Lexington Legends where he compiled a .241 batting average with 13 home runs and 63 RBIs in 125 games, and in 2014, he played with the Wilmington Blue Rocks where he batted .218 with nine home runs and 54 RBIs in 132 games. Starling spent 2015 with both Wilmington and the Northwest Arkansas Naturals, compiling a combined .269 batting average with 12 home runs and 44 RBIs in 103 total games between both clubs.

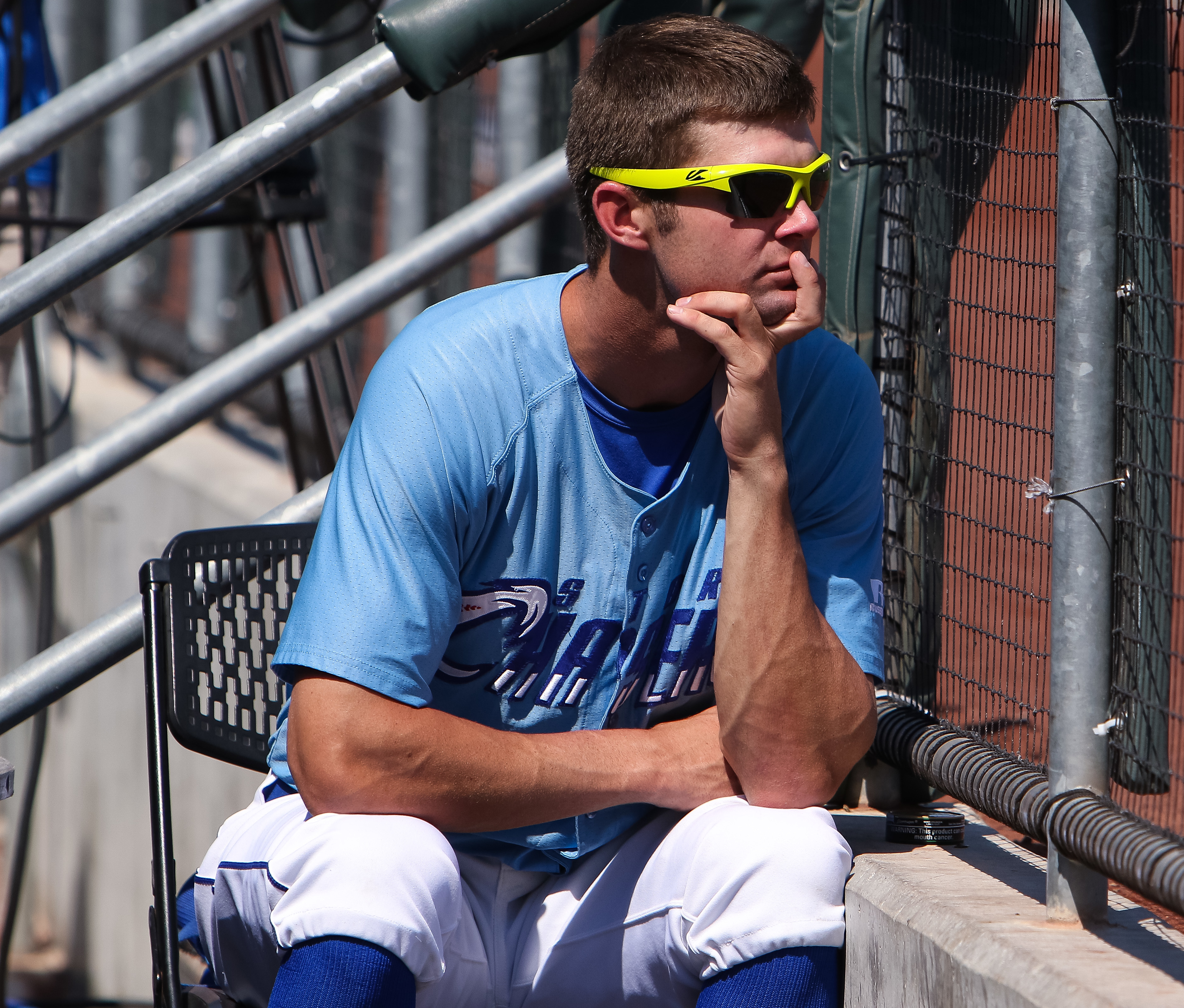
Starling with the Omaha Storm Chasers in 2016

The Royals added Starling to their 40-man roster after the 2015 season. He began 2016 with Northwest Arkansas and was promoted to the AAA Omaha Storm Chasers in July. In 109 games between the two teams he batted .183 with seven home runs and 40 RBIs. Starling spent 2017 with Omaha where he slashed .248/.303/.381 with seven home runs and 21 RBIs in 80 games.

Starling began 2018 with Omaha, but was sidelined for most of the season with injuries. Between his time in Omaha and rehabilitation stints with the Arizona League Royals and the Idaho Falls Chukars, Starling appeared in only 20 total games, hitting .296 with four homers and 11 RBIs. On November 30, 2018, the Royals non-tendered Starling, making him a free agent. On December 17, the Royals re-signed Starling to a minor league deal. He was again assigned to Omaha to start the 2019 season. He was selected to play on the Pacific Coast League in the 2019 Triple-A All-Star Game.

=== Kansas City Royals ===
On July 12, 2019, the Royals selected Starling's contract and promoted him to the major leagues. He made his major league debut that night versus the Detroit Tigers. Starling collected his first career hit, an RBI single, off Matthew Boyd, the following night. On July 21, 2019, Starling hit his first career MLB home run off Cleveland Indians closer Brad Hand. He hit .215 in 56 games.

Overall with the 2020 Kansas City Royals, Starling batted .169 with one home run and 5 RBIs in 35 games. On December 2, Starling was non-tendered by the Royals. On December 12, 2020, Starling re-signed with the Royals on a minor league contract.

Starling announced his retirement from professional baseball via Facebook on October 26, 2021.

== International career ==
On July 2, 2021, Starling was named to the roster for the United States national baseball team for the 2020 Summer Olympics, contested in 2021 in Tokyo. The team went on to win silver, falling to Japan in the gold-medal game.

== Personal life ==
Starling was born and raised in Gardner, Kansas, where his mother had also been a three-sport athlete at Gardner-Edgerton High School. His father had played basketball at nearby Wellsville High School.
