= Vacuum forming =

Thermoforming of plastic material

A simple visualization of the forming process

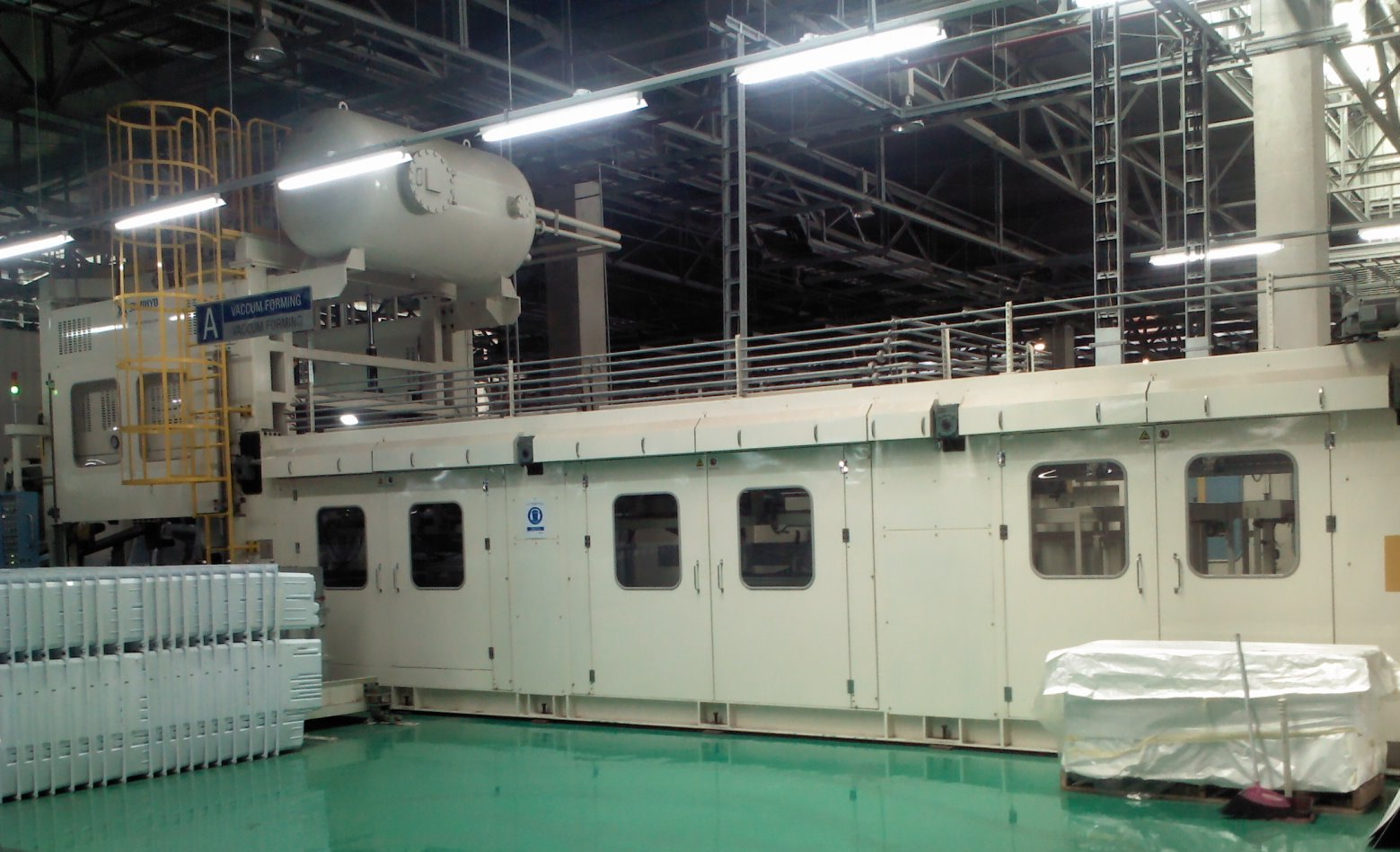
Vacuum forming machine to produce inner liner/food liner of refrigerator

Vacuum forming is a simplified version of thermoforming, where a sheet of plastic in various forms of high-impact polystyrene sheet (HIPS) for low impact products, or ABS for bathroom shower trays, and HDPE for exterior vehicle parts, plus various other types of vacuum formable materials) is heated to a forming temperature, stretched onto a single-surface mould, and forced against the mould by a vacuum. This process can be used to form plastic into permanent objects such as turnpike signs and protective covers. Normally draft angles are present in the design of the mould (a recommended minimum of 3°) to ease removal of the formed plastic part from the mould.

Relatively deep parts can be formed if the formable sheet is mechanically or pneumatically stretched prior to bringing it into contact with the mold surface and applying the vacuum.

Suitable materials for use in vacuum forming are conventionally thermoplastics. The most common and easiest to use thermoplastic is high impact polystyrene sheeting (HIPS). This is molded around a wood, structural foam or cast or machined aluminium mold, and can form to almost any shape. This high impact material is hygienic and capable of retaining heat and its shape when warm water is applied and is commonly used to package taste and odor sensitive products. Vacuum forming is also appropriate for transparent materials such as acrylic, which are widely used in applications for aerospace such as passenger cabin window canopies for military fixed wing aircraft and compartments for rotary wing aircraft. Vacuum forming is often used in low-level technology classes for an easy way to mold.

Modern vacuum-forming equipment is based on a series of US patents awarded in 1950, 1964, and 1974.

== Typical applications ==
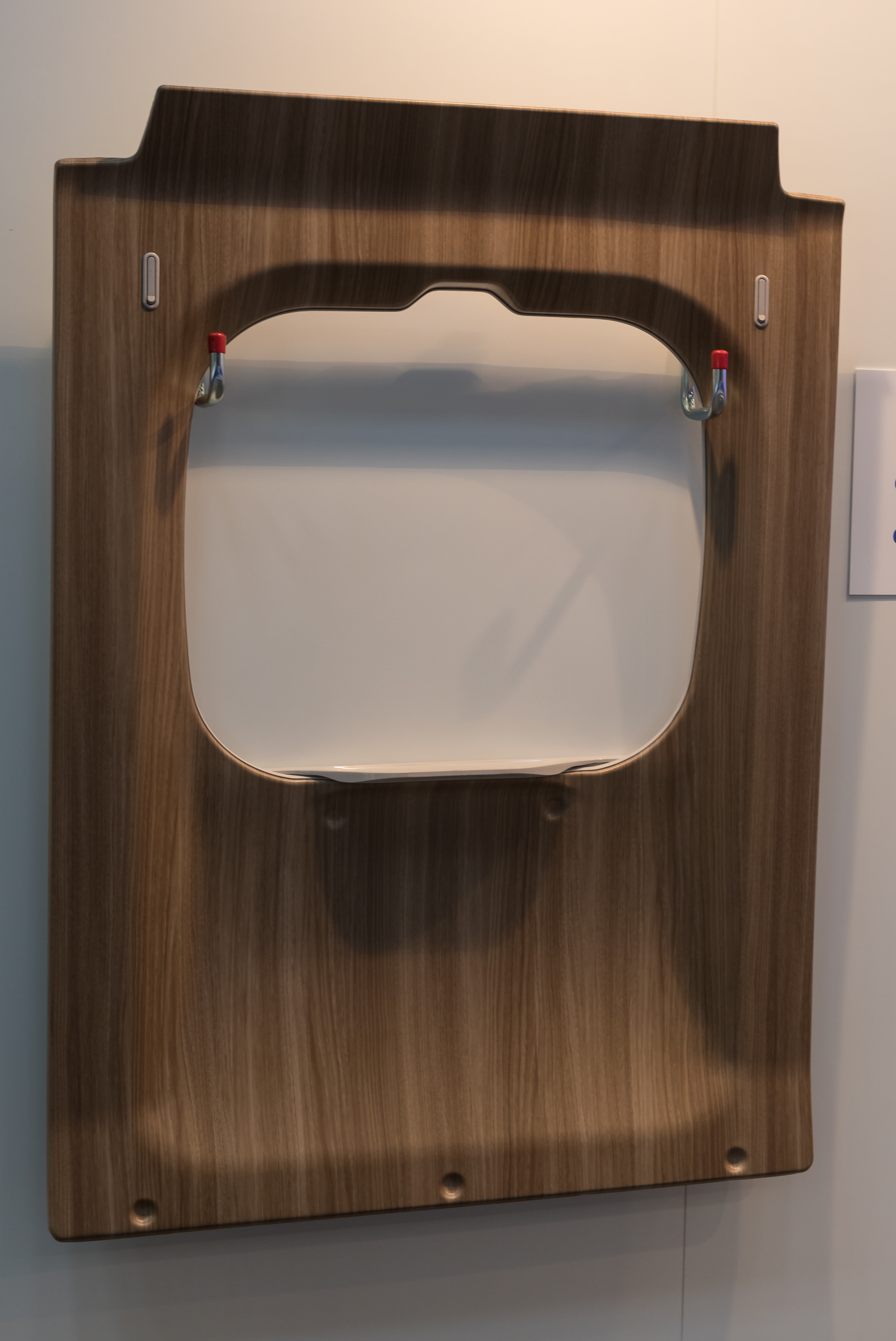
Vacuum formed vehicle part

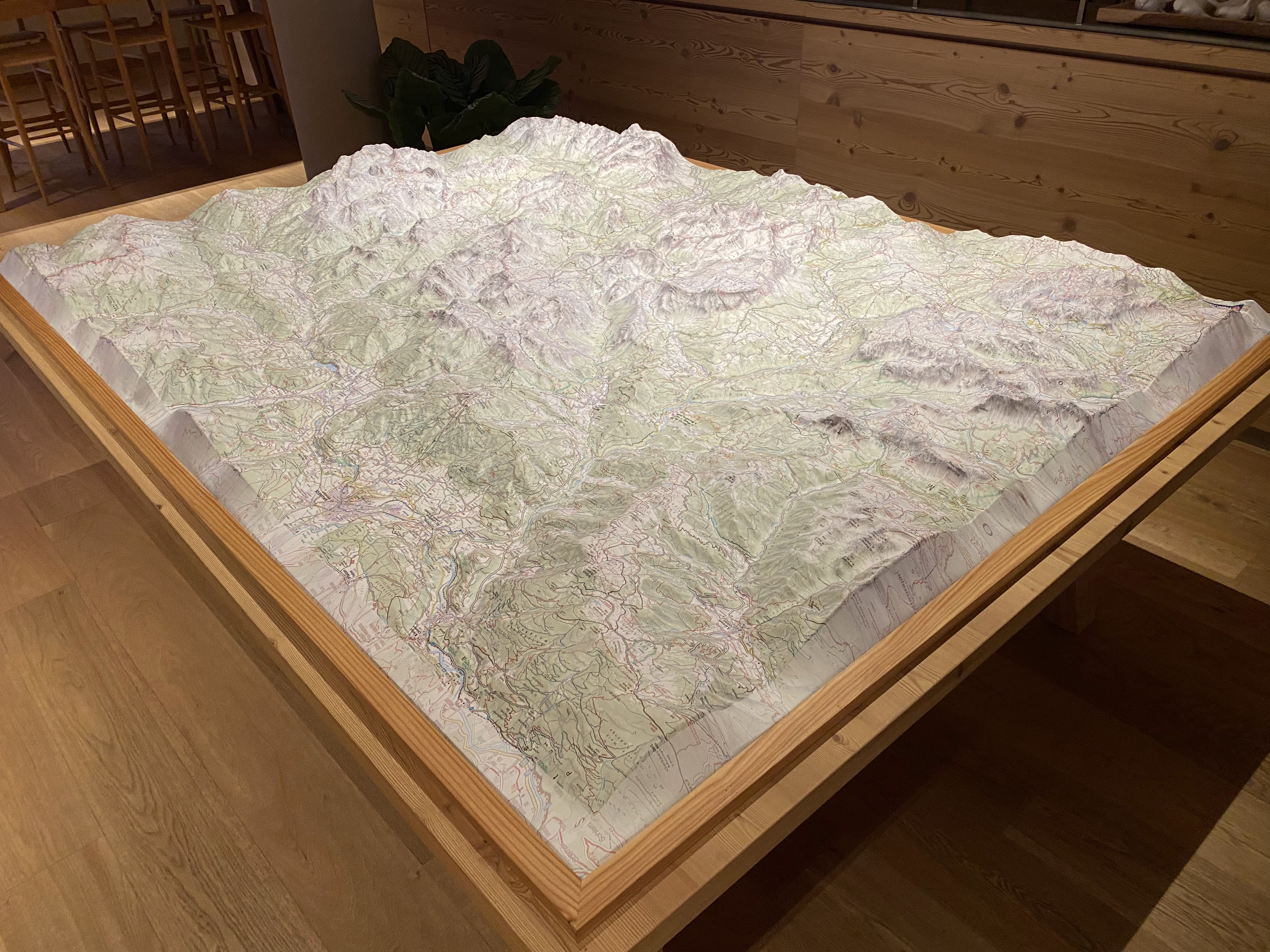
A vacuum formed relief map

Original equipment manufacturers (OEMs) utilize heavy gauge vacuum formed components for production quantities in the range of 250–3000 units per year. Vacuum-formed components can be used in place of complex fabricated sheet metal, fiberglass, or plastic injection molding. Typical industry examples besides product packaging include: fascias for outdoor kiosks and automated teller machines, enclosures for medical imaging and diagnostic equipment, engine covers in a truck cab or for construction equipment, and railcar interior trim and seat components. Vacuum formers are also often used by hobbyists, for applications such as masks and remote control cars. In the 20th century, vacuum forming was used to mass-produce raised-relief maps for military purposes.

== Common problems ==
There are some problems encountered in the vacuum forming process. Absorbed moisture can expand, forming bubbles within the plastic's inner layers. This significantly weakens the plastic. However, this can be solved by drying the plastic for an extended period at high but sub-melting temperature. Webs can form around the mold, which is due to overheating the plastic and so must be carefully monitored. Webbing can also occur when a mold is too large or parts of the mold are too close together. Finally, objects that are formed often stick to the mold, which is remedied by using a draft angle of three degrees or more in the mold. Thickness defects also cause the material to become less durable.

== Types of molds ==
There are numerous patterns one can make with vacuum forming. The most inventive way to use vacuum forming is to take any small item, replicate it many times and then vacuum form the new pattern to create a more cohesive form. The vacuum forming helps tie the individual pieces together and make one mold out of many pieces that can easily be replicated. From there plaster, concrete, etc. can be cast into the plastic form.

Wood patterns are a common material to vacuum form as it is relatively inexpensive and allows the customer to make changes to the design easily. The number of samples that one is able to get from any pattern depends on the size of the part and the thickness of the material. Once the specifications of the part have been met, the pattern is then used to create a ceramic composite mold, or cast aluminum mold for regular production. Potentially, there are ways to create holes in plaster with a vacuum form if the replicated forms made from the vacuum form are deep enough and gaps are left between them for the plastic to form into. Then, once the plastic is used to cast a plaster mold, the deep plastic areas will leave holes if the mold is not completely filled.

Cast aluminium molds are cast at a foundry and typically have temperature control lines running through them. This helps to set the heat of the plastic being formed as well as speed up the fabrication process. Aluminium molds can be male or female in nature, and can also be used in pressure forming applications. The main drawback with this type of mold is the cost.

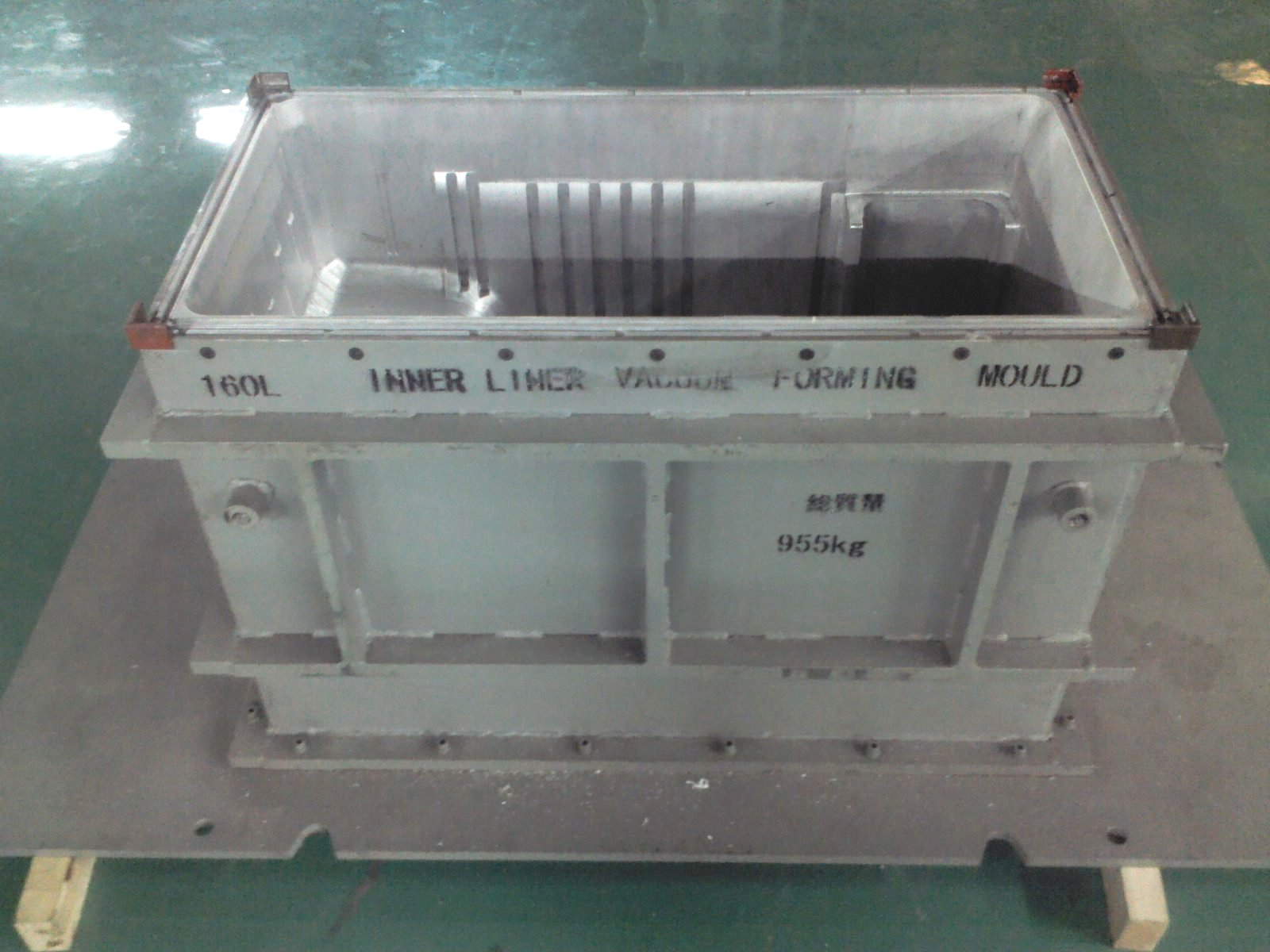
Vacuum forming mold made from Aluminium (cavity) and Steel (frame)

Machined aluminium molds are like cast aluminium, but are cut out of a solid block of aluminium using a CNC machine and a CAD program. Typically, machined aluminium is used for shallow draw parts out of thin gauge material. Applications may include packaging and trays. Cost is a significant factor with this type of tooling.

Composite molds are a lower cost alternative to cast or machined aluminium molds. Composite molds are typically made from filled resins that start as a liquid and harden with time. Depending on the application, composite molds can last a very long time and produce high quality parts.

== Finishing methods ==
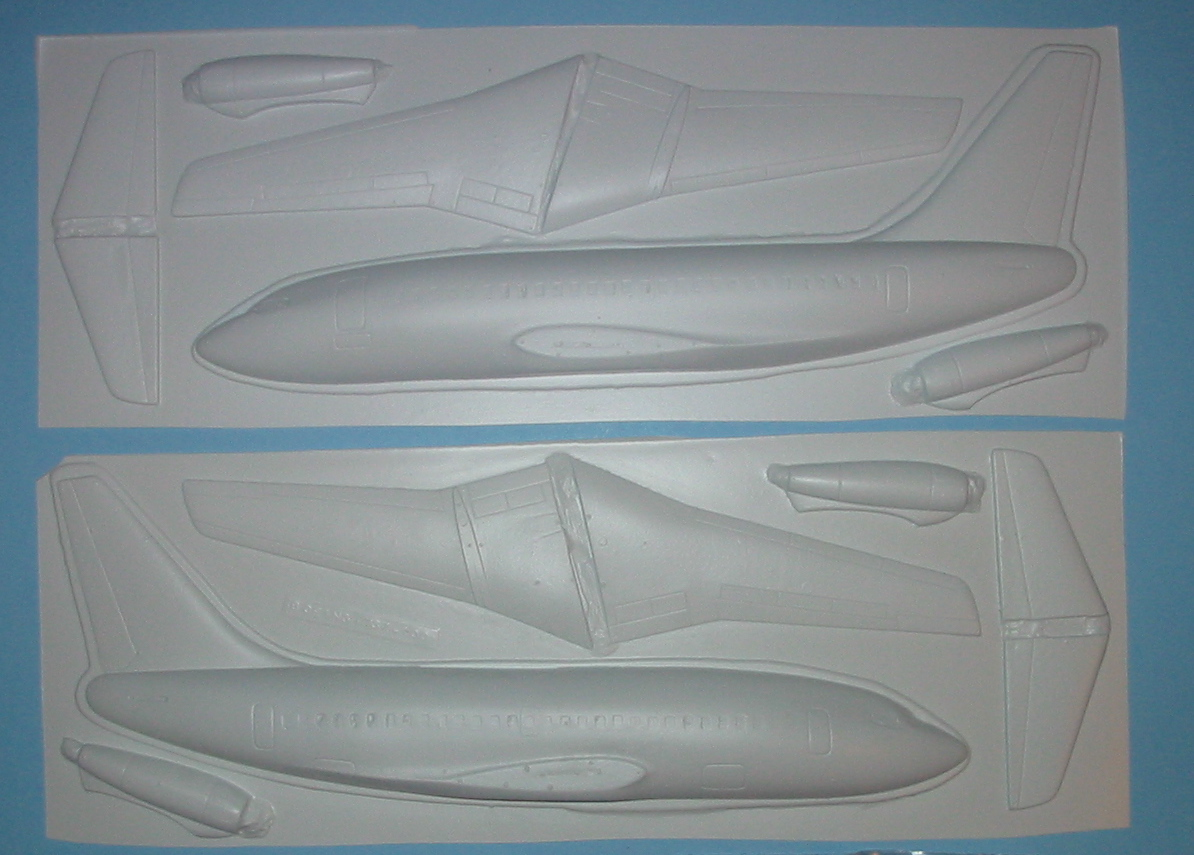
A sheet of vacuum-formed plastic. The pieces needed (in this case parts for a model aeroplane) will need to be cut out of the sheet.

Once a vacuum forming has been created out of a sheet of plastic, a finishing operation will be needed in most cases to turn it into a usable product. Common vacuum forming finishing methods include:

- Guillotining: The product is cut out of the sheet by pressing a blade through the product into a die underneath. This is a clean way of removing vacuum formed parts from the material sheet. It doesn't require a special cutting tool to be made for an individual product and is therefore suitable for low volumes of parts where straight lines are no problem. Cutting only straight lines and being a fairly slow approach compared to other finishing methods, guillotining can be expensive for projects with larger, more complex quantities.
- Drilling: If simple round holes are the required finish, manually drilling them is a good solution for small quantities. Drilling guides can be used to ensure holes can be drilled quickly in the right place. As this is a labour-intensive method, it is only suitable for small production quantities.
- Roller cutting: Process whereby the vacuum formed product is placed on a custom made cutter and pushed through a roller cutter machine. An efficient way of cutting vacuum formed items from the original sheet of vacuum forming material. The cutter can also cut any necessary holes, such as cable or access holes, at the same time. Roller cutting is suitable for fairly large items, where precision alignment is not required. As the vacuum forgings and the cutter are rolled sideways through the roller cutter machine, some misalignment can occur. Roller cutting can't be used for making holes or features in the sides of vacuum formings, as the cutter tool always cuts vertically from the bottom.
- Press cutting: This is a very precise method of cutting which uses a press and a custom precision made cutting tool. This method is very suitable for items where the roller cutter process wouldn't achieve the precision required. It is often used for punching very small finished items out of a plastic sheet, rather than punching features into a product. Press cutting can't be used to make features in the sides of vacuum formings.
- Cutting with a CNC machine: Machining is a very precise method of creating holes & features. The real advantage is that it can be used to create features in the sides of vacuum forming, e.g. guide rails for a tray that needs to slide onto shelving. It can also cut sidewalls of a different depth than the pockets—something which cannot be done with roller or press cutting.
