= 2001 Colorado Buffaloes football team =

American college football season

2001 Colorado Buffaloes football

Big 12 champion Big 12 North co-champion

Big 12 Championship Game, W 39–37 vs. Texas

Fiesta Bowl, L 16–38 vs. Oregon
- Conference: Big 12 Conference
- North Division

Ranking
- Coaches: No. 9
- AP: No. 9
- Record: 10–3 (7–1 Big 12)
- Head coach: Gary Barnett (3rd season)
- Offensive coordinator: Shawn Watson (2nd season)
- Offensive scheme: Multiple
- Co-defensive coordinators: Tom McMahon (3rd season); Vince Okruch (3rd season)
- Base defense: Multiple 4–3
- MVP: Daniel Graham
- Captains: Justin Bannan; Andre Gurode; Michael Lewis; John Minardi
- Home stadium: Folsom Field

2001 Big 12 Conference football standings
| | Conf. | | | Overall |
| Team | W | | L | W | | L |
|---|---|---|---|---|---|---|
North Division
| No. 9 Colorado xy$ | 7 | – | 1 | 10 | – | 3 |
| No. 8 Nebraska x% | 7 | – | 1 | 11 | – | 2 |
| Iowa State | 4 | – | 4 | 7 | – | 5 |
| Kansas State | 3 | – | 5 | 6 | – | 6 |
| Missouri | 3 | – | 5 | 4 | – | 7 |
| Kansas | 1 | – | 7 | 3 | – | 8 |
South Division
| No. 5 Texas xy | 7 | – | 1 | 11 | – | 2 |
| No. 6 Oklahoma | 6 | – | 2 | 11 | – | 2 |
| Texas Tech | 4 | – | 4 | 7 | – | 5 |
| Texas A&M | 4 | – | 4 | 8 | – | 4 |
| Oklahoma State | 2 | – | 6 | 4 | – | 7 |
| Baylor | 0 | – | 8 | 3 | – | 8 |
Championship: Colorado 39, Texas 37
$ – BCS representative as conference champion; % – BCS at-large representative; x – Division champion/co-champions; y – Championship game participant; Rankings from AP Poll

The 2001 Colorado Buffaloes football team represented the University of Colorado at Boulder during the 2001 NCAA Division I-A football season. The team played their home games at Folsom Field in Boulder, Colorado. They participated in the Big 12 Conference in the North Division. They were coached by head coach Gary Barnett. Colorado won the Big 12 Championship Game for the first time and secured its first BCS bowl berth. Colorado has not won the Big 12 since.

== Schedule ==
| Date | Time | Opponent | Rank | Site | TV | Result | Attendance |
|---|---|---|---|---|---|---|---|
| August 26 | 6:00 pm | Fresno State* | | Folsom Field; Boulder, CO (Jim Thorpe Classic) | ESPN2 | L 22–24 | 47,762 |
| September 1 | 1:30 pm | vs. No. 24 Colorado State* | | Invesco Field at Mile High; Denver, CO (Rocky Mountain Showdown) | ABC | W 41–14 | 75,022 |
| September 8 | 1:30 pm | San Jose State* | | Folsom Field; Boulder, CO | | W 51–15 | 40,338 |
| September 22 | 1:30 pm | Kansas | | Folsom Field; Boulder, CO | | W 27–16 | 47,495 |
| October 6 | 10:30 am | at No. 12 Kansas State | | KSU Stadium; Manhattan, KS (rivalry) | FSN | W 16–6 | 51,101 |
| October 13 | 1:30 pm | No. 25 Texas A&M^{†} | No. 20 | Folsom Field; Boulder, CO | PPV | W 31–21 | 49,521 |
| October 20 | 1:30 pm | at No. 9 Texas | No. 14 | Darrell K Royal–Texas Memorial Stadium; Austin, TX | ABC | L 7–41 | 83,156 |
| October 27 | 6:00 pm | at Oklahoma State | No. 25 | Lewis Field; Stillwater, OK | FSN | W 22–19 | 41,070 |
| November 3 | 1:00 pm | Missouri | No. 25 | Folsom Field; Boulder, CO | | W 38–24 | 45,942 |
| November 10 | 6:00 pm | at Iowa State | No. 21 | Jack Trice Stadium; Ames, IA | FSN | W 40–27 | 39,204 |
| November 23 | 1:30 pm | No. 2 Nebraska | No. 14 | Folsom Field; Boulder, CO (rivalry) | ABC | W 62–36 | 53,790 |
| December 1 | 7:00 pm | vs. No. 3 Texas | No. 9 | Texas Stadium; Irving, TX (Big 12 Championship Game) | ABC | W 39–37 | 65,675 |
| January 1 | 2:30 pm | vs. No. 2 Oregon* | No. 3 | Sun Devil Stadium; Tempe, AZ (Fiesta Bowl) | ABC | L 16–38 | 74,118 |
*Non-conference game; ^{†}Homecoming; Rankings from AP Poll released prior to the game; All times are in Mountain time

Note: Colorado was scheduled to play at Washington State on September 15 but the game was canceled due to the September 11 attacks.

== Rankings ==
Ranking movements Legend: ██ Increase in ranking ██ Decrease in ranking — = Not ranked
| | Week | | | | | | | | | | | | | | | | |
| Poll | Pre | 1 | 2 | 3 | 4 | 5 | 6 | 7 | 8 | 9 | 10 | 11 | 12 | 13 | 14 | 15 | Final |
|---|---|---|---|---|---|---|---|---|---|---|---|---|---|---|---|---|---|
| AP | — | — | — | — | — | — | 20 | 14 | 25 | 25 | 21 | 15 | 14 | 9 | 4 | 3 | 9 |
| Coaches | — | — | — | — | — | — | — | 17 | — | 25 | 20 | 16 | 14 | 10 | 5 | 3 | 9 |
| BCS | Not released | | | | | | | | — | — | — | 14 | 15 | 7 | 4 | 3 | Not released |

== Game summaries ==
=== Fresno State ===
Fresno State at Colorado

| Team | 1 | 2 | 3 | 4 | Total |
|---|---|---|---|---|---|
| • Bulldogs | 14 | 7 | 0 | 3 | 24 |
| Buffaloes | 0 | 13 | 3 | 6 | 22 |

- Date: August 26
- Location: Folsom Field, Boulder, Colorado
- Game start: 6:06 pm MDT
- Elapsed time: 3:30
- Game attendance: 47,762
- Referee: Chuck McFerrin
- TV announcers (ESPN2): Dave Barnett, Mike Golic, Bill Curry, Jimmy Dykes
- Source: Box score

Scoring summary
| 1 | 6:23 | FS | David Carr 1-yard run (Asen Asparuhov kick) | FSU 7–0 |
| 1 | 3:34 | FS | Paris Gaines 1-yard run (Asen Asparuhov kick) | FSU 14–0 |
| 2 | 6:03 | COL | Roma Hollowell 77-yard punt return (Pat Brougham kick) | FSU 14–7 |
| 2 | 1:58 | FS | Marque Davis 21-yard pass from David Carr (Asen Asparuhov kick) | FSU 21–7 |
| 2 | 0:56 | CU | John Minardi 8-yard pass from Craig Ochs (kick blocked) | FSU 21–13 |
| 4 | 12:29 | FS | Asen Asparuhov 43-yard field goal | FSU 24–16 |
| 4 | 7:51 | CU | John Minardi 16-yard pass from Craig Ochs (pass failed) | FSU 24–22 |

=== vs. No. 24 Colorado State ===
No. 24 Colorado State vs. Colorado

| Team | 1 | 2 | 3 | 4 | Total |
|---|---|---|---|---|---|
| No. 24 Rams | 7 | 0 | 0 | 7 | 14 |
| • Buffaloes | 14 | 3 | 14 | 10 | 41 |

- Date: September 1
- Location: Invesco Field at Mile High, Denver, Colorado
- Game start: 3:30 MST
- Game attendance: 75,022
- TV announcers (ABC): Terry Gannon, Reggie Rivers

=== San Jose State ===
San Jose State at Colorado

| Team | 1 | 2 | 3 | 4 | Total |
|---|---|---|---|---|---|
| Spartans | 0 | 9 | 0 | 6 | 15 |
| • Buffaloes | 21 | 14 | 9 | 7 | 51 |

- Date: September 8
- Location: Folsom Field, Boulder, Colorado
- Game attendance: 40,338
- Source: Box score

=== Kansas ===
Kansas at Colorado

| Team | 1 | 2 | 3 | 4 | Total |
|---|---|---|---|---|---|
| Jayhawks | 3 | 10 | 0 | 3 | 16 |
| • Buffaloes | 10 | 0 | 3 | 14 | 27 |

- Date: September 22
- Location: Folsom Field, Boulder, Colorado
- Game start: 1:32 pm MDT
- Elapsed time: 3:15
- Game attendance: 47,495
- Source: Box score

=== at No. 12 Kansas State ===
Colorado at No. 12 Kansas State

| Team | 1 | 2 | 3 | 4 | Total |
|---|---|---|---|---|---|
| • Buffaloes | 7 | 0 | 6 | 3 | 16 |
| No. 12 Wildcats | 0 | 0 | 0 | 6 | 6 |

- Date: October 6
- Location: KSU Stadium, Manhattan, Kansas
- Game start: 12:30 CDT
- Game attendance: 51,101
- TV announcers (FSN): Drew Goodman, Dave Lapham, Jim Knox
- Source: Box score

=== No. 25 Texas A&M Aggies ===
No. 25 Texas A&M at No. 20 Colorado

| Team | 1 | 2 | 3 | 4 | Total |
|---|---|---|---|---|---|
| No. 25 Aggies | 0 | 14 | 0 | 7 | 21 |
| • No. 20 Buffaloes | 3 | 11 | 3 | 14 | 31 |

- Date: October 13
- Location: Folsom Field, Boulder, Colorado
- Game attendance: 49,521

Playing as a ranked team and clinging to a 3-point lead in the final minute of play, the Buffs forced a fumble and returned it for a touchdown to close out a win over a second straight ranked opponent.

=== at No. 9 Texas ===
Colorado at No. 9 Texas

| Team | 1 | 2 | 3 | 4 | Total |
|---|---|---|---|---|---|
| Buffaloes | 0 | 7 | 0 | 0 | 7 |
| • No. 9 Longhorns | 7 | 17 | 10 | 7 | 41 |

- Date: October 20
- Location: Darrell K Royal–Texas Memorial Stadium, Austin, Texas
- Game start: 3:30 CDT
- Game attendance: 83,156
- TV announcers (ABC): Sean McDonough, Ed Cunningham, Leslie Gudel
- Source: Box score

=== at Oklahoma State ===
No. 25 Colorado at Oklahoma State

| Team | 1 | 2 | 3 | 4 | Total |
|---|---|---|---|---|---|
| • No. 25 Buffaloes | 7 | 0 | 7 | 8 | 22 |
| Cowboys | 0 | 16 | 3 | 0 | 19 |

- Date: October 27
- Location: Lewis Field, Stillwater, Oklahoma
- Game start: 7:00 CDT
- Game attendance: 41,070
- TV announcers (FSN): Joel Meyers, James Lofton, Eric Clemons
- Source: Box score

=== Missouri ===
Missouri at No. 25 Colorado

| Team | 1 | 2 | 3 | 4 | Total |
|---|---|---|---|---|---|
| Tigers | 0 | 14 | 7 | 3 | 24 |
| • No. 25 Buffaloes | 0 | 17 | 14 | 7 | 38 |

- Date: November 4
- Location: Folsom Field, Boulder, Colorado
- Game attendance: 45,942

=== at Iowa State ===
No. 21 Colorado at Iowa State

| Team | 1 | 2 | 3 | 4 | Total |
|---|---|---|---|---|---|
| • No. 21 Buffaloes | 10 | 13 | 7 | 10 | 40 |
| Cyclones | 14 | 0 | 0 | 13 | 27 |

- Date: November 10
- Location: Jack Trice Stadium, Ames, Iowa
- Game attendance: 39,024
- Source: Box score

=== No. 2 Nebraska ===
No. 2 Nebraska at No. 14 Colorado

| Team | 1 | 2 | 3 | 4 | Total |
|---|---|---|---|---|---|
| No. 2 Cornhuskers | 3 | 20 | 7 | 6 | 36 |
| • No. 14 Buffaloes | 28 | 14 | 0 | 20 | 62 |

- Date: November 23
- Location: Folsom Field, Boulder, Colorado
- Game attendance: 53,790
- TV announcers (ABC): Brent Musburger (Play–by–play), Gary Danielson (Color), & Jack Arute (Sideline)

Scoring summary
| 1 | 13:00 | COL | Bobby Purify 39-yard run (Brougham kick) | COL 7–0 |
| 1 | 12:03 | COL | Daniel Graham 21-yard pass from Bobby Pesavento (Brougham kick) | COL 14–0 |
| 1 | 5:45 | COL | Bobby Pesavento 1-yard run (Flores kick) | COL 21–0 |
| 1 | 3:31 | Neb | Josh Brown 28-yard field goal | COL 21–3 |
| 1 | 1:50 | COL | Chris Brown 11-yard run (Flores kick) | COL 28–3 |
| 2 | 12:21 | COL | Chris Brown 1-yard run (Flores kick) | COL 35–3 |
| 2 | 9:37 | Neb | Steve Kriewald 25-yard run (Brown kick) | COL 35–10 |
| 2 | 6:03 | Neb | Dahrran Diedrick 32-yard run (two-point conversion failed) | COL 35–16 |
| 2 | 3:19 | COL | Chris Brown 36-yard run (Flores kick) | COL 42–16 |
| 2 | 2:53 | Neb | Dahrran Diedrick 1-yard run (Brown kick) | COL 42–23 |
| 3 | 4:17 | Neb | Eric Crouch 6-yard run (Brown kick) | COL 42–30 |
| 4 | 12:50 | COL | Chris Brown 1-yard run (Flores kick) | COL 49–30 |
| 4 | 11:38 | COL | Chris Brown 13-yard run (kick failed) | COL 55–30 |
| 4 | 9:41 | COL | Chris Brown 8-yard run (Flores kick) | COL 62–30 |
| 4 | 7:30 | Neb | Eric Crouch 6-yard run (two-point conversion failed) | COL 62–36 |

=== vs. No. 3 Texas (Big 12 Championship Game) ===
No. 3 Texas vs. No. 9 Colorado

| Team | 1 | 2 | 3 | 4 | Total |
|---|---|---|---|---|---|
| No. 3 Longhorns | 7 | 10 | 3 | 17 | 37 |
| • No. 9 Buffaloes | 7 | 22 | 7 | 3 | 39 |

- Date: December 1
- Location: Texas Stadium, Irving, Texas
- Game start: 7:07 pm
- Elapsed time: 3:31
- Game attendance: 65,675
- Game weather: 61 °F (16 °C), Partly cloudy, Wind S 8 mph (13 km/h)
- Referee: John Laurie
- TV announcers (ABC): Brent Musburger, Gary Danielson, & Jack Arute
- Source: Big 12 game summary

Scoring summary
| 1 | 9:56 | TEX | Cedric Benson 5-yard run (Dusty Mangum kick) | TEX 7–0 |
| 1 | 2:21 | COL | Chris Brown 10-yard run (Jeremy Flores kick) | Tied 7–7 |
| 2 | 14:24 | COL | Jeremy Flores 39-yard field goal | COL 10–7 |
| 2 | 11:36 | COL | Chris Brown 1-yard run (Jeremy Flores kick failed) | COL 16–7 |
| 2 | 5:49 | TEX | Dusty Mangum 50-yard field goal | COL 16–10 |
| 2 | 3:48 | COL | Daniel Graham 22-yard pass from Bobb Pesavento (Bobb Pesavento pass failed) | COL 22–10 |
| 2 | 2:32 | COL | Medford Moorer 64-yard interception return (Jeremy Flores kick) | COL 29–10 |
| 2 | 1:47 | TEX | B. J. Johnson 79-yard pass from Major Applewhite (Dusty Mangum kick) | COL 29–17 |
| 3 | 11:32 | COL | Chris Brown 11-yard run (Jeremy Flores kick) | COL 36–17 |
| 3 | 7:32 | TEX | Dusty Mangum 26-yard field goal | COL 36–20 |
| 4 | 13:42 | TEX | Dusty Mangum 38-yard field goal | COL 36–23 |
| 4 | 9:10 | TEX | Roderick Babers 54-yard interception return (Dusty Mangum kick) | COL 36–30 |
| 4 | 1:58 | COL | Jeremy Flores 43-yard field goal | COL 39–30 |
| 4 | 0:31 | TEX | B. J. Johnson 1-yard pass from Major Applewhite (Dusty Mangum kick) | COL 39–37 |

=== vs. No. 2 Oregon (Fiesta Bowl) ===
No. 3 Colorado vs. No. 2 Oregon

| Team | 1 | 2 | 3 | 4 | Total |
|---|---|---|---|---|---|
| No. 3 Buffaloes | 7 | 0 | 0 | 9 | 16 |
| • No. 2 Ducks | 7 | 14 | 7 | 10 | 38 |

- Date: January 1
- Location: Sun Devil Stadium, Tempe, Arizona
- Game start: 5:00 p.m. PST
- Game attendance: 74,118
- TV announcers (ABC): Brent Musburger, Gary Danielson, & Jack Arute

Scoring summary
| 1 | 6:26 | COL | Brandon Drumm 1-yard run (Brougham kick) | COL 7–0 |
| 1 | 3:48 | ORE | Keenan Howry 28-yard pass from Joey Harrington (Siegel kick) | Tied 7–7 |
| 2 | 3:13 | ORE | Samie Parker 79-yard pass from Harrington (Siegel kick) | ORE 14–7 |
| 2 | 2:29 | ORE | Onterrio Smith 6-yard pass from Harrington (Siegel kick) | ORE 21–7 |
| 3 | 12:33 | ORE | Maurice Morris 49-yard run (Siegel kick) | ORE 28–7 |
| 4 | 12:03 | ORE | Jared Siegel 47-yard field goal | ORE 31–7 |
| 4 | 9:38 | ORE | Justin Peelle 4-yard pass from Harrington (Siegel kick) | ORE 38–7 |
| 4 | 5:47 | COL | Flores 39-yard field goal | ORE 38–10 |
| 4 | 0:18 | COL | Daniel Graham 4-yard pass from Ochs (kick failed) | ORE 38–16 |

== Roster ==
2001 Colorado Buffaloes football team roster
Players
Coaches
Offense

| Pos. | # | Name | Class |
|---|---|---|---|
| RB | 22 | Chris Brown | So |
| WR | 81 | Jason Burianek | Jr |
| WR | 14 | Cedric Cormier | Sr |
| FB | 33 | Brandon Drumm | Jr |
| TE | 89 | Daniel Graham | Sr |
| G | 65 | Andre Gurode (C) | Sr |
| WR | 5 | Roman Hollowell | Sr |
| RB | 21 | Marcus Houston | So |
| RB | 27 | Cortlen Johnson | Sr |
| C | 78 | Wayne Lucier | Jr |
| WR | 2 | John Minardi (C) | Sr |
| QB | 1 | Craig Ochs | So |
| QB | 4 | Bobby Pesavento | Sr |
| RB | 42 | Bobby Purify | So |

Defense

| Pos. | # | Name | Class |
|---|---|---|---|
| DT | 97 | Justin Bannan (C) | Sr |
| DE | 99 | Tyler Brayton | Jr |
| DE | 96 | James Weingardt | Jr |
| DT | 94 | DeAndre Fluellen | So |
| DE | 30 | Marques Harris | So |
| LB | 43 | Joey Johnson | Jr |
| SS | 31 | Michael Lewis (C) | Sr |
| DE | 60 | Matt McChesney | So |
| FS | 9 | Robbie Robinson | Sr |
| CB | 26 | Roderick Sneed | Jr |
| CB | 4 | Donald Strickland | Jr |
| LB | 54 | Sean Tufts | So |
| LB | 16 | Drew Wahlroos | Jr |

Special teams

| Pos. | # | Name | Class |
|---|---|---|---|
| K | 25 | Pat Brougham | Jr |
| K | 3 | Jeremy Flores | Sr |
| P | 8 | Mark Mariscal | Jr |

Head coach

- Gary Barnett

Coordinators/assistant coaches

- Shawn Watson – Offensive coordinator
- Tom McMahon – Co-defensive coordinator
- Vince Okruch – Co-defensive coordinator
- Vance Joseph Graduate assistant
- Eric Bieniemy – Running backs
- Jon Embree – Wide receivers, kicking

Legend

- (C) Team captain
- (S) Suspended
- (I) Ineligible
- Injured
- Redshirt

Roster

== Awards and honors ==
- Daniel Graham, TE – John Mackey Award, Consensus First-team All-American
- Andre Gurode, G – Consensus First-team All-American
- Gary Barnett – Big 12 Coach of the Year
