= 2001 Big 12 Championship Game =

- Conference Championship
Colorado Buffaloes	Texas Longhorns
(9–2)	(10–1)
39	37
Head coach: Gary Barnett	Head coach: Mack Brown
AP / Coaches / BCS; 9 / 10 / 7	AP / Coaches / BCS; 3 / 3 / 3
	1	2	3	4	Total
Colorado	7	22	7	3	39
Texas	7	10	3	17	37
- Date: December 1, 2001
- Season: 2001
- Stadium: Texas Stadium
- Location: Irving, Texas
- Referee: John Laurie
- Attendance: 65,675

United States TV coverage
- Network: ABC
- Announcers: Brent Musburger and Gary Danielson

2001 Big 12 Conference football standings
	Conf.			Overall
Team	W		L	W		L
North Division
No. 9 Colorado xy$	7	–	1	10	–	3
No. 8 Nebraska x%	7	–	1	11	–	2
Iowa State	4	–	4	7	–	5
Kansas State	3	–	5	6	–	6
Missouri	3	–	5	4	–	7
Kansas	1	–	7	3	–	8
South Division
No. 5 Texas xy	7	–	1	11	–	2
No. 6 Oklahoma	6	–	2	11	–	2
Texas Tech	4	–	4	7	–	5
Texas A&M	4	–	4	8	–	4
Oklahoma State	2	–	6	4	–	7
Baylor	0	–	8	3	–	8
Championship: Colorado 39, Texas 37
$ – BCS representative as conference champion; % – BCS at-large representative; x – Division champion/co-champions; y – Championship game participant; Rankings from AP Poll

The 2001 Big 12 Championship Game was a college football game played on Saturday, December 1, 2001, at Texas Stadium in Irving. This was the 6th Big 12 Championship Game and determined the 2001 champion of the Big 12 Conference. The game featured the Colorado Buffaloes, champions of the North division, and the Texas Longhorns, champions of the South division. Both teams had faced each other earlier in the regular season, with the Longhorns defeating the Buffaloes 41–7. However in the rematch in the championship game, Colorado would narrowly defeat them 39–37 and secure the Big 12 title.

== Game summary ==
2001 Big 12 Championship Game

Quarter	1	2	3	4	Total
No. 7 Colorado	7	22	7	3	39
No. 3 Texas	7	10	3	17	37

at Texas Stadium • Irving, Texas

- Date: December 1, 2001
- Game time: 7:00 p.m. CST
- Game weather: 61 °F (16 °C), Partly cloudy, Wind S 8 mph (13 km/h)
- Game attendance: 65,675
- Referee: John Laurie
- TV announcers (ABC): Brent Musburger and Gary Danielson
- Big 12 game summary

Game information

First quarter

- (9:56) UT – Cedric Benson 5-yard run, Dusty Mangum kick (Drive: 6 plays, 85 yards, 2:02; Texas 7–0)
- (2:21) CU – Chris Brown 10-yard run, Jeremy Flores kick (Drive: 3 plays, 12 yards, 1:18; Tied 7–7)

Second quarter

- (14:24) CU – Jeremy Flores 39-yard field goal (Drive: 5 plays, 31 yards, 1:26; Colorado 10–7)
- (11:36) CU – Chris Brown 1-yard run, Jeremy Flores kick failed (Drive: 6 plays, 64 yards, 2:19; Colorado 16–7)
- (5:49) UT – Dusty Mangum 50-yard field goal (Drive: 12 plays, 41 yards, 5:47; Colorado 16–10)
- (3:48) CU – Daniel Graham 22-yard pass from Bobb Pesavento, Bobb Pesavento pass failed (Drive: 1 play, 22 yards, 0:09; Colorado 22–10)
- (2:32) CU – Medford Moorer 64-yard interception return, Jeremy Flores kick (Drive: 12 plays, 41 yards, 5:47; Colorado 29–10)
- (1:47) UT – B. J. Johnson 79-yard pass from Major Applewhite, Dusty Mangum kick (Drive: 3 plays, 80 yards, 0:45; Colorado 29–17)

Third quarter

- (11:32) CU – Chris Brown 11-yard run, Jeremy Flores kick (Drive: 5 plays, 40 yards, 2:23; Colorado 36–17)
- (7:32) UT – Dusty Mangum 26-yard field goal (Drive: 8 plays, 71 yards, 4:00; Colorado 36–20)

Fourth quarter

- (13:42) UT – Dusty Mangum 38-yard field goal (Drive: 7 plays, 59 yards, 2:17; Colorado 36–23)
- (9:10) UT – Roderick Babers 54-yard interception return, Dusty Mangum kick (Drive: Colorado 36–30)
- (1:58) CU – Jeremy Flores 43-yard field goal (Drive: 16 plays, 51 yards, 7:12; Colorado 39–30)
- (0:31) UT – B. J. Johnson 1-yard pass from Major Applewhite, Dusty Mangum kick (Drive: 13 plays, 56 yards, 1:27; Colorado 39–37)

=== Statistics ===
Statistics	COL	TEX
First downs	18	22
Plays–yards	72–334	66–462
Rushes–yards	53–223	23–92
Passing yards	111	370
Passing: comp–att–int	8–19–2	24–43–3
Time of possession	35:09	24:51

Team	Category	Player	Statistics
Colorado	Passing	Bobby Pesavento	8/18, 111 yards, 1 TD
Colorado	Rushing	Chris Brown	33 carries, 182 yards, 3 TD
Colorado	Receiving	Derek McCoy	2 receptions, 44 yards
Texas	Passing	Major Applewhite	15/25, 240, 2 TD
Texas	Rushing	Cedric Benson	13 carries, 79 yards, 1 TD
Texas	Receiving	Roy Williams	5 receptions, 83 yards
