= 2001 Texas A&M Aggies football team =

American college football season

2001 Texas A&M Aggies football

GalleryFurniture.com Bowl champion

GalleryFurniture.com Bowl, W 28–9 vs. TCU
- Conference: Big 12 Conference
- South Division
- Record: 8–4 (4–4 Big 12)
- Head coach: R. C. Slocum (13th season)
- Offensive coordinator: Dino Babers (1st season)
- Offensive scheme: Spread
- Defensive coordinator: Mike Hankwitz (5th season)
- Base defense: 4–3
- Home stadium: Kyle Field

2001 Big 12 Conference football standings
	Conf.			Overall
Team	W		L	W		L
North Division
No. 9 Colorado xy$	7	–	1	10	–	3
No. 8 Nebraska x%	7	–	1	11	–	2
Iowa State	4	–	4	7	–	5
Kansas State	3	–	5	6	–	6
Missouri	3	–	5	4	–	7
Kansas	1	–	7	3	–	8
South Division
No. 5 Texas xy	7	–	1	11	–	2
No. 6 Oklahoma	6	–	2	11	–	2
Texas Tech	4	–	4	7	–	5
Texas A&M	4	–	4	8	–	4
Oklahoma State	2	–	6	4	–	7
Baylor	0	–	8	3	–	8
Championship: Colorado 39, Texas 37
$ – BCS representative as conference champion; % – BCS at-large representative; x – Division champion/co-champions; y – Championship game participant; Rankings from AP Poll

The 2001 Texas A&M Aggies football team completed the season with an 8–4 record. The Aggies had a regular season Big 12 record of 4–4.

== Schedule ==
Date	Time	Opponent	Rank	Site	TV	Result	Attendance
September 1	6:00 pm	McNeese State*		Kyle Field; College Station, TX		W 38–24	70,656
September 6	9:00 pm	at Wyoming*		War Memorial Stadium; Laramie, WY	ESPN2	W 28–20	18,131
September 22	11:30 am	Oklahoma State		Kyle Field; College Station, TX	FSN	W 21–7	82,601
September 29	2:30 pm	Notre Dame*		Kyle Field; College Station, TX	ABC	W 24–3	87,206
October 6	1:00 pm	Baylor	No. 24	Kyle Field; College Station, TX (Battle of the Brazos)		W 16–10	82,589
October 13	2:30 pm	at No. 20 Colorado	No. 25	Folsom Field; Boulder, CO	PPV	L 21–31	49,521
October 20	11:30 am	at Kansas State		KSU Stadium; Manhattan, KS	FSN	W 31–24	49,935
October 27	1:00 pm	Iowa State		Kyle Field; College Station, TX		W 24–21	85,661
November 3	1:00 pm	at Texas Tech	No. 24	Jones SBC Stadium; Lubbock, TX (rivalry)	PPV	L 0–12	52,649
November 10	11:00 am	at No. 3 Oklahoma		Oklahoma Memorial Stadium; Norman, OK	ABC	L 10–31	75,525
November 23	11:00 am	No. 5 Texas		Kyle Field; College Station, TX (rivalry)	ABC	L 7–21	87,555
December 28	12:30 pm	vs. TCU*		Reliant Astrodome; Houston, Texas (Galleryfurniture.com Bowl)	ESPN	W 28–9	53,480
*Non-conference game; Rankings from AP Poll released prior to the game; All times are in Central time

== Game summaries ==
=== McNeese State ===
	1	2	3	4	Total
McNeese St	9	7	8	0	24
Texas A&M	0	10	14	14	38

=== Wyoming ===
	1	2	3	4	Total
Texas A&M	7	14	0	7	28
Wyoming	7	7	6	0	20

=== Oklahoma State ===
Red, White, and Blue Out game vs. Oklahoma State

	1	2	3	4	Total
Oklahoma State	0	7	0	0	7
Texas A&M	7	0	14	0	21

=== Notre Dame ===
	1	2	3	4	Total
Notre Dame	0	3	0	0	3
Texas A&M	14	3	0	7	24

=== Baylor ===
	1	2	3	4	Total
Baylor	7	3	0	0	10
#22 Texas A&M	0	3	10	3	16

=== Colorado ===
	1	2	3	4	Total
#19 Texas A&M	0	14	0	7	21
Colorado	3	11	3	14	31

=== Kansas State ===
	1	2	3	4	Total
Texas A&M	7	7	17	0	31
Kansas State	0	7	3	14	24

=== Iowa State ===
	1	2	3	4	Total
Iowa State	0	7	0	14	21
#24 Texas A&M	7	0	7	10	24

=== Texas Tech ===
	1	2	3	4	Total
#17 Texas A&M	0	0	0	0	0
Texas Tech	0	3	3	6	12

=== Oklahoma ===
	1	2	3	4	Total
Texas A&M	10	0	0	0	10
#4 Oklahoma	0	10	7	14	31

=== Texas ===
	1	2	3	4	Total
#5 Texas	7	0	0	14	21
Texas A&M	0	0	7	0	7

=== Texas Christian ===
	1	2	3	4	Total
TCU	0	7	0	2	9
Texas A&M	0	14	7	7	28

== Roster ==
2001 Texas A&M Aggies football team roster
Players			Coaches
Offense: Pos. / # / Name / Class	Defense: Pos. / # / Name / Class; DL / 95 / Rocky Bernard / Sr	Special teams: Pos. / # / Name / Class	Head coach: R. C. Slocum; Coordinators/assistant coaches Legend: (C) Team captain; (S) Suspended; (I) Ineligible; Injured; Redshirt; Roster
