= Tom Hayes (American football coach) =

American football player and coach (born 1949)

Biographical details
- Born: March 26, 1949 (age 77); Keokuk, Iowa, U.S.

Playing career
- 1967–1970: Iowa
- Position: Defensive back

Coaching career (HC unless noted)
- 1976: Coe (assistant)
- 1977–1978: Iowa (DB)
- 1979: Cal State Fullerton (DC)
- 1980–1981: UCLA (DB)
- 1982–1988: UCLA (co-DC / DB)
- 1989–1990: Texas A&M (AHC/DB)
- 1991–1994: Oklahoma (DC/DB)
- 1995–1999: Washington Redskins (DB)
- 2001: Kansas (DC / interim HC)
- 2005: Stanford (assistant)
- 2006–2007: New Orleans Saints (DB)
- 2010: Tulane (assistant)
- 2011–2017: Kansas State (DB/DC)

Head coaching record
- Overall: 1–2

Tom Hayes (born March 26, 1949) is a retired American football coach. He most recently served as the defensive coordinator at Kansas State University. Hayes was the interim head football coach at the University of Kansas for the final three games of the 2001 season.

== Head coaching record ==
Year	Team	Overall	Conference	Standing
Kansas Jayhawks (Big 12 Conference) (2001)
2001	Kansas	1–2 (Note: Hayes served as interim head coach for the final three games of the season following the firing of Terry Allen on November 4. Kansas finished the season with an overall record of 3–8 and a conference mark of 1–7.)	0–2	6th (North)
Kansas:		1–2	0–2	
Total:		1–2		
