= Bobby Pesavento =

American football player (born 1979)

No. 4
- Position: Quarterback

Personal information
- Born: July 12, 1979 (age 47); Schererville, Indiana, U.S.
- Listed height: 6 ft 4 in (1.93 m)
- Listed weight: 225 lb (102 kg)

Career information
- High school: Lake Central (St. John, Indiana)
- College: Miami (OH) (1997–1998); Fort Scott CC (1999); Colorado (2000–2001)
- NFL draft: 2002: undrafted

Career history
- Colorado Crush (2003); Austin Wranglers (2004–2005); Bakersfield Blitz (2006)

Career AFL statistics
- Comp. / Att.: 65 / 120
- Passing yards: 680
- TD–INT: 10–5
- Passer rating: 74.31
- Stats at ArenaFan.com

Bobby Pesavento (born July 12, 1979) is an American former professional football quarterback who played three seasons in the Arena Football League (AFL) with the Colorado Crush and Austin Wranglers. He played college football at Miami University, Fort Scott Community College, and the University of Colorado Boulder.

== Early life ==
Bobby Pesavento was born on July 12, 1979, in Schererville, Indiana. He attended Lake Central High School in St. John, Indiana. He did not play football until his sophomore year of high school. Pesavento earned second-team all-state honors his senior season in 1996. He also played basketball in high school. He graduated from Lake Central in 1997.

== College career ==
Pesavento was a member of the Miami RedHawks of Miami University from 1997 to 1998. He redshirted the 1997 season. In 1998, he completed eight of 16 passes for 67 yards and one interception. He played for the Fort Scott Greyhounds of Fort Scott Community College in 1999, garnering second-team All-Jayhawk Conference recognition.

Pesavento was then a two-year letterman for the Colorado Buffaloes of the University of Colorado Boulder from 2000 to 2001. He threw passes in four games, starting two of them, in 2000, recording 43 completions on 72 passing attempts (59.7%) for 536 yards, and three touchdowns while scoring one rushing touchdown as well. He took over as starter in 2001 after Craig Ochs suffered an injury on October 27. On November 23, 2001, Pesavento completed nine of 16 passes for 202 yards and one touchdown while rushing for another touchdown in a 62–36 upset victory over No. 2 ranked Nebraska. In the next game of the season, Pesavento completed eight of 18 passes for 111 yards, one touchdown, and one interception in another upset victory over No. 3 ranked Texas in the 2001 Big 12 Championship Game. Ochs was healthy enough to play in the 2002 Fiesta Bowl against No. 2 ranked Oregon but Colorado head coach Gary Barnett decided to stick with Pesavento as the starter. In the Fiesta Bowl, Pesavento completed 11 of 27 passes for 139 yards and two interceptions before being replaced by Ochs with 11:52 left in the fourth quarter. The Buffaloes went on to lose by a score of 38–16. Overall in 2001, Pesavento completed 85 of 139 passes (61.2%) for 1,234 yards, eight touchdowns, and four interceptions while also rushing for one touchdown.

== Professional career ==
Pesavento played in four games, starting one, for the Colorado Crush of the Arena Football League (AFL) in 2003, totaling 13 completions on 37 passing attempts (35.1%) for 118 yards, two touchdowns, and two interceptions, and one rushing touchdown.

He played in all 16 games for the Austin Wranglers of the AFL in 2004, completing five of five passes for 98 yards and two touchdowns. The Wranglers finished the season with an 8–8 record. He appeared in three games during the 2005 season, recording 47 completions on 78 attempts (60.3%) for 464 yards, six touchdowns, and three interceptions.

Pesavento was a member of the Bakersfield Blitz of the af2 in 2006.

== Personal life ==
Pesavento was later the vice president of business development for Poms & Associates Insurance Brokers, Inc., a risk consulting business.
