= Minardi (disambiguation) =

Minardi was an automobile racing team and constructor.

== People ==
Minardi is a surname of Italian origin. Notable people with the surname include:

- Éric Minardi (born 1956), French politician
- Giancarlo Minardi (born 1947), founder of Minardi
- Giuseppe Minardi (1928–2019), former Italian racing cyclist
- John Minardi (born 1979), former American football player
- Natalie Minardi Slater, American television soap opera writer
- Tommaso Minardi (1787–1871), Italian painter and author on art theory
- Viviano Minardi (born 1998), Italian football player

== Other ==
- Minardi Piquet Sports, auto racing team currently known as Rapax Team
- Minardi Team USA, auto racing team also known as HVM Racing
- Minardi (horse)
