= Big 12 Conference football =

American college football conference

The Big 12 Conference is a conference of 16 universities which participate in the National Collegiate Athletic Association's Division I Football Bowl Subdivision football. The conference formed in 1994 and begin conference play in the fall of 1996. The schools that compose the Big 12 Conference, except for Arizona, Arizona State, Brigham Young, Central Florida, Cincinnati, Utah, and West Virginia, were members of either the Big Eight Conference or the Southwest Conference. Current Big 12 football teams claim a total of six national titles, while previous members of the conference claim an additional 19 titles. The current conference champion is Arizona State, the school's first Big 12 title.

== Membership ==
=== Current ===
Institution	Nickname (Mascot)	Colors	Location	Team Started	Affiliation	Enrollment	Divisional Titles^{†}	Big 12 Titles	National Titles
University of Arizona	Wildcats (Wilbur and Wilma)		Tucson, Arizona (542,629)	1899	Public	49,471	0	0	0
Arizona State University	Sun Devils (Sparky)		Tempe, Arizona (180,587)	1897	Public	79,232	0	1	0
Baylor University	Bears (Bruiser and Marigold)		Waco, Texas (132,356)	1898	Private / Baptist	18,033	0	3^{‡}	0
Brigham Young University	Cougars (Cosmo the Cougar)		Provo, Utah (115,162)	1922	Private (LDS)	33,633	0	0	1
University of Central Florida	Knights (Knightro)		Orlando, Florida (320,742)	1979	Public	70,674	0	0	1
University of Cincinnati	Bearcats (Bearcat)		Cincinnati, Ohio (311,097)	1885	Public	45,949	0	0	0
University of Colorado	Buffaloes (Ralphie / Chip)		Boulder, Colorado (107,349)	1890	Public	36,430	4	1	1
University of Houston	Cougars (Shasta / Sasha)		Houston, Texas (2,314,157)	1946	Public	47,090	0	0	0
Iowa State University	Cyclones (Cy the Cardinal)		Ames, Iowa (65,060)	1892	Public	36,350	1	0	0
University of Kansas	Jayhawks (Big Jay / Baby Jay)		Lawrence, Kansas (96,207)	1890	Public	27,565	1	0	0
Kansas State University	Wildcats (Willie the Wildcat)		Manhattan, Kansas (53,682)	1896	Public	23,779	4	3	0
Oklahoma State University	Cowboys (Pistol Pete / Bullet)		Stillwater, Oklahoma (48,967)	1890	Public	25,622	1	1	1
Texas Christian University	Horned Frogs (Super Frog)		Fort Worth, Texas (833,319)	1896	Private/ Disciples of Christ	10,394	0	1^{‡}	2
Texas Tech University	Red Raiders (Masked Rider / Raider Red)		Lubbock, Texas (249,042)	1925	Public	36,551	1	1	0
University of Utah	Utes (Swoop)		Salt Lake City, Utah (200,133)	1892	Public	34,900	0	0	0
West Virginia University	Mountaineers (The Mountaineer)		Morgantown, West Virginia (30,708)	1891	Public	24,488	0	0	0

^{†}Divisions existed from 1996 through 2010.
^{‡}: The Big 12 Conference recognizes TCU and Baylor as co-champions in 2014

=== Former ===
Institution	Team Name (Mascot)	Location (Population)	Team Started	Affiliation	Divisional Titles	Big 12 Titles	National Titles	Current Conference
University of Missouri	Tigers (Truman the Tiger)	Columbia, Missouri (133,803)	1890	Public	3	0	0	SEC
University of Nebraska	Cornhuskers (Herbie Husker / Lil' Red)	Lincoln, Nebraska (277,348)	1890	Public	6	2	5	Big Ten
University of Oklahoma	Sooners (Sooner Schooner)	Norman, Oklahoma (128,026)	1895	Public	8	14	7	SEC
University of Texas	Longhorns (Bevo)	Austin, Texas (974,447)	1893	Public	7	4	4	SEC
Texas A&M University	Aggies (Reveille)	College Station, Texas (107,889)	1894	Public	3	1	3	SEC

=== Facilities and coaches ===
School	Stadium (Capacity)	Coach	Year Hired	Record (Career)	Record (School)	Big 12 Record	Big 12 Title	Total Pay
Arizona	Arizona Stadium (50,782)	Brent Brennan	2024	38-56	4-8	2-7	0	$2,700,000
Arizona State	Mountain America Stadium (53,599)	Kenny Dillingham	2023	14-12	14-12	7-2	1	$3,950,000
Baylor	McLane Stadium (45,140)	Dave Aranda	2020	31-30	31-30	21-24	1	$3,021,003
BYU	LaVell Edwards Stadium (63,470)	Kalani Sitake	2016	72-43	72-43	9-9	0	†
Cincinnati	Nippert Stadium (40,000)	Scott Satterfield	2023	84-64	8-16	4-14	0	$3,600,000
Colorado	Folsom Field (50,183)	Deion Sanders	2023	40-18	11-10	7-2	0	$5,700,000
Houston	TDECU Stadium (40,000)	Willie Fritz	2024	212-124	4-8	3-6	0	$4,500,000
Iowa State	Jack Trice Stadium (61,500)	Matt Campbell	2016	88–63	64-51	45-36	0	$4,005,537
Kansas	David Booth Kansas Memorial Stadium (50,250)	Lance Leipold	2021	168-67	22-28	13-23	0	$7,791,667
Kansas State	Bill Snyder Family Football Stadium (50,000)	Chris Klieman	2019	120-41	48-28	31-23	1	$4,750,000
Oklahoma State	Boone Pickens Stadium (55,509)	Eric Morris	2025	46–34	0–0	0–0	0	$6,750,000
TCU	Amon G. Carter Stadium (45,000)	Sonny Dykes	2022	98-76	27-13	17-10	1	†
Texas Tech	Jones AT&T Stadium (60,454)	Joey McGuire	2022	23-16	23-16	15-12	0	$4,104,960
UCF	FBC Mortgage Stadium (45,301)	Scott Frost	2025 (Note: Frost was previously head coach at UCF in 2016 and 2017.)	35-38	19-7	0-0 (Note: UCF was a member of the American Athletic Conference during Frost's first tenure. The Knights were 12-4 in AAC play in those seasons.)	0 (Note: UCF won the 2017 AAC championship under Frost.)	$3,900,000
Utah	Rice-Eccles Stadium (51,444)	Morgan Scalley	2025	1-0	1-0	0-0	0 (Note: Utah won one Mountain West and two Pac-12 championships under Whittingham prior to joining the Big 12. Morgan Scalley Took over the program after former head coach Kyle Whittingham stepped down from the head coaching job.)	$5,000,000
West Virginia	Milan Puskar Stadium (60,000)	Rich Rodriguez	2025 (Note: Rodriguez was previously head coach at West Virginia from 2001-2007.)	190-129-2	60-26	0-0 (Note: West Virginia was a member of the original Big East Conference throughout Rodriguez' first tenure with the Mountaineers. WVU was 34-14 in Big East play under Rodriguez.)	0 (Note: West Virginia won four Big East championships under Rodriguez)	$3,500,000

† denotes school is a private institution and is not required to disclose coaches pay

== Realignment ==
In 2010, it was announced that in 2011 both Nebraska and Colorado would leave the Big 12 for the Big Ten and Pac-10 respectively. Then in 2011 it was announced that Texas A&M and Missouri would both be leaving for the SEC. As replacements, TCU and West Virginia would be joining the conference from the Mountain West and Big East respectively. In 2021, Oklahoma and Texas announced they would leave to join the Southeastern Conference. In response, the Big 12 decided to backfill with the University of Cincinnati, the University of Central Florida, the University of Houston, and Brigham Young University. The first 3 schools joining from the American Athletic Conference and BYU being an Independent in football since 2010, with its basketball team playing in the West Coast Conference.

On July 27, 2023, Colorado, a former member of the Big 12, announced it would rejoin the conference from the Pac-12 beginning in the 2024–25 academic year. The following week, Arizona, Arizona State, and Utah announced they would leave the Pac-12 for the Big 12, also effective for the 2024–25 academic year.

== Scheduling ==
=== Divisions ===
North Division	South Division
Colorado	Baylor
Iowa State	Oklahoma
Kansas	Oklahoma State
Kansas State	Texas
Missouri	Texas A&M
Nebraska	Texas Tech

From the time the league was formed until realignment, the conference was split into two, six team, divisions. Teams played a total of 11 regular season games, three non-conference match-ups and eight conference games per season. The conference games were a combination of five divisional foes and three from the opposing division. Inter-divisional play was a "three-on, three-off" system, where teams played three teams from the other division on a home-and-home basis for two seasons, and then played the other three foes from the opposite side for a two-year home-and-home.

At the conclusion of the regular season, the top team from the South Division played the top team from the North Division in the Big 12 Championship Game.

=== Round-robin ===
After the departure of Nebraska and Colorado, both the divisional format and the Championship Game were dropped. Members continue to play three non-conference opponents in addition to playing all nine other members of the conference on an annual basis.

Starting again in 2017 the Championship Game was reinstated, the two teams with the highest conference winning percentage play in the game.

== Champions ==
Since its inception in 1996, the Big 12 championship has been won by nine different schools, three of which no longer belong to the conference. From 1996 to 2010, the championship was determined in the Big 12 championship game. Following the departures of two schools in 2010, the conference discontinued the championship game in favor of a round-robin format to determine the champion. The University of Oklahoma Sooners have won the most championships with 14.

=== Championship game ===
The Big 12 Championship Game was first held by the Big 12 Conference each year from 1996 until 2010 and again starting with the 2017 season. The original championship game pitted the Big 12 North Division champion against the Big 12 South Division champion in a game held after the regular season has been completed. The first championship game was held during the 1996 season in St. Louis. The 2009 and 2010 games were played at Cowboys Stadium in Arlington, Texas. Following the departures of Nebraska and Colorado to the Big Ten and Pac-12 respectively, the Big 12 Championship Game was discontinued. Following an NCAA rule change in 2015 which allows conferences with fewer than 12 members to hold a championship game, the Big 12 elected to return to a postseason championship game to determine the conference champion. Following the completion of the round-robin regular season, the conference's top two teams compete in the championship game. Oklahoma defeated TCU 41–17 on December 2, 2017, in the first Big 12 Championship Game played since 2010.

=== Championships by school ===
School	Championships	Years
Oklahoma Sooners^{‡}	14	2000 • 2002 • 2004 • 2006 • 2007 • 2008 • 2010 • 2012^{†} •2015 • 2016 • 2017 • 2018 • 2019 • 2020
Texas Longhorns^{‡}	4	1996 • 2005 • 2009 • 2023
Baylor Bears	3	2013 • 2014^{†} • 2021
Kansas State Wildcats	3	2003 • 2012^{†} • 2022
Nebraska Cornhuskers^{‡}	2	1997 • 1999
TCU Horned Frogs	1	2014^{†}
Oklahoma State Cowboys	1	2011
Colorado Buffaloes	1	2001
Texas A&M Aggies^{‡}	1	1998
Arizona State Sun Devils	1	2024
Texas Tech Red Raiders	1	2025

^{†}: Denotes co-champion
^{‡}: Denotes former member of the conference

== Bowl games ==
Pick	Name	Location	Opposing conference	Opposing pick
1	College Football Playoff	Misc.	All FBS Conferences	N/A
2	Alamo Bowl	San Antonio, Texas	Legacy Pac-12 (Big Ten, Big 12, ACC)	1
3	Pop-Tarts Bowl	Orlando, Florida	ACC	2/3/4
4	Texas Bowl	Houston, Texas	SEC	3/4/5/6/7/8
5	Liberty Bowl	Memphis, Tennessee	SEC	3/4/5/6/7/8
6	Cactus Bowl	Tempe, Arizona	Big Ten	7
7	Independence Bowl	Shreveport, Louisiana	Legacy Pac-12 (Big Ten, Big 12, ACC)	6
8	ESPN Events Bowls	Misc.	All FBS Conferences	Last

== Bowl Game Results ==
Bowl games played by teams while they were in the Big 12

Year	Date	Bowl	Winning Team	Winning Score	Losing Team	Losing Score
2024	Jan 1 28, 2025	Peach Bowl	Texas	39	Arizona State	31
2024	Dec 31, 2024	Texas Bowl	LSU	44	Baylor	31
2024	Dec 28, 2024	Alamo Bowl	BYU	36	Colorado	14
2024	Dec 28, 2024	Pop-Tarts Bowl	Iowa State	42	Miami (FL)	41
2024	Dec 28, 2024	New Mexico Bowl	TCU	34	Louisiana	3
2024	Dec 27, 2024	Liberty Bowl	Arkansas	39	Texas Tech	26
2024	Dec 26, 2024	Rate Bowl	Kansas State	44	Rutgers	41
2024	Dec 17, 2024	Frisco Bowl	Memphis	42	West Virginia	37
2023	Jan 1, 2024	Sugar Bowl	Washington	37	Texas	31
2023	Dec 29, 2023	Liberty Bowl	Memphis	36	Iowa State	26
2023	Dec 28, 2023	Alamo Bowl	Arizona	38	Oklahoma	24
2023	Dec 28, 2023	Pop-Tarts Bowl	Kansas State	28	NC State	19
2023	Dec 27, 2023	Texas Bowl	Oklahoma State	31	Texas A&M	23
2023	Dec 27, 2023	Duke's Mayo Bowl	West Virginia	30	North Carolina	10
2023	Dec 26, 2023	Guaranteed Rate Bowl	Kansas	49	UNLV	36
2023	Dec 22, 2023	Gasparilla Bowl	Georgia Tech	30	UCF	17
2023	Dec 16, 2023	Independence Bowl	Texas Tech	34	California	14
2022	Jan 9, 2023	CFP National Championship	Georgia	65	TCU	7
2022	Dec 31, 2022	Fiesta Bowl	TCU	51	Michigan	45
2022	Dec 31, 2022	Sugar Bowl	Alabama	45	Kansas State	20
2022	Dec 29, 2022	Alamo Bowl	Washington	27	Texas	20
2022	Dec 29, 2022	Cheez-It Bowl	Florida State	35	Oklahoma	32
2022	Dec 28, 2022	Liberty Bowl	Arkansas	55	Kansas	53
2022	Dec 28, 2022	Texas Bowl	Texas Tech	42	Ole Miss	25
2022	Dec 27, 2022	Guaranteed Rate Bowl	Wisconsin	24	Oklahoma State	17
2022	Dec 22, 2022	Armed Forces Bowl	Air Force	30	Baylor	15
2021	Jan 4, 2022	Texas Bowl	Kansas State	42	LSU	20
2021	Jan 1, 2022	Fiesta Bowl	Oklahoma State	37	Notre Dame	35
2021	Jan 1, 2022	Sugar Bowl	Baylor	21	Ole Miss	7
2021	Dec 29, 2021	Alamo Bowl	Oklahoma	47	Oregon	32
2021	Dec 29, 2021	Cheez-It Bowl	Clemson	20	Iowa State	13
2021	Dec 28, 2021	Guaranteed Rate Bowl	Minnesota	18	West Virginia	6
2021	Dec 28, 2021	Liberty Bowl	Texas Tech	34	Mississippi St	7
2020	Jan 2, 2021	Fiesta Bowl	Iowa State	34	Oregon	17
2020	Dec 31, 2020	Liberty Bowl	West Virginia	24	Army	21
2020	Dec 30, 2020	Cotton Bowl	Oklahoma	55	Florida	20
2020	Dec 29, 2020	Alamo Bowl	Texas	55	Colorado	23
2020	Dec 29, 2020	Cheez-It Bowl	Oklahoma State	37	Miami (FL)	34
2019	Jan 1, 2020	Sugar Bowl	Georgia	26	Baylor	14
2019	Dec 31, 2019	Alamo Bowl	Texas	38	Utah	10
2019	Dec 31, 2019	Liberty Bowl	Navy	20	Kansas State	17
2019	Dec 28, 2019	Camping World Bowl	Notre Dame	33	Iowa State	9
2019	Dec 28, 2019	Peach Bowl	LSU	63	Oklahoma	28
2019	Dec 27, 2019	Texas Bowl	Texas A&M	24	Oklahoma State	21
2018	Jan 1, 2019	Sugar Bowl	Texas	28	Georgia	21
2018	Dec 31, 2018	Liberty Bowl	Oklahoma State	38	Missouri	33
2018	Dec 29, 2018	Orange Bowl	Alabama	45	Oklahoma	34
2018	Dec 28, 2018	Alamo Bowl	Washington St	28	Iowa State	26
2018	Dec 28, 2018	Camping World Bowl	Syracuse	34	West Virginia	18
2018	Dec 27, 2018	Texas Bowl	Baylor	45	Vanderbilt	38
2018	Dec 26, 2018	Cheez-It Bowl	TCU	10	California	7
2017	Jan 1, 2018	Rose Bowl	Georgia	54	Oklahoma	48
2017	Dec 30, 2017	Liberty Bowl	Iowa State	21	Memphis	20
2017	Dec 28, 2017	Alamo Bowl	TCU	39	Stanford	37
2017	Dec 28, 2017	Camping World Bowl	Oklahoma State	30	Virginia Tech	21
2017	Dec 27, 2017	Texas Bowl	Texas	33	Missouri	16
2017	Dec 26, 2017	Cactus Bowl	Kansas State	35	UCLA	17
2017	Dec 26, 2017	Heart of Dallas Bowl	Utah	30	West Virginia	14
2017	Dec 23, 2017	Birmingham Bowl	South Florida	38	Texas Tech	34
2016	Jan 2, 2017	Sugar Bowl	Oklahoma	35	Auburn	19
2016	Dec 30, 2016	Liberty Bowl	Georgia	31	TCU	23
2016	Dec 29, 2016	Alamo Bowl	Oklahoma State	38	Colorado	8
2016	Dec 28, 2016	Russell Athletic Bowl	Miami (FL)	31	West Virginia	14
2016	Dec 28, 2016	Texas Bowl	Kansas State	33	Texas A&M	28
2016	Dec 27, 2016	Cactus Bowl	Baylor	31	Boise State	12
2015	Jan 2, 2016	Alamo Bowl	TCU	47	Oregon	41
2015	Jan 2, 2016	Cactus Bowl	West Virginia	43	Arizona State	42
2015	Jan 2, 2016	Liberty Bowl	Arkansas	45	Kansas State	23
2015	Jan 1, 2016	Sugar Bowl	Ole Miss	48	Oklahoma State	20
2015	Dec 31, 2015	Orange Bowl	Clemson	37	Oklahoma	17
2015	Dec 29, 2015	Russell Athletic Bowl	Baylor	49	North Carolina	38
2015	Dec 29, 2015	Texas Bowl	LSU	56	Texas Tech	27
2014	Jan 2, 2015	Alamo Bowl	UCLA	40	Kansas State	35
2014	Jan 2, 2015	Cactus Bowl	Oklahoma State	30	Washington	22
2014	Jan 1, 2015	Cotton Bowl	Michigan State	42	Baylor	41
2014	Dec 31, 2014	Peach Bowl	TCU	42	Ole Miss	3
2014	Dec 29, 2014	Liberty Bowl	Texas A&M	45	West Virginia	37
2014	Dec 29, 2014	Russell Athletic Bowl	Clemson	40	Oklahoma	6
2014	Dec 29, 2014	Texas Bowl	Arkansas	31	Texas	7
2013	Jan 3, 2014	Cotton Bowl	Missouri	41	Oklahoma State	31
2013	Jan 2, 2014	Sugar Bowl	Oklahoma	45	Alabama	31
2013	Jan 1, 2014	Fiesta Bowl	Central Florida	52	Baylor	42
2013	Dec 30, 2013	Alamo Bowl	Oregon	30	Texas	7
2013	Dec 30, 2013	Holiday Bowl	Texas Tech	37	Arizona State	23
2013	Dec 28, 2013	Buffalo Wild Wings Bowl	Kansas State	31	Michigan	14
2012	Jan 4, 2013	Cotton Bowl	Texas A&M	41	Oklahoma	13
2012	Jan 3, 2013	Fiesta Bowl	Oregon	35	Kansas State	17
2012	Jan 1, 2013	Heart of Dallas Bowl	Oklahoma State	58	Purdue	14
2012	Dec 31, 2012	Liberty Bowl	Tulsa	31	Iowa State	17
2012	Dec 29, 2012	Alamo Bowl	Texas	31	Oregon State	27
2012	Dec 29, 2012	Buffalo Wild Wings Bowl	Michigan State	17	TCU	16
2012	Dec 29, 2012	Pinstripe Bowl	Syracuse	38	West Virginia	14
2012	Dec 28, 2012	Meineke Car Care Bowl of Texas	Texas Tech	34	Minnesota	31
2012	Dec 27, 2012	Holiday Bowl	Baylor	49	UCLA	26
2011	Jan 6, 2012	Cotton Bowl	Arkansas	29	Kansas State	16
2011	Jan 2, 2012	Fiesta Bowl	Oklahoma State	41	Stanford	38
2011	Dec 31, 2011	Meineke Car Care Bowl of Texas	Texas A&M	33	Northwestern	22
2011	Dec 30, 2011	Insight Bowl	Oklahoma	31	Iowa	14
2011	Dec 30, 2011	Pinstripe Bowl	Rutgers	27	Iowa State	13
2011	Dec 29, 2011	Alamo Bowl	Baylor	67	Washington	56
2011	Dec 28, 2011	Holiday Bowl	Texas	21	California	10
2011	Dec 26, 2011	Independence Bowl	Missouri	41	North Carolina	24
2010	Jan 7, 2011	Cotton Bowl	LSU	41	Texas A&M	24
2010	Jan 1, 2011	Fiesta Bowl	Oklahoma	48	Connecticut	20
2010	Jan 1, 2011	Ticket City Bowl	Texas Tech	45	Northwestern	38
2010	Dec 30, 2010	Holiday Bowl	Washington	19	Nebraska	7
2010	Dec 30, 2010	Pinstripe Bowl	Syracuse	36	Kansas State	34
2010	Dec 29, 2010	Alamo Bowl	Oklahoma State	36	Arizona	10
2010	Dec 29, 2010	Texas Bowl	Illinois	38	Baylor	14
2010	Dec 28, 2010	Insight Bowl	Iowa	27	Missouri	24
2009	Jan 7, 2010	BCS Championship	Alabama	37	Texas	21
2009	Jan 2, 2010	Alamo Bowl	Texas Tech	41	Michigan State	31
2009	Jan 2, 2010	Cotton Bowl	Ole Miss	21	Oklahoma State	7
2009	Dec 31, 2009	Insight Bowl	Iowa State	14	Minnesota	13
2009	Dec 31, 2009	Sun Bowl	Oklahoma	31	Stanford	27
2009	Dec 31, 2009	Texas Bowl	Navy	35	Missouri	13
2009	Dec 30, 2009	Holiday Bowl	Nebraska	33	Arizona	0
2009	Dec 28, 2009	Independence Bowl	Georgia	44	Texas A&M	20
2008	Jan 8, 2009	BCS Championship	Florida	24	Oklahoma	14
2008	Jan 5, 2009	Fiesta Bowl	Texas	24	Ohio State	21
2008	Jan 2, 2009	Cotton Bowl	Ole Miss	47	Texas Tech	34
2008	Jan 1, 2009	Gator Bowl	Nebraska	26	Clemson	21
2008	Dec 31, 2008	Insight Bowl	Kansas	42	Minnesota	21
2008	Dec 30, 2008	Holiday Bowl	Oregon	42	Oklahoma State	31
2008	Dec 29, 2008	Alamo Bowl	Missouri	30	Northwestern	23
2007	Jan 3, 2008	Orange Bowl	Kansas	24	Virginia Tech	21
2007	Jan 2, 2008	Fiesta Bowl	West Virginia	48	Oklahoma	28
2007	Jan 1, 2008	Cotton Bowl	Missouri	38	Arkansas	7
2007	Jan 1, 2008	Gator Bowl	Texas Tech	31	Virginia	28
2007	Dec 31, 2007	Insight Bowl	Oklahoma State	49	Indiana	33
2007	Dec 30, 2007	Independence Bowl	Alabama	30	Colorado	24
2007	Dec 29, 2007	Alamo Bowl	Penn State	24	Texas A&M	17
2007	Dec 27, 2007	Holiday Bowl	Texas	52	Arizona State	34
2006	Jan 1, 2007	Cotton Bowl	Auburn	17	Nebraska	14
2006	Jan 1, 2007	Fiesta Bowl	Boise State	43	Oklahoma	42
2006	Dec 30, 2006	Alamo Bowl	Texas	26	Iowa	24
2006	Dec 29, 2006	Insight Bowl	Texas Tech	44	Minnesota	41
2006	Dec 29, 2006	Sun Bowl	Oregon State	39	Missouri	38
2006	Dec 28, 2006	Holiday Bowl	California	45	Texas A&M	10
2006	Dec 28, 2006	Independence Bowl	Oklahoma State	34	Alabama	31
2006	Dec 28, 2006	Texas Bowl	Rutgers	37	Kansas State	10
2005	Jan 4, 2006	Rose Bowl	Texas	41	Southern California	38
2005	Jan 2, 2006	Cotton Bowl	Alabama	13	Texas Tech	10
2005	Dec 31, 2005	Houston Bowl	TCU	27	Iowa State	24
2005	Dec 30, 2005	Independence Bowl	Missouri	38	South Carolina	31
2005	Dec 29, 2005	Holiday Bowl	Oklahoma	17	Oregon	14
2005	Dec 28, 2005	Alamo Bowl	Nebraska	32	Michigan	28
2005	Dec 27, 2005	Champs Sports Bowl	Clemson	19	Colorado	10
2005	Dec 23, 2005	Fort Worth Bowl	Kansas	42	Houston	13
2004	Jan 4, 2005	Orange Bowl	Southern California	55	Oklahoma	19
2004	Jan 1, 2005	Cotton Bowl	Tennessee	38	Texas A&M	7
2004	Jan 1, 2005	Rose Bowl	Texas	38	Michigan	37
2004	Dec 30, 2004	Holiday Bowl	Texas Tech	45	California	31
2004	Dec 29, 2004	Alamo Bowl	Ohio State	33	Oklahoma State	7
2004	Dec 29, 2004	Houston Bowl	Colorado	33	Texas-El Paso	28
2004	Dec 28, 2004	Independence Bowl	Iowa State	17	Miami (OH)	13
2003	Jan 4, 2004	Sugar Bowl	LSU	21	Oklahoma	14
2003	Jan 2, 2004	Cotton Bowl	Ole Miss	31	Oklahoma State	28
2003	Jan 2, 2004	Fiesta Bowl	Ohio State	35	Kansas State	28
2003	Dec 31, 2003	Independence Bowl	Arkansas	27	Missouri	14
2003	Dec 30, 2003	Holiday Bowl	Washington State	28	Texas	20
2003	Dec 30, 2003	Houston Bowl	Texas Tech	38	Navy	14
2003	Dec 29, 2003	Alamo Bowl	Nebraska	17	Michigan State	3
2003	Dec 22, 2003	Tangerine Bowl	North Carolina State	56	Kansas	26
2002	Jan 1, 2003	Cotton Bowl	Texas	35	LSU	20
2002	Jan 1, 2003	Rose Bowl	Oklahoma	34	Washington State	14
2002	Dec 31, 2002	Humanitarian Bowl	Boise State	34	Iowa State	16
2002	Dec 28, 2002	Alamo Bowl	Wisconsin	31	Colorado	28
2002	Dec 27, 2002	Holiday Bowl	Kansas State	34	Arizona State	27
2002	Dec 27, 2002	Houston Bowl	Oklahoma State	33	Southern Mississippi	23
2002	Dec 27, 2002	Independence Bowl	Ole Miss	27	Nebraska	23
2002	Dec 23, 2002	Tangerine Bowl	Texas Tech	55	Clemson	15
2001	Jan 3, 2002	Rose Bowl	Miami (FL)	37	Nebraska	14
2001	Jan 1, 2002	Cotton Bowl	Oklahoma	10	Arkansas	3
2001	Jan 1, 2002	Fiesta Bowl	Oregon	38	Colorado	16
2001	Dec 29, 2001	Alamo Bowl	Iowa	19	Texas Tech	16
2001	Dec 29, 2001	Insight Bowl	Syracuse	26	Kansas State	3
2001	Dec 28, 2001	Gallery Furniture Bowl	Texas A&M	28	TCU	9
2001	Dec 28, 2001	Holiday Bowl	Texas	47	Washington	43
2001	Dec 27, 2001	Independence Bowl	Alabama	14	Iowa State	13
2000	Jan 3, 2001	Orange Bowl	Oklahoma	13	Florida State	2
2000	Jan 1, 2001	Cotton Bowl	Kansas State	35	Tennessee	21
2000	Dec 31, 2000	Independence Bowl	Mississippi State	43	Texas A&M	41
2000	Dec 30, 2000	Alamo Bowl	Nebraska	66	Northwestern	17
2000	Dec 29, 2000	Holiday Bowl	Oregon	35	Texas	30
2000	Dec 28, 2000	Insight Bowl	Iowa State	37	Pittsburgh	29
2000	Dec 27, 2000	Gallery Furniture Bowl	East Carolina	40	Texas Tech	27
1999	Jan 2, 2000	Fiesta Bowl	Nebraska	31	Tennessee	21
1999	Jan 1, 2000	Cotton Bowl	Arkansas	27	Texas	6
1999	Dec 31, 1999	Independence Bowl	Ole Miss	27	Oklahoma	25
1999	Dec 31, 1999	Insight Bowl	Colorado	62	Boston College	28
1999	Dec 29, 1999	Holiday Bowl	Kansas State	24	Washington	20
1999	Dec 28, 1999	Alamo Bowl	Penn State	24	Texas A&M	0
1998	Jan 1, 1999	Cotton Bowl	Texas	38	Mississippi State	11
1998	Jan 1, 1999	Sugar Bowl	Ohio State	24	Texas A&M	14
1998	Dec 31, 1998	Independence Bowl	Ole Miss	35	Texas Tech	18
1998	Dec 30, 1998	Holiday Bowl	Arizona	23	Nebraska	20
1998	Dec 29, 1998	Alamo Bowl	Purdue	37	Kansas State	34
1998	Dec 26, 1998	Insight Bowl	Missouri	34	West Virginia	31
1998	Dec 25, 1998	Aloha Classic	Colorado	51	Oregon	43
1997	Jan 2, 1998	Orange Bowl	Nebraska	42	Tennessee	17
1997	Jan 1, 1998	Cotton Bowl	UCLA	29	Texas A&M	23
1997	Dec 31, 1997	Fiesta Bowl	Kansas State	35	Syracuse	18
1997	Dec 30, 1997	Alamo Bowl	Purdue	33	Oklahoma State	20
1997	Dec 29, 1997	Holiday Bowl	Colorado State	35	Missouri	24
1996	Jan 1, 1997	Cotton Bowl	BYU	19	Kansas State	15
1996	Jan 1, 1997	Fiesta Bowl	Penn State	38	Texas	15
1996	Dec 31, 1996	Orange Bowl	Nebraska	41	Virginia Tech	21
1996	Dec 30, 1996	Holiday Bowl	Colorado	33	Washington	21
1996	Dec 29, 1996	Alamo Bowl	Iowa	27	Texas Tech	0

== Final standings ==
1996 Big 12 Conference football standings
	Conf.			Overall
Team	W		L	W		L
North Division
No. 6 Nebraska x%	8	–	0	11	–	2
No. 8 Colorado	7	–	1	10	–	2
No. 17 Kansas State	6	–	2	9	–	3
Missouri	3	–	5	5	–	6
Kansas	2	–	6	4	–	7
Iowa State	1	–	7	2	–	9
South Division
No. 23 Texas x$	6	–	2	8	–	5
Texas Tech	5	–	3	7	–	5
Texas A&M	4	–	4	6	–	6
Oklahoma	3	–	5	3	–	8
Oklahoma State	2	–	6	5	–	6
Baylor	1	–	7	4	–	7
Championship: Texas 37, Nebraska 27
x – Division champion/co-champions; $ – Bowl Alliance representative as champion % – Bowl Alliance at-large representative; Rankings from AP Poll

1997 Big 12 Conference football standings
	Conf.			Overall
Team	W		L	W		L
North Division
No. 2 Nebraska † xy$	8	–	0	13	–	0
No. 8 Kansas State %	7	–	1	11	–	1
No. 23 Missouri	5	–	3	7	–	5
Colorado	3	–	5	5	–	6
Kansas	3	–	5	5	–	6
Iowa State	1	–	7	1	–	10
South Division
No. 20 Texas A&M xy	6	–	2	9	–	4
No. 24 Oklahoma State	5	–	3	8	–	4
Texas Tech	5	–	3	6	–	5
Texas	2	–	6	4	–	7
Oklahoma	2	–	6	4	–	8
Baylor	1	–	7	2	–	9
Championship: Nebraska 54, Texas A&M 15
x – Division champion/co-champions; y – Championship game participant; † – Coaches Poll national champion $ – Bowl Alliance representative as champion % – Bowl Alliance at-large representative; Rankings from AP Poll

1998 Big 12 Conference football standings
	Conf.			Overall
Team	W		L	W		L
North Division
No. 10 Kansas State x	8	–	0	11	–	2
No. 19 Nebraska	5	–	3	9	–	4
No. 21 Missouri	5	–	3	8	–	4
Colorado	4	–	4	8	–	4
Kansas	1	–	7	4	–	7
Iowa State	1	–	7	3	–	8
South Division
No. 11 Texas A&M x$	7	–	1	11	–	3
No. 15 Texas	6	–	2	9	–	3
Texas Tech	4	–	4	7	–	5
Oklahoma State	3	–	5	5	–	6
Oklahoma	3	–	5	5	–	6
Baylor	1	–	7	2	–	9
Championship: Texas A&M 36, Kansas State 33
$ – BCS representative as conference champion; x – Division champion/co-champions; Rankings from AP Poll

1999 Big 12 Conference football standings
	Conf.			Overall
Team	W		L	W		L
North Division
No. 3 Nebraska xy$	7	–	1	12	–	1
No. 6 Kansas State x	7	–	1	11	–	1
Colorado	5	–	3	7	–	5
Kansas	3	–	5	5	–	7
Iowa State	1	–	7	4	–	7
Missouri	1	–	7	4	–	7
South Division
No. 21 Texas xy	6	–	2	9	–	5
Oklahoma	5	–	3	7	–	5
Texas Tech	5	–	3	6	–	5
No. 23 Texas A&M	5	–	3	8	–	4
Oklahoma State	3	–	5	5	–	6
Baylor	0	–	8	1	–	10
Championship: Nebraska 22, Texas 6
$ – BCS representative as conference champion; x – Division champion/co-champions; y – Championship game participant; Rankings from AP Poll

2000 Big 12 Conference football standings
	Conf.			Overall
Team	W		L	W		L
North Division
No. 9 Kansas State xy	6	–	2	11	–	3
No. 8 Nebraska x	6	–	2	10	–	2
No. 25 Iowa State	5	–	3	9	–	3
Colorado	3	–	5	3	–	8
Kansas	2	–	6	4	–	7
Missouri	2	–	6	3	–	8
South Division
No. 1 Oklahoma x$#	8	–	0	13	–	0
No. 12 Texas	7	–	1	9	–	3
Texas A&M	5	–	3	7	–	5
Texas Tech	3	–	5	7	–	6
Oklahoma State	1	–	7	3	–	8
Baylor	0	–	8	2	–	9
Championship: Oklahoma 27, Kansas State 24
# – BCS National Champion; $ – BCS representative as conference champion; x – Division champion/co-champions; y – Championship game participant; Rankings from AP Poll

2001 Big 12 Conference football standings
	Conf.			Overall
Team	W		L	W		L
North Division
No. 9 Colorado xy$	7	–	1	10	–	3
No. 8 Nebraska x%	7	–	1	11	–	2
Iowa State	4	–	4	7	–	5
Kansas State	3	–	5	6	–	6
Missouri	3	–	5	4	–	7
Kansas	1	–	7	3	–	8
South Division
No. 5 Texas xy	7	–	1	11	–	2
No. 6 Oklahoma	6	–	2	11	–	2
Texas Tech	4	–	4	7	–	5
Texas A&M	4	–	4	8	–	4
Oklahoma State	2	–	6	4	–	7
Baylor	0	–	8	3	–	8
Championship: Colorado 39, Texas 37
$ – BCS representative as conference champion; % – BCS at-large representative; x – Division champion/co-champions; y – Championship game participant; Rankings from AP Poll

2002 Big 12 Conference football standings
	Conf.			Overall
Team	W		L	W		L
North Division
No. 20 Colorado xy	7	–	1	9	–	5
No. 7 Kansas State	6	–	2	11	–	2
Iowa State	4	–	4	7	–	7
Nebraska	3	–	5	7	–	7
Missouri	2	–	6	5	–	7
Kansas	0	–	8	2	–	10
South Division
No. 5 Oklahoma xy$	6	–	2	12	–	2
No. 6 Texas x	6	–	2	11	–	2
Texas Tech	5	–	3	9	–	5
Oklahoma State	5	–	3	8	–	5
Texas A&M	3	–	5	6	–	6
Baylor	1	–	7	3	–	9
Championship: Oklahoma 29, Colorado 7
$ – BCS representative as conference champion; x – Division champion/co-champions; y – Championship game participant; Rankings from AP Poll

2003 Big 12 Conference football standings
	Conf.			Overall
Team	W		L	W		L
North Division
No. 14 Kansas State x$	6	–	2	11	–	4
No. 19 Nebraska	5	–	3	10	–	3
Missouri	4	–	4	8	–	5
Kansas	3	–	5	6	–	7
Colorado	3	–	5	5	–	7
Iowa State	0	–	8	2	–	10
South Division
No. 3 Oklahoma x%	8	–	0	12	–	2
No. 12 Texas	7	–	1	10	–	3
Oklahoma State	5	–	3	9	–	4
Texas Tech	4	–	4	8	–	5
Texas A&M	2	–	6	4	–	8
Baylor	1	–	7	3	–	9
Championship: Kansas State 35, Oklahoma 7
$ – BCS representative as conference champion; % – BCS at-large representative; x – Division champion/co-champions; Rankings from AP Poll

2004 Big 12 Conference football standings
	Conf.			Overall
Team	W		L	W		L
North Division
Colorado xy	4	–	4	8	–	5
Iowa State x	4	–	4	7	–	5
Nebraska	3	–	5	5	–	6
Missouri	3	–	5	5	–	6
Kansas	2	–	6	4	–	7
Kansas State	2	–	6	4	–	7
South Division
No. 3 Oklahoma xy$	8	–	0	12	–	1
No. 5 Texas %	7	–	1	11	–	1
Texas A&M	5	–	3	7	–	5
No. 18 Texas Tech	5	–	3	8	–	4
Oklahoma State	4	–	4	7	–	5
Baylor	1	–	7	3	–	8
Championship: Oklahoma 42, Colorado 3
$ – BCS representative as conference champion; % – BCS at-large representative; x – Division champion/co-champions; y – Championship game participant; Rankings from AP Poll

2005 Big 12 Conference football standings
	Conf.			Overall
Team	W		L	W		L
North Division
Colorado x	5	–	3	7	–	6
No. 24 Nebraska	4	–	4	8	–	4
Missouri	4	–	4	7	–	5
Iowa State	4	–	4	7	–	5
Kansas	3	–	5	7	–	5
Kansas State	2	–	6	5	–	6
South Division
No. 1 Texas x$#	8	–	0	13	–	0
No. 20 Texas Tech	6	–	2	9	–	3
No. 22 Oklahoma	6	–	2	8	–	4
Texas A&M	3	–	5	5	–	6
Baylor	2	–	6	5	–	6
Oklahoma State	1	–	7	4	–	7
Championship: Texas 70, Colorado 3
# – BCS National Champion; $ – BCS representative as conference champion; x – Division champion/co-champions; Rankings from AP Poll

2006 Big 12 Conference football standings
	Conf.			Overall
Team	W		L	W		L
North Division
Nebraska x	6	–	2	9	–	5
Missouri	4	–	4	8	–	5
Kansas State	4	–	4	7	–	6
Kansas	3	–	5	6	–	6
Colorado	2	–	6	2	–	10
Iowa State	1	–	7	4	–	8
South Division
No. 11 Oklahoma x$	7	–	1	11	–	3
No. 13 Texas	6	–	2	10	–	3
Texas A&M	5	–	3	9	–	4
Texas Tech	4	–	4	8	–	5
Oklahoma State	3	–	5	7	–	6
Baylor	3	–	5	4	–	8
Championship: Oklahoma 21, Nebraska 7
$ – BCS representative as conference champion; x – Division champion/co-champions; Rankings from AP Poll

2007 Big 12 Conference football standings
	Conf.			Overall
Team	W		L	W		L
North Division
No. 4 Missouri xy	7	–	1	12	–	2
No. 7 Kansas x%	7	–	1	12	–	1
Colorado	4	–	4	6	–	7
Kansas State	3	–	5	5	–	7
Nebraska	2	–	6	5	–	7
Iowa State	2	–	6	3	–	9
South Division
No. 8 Oklahoma xy$	6	–	2	11	–	3
No. 10 Texas	5	–	3	10	–	3
No. 22 Texas Tech	4	–	4	9	–	4
Oklahoma State	4	–	4	7	–	6
Texas A&M	4	–	4	7	–	6
Baylor	0	–	8	3	–	9
Championship: Oklahoma 38, Missouri 17
$ – BCS representative as conference champion; % – BCS at-large representative; x – Division champion/co-champions; y – Championship game participant; Rankings from AP Poll

2008 Big 12 Conference football standings
	Conf.			Overall
Team	W		L	W		L
North Division
No. 19 Missouri xy	5	–	3	10	–	4
Nebraska x	5	–	3	9	–	4
Kansas	4	–	4	8	–	5
Colorado	2	–	6	5	–	7
Kansas State	2	–	6	5	–	7
Iowa State	0	–	8	2	–	10
South Division
No. 5 Oklahoma xy$	7	–	1	12	–	2
No. 4 Texas x%	7	–	1	12	–	1
No. 12 Texas Tech x	7	–	1	11	–	2
No. 16 Oklahoma State	5	–	3	9	–	4
Baylor	2	–	6	4	–	8
Texas A&M	2	–	6	4	–	8
Championship: Oklahoma 62, Missouri 21
$ – BCS representative as conference champion; % – BCS at-large representative; x – Division champion/co-champions; y – Championship game participant; Rankings from AP Poll

2009 Big 12 Conference football standings
	Conf.			Overall
Team	W		L	W		L
North Division
No. 14 Nebraska x	6	–	2	10	–	4
Missouri	4	–	4	8	–	5
Kansas State	4	–	4	6	–	6
Iowa State	3	–	5	7	–	6
Colorado	2	–	6	3	–	9
Kansas	1	–	7	5	–	7
South Division
No. 2 Texas x$	8	–	0	13	–	1
Oklahoma State	6	–	2	9	–	4
No. 21 Texas Tech	5	–	3	9	–	4
Oklahoma	5	–	3	8	–	5
Texas A&M	3	–	5	6	–	7
Baylor	1	–	7	4	–	8
Championship: Texas 13, Nebraska 12
$ – BCS representative as conference champion; x – Division champion/co-champions; Rankings from AP Poll

2010 Big 12 Conference football standings
	Conf.			Overall
Team	W		L	W		L
North Division
No. 20 Nebraska xy	6	–	2	10	–	4
No. 18 Missouri x	6	–	2	10	–	3
Kansas State	3	–	5	7	–	6
Iowa State	3	–	5	5	–	7
Colorado	2	–	6	5	–	7
Kansas	1	–	7	3	–	9
South Division
No. 6 Oklahoma xy$	6	–	2	12	–	2
No. 13 Oklahoma State x	6	–	2	11	–	2
No. 19 Texas A&M x	6	–	2	9	–	4
Baylor	4	–	4	7	–	6
Texas Tech	3	–	5	8	–	5
Texas	2	–	6	5	–	7
Championship: Oklahoma 23, Nebraska 20
$ – BCS representative as conference champion; x – Division champion/co-champions; y – Championship game participant; Rankings from AP Poll

2011 Big 12 Conference football standings
	Conf.			Overall
Team	W		L	W		L
No. 3 Oklahoma State $	8	–	1	12	–	1
No. 15 Kansas State	7	–	2	10	–	3
No. 13 Baylor	6	–	3	10	–	3
No. 16 Oklahoma	6	–	3	10	–	3
Missouri	5	–	4	8	–	5
Texas	4	–	5	8	–	5
Texas A&M	4	–	5	7	–	6
Iowa State	3	–	6	6	–	7
Texas Tech	2	–	7	5	–	7
Kansas	0	–	9	2	–	10
$ – BCS representative as conference champion; Rankings from AP Poll

2012 Big 12 Conference football standings
	Conf.			Overall
Team	W		L	W		L
No. 12 Kansas State $+	8	–	1	11	–	2
No. 15 Oklahoma +	8	–	1	10	–	3
No. 19 Texas	5	–	4	9	–	4
Oklahoma State	5	–	4	8	–	5
Baylor	4	–	5	8	–	5
TCU	4	–	5	7	–	6
Texas Tech	4	–	5	8	–	5
West Virginia	4	–	5	7	–	6
Iowa State	3	–	6	6	–	7
Kansas	0	–	9	1	–	11
$ – BCS representative as conference champion; + – Conference co-champions; Rankings from AP Poll

2013 Big 12 Conference football standings
	Conf.			Overall
Team	W		L	W		L
No. 13 Baylor $	8	–	1	11	–	2
No. 6 Oklahoma %	7	–	2	11	–	2
No. 17 Oklahoma State	7	–	2	10	–	3
Texas	7	–	2	8	–	5
Kansas State	5	–	4	8	–	5
Texas Tech	4	–	5	8	–	5
TCU	2	–	7	4	–	8
West Virginia	2	–	7	4	–	8
Iowa State	2	–	7	3	–	9
Kansas	1	–	8	3	–	9
$ – BCS representative as conference champion; % – BCS at-large representative; Rankings from AP Poll

2014 Big 12 Conference football standings
	Conf.				Overall
Team	W		L		W		L
No. 7 Baylor +	8	–	1		11	–	2
No. 3 TCU	–	8	–	1	12	–	1
No. 18 Kansas State	7	–	2		9	–	4
Oklahoma	5	–	4		8	–	5
West Virginia	5	–	4		7	–	6
Texas	5	–	4		6	–	7
Oklahoma State	4	–	5		7	–	6
Texas Tech	2	–	7		4	–	8
Kansas	1	–	8		3	–	9
Iowa State	0	–	9		2	–	10
Rankings from AP Poll

2015 Big 12 Conference football standings
	Conf.			Overall
Team	W		L	W		L
No. 5 Oklahoma $^	8	–	1	11	–	2
No. 20 Oklahoma State	7	–	2	10	–	3
No. 7 TCU	7	–	2	11	–	2
No. 13 Baylor	6	–	3	10	–	3
West Virginia	4	–	5	8	–	5
Texas Tech	4	–	5	7	–	6
Texas	4	–	5	5	–	7
Kansas State	3	–	6	6	–	7
Iowa State	2	–	7	3	–	9
Kansas	0	–	9	0	–	12
^ – College Football Playoff participant; $ – Conference champion; Rankings from AP Poll

2016 Big 12 Conference football standings
	Conf.			Overall
Team	W		L	W		L
No. 5 Oklahoma $	9	–	0	11	–	2
No. 11 Oklahoma State	7	–	2	10	–	3
No. 18 West Virginia	7	–	2	10	–	3
Kansas State	6	–	3	9	–	4
TCU	4	–	5	6	–	7
Baylor	3	–	6	7	–	6
Texas	3	–	6	5	–	7
Texas Tech	3	–	6	5	–	7
Iowa State	2	–	7	3	–	9
Kansas	1	–	8	2	–	10
$ – Conference champion; Rankings from AP Poll

2017 Big 12 Conference football standings
	Conf.			Overall
Team	W		L	W		L
No. 3 Oklahoma y$^	8	–	1	12	–	2
No. 9 TCU y	7	–	2	11	–	3
No. 14 Oklahoma State	6	–	3	10	–	3
Texas	5	–	4	7	–	6
West Virginia	5	–	4	7	–	6
Kansas State	5	–	4	8	–	5
Iowa State	5	–	4	8	–	5
Texas Tech	3	–	6	6	–	7
Baylor	1	–	8	1	–	11
Kansas	0	–	9	1	–	11
Championship: Oklahoma 41, TCU 17
^ – College Football Playoff participant; $ – Conference champion; y – Championship game participant; Rankings from AP Poll

2018 Big 12 Conference football standings
	Conf.			Overall
Team	W		L	W		L
No. 4 Oklahoma y$^	8	–	1	12	–	2
No. 9 Texas y	7	–	2	10	–	4
Iowa State	6	–	3	8	–	5
No. 20 West Virginia	6	–	3	8	–	4
TCU	4	–	5	7	–	6
Baylor	4	–	5	7	–	6
Oklahoma State	3	–	6	7	–	6
Kansas State	3	–	6	5	–	7
Texas Tech	3	–	6	5	–	7
Kansas	1	–	8	3	–	9
Championship: Oklahoma 39, Texas 27
^ – College Football Playoff participant; $ – Conference champion; y – Championship game participant; Rankings from AP Poll

2019 Big 12 Conference football standings
	Conf.			Overall
Team	W		L	W		L
No. 7 Oklahoma y$^	8	–	1	12	–	2
No. 13 Baylor y	8	–	1	11	–	3
No. 25 Texas	5	–	4	8	–	5
Oklahoma State	5	–	4	8	–	5
Kansas State	5	–	4	8	–	5
Iowa State	5	–	4	7	–	6
West Virginia	3	–	6	5	–	7
TCU	3	–	6	5	–	7
Texas Tech	2	–	7	4	–	8
Kansas	1	–	8	3	–	9
Championship: Oklahoma 30, Baylor 23 ^{OT}
^ – College Football Playoff participant; $ – Conference champion; y – Championship game participant; Rankings from AP Poll

2020 Big 12 Conference football standings
	Conf.			Overall
Team	W		L	W		L
No. 9 Iowa State y	8	–	1	9	–	3
No. 6 Oklahoma y$	6	–	2	9	–	2
No. 20 Oklahoma State	6	–	3	8	–	3
No. 19 Texas	5	–	3	7	–	3
TCU	5	–	4	6	–	4
West Virginia	4	–	4	6	–	4
Kansas State	4	–	5	4	–	6
Texas Tech	3	–	6	4	–	6
Baylor	2	–	7	2	–	7
Kansas	0	–	8	0	–	9
Championship: Oklahoma 27, Iowa State 21
$ – Conference champion; y – Championship game participant; Rankings from AP Poll.

2021 Big 12 Conference football standings
	Conf.			Overall
Team	W		L	W		L
No. 7 Oklahoma State y	8	–	1	12	–	2
No. 5 Baylor y$	7	–	2	12	–	2
No. 10 Oklahoma	7	–	2	11	–	2
Iowa State	5	–	4	7	–	6
Kansas State	4	–	5	8	–	5
West Virginia	4	–	5	6	–	7
Texas	3	–	6	5	–	7
TCU	3	–	6	5	–	7
Texas Tech	3	–	6	7	–	6
Kansas	1	–	8	2	–	10
Championship: Baylor 21, Oklahoma State 16
$ – Conference champion; y – Championship game participant; Rankings from AP Poll

2022 Big 12 Conference football standings
	Conf.			Overall
Team	W		L	W		L
No. 2 TCU y^	9	–	0	13	–	2
No. 14 Kansas State y$	7	–	2	10	–	4
No. 25 Texas	6	–	3	8	–	5
Texas Tech	5	–	4	8	–	5
Oklahoma State	4	–	5	7	–	6
Baylor	4	–	5	6	–	7
Oklahoma	3	–	6	6	–	7
Kansas	3	–	6	6	–	7
West Virginia	3	–	6	5	–	7
Iowa State	1	–	8	4	–	8
Championship: Kansas State 31, TCU 28 ^{OT}
^ – College Football Playoff participant; $ – Conference champion; y – Championship game participant; Rankings from AP Poll

2023 Big 12 Conference football standings
	Conf.			Overall
Team	W		L	W		L
No. 3 Texas y$^	8	–	1	12	–	2
No. 16 Oklahoma State y	7	–	2	10	–	4
No. 15 Oklahoma	7	–	2	10	–	3
Iowa State	6	–	3	7	–	6
No. 18 Kansas State	6	–	3	9	–	4
West Virginia	6	–	3	9	–	4
Texas Tech	5	–	4	7	–	6
No. 23 Kansas	5	–	4	9	–	4
UCF	3	–	6	6	–	7
TCU	3	–	6	5	–	7
Houston	2	–	7	4	–	8
BYU	2	–	7	5	–	7
Baylor	2	–	7	3	–	9
Cincinnati	1	–	8	3	–	9
Championship: Texas 49, Oklahoma State 21
^ – College Football Playoff participant; $ – Conference champion; y – Championship game participant; Rankings from AP Poll

2024 Big 12 Conference football standings
	Conf.			Overall
Team	W		L	W		L
No. 7 Arizona State y$^	7	–	2	11	–	3
No. 15 Iowa State y	7	–	2	11	–	3
No. 13 BYU	7	–	2	11	–	2
No. 25 Colorado	7	–	2	9	–	4
Baylor	6	–	3	8	–	5
TCU	6	–	3	9	–	4
Texas Tech	6	–	3	8	–	5
Kansas State	5	–	4	9	–	4
West Virginia	5	–	4	6	–	7
Kansas	4	–	5	5	–	7
Cincinnati	3	–	6	5	–	7
Houston	3	–	6	4	–	8
Utah	2	–	7	5	–	7
UCF	2	–	7	4	–	8
Arizona	2	–	7	4	–	8
Oklahoma State	0	–	9	3	–	9
Championship: Arizona State 45, Iowa State 19
^ – College Football Playoff participant; $ – Conference champion; y – Championship game participant; Rankings from AP Poll

2025 Big 12 Conference football standings
	Conf.			Overall
Team	W		L	W		L
No. 7 Texas Tech y$^	8	–	1	12	–	2
No. 11 BYU y	8	–	1	12	–	2
No. 14 Utah	7	–	2	11	–	2
No. 22 Houston	6	–	3	10	–	3
Arizona	6	–	3	9	–	4
Arizona State	6	–	3	8	–	5
No. 25 TCU	5	–	4	9	–	4
Iowa State	5	–	4	8	–	4
Cincinnati	5	–	4	7	–	6
Kansas State	5	–	4	6	–	6
Baylor	3	–	6	5	–	7
Kansas	3	–	6	5	–	7
UCF	2	–	7	5	–	7
West Virginia	2	–	7	4	–	8
Colorado	1	–	8	3	–	9
Oklahoma State	0	–	9	1	–	11
Championship: Texas Tech 34, BYU 7
^ – College Football Playoff participant; $ – Conference champion; y – Championship game participant; Rankings from AP Poll

== Records ==
=== Overall series records ===
Records are while teams are members of the Big 12 conference only.

	Arizona	Arizona State	Baylor	BYU	Cincinnati	Colorado	Houston	Iowa State	Kansas	Kansas State	Oklahoma State	TCU	Texas Tech	UCF	Utah	West Virginia
vs. Arizona	—	0–0	0–0	0–0	0–0	0–0	0–0	0–0	0–0	0–0	0–0	0–0	0–0	0–0	0–0	0–0
vs. Arizona State	0–0	—	0–0	0–0	0–0	0–0	0–0	0–0	0–0	0–0	0–0	0–0	0–0	0–0	0–0	0–0
vs. Baylor	0–0	0–0	—	0–0	0–1	4–3	1–0	10–11	3–16	11–10	20–8	9–3	18–10	0–1	0–0	8–4
vs. BYU	0–0	0–0	0–0	—	0–1	0–0	0–0	1–0	1–0	0–0	1–0	1–0	0–1	0–0	0–0	1–0
vs. Cincinnati	0–0	0–0	1–0	1–0	—	0–0	0–1	1–0	1–0	0–0	1–0	0–0	0–0	0–0	0–0	1–0
vs. Colorado	0–0	0–0	3–4	0–0	0–0	—	0–0	4–11	6–9	8–7	4–4	0–0	3–4	0–0	0–0	1–1
vs. Houston	0–0	0–0	0–1	0–0	1–0	0–0	—	0–0	0–0	1–0	1–0	1–0	1–0	1–0	0–0	0–1
vs. Iowa State	0–0	0–0	11–10	0–1	0–1	11–4	0–0	—	12–16	21–7	14–7	6–6	11–7	0–0	0–0	6–5
vs. Kansas	0–0	0–0	16–3	0–1	0–1	9–6	0–0	16–12	—	24–4	18–2	11–0	19–2	0–1	0–0	9–2
vs. Kansas State	0–0	0–0	10–11	0–0	0–0	7–8	0–1	7–21	4–24	—	11–9	5–8	6–15	0–1	0–0	5–6
vs. Oklahoma State	0–0	0–0	8–20	0–1	0–1	4–4	0–1	7–14	2–18	9–11	—	5–6	11–16	1–0	0–0	3–0
vs. TCU	0–0	0–0	3–9	0–1	0–0	0–0	0–1	6–6	0–11	8–5	6–5	—	4–7	0–0	0–0	6–6
vs. Texas Tech	0–0	0–0	10–18	1–0	0–0	4–3	0–1	7–11	2–19	15–6	16–11	7–4	—	0–1	0–0	6–6
vs. UCF	0–0	0–0	1–0	0–0	0–1	0–0	0–1	0–0	1–0	1–0	0–1	0–0	1–0	—	0–0	1–0
vs. Utah	0–0	0–0	0–0	0–0	0–0	0–0	0–0	0–0	0–0	0–0	0–0	0–0	0–0	0–0	—	0–0
vs. West Virginia	0–0	0–0	4–8	0–1	0–1	1–1	1–0	5–6	2–9	6–5	9–3	6–6	6–6	0–1	0–0	—
Reference: Through games of the 2023 Season

== Rivalries ==
Conference rivalries (primarily in football) mostly predate the conference. The Kansas-Missouri rivalry was the longest running, the longest west of the Mississippi and the second-longest in college football. It was played 119 times before Missouri left the Big 12. The Jayhawks and Tigers are scheduled to play for the first time since 2011 on September 6, 2025 in Columbia and meet again in Lawrence on September 12, 2026.

Several schools within the Big 12 also maintain rivalries with schools from other conferences. Iowa State plays the University of Iowa Football Team (the latter from the Big Ten Conference) in football each year for the "Cy-Hawk" trophy. Other rivalries include the Iron Skillet game between TCU and Southern Methodist University Football, or SMU (of the Atlantic Coast Conference-ACC); and the "War on I-4" between UCF and the University of South Florida Football Team, or USF (of the American Athletic Conference-AAC). However, the latter two rivalry games are no longer played on an annual basis, and are now considered dormant, due to conference realignment and scheduling difficulties.

=== Current ===
Rivalry	Name (Trophy)	Games played^{†}	Began
Arizona–Arizona State	Duel in the Desert (Territorial Cup)	97	1899
Baylor–TCU	The Bluebonnet Battle/The Revivalry	118	1899
Baylor–Texas Tech	Texas Farm Bureau Insurance Shootout	81	1929
BYU–Utah	Holy War (Beehive Boot)	101	1896
Cincinnati–UCF		8	2015
Cincinnati–West Virginia		20	1921
Colorado–Kansas State		66	1912
Colorado–Utah	Rumble in the Rockies	70	1903
Houston–Texas Tech		34	1951
Iowa State–Kansas State	Farmageddon	106	1917
Kansas–Kansas State	Sunflower Showdown (Governor's Cup)	120	1902
TCU–Texas Tech	West Texas Championship (Saddle Trophy)	65	1926

Totals through the end of the 2022 season.

=== Former ===
Rivalry	Name	Games played^{†}	Began	Last Meeting Before Interruption
Baylor–Texas A&M	Battle of the Brazos	108	1899	2011
Colorado–Nebraska		69	1898	2010
Iowa State–Missouri	(Telephone Trophy)	104	1896	2011
Kansas–Missouri	Border War (Indian War Drum)	120	1891	2011
Kansas–Nebraska		117	1892	2010
Missouri–Nebraska	(Victory Bell)	104	1892	2010
Missouri–Oklahoma	(Tiger–Sooner Peace Pipe)	96	1902	2011
Nebraska–Oklahoma		86	1912	2010
Oklahoma–Oklahoma State	Bedlam (Bedlam Bell)	118	1904	2023
Oklahoma–Texas	Red River Rivalry (Golden Hat)	119	1900	2023
Texas A&M–Texas Tech		70	1927	2011
Texas–Texas A&M	Lone Star Showdown (Lone Star Showdown Trophy)	118	1894	2011
Reference: ^{†Games played before interruption}
