= Mingardi =

Mingardi is a surname. Notable people with the surname include:

- Andrea Mingardi (born 1940), Italian singer-songwriter, composer, musician, author, and actor
- Camilla Mingardi (born 1997), Italian volleyball player
- Giovanni Battista Mingardi (died 1796), Italian painter

== See also ==
- Minardi (disambiguation)
