= Bullet (mascot) =

Horse

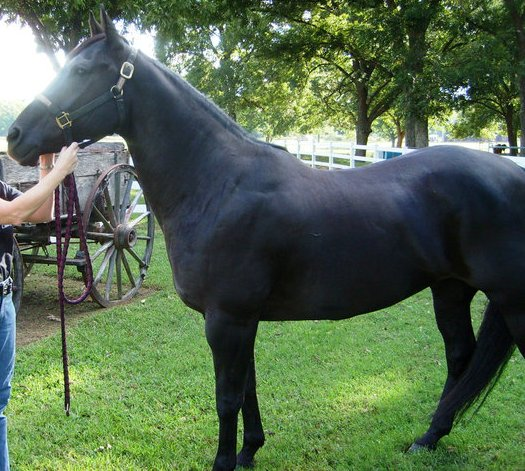
- Bullet III at his home ranch near Tulsa, OK in 2010
- University: Oklahoma State University
- Conference: Big 12
- Description: horse
- First seen: 1984

Bullet is the name of the horse that is ridden by the "Spirit Rider" at Oklahoma State University-Stillwater football games and other special events. Bullet was introduced as an Oklahoma State tradition in 1984 as part of the Spirit Rider Program. Bullet gallops out onto the football field at Boone Pickens Stadium, ridden by the Spirit Rider carrying an orange OSU flag, during the pre-game performance by the Cowboy Marching Band and after every Cowboy touchdown. The fifth horse used in the OSU Spirit Rider program, and the fourth horse to be named Bullet, has served in this role since 2019.

The first Spirit Rider horse, a black mare named Della, was owned by John Beall Jr., who served as the original Spirit Rider at OSU.
