= 2001 Kansas Jayhawks football team =

American college football season

2001 Kansas Jayhawks football
- Conference: Big 12 Conference
- North Division
- Record: 3–8 (1–7 Big 12)
- Head coach: Terry Allen (5th season; first 8 games); Tom Hayes (interim, final 3 games)
- Offensive coordinator: Rip Scherer (1st season)
- Defensive coordinator: Tom Hayes (1st season)
- Home stadium: Memorial Stadium

2001 Big 12 Conference football standings
	Conf.			Overall
Team	W		L	W		L
North Division
No. 9 Colorado xy$	7	–	1	10	–	3
No. 8 Nebraska x%	7	–	1	11	–	2
Iowa State	4	–	4	7	–	5
Kansas State	3	–	5	6	–	6
Missouri	3	–	5	4	–	7
Kansas	1	–	7	3	–	8
South Division
No. 5 Texas xy	7	–	1	11	–	2
No. 6 Oklahoma	6	–	2	11	–	2
Texas Tech	4	–	4	7	–	5
Texas A&M	4	–	4	8	–	4
Oklahoma State	2	–	6	4	–	7
Baylor	0	–	8	3	–	8
Championship: Colorado 39, Texas 37
$ – BCS representative as conference champion; % – BCS at-large representative; x – Division champion/co-champions; y – Championship game participant; Rankings from AP Poll

The 2001 Kansas Jayhawks football team represented the University of Kansas as a member of the North Division of the Big 12 Conference during the 2001 NCAA Division I-A football season. Led by Terry Allen in his fifth and final season as head coach, the Jayhawks compiled an overall record of 3–8 with a mark of 1–7 in conference play, tying for fifth place at the bottom of the Big 12's North Division standings. All was fired on November 4, after the eighth game of the season. Kansas State's defensive coordinator, Tom Hayes, was appointed interim head coach for the remainder of the year. The team played home games at Memorial Stadium in Lawrence, Kansas.

== Schedule ==
Date	Time	Opponent	Site	TV	Result	Attendance	Source
September 1	6:00 p.m.	SW Missouri State*	Memorial Stadium; Lawrence, KS		W 24–10	37,500	
September 8	11:30 a.m.	No. 17 UCLA*	Memorial Stadium; Lawrence, KS	FSN	L 17–41	43,500	
September 22	2:30 p.m.	at Colorado	Folsom Field; Boulder, CO		L 16–27	47,495	
October 6	7:00 p.m.	at Texas Tech	Jones SBC Stadium; Lubbock, TX		W 34–31 ^{2OT}	45,343	
October 13	6:00 p.m.	No. 3 Oklahoma^{†}	Memorial Stadium; Lawrence, KS	FSN	L 10–38	48,700	
October 20	1:00 p.m.	Missouri	Memorial Stadium; Lawrence, KS (Border War)		L 34–38	38,500	
October 27	2:30 p.m.	at Kansas State	KSU Stadium; Manhattan, KS (Sunflower Showdown)	PPV	L 6–40	50,101	
November 3	6:00 p.m.	No. 2 Nebraska	Memorial Stadium; Lawrence, KS (rivalry)	FSN	L 7–51	50,750	
November 10	11:30 a.m.	at No. 5 Texas	Darrell K Royal–Texas Memorial Stadium; Austin, TX		L 0–59	83,111	
November 17	11:30 a.m.	Iowa State	Memorial Stadium; Lawrence, KS	FSN	L 7–49	33,500	
November 24	1:00 p.m.	Wyoming*	Memorial Stadium; Lawrence, KS		W 27–14	24,000	
*Non-conference game; ^{†}Homecoming; Rankings from AP Poll released prior to the game; All times are in Central time

== Roster ==
2001 Kansas Jayhawks football team roster
Players			Coaches
Offense: Pos. / # / Name / Class; OT / 75 / Justin Hartwig / Sr	Defense: Pos. / # / Name / Class	Special teams: Pos. / # / Name / Class	Head coach: Tom Hayes; Coordinators/assistant coaches Legend: (C) Team captain; (S) Suspended; (I) Ineligible; Injured; Redshirt
