= 2005 Champs Sports Bowl =

American college football game

Clemson Tigers	Colorado Buffaloes
(7–4)	(7–5)
ACC	Big 12
19	10
Head coach: Tommy Bowden	Head coach: Mike Hankwitz
AP / Coaches / BCS; 23 / 23 / NR
	1	2	3	4	Total
Clemson	3	3	7	6	19
Colorado	0	3	0	7	10
- Date: December 27, 2005
- Season: 2005
- Stadium: Florida Citrus Bowl
- Location: Orlando, Florida
- MVP: RB James Davis (Clemson)
- Referee: Marc Curles (Sun Belt)
- Attendance: 31,470

United States TV coverage
- Network: ESPN
- Announcers: Ron Franklin (play-by-play); Bob Davie (analysis)

The 2005 Champs Sports Bowl was the 16th edition to the college football bowl game and was played on December 27, 2005, featuring the Clemson Tigers and the Colorado Buffaloes. James Davis, the Clemson Running back was the Most Valuable Player of the game.

== Background ==
The Buffaloes were 7–2 at one point, losing only to #12 Miami and #2 Texas. The Colorado Buffaloes were champions of the Big 12 North Division, and they faced off against Texas in the Big 12 Championship game. They were soundly defeated in the Big 12 Championship game by eventual BCS Champion Texas 70–3. Texas would go on to win the BCS Championship in the 2006 Rose Bowl. Barnett had survived a recruiting scandal and a suspension following derogatory remarks about a female kicker, Katie Hnida, who claimed she was raped by a teammate in 2000. But the losses to Miami, Iowa State, Nebraska and the second Texas drubbing ultimately led to his forced resignation. Three weeks prior to the game, Colorado head coach Gary Barnett resigned and so the Buffalos were coached by defensive coordinator Mike Hankwitz against Clemson.

Meanwhile, Clemson began their season with a win over #17 Texas A&M at home, with a win over Maryland the following week. However, they lost their next three games (including one over #13 Miami) before a win over NC State righted the ship. They lost only once more to Georgia Tech for the rest of the year, closing out the year with wins over #17 Florida State and #19 South Carolina. They finished in 2nd place in the Atlantic Coast Conference Atlantic Division to Florida State and Boston College, the latter who Clemson had lost to during the skid.

This game was a rematch of the 1957 Orange Bowl.

== Game summary ==
Clemson scored first with a 26 yard field goal by Jad Dean, making it 3–0 Clemson in the opening moments. Colorado's Mason Crosby answered with a 36 yard field goal, tying it at 3. Clemson's Jad Dean kicked another field goal, an 18 yarder, giving Clemson a 6–3 lead. That score held up at half-time.

In the third quarter, quarterback Charlie Whitehurst scored on a 5 yard touchdown run, increasing the lead to 13–3. In the fourth quarter, Brian White threw a 2 yard touchdown pass to Quinn Sypniewski, cutting the margin to 13–10. James Davis added a 6 yard touchdown run to make the final margin 19–10, Clemson.

=== Scoring summary ===
	1	2	3	4	Total
Clemson	3	3	7	6	19
Colorado	0	3	0	7	10

Qtr.	Team	Scoring play	Drive	Score
1st – 5:23	CLEM	Dean 26 yard FG	10 plays, 77 yards, 3:16	CLEM 3–0
2nd – 14:56	COLO	Crosby 35 yard FG	6 plays, 11 yards, 2:48	TIED 3–3
2nd – 5:48	CLEM	Dean 18 yard FG	12 plays, 64 yards, 5:11	CLEM 6–3
3rd – 11:45	CLEM	Whitehurst 6 yard rush, Dean kick good	8 plays, 67 yards, 3:10	CLEM 13–3
4th – 5:45	COLO	Sypniewski 2 yard pass from White, Crosby kick good	6 plays, 69 yards, 3:21	CLEM 13–10
4th – 1:38	CLEM	Davis 11 yard rush, kick failed	7 plays, 61 yards, 4:02	CLEM 19–10

== Aftermath ==
Colorado made just one more bowl appearance in the decade, in 2007, which they also lost. They have not won a bowl game since 2004. Clemson went to four more bowl games in the decade.

== Bibliography ==
- University of Colorado Buffaloes football media guide (PDF copy available at http://www.cubuffs.com)
