= Mike Hankwitz =

American football player and coach (born 1947)

Biographical details
- Born: December 14, 1947 (age 78); Ludington, Michigan, U.S.

Playing career
- 1966–1969: Michigan
- Positions: Linebacker, tight end

Coaching career (HC unless noted)
- 1970: Michigan (JV)
- 1971–1972: Michigan (GA)
- 1973: Arizona (OLB)
- 1974–1975: Arizona (OLB/DB)
- 1976: Arizona (DC)
- 1977–1981: Purdue (OLB/P)
- 1982–1984: Western Michigan (DC/DB/P)
- 1985–1987: Colorado (OLB/P)
- 1988: Colorado (DC/ILB/P)
- 1989: Colorado (DC/P)
- 1990: Colorado (DC/DB/P)
- 1991: Colorado (DC/P)
- 1992–1994: Colorado (DC/OLB/P)
- 1995–1996: Kansas (DC/ILB)
- 1997–2002: Texas A&M (DC/LB/P)
- 2003: Arizona (DC)
- 2003: Arizona (Interim HC)
- 2004–2005: Colorado (DC)
- 2005: Colorado (Interim HC)
- 2006–2007: Wisconsin (DC)
- 2008–2020: Northwestern (DC)

Head coaching record
- Overall: 1–7
- Bowls: 0–1

Accomplishments and honors

Championships
- National champion (1990); 2x Big Ten West Division (2018, 2020); 1 WAC (1973); 1 Big Ten (1969)

George Michael Hankwitz (born December 14, 1947) is an American former football coach and player. He was the defensive coordinator at Northwestern University, a position he had held from 2008 to 2020. Hankwitz has twice served as an interim head football coach, for seven games in 2003 at the University of Arizona and for one game in 2005, the Champs Sports Bowl, with the University of Colorado Boulder, compiling a career head coaching record of 1–7.

Hankwitz played college football at the University of Michigan from 1966 to 1969. He has spent most of his coaching career as an assistant at a number of schools. Teams for which Hankwitz has coached have had a winning record in 34 of his 40 years. Ten of those clubs won conference championships and 12 more were league runners-up. Hankwitz has coached in 25 bowl games, including every major New Year's Day bowl game—Rose Bowl, Sugar Bowl, Fiesta Bowl, Orange Bowl, Cotton Bowl Classic, Outback Bowl and Capital One Bowl.

In his 25 years as a defensive coordinator, his defense has ranked in the nation's top 25 on 14 occasions. As coordinator, his teams have 36 wins over ranked programs, including nine wins over top-five clubs and two wins over #1-ranked teams. Hankwitz also has coached 14 first-team All-Americans, including four straight punters at Colorado, five conference defensive players of the year, 47 first-team all-conference choices and 12 team MVPs. He has recruited eight players who went on to play in the NFL. As a coordinator, Hankwitz has won 400 games and 11 conference championships.

== Playing career ==
Hankwitz was a three-year football letterwinner for the Wolverines and started on the 1969 Big Ten championship squad that played in the Rose Bowl. Hankwitz earned a B.S. in education from Michigan in 1970.

Although born in Ludington, Mike grew up in Scottville, MI where he was an all-conference quarterback. At the University of Michigan, he became their primary fieldgoal kicker.

== Coaching career ==
Including his work as a graduate assistant at Michigan and his stints as an interim head coach, Hankwitz has made 11 different coaching stops. Hankwitz is considered an X's and O's guru, having built top-five defenses at multiple stops. He has served as an assistant under a number of accomplished head coaches, including Bo Schembechler at Michigan, Jim Young at Arizona and Purdue, Bill McCartney at Colorado, Glen Mason at Kansas, R. C. Slocum at Texas A&M, John Mackovic at Arizona, and Gary Barnett at Colorado.

=== Michigan, first stint at Arizona, Purdue, Western Michigan ===
Hankwitz began his coaching career as a graduate assistant from 1970 to 1972 at his alma mater, the University of Michigan, under head coach Bo Schembechler. There he helped the Wolverines to two Big Ten Conference titles, a 30–3 record, three top-ten national rankings and an appearance in the 1972 Rose Bowl. Hankwitz was the outside linebackers, secondary, and punt return/punt rush coach at the University of Arizona from 1973 to 1976. He then moved to Purdue University as the outside linebackers and punting coach from 1977 to 1981. Next Hankwitz was the defensive coordinator with additional responsibilities for the secondary, punters, and punt team at Western Michigan University from 1982 to 1984. The 1982 Western Michigan defense allowed only 72 points, the fewest in Division I that season.

=== First stint at Colorado ===
Hankwitz enjoyed a successful 10-year run in his first stint at the University of Colorado at Boulder (1985–1994). After coaching outside linebackers and punters his first three years with the Buffaloes, he was named the program's defensive coordinator in 1988. Colorado put together the nation's fifth-best record (58–11–4) from 1989 to 1994, won a share of the national title in 1990, captured three Big Eight Conference titles, made two appearances each in the Orange and Fiesta Bowl, and finished top-20 all six years including three top-five finishes. The Buffs' 1989 and 1991 teams set the school record for fewest points allowed (150) in a season. Among Hankwitz's standout players at Colorado were Jim Thorpe Award winners Deon Figures (1992) and Chris Hudson (1994), and Butkus Award winner Alfred Williams (1990).

=== Kansas, Texas A&M ===
Hankwitz spent two seasons (1995–1996) as defensive coordinator and inside linebackers coach for head coach Glen Mason at the University of Kansas. The 1995 Jayhawks recorded the school's first 10-win season since 1905, played in the Aloha Bowl and ranked 10th in the final national polls.

Hankwitz was the defensive coordinator, linebackers coach, and punting coach at Texas A&M University from 1997 to 2002, where he guided the Aggies' famed "Wrecking Crew" defense. During that span he had three top-10 ranked defenses and two more top-20 defenses as Texas A&M won the Big 12 Conference championship in 1998 and also captured Big 12 South Division title the year before. Among Hankwitz's standout players at Texas A&M was Dat Nguyen, who won the Lombardi and Bednarik Awards.

=== Returns to Arizona and Colorado, interim head coaching stints ===
After his stint at Texas A&M, Hankwitz returned to Arizona and served as defensive coordinator in 2003. After head coach John Mackovic was fired four games into the season, Hankwitz was named interim head coach for the rest of the season and compiled a record of 1–6.

The next season, Hankwitz returned to Colorado where he spent two seasons as defensive coordinator and outside linebackers coach there. He served as the program's interim head coach for the Buffaloes in the 2005 Champs Sports Bowl against Clemson after Gary Barnett was forced to resign, though Colorado credits the game to Barnett. Colorado won the Big 12 North Division title in both 2004 and 2005.

=== Wisconsin ===
Hankwitz next moved on to the University of Wisconsin, where he served as the Badgers' defensive coordinator. In 2006, Wisconsin touted one of the nation's best defenses, ranking first in the nation in pass efficiency defense (84.19 rating, third-lowest in Big Ten Conference history), second in scoring defense (12.1 point per game), and fifth in total defense (253.1 yard per game). The Badgers limited six of their opponents to ten or fewer points and allowed only three foes to reach the 20-point mark. In two years with the Badgers, Hankwitz coached 13 players who received at least honorable mention All-Big Ten honors. Eight of the 11 defensive starters from the 2006 squad received at least honorable mention All-Big Ten recognition, including first-team cornerback Jack Ikegwuonu and second-teamers Matt Shaughnessy and Roderick Rogers.

=== Northwestern ===
Hired on January 18, 2008, Hankwitz was Northwestern's defensive coordinator while assisting with the safeties. He made an impact in first season in 2008, coach the Wildcats defense to fifth-best improvement in the nation from the previous season. After allowing 31.0 points per game in 2007, Northwestern surrendered just 20.2 in 2008 to rank 27th in the country and fourth in the Big Ten. The Wildcats also ranked in the top-30 nationally in sacks (18th), pass efficiency defense (25th) and tackles for loss (28th). The defense was the best the Wildcat program had seen since their head coach, Pat Fitzgerald, led the unit on the field in 1995 and 1996 as an All-American linebacker. The Wildcats posted 20 defensive shutout quarters on the year and held four opponents to under 100 yards rushing—including a school record four-yard performance against Ohio. In the Alamo Bowl, Northwestern's defense held Missouri, which touted one of the nation's most potent offenses, averaging 497.5 yards of offense and 43.2 point per game), to just 286 yards and 17 points through four quarters of play. The Wildcats fell to the Tigers in overtime, 30–23. The Wildcats beat Auburn in the 2021 Citrus Bowl to earn Hankwitz’s 400th win.

Hankwitz retired from coaching at the end of the 2020 season. He retired with 400 wins over his 51 year career and coached 580 games in his career, both records.

== Family ==
Hankwitz and his wife, Cathy, have a son, Jacob.

== Head coaching record ==
Year	Team	Overall	Conference	Standing	Bowl/playoffs
Arizona Wildcats (Pacific-10 Conference) (2003)
2003	Arizona	1–6 (Note: Hankwitz served as interim head coach after the firing of John Mackovic five games into the season.)	1–6	10th	
Arizona:		1–6	1–6		
Colorado Buffaloes (Big 12 Conference) (2005)
2005	Colorado	0–1 (Note: Hankwitz served as interim head coach at the 2005 Champs Sports Bowl after Gary Barnett resigned. The NCAA and the College Football Data Warehouse credit the bowl loss to Hankwitz, while Colorado credits the entire season to Barnett.)	0–0		L Champs Sports
Colorado:		0–1	0–0		
Total:		1–7			
