= Oklahoma State University Cowboy Marching Band =

College marching band in Stillwater, Oklahoma

Cowboy Marching Band
- School: Oklahoma State University
- Location: Stillwater, Oklahoma
- Conference: Big 12
- Founded: 1905
- Director: Allan Goodwin
- Members: about 300
- Fight song: "The Waving Song, Ride 'Em Cowboys, OSU Chant"

The Cowboy Marching Band is the marching band of Oklahoma State University.

== History ==
The first band at Oklahoma A&M College (now Oklahoma State University) was organized in 1905 by Harry Dunn, a student at the school, and directed by a Mr. Wood. It consisted of 22 members.

A tradition of the band was the use of the OSU Spirit Drum. It was purchased in the mid-1930s for the R.O.T.C. band. It was believed to be the largest drum in the country at that time.

== Directors since 1981 ==
- Richard Kastendieck (1981–1986)
- Gregory Talford (1986–1987)
- William Ballenger (1987–1992)
- Glen J. Hemberger (1992–1997)
- Michael A. Raiber (1997–2000)
- David Wick (2000–2001)
- Bradley J. Genevro (2001–2004)
- Paul W. Popiel (2004–2006)
- D. Bradley Snow (2006–2010)
- Doug Henderson (2010–2020)
- Tyler Austin (2020–2022)
- Phil Vallejo (2022–2023)
- Bradley J. Genevro (2023–2024)
- Allan Goodwin (2024–present)
