= Viviano Minardi =

Italian footballer

Personal information
- Date of birth: 15 June 1998 (age 28)
- Place of birth: Cosenza, Italy
- Height: 1.79 m (5 ft 10 in)
- Position: Midfielder

Youth career
- –2017: Genoa
- 2015–2016: → Cosenza (loan)

Senior career*
Years	Team	Apps	(Gls)
2015–2018	Genoa	0	(0)
2015–2016	→ Cosenza (loan)	1	(0)
2017–2018	→ Pistoiese (loan)	21	(1)
2018–2020	Pistoiese	13	(3)
2020–2021	Prato	34	(6)
2021–2022	Pistoiese	10	(0)
- * Club domestic league appearances and goals as of 23 April 2022

Viviano Minardi (born 15 June 1998) is an Italian footballer who plays as a midfielder.

== Club career ==
He made his Serie C debut for Cosenza on 7 October 2015 in a game against Catania.

On 25 September 2020 he joined Serie D club Prato.

On 16 August 2021, he returned to Pistoiese on a one-year deal.
