= Terry Allen (American football coach) =

American football player and coach (born 1957)

Biographical details
- Born: June 27, 1957 (age 69)

Playing career
- 1975–1978: Northern Iowa
- Position: Quarterback

Coaching career (HC unless noted)
- 1979: Northern Iowa (GA)
- 1980–1988: Northern Iowa (assistant)
- 1989–1996: Northern Iowa
- 1997–2001: Kansas
- 2002–2005: Iowa State (Assoc. HC/TE/ST)
- 2006–2014: Missouri State

Head coaching record
- Overall: 133–125
- Tournaments: 6–7 (NCAA D-I-AA playoffs)

Accomplishments and honors

Championships
- 7 Gateway (1990–1996)

Terry Allen (born June 27, 1957) is an American former college football player and coach. He last coached at Missouri State. He was the head coach at the University of Kansas from 1997 to 2001, where he compiled a 20–33 record. He also served as the head coach of the University of Northern Iowa, where his 75–26 record made him the winningest coach in Gateway Conference history. His teams won or shared the Gateway title from 1990 through 1996, during which time he was named the Gateway Coach of the Year five of those seasons. Allen coached future NFL players Kurt Warner, Bryce Paup, James Jones, Kenny Shedd, and Dedric Ward while at the University of Northern Iowa. While head coach of the University of Kansas, Allen was accused of sheltering football players who had been accused of sexual assault. Allen retired from coaching following the last game of the 2014 football season, stating he was "done being a head coach."

== Head coaching record ==
Year	Team	Overall	Conference	Standing	Bowl/playoffs
Northern Iowa Panthers (Gateway Football Conference) (1989–1996)
1989	Northern Iowa	8–3	4–2	T–2nd	
1990	Northern Iowa	8–4	5–1	T–1st	L NCAA Division I-AA First Round
1991	Northern Iowa	11–2	5–1	1st	L NCAA Division I-AA Quarterfinal
1992	Northern Iowa	12–2	5–1	1st	L NCAA Division I-AA Semifinal
1993	Northern Iowa	8–4	5–1	1st	L NCAA Division I-AA First Round
1994	Northern Iowa	8–4	6–0	1st	L NCAA Division I-AA First Round
1995	Northern Iowa	8–5	5–1	T–1st	L NCAA Division I-AA Quarterfinal
1996	Northern Iowa	12–2	5–0	1st	L NCAA Division I-AA Semifinal
Northern Iowa:		75–26	40–7		
Kansas Jayhawks (Big 12 Conference) (1997–2001)
1997	Kansas	5–6	3–5	T–4th (North)	
1998	Kansas	4–7	1–7	T–5th (North)	
1999	Kansas	5–7	3–5	4th (North)	
2000	Kansas	4–7	2–6	T–5th (North)	
2001	Kansas	3–8	1–7	6th (North)	
Kansas:		21–35	10–30		
Missouri State Bears (Gateway Football/Missouri Valley Football Conference) (2006–2014)
2006	Missouri State	2–9	1–6	T–7th	
2007	Missouri State	6–5	2–4	T–5th	
2008	Missouri State	4–7	3–5	T–6th	
2009	Missouri State	6–5	4–4	T–5th	
2010	Missouri State	5–6	4–4	T–3rd	
2011	Missouri State	2–9	2–6	T–7th	
2012	Missouri State	3–8	3–5	8th	
2013	Missouri State	5–7	5–3	T–2nd	
2014	Missouri State	4–8	1–7	9th	
Missouri State:		37–64	25–44		
Total:		133–125			
National championship Conference title Conference division title or championship game berth
