= 2002 Fiesta Bowl =

2002 Tostitos Fiesta Bowl
- BCS Bowl Game; 31st Fiesta Bowl
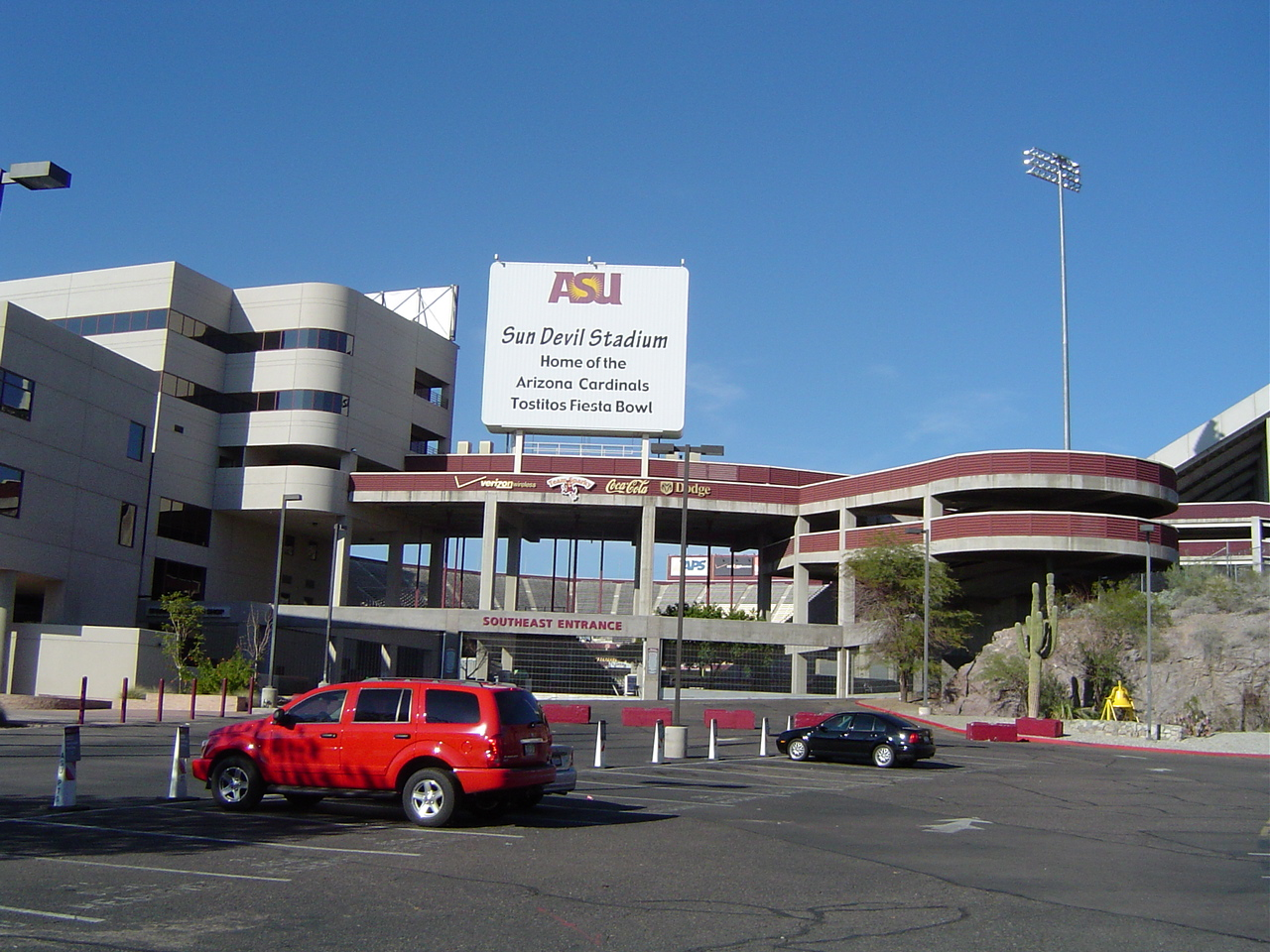
- Sun Devil Stadium in Tempe, Arizona, hosted the Fiesta Bowl.
Colorado Buffaloes	Oregon Ducks
(10–2)	(10–1)
Big 12	Pac-10
16	38
Head coach: Gary Barnett	Head coach: Mike Bellotti
AP / Coaches / BCS; 3 / 3 / 3	AP / Coaches / BCS; 2 / 2 / 4
	1	2	3	4	Total
Colorado	7	0	0	9	16
Oregon	7	14	7	10	38
- Date: January 1, 2002
- Season: 2001
- Stadium: Sun Devil Stadium
- Location: Tempe, Arizona
- MVP: Joey Harrington, QB; Steve Smith, CB
- National anthem: Boston
- Referee: Al Ford (SEC)
- Attendance: 74,118

United States TV coverage
- Network: ABC
- Announcers: Brent Musburger, Gary Danielson
- Nielsen ratings: 11.3

The 2002 Tostitos Fiesta Bowl, played on January 1, 2002, was the 31st edition of the Fiesta Bowl. The game was played at Sun Devil Stadium in Tempe, Arizona between the Colorado Buffaloes (ranked #3 in the BCS) and the Oregon Ducks (ranked #4 in the BCS). Oregon was ranked #2 in both the AP Poll and Coaches Poll, leading to some controversy that Oregon should have played for the 2002 BCS National Championship.

In the game, Oregon quarterback Joey Harrington threw for 350 yards and 4 touchdowns and led the Ducks to a 38–16 victory. Harrington was named offensive player of the game. Oregon cornerback Steve Smith had three interceptions, a Fiesta Bowl record, and was named defensive player of the game.

This was the first edition of the Fiesta Bowl to match two schools from the Western United States. Previous editions had either only one representative from the West, or none.

Colorado and Oregon became temporary conference rivals for 13 seasons when the Buffaloes joined Oregon's conference, the Pac-12 Conference (formerly the Pacific-10 Conference), in 2011.
