= Rod Babers =

American gridiron football player (born 1980)

No. 26
- Position: Cornerback

Personal information
- Born: October 6, 1980 (age 46); Houston, Texas, U.S.
- Listed height: 5 ft 9 in (1.75 m)
- Listed weight: 190 lb (86 kg)

Career information
- High school: Lamar (Houston)
- College: Texas (1999–2002)
- NFL draft: 2003: 4th round, 123rd overall pick

Career history
- New York Giants (2003)*; Detroit Lions (2003–2004); Tampa Bay Buccaneers (2005)*; Denver Broncos (2005)*; Chicago Bears (2005)*; Austin Wranglers (2006)*; Hamilton Tiger-Cats (2006)*
- * Offseason or practice squad member only

Awards and highlights
- Third-team All-American (2002); First-team All-Big 12 (2002)

Career NFL statistics
- Tackles: 10
- Stats at Pro Football Reference

Roderick Henri Babers (born October 6, 1980) is an American former professional football player who was a cornerback in the National Football League (NFL). He was selected by the New York Giants in the fourth round of the 2003 NFL draft. He played college football at Texas.

Babers was also a member of the Detroit Lions, Tampa Bay Buccaneers, Denver Broncos, Chicago Bears, Austin Wranglers and Hamilton Tiger-Cats.

== Early life and college ==
Babers attended Lamar High School in Houston, Texas.

He played college football at Texas from 1999 to 2002. He earned Associated Press (AP) first-team All-Big 12 honors his senior year in 2002. He was also named a third-team All-American by the AP and The Sporting News that same year.

== Professional career ==
Babers was selected by the New York Giants in the fourth round, with the 123rd overall pick, of the 2003 NFL draft. He officially signed with the team on July 24, 2003. He was placed on the exempt list on August 31, 2003 after he did not report to Giants Stadium the day before and the Giants were not able to contact him. A few days later, it was discovered that Babers had returned home to Houston. He was waived by the Giants on September 6, 2003.

Babers signed with the Detroit Lions on September 8, 2003. He played in five games for the Lions during the 2003 season, recording eight solo tackles and one assisted tackle. He was placed on injured reserve on November 11, 2003. Babers was waived on September 5, 2004 and signed to the team's practice squad on September 7, 2004. He was promoted to the active roster on September 18 and appeared in two games for the Lions in 2004, totaling one assisted tackle. He was placed on injured reserve on September 28, 2004.

Babers was signed by the Tampa Bay Buccaneers on April 4, 2005. He was waived on April 25, 2005.

He signed with the Denver Broncos on August 16, 2005. He was waived by the Broncos on August 30, 2005.

Babers was signed to the practice squad of the Chicago Bears on September 5, 2005. He was released on September 27, 2005.

He signed with the Austin Wranglers of the Arena Football League on December 5, 2005. He was waived on January 21, 2006.

Babers later signed with the Hamilton Tiger-Cats of the Canadian Football League but was released on June 10, 2006.

== Post-playing career ==
Babers has spent time working as a sports radio talk show host. He has hosted "Ball Don't Lie" and the "Longhorn Blitz". He was also a sideline reporter for IMG-produced Texas football radio broadcasts from 2011 to 2013.
