= John Minardi =

American football player (born 1979)

John Minardi (born October 19, 1979 in San Jose, California) is a former American football player. He played high school football at Santa Margarita Catholic High School in Orange County, California, from 1995 to 1997. In 1996, he caught 42 passes for 1,040 yards and 14 touchdowns; he also led the team with 117 tackles, the fourth best in school history. He holds the school's records for most receiving yards in a game (242), a season (1,469), and a career (2,546), and for the most receiving touchdowns in a game (3), season (19), and career (33). In high school, he played with quarterback Carson Palmer, and the two were called "the California high school equivalent of the San Francisco 49ers' Joe Montana and Jerry Rice." He played college football for the Colorado Buffaloes from 1998 to 2001. He was signed by the Houston Texans as an undrafted free agent in April 2002 but released in August 2002. On August 16, 2002, the Houston Chronicle reported that Minardi was "battling long odds to make the roster," but noted that "all eyes were on him Thursday when he made a great catch of a pass from David Carr and dragged both feet inbounds in the back of the end zone for a touchdown." However, he was waived by the Texans in the first week of September 2002. In January 2003, the Texans allocated Minardi to the NFL Europe. He played for the Scottish Claymores in the 2003 NFL Europe seasons.
