= Gary Barnett =

American football player and coach (born 1946)

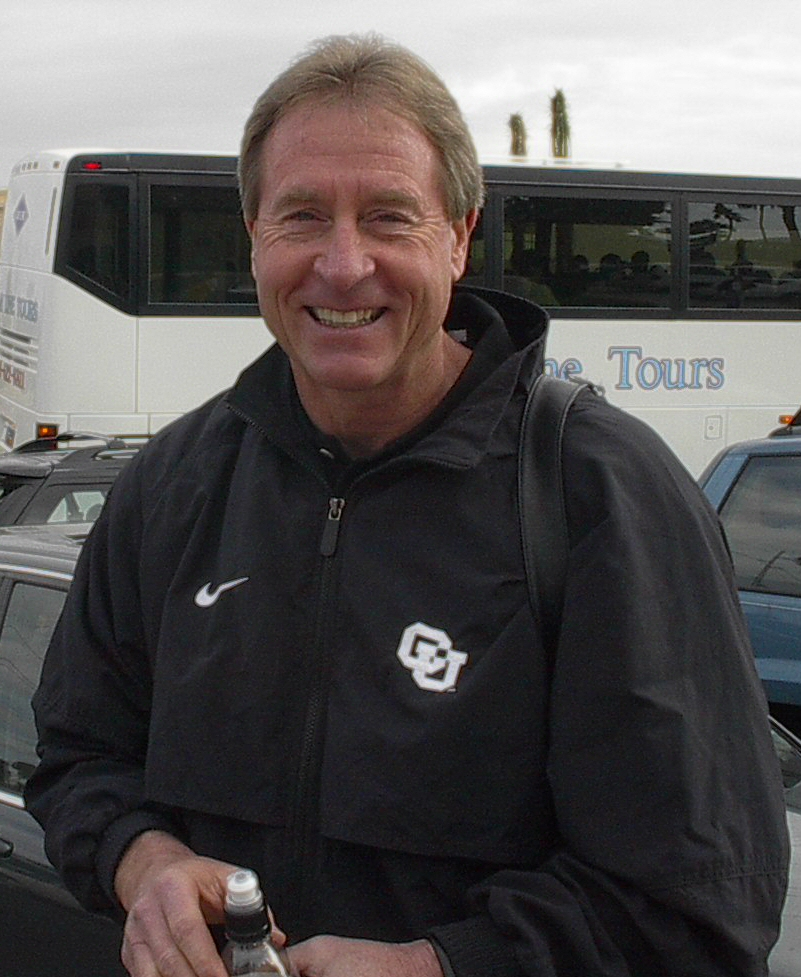
- Barnett before going to the 2002 Fiesta Bowl

Biographical details
- Born: May 23, 1946 (age 80); Lakeland, Florida, U.S.

Playing career
- 1966–1969: Missouri
- Position: Wide receiver

Coaching career (HC unless noted)
- 1969–1971: Missouri (GA)
- 1972–1981: Air Academy HS (CO)
- 1982–1983: Fort Lewis
- 1984–1991: Colorado (RB)
- 1985–1990: Colorado (QB/FB)
- 1991: Colorado (OC/QB/FB)
- 1992–1998: Northwestern
- 1999–2005: Colorado

Head coaching record
- Overall: 92–94–2 (college)
- Bowls: 2–4

Accomplishments and honors

Championships
- AP national champion (1990); 2 Big Ten (1995–1996); 1 Big 12 (2001); 4 Big 12 North Division (2001–2002, 2004–2005)

Awards
- AFCA Coach of the Year (1995); Bobby Dodd Coach of the Year Award (1995); Eddie Robinson Coach of the Year (1995); George Munger Award (1995); Home Depot Coach of the Year Award (1995); Paul "Bear" Bryant Award (1995); Sporting News College Football COY (1995); Walter Camp Coach of the Year Award (1995); Best Coach/Manager ESPY Award (1996); 2× Big Ten Coach of the Year (1995–1996); 2× Big 12 Conference Coach of the Year (AP) (2001, 2004)

Gary Lee Barnett (born May 23, 1946) is an American former football player and coach. He served as the head coach at Fort Lewis College (1982–1983), Northwestern University (1992–1998), and the University of Colorado at Boulder (1999–2005), compiling a career college football record of 92–94–2. His 1995 Northwestern team won the Big Ten Conference title, the first for the program since 1936, and played in the school's first Rose Bowl since 1949. At Colorado, Barnett was suspended briefly in the 2004 offseason due to events stemming from allegations of sexual misconduct by several members of the football team.

== Early life and playing career ==
Barnett attended Parkway Central High School in Chesterfield, Missouri, and graduated from the University of Missouri in 1969 with a bachelor's degree in social studies. He continued on to get his master's degree in 1971 in education. Barnett played wide receiver for Missouri from 1966 to 1969. He lettered his senior year under coach Dan Devine.

== Coaching career ==
=== Early coaching career ===
Barnett started his coaching career at the University of Missouri as a graduate assistant from 1969 to 1971 under coach Al Onofrio. After he graduated, he was a successful high school coach at Air Academy High School in Colorado Springs, Colorado for 11 years, nine as head coach. His teams won six conference titles and reached the state semi-finals twice, in 1980 and 1981. Barnett first became a head coach at Fort Lewis College in Durango, Colorado. After two seasons, he left on February 20, 1984 to become an assistant coach at Colorado under Bill McCartney. Barnett was the running backs coach for his first season, and he switched to quarterbacks and fullbacks for the next seven seasons. On December 3, 1990, he was promoted to offensive coordinator. His first game as coordinator was against Notre Dame in the 1991 Orange Bowl, which Colorado won to earn their first, and only, national championship.

=== Northwestern ===
Later in 1991, he left Colorado to become the head coach at Northwestern, then a perennial doormat team. When he was introduced to the student body he told them that he was going to "take the purple to Pasadena." He made good on that boast in 1995, when he led Northwestern to one of the best seasons in school history. The Wildcats won their first Big Ten Conference title since 1936 and played in the 1996 Rose Bowl, their first appearance of any kind since 1949. The Wildcats lost 41–32 to USC. The following year, the Wildcats won a share of the Big Ten title and reached the Florida Citrus Bowl, losing 48–28 to Tennessee. Barnett turned a program holding the record for the longest losing streak in Division I-A into a championship caliber organization. Northwestern, however, won only three Big Ten games in his final two seasons as head coach of the Wildcats, including a winless mark in his final year. In 2015, Barnett was selected for membership of the Northwestern University Athletic Hall of Fame. On September 26, 2015, Barnett was recognized with other recent Hall of Fame inductees during the half-time program at the Northwestern football team's home game against Ball State University.

After the success of Northwestern's football teams, Barnett became a sought-after commodity. In a 2017 article by the Chicago Tribune, it was noted that Barnett turned down head coaching jobs with Georgia and UCLA following the 1995 season. He also interviewed for the Notre Dame head coaching job following the retirement of Lou Holtz in 1996, however Barnett himself withdrew from consideration. In 1997, Barnett and Northwestern agreed to a 12-year contract worth $500,000 per year. Barnett also received consideration for the Texas head coaching job following the 1997 season.

=== Colorado ===
In 1999, Barnett left Northwestern after eight seasons and returned to Colorado as the school's 22nd head coach. His on-field career at Colorado was mostly successful. The Buffaloes won the 2001 conference title, and also won four Big 12 North titles during Barnett's seven-year tenure. Colorado was also ranked #2 in the nation and part of a controversy with the BCS Poll in the 2001 season when the Nebraska Cornhuskers were selected ahead of Oregon and Colorado for the National Championship game, even though Colorado had just beaten Nebraska 62–36 in the regular season finale (CU went on to defeat Texas in the Big 12 Championship game prior to the selection).

During the 2004 season, his reputation took a hit due to a recruiting scandal, insensitive off-field remarks, and failure to maintain the on-field success of his predecessors. Barnett was alleged to have enticed recruits to come to Colorado with sex and alcohol during recruiting visits. That scandal, coupled with Barnett's dismissive comments about former placekicker Katie Hnida, who alleged that she had been raped by a teammate, led to Barnett being publicly chastised by the president of the university at the time, Elizabeth Hoffman. Coach Barnett had told a local reporter who asked why Katie Hnida had been cut from the team that "Katie was not only a girl, she was terrible." Ultimately, the allegations and comments about Katie Hnida's kicking abilities led to Barnett's temporary suspension in 2004, during the off-season. Barnett was reinstated before the start of the 2004 season, and went on to coach the team to an 8–5 record, earning Big 12 Coach Of The Year honors along the way.

Barnett continued as coach in 2005, leading the Buffaloes to a 7–2 start. However, the Buffs lost to Iowa State, then suffered a 30–3 thrashing at the hands of Nebraska and a 70–3 blowout by the eventual national champion Texas Longhorns in the Big 12 championship game. Additionally, an anonymous tipster wrote a letter to CU system president Hank Brown accusing Barnett of numerous improprieties, including tampering with sworn testimony.

On December 9, 2005, Barnett was forced to resign and accepted a $3 million buyout. Colorado then went on to play in the Champs Sports Bowl, losing to Clemson. The loss is officially credited to Barnett, even though assistant Mike Hankwitz served as interim head coach for the game.

In June 2007, the Buffaloes were placed under probation for two years and fined US$100,000 for undercharging 133 student-athletes for meals over a six-year span (2000–01 to 2005–06 encompassing Barnett's tenure at Colorado) resulting in the major infraction. The football program, with 86 of the 133 student-athletes involved, also lost one scholarship for the next three seasons.

== After coaching ==
Barnett operates the Gary Barnett Foundation, which was formed in February 2005. The foundation is a tax-exempt, non-profit organization that is dedicated to the support of educational programs for economically disadvantaged and at-risk youth. Barnett began working as a TV commentator for the BCS show on Fox Sports Net in 2006. Barnett also is a commentator for Sports USA. In September 2016, Barnett joined Denver AM radio station 850 KOA, as color commentator for Colorado Buffaloes Football Games, alongside play-by-play man, Mark Johnson.

== Head coaching record ==
=== College ===
Year	Team	Overall	Conference	Standing	Bowl/playoffs	Coaches^{#}	AP^{°}
Fort Lewis Raiders (Rocky Mountain Athletic Conference) (1982–1983)
1982	Fort Lewis	4–5–1	3–4–1	5th			
1983	Fort Lewis	4–6	4–4	T–4th			
Fort Lewis:		8–11–1	7–8–1				
Northwestern Wildcats (Big Ten Conference) (1992–1998)
1992	Northwestern	3–8	3–5	T–6th			
1993	Northwestern	2–9	0–8	T–10th			
1994	Northwestern	3–7–1	2–6	10th			
1995	Northwestern	10–2	8–0	1st	L Rose	7	8
1996	Northwestern	9–3	7–1	T–1st	L Florida Citrus	16	15
1997	Northwestern	5–7	3–5	8th			
1998	Northwestern	3–9	0–8	11th			
Northwestern:		35–45–1	23–33				
Colorado Buffaloes (Big 12 Conference) (1999–2005)
1999	Colorado	7–5	5–3	3rd (North)	W Insight.com		
2000	Colorado	3–8	3–5	4th (North)			
2001	Colorado	10–3	7–1	T–1st (North)	L Fiesta^{†}	9	9
2002	Colorado	9–5	7–1	1st (North)	L Alamo	21	20
2003	Colorado	5–7	3–5	T–4th (North)			
2004	Colorado	8–5	4–4	T–1st (North)	W Houston		
2005	Colorado	7–5 (Note: Mike Hankwitz served as interim head coach at the 2005 Champs Sports Bowl after Barnett resigned. The NCAA and the College Football Data Warehouse credit the bowl loss to Hankwitz, while Colorado credits the entire season to Barnett.)	5–3	1st (North)	Champs Sports		
Colorado:		49–38	34–22				
Total:		92–94–2					
National championship Conference title Conference division title or championship game berth
^{†}Indicates BCS bowl.; ^{#}Rankings from final Coaches Poll.; ^{°}Rankings from final AP Poll.
