= Thomas A. Simone Award =

High school football award in Kansas City, U.S.

- Awarded for: Kansas City Metropolitan Area's Most Outstanding High School Football Player
- Location: Kansas City Metropolitan Area
- Country: United States
- Presented by: Greater Kansas City Football Coaches Association, coaches, media
- First award: 1983
- Currently held by: Rocco Marriott
- Website: thesimoneawards.com/awards/thomas-simone

The Thomas A. Simone Memorial Football Award is presented yearly to the most outstanding high school football player in the Kansas City Metropolitan Area. The award was created in 1931 by Dr. D. M. Nigro and continued until Dr. Nigro's death in 1976. The award was reinstated by Mr. and Mrs. Anthony Simone as a tribute to their 12-year-old son Tommy. The award is selected by a vote of the Greater Kansas City Football Coaches Association (GKCFCA), head coaches in the metro area and selected media members.

It is one of the Simone Awards presented annually to players, coaches and broadcasters for their outstanding contributions to high school football in the Kansas City area

The Greater Kansas City Football Coaches Association, as well as select area media members, are responsible for the administration of the Thomas A. Simone Award and the other awards presented annually as part of the Simone Awards.

== Winners ==
Year	Winner	School
1983	Jeff Kelso	Park Hill
1984	Shawn Long	Grandview
1985	Craig Phillips	Lee's Summit
1986	Tim Ryan	Rockhurst
1987	Kenyon Rasheed	Rockhurst
1988	Derrick Hart	Schlagle
1989	Jeff Handy	Blue Springs
1990	Kevin McIntosh	Hickman Mills
1991	Andy Murray	Blue Valley
1992	Nate Minnis	Blue Springs
1993	Jason Thoren	Lawrence
1994	Eddie Brooks	Blue Springs South
1995	Arland Bruce	Olathe North
1996	Ladell Betts	Blue Springs
1997	Josh Brewer	Olathe North
1998	Sean Doyle	Rockhurst
1999	Brandon Shelby	Rockhurst
2000	Darren Sproles	Olathe North
2001	Maurice Mack	Olathe North
2002	Jim Bouknight	Olathe North
2003	Michael Keenan	Oak Park
2004	Chase Coffman	Raymore–Peculiar
2005	Josh Freeman	Grandview
2006	Zack Rampy	Blue Valley
2007	Nathan Scheelhaase	Rockhurst
2008	Blaine Dalton	Blue Springs South
2009	James Franklin	Olathe North
2010	Bubba Starling	Gardner Edgerton
2011	Evan Boehm	Lee's Summit West
2012	Dalvin Warmack	Blue Springs
2013	Dalvin Warmack	Blue Springs
2014	Drew Lock	Lee's Summit
2015	Skylar Thompson	Fort Osage
2016	Julian Ross	Staley
2017	Ronnie Bell	Park Hill
2018	Graham Mertz	Blue Valley North
2019	Arland Bruce IV	Olathe North
2020	Conrad Hawley	Raymore–Peculiar
2021	Mikey Pauley	Blue Valley Northwest
2022	Kendrick Bell	Park Hill
2023	Dylan Dunn	Blue Valley Southwest
2024	Jaxon Hicks	Liberty
2025	Rocco Marriott	Platte County

== See also ==
- Simone Awards
