= 2009 Kansas State Wildcats football team =

American college football season

2009 Kansas State Wildcats football
- Conference: Big 12 Conference
- North
- Record: 6–6 (4–4 Big 12)
- Head coach: Bill Snyder (18th season)
- Co-offensive coordinators: Dana Dimel (3rd season); Del Miller (10th season)
- Offensive scheme: Multiple
- Co-defensive coordinators: Chris Cosh (1st season); Vic Koenning (1st season)
- Base defense: 4–3
- Home stadium: Bill Snyder Family Football Stadium

Uniform

2009 Big 12 Conference football standings
	Conf.			Overall
Team	W		L	W		L
North Division
No. 14 Nebraska x	6	–	2	10	–	4
Missouri	4	–	4	8	–	5
Kansas State	4	–	4	6	–	6
Iowa State	3	–	5	7	–	6
Colorado	2	–	6	3	–	9
Kansas	1	–	7	5	–	7
South Division
No. 2 Texas x$	8	–	0	13	–	1
Oklahoma State	6	–	2	9	–	4
No. 21 Texas Tech	5	–	3	9	–	4
Oklahoma	5	–	3	8	–	5
Texas A&M	3	–	5	6	–	7
Baylor	1	–	7	4	–	8
Championship: Texas 13, Nebraska 12
$ – BCS representative as conference champion; x – Division champion/co-champions; Rankings from AP Poll

The 2009 Kansas State Wildcats football team (variously "Kansas State", "KSU", "K-State", or "Wildcats") represented Kansas State University in the 2009 NCAA Division I FBS football season. The Wildcats played their home games in Bill Snyder Family Football Stadium, in Manhattan, Kansas as they have done since 1968. It was the 114th season in school history.

The non-conference schedule kicked off with a home game against the UMass Minutemen, and culminated with the second trip in school history to Los Angeles, California to play UCLA in the Rose Bowl. (They played at USC in 2001). The Big 12 Conference schedule began with a trip to Arrowhead Stadium in Kansas City, Missouri to play the Iowa State Cyclones. It was K-State's third trip to Arrowhead Stadium to play a regular season game. They played the Iowa Hawkeyes in the Eddie Robinson Classic in 2000 and the California Golden Bears in the BCA Classic in 2003. Kansas State has also participated in two Big 12 Championship Games at Arrowhead Stadium, in 2000 and 2003. They finished the regular season on November 21 with a trip to Lincoln, Nebraska and faced the Nebraska Cornhuskers.

== Preseason ==
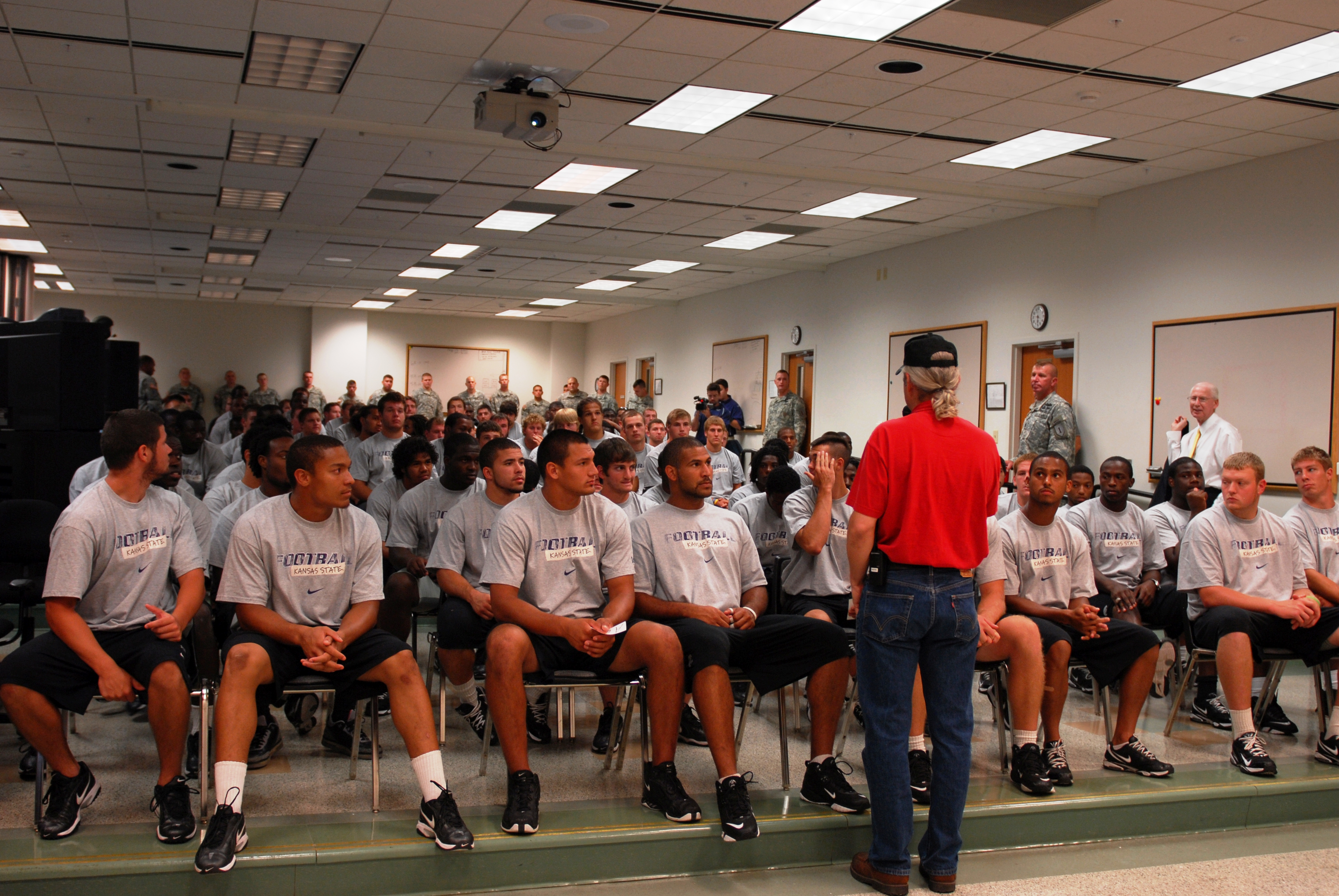
The team visited Fort Riley during the preseason.

Bill Snyder returned to the sidelines as head coach after three years of retirement. He replaced Ron Prince, who succeeded him in 2005. This was Snyder's 18th season as the Wildcats' head coach. He was rehired to the position on November 24, 2008, making him one of the few college football head coaches to have non-consecutive tenure at the same school. He compiled a 136–68–1 record from 1988 to 2005 in his previous stint, considered by most as the greatest turnaround in college football history. In 57 seasons prior to Snyder's arrival, Kansas State's football program had only been able to muster 137 wins, one more than Snyder won in just 17 seasons there.

Kansas State was picked by some publications to have a record of 8–4, or as low as 5–7, with a 2–6 record in conference play. Carson Coffman won the starting quarterback role during the preseason, but lost his job to Grant Gregory at the start of conference play. Deon Murphy left the team in the offseason for personal reasons. The Wildcats lost three-year starter, Josh Freeman who was drafted by the Tampa Bay Buccaneers with the 17th pick in the first round of the 2009 NFL draft.

== Schedule ==
Date	Time	Opponent	Site	TV	Result	Attendance	Source
September 5	6:10 p.m.	UMass*	Bill Snyder Family Football Stadium; Manhattan, KS		W 21–17	50,750	
September 12	6:00 p.m.	at Louisiana–Lafayette*	Cajun Field; Lafayette, LA	ESPN3	L 15–17	16,431	
September 19	9:15 p.m.	at UCLA*	Rose Bowl; Pasadena, CA	FSN	L 9–23	67,311	
September 26	1:10 p.m.	Tennessee Tech*	Bill Snyder Family Football Stadium; Manhattan, KS		W 49–7	48,094	
October 3	2:00 p.m.	vs. Iowa State	Arrowhead Stadium; Kansas City, MO (rivalry)	FCS	W 24–23	40,851	
October 10	6:00 p.m.	at Texas Tech	Jones AT&T Stadium; Lubbock, TX	FSN	L 14–66	47,382	
October 17	6:00 p.m.	Texas A&M	Bill Snyder Family Football Stadium; Manhattan, KS	FCS	W 62–14	44,934	
October 24	11:30 a.m.	Colorado^{†}	Bill Snyder Family Football Stadium; Manhattan, KS (rivalry)	FCS	W 20–6	42,019	
October 31	6:00 p.m.	at No. 22 Oklahoma	Gaylord Family Oklahoma Memorial Stadium; Norman, OK	FSN	L 30–42	84,021	
November 7	11:30 a.m.	Kansas	Bill Snyder Family Football Stadium; Manhattan, KS (rivalry)	Versus	W 17–10	48,306	
November 14	11:30 a.m.	Missouri	Bill Snyder Family Football Stadium; Manhattan, KS	Versus	L 12–38	46,476	
November 21	6:45 p.m.	at No. 25 Nebraska	Memorial Stadium; Lincoln, NE (rivalry)	ESPN	L 3–17	85,998	
*Non-conference game; ^{†}Homecoming; Rankings from AP Poll released prior to the game; All times are in Central time

== Game summaries ==
=== UMass ===
	1	2	3	4	Total
Massachusetts	3	0	7	7	17
Kansas State	0	21	0	0	21

The season opener against the UMass Minutemen marked the return of head coach Bill Snyder, and was dubbed as the Kansas State "Family Reunion". Over 300 former Kansas State players were in attendance, and 50,750 fans (the largest crowd to witness a season opener in Manhattan) watched the Wildcats beat UMass, 21–17. K-State quarterback Carson Coffman completed 14 out of 27 passes, totaling to 182 yards, including two passing touchdowns and a rushing score. This was the second all-time meeting between the Wildcats and Minutemen.

=== Louisiana–Lafayette ===
	1	2	3	4	Total
Kansas State	2	0	0	13	15
Louisiana Lafayette	0	14	0	3	17

This was the first ever trip for the Wildcats to Lafayette, Louisiana. K-State was favored by 7 points going into the game. Tyler Albrecht's first career field goal attempt was a memorable one as the junior nailed a 48-yarder with 32 seconds left to give Louisiana-Lafayette a 17–15 victory over Kansas State.

The Ragin' Cajuns, unbeaten through their first two games for the first time since 1990, trailed 15–14 before driving from their 33 to the Kansas State 30. Louisiana-Lafayette had only two first downs in the second half before quarterback Chris Masson completed four passes for 30 yards in the final drive. Kansas State (1–1) rallied from a 14–2 deficit with two fourth-quarter touchdowns.

Wildcat running back Daniel Thomas threw for one score and ran for one, throwing a 3-yard jump pass to Jeron Mastrud off a direct snap on the first play of the final quarter.

Seven minutes later, Thomas capped an 86-yard drive with a 3-yard run, and Josh Cherry hit the extra point for the 15–14 lead with 8:08 left. Thomas finished with 136 rushing yards, 92 in the second half. The Wildcats took a 2–0 lead when Masson ran out of his own end zone after a bad snap with 2:43 left in the opening quarter.

Masson, who finished 20-for-36 for 185 yards, came back to guide the Ragin' Cajuns on a 61-yard drive that was capped by Undrea Sails' 9-yard touchdown run with 9:37 left in the first half. Louisiana-Lafayette drove 73 yards in the final 2:19 of the half to take a 14–2 halftime lead on Masson's 1-yard pass to Luke Aubrey.

The Ragin' Cajuns had three first-half turnovers, but the Wildcats couldn't take advantage despite having five first-half possessions in Ragin' Cajun territory. Kansas State was 0-for-8 on third-down conversions in the first half.

=== UCLA ===
	1	2	3	4	Total
Kansas State	3	0	6	0	9
UCLA	7	6	0	10	23

UCLA had a 2–0 record at game time, winning over San Diego State 33–14 at home and beating Tennessee 19–15 on the road. UCLA was favored by 11½ points going into the game in the Rose Bowl. It was the first ever game between the two schools. Senior quarterback Kevin Craft took over from injured Kevin Prince for the Bruins.

Craft passed for 186 yards and a touchdown to lead the Bruins to a 23–9 victory over the Wildcats. Freshman Johnathan Franklin rushed for a career-best 119 yards on 23 carries and Kai Forbath kicked three field goals in the victory. Craft completed 13 of 24 passes with one interception including a game-clinching 51-yard scoring pass to Terrence Austin with 6:18 remaining.

Josh Cherry kicked a 26-yard field goal in the first quarter and Daniel Thomas had a 7-yard run in the third quarter for the Wildcats. Ryan Doerr's PAT pass failed. UCLA's one fumble loss and eight penalties for 80 yards were the ugly part of the victory. The Wildcats had two fumbles and four penalties for 50 yards. Alterra Verner had two interceptions and returned them for 47 yards for the Bruins.

=== Tennessee Tech ===
	1	2	3	4	Total
Tennessee Tech	7	0	0	0	7
Kansas State	14	7	21	7	49

Senior Brandon Banks became the 12th player in NCAA history, including the first Big 12 player, to return two kickoffs for touchdowns in the same game, as Kansas State rolled past Tennessee Tech, 49-7 Bill Snyder Family Stadium.

Banks, whose 303 all-purpose yards ranks fifth in school history, broke a 7-all tie with a 91-yard kick return with 2:28 remaining in the first quarter then jump-started the second half with a 92-yard return to give the Wildcats a 28–7 lead. Banks also had three receptions for 90 yards, including an electrifying 64-yard reception to set up a 2-yard score by junior running back Daniel Thomas in the second quarter. The last player to achieve the feat of two kickoff returns for touchdowns was UCLA's Brandon Breazell against Northwestern in the Sun Bowl on Dec. 30, 2005.

Banks' banner day overshadowed another fine outing by Thomas, who recorded his third 100-yard rushing game of the season with a career-high 139 yards to go with two touchdowns. Two other rushers - seniors Keithen Valentine (73 yards on 10 carries) and Grant Gregory (58 yards on nine carries) - tallied 50 or more yards to help the Wildcats post their highest rushing total since 2005.

Junior quarterback Carson Coffman was also solid on the day, completing 8-of-9 passes for 131 yards. He also capped K-State's second offensive scoring drive with a 5-yard score in the second quarter.

Backup signal caller Grant Gregory saw his most significant action of the season, playing most of the third and fourth quarters. Gregory was a perfect 2-of-2 passing for 21 yards to go with 58 yards rushing. He scored his first career touchdown as a Wildcat on a one-yard run with 10:50 left in the fourth quarter that capped the scoring.

The Kansas State offense finished with a season-high 49 points, which was four more than it had totaled in its three previous games of the season. The squad also collected season bests for total yards (448) and rushing yards (296). The 296 yards rushing were the most since the Wildcats had 305 yards against North Texas on Sept. 24, 2005.

The defense was again stellar on the afternoon, holding the Golden Eagles to just 107 yards of total offense including negative 19 yards rushing to go with three sacks. It was the fewest yards yielded an opponent since allowing 53 yards against Ball State on Sept. 16, 2000, while it was lowest rushing output by an foe since Baylor had minus 37 yards rushing on Oct. 26, 2002.

=== Iowa State ===
	1	2	3	4	Total
Kansas State	7	3	0	14	24
Iowa State	0	10	7	6	23

Iowa State was favored by 2 points going into the game. Kansas State sophomore defensive back Emmanuel Lamur blocked the tying extra-point with 32 seconds remaining to help Kansas State earn its first Big 12 win with a 24–23 victory over Iowa State at Arrowhead Stadium.

Senior quarterback Grant Gregory threw two fourth-quarter touchdowns in his first career start as a Wildcat, completing 16 of 23 passes for 206 yards to go with 29 yards rushing on 14 carries and one touchdown. The go-ahead score came with 5:36 remaining in the game in which Gregory rolled out to avoid the rush before hitting senior wideout Brandon Banks on a 54-yard strike.

Junior running back Daniel Thomas nearly collected his fourth 100-yard game of the season, posting 96 yards on 25 carries. He also had five catches for 38 yards, including a 13-yard catch. Banks, the reigning Big 12 Special Teams of the Week, totaled 164 of all-purpose yards, including four catches for 66 yards and a touchdown and three kickoffs for 67 yards.

The offenses were nearly identical with Iowa State (3–2, 0–1 Big 12) holding a narrow advantage on total yards, 371–360. The Wildcats (3–2, 1–0 Big 12) had 206 yards passing to go with 154 yards on the ground. Once again, K-State held the edge in time of possession (33:33 to 26:27) and converted eight of 16 third-down conversions.

Gregory got the scoring started with a 2-yard run to cap a 13-play, 89-yard drive on its opening possession that consumed seven minutes of the first quarter. Thomas got the ball on the first five possession and totaled 30 yards on seven rushes.

Iowa State responded with a 32-yard field goal from Grant Mahoney with 9:39 left in the second quarter then took a 10–7 lead on a 22-yard touchdown pass from Austen Arnaud to Derrick Catlett with 3:55 left in the quarter.

However, the Wildcats tied the score at 10-all with a 39-yard field goal from Josh Cherry just five seconds before the half. Gregory was stellar on the 10-play, 48-yard drive, completing four of seven passes for 39 yards. He hit senior Attrail Snipes for a 24-yard touchdown on a key third down play to put the Wildcats in Iowa State territory.

The third quarter belonged to the Cyclones, who went ahead 17–10 on a 3-yard run by Arnaud that capped a 12-play, 80-yard drive.

However, just minutes into the fourth quarter, sophomore David Garrett forced a fumble after a 12-yard catch by Derrick Catlett and Tysyn Hartman recovered on the Iowa State 36. Seven plays later, on third and goal from the 16, Gregory connected on a 16-yard pass to wideout Lamark Brown tie the game up at 17 apiece.

K-State then went ahead on the dramatic 54-yard catch by Banks with 5:36 remaining in the game.

After the Wildcat defense forced a third-and-out, K-State tried to run out the clock with a six-play drive that cut the time to 1:49. However, Arnaud converted a key 4-and-5 play with a 22-yard pass completion to Marqui Hamilton for a first down at the Kansas State 23. He then connected on a 23-yard strike to Jake Williams over two defenders to cut the deficit to 24–23. On the next play, Lamur blocked the Grant Mahoney's extra point to give the Wildcats the win.

The defense was led by the play of linebacker Alex Hrebec, who had a team-high eight tackles. Defensive back Joshua Moore had 5½ tackles and a break-up, while Jeffrey Fitzgerald totaled five tackles. Linebacker John Houlik posted 4½ tackles and one fumble recovery and defensive back Stephen Harrison had four stops and two pass break-ups.

=== Texas Tech ===
	1	2	3	4	Total
Kansas State	0	0	7	7	14
Texas Tech	14	24	14	14	66

Texas Tech was favored by 16½ points going into the game. Tech quarterback Steven Sheffield threw for 490 yards and seven touchdown passes in his first career start to help Texas Tech beat Kansas State 66–14.

The Red Raiders backup quarterback was 33-for-41 and finished with TDs passes of 52, 6, 4, 72, 28, 12 and 25 yards to five receivers. It was the second time this season that a Texas Tech (4–2, 1–1 Big 12) quarterback notched seven passing touchdowns. Taylor Potts, out with a concussion this week, threw seven in a 55–10 win over Rice.

Texas Tech put the game out of reach by halftime. The Wildcats (3–3, 1–1 Big 12) got into Texas Tech territory only once in the first half and punted five times. Sheffield, who had 370 yards by halftime, threw two TDs to Detron Lewis and Torres, and one each to Tramain Swindall, Jacoby Franks and Lyle Leong. Sheffield's first-half yardage set a school record, besting the 367 yards thrown by B.J. Symons against Mississippi in 2003.

Three Red Raiders receivers tallied 90 yards or more. Lewis caught eight passes for 100 yards, Franks had three passes for 99 yards and Swindall got 97 yards on five catches.

Sheffield threw to 11 receivers before leaving the game with about 10 minutes remaining in the game. Texas Tech's running game kept Kansas State off-balance. Baron Batch rushed for 86 yards on nine carries and Harrison Jeffers got 55 yards on seven carries.

The Wildcats offense was anemic in the first half. They sustained only one drive in the first half, managing four first downs and hanging onto the ball for more than six minutes on their opening possession. Grant Gregory got sacked three times-twice by Brandon Sharpe and once by Ra'Jon Henley-before Carson Coffman replaced him late in the second quarter.

Kansas State's first score came from its defense. Sheffield threw an interception on his first pass of the second half when Wildcats end Jeffrey Fitzgerald stepped in front of a ball meant for Alex Torres and returned it 17 yards to make it 38–7.

It wasn't until quarterback Carson Coffman replaced Gregory that the Wildcats showed some life. He was 11-for-17 and finished with 131 passing yards.

Coffman found some success in the third quarter but it didn't translate into a touchdown. After a 52-yard pass to Daniel Thomas and a 29-yarder to Jeron Mastrud, the Wildcats failed on a fourth-and-5 and gave the ball back to the Red Raiders.

Kansas State scored its second touchdown-and its only offensive one- midway through the fourth quarter when Keithen Valentine ran for an 8-yard touchdown to whittle the margin to 59–14.

Valentine rushed for a career-high 96 yards on eight carries

=== Texas A&M ===
	1	2	3	4	Total
Texas A&M	0	0	14	0	14
Kansas State	17	21	21	3	62

The Kansas State Wildcats made a statement in their 62–14 blistering of Texas A&M. Bill Snyder and his team put together a complete performance dominating the Aggies in all three phases - offense, defense and special teams. It was the most points K-State has scored in a Big 12 Conference game since defeating Kansas 64–0 on November 2, 2002.

Already ahead 38–0 at the half, K-State (4–3, 2–1 Big 12) got the ball first in the second half and immediately put points on the board. Return specialist Brandon Banks returned his school-record third kickoff of the year for a touchdown to pull ahead 45–0. Then, K-State intercepted a pass and returned it inside the 10-yard line and scored on the first play to put A&M further back, 52–0.

The Wildcats gained 424 yards of total offense on the day and saw a career day from running back Daniel Thomas, as he rushed for 91 yards and scored four touchdowns - all of them coming in the first half. His four TDs were one short of tying a school record.

Texas A&M (3–3, 0–2 Big 12) could not get anything going on offense as the Wildcats swarmed to the ball on defense and forced a season-high five turnovers on the night. The Aggies gained 301 total yards, and quarterback Jerrod Johnson threw his first three interceptions of the season.

K-State's defense helped the Wildcats get on the board early in the game forcing a turnover on Texas A&M's second play from scrimmage. Jeffrey Fitzgerald stripped the ball out of Jamie McCoy's arms as the fumble was recovered by Troy Butler. The Wildcats would make quick work of the short field and score in four plays to cover the 29 yards to go ahead 7–0 on a Daniel Thomas touchdown run. It marked the third time this season the Wildcats have scored on their opening possession.

The Wildcat defense came up with another stop after allowing the Aggies to gain one first down on their second possession. A penalty on the punt return by Texas A&M and a pass interference call helped K-State push the ball downfield before a 23-yard field goal by Josh Cherry gave the Wildcats a 10-point advantage.

K-State's defense continued to pour it on against the Aggies forcing a three-and-out following the field goal. After an incomplete pass, Fitzgerald tallied a tackle for loss on a rushing attempt by the Aggies. Then, Fitzgerald struck again with a sack to put A&M's punter in the shadow of his own goal post.

A big return by Brandon Banks, paired with a face mask penalty at the end of the return, helped set up another quick strike by K-State's offense. Thomas scored his second touchdown of the day on a three-yard pitch-and-run to the right corner of the end zone on the third play of the drive, and the Wildcats went ahead 17–0 with 3:34 remaining in the first quarter.

Thomas scored his third touchdown of the day to pull further ahead, 24–0, on a nine-yard rush to the left midway through the second quarter. The 67-yard scoring drive was set up by a 45-yard completion to tight end Jeron Mastrud on the second play. The catch was Mastrud's 100th of his career to put him 10th all-time at K-State.

Just as Texas A&M began to move the ball with its first significant drive of the evening, Tysyn Hartman picked off a pass across the middle in the redzone and the first surrendered by A&M quarterback Jerrod Johnson all season. Johnson had thrown 225 passes without being intercepted this season. The pick was Hartman's fourth of the year as well.

The Daniel Thomas show continued heading into the locker room at the half. With just over a minute left in the second quarter, Thomas scored on a 17-yard rush as the quarterback out of the Wildcat formation. The score gave him four touchdowns in the first half alone and gave K-State a 31–0 lead.

A fumble recovery by Joseph Kassanavoid at the 16-yard line with 15 seconds remaining put K-State in a position to put more points on the board heading into the locker room at halftime. On the ensuing play Grant Gregory found Collin Klein alone in the end zone for a 16-yard touchdown pass and a 38–0 lead at halftime.

The Wildcats controlled the clock in the second half with its ground game, and the Aggies still could not stop it. Keithen Valentine scored his second touchdown of the game on a 20-yard scamper to the end zone that saw him change directions twice before cutting it across the middle for the score to pull ahead 59–0.

A&M scored 14 unanswered points in the third quarter to cut the lead to 59–14, but it would not be enough as the Wildcats continued to milk the clock keeping the ball in bounds and gaining first downs.

=== Colorado ===
	1	2	3	4	Total
Colorado	6	0	0	0	6
Kansas State	3	17	0	0	20

Kansas State's defense came up big against Colorado to give the Wildcats a 20-6 homecoming victory and remain atop the Big 12 North standings. K-State limited the Buffaloes to 244 total yards on offense and just 60 on the ground.

While the Wildcat defense was able to shut down the Buffalo offense, K-State's own offense controlled the tempo of the game with quick strikes in the first half to build a lead and long clock-eating drives in the second half to hold off the Buffaloes.

After Colorado (2–5, 1–2 Big 12) scored on its opening drive, K-State (5–3, 3–1) stifled the Buffaloes the remainder of the game by not surrendering any points. This was the lowest point total allowed to a Big 12 opponent by the K-State defense since Oct. 8, 2005 against Kansas.

With Colorado threatening to score late in the game on fourth down from the two-yard line, Emmanuel Lamur came up with his second interception of the day to preserve the win. Both of Lamur's interceptions were 50-50 balls where he ripped the ball out of a receiver's hands as they both got to the play at the same time.

Running back Daniel Thomas carried much of the load for K-State with a career-high 145 yards rushing on 20 carries with one score. Defensively for K-State, Ulla Pomele led with seven tackles, including his first sack of the season. Jeffrey Fitzgerald continued his strong play from a week ago with 1.5 sacks and a number of quarterback pressures.

A 35-yard rush by Thomas down the K-State sideline helped the Wildcats march down the field on their first drive of the game and put points on the board first with a 24-yard field goal by Josh Cherry to cap off the drive of 61 yards. Cherry has converted four straight field goal opportunities and remains perfect in Big 12 action.

The Buffaloes also scored on their first drive of the game to answer K-State's field goal with a touchdown by running back Rodney Stewart. Colorado would miss the extra point, however, to lead 6–3.

Thomas tallied his ninth touchdown run of the season early in the second quarter, as the Wildcats completed a 58-yard drive to reclaim the lead, 10–6.

K-State saw the momentum shift to its side with the game's first turnover, when Colorado quarterback Tyler Hansen fumbled the snap on a first-and-20 situation from the Buffaloes' own 15-yard line. Pomele recovered the fumble for the Wildcats, and K-State kicked a 27-yard field goal after the Wildcats could not punch the ball into the endzone to lead, 13–6.

All the swing plays seemed to go K-State's way in the first half with a muffed punt by Colorado gave the Wildcats the ball at the Colorado 20-yard line with 3:35 remaining in the second quarter. After the Buffaloes forced a three-and-out on defense, Jason Espinoza muffed the punt and K-State long-snapper Corey Adams recovered the ball for K-State.

The Wildcats would take full advantage of the turnover this time around, as Gregory punched the ball in on a rush up the middle for five yards to go ahead 20–6 with just over a minute remaining in the half.

Another turnover in the closing seconds of the half gave K-State a shot at the endzone to finish the half. Lamur ripped a pass out of the hands of a Colorado receiver for an interception as they both went up for the ball at the same time. The pick gave K-State the ball at its own 46-yard line but could not score heading into the locker room.

The third quarter saw each team's defense shutdown the respective offenses with no points being scored. K-State gained just 49 yards in the third quarter while Colorado could only muster 25 with negative-three yards rushing thanks to a number of sacks and quarterback pressures by K-State.

=== Oklahoma ===
	1	2	3	4	Total
Kansas State	0	9	14	7	30
Oklahoma	21	7	0	14	42

Senior Brandon Banks tied the K-State school record with 351 all-purpose yards, including 98 on his fifth career kickoff return for a touchdown in the fourth quarter, but it wasn't enough as the Wildcats fell to No. 22 Oklahoma, 42–30 at Memorial Stadium.

Banks totaled 195 yards on six kickoff returns to go with nine catches for 156 yards against the Sooners. The 351 all-purpose yards tied Darren Sproles' school record, which he set against Louisiana–Lafayette on Sept. 18, 2004. Banks, who helped the Wildcats' close the gap with his return, increased his Big 12 and school records with his fifth career kickoff return and fourth this season.

K-State (5–4, 3–2 Big 12) fell behind 21–0 to Oklahoma (5–3, 3–1 Big 12), but rallied to within five points on two occasions, including 35–30 after Banks' 98-yard return. However, the Sooners put the game away with a 3-yard run by DeMarco Murray with 6:27 remaining in the fourth quarter.

The Sooners stopped Kansas State on downs at the K-State 41 with 4:10 left and Quinton Carter intercepted a pass from Grant Gregory at the Oklahoma 2 with 42 seconds left.

Despite the loss, the Wildcat offense totaled 30 points on the stingy Sooner defense, which previous opponent high was 21 points against Miami. The squad tallied 364 yards of total offense, including 215 through the air, and posted 20 first downs. K-State also remained atop the conference's North Division.

Senior quarterback Grant Gregory was solid on the night, completing 19-of-30 passes for 174 yards to go with 46 yards on the ground on nine carries. It marked season-high for Gregory in passing yards, completions and attempts.

Junior running back Daniel Thomas, who is 98 yards from 1,000 yards this season, rushed for 88 yards on 16 carries. He also completed one pass for 41 yards and had a 2-point conversion to Jeron Mastrud on the Wildcats' second touchdown. Senior running back Keithen Valentine had just four carries, but two of those went for scores, including a 14-yard scamper on fourth-and-one in the third quarter.

Oklahoma was led by redshirt freshman quarterback Landry Jones, who completed 26 of 37 passes for 294 yards and four touchdowns. DeJuan Miller, who had 11 catches all season entering the game, led the Sooners with nine for 94 yards, while Ryan Broyles had eight for 91 yards and two touchdowns.

Running backs Chris Brown and DeMarco Murray combined for 145 yards rushing for the Sooners, including 83 from Brown on 15 carries.

Oklahoma has won 28 straight home games, the longest active streak in the Bowl Subdivision. Oklahoma was favored by 28 points going into the game.

=== Kansas ===
This was the 107th meeting between Kansas and Kansas State. Kansas was favored by 2½ points going into the game.

	1	2	3	4	Total
Kansas	0	7	0	3	10
Kansas State	0	10	7	0	17

=== Missouri ===
	1	2	3	4	Total
Missouri	3	14	7	14	38
Kansas State	3	3	6	0	12

=== Nebraska ===
	1	2	3	4	Total
Kansas State	3	0	0	0	3
Nebraska	3	7	7	0	17

== Coaching staff ==
The following is a list of coaches at Kansas State for the 2009 season.

Name	Position
Bill Snyder	Head coach
Vic Koenning	Asst. Head Coach/Co-Defensive Coordinator
Chris Cosh	Asst. Head Coach/Co-Defensive Coordinator
Joe Bob Clements	Defensive Ends
Mo Latimore	Defensive Line
Dana Dimel	Running Game Coordinator/Running Backs
Del Miller	Passing Game Coordinator/Quarterbacks
Charlie Dickey	Offensive Line
Ricky Rahne	Tight Ends
Michael Smith	Wide Receivers
Joe Gordon	Recruiting Operations
Jonathan Beasley	Offensive Graduate Assistant
Kyle Williams	Defensive Graduate Assistant
Sean Snyder	Associate A.D./Assoc. HC of Football Operations and Devel.

== Roster ==
2009 roster
Quarterbacks: 4 Chris Harper - So.; 6 Grant Gregory - Sr.; 12 Collin Klein - (redshirt) Fr.; 14 Carson Coffman - Jr.; 16 Joseph Kassanavoid - (redshirt) Fr.; Running backs: 8 Daniel Thomas - Jr.; 21 Frank Delrue - So.; 25 Keithen Valentine - Sr.; 26 Jarell Childs - (redshirt) Fr.; 33 John Hubert - Fr.; 40 Rodney Kenner - So.; 41 William Powell - Jr.; Full backs: 30 Jay Hanley - Fr.; 48 Braden Wilson - Fr.; 49 Lucas Hamm - Jr.; Wide receivers: 3 Bobby Hauver - (redshirt) Fr.; 5 Brodrick Smith - So.; 7 Lamark Brown - Jr.; 17 Cole Bachamp - So.; 20 Russell Simons - So.; 29 Cameron Morrison - Sr.; 81 Attrail Snipes - Sr.; 82 Adrian Hilburn - Jr.; 83 Brandon Banks - Sr.; 84 Matt Wykes - (redshirt) Sr.; 86 Tramaine Thompson - Fr.; 87 Sheldon Smith - Jr.; 88 Brice Vignery - Sr.; 89 Aubrey Quarles - Sr.; Tight ends: 18 Andre McDonald - Fr.; 43 Jeremy Sutton - Jr.; 47 Gabe Gantz - Jr.; 80 Travis Tannahill - Fr.; 85 Jeron Mastrud - Sr.	Offensive line: 42 Corey Adams - Jr. (long snapper); 54 Trevor Viers - (redshirt) Jr.; 59 Zach Kendall - Jr.; 62 Logan Wiltfong - Fr.; 63 Marcus Heit - Fr. (long snapper); 64 Nick Stringer -Sr.; 65 Aaron Jackson - (redshirt) Fr.; 66 Eric Benoit - (redshirt) Sr.; 67 Kenneth Mayfield - Jr.; 68 William Cooper - Fr.; 69 Nick Ward - So.; 70 Zach Hanson - (redshirt) So.; 71 Ethan Douglas - (redshirt) Fr.; 72 Kaleb Drinkgern - So.; 73 Will Lawson - Fr; 74 Wade Weibert - (redshirt) Jr.; 75 Clyde Aufner - So.; 76 Brock Unruh - Sr.; 77 Colton Freeze - So.; 78 Cornelius Lucas - Fr.; 79 Keneen Taylor - Fr.; Defensive line: 46 Prizell Brown - Fr.; 57 Grant Valentine - Jr.; 60 Dustin Sobieraj - So.; 90 Eric Childs – Sr.; 91 Brandon Harold - So.; 92 Josh Sutton - Jr.; 93 Gabriel Crews - Jr.; 94 Raphael Guidry - So.; 95 Jeffrey Fitzgerald - Sr.; 96 Payton Kirk - So.; 97 Chidubamu Abana - Sr.; 98 Kyle Brown - Fr.; 99 Daniel Calvin - Sr.	Linebackers: 32 Roman Fiels - Fr.; 38 Jack Reed - Sr.; 39 John Houlik - Sr.; 40 Antonio Felder - Jr.; 44 Josh Berard - (redshirt) Jr.; 45 Kevin Rohlder - Jr.; 47 Sean Bighems - Jr.; 48 Jarett Wright - Jr.; 49 Aaron King - So.; 50 Hansen Sekona - Sr.; 51 Ulla Pomelle - Sr.; 52 Taylor Kuhlman - Fr.; 53 Blake Slaughter - Fr.; 55 Kadero Terrell - So.; 56 Alex Hrebec - So.; 58 Clarence Bumpas - Fr.; 59 Brian Hertzog - So.; Defensive backs: 2 Tysyn Hartman - So.; 3 Billy McClellan - Sr.; 4 Joshua Moore - (redshirt) Jr.; 5 Chris Carney - Sr.; 8 Stephen Harrison - Jr.; 13 Adrian Stryker - Sr.; 14 Cole Blair - Fr.; 15 Darious Thomas - Fr.; 16 Terrance Sweeney - Jr.; 20 Courtney Herndon - Sr.; 21 Troy Butler - Jr.; 22 Thomas Ferguson - Fr.; 23 Emmanuel Lamur - So.; 24 Dahrnaz Tigner - Jr.; 26 Brett Childers - Sr.; 27 David Garrett - Jr.; 28 Logan Dold - So.; 29 Otis Johnson - Sr.; 30 Drew Mueller - Fr.; 31 Torell Miller - Fr.; 36 Luke Clements - Fr.; 37 Rashad Harrell - Sr.; 41 Charles Melton - Fr.; 43 Marc St. Felix - Fr.; Punters: 10 D.J. Fulhage - Jr.; 15 Luis Barroeta - Fr.; 17 George Pierson - Sr.; Kickers: 6 Brandon Klimek - (redshirt) Fr.; 12 James French - Fr.; 18 Anthony Cantele - Fr.; 19 Josh Cherry - Jr.

== Statistics ==
=== Team ===
	K-State	Opp
Scoring	276	280
Points per Game	23.0	23.3
First downs	222	221
Rushing	2,159	1,265
Passing	2,033	2,814
Penalty	723	733
Total offense	4,192	4,079
Avg per Play	5.2	5.4
Avg per Game	349.3	339.9
Fumbles-Lost	23-10	16-12
Penalties-Yards	84-723	74-733
Avg per Game	60.2	61.1

	K-State	Opp
Punts-Yards	55-2,120	61-2,500
Avg per Punt	38.5	41.0
Time of possession/Game	33:48	26;12
3rd down conversions	56-164	64-156
4th down conversions	13/23	7/11
Touchdowns scored	34	36
Field goals-Attempts-Long	13/21-47	10/13-?
PAT-Attempts	29/32	34/36
Attendance	280,579	301,143
Games/Avg per Game	46,763	60,229

==== Scores by quarter ====
	1	2	3	4	Total
K-State	52	91	82	51	276
Opponents	64	89	56	71	280

=== Offense ===
==== Rushing ====
Name	GP	Att	Gain	Loss	Net	Avg	TD	Long	Avg/G
Daniel Thomas	12	247	1,290	25	1,265	5.1	11	40	105.4
Keithen Valentine	12	55	374	17	357	6.5	6	61	29.8
Grant Gregory	11	106	441	133	308	2.9	3	21	28.0
TEAM	10	12	0	22	-22	-1.8	0	0	-2.2
Total	12	504	2,488	329	2,159	4.3	22	61	179.9
Opponents	12	362	1,557	292	1,265	3.5	10	44	105.4

==== Passing ====
Name	GP	Effic	Att-Cmp-Int	Pct	Yds	TD	Lng	Avg/G
Grant Gregory	11	112.7	100-175-4	57.1	1,096	4	54	99.6
Carson Coffman	6	121.2	71-117-4	60.7	860	2	64	143.3
Total	12	118.4	175-298-8	58.7	2,033	7	64	169.4
Opponents	12	132.6	231-395-13	58.5	2,814	25	80	234.5

==== Receiving ====
Name	GP	No.	Yds	Avg	TD	Long	Avg/G
Brandon Banks	12	56	705	12.6	1	64	58.8
Attrail Snipes	12	28	424	15.1	2	40	35.3
Daniel Thomas	12	25	257	10.3	0	52	21.4
Jeron Mastrud	12	21	233	11.11	1	45	19.4
Lamark Brown	12	18	215	11.9	2	40	17.9
Total	12	175	2,033	11.6	7	64	169.4
Opponents	12	231	2,814	12.2	25	80	234.5
