= Ward Park (Raymore) =

Park in Raymore, Missouri, United States

- Interactive map of Ward Park
- Type: Public park
- Location: Raymore, Missouri
- Coordinates: 38.8162°N 94.4097°W
- Area: 3.88 acres (1.57 ha)
- Operator: City of Raymore
- Status: Open all year

Ward Park is a public, urban park in Raymore, Missouri, United States. Located on 3.88 acres on the western end of Sierra Drive in Ward Park Place subdivision, Ward Park received playground equipment and a paved walking trail in 2011. The park was closed as a part of the continuing efforts to slow the spread of the Coronavirus COVID-19. It is part of the Kansas City metropolitan area.
