= Raymore–Peculiar High School =

Location
- 20801 South School Road; Peculiar, Missouri 64078; United States
- 38°44′56″N 94°27′28″W

Information
- Type: Public
- Motto: Preparing EACH Student for a Successful and Meaningful Life
- School district: Raymore-Peculiar R-II School District
- Superintendent: Mike Slagle
- Principal: Scott Bacon
- Staff: 118.38 (FTE)
- Grades: 9–12
- Enrollment: 2,091 (2024–25)
- Student to teacher ratio: 17.66
- Colors: Black, white, and gold
- Mascot: Panther
- Information: 816-892-1400
- Website: www.raypec.org/o/rphs

Raymore–Peculiar High School (Ray-Pec) is a public high school in Peculiar, Missouri, United States. It is a part of the Raymore-Peculiar School District. The school's mascot is the Panther, and the official colors are black, white, and gold. It is a participant in Missouri's A+ Program.

The boundary of its school district, and therefore its attendance boundary, includes sections of Cass County, Missouri. This includes all of Peculiar and Raymore as well as an eastern portion of Belton, sections of Lee's Summit, and much of Lake Winnebago, as well as unincorporated areas.

== Academics ==
=== Dual-credit ===
Raymore–Peculiar High School offers a dual-credit program, where students earn high school credit and also college credit hours. These courses range from college-level Spanish to Calculus or English. Participating post-secondary institutions include UMKC, the University of Central Missouri, and the MCCKC.

=== AP credit ===
The school includes the Advanced Placement program, which offers university-level material to gifted/motivated students. Multiple courses are offered for exam preparation, including:

- AP Biology
- AP Chemistry
- AP World History
- AP US Government and Politics
- AP English Language and Composition
- AP English Literature and Composition
- AP Studio Art
- AP Music Theory

AP French Language and AP Spanish Language (through independent study) courses are available.

=== IB credit ===
Students may enroll in IB (International Baccalaureate) courses and graduate with an IB certificate(s) or IB diploma. The IB program is made for students all around the world and is extremely rigorous.

== Notable alumni ==
- Gary Cochran - Raymore police officer and local farmer
- Carson Coffman - Arena Football League player
- Chase Coffman - former NFL tight end
- Luke Grimm - Kansas Jayhawks football player
