= Hawk Ridge Park =

Public park in Raymore, Missouri, U.S.

- Interactive map of Hawk Ridge Park
- Type: Public park
- Location: Raymore, Missouri
- Coordinates: 38.8208°N 94.4695°W
- Area: 79 acres (32 ha)
- Operator: City of Raymore
- Status: Open all year

Hawk Ridge Park is a public, urban park in Raymore, Missouri. Located at 701 Johnston Parkway in Raymore, Hawk Ridge Park is largely undeveloped. The park contains a stocked lake, rolling hills, and a limited walking trail.
