= Watkins Family Farm Historic District =

Historic district in Missouri, United States

- U.S. National Register of Historic Places
- U.S. Historic district
- Location within Missouri Location within the United States
- Location: 19116 S. School Rd., Raymore, Missouri
- Coordinates: 38°46′32″N 94°27′36″W
- Area: 220 acres (89 ha)
- Built by: Watkins, Charles F. and Charles W.; Allen, George E.
- Architectural style: Prairie School
- NRHP reference No.: 07000376
- Added to NRHP: May 2, 2007

Watkins Family Farm Historic District, also known as Lakeland Farm, is a historic home and farm and national historic district located near Raymore, Cass County, Missouri. The farm includes 18 contributing buildings, three contributing sites, and 21 contributing structures dated between about 1868 and 1957. They include three residential buildings, eight barns, three machine and implement sheds, four wells, ten dams and ponds, and a number of ancillary structures such as a milk house, a pump house, an outhouse, a silo, two corn bins, two chicken coops, three cattle feeder structures, and a cattle loading ramp. The Allen-Watkins Residence was built in 1913, and is a 2 1/2-story, Prairie School style frame dwelling built from the Sears and Roebuck Company prefabricated kit for Sears House Plan #227, "The Castleton."

It was listed on the National Register of Historic Places in 2007.
