= Simone Awards =

Award for outstanding contributions to high school football

The Simone Awards are a group of awards presented to individuals for their outstanding contributions to high school football in the Kansas City Metropolitan Area.

Beginning with a single award in 1931 presented by Dr. D. M. Nigro, the Simone Awards now represent a group of 6 awards presented to players, broadcasters and coaches to celebrate their efforts on and off the field.

- Thomas A. Simone Memorial Award - Outstanding high school football player
- Frank Fontana Memorial Award - Outstanding small class high school football player
- Junious "Buck" Buchanan Memorial Award - Outstanding big class lineman/linebacker
- Bobby Bell Award - Outstanding small class defensive player
- Otis Taylor Award - Outstanding tight end/wide receiver
- Gordon Docking Award - Outstanding broadcaster
- Metro Sports Kansas and Missouri Coaches of the Year - Outstanding Coach

== See also ==
- Thomas A. Simone Award
