= Raymore-Peculiar R-II School District =

School district in Missouri, U.S.

Address
- 21005 South School Road Peculiar, Missouri, 64078; United States

District information
- Type: Public
- Grades: PreK–12
- NCES District ID: 2923730

Students and staff
- Students: 6,290 (2020–2021)
- Teachers: 439.05 (on an FTE basis)
- Staff: 437.75 (on an FTE basis)
- Student–teacher ratio: 14.33:1

Other information
- Website: www.raypec.org

The Raymore-Peculiar R-II School District (Ray-Pec) is a public school district with its headquarters in Peculiar, Missouri, United States. It is a suburban school district in a quickly developing area, and many new students are being enrolled.

The district, in Cass County, includes all of Peculiar and Raymore as well as an eastern portion of Belton, sections of Lee's Summit, and much of Lake Winnebago, as well as unincorporated areas.

== Schools ==
The district operates 7 elementary schools, 2 middle schools and 3 high schools.

=== Elementary schools ===
- Bridle Ridge Elementary School(K-5)
- Creekmoor Elementary School(K-5)
- Eagle Glenn Elementary School(K-5)
- Peculiar Elementary School(K-5)
- Raymore Elementary School(K-5)
- Stonegate Elementary School(K-5)
- Timber Creek Elementary School(K-5)
- Shull Early Learning Center(PK)[8]

=== Middle schools ===
- Raymore-Peculiar East Middle School(6–8)
- Raymore-Peculiar South Middle School(6–8)

=== High schools ===
- Raymore-Peculiar High School (10–12)
- Raymore-Peculiar Academy(9–12)
- Raymore-Peculiar 9th Grade Center(9)[12]
