= Lake Winnebago, Missouri =

- City
- Location of Lake Winnebago, Missouri
- Coordinates: 38°49′47″N 94°22′42″W
- Country: United States
- State: Missouri
- County: Cass

Area
  - Total: 2.73 sq mi (7.08 km^{2})
  - Land: 2.32 sq mi (6.01 km^{2})
  - Water: 0.41 sq mi (1.07 km^{2})
- Elevation: 951 ft (290 m)

Population (2020)
  - Total: 1,433
  - Density: 617.8/sq mi (238.52/km^{2})
- Time zone: UTC-6 (Central (CST))
  - Summer (DST): UTC-5 (CDT)
- Area codes: 816, 975
- FIPS code: 29-40340
- GNIS feature ID: 2395607
- Website: cityoflakewinnebago.com

Lake Winnebago is a city in Cass County, Missouri, United States. The population was 1,433 at the 2020. It is part of the Kansas City metropolitan area.

== History ==
Lake Winnebago was incorporated first as a village in 1963. Afterwards, in 1975, it was upgraded to a 4th Class City through an election.

== Geography ==
According to the United States Census Bureau, the city has a total area of 2.72 square miles (7.04 km^{2}), of which 2.28 square miles (5.91 km^{2}) is land and 0.44 square miles (1.14 km^{2}) is water.

The city of Lake Winnebago comprises two wards, both of which closely surround the eponymous Lake Winnebago in north-central Cass County.

== Demographics ==
Historical population
Census	Pop.	Note	%±
1970	432		—
1980	681		57.6%
1990	748		9.8%
2000	902		20.6%
2010	1,131		25.4%
2020	1,433		26.7%
U.S. Decennial Census

=== Racial and ethnic composition ===
Lake Winnebago city, Missouri – Racial and ethnic composition Note: the US Census treats Hispanic/Latino as an ethnic category. This table excludes Latinos from the racial categories and assigns them to a separate category. Hispanics/Latinos may be of any race.
Race / Ethnicity (NH = Non-Hispanic)	Pop 2000	Pop 2010	Pop 2020	% 2000	% 2010	% 2020
White alone (NH)	877	1,095	1,331	97.23%	96.82%	92.88%
Black or African American alone (NH)	0	2	3	0.00%	0.18%	0.21%
Native American or Alaska Native alone (NH)	1	1	2	0.11%	0.09%	0.14%
Asian alone (NH)	2	2	10	0.22%	0.18%	0.70%
Native Hawaiian or Pacific Islander alone (NH)	0	2	0	0.00%	0.18%	0.00%
Other race alone (NH)	0	0	5	0.00%	0.00%	0.35%
Mixed race or Multiracial (NH)	1	11	46	0.11%	0.97%	3.21%
Hispanic or Latino (any race)	21	18	36	2.33%	1.59%	2.51%
Total	902	1,131	1,433	100.00%	100.00%	100.00%

=== 2010 census ===
As of the census of 2010, there were 1,131 people, 456 households, and 378 families living in the city. The population density was 496.1 inhabitants per square mile (191.5/km^{2}). There were 496 housing units at an average density of 217.5 per square mile (84.0/km^{2}). The racial makeup of the city was 97.7% White, 0.2% African American, 0.1% Native American, 0.2% Asian, 0.4% Pacific Islander, 0.5% from other races, and 1.0% from two or more races. Hispanic or Latino of any race were 1.6% of the population.

There were 456 households, of which 27.4% had children under the age of 18 living with them, 77.2% were married couples living together, 4.2% had a female householder with no husband present, 1.5% had a male householder with no wife present, and 17.1% were non-families. 14.9% of all households were made up of individuals, and 7.7% had someone living alone who was 65 years of age or older. The average household size was 2.48 and the average family size was 2.73.

The median age in the city was 50.9 years. 20.1% of residents were under the age of 18; 4.6% were between the ages of 18 and 24; 15.3% were from 25 to 44; 39.9% were from 45 to 64; and 20.2% were 65 years of age or older. The gender makeup of the city was 47.7% male and 52.3% female.

=== 2000 census ===
As of the census of 2000, there were 902 people, 350 households, and 289 families living in the city. The population density was 478.6 inhabitants per square mile (184.8/km^{2}). There were 359 housing units at an average density of 190.5 per square mile (73.6/km^{2}). The racial makeup of the city was 99.11% White, 0.11% Native American, 0.22% Asian, 0.33% from other races, and 0.22% from two or more races. Hispanic or Latino of any race were 2.33% of the population.

There were 350 households, out of which 27.7% had children under the age of 18 living with them, 77.4% were married couples living together, 2.9% had a female householder with no husband present, and 17.4% were non-families. 14.6% of all households were made up of individuals, and 6.6% had someone living alone who was 65 years of age or older. The average household size was 2.58 and the average family size was 2.84.

In the city the population was spread out, with 21.5% under the age of 18, 4.9% from 18 to 24, 22.6% from 25 to 44, 38.7% from 45 to 64, and 12.3% who were 65 years of age or older. The median age was 46 years. For every 100 females, there were 92.7 males. For every 100 females age 18 and over, there were 96.1 males.

The median income for a household in the city was $78,478, and the median income for a family was $87,150. Males had a median income of $56,500 versus $37,361 for females. The per capita income for the city was $41,891. None of the families and 1.6% of the population were living below the poverty line, including no under eighteens and none of those over 64.

== Education ==
Much of Lake Winnebago is in Raymore-Peculiar School District, while other parts are in Lee's Summit R-VII School District. The comprehensive high school of the former is Raymore-Peculiar High School.

== Notable person ==
- Mark Alford, U.S. representative and former broadcast journalist
