= Evan Boehm =

American football player (born 1993)

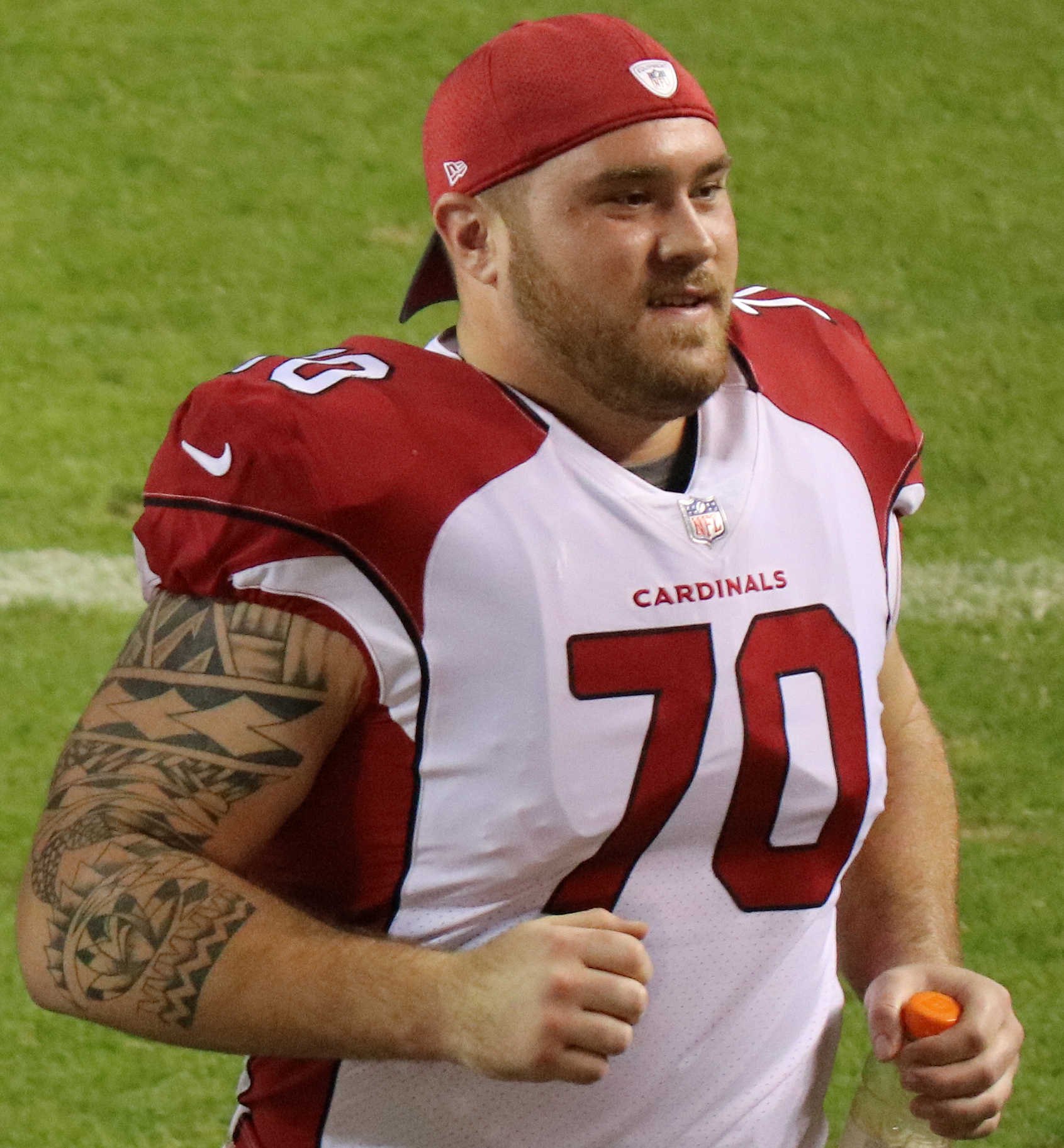
- Boehm with the Arizona Cardinals in 2017

No. 70, 67, 76
- Position: Center

Personal information
- Born: August 19, 1993 (age 33); Lee's Summit, Missouri, U.S.
- Listed height: 6 ft 3 in (1.91 m)
- Listed weight: 321 lb (146 kg)

Career information
- High school: Lee's Summit West
- College: Missouri
- NFL draft: 2016: 4th round, 128th overall pick

Career history
- Arizona Cardinals (2016–2017); Los Angeles Rams (2018)*; Indianapolis Colts (2018); Miami Dolphins (2019); Buffalo Bills (2020)*; Jacksonville Jaguars (2020)*; Detroit Lions (2021)*; Miami Dolphins (2021)*; New York Giants (2021)*
- * Offseason or practice squad member only

Career NFL statistics
- Games played: 55
- Games started: 21
- Stats at Pro Football Reference

Evan Boehm (born August 19, 1993) is an American former professional football player who was a center in the National Football League (NFL). He played college football for the Missouri Tigers.

== Early life ==
At Missouri, Boehm was teammates with Markus Golden and both served as team captains for the Tigers. As a junior in high school in 2010, Boehm was centerpiece on the Lee's Summit West High School team that won the Missouri Class 5 State Championship. As a senior in 2011, Boehm won the Thomas A. Simone Award, which is given to the most outstanding high school football player in the Kansas City Metro Area. Boehm's father, Royce, was his high school head football coach.

== College career ==
Boehm earned a verbal scholarship from Missouri when he was in eighth grade, before he even started high school. As a starter all four years at Missouri, he set a school record with 52 consecutive starts. As a freshman, he started 12 games at left guard before starting 40 consecutive games at center in his final three years after switching positions prior to his sophomore year.

== Professional career ==
Pre-draft measurables
| Height | Weight | Arm length | Hand span | 40-yard dash | 10-yard split | 20-yard split | 20-yard shuttle | Three-cone drill | Vertical jump | Broad jump | Bench press |
|---|---|---|---|---|---|---|---|---|---|---|---|
| 6 ft 2 1/8 in (1.88 m) | 302 lb (137 kg) | 32 1/2 in (0.83 m) | 10 1/4 in (0.26 m) | 5.33 s | 1.91 s | 3.12 s | 4.69 s | 7.52 s | 28.5 in (0.72 m) | 8 ft 0 in (2.44 m) | 24 reps |
All values from NFL Combine

=== Arizona Cardinals ===
Boehm was selected by the Arizona Cardinals in the fourth round, 128th overall, in the 2016 NFL draft.

Boehm entered the 2017 season as the Cardinals starting right guard. He started the first five games before losing the starting job to Earl Watford. He then started the final three games at right guard in place of the injured Watford.

On September 2, 2018, Boehm was waived by the Cardinals.

=== Los Angeles Rams ===
On September 4, 2018, Boehm was signed to the practice squad of the Los Angeles Rams.

=== Indianapolis Colts ===
On October 8, 2018, Boehm was signed by the Indianapolis Colts off the Rams' practice squad. He played in 11 games, starting four at center in place of an injured Ryan Kelly.

=== Miami Dolphins (first stint) ===
On August 30, 2019, Boehm was traded to the Miami Dolphins along with a 2020 7th draft pick for a 2020 6th draft pick.

=== Buffalo Bills ===
Boehm signed with the Buffalo Bills on April 16, 2020. He was released on September 5, 2020, and signed to the practice squad the next day. He was placed on the practice squad/injured list on September 23. He was released on October 12, 2020.

=== Jacksonville Jaguars ===
On November 2, 2020, Boehm was signed to the Jacksonville Jaguars' practice squad. He was released on December 14, and re-signed to the practice squad the next day. His practice squad contract with the team expired after the season on January 11, 2021.

=== Detroit Lions ===
On August 2, 2021, Boehm signed with the Detroit Lions. He was placed on injured reserve on August 16, 2021. He was released on August 23, 2021.

=== Miami Dolphins (second stint) ===
On November 9, 2021, Boehm was signed to Dolphins practice squad. He was released on November 29.

=== New York Giants ===
On December 16, 2021, the New York Giants signed Boehm to their practice squad. On December 27, 2021, Boehm was released.
