= Athens High School (Ohio) =

Public high school in The Plains, Ohio, USA

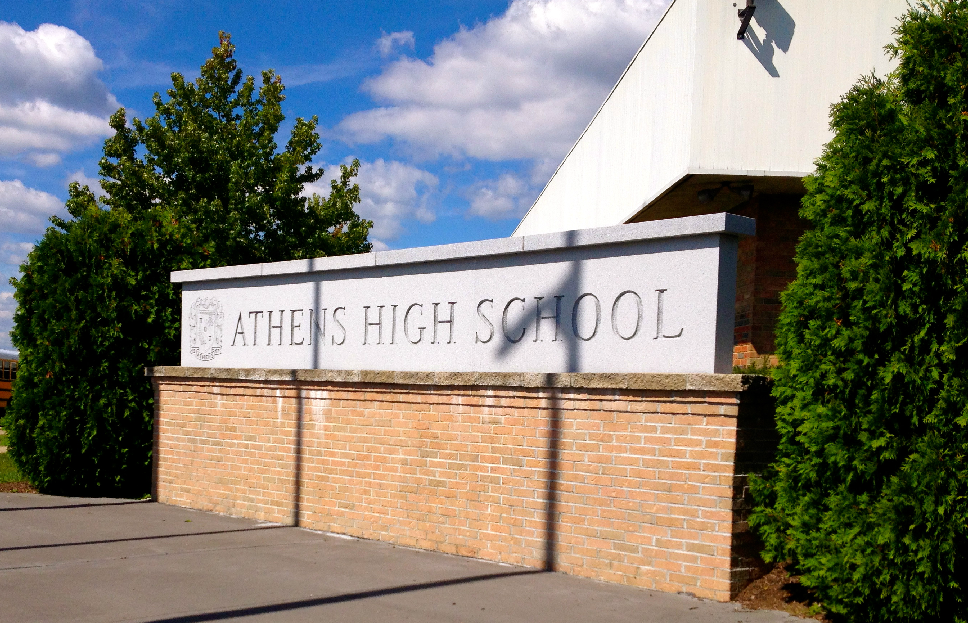

Location
- 1 High School Road; The Plains, Ohio 45780; United States; 39°22′21″N 82°7′42″W

Information
- Type: Public, Coeducational
- Established: 1967
- Superintendent: Chad Springer
- School code: 360-245
- Principal: April Stewart
- Teaching staff: 44.00 (FTE)
- Grades: 9–12
- Enrollment: 693 (2023–24)
- Student to teacher ratio: 15.75
- Colors: Old Gold and Dark Green
- Athletics conference: Tri-Valley Conference - Ohio Division
- Mascot: Bulldog
- Team name: Bulldogs
- Accreditation: North Central Association of Colleges and Schools
- Newspaper: Matrix
- Yearbook: Arena
- Website: ahs.athenscsd.org

Athens High School (AHS) is a public high school in The Plains, Ohio which is located in southeast Ohio. It is the only high school in the Athens City School District. The AHS mascot is a Bulldog, and its school colors are green and gold. The Plains is located five miles (8 km) northwest of Athens, Ohio.

== History ==
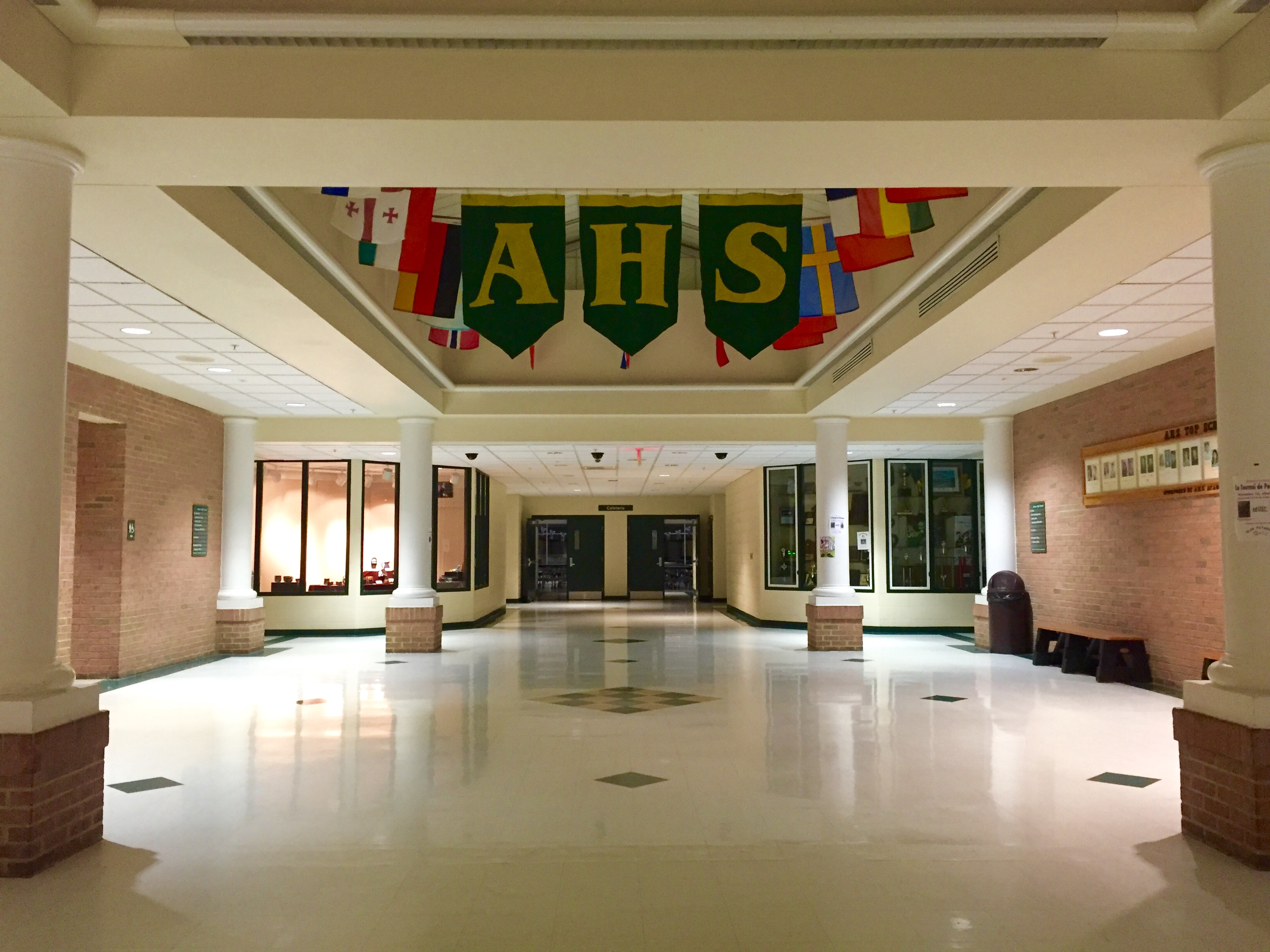
The Athens High School Atrium

The first public supported Athens High School in Athens, Ohio graduated nine students in 1859. Athens High School held classes in at least three different buildings from the 1850s until the current building opened in The Plains in 1968. Athens High School as known today was formed in 1967 by the merger of the students from The Plains High School, Chauncey-Dover High School, and Athens High School.

On September 16, 2010, a tornado came over The Plains, destroying/damaging many homes and businesses plus destroying most of the football field/track, and damaging the high school. With the help of many, the school reopened in four days and the stadium/track was rebuilt by September 2011.

Today Athens High School is home for students in grades 9th - 12th with many students grade 11th - 12th attending classes at the Tri-County Career Center in Nelsonville.

== School Information ==
In the last ten years the student body has ranged in size from 180 to 230 per-grade level. The school has a number of students each year use the post secondary enrollment options which enables students to take college classes for high school & college credit. This is free to the student and their parents.

Advanced Placement courses include; English Language & Composition, US History, European History, Chemistry, Physics A, Calculus AB, US Government & Politics, Spanish Language, French Language, Computer Science A.

In the 2013–14 school year, Athens High School received an 83.5% Performance Index, with 91.2% of its students graduating in four years.

Graduation Requirements include 4 Units of English, 4 Units of Mathematics, 3 Units of Social Studies, and Science, 1/2 Unit of Health, and PE. In a normal graduating class, 60% to 70% of students plan on attending a 4-year college, with 15% to 25% attending a 2-year college.

== Athletics ==
Athens High School is a member school of the Ohio High School Athletic Association. It offers 11 boys sports (Cheerleading, Baseball, Basketball, Cross Country, Football, Golf, Swimming & Diving, Soccer, Tennis, Track & Field and Wrestling) and 11 girls sports (Cheerleading, Basketball, Cross Country, Golf, Softball, Swimming & Diving, Soccer, Tennis, Track & Field, Volleyball, and Wrestling). The 2014 Bulldogs football team was the first team ever to make it to the OHSAA state final, but lost the contest to Toledo Central Catholic 56–52 to finish 14–1 for the season. In late 2019, Athens High School officially renamed their football stadium after 2015 graduate and 2019 Heisman Trophy winner Joe Burrow, after his Heisman Trophy acceptance speech brought in over $600K in donations to the Athens County Food Pantry.

=== TVC - Tri-Valley Conference ===
The Bulldogs belong to the Ohio High School Athletic Association (OHSAA) and in the fall of 2008 joined the Tri-Valley Conference, a 13-member athletic conference located in southeastern Ohio

== Notable alumni ==
- Joe Burrow – quarterback for the Cincinnati Bengals, Heisman Trophy winner
- Dow Finsterwald – professional golfer; won 1958 PGA Championship.
- Atul Gawande – Boston general surgeon, Harvard University professor, and writer
- Grant Gregory – former professional football quarterback
- Stephen Kappes – Deputy Director of the Central Intelligence Agency during the George W. Bush and Barack Obama administrations
- Maya Lin – creator of the Vietnam Veterans Memorial in Washington, D.C.
- David Wilhelm – campaign manager for Bill Clinton in 1992, Chairman of the Democratic National Committee (1993–1994)
- Philip W. Yun – scholar, lawyer, nonprofit and private sector executive, and former United States government official

== See also ==
- Ohio High School Athletic Conferences
- Tri-Valley Conference
