= Grant Gregory =

American football player (born 1986)

No. 13
- Position: Quarterback

Personal information
- Born: March 10, 1986 (age 40); West Point, New York, U.S.
- Listed height: 6 ft 1 in (1.85 m)
- Listed weight: 205 lb (93 kg)

Career information
- High school: Athens (The Plains, Ohio)
- College: Indiana (2004); South Florida (2005–2008); Kansas State (2009)
- NFL draft: 2010: undrafted

Career history
- Tampa Bay Storm (2011)

Career AFL statistics
- Comp. / Att.: 97 / 153
- Passing yards: 1,025
- TD–INT: 20–7
- Passer rating: 96.45
- Rushing touchdowns: 2
- Stats at ArenaFan.com

Grant Gregory (born March 10, 1986) is an American former football quarterback. He was the starting quarterback for the 2009 Kansas State Wildcats football team. He took over the starting position in the middle of the 2009 season from Carson Coffman.

== Personal ==
His father, Greg, was on the football staff at Army. He earned his bachelor's degree from South Florida on December 15, 2007 and is currently working on his master's degree at Kansas State.

== High school career ==
Gregory was named to the Division III All-Ohio squad by Ohio Prep Scene and also was named first team All-Ohio in Division III by the Associated Press and the Ohio Football Coaches Association. He earned a spot in Big 33 All-Star Game, a prestigious event between Ohio and Pennsylvania where he threw an 82-yard TD pass in that game to the San Francisco 49ers’ Ted Ginn Jr. He threw for 2,085 yards as a senior, completing 115 of 214 attempts and threw for 22 touchdowns. While playing safety, he had 66 tackles and three interceptions on defense. Gregory was a three-time all-league and all-district and the county MVP as a senior where he was selected to play in prestigious Ohio North-South All-Star Game and earned South Offensive Player of the Game honors, completing eight of 14 passes for 202 yards and two touchdowns. He also played baseball and basketball and was a three-sport captain as a senior. He was a .350 career hitter in baseball where he played center field, shortstop and pitcher. He was a three-time all-league and two-time all-county in baseball.

== College career ==
Gregory initially signed on to play at Indiana where redshirted his freshman year. In 2005, Gregory transferred to South Florida and sat out due to transfer rules. He saw some back up duty in 2006, 2007 and 2008. In 2009, Gregory transferred, this time to Kansas State where he soon took over the starting position from Carson Coffman.

== Professional career ==
In 2011, Gregory was signed as a quarterback for the Tampa Bay Storm of the Arena Football League. In their first game of the regular season, their running back was injured. Gregory replaced him to rush for two touchdowns in a 46-40 win over the New Orleans VooDoo.
