= Chase Coffman =

American football player (born 1986)

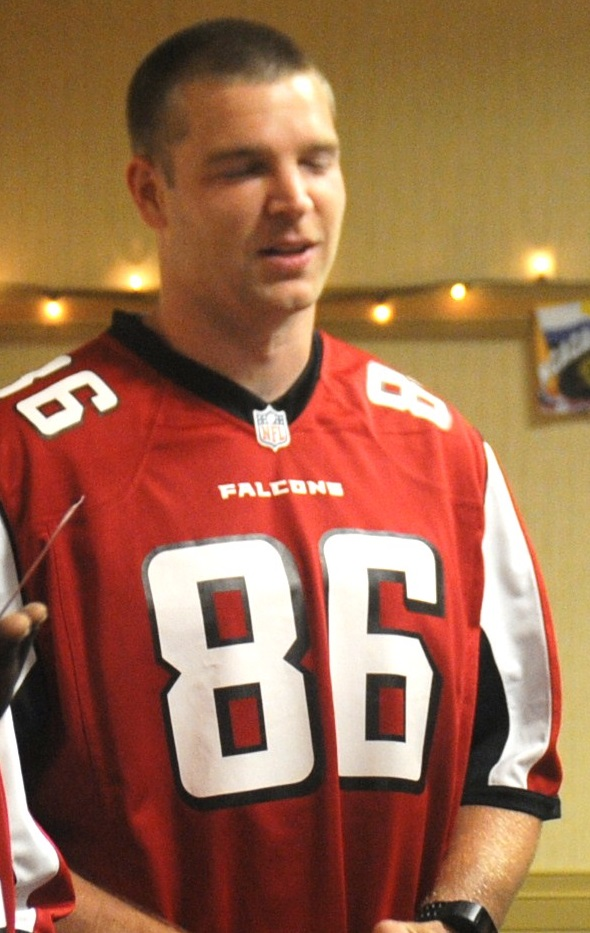
- Coffman with the Atlanta Falcons in 2013

No. 80, 86, 85
- Position: Tight end

Personal information
- Born: November 10, 1986 (age 39); Lee's Summit, Missouri, U.S.
- Listed height: 6 ft 6 in (1.98 m)
- Listed weight: 250 lb (113 kg)

Career information
- High school: Raymore-Peculiar (Peculiar, Missouri)
- College: Missouri
- NFL draft: 2009: 3rd round, 98th overall pick

Career history
- Cincinnati Bengals (2009–2011); Tampa Bay Buccaneers (2012)*; Atlanta Falcons (2012–2013); Tennessee Titans (2014–2015); Seattle Seahawks (2015); Indianapolis Colts (2016)
- * Offseason or practice squad member only

Awards and highlights
- John Mackey Award (2008); Consensus All-American (2008); 2× First-team All-Big 12 (2006, 2008); Second-team All-Big 12 (2007)

Career NFL statistics
- Receptions: 18
- Receiving yards: 177
- Receiving touchdowns: 2
- Stats at Pro Football Reference

Chase Allen Coffman (born November 10, 1986) is an American former professional football player who was a tight end in the National Football League (NFL). He played college football for the Missouri Tigers, earning consensus All-American honors and the John Mackey Award as the best college tight end in the country in 2008. He was chosen by the Cincinnati Bengals in the third round of the 2009 NFL draft.

== Early life ==
Coffman was born in Lee's Summit, Missouri and played high school football at Raymore–Peculiar High School in nearby Peculiar. Coffman had a great high school career receiving passes from his younger brother Carson. He earned first-team all-state honors three times and was a two-time first-team all-district and all-conference pick. During his senior year in 2004, he was named conference player of the year and won the Simone Award after catching 41 passes for 886 yards and 16 touchdowns. He was also a standout basketball player, earning first-team all-conference honors in 2003 and 2004.

College recruiting
Name	Hometown	School	Height	Weight	40^{‡}	Commit date
Chase Coffman; TE	Peculiar, Missouri	Raymore-Peculiar HS	6 ft 6 in (1.98 m)	213 lb (97 kg)	4.83	Dec 18, 2004
Chase Coffman; TE	Recruit ratings: Scout: Rivals:					
Overall recruit ranking: Scout: 9 (TE); 37 (college recruiting) Rivals: 19 (TE); 3 (Missouri); 39 (college recruiting)
‡ Refers to 40-yard dash; Note: In many cases, Scout, Rivals, 247Sports, On3, and ESPN may conflict in their listings of height, weight and 40 time.; In these cases, the average was taken. ESPN grades are on a 100-point scale.; Sources: "2005 Missouri Football Commitment List". Rivals.; "2005 Missouri College Football Team Recruiting Prospects". Scout.; "Scout.com Team Recruiting Rankings". Scout.; "2005 Team Ranking". Rivals.com.

== College career ==
Coffman attended the University of Missouri, where he played for coach Gary Pinkel's Missouri Tigers football team from 2005 to 2008. During his freshman year in 2005, he had one of Missouri's best seasons ever for a tight end. He finished the season with 47 receptions for 503 yards and 4 touchdowns, and earned First-team Freshman All-American honors by Rivals.com. Coffman had an amazing 2006 campaign leading all Big 12 tight ends with 58 catches for 638 yards and nine touchdowns; all of these were also Missouri records for tight ends. Because of his great season he was awarded First-team All-Big 12 and was a finalist for the John Mackey Award. Although not matching his 2006 season he still had a great 2007 season finishing with 52 receptions for 531 yards and 7 touchdowns. Because of his play he was a second-team All-Big 12 selection and again was a finalist for the John Mackey Award. Entering the 2008 season he became Missouri's all-time leader in receiving touchdowns with 20, third in receptions with 156 and seventh in receiving yards with 1,664.

As a senior in 2008, he won the John Mackey Award, given annually to the nation's best tight end. He became the first Missouri player to win the award. He had 90 receptions for 987 receiving yards and 10 touchdowns.

=== Awards and honors ===
- Thomas A. Simone Award (2004)
- John Mackey Award (2008)
- Holds numerous Missouri Tigers team records
- Consensus first-team All-American (selected by AFCA, FWAA, and WCFF, 2008)

== Professional career ==
Pre-draft measurables
Height	Weight	Arm length	Hand span	40-yard dash
6 ft 6 in (1.98 m)	244 lb (111 kg)	33 1/2 in (0.85 m)	9 3/4 in (0.25 m)	4.83 s
40-yard time was taken at Pro Day; arm and hand spans were taken at the NFL Scouting Combine. Coffman did not work out at the combine due to a foot injury.

=== Cincinnati Bengals ===
Coffman was drafted by the Cincinnati Bengals in the third round (98th overall) of the 2009 NFL draft. On December 9, 2009, Coffman was placed on season-ending injured reserve due to a left ankle injury. He finished his rookie season being inactive for all 12 games he was on the active roster.

On September 4, 2010, the Bengals waived Coffman and they re-signed him to their practice squad the next day. A year later, he was waived on September 4, 2011, and signed to the Bengals' practice squad the following day. He was not signed to the Bengals reserve list following the 2011 season after his practice squad contract expired.

=== Tampa Bay Buccaneers ===
On February 21, 2012, the Tampa Bay Buccaneers signed Coffman as a free agent. On August 6, 2012, Coffman was waived.

=== Atlanta Falcons ===
On August 11, 2012, the Atlanta Falcons signed Coffman and two weeks later, on August 25, he was waived. Coffman was signed to the Falcons practice squad on September 2, 2012. Coffman was signed to the Falcons 53-man roster on November 13, 2012. He was released at the end of the Falcons 2013 season.

=== Tennessee Titans ===
Coffman signed with the Tennessee Titans on August 6, 2014. Although Coffman played well in the preseason, catching six passes for 107 yards (a 17.8 per-catch average) and a touchdown, he was released by the Titans on August 30, 2014. The Titans resigned Coffman on September 23, 2014.

On November 9, 2014, after a Zach Mettenberger interception, Coffman ran to the opposing team's sidelines and knocked Baltimore Ravens Assistant Coach Tony Coaxum to the ground. ESPN’s Jamison Hensley characterized the hit against the defenseless coach as "shocking, violent, and appalling," while Fox's Jay Glazer described it as "possibly the cheap shot of the year." Although Coffman later claimed the hit was unintentional, he was fined $30,000 by the NFL.

On November 17, 2014, in a nationally-televised Monday Night Football game, Coffman scored his first career touchdown on a 4-yard touchdown pass from Zach Mettenberger in a 27–24 loss to the Pittsburgh Steelers.

Coffman was re-signed by the Titans as a free agent on July 30, 2015. On September 6, 2015, the Tennessee Titans waived Coffman. He was re-signed the next day. He was waived on October 24, 2015. On October 26, he was re-re-signed by the Titans. On October 31, Coffman was again waived by the Titans.

=== Seattle Seahawks ===
Coffman was signed by the Seattle Seahawks on December 1, 2015, to add depth to the Tight End position after Jimmy Graham was placed on IR with a season ending knee injury. Coffman was waived by the Seahawks on December 8, 2015. On December 15, Coffman was re-signed by the Seattle Seahawks. Coffman scored a touchdown in the final regular-season game rout against the Cardinals on January 3, 2016. This would be his second and final career touchdown.

=== Indianapolis Colts ===
Coffman signed with the Colts. On September 4, 2016, he was released. He was re-signed by the Colts on October 18, 2016. He was released on November 1, 2016.

== Personal life ==
His father Paul played tight end for the Green Bay Packers and Kansas City Chiefs from 1978 to 1987. His brother Carson was the starting quarterback for the Kansas State Wildcats. Coffman graduated with a degree in business from the University of Missouri.
