= Peculiar, Missouri =

- City
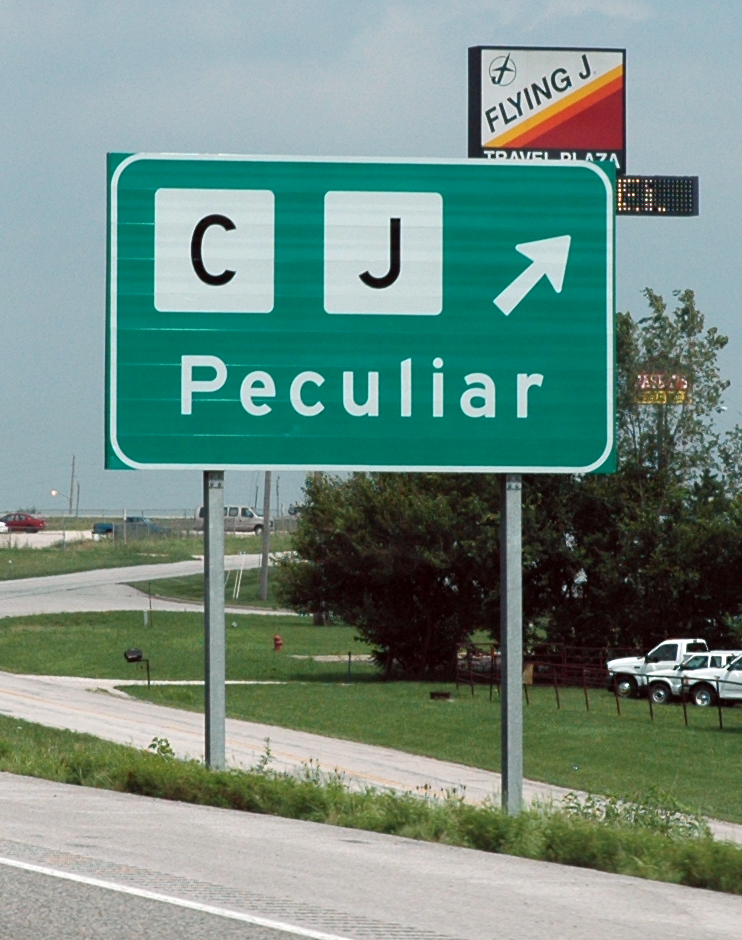
- Sign directing travelers to Peculiar

- Location of Peculiar, Missouri
- Coordinates: 38°43′09″N 94°27′31″W
- Country: United States
- State: Missouri
- County: Cass

Area
  - Total: 9.11 sq mi (23.59 km^{2})
  - Land: 9.07 sq mi (23.48 km^{2})
  - Water: 0.042 sq mi (0.11 km^{2})
- Elevation: 997 ft (304 m)

Population (2020)
  - Total: 5,621
  - Density: 620.1/sq mi (239.41/km^{2})
- Time zone: UTC-6 (Central (CST))
  - Summer (DST): UTC-5 (CDT)
- ZIP code: 64078
- Area codes: 816, 975
- FIPS code: 29-56756
- GNIS feature ID: 2396171
- Website: www.cityofpeculiar.com

Peculiar is a city in Cass County, Missouri and is part of the Kansas City metropolitan area within the United States. The population was 5,621 at the 2020 census. The town motto is "Where the 'odds' are with you."

== History ==
Early settlers of the town came to Western Missouri by riverboat from Illinois, Iowa, Michigan, Pennsylvania, and Ohio. Peculiar also had families coming from Tennessee, Kentucky, and Virginia. On July 29, 1868, the county surveyor, Robert Cass, platted Peculiar and was filed as "The Town of Peculiar".

There are at least two versions of the story on how Peculiar received its name. The first involves the community's first postmaster, Edgar Thomson. His first choice for a town name, "Excelsior," was rejected because it already existed in Atchison County, Missouri. Several other choices were also rejected. The story goes that the annoyed Thomson wrote to the postmaster general himself to complain saying, "We don't care what name you give us so long as it is sort of 'peculiar'." Thomson submitted the name "Peculiar", and the name was approved. The post office was established on June 22, 1868.

In an alternate version, according to Missouri folklorist Margot Ford McMillen, early settlers were searching for a location to farm. As they cleared a small rise and looked below, one remarked, "Well that's peculiar! It's the very place I saw in a vision back in Connecticut." The land was purchased and eventually a village sprang up on it, which was named "Peculiar". According to Carrie Nation, the person who had the vision in Connecticut was a Spiritualist medium named "Mrs. Hawkins," who purchased the land that became Peculiar from Nation's father around 1860.

Peculiar incorporated as a village in the 1890s and became a fourth class city of the state of Missouri in 1953.

The city celebrated its centenary in July 1968. The celebrations continued for nine days and included an antique show and sale, a Lions Club championship rodeo, and an open class Western horse show.

In 2024, the city blocked the Harper Road Technology Park, a proposed $1.5 billion, 504-acre data center project by Diode Ventures, after pushback from local residents. In June 2026, mayor John Shatto explained the debate over the data center created more community engagement with local government. "That was our turning point," he said. "The town banded together, stuck together."

== Government ==
Peculiar is governed by a mayor–council government system. The mayor is elected to a two-year term. The town council, called the board of aldermen, is composed of six members. Two members are elected from each of the three wards in the city. One alderman is elected each year for each ward to serve a two-year term.

== Geography ==
Peculiar is located adjacent to Interstate 49/U.S. Route 71 and the Burlington Northern Santa Fe Railway. Old Peculiar lies one mile to the east along the banks of the East Fork East Branch South Grand River.

According to the United States Census Bureau, the city has a total area of 8.45 square miles (21.89 km^{2}), of which 8.41 square miles (21.78 km^{2}) is land and 0.04 square miles (0.10 km^{2}) is water.

== Demographics ==
Historical population
Census	Pop.	Note	%±
1900	104		—
1910	205		97.1%
1920	283		38.0%
1930	227		−19.8%
1940	206		−9.3%
1950	267		29.6%
1960	458		71.5%
1970	705		53.9%
1980	1,571		122.8%
1990	1,777		13.1%
2000	2,604		46.5%
2010	4,608		77.0%
2020	5,621		22.0%
U.S. Decennial Census

=== Racial and ethnic composition ===
Peculiar city, Missouri – racial and ethnic composition Note: the US Census treats Hispanic/Latino as an ethnic category. This table excludes Latinos from the racial categories and assigns them to a separate category. Hispanics/Latinos may be of any race.
Race / ethnicity (NH = Non-Hispanic)	Pop 2000	Pop 2010	Pop 2020	% 2000	% 2010	% 2020
White alone (NH)	2,502	4,286	4,807	96.08%	93.01%	85.52%
Black or African American alone (NH)	6	91	117	0.23%	1.97%	2.08%
Native American or Alaska Native alone (NH)	11	18	33	0.42%	0.39%	0.59%
Asian alone (NH)	9	12	30	0.35%	0.26%	0.53%
Native Hawaiian or Pacific Islander alone (NH)	2	6	3	0.08%	0.13%	0.05%
Other race alone (NH)	0	7	14	0.00%	0.15%	0.25%
Mixed-race or multiracial (NH)	36	63	375	1.38%	1.37%	6.67%
Hispanic or Latino (any race)	38	125	242	1.46%	2.71%	4.31%
Total	2,604	4,608	5,621	100.00%	100.00%	100.00%

=== 2020 census ===
As of the 2020 census, Peculiar had a population of 5,621. The median age was 35.9 years. 26.0% of residents were under the age of 18 and 12.8% of residents were 65 years of age or older. For every 100 females there were 96.1 males, and for every 100 females age 18 and over there were 91.8 males age 18 and over.

93.1% of residents lived in urban areas, while 6.9% lived in rural areas.

There were 2,138 households in Peculiar, of which 38.7% had children under the age of 18 living in them. Of all households, 53.7% were married-couple households, 13.5% were households with a male householder and no spouse or partner present, and 24.8% were households with a female householder and no spouse or partner present. About 22.7% of all households were made up of individuals and 10.0% had someone living alone who was 65 years of age or older.

There were 2,226 housing units, of which 4.0% were vacant. The homeowner vacancy rate was 1.4% and the rental vacancy rate was 4.1%.

Racial composition as of the 2020 census
Race	Number	Percent
White	4,884	86.9%
Black or African American	121	2.2%
American Indian and Alaska Native	36	0.6%
Asian	30	0.5%
Native Hawaiian and Other Pacific Islander	3	0.1%
Some other race	63	1.1%
Two or more races	484	8.6%

=== 2010 census ===
As of the census of 2010, there were 4,608 people, 1,704 households, and 1,268 families living in the city. The population density was 547.9 inhabitants per square mile (211.5/km^{2}). There were 1,816 housing units at an average density of 215.9 per square mile (83.4/km^{2}). The racial makeup of the city was 94.9% White, 2.0% African American, 0.4% Native American, 0.3% Asian, 0.1% Pacific Islander, 0.8% from other races, and 1.5% from two or more races. Hispanic or Latino people of any race were 2.7% of the population.

There were 1,704 households, of which 41.5% had children under the age of 18 living with them, 56.6% were married couples living together, 12.7% had a female householder with no husband present, 5.2% had a male householder with no wife present, and 25.6% were non-families. 21.1% of all households were made up of individuals, and 7.3% had someone living alone who was 65 years of age or older. The average household size was 2.70 and the average family size was 3.12.

The median age in the city was 32.8 years. 29.1% of residents were under the age of 18; 8.2% were between the ages of 18 and 24; 29.9% were from 25 to 44; 22.9% were from 45 to 64; and 10% were 65 years of age or older. The gender makeup of the city was 49.1% male and 50.9% female.

=== 2000 census ===
As of the census of 2000, there were 2,604 people, 953 households, and 730 families living in the city. The population density was 744.8 inhabitants per square mile (287.6/km^{2}). There were 983 housing units at an average density of 281.2 per square mile (108.6/km^{2}). The racial makeup of the city was 97.20% White, 0.27% African American, 0.42% Native American, 0.35% Asian, 0.08% Pacific Islander, 0.19% from other races, and 1.50% from two or more races. Hispanic or Latino people of any race were 1.46% of the population.

There were 953 households, out of which 42.6% had children under the age of 18 living with them, 60.7% were married couples living together, 13.1% had a female householder with no husband present, and 23.3% were non-families. 19.7% of all households were made up of individuals, and 8.6% had someone living alone who was 65 years of age or older. The average household size was 2.73 and the average family size was 3.14.

In the city the population was spread out, with 31.8% under the age of 18, 9.0% from 18 to 24, 31.2% from 25 to 44, 18.7% from 45 to 64, and 9.3% who were 65 years of age or older. The median age was 31 years. For every 100 females, there were 93.9 males. For every 100 females age 18 and over, there were 89.0 males.

The median income for a household in the city was $44,769, and the median income for a family was $48,534. Males had a median income of $36,921 versus $27,885 for females. The per capita income for the city was $19,104. About 5.7% of families and 7.5% of the population were below the poverty line, including 9.4% of those under age 18 and 11.7% of those age 65 or over.

== Education ==
Public education in Peculiar is administered by Raymore-Peculiar R-II School District. This is true for the entire municipality.

Peculiar has a public library, the Peculiar Branch library.

Metropolitan Community College has the Raymore-Peculiar school district area in its service area, but not its in-district taxation area.

== Media ==
=== Music ===
In 2022, folksinger Willi Carlisle created an album titled Peculiar, Missouri; referring to the town.

=== Literature ===
The Jim Butcher short story from within The Dresden Files universe, "AAAA Wizardry," takes place in Peculiar. The story was initially published in The Dresden Files Role-playing Game Volume 2: Our World in 2010, and was re-published in the 2018 Dresden Files short story collection Brief Cases.

== Notable people ==
- Pete Brewster, football end, coach, and collegiate football and basketball player
- Carson Coffman, AFL player for the Spokane Shock
- Chase Coffman, NFL tight end for the Indianapolis Colts
- Paul Coffman, NFL player for the Minnesota Vikings
- Brutus Hamilton, decathlete and track and field coach
- Tonya Knight, bodybuilder
- Austin Petersen, writer, political activist, commentator, and broadcaster
