= Carson Coffman =

American gridiron football player (born 1988)

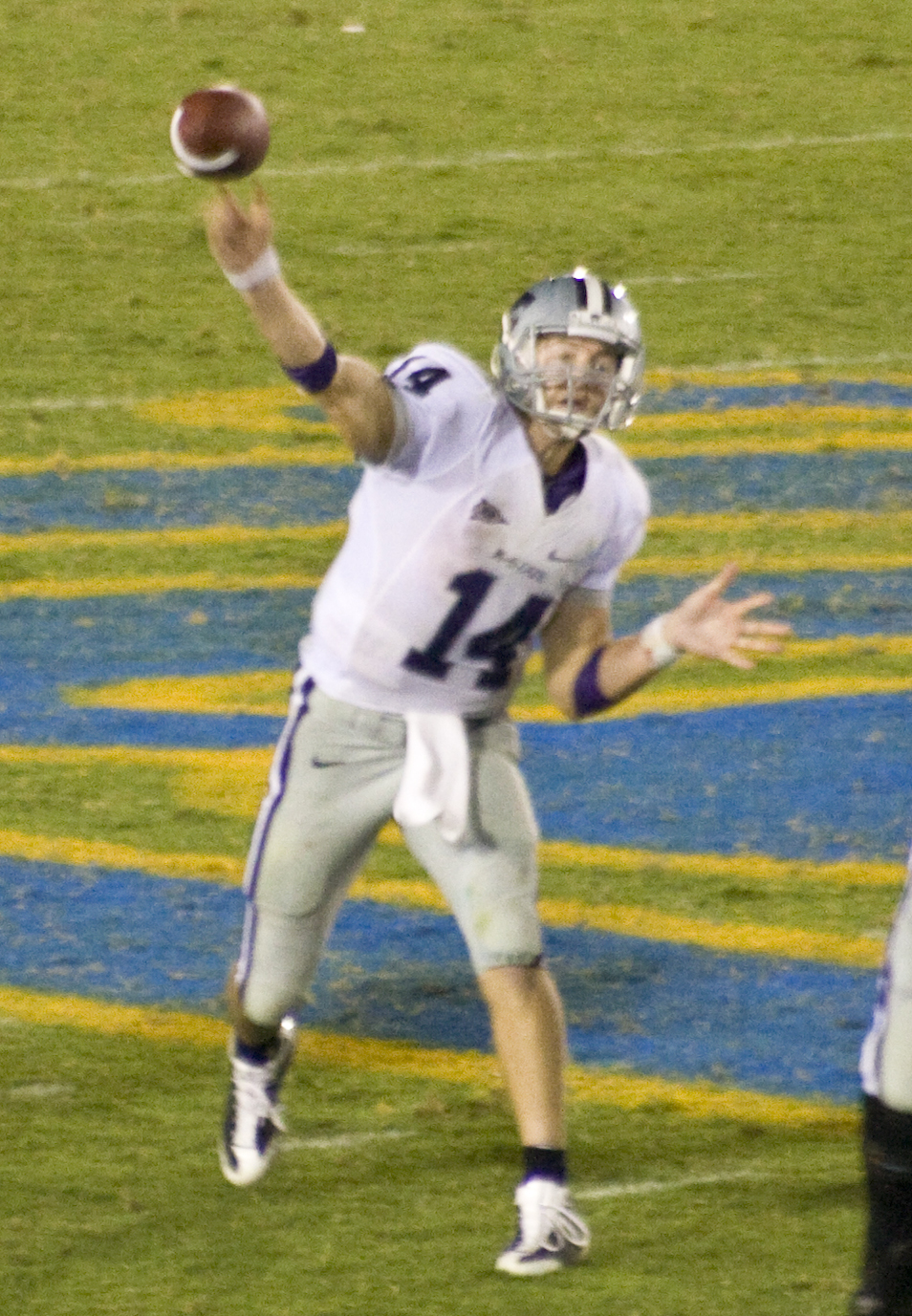
- Coffman with the Kansas State Wildcats in 2009

No. 2, 22
- Position: Quarterback

Personal information
- Born: April 29, 1988 (age 38); Peculiar, Missouri, U.S.
- Listed height: 6 ft 3 in (1.91 m)
- Listed weight: 212 lb (96 kg)

Career information
- High school: Raymore-Peculiar (MO)
- College: Kansas State
- NFL draft: 2011: undrafted

Career history
- Utah Blaze (2012); Kansas City Renegades (2013)*; Chicago Rush (2013); Iowa Barnstormers (2014); Boston Brawlers (2014); Spokane Shock (2015)
- * Offseason or practice squad member only

Career AFL statistics
- Comp. / Att.: 617 / 1,048
- Passing yards: 7,929
- TD–INT: 153–38
- Passer rating: 104.06
- Rushing touchdowns: 15
- Stats at ArenaFan.com

Carson Coffman (born April 29, 1988) is an American former professional football quarterback. Coffman was the starting quarterback for the Kansas State Wildcats in 2009 and 2010. He took over the starting position after the departure of Josh Freeman, and again after the departure of Grant Gregory. He is the brother of Cameron Coffman, a 2011 high school quarterback prospect and Chase Coffman, former Missouri standout who formerly played tight end for the Seattle Seahawks and several other NFL teams. Carson is also the son of former Kansas State standout and NFL tight end Paul Coffman.

== College career ==
Coffman redshirted the 2006 season.

In 2009, Coffman assumed the role of starting quarterback after Josh Freeman left one year early for the NFL draft. Coffman struggled early in the 2009 season and eventually lost his starting role to Grant Gregory. He ended the season with 863 passing yards, 2 touchdowns and 4 interceptions (QB rating of 121.4). Though he was not the starting quarterback, he was still respected by his teammates and voted a team captain and player representative.

In 2010, Coffman once again took over the role of starting quarterback after Grant Gregory exhausted his eligibility. He beat out competition from Collin Klein and Sammy Lammur. For the second year in a row, he had a tremendous Spring Game, and was voted as a team captain and player representative for the second consecutive season. Coffman threw for 2,060 yards with 14 touchdowns compared to only 7 interceptions (quarterback rating of 143.1). Scout.com also ranked him as the #359 quarterback available in the 2011 NFL draft. Coffman will be remembered for his effort in the 2011 Sunflower Showdown where he had a quarterback rating of 231.6, leading the Wildcats to a 59–7 victory against the Kansas Jayhawks. He also led the team to the 2010 Pinstripe Bowl.

== Professional career ==
Coffman was rated the 26th best quarterback in the 2011 NFL draft by NFLDraftScout.com.

Pre-draft measurables
Height	Weight	40-yard dash	10-yard split	20-yard split	20-yard shuttle	Three-cone drill	Vertical jump	Broad jump
6 ft 2 in (1.88 m)	215 lb (98 kg)	4.73 s	1.63 s	2.74 s	4.32 s	7.12 s	29 1/2 in (0.75 m)	9 ft 5 in (2.87 m)
All values from Kansas State Pro Day

For the 2012 season, Coffman served as the backup quarterback for the Utah Blaze of the Arena Football League (AFL), serving as the backup behind league MVP Tommy Grady. Coffman completed 3 of 10 passes for 29 yards, no touchdowns, and one interception.

For the 2013 season, Coffman signed with the Kansas City Renegades of the Champions Professional Indoor Football League.

Coffman signed with the AFL's Chicago Rush for the 2013 season.

On September 10, 2013, Coffman was acquired in a dispersal draft by the Iowa Barnstormers. The Barnstormers traded J. J. Raterink to the Los Angeles Kiss to move up in the draft to acquire Coffman.

On January 6, 2015, Coffman was assigned to the Spokane Shock of the AFL. With former Shock quarterback Erik Meyer leaving for the San Jose SaberCats, Coffman had to battle, and eventually beat Warren Smith, for the Shock's starting quarterback position.

== Career statistics ==
=== AFL ===
Year	Team	Passing							Rushing		
Year	Team	Cmp	Att	Pct	Yds	TD	Int	Rtg	Att	Yds	TD
2012	Utah	3	10	30.0	29	0	1	0.00	1	1	0
2013	Chicago	283	467	60.6	3,583	73	17	108.46	25	56	9
2014	Iowa	236	402	58.7	2,970	53	15	99.20	16	56	5
2015	Spokane	95	169	56.2	1,347	27	5	109.39	3	8	1
Career		617	1,048	58.9	7,929	153	38	104.06	45	121	15

=== College ===
Kansas State Wildcats
Season	Passing							Rushing			
Season	Comp	Att	Yards	Pct.	TD	Int	QB rating	Att	Yards	Avg	TD
2007	3	5	22	60.0	0	0	97.0	2	-3	-1.5	0
2008	25	41	282	61.0	1	2	117.0	15	60	4.0	1
2009	71	117	860	60.7	2	4	121.2	54	64	1.2	2
2010	171	263	2,060	65.0	14	7	143.1	110	157	1.4	9
Career	270	426	3,224	63.4	17	13	134.0	181	278	1.5	12
