= Lee's Summit West High School =

Location
- 2600 SW Ward Road; Lee's Summit, Missouri 64082; United States; 38°52′24″N 94°23′56″W

Information
- Type: Public secondary
- Established: 2004
- School district: Lee's Summit R-VII School District
- NCES District ID: 2918300
- Principal: Dr Kayla Maid
- Teaching staff: 120.96 (on an FTE basis)
- Grades: 9–12
- Enrollment: 1,976 (2023-2024)
- Student to teacher ratio: 16.34
- Colors: Navy and silver
- Nickname: Titans
- Accreditation: Blue Ribbon 2013.
- Website: lswhs.lsr7.org

Lee's Summit West High School is located at 2600 Southwest Ward Road in Lee's Summit, Missouri, United States. It opened in the fall of 2004 and is part of the Lee's Summit R-VII School District. Current enrollment is approximately 2000 students. The mascot of the school is the Titan. The school newspaper is the Titan Scroll, which is a member of the High School National Ad Network. After a $32 million bond passed in April 2006, the high school received facility improvements and an expansion which was completed in 2009.

== Athletics ==
Lee's Summit West is a part of the Greater Kansas City Suburban Gold Conference. Their rivals are Lee's Summit and Lee's Summit North. The following Missouri State High School Activities Association sports are offered:

- Baseball (boys)
- Basketball (boys & girls)
- Cross country (boys & girls)
  - Boys state champions – 2008
  - Girls state champions – 2007, 2008, 2009, 2010, 2011
- Football (boys)
  - State champions – 2007, 2010, 2013
- Golf (boys & girls)
- Lacrosse (boys and girls) (not MSHSAA sponsored)
- Soccer (boys & girls)
  - Girls state champions – 2005, 2006
- Softball (girls)
- Swimming (boys & girls)
- Tennis (boys & girls)
- Track and field (boys & girls)
  - Girls state champions – 2006, 2010, 2016, 2017, 2018, 2019,
- Volleyball (boys & girls)
  - State champions – 2007
- Wrestling (boys and girls)

== Notable alumni ==
- Trevor Rosenthal (2008), MLB All-Star pitcher
- Michael Dixon (2009), basketball player who plays in Egypt
- Matt Hall (2011), MLB pitcher
- Evan Boehm (2012), NFL center
- Shaquille Harrison (2012), NBA player
- Monte Harrison (2014), wide receiver for the Arkansas Razorbacks and former MLB outfielder
- Alex Lange (2014), pitcher for the Detroit Tigers
- Vanessa Merrell (2015) YouTuber
- Veronica Merrell (2015), YouTuber
- Elijah Childs (2017), basketball player in the Israeli Basketball Premier League
- Yor Anei (2018), NBA G League basketball player
- Phillip Brooks (2018), NFL wide receiver
- Mario Goodrich (2018), NFL cornerback
