= Raymore, Missouri =

City of Raymore, Missouri
- City
- Nickname: Come home to more
- Location in the state of Missouri
- Coordinates: 38°48′11″N 94°27′30″W
- Country: United States
- State: Missouri
- County: Cass
- Founded: 1872
- Incorporated: 1872

Government
  - Mayor: Kris Turnbow
  - City Council: Ward 1 Donald Baker; Josh McDonald Ward 2 Joseph Burke III; Thomas Circo* Ward 3 Jay Holman; Kevin Barber Ward 4 Tome Engert; Jeremy R. Roe *mayor pro tempore

Area
  - Total: 17.65 sq mi (45.72 km^{2})
  - Land: 17.31 sq mi (44.84 km^{2})
  - Water: 0.34 sq mi (0.88 km^{2})
- Elevation: 1,109 ft (338 m)

Population (2020)
  - Total: 22,941
  - Density: 1,325.1/sq mi (511.64/km^{2})
- Time zone: UTC-6 (CST)
  - Summer (DST): UTC-5 (CDT)
- ZIP code: 64083
- Area codes: 816, 975
- FIPS code: 29-60752
- GNIS feature ID: 2396328
- Website: www.raymore.com

Raymore is a city in Cass County, Missouri, United States, within the Kansas City Metropolitan Area. Population estimates recently released by the US Census show that from July 2022 to July 2023, Raymore was the fastest growing city in the state and the 66th fastest growing city in the country, with a 4.7% increase in population in one year. Raymore's population estimate is 25,306 as of July 2024. The population was 22,941 at the 2020 census.

== History ==
Raymore was platted in 1872 and incorporated on March 20, 1877. The name Raymore is an amalgamation of the surnames of two railroad men, George Rea and Henry Moore. The Raymore post office has been in operation since 1872.

The Watkins Family Farm Historic District was listed on the National Register of Historic Places in 2007.

== Government ==
The City of Raymore follows a City Council-Manager style of government. The mayor is Kristofer P. Turnbow. On September 9, 2014, Jim Feuerborn was administered his oath of office to serve as Raymore's City Manager (after previously serving as the city's Acting City Manager since June, and the city's Assistant City Manager prior to that). The Raymore City Hall is located at 100 Municipal Circle, just south of Missouri Route 58.

== Geography ==
According to the United States Census Bureau, the city has a total area of 17.75 square miles (45.97 km^{2}), of which 17.58 square miles (45.53 km^{2}) is land and 0.17 square miles (0.44 km^{2}) is water.

== Demographics ==
Historical population
Census	Pop.	Note	%±
1880	83		—
1900	271		—
1910	218		−19.6%
1920	182		−16.5%
1930	222		22.0%
1940	207		−6.8%
1950	208		0.5%
1960	268		28.8%
1970	587		119.0%
1980	3,154		437.3%
1990	5,592		77.3%
2000	11,146		99.3%
2010	19,206		72.3%
2020	22,941		19.4%
U.S. Decennial Census

=== Racial and ethnic composition ===
Raymore city, Missouri – Racial and ethnic composition Note: the US Census treats Hispanic/Latino as an ethnic category. This table excludes Latinos from the racial categories and assigns them to a separate category. Hispanics/Latinos may be of any race.
Race / Ethnicity (NH = Non-Hispanic)	Pop 2000	Pop 2010	Pop 2020	% 2000	% 2010	% 2020
White alone (NH)	10,453	16,426	17,765	93.78%	85.53%	77.44%
Black or African American alone (NH)	205	1,492	2,298	1.84%	7.77%	10.02%
Native American or Alaska Native alone (NH)	50	74	98	0.45%	0.39%	0.43%
Asian alone (NH)	74	160	271	0.66%	0.83%	1.18%
Native Hawaiian or Pacific Islander alone (NH)	5	10	7	0.04%	0.05%	0.03%
Other race alone (NH)	1	14	133	0.01%	0.07%	0.58%
Mixed race or Multiracial (NH)	132	406	1,222	1.18%	2.11%	5.33%
Hispanic or Latino (any race)	226	624	1,147	2.03%	3.25%	5.00%
Total	11,146	19,206	22,941	100.00%	100.00%	100.00%

=== 2020 census ===
As of the 2020 census, Raymore had a population of 22,941 and 8,443 households; 6,202 were families. The population density was 1,325.3 per square mile (511.6/km^{2}). There were 8,844 housing units, of which 4.5% were vacant; the homeowner vacancy rate was 1.1% and the rental vacancy rate was 9.9%. 96.9% of residents lived in urban areas, while 3.1% lived in rural areas. The median age was 40.1 years. 25.5% of residents were under the age of 18 and 17.9% of residents were 65 years of age or older. For every 100 females there were 91.7 males, and for every 100 females age 18 and over there were 87.3 males age 18 and over. Of the 8,443 households, 36.0% had children under the age of 18 living in them. Of all households, 60.1% were married-couple households, 11.7% were households with a male householder and no spouse or partner present, and 23.3% were households with a female householder and no spouse or partner present. About 21.4% of all households were made up of individuals and 11.2% had someone living alone who was 65 years of age or older. The average household size was 2.5 and the average family size was 3.0.

Racial composition as of the 2020 census
Race	Number	Percent
White	18,111	78.9%
Black or African American	2,339	10.2%
American Indian and Alaska Native	116	0.5%
Asian	277	1.2%
Native Hawaiian and Other Pacific Islander	21	0.1%
Some other race	355	1.5%
Two or more races	1,722	7.5%

=== Income ===
The 2016–2020 5-year American Community Survey estimates show that the median household income was $86,368 (with a margin of error of +/- $7,901) and the median family income was $99,853 (+/- $4,306). Males had a median income of $52,880 (+/- $6,952) versus $41,750 (+/- $4,113) for females. The median income for those above 16 years old was $45,620 (+/- $3,115). Approximately, 4.1% of families and 5.5% of the population were below the poverty line, including 6.9% of those under the age of 18 and 6.3% of those ages 65 or over.

== Economy ==
=== Largest employers ===
As of July 2025, the largest employers in the city are:

#	Employer	# of Employees
1	Nuuly	1,030
2	Walmart	405
3	Raymore-Peculiar School District	344
4	Foxwood Springs	274
5	Compass Health Network	218
6	Cosentino's Price Chopper	152
7	Southern Glazer's Wine & Spirits	150
8	Sam's Club	150
9	Lowe's	136
10	City of Raymore	108

== Education ==
Public education in Raymore is administered by Raymore-Peculiar R-II School District. This is true for the entire municipality.

Metropolitan Community College has the Raymore-Peculiar school district area in its service area, but not its in-district taxation area.
