= 2002 Kentucky Wildcats football team =

American college football season

2002 Kentucky Wildcats football
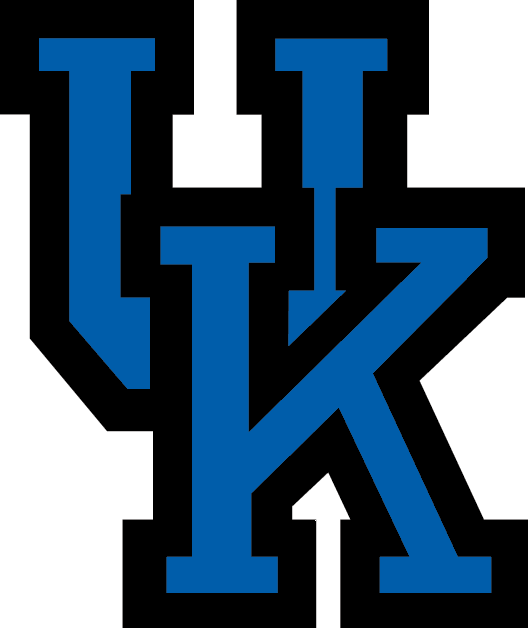
- Conference: Southeastern Conference
- Eastern Division
- Record: 7–5 (3–5 SEC)
- Head coach: Guy Morriss (2nd season)
- Offensive coordinator: Brent Pease (2nd season)
- Offensive scheme: Pro set
- Defensive coordinator: John Goodner (2nd season)
- Base defense: 4–2–5/4–4–3
- Home stadium: Commonwealth Stadium

2002 Southeastern Conference football standings
| | Conf. | | | Overall |
| Team | W | | L | W | | L |
|---|---|---|---|---|---|---|
Eastern Division
| No. 3 Georgia x$ | 7 | – | 1 | 13 | – | 1 |
| Florida | 6 | – | 2 | 8 | – | 5 |
| Tennessee | 5 | – | 3 | 8 | – | 5 |
| Kentucky | 3 | – | 5 | 7 | – | 5 |
| South Carolina | 3 | – | 5 | 5 | – | 7 |
| Vanderbilt | 0 | – | 8 | 2 | – | 10 |
Western Division
| Arkansas xy | 5 | – | 3 | 9 | – | 5 |
| No. 14 Auburn x | 5 | – | 3 | 9 | – | 4 |
| LSU x | 5 | – | 3 | 8 | – | 5 |
| Ole Miss | 3 | – | 5 | 7 | – | 6 |
| Mississippi State | 0 | – | 8 | 3 | – | 9 |
| No. 11 ^Alabama | 6 | – | 2 | 10 | – | 3 |
Championship: Georgia 30, Arkansas 3
$ – BCS representative as conference champion; x – Division champion/co-champions; y – Championship game participant; ^ – Alabama had the best division record, but did not participate in postseason play due to NCAA probation.; Rankings from AP Poll

The 2002 Kentucky Wildcats football team represented the University of Kentucky in the 2002 NCAA Division I-A football season. The team was led by second-year head coach Guy Morriss and played home games at Commonwealth Stadium in Lexington, Kentucky. The Wildcats scored 385 points while allowing 301 points.

Though finishing with a 7–5 record, the Wildcats were not bowl eligible due to NCAA sanctions resulting from the tenure of former head coach Hal Mumme.

Kentucky opened with a 22–17 win at no. 17 Louisville, a nationally broadcast upset at Papa John's Cardinal Stadium in which Kentucky reclaimed the Governor's Cup. A 77–17 win over UTEP followed (the second-largest point total in school history at the time), and wins against Indiana and Middle Tennessee State put Kentucky at 4–0. A 41–34 loss at no. 7 Florida was followed by a 16–12 loss to South Carolina that came down to the final play. A 29–17 win at Arkansas followed. A 52–24 loss to no. 5 Georgia was followed by a 45–24 win at Mississippi State. A 33–30 loss to no. 16 LSU on the game's final play was followed by a 41–21 win against Vanderbilt and a 24–0 loss at Tennessee.

Morriss resigned following the season to accept the head coaching position at Baylor.

== Schedule ==
| Date | Time | Opponent | Site | TV | Result | Attendance |
|---|---|---|---|---|---|---|
| September 1 | 6:00 pm | at No. 17 Louisville* | Papa John's Cardinal Stadium; Louisville, Kentucky (Battle for the Governor's Cup) | ESPN2 | W 22–17 | 42,660 |
| September 7 | 1:30 pm | UTEP* | Commonwealth Stadium; Lexington, Kentucky | | W 77–17 | 59,213 |
| September 14 | 6:00 pm | Indiana* | Commonwealth Stadium; Lexington, Kentucky (rivalry) | | W 27–17 | 70,347 |
| September 21 | 1:30 pm | Middle Tennessee* | Commonwealth Stadium; Lexington, Kentucky | | W 44–22 | 60,584 |
| September 28 | 3:30 pm | at No. 7 Florida | Ben Hill Griffin Stadium; Gainesville, Florida (rivalry) | CBS | L 34–41 | 85,333 |
| October 12 | 6:30 pm | South Carolina | Commonwealth Stadium; Lexington, Kentucky | ESPN2 | L 12–16 | 70,547 |
| October 19 | 3:00 pm | at Arkansas | Donald W. Reynolds Razorback Stadium; Fayetteville, Arkansas | | W 29–17 | 61,573 |
| October 26 | 3:30 pm | No. 5 Georgia | Commonwealth Stadium; Lexington, Kentucky | CBS | L 24–52 | 71,017 |
| November 2 | 2:30 pm | at Mississippi State | Davis Wade Stadium; Starkville, Mississippi | PPV | W 45–24 | 45,248 |
| November 9 | 12:30 pm | No. 16 LSU | Commonwealth Stadium; Lexington, Kentucky | JPS | L 30–33 | 66,262 |
| November 16 | 1:30 pm | Vanderbilt | Commonwealth Stadium; Lexington, Kentucky (rivalry) | | W 41–21 | 51,114 |
| November 30 | 12:30 pm | at Tennessee | Neyland Stadium; Knoxville, Tennessee (Battle for the Barrel) | JPS | L 0–24 | 105,462 |
*Non-conference game; Rankings from AP Poll released prior to the game; All times are in Eastern time

== Game summaries ==
=== At No. 17 Louisville ===
| | 1 | 2 | 3 | 4 | Total |
|---|---|---|---|---|---|
| Wildcats | 10 | 6 | 3 | 3 | 22 |
| No. 17 Cardinals | 0 | 7 | 10 | 0 | 17 |

| Statistics | UK | LOU |
|---|---|---|
| First downs | 14 | 16 |
| Total yards | 273 | 248 |
| Rushing yards | 78 | 55 |
| Passing yards | 195 | 193 |
| Passing: comp–att–int | 13–27–0 | 14–39–1 |
| Turnovers | 0 | 3 |

| Team | Category | Player | Statistics |
|---|---|---|---|
| Kentucky | Passing | Jared Lorenzen | 13/27, 195 yards, TD |
| Kentucky | Rushing | Artose Pinner | 28 rushes, 87 yards, TD |
| Kentucky | Receiving | Ernest Simms | 2 receptions, 69 yards, TD |
| Louisville | Passing | Dave Ragone | 14/39, 193 yards, TD, INT |
| Louisville | Rushing | Dave Ragone | 13 rushes, 47 yards |
| Louisville | Receiving | Damien Dorsey | 3 receptions, 91 yards |

=== UTEP ===
| | 1 | 2 | 3 | 4 | Total |
|---|---|---|---|---|---|
| Miners | 3 | 7 | 0 | 7 | 17 |
| Wildcats | 14 | 21 | 28 | 14 | 77 |

| Statistics | UTEP | UK |
|---|---|---|
| First downs | 19 | 27 |
| Total yards | 371 | 591 |
| Rushing yards | 220 | 364 |
| Passing yards | 151 | 227 |
| Passing: comp–att–int | 12–26–0 | 12–19–0 |
| Turnovers | 2 | 1 |

| Team | Category | Player | Statistics |
|---|---|---|---|
| UTEP | Passing | Jon Schaper | 10/24, 118 yards, TD |
| UTEP | Rushing | Matt Austin | 14 rushes, 112 yards |
| UTEP | Receiving | Terrance Minor | 3 receptions, 69 yards, TD |
| Kentucky | Passing | Jared Lorenzen | 10/17, 211 yards, 5 TD |
| Kentucky | Rushing | Artose Pinner | 16 rushes, 116 yards, TD |
| Kentucky | Receiving | Derek Abney | 3 receptions, 80 yards, TD |

=== Indiana ===
| | 1 | 2 | 3 | 4 | Total |
|---|---|---|---|---|---|
| Hoosiers | 0 | 3 | 14 | 0 | 17 |
| Wildcats | 14 | 0 | 0 | 13 | 27 |

| Statistics | IU | UK |
|---|---|---|
| First downs | 21 | 17 |
| Total yards | 394 | 327 |
| Rushing yards | 160 | 144 |
| Passing yards | 234 | 183 |
| Passing: comp–att–int | 13–38–2 | 19–32–1 |
| Turnovers | 3 | 1 |

| Team | Category | Player | Statistics |
|---|---|---|---|
| Indiana | Passing | Gibran Hamdan | 13/38, 234 yards, TD, 2 INT |
| Indiana | Rushing | Yamar Washington | 32 rushes, 163 yards |
| Indiana | Receiving | Courtney Roby | 5 receptions, 101 yards |
| Kentucky | Passing | Jared Lorenzen | 19/32, 183 yards, 3 TD, INT |
| Kentucky | Rushing | Artose Pinner | 25 rushes, 141 yards |
| Kentucky | Receiving | Artose Pinner | 10 receptions, 92 yards, TD |

=== Middle Tennessee ===
| | 1 | 2 | 3 | 4 | Total |
|---|---|---|---|---|---|
| Blue Raiders | 0 | 16 | 6 | 0 | 22 |
| Wildcats | 17 | 7 | 13 | 7 | 44 |

| Statistics | MTSU | UK |
|---|---|---|
| First downs | 18 | 26 |
| Total yards | 422 | 510 |
| Rushing yards | 220 | 205 |
| Passing yards | 202 | 305 |
| Passing: comp–att–int | 10–19–0 | 22–31–1 |
| Turnovers | 2 | 1 |

| Team | Category | Player | Statistics |
|---|---|---|---|
| Middle Tennessee | Passing | Andrico Hines | 10/19, 202 yards, TD |
| Middle Tennessee | Rushing | Dwone Hicks | 16 rushes, 97 yards, 2 TD |
| Middle Tennessee | Receiving | David Youell | 5 receptions, 83 yards |
| Kentucky | Passing | Jared Lorenzen | 22/31, 305 yards, 3 TD, INT |
| Kentucky | Rushing | Artose Pinner | 24 rushes, 163 yards, 3 TD |
| Kentucky | Receiving | Aaron Boone | 6 receptions, 111 yards, TD |

=== At No. 7 Florida ===
| | 1 | 2 | 3 | 4 | Total |
|---|---|---|---|---|---|
| Wildcats | 0 | 0 | 28 | 6 | 34 |
| No. 7 Gators | 6 | 13 | 13 | 9 | 41 |

| Statistics | UK | FLA |
|---|---|---|
| First downs | 14 | 30 |
| Total yards | 268 | 509 |
| Rushing yards | 88 | 134 |
| Passing yards | 180 | 375 |
| Passing: comp–att–int | 20–32–1 | 28–43–0 |
| Turnovers | 2 | 1 |

| Team | Category | Player | Statistics |
|---|---|---|---|
| Kentucky | Passing | Jared Lorenzen | 20/32, 180 yards, 2 TD, INT |
| Kentucky | Rushing | Artose Pinner | 20 rushes, 90 yards, TD |
| Kentucky | Receiving | Aaron Boone | 2 receptions, 40 yards |
| Florida | Passing | Rex Grossman | 28/43, 375 yards, 2 TD |
| Florida | Rushing | Earnest Graham | 32 rushes, 102 yards, TD |
| Florida | Receiving | Taylor Jacobs | 12 receptions, 183 yards, 2 TD |

=== South Carolina ===
| | 1 | 2 | 3 | 4 | Total |
|---|---|---|---|---|---|
| Gamecocks | 0 | 0 | 3 | 13 | 16 |
| Wildcats | 0 | 10 | 0 | 2 | 12 |

| Statistics | SCAR | UK |
|---|---|---|
| First downs | 14 | 17 |
| Total yards | 350 | 327 |
| Rushing yards | 138 | 118 |
| Passing yards | 212 | 209 |
| Passing: comp–att–int | 10–18–1 | 23–39–1 |
| Turnovers | 1 | 3 |

| Team | Category | Player | Statistics |
|---|---|---|---|
| South Carolina | Passing | Corey Jenkins | 7/15, 199 yards, INT |
| South Carolina | Rushing | Andrew Pinnock | 8 rushes, 61 yards |
| South Carolina | Receiving | Troy Williamson | 3 receptions, 101 yards |
| Kentucky | Passing | Jared Lorenzen | 22/36, 194 yards, TD |
| Kentucky | Rushing | Artose Pinner | 25 rushes, 117 yards |
| Kentucky | Receiving | Aaron Boone | 4 receptions, 72 yards |

=== At Arkansas ===
| | 1 | 2 | 3 | 4 | Total |
|---|---|---|---|---|---|
| Wildcats | 3 | 6 | 20 | 0 | 29 |
| Razorbacks | 7 | 3 | 7 | 0 | 17 |

| Statistics | UK | ARK |
|---|---|---|
| First downs | 18 | 26 |
| Total yards | 332 | 515 |
| Rushing yards | 79 | 293 |
| Passing yards | 253 | 222 |
| Passing: comp–att–int | 19–31–0 | 17–30–1 |
| Turnovers | 2 | 2 |

| Team | Category | Player | Statistics |
|---|---|---|---|
| Kentucky | Passing | Jared Lorenzen | 19/31, 253 yards, 2 TD |
| Kentucky | Rushing | Artose Pinner | 26 rushes, 67 yards, TD |
| Kentucky | Receiving | Aaron Boone | 7 receptions, 102 yards, TD |
| Arkansas | Passing | Matt Jones | 15/25, 210 yards, INT |
| Arkansas | Rushing | Fred Talley | 24 rushes, 182 yards |
| Arkansas | Receiving | George Wilson | 6 receptions, 82 yards |

=== No. 5 Georgia ===
| | 1 | 2 | 3 | 4 | Total |
|---|---|---|---|---|---|
| No. 5 Bulldogs | 14 | 7 | 21 | 10 | 52 |
| Wildcats | 17 | 7 | 0 | 0 | 24 |

| Statistics | UGA | UK |
|---|---|---|
| First downs | 33 | 19 |
| Total yards | 529 | 372 |
| Rushing yards | 172 | 130 |
| Passing yards | 357 | 242 |
| Passing: comp–att–int | 27–47–1 | 15–31–0 |
| Turnovers | 1 | 0 |

| Team | Category | Player | Statistics |
|---|---|---|---|
| Georgia | Passing | David Greene | 16/32, 251 yards, 4 TD |
| Georgia | Rushing | Tony Milton | 18 rushes, 78 yards |
| Georgia | Receiving | Terrence Edwards | 5 receptions, 127 yards, 3 TD |
| Kentucky | Passing | Jared Lorenzen | 13/27, 208 yards, 2 TD |
| Kentucky | Rushing | Artose Pinner | 19 rushes, 111 yards, TD |
| Kentucky | Receiving | Derek Abney | 4 receptions, 99 yards, TD |

=== At Mississippi State ===
| | 1 | 2 | 3 | 4 | Total |
|---|---|---|---|---|---|
| Wildcats | 10 | 6 | 21 | 8 | 45 |
| Bulldogs | 0 | 17 | 0 | 7 | 24 |

| Statistics | UK | MSST |
|---|---|---|
| First downs | 14 | 17 |
| Total yards | 266 | 392 |
| Rushing yards | 105 | 230 |
| Passing yards | 161 | 162 |
| Passing: comp–att–int | 12–26–0 | 9–34–4 |
| Turnovers | 0 | 5 |

| Team | Category | Player | Statistics |
|---|---|---|---|
| Kentucky | Passing | Jared Lorenzen | 10/22, 141 yards, TD |
| Kentucky | Rushing | Artose Pinner | 31 rushes, 104 yards, TD |
| Kentucky | Receiving | Tommy Cook | 2 receptions, 48 yards |
| Mississippi State | Passing | Kevin Fant | 9/30, 162 yards, 3 TD, 3 INT |
| Mississippi State | Rushing | Jerious Norwood | 15 rushes, 138 yards |
| Mississippi State | Receiving | Terrell Grindle | 3 receptions, 108 yards, 2 TD |

=== No. 16 LSU ===
| | 1 | 2 | 3 | 4 | Total |
|---|---|---|---|---|---|
| No. 16 Tigers | 0 | 14 | 7 | 12 | 33 |
| Wildcats | 7 | 0 | 7 | 16 | 30 |

| Statistics | LSU | UK |
|---|---|---|
| First downs | 18 | 21 |
| Total yards | 477 | 375 |
| Rushing yards | 213 | 154 |
| Passing yards | 264 | 221 |
| Passing: comp–att–int | 10–23–0 | 14–29–0 |
| Turnovers | 0 | 2 |

| Team | Category | Player | Statistics |
|---|---|---|---|
| LSU | Passing | Marcus Randall | 10/23, 264 yards, 3 TD |
| LSU | Rushing | Joseph Addai | 9 rushes, 91 yards, TD |
| LSU | Receiving | Devery Henderson | 5 receptions, 201 yards, 3 TD |
| Kentucky | Passing | Jared Lorenzen | 12/26, 210 yards, 4 TD |
| Kentucky | Rushing | Artose Pinner | 27 rushes, 143 yards |
| Kentucky | Receiving | Aaron Boone | 3 receptions, 112 yards, 3 TD |

=== Vanderbilt ===
| | 1 | 2 | 3 | 4 | Total |
|---|---|---|---|---|---|
| Commodores | 7 | 7 | 7 | 0 | 21 |
| Wildcats | 21 | 7 | 0 | 13 | 41 |

| Statistics | VAN | UK |
|---|---|---|
| First downs | 16 | 18 |
| Total yards | 278 | 356 |
| Rushing yards | 102 | 228 |
| Passing yards | 176 | 128 |
| Passing: comp–att–int | 11–26–0 | 14–23–2 |
| Turnovers | 2 | 2 |

| Team | Category | Player | Statistics |
|---|---|---|---|
| Vanderbilt | Passing | Jay Cutler | 11/26, 176 yards, 2 TD |
| Vanderbilt | Rushing | Kwane Doster | 22 rushes, 111 yards |
| Vanderbilt | Receiving | Dan Stricker | 6 receptions, 96 yards, TD |
| Kentucky | Passing | Jared Lorenzen | 14/23, 128 yards, 2 INT |
| Kentucky | Rushing | Artose Pinner | 31 rushes, 224 yards, 4 TD |
| Kentucky | Receiving | Derek Abney | 4 receptions, 31 yards |

=== At Tennessee ===
| | 1 | 2 | 3 | 4 | Total |
|---|---|---|---|---|---|
| Wildcats | 0 | 0 | 0 | 0 | 0 |
| Volunteers | 7 | 14 | 0 | 3 | 24 |

| Statistics | UK | TENN |
|---|---|---|
| First downs | 11 | 21 |
| Total yards | 172 | 330 |
| Rushing yards | 89 | 155 |
| Passing yards | 83 | 175 |
| Passing: comp–att–int | 12–30–0 | 13–26–0 |
| Turnovers | 1 | 0 |

| Team | Category | Player | Statistics |
|---|---|---|---|
| Kentucky | Passing | Jared Lorenzen | 9/23, 59 yards |
| Kentucky | Rushing | Artose Pinner | 11 rushes, 51 yards |
| Kentucky | Receiving | Aaron Boone | 5 receptions, 45 yards |
| Tennessee | Passing | Casey Clausen | 13/26, 175 yards, 2 TD |
| Tennessee | Rushing | Derrick Tinsley | 8 rushes, 48 yards |
| Tennessee | Receiving | Derrick Tinsley | 4 receptions, 72 yards, 2 TD |

== Roster ==
2002 Kentucky Wildcats football team roster
Players
Coaches
Offense

| Pos. | # | Name | Class |
|---|---|---|---|
| WR | 3 | Ernest Simms | Sr |
| WR | 4 | Glenn Holt | Fr |
| RB | 5 | Arliss Beach | Fr |
| QB | 7 | Shane Boyd | So |
| RB | 20 | Artose Pinner | Sr |
| QB | 22 | Jared Lorenzen | Jr |
| G | 65 | Keith Chatelain | Sr |
| G | 66 | Brandon Lesniewski | So |
| G | 67 | Yancey Reynolds | Jr |
| OT | 68 | Will Noble | So |
| G | 70 | Jason Rollins | So |
| OT | 71 | Jared McGowan | Fr |
| C | 72 | Michael Aitcheson | Fr |
| OT | 73 | Antonio Hall | Jr |
| OT | 74 | Jeremy Darveau | Fr |
| G | 75 | Sylvester Miller | Jr |
| G | 76 | Joe Brady | Fr |
| G | 77 | Greg Perdue | Sr |
| C | 78 | Nick Seitze | Jr |
| C | 79 | Daniel Burnett | So |
| WR | 80 | Brian Pickard | Fr |
| WR | 81 | Dominick DeVastey | Fr |
| WR | 82 | Chris Bernard | Jr |
| WR | 83 | Gerad Parker | So |
| TE | 84 | Jeremiah Drobney | Fr |
| WR | 85 | DeMarcus Wood | Fr |
| TE | 86 | Win Gaffron | Jr |
| TE | 87 | Jonny Butler | Sr |
| WR | 88 | Dan Hopewell | So |
| TE | 89 | Kurt Myers | Fr |

Defense

| Pos. | # | Name | Class |
|---|---|---|---|
| DE | 62 | Mike McKinley | Jr |
| DE | 64 | Deion Holts | Fr |
| DT | 68 | Jeremy Caudill | Jr |
| LB | 29 | Robert Willey | So |
| DE | 98 | Vincent Burns | So |
| DT | 99 | Ellery Moore | So |
| FS | 35 | Travis Atwell | So |

Special teams

| Pos. | # | Name | Class |
|---|---|---|---|
| K | 97 | Justin Hutton | Jr |

Head coach

- Guy Morriss

Coordinators/assistant coaches

Legend

- (C) Team captain
- (S) Suspended
- (I) Ineligible
- Injured
- Redshirt

Roster
Last update: 2002-10-10

== Team players in the 2003 NFL draft ==
| Player | Position | Round | Pick | NFL club |
|---|---|---|---|---|
| Dewayne Robertson | Defensive tackle | 1 | 4 | New York Jets |
| Artose Pinner | Running back | 4 | 99 | Detroit Lions |
