= 2002 Arkansas Razorbacks football team =

American college football season

2002 Arkansas Razorbacks football

SEC Western Division co-champion

SEC Championship Game, L 3–30 vs. Georgia

Music City Bowl, L 14–29 vs. Minnesota
- Conference: Southeastern Conference
- Western Division
- Record: 9–5 (5–3 SEC)
- Head coach: Houston Nutt (5th season)
- Offensive scheme: Multiple option
- Defensive coordinator: Dave Wommack (1st season)
- Base defense: 4–3
- Captains: Richie Butler; Chuck Nalley; Sparky Hamilton; Raymond House; Fred Talley; Gavin Walls
- Home stadium: Razorback Stadium; War Memorial Stadium

2002 Southeastern Conference football standings
	Conf.			Overall
Team	W		L	W		L
Eastern Division
No. 3 Georgia x$	7	–	1	13	–	1
Florida	6	–	2	8	–	5
Tennessee	5	–	3	8	–	5
Kentucky	3	–	5	7	–	5
South Carolina	3	–	5	5	–	7
Vanderbilt	0	–	8	2	–	10
Western Division
Arkansas xy	5	–	3	9	–	5
No. 14 Auburn x	5	–	3	9	–	4
LSU x	5	–	3	8	–	5
Ole Miss	3	–	5	7	–	6
Mississippi State	0	–	8	3	–	9
No. 11 ^Alabama	6	–	2	10	–	3
Championship: Georgia 30, Arkansas 3
$ – BCS representative as conference champion; x – Division champion/co-champions; y – Championship game participant; ^ – Alabama had the best division record, but did not participate in postseason play due to NCAA probation.; Rankings from AP Poll

The 2002 Arkansas Razorbacks football team represented the University of Arkansas as a member of the Southeastern Conference (SEC) during the 2002 NCAA Division I-A football season. Led by fifth-year head coach Houston Nutt, the Razorbacks compiled an overall record 9–5 with a mark of 5–3 in conference play, placing in a three-way tie for second in the SEC's Western Division. Because Alabama, which had the best record in the SEC West at 6–2, was ineligible for postseason play, Arkansas shared the division title with the other second-place finishers, Auburn and LSU. The Razorbacks advanced to the SEC Championship Game, which they lost to Georgia. Arkansas was then invited to the Music City Bowl, where the Razorbacks were defeated by Minnesota. The team played home games at Razorback Stadium in Fayetteville, Arkansas and War Memorial Stadium in Little Rock, Arkansas.

== Schedule ==
Date	Time	Opponent	Rank	Site	TV	Result	Attendance
September 7	6:00 pm	Boise State*		Donald W. Reynolds Razorback Stadium; Fayetteville, AR		W 41–14	70,142
September 14	6:00 pm	South Florida*		War Memorial Stadium; Little Rock, AR		W 42–3	55,817
September 28	6:45 pm	Alabama		Donald W. Reynolds Razorback Stadium; Fayetteville, AR	ESPN	L 12–30	73,551
October 5	6:45 pm	at No. 10 Tennessee		Neyland Stadium; Knoxville, TN	ESPN	L 38–41 ^{6OT}	105,688
October 12	11:30 am	at No. 24 Auburn		Jordan–Hare Stadium; Auburn, AL	JPS	W 38–17	84,692
October 19	1:00 pm	Kentucky		Donald W. Reynolds Razorback Stadium; Fayetteville, AR		L 17–29	61,573
October 26	1:00 pm	Ole Miss^{†}		Donald W. Reynolds Razorback Stadium; Fayetteville, AR (rivalry)		W 48–28	71,723
November 2	1:00 pm	Troy State*		War Memorial Stadium; Little Rock, AR		W 23–0	42,817
November 9	11:30 am	at South Carolina		Williams–Brice Stadium; Columbia, SC	JPS	W 23–0	79,307
November 16	1:00 pm	Louisiana–Lafayette*		Donald W. Reynolds Razorback Stadium; Fayetteville, AR		W 24–17	54,843
November 23	1:30 pm	at Mississippi State		Davis Wade Stadium; Starkville, MS		W 26–19	40,108
November 29	1:30 pm	No. 18 LSU		War Memorial Stadium; Little Rock, AR (rivalry)	CBS	W 21–20	55,553
December 7	5:00 pm	vs. No. 4 Georgia	No. 22	Georgia Dome; Atlanta, GA (SEC Championship Game)	CBS	L 3–30	74,835
December 30	1:00 pm	vs. Minnesota*	No. 25	The Coliseum; Nashville, TN (Music City Bowl)	ESPN	L 14–29	39,183
*Non-conference game; ^{†}Homecoming; Rankings from AP Poll released prior to the game; All times are in Central time

== Game summaries ==
=== Boise State ===
	1	2	3	4	Total
Broncos	0	0	0	14	14
Razorbacks	14	10	10	7	41

Arkansas beat Boise State for their first win of 2002. An impressive day on the ground, 217 yards, coupled with seven Boise State turnovers, helped secure the Razorback victory. A blocked punt, a passing TD and then a rushing TD put the Razorbacks off to a 21–0 advantage. After two field goals and a TD strike to Decori Birmingham, the Hogs were out to a 34–0 lead, but the Broncos got on the board twice to make it 34–14. A fake field goal gave the Hogs a first down before Jones hooked up with Richard Smith on an 18-yard touchdown pass that closed the scoring at 41–14.

Scoring summary

Quarter	Time	Drive			Team	Scoring information	Score	
Quarter	Time	Plays	Yards	TOP	Team	Scoring information	BOI	ARK
1	10:00		18	:10	BOI	Jesse Warner (BOI) punt blocked by Tony Bua returned for 22-yard touchdown by Bo Mosley (ARK), Shawn Andrews kick good	0	7
1	3:15		83	2:10	ARK	Mark Pierce 14-yard touchdown reception from Matt Jones, Brennan O'Donohoe kick good	0	14
2	9:45		43	1:40	ARK	Cedric Cobbs 38-yard touchdown run, Brennan O'Donohoe kick good	0	21
2	7:00		46	3:35	ARK	32-yard field goal by Brennan O'Donohoe	0	24
3	8:30		31	1:50	ARK	Decori Birmingham 6-yard touchdown reception from Matt Jones, Brennan O'Donohoe kick good	0	31
3	6:00		8	1:40	ARK	33-yard field goal by Brennan O'Donohoe	0	34
3	:30		41	3:40	BOI	Lou Fanucchi 17-yard touchdown reception from B.J. Rhode, Jesse Warner kick good	7	34
4	7:30		49	:12	BOI	Lou Fanucchi 49-yard touchdown reception from B.J. Rhode, Jesse Warner kick good	14	34
4	7:20		51	3:20	ARK	Richard Smith 22-yard touchdown reception from Matt Jones, Brennan O'Donohoe kick good	14	41
"TOP" = time of possession. For other American football terms, see Glossary of American football.							14	41

=== South Florida ===
	1	2	3	4	Total
Bulls	0	0	0	3	3
Razorbacks	21	14	7	0	42

Thirty five first half points and 547 yards of total offense set the Razorbacks well on their way to their second win of the season, at the expense of the South Florida Bulls. Only a field goal with a minute left in the game kept the Razorbacks from having a shutout, which would have been their first in two years. Back-up quarterback Tarvaris Jackson led a 94-yard scoring drive of his own, after three scoring drives by Matt Jones. Jackson would eventually transfer from Arkansas to Alabama A&M after Matt Jones became the apparent starting quarterback. South Florida had eight consecutive wins, the second-longest win streak in the nation, coming into this contest.

Scoring summary

Quarter	Time	Drive			Team	Scoring information	Score	
Quarter	Time	Plays	Yards	TOP	Team	Scoring information	USF	ARK
1	9:55		64	2:06	ARK	Mark Pierce 1-yard touchdown run, Brennan O'Donohoe kick good	0	7
1	7:00		30	2:20	ARK	Richard Smith 23-yard touchdown reception from Matt Jones, Brennan O'Donohoe kick good	0	14
1	2:04		38	2:01	ARK	Cedric Cobbs 20-yard touchdown run, Brennan O'Donohoe kick good	0	21
2	15:00		94	4:11	ARK	George Wilson 12-yard touchdown reception from Tarvaris Jackson, Brennan O'Donohoe kick good	0	28
2	6:49		92	3:50	ARK	De'Arrius Howard 6-yard touchdown run, Brennan O'Donohoe kick good	0	35
3	14:04		80	4:42	ARK	George Wilson 5-yard touchdown reception from Matt Jones, Brennan O'Donohoe kick good	0	42
4	4:20		8	3:43	USF	32-yard field goal by Santiago Gramatica	3	42
"TOP" = time of possession. For other American football terms, see Glossary of American football.							14	41

=== Alabama ===
	1	2	3	4	Total
Crimson Tide	14	3	3	10	30
Razorbacks	0	7	3	2	12

Both Santonio Beard and Shaud Williams went over 100 yards for Alabama as the Tide beat Arkansas 30–12 at home. The Razorbacks never were within striking distance, as the Tide jumped out to a 14–0 lead, the first touchdown being an 80-yard scamper by Williams on the first play from scrimmage. A Crimson Tide field goal and Matt Jones TD run pushed the score to 17–7, but the Razorbacks could not penetrate the end zone again, as the two teams swapped field goals. A fourth quarter 50-yard touchdown pass from Brodie Croyle finished the Hogs, who tacked on an intentional safety to make the final 30–12.

Jones struggled throwing the ball, going just 7-of-18 for 111 yards with two interceptions. The loss was only the fourth home loss under Houston Nutt.

Scoring summary

Quarter	Time	Drive			Team	Scoring information	Score	
Quarter	Time	Plays	Yards	TOP	Team	Scoring information	ALA	ARK
1	14:15		80	:05	ALA	Shaud Williams 80-yard touchdown run, Brian Bostick kick good	7	0
1	11:50		80	2:33	ALA	Sam Collins 28-yard touchdown reception from Brodie Croyle, Brian Bostick kick good	14	0
2	15:00		20	2:38	ALA	28-yard field goal by Brian Bostick	17	0
2	8:17		76	2:10	ARK	Matt Jones 7-yard touchdown run, David Carlton kick good	17	7
3	14:48		32	2:00	ARK	33-yard field goal by Brenan O'Donohoe	17	10
3	12:32		63	2:06	ALA	36-yard field goal by Brian Bostick	20	10
4	13:36		0	:35	ALA	37-yard field goal by Brian Bostick	23	10
4	9:51		49	:05	ALA	Zack Fletcher 49-yard touchdown reception from Brodie Croyle, Brian Bostick kick good	30	10
4	2:25		-1	1:58	ALA	Crimson Tide Safety	30	12
"TOP" = time of possession. For other American football terms, see Glossary of American football.							14	41

=== Tennessee ===
	1	2	3	4	OT	2OT	3OT	4OT	5OT	6OT	Total
Razorbacks	0	3	0	14	3	3	0	6	6	3	38
# 10 Volunteers	3	7	0	7	3	3	0	6	6	6	41

A six-overtime shootout was the result of the meeting between the Volunteers and the Razorbacks at Neyland Stadium in 2002. The battle-tested Razorbacks had come out victorious from a seven-overtime affair against Ole Miss the year previous. This was the longest game in NCAA Division I-A (now FBS) history. Arkansas' success in (especially multiple) overtime situations provoked Coach Houston Nutt into being quoted as saying at the beginning of the first overtime: "This is our game. We're ready." This overtime loss was the first for Arkansas in their football history.

The game began relatively low-scoring, with the Volunteers holding a 17–3 lead for the majority of the game. Tennessee leading rusher Cedric Houston missed the game with a torn ligament in his left thumb. Arkansas had injury problems of its own, and became one-dimensional with Cedric Cobbs, the Hogs' starting running back, missing much of the second half with a turf toe injury. The Razorbacks got the ball with ten minutes left in the fourth quarter and scored two touchdowns in a span of 4½ minutes. The tying touchdown was a 92-yard touchdown pass to Richard Smith from Matt Jones. Said Jones of that play after the game, "The coaches have told us never to quit, and we were down seven at our own 8, I kept thinking about that." This was at the time the longest offensive play in the history of Arkansas football, since surpassed by Broderick Green's 99-yard rush against Eastern Michigan in 2009.

Both teams swapped field goals for the first two periods. The third was scoreless, despite an opportunity for Arkansas to shut the door with a field goal attempt. Arkansas then scored on a Matt Jones run, but failed the two-point conversion, which is required versus an extra point in the third overtime or later. The Volunteers answered the call on their first play, a 25-yard touchdown pass to wide receiver Tony Brown, but the Volunteers also failed the two, sending the game into a fifth extra period.

Tennessee's Jabari Davis then ran into the end zone, but fumbled the ball as he crossed the plane of the goal line, but teammate and backfield mate Troy Fleming fell on the ball giving Rocky Top a six-point lead. Quarterback Casey Clausen was then sacked on the two point try. De'Arrius Howard ran in for the Hogs, but an interception by Tennessee's Julian Battle kept the game continuing to a sixth overtime. David Carlton kicked a 47-yard field goal for Arkansas in the sixth overtime, but future NFL All-Pro tight end Jason Witten caught a touchdown pass from Casey Clausen, ending the game in dramatic fashion, 41–38.

Scoring summary

Quarter	Time	Drive			Team	Scoring information	Score	
Quarter	Time	Plays	Yards	TOP	Team	Scoring information	ARK	TENN
1	9:00		52	1:53	TENN	22-yard field goal by Phillip Newman	0	3
1	:20		67	1:50	TENN	Jabari Davis 3-yard touchdown run, Phillip Newman kick good	0	10
2	11:36		52	3:41	ARK	45-yard field goal by Brennan O'Donohoe	3	10
4	1:03		81	4:04	TENN	Jabari Davis 80-yard touchdown run, Phillip Newman kick good	3	17
4	10:01		61	2:18	ARK	De'Arrius Howard 11-yard touchdown run, Brennan O'Donohoe kick good	10	17
4	3:45		92	:10	ARK	Richard Smith 92-yard touchdown reception from Matt Jones, Brennan O'Donohoe kick good	17	17
OT			8		TENN	33-yard field goal by Phillip Newman	17	20
OT			12		ARK	29-yard field goal by Brennan O'Donohoe	20	20
2OT			13		ARK	29-yard field goal by Brennan O'Donohoe	23	20
2OT			9		TENN	32-yard field goal by Phillip Newman	23	23
4OT			25		ARK	Matt Jones 6-yard touchdown run, 2-point pass from Jones incomplete to Pierce	29	23
4OT			25		TENN	Tony Brown 25-yard touchdown reception from Casey Clausen, 2-point pass from Clausen incomplete to Witten	29	29
5OT			25		TENN	Jabari Davis 12-yard touchdown run, 2-point QB Draw by Clausen no good	29	35
5OT			25		ARK	De'Arrius Howard 1-yard touchdown run, 2-point pass from Jones to Wilson intercepted by Battle.	35	35
6OT			-4		ARK	47-yard field goal by Brennan O'Donohoe	38	35
6OT			25		TENN	Jason Witten 25-yard touchdown reception from Casey Clausen	38	41
"TOP" = time of possession. For other American football terms, see Glossary of American football.							38	41

=== Auburn ===
	1	2	3	4	Total
Razorbacks	7	17	7	7	38
No. 24 Tigers	10	7	0	0	17

Arkansas came out strong after their six overtime game with Tennessee. The Hogs Fred Talley rushed for 241 yards, 80 of those in one play, in a 38–17 upset of the Tigers at Auburn. 241 yards remains to this day the most given up by an Auburn defense to a single rusher. Talley was a pleasant surprise fill-in for injured starter Cedric Cobbs. Talley lead the Hogs in a 426-yard rushing effort as a team. Talley had only 123 yards in the first four games of the year. Fullback Mark Pierce also had a 44-yard run on a fourth-and-one, with Matt Jones adding a 70-yard touchdown scamper in the fourth quarter.

Auburn seemed the likely one for a big day on the ground with a touted running back Carnell "Cadillac" Williams. A year previous Cadillac had his break-out game against Arkansas, moving him from third to first on the depth chart at the expense of the Razorbacks. Said Arkansas defensive tackle Jermaine Brooks on Williams, "We gave the Cadillac a flat tire" and, "we just got sick and tired of [hearing about Williams]. If you stop him, you stop Auburn."

Scoring summary

Quarter	Time	Drive			Team	Scoring information	Score	
Quarter	Time	Plays	Yards	TOP	Team	Scoring information	ARK	AUB
1	8:00		51	5:20	ARK	De'Arrius Howard 3-yard touchdown run, David Carlton kick good	7	0
1	3:00		66	:07	AUB	Devin Aromashodu 66-yard touchdown reception from Daniel Cobb, Damon Duval kick good	7	7
1	1:45		3	:57	AUB	33-yard field goal by Damon Duval	7	10
2	15:00		80	4:20	ARK	Mark Pierce 2-yard touchdown run, David Carlton kick good	14	10
2	5:42		89	3:42	AUB	Cadillac Williams 9-yard touchdown run, Damon Duval kick good	14	17
2	1:40		80	:05	ARK	Fred Talley 80-yard touchdown run, David Carlton kick good	21	17
2	:25		8	:16	ARK	21-yard field goal by David Carlton	24	17
3	11:02		83	2:22	ARK	Mark Pierce 44-yard touchdown run, David Carlton kick good	31	17
4	3:25		72	:15	ARK	Matt Jones 70-yard touchdown run, David Carlton kick good	38	17
"TOP" = time of possession. For other American football terms, see Glossary of American football.							38	17

=== Kentucky ===
	1	2	3	4	Total
Wildcats	3	6	20	0	29
Razorbacks	7	3	7	0	17

Arkansas' ground game continued to impress, with 293 yards, 182 of those from freshman Fred Talley. Overall, Arkansas had 515 yards of total offense to UK's 332. Quarterback Matt Jones set career marks with 15 completions and 210 yards. None of this, was enough as Kentucky managed a 29–17 victory.

Kentucky drove the opening kickoff 40 yards and kicker Taylor Begley hit on a 50-yard field goal. Arkansas had their field goal blocked on the ensuing possession, but fullback Mark Pierce later rumbled for a 34-yard score for the Razorbacks. An Arkansas field goal added to the lead to make it 10–3. Jared Lorenzen threw a touchdown pass right before halftime, but the extra point was blocked by Pervis Osborne of Arkansas. Arkansas held a one-point edge coming out of halftime when the Wildcats came out with a twenty-point scoring flurry. First a Matt Jones interception gave the Wildcats good field position, setting up an Artose Pinner TD run. Then, an 86-yard punt return by Derek Abney gave Kentucky a 22–10 lead, following a missed extra point. Razorback De'Arrius Howard scored from one yard out, but Jared Lorenzen hit Aaron Boone on a screen pass that went 18 yards to paydirt. Arkansas had two red zone opportunities in the fourth quarter, but neither team could dent the scoreboard, and Kentucky won, 29–17.

Scoring summary

Quarter	Time	Drive			Team	Scoring information	Score	
Quarter	Time	Plays	Yards	TOP	Team	Scoring information	UK	ARK
1	14:45		40	1:54	UK	50-yard field goal by Taylor Begley	3	0
1	10:11		86	:21	ARK	Mark Pierce 34-yard touchdown run, David Carlton kick good	3	7
1	2:01		-6	5:00	ARK	26-yard field goal by David Carlton	3	10
2	7:50		51	5:40	UK	Tommy Cook 4-yard touchdown reception from Jared Lorenzen, Taylor Begley kick no good	9	10
3	14:55		12	:05	UK	Artose Pinner 12-yard touchdown run, Taylor Begley kick good	16	10
3	12:20		86	:05	UK	Punt by Richie Butler (ARK) returned 86 yards by Derek Abney (UK) for a touchdown, Taylor Begley kick no good	22	10
3	11:39		65	3:30	ARK	De'Arrius Howard 1-yard touchdown run, David Carlton kick good	22	17
3	4:53		16	:40	UK	Aaron Boone 18-yard touchdown reception from Jared Lorenzen, Taylor Begley kick good	29	17
"TOP" = time of possession. For other American football terms, see Glossary of American football.							29	17

=== Ole Miss ===
	1	2	3	4	Total
Rebels	2	9	3	14	28
Razorbacks	10	17	14	7	48

Arkansas ran for 257 yards, and Ole Miss QB Eli Manning threw for 414 yards with two touchdowns and two interceptions. The first points of the game came for the Rebels when Matt Jones was called for intentionally grounding in the end zone, which by rule is scored a safety. Ole Miss gained a 2–0 lead, but fumbled near the close of the first quarter, resulting in a Razorback field goal. Lerinezo Robinson for the Hogs then returned a fumbled kickoff eight yards for a touchdown, giving Arkansas a 10–2 lead. Jonathan Nichols of Ole Miss then hit a 48-yard field, but a Jimmy Beasley interception of Eli Manning set up Arkansas for a 34-yard option keep touchdown by Matt Jones, giving an edge to the Hogs, 17–5. Manning then connected with Justin Sawyer, but the two point play was no good. First a field goal, then a touchdown closed out the first half for the Razorbacks, the TD set up by a 55-yard punt return by Decori Birmingham, to the Ole Miss 20.

The Rebels began the second half with 25-yard field goal. A 63-yard run by Fred Talley set up another Razorback touchdown, and Razorback Tom Crowder recovered the kickoff fumbled by Ole Miss in the end zone, to push the score to 41–14. Manning completed a drive with a 20-yard touchdown pass, but with just over ten minutes left, it was too little to late. Each team then added another touchdown before the Razorbacks homecoming game went final, 48–28. The Razorbacks' outstanding ground game was helped out by five Rebels turnovers, which led to 24 Razorback points.

Scoring summary

Quarter	Time	Drive			Team	Scoring information	Score	
Quarter	Time	Plays	Yards	TOP	Team	Scoring information	MISS	ARK
1	10:50		-3	:48	ARK	Matt Jones intentional grounding in the endzone, penalty results in safety	2	0
1	5:02		67	:50	ARK	29-yard field goal by David Carlton	2	3
1	1:49		10	:05	ARK	Lerinezo Robinson recovers fumbled kickoff for touchdown	2	10
1	1:30		44	4:19	MISS	47-yard field goal by Brad Nichols	5	10
2	11:07		34	:04	ARK	Matt Jones 34-yard touchdown run, David Carlton kick good	5	17
2	11:07		75	2:30	MISS	Justin Sawyer 13-yard touchdown reception from Eli Manning, 2-point pass from Manning to Flowers incomplete	11	17
2	3:40		20	1:40	ARK	37-yard field goal by David Carlton	11	20
2	:32		22	:08	ARK	George Wilson 22-yard touchdown reception from Matt Jones, David Carlton kick good	11	27
3	15:00		72	3:40	MISS	25-yard field goal by Brad Nichols	14	27
3	9:13		80	1:12	ARK	De'Arrius Howard 5-yard touchdown run, David Carlton kick good	14	34
3	8:01		1	:02	ARK	Lerinezo Robinson 1-yard touchdown run, David Carlton kick good	14	41
4	13:04		36	2:30	MISS	Jason Armstead 20-yard touchdown reception from Eli Manning, Brad Nichols kick good	21	41
4	5:30		80	2:00	MISS	Eli Manning 1-yard touchdown run, Brad Nichols kick good	28	41
4	3:13		55	:10	ARK	De'Arrius Howard 38-yard touchdown run, David Carlton kick good	28	48
"TOP" = time of possession. For other American football terms, see Glossary of American football.							28	48

=== Troy State ===
	1	2	3	4	Total
Trojans	0	0	0	0	0
Razorbacks	7	6	3	7	23

The game was dominated by both defenses, despite a lopsided finish. Troy State's ninth-ranked defense held Arkansas under 150 total yards and six first downs. Arkansas shut out their first opponent since blanking Southwest Missouri State 38–0 in 2000. Special teams stepped up for the Hogs, and two blocked punts, one recovered in the end zone, helped out a struggling offense.

Scoring summary

Quarter	Time	Drive			Team	Scoring information	Score	
Quarter	Time	Plays	Yards	TOP	Team	Scoring information	TROY	ARK
1	5:34		-4	:48	TROY	Trojans punt blocked, recovered by Bo Mosley (ARK), advanced for a touchdown. David Carlton kick good	0	7
2	2:20		31	:28	ARK	George Wilson 10-yard touchdown reception from Matt Jones, David Carlton kick no good	0	13
3	15:00		41	4:00	ARK	27-yard field goal by David Carlton	0	16
4	4:35		48	:09	TROY	Hansell Bearden (TROY) pass across the middle intercepted by Bo Mosley (ARK), returned for a 48-yard touchdown. David Carlton kick good	0	23
"TOP" = time of possession. For other American football terms, see Glossary of American football.							0	23

=== South Carolina ===
	1	2	3	4	Total
Razorbacks	0	10	7	6	23
Gamecocks	0	0	0	0	0

Arkansas beat South Carolina at home as the Hogs won their second consecutive game by the count of 23–0. Matt Jones completed 10 of 18 passes for 113 yards and two scores. Defenders Gavin Walls, Eddie Jackson and Lawrence Richardson had interceptions that each lead to Arkansas points. All of these turnovers helped add to Arkansas' turnover margin of plus-1.88 per game.

Scoring summary

Quarter	Time	Drive			Team	Scoring information	Score	
Quarter	Time	Plays	Yards	TOP	Team	Scoring information	ARK	USC
2	14:50		36	:58	ARK	George Wilson 4-yard touchdown reception from Matt Jones, David Carlton kick good	7	0
2	11:40		35	:50	ARK	43-yard field goal by David Carlton	10	0
3	14:52		73	3:32	ARK	Carlos Ousley 47-yard touchdown reception from Matt Jones, David Carlton kick good	17	0
4	14:35		17	:50	ARK	27-yard field goal by David Carlton	20	0
4	11:48		10	1:43	ARK	22-yard field goal by David Carlton	23	0
"TOP" = time of possession. For other American football terms, see Glossary of American football.							23	0

=== Louisiana–Lafayette ===
	1	2	3	4	Total
Ragin' Cajuns	0	10	0	7	17
Razorbacks	10	7	0	7	24

Arkansas won their fourth straight game and improved to 16–0 in non-conference play under Houston Nutt with this win. Matt Jones lead rushers with a season-high 129 yards, and the Razorbacks out gained the Ragin' Cajuns on the ground 263 yards to 61. The Hog defense had held every opponent out of the end zone for nine quarters until a pass from Eric Rekieta to Fred Stamps late in the second quarter. Future NFL cornerback Charles Tillman recovered a blocked punt in the fourth quarter, which was the first time since 1991 the Hogs allowed a touchdown off a blocked punt.

Scoring summary

Quarter	Time	Drive			Team	Scoring information	Score	
Quarter	Time	Plays	Yards	TOP	Team	Scoring information	ULL	ARK
1	7:00		61	:30	ARK	Matt Jones 62-yard touchdown run, David Carlton kick good	0	7
1	4:00		53	:20	ARK	22-yard field goal by David Carlton	0	10
2	8:10		70	2:30	ULL	Frederick Stamps 24-yard touchdown reception from Eric Rekieta, Sean Comiskey kick good	7	10
2	4:30		70	:48	ARK	Carlos Ousley 24-yard touchdown reception from Matt Jones, David Carlton kick good	7	17
2	:26		13	:26	ULL	25-yard field goal by Sean Comiskey	10	17
3	3:03		58	3:56	ARK	Decori Birmingham 19-yard touchdown reception from Matt Jones, David Carlton kick good	10	24
4	3:06		-2	1:20	ARK	Razorbacks punt blocked, recovered by Charles Tillman (ULL), advanced for a touchdown.	17	24
"TOP" = time of possession. For other American football terms, see Glossary of American football.							17	24

=== Mississippi State ===
	1	2	3	4	Total
Razorbacks	7	12	0	7	26
Bulldogs	3	0	3	13	19

Arkansas went to Scott Field to play winless-in-the-SEC Mississippi State. The Razorbacks defense held on a fourth down play which saved the game. The Razorbacks ran for 237 yards, 121 of those from freshman tailback De'Arruis Howard. Fred Talley fell just short of his fourth 100-yard game as he ran for 94 yards. Mississippi State used two quarterbacks, Kevin Fant was 14-of-26 for 115 yards with an interception. Kyle York entered in the third quarter and went 11-of-22 for 174 yards with one interception and two TDs.

Bulldogs kicker Brent Smith scored the first points of the contest, but two Matt Jones touchdown passes put the Hogs up 14–3. Kevin Fant was sacked by Clarke Moore in the end zone to add two more points for Arkansas. David Carlton added a field goal, his fifth consecutive made field goal. Mississippi State added its own field goal, just before fullback Mark Pierce reached the end zone from five yards out. A comeback was engineered by replacement quarterback Kyle York for the Bulldogs, but it fell seven points short, 26–19.

Scoring summary

Quarter	Time	Drive			Team	Scoring information	Score	
Quarter	Time	Plays	Yards	TOP	Team	Scoring information	ARK	MSU
1	14:50		61	7:00	MSU	25-yard field goal by Brent Smith	0	3
1	8:09		75	3:20	ARK	George Wilson 8-yard touchdown reception from Matt Jones, David Carlton kick good	7	3
1	3:30		86	9:50	ARK	Mark Pierce 15-yard touchdown reception from Matt Jones, David Carlton kick good	14	3
2	8:40		-5	:40	MSU	Kevin Fant tackled in end zone for a safety by Clark Moore	16	3
2	7:40		50	2:10	ARK	25-yard field goal by David Carlton	19	3
3	6:40		37	3:20	MSU	32-yard field goal by Brent Smith	19	6
3	2:30		57	5:00	ARK	Mark Pierce 5-yard touchdown run, David Carlton kick good	26	6
4	13:20		78	2:20	MSU	Antonio Hargro 21-yard touchdown reception from Kyle York, 2-point pass from York to Hargro is no good	26	12
4	5:40		81	2:09	MSU	Ray Ray Bivines 26-yard touchdown reception from Kyle York, Brent Smith kick good	26	19
"TOP" = time of possession. For other American football terms, see Glossary of American football.							26	19

=== LSU ===
	1	2	3	4	Total
No. 18 Tigers	7	3	7	3	20
Razorbacks	0	0	7	14	21

Arkansas and LSU played in War Memorial Stadium for the Golden Boot, a gold trophy that resembles the two states of Arkansas and Louisiana, forming a boot. Arkansas clinched the SEC West crown with this win, moving the Razorbacks to 9–3 overall.

With nine seconds left, Quarterback Matt Jones threw a 31-yard touchdown pass to Decori Birmingham, and kicker David Carlton made a long extra point to finish the Tigers off, 21–20. Down 20–14 with 34 seconds remaining, the Razorbacks first play was a 50-yard pass to Richard Smith. After an incompletion, Jones found Birmingham in the end zone, who outleaped Randall Gay for the catch. As Hog fans poured onto the field, Arkansas was then penalized 15 yards for excessive celebration, moving the go-ahead extra point to the 35-yard line. Carlton's kick was long enough, but curved left and just snuck in the goal post for a 21–20 lead. Houston Nutt later said that when he was sharing with Jones the plays to run Jones simply said, despite completing only two passes up to that point, "I've got it."

The finish was similar to the Bluegrass Miracle, which involved the same LSU Tigers winning on a last-second 75-yard Hail Mary pass to Devery Henderson to beat the Kentucky Wildcats.

Scoring summary

Quarter	Time	Drive			Team	Scoring information	Score	
Quarter	Time	Plays	Yards	TOP	Team	Scoring information	LSU	ARK
1	9:58		86	3:38	LSU	Skyler Green 67-yard touchdown reception from Marcus Randall, John Corbello kick good	7	0
2	3:18		57	3:18	LSU	48-yard field goal by John Corbello	10	0
3	13:03		61	4:13	ARK	Mark Pierce 1-yard touchdown run, David Carlton kick good	10	7
3	8:26		89	2:06	LSU	Marcus Randall 5-yard touchdown run, John Corbello kick good	17	7
4	7:57		80	:24	ARK	Fred Talley 56-yard touchdown run, David Carlton kick good	17	14
4	6:23		53	5:40	LSU	29-yard field goal by John Corbello	20	14
4	:34		80	:25	ARK	Decori Birmingham 31-yard touchdown reception from Matt Jones, David Carlton kick good	20	21
"TOP" = time of possession. For other American football terms, see Glossary of American football.							20	21

=== Georgia—SEC Championship Game ===
	1	2	3	4	Total
No. 4Bulldogs	17	6	0	7	30
#22 Razorbacks	0	0	3	0	3

Arkansas represented the Western Division of the SEC in the SEC Championship game in 2002. Arkansas was down 17–0 to Georgia before they gained one yard in the contest, giving the conference title to the Bulldogs. With the loss, Arkansas had only scored six points in two SEC title game appearances, while in contrast, Razorback opponents have scored 64 points against them. Arkansas would make a much better showing their next time in Atlanta, but fail to win again in the 2006 SEC Championship Game against the Florida Gators.

Arkansas got off on the wrong foot as punter Richie Butler's punt was blocked, setting up a one-yard touchdown run for Georgia running back Musa Smith. Another run by Smith pushed the Bulldog advantage to 14–0. Three Georgia field goals added to the score to make it 23–0. Arkansas had only one scoring drive, but even that was on life support, kept alive by two personal fouls, one after an incompletion on 3rd and 23. Georgia added a touchdown, won the game 30–3, and with the victory won the Southeastern Conference.

Coach Houston Nutt said after the game, "I felt like they were playing with 12 men, they have few weaknesses."

Scoring summary

Quarter	Time	Drive			Team	Scoring information	Score	
Quarter	Time	Plays	Yards	TOP	Team	Scoring information	UGA	ARK
1	13:00		2	1:10	UGA	Musa Smith 2-yard touchdown run, Billy Bennett kick good	7	0
1	10:28		62	:20	UGA	Musa Smith 17-yard touchdown run, Billy Bennett kick good	14	0
1	6:32		52	1:58	UGA	29-yard field goal by Billy Bennett	17	0
1	:19		42	:22	UGA	42-yard field goal by Billy Bennett	20	0
2	9:54		59	2:34	UGA	39-yard field goal by Billy Bennett	23	0
3	7:22		65	5:07	ARK	27-yard field goal by David Carlton	23	3
3	:41		81	2:10	UGA	Benjamin Watson 21-yard touchdown reception from David Greene, Billy Bennett kick good	30	3
"TOP" = time of possession. For other American football terms, see Glossary of American football.							30	3

=== Minnesota—Music City Bowl ===
	1	2	3	4	Total
Razorbacks	7	0	0	7	14
Golden Gophers	6	6	7	10	29

Minnesota kicker Dan Nystrom made five field goals as the Golden Gophers upset Arkansas in the Music City Bowl. Nystrom was named the MVP, a rarity for a kicker. Nystrom could have had a sixth attempt, but Minnesota instead went for a first down on a fourth and five and was denied with 2:46 remaining in the game.

Arkansas, the best rushing team in the SEC, had only eighty yards on the ground. This was well below their average of 226.9 yards per game. A halftime pass caught by Smith in the end zone would have given Arkansas a halftime lead, but Smith was declared out of bounds, and the score was nullified. The Razorback defense, ranked 40th best in the nation, bent but did not break. The Gophers were stopped and had to settle for field goals three times inside the Arkansas 7.

Scoring summary

Quarter	Time	Drive			Team	Scoring information	Score	
Quarter	Time	Plays	Yards	TOP	Team	Scoring information	ARK	MIN
1	14:47		74	2:11	ARK	George Wilson 2-yard touchdown reception from Matt Jones, David Carlton kick good	7	0
1	11:54		82	2:16	MIN	24-yard field goal by Dan Nystrom	7	3
1	6:06		5	:34	MIN	45-yard field goal by Dan Nystrom	7	6
1	2:33		62	3:14	MIN	21-yard field goal by Dan Nystrom	7	9
2	10:21		79	2:34	MIN	22-yard field goal by Dan Nystrom	7	12
3	6:51		70	3:20	MIN	Ben Utecht 19-yard touchdown reception from Asad Abdul-Khaliq, Dan Nystrom kick good	7	19
3	:26		55	1:56	MIN	29-yard field goal by Dan Nystrom	7	22
4	11:11		49	2:18	MIN	Thomas Tapeh 33-yard touchdown run, Dan Nystrom kick good	7	29
4	7:38		73	2:02	ARK	Richard Smith 10-yard touchdown reception from Ryan Sorahan, David Carlton kick good	14	29
"TOP" = time of possession. For other American football terms, see Glossary of American football.							14	29

== Personnel ==
=== Coaching staff ===
2002 Arkansas Razorbacks coaching staff
Head coach: Head coach – Houston Nutt; Offensive coaches: Quarterbacks – David Lee; Running backs – Danny Nutt; Receivers – James Shibest; Tight ends – George Pugh; Offensive line – Mike Markuson; Defensive coaches: Defensive coordinator – Dave Wommack; Middle and strong side linebackers – Bobby Allen; Outside linebackers/strong safeties – Chris Vaughn; Defensive line – Kacy Rodgers; Secondary – Dave Wommack; Administrative staff: Athletic director (AD) – Frank Broyles; Director of football operations – Louis Campbell; Strength and conditioning – Don Decker; Recruiting coordinator – George Pugh

=== Roster ===
2002 Arkansas Razorbacks football team roster
Players			Coaches
Offense: Pos. / # / Name / Class	Defense: Pos. / # / Name / Class; FS / 6 / Ken Hamlin / Sr	Special teams: Pos. / # / Name / Class	Head coach: Houston Nutt; Coordinators/assistant coaches Legend: (C) Team captain; (S) Suspended; (I) Ineligible; Injured; Redshirt; Roster

== Awards and honors ==
=== All–SEC ===
- Fred Talley (RB Sr.) 1st Team All-SEC Offense (Coaches'), 2nd Team All-SEC Offense (AP)
- Shawn Andrews (OT, So.) 1st Team All-SEC Offense, Jacobs Blocking Trophy
- Ken Hamlin (FS Jr.) 1st Team All-SEC Defense
- Ahmad Carroll (CB, So.) 2nd Team All-SEC Defense
- Tony Bua (OLB Jr.) 2nd Team All-SEC Defense

=== All-Americans ===
==== Offense ====
- Shawn Andrews (OT, So.) AP/Coaches 1st Team

==== Defense ====
- Ahmad Carroll (CB, So.) Coaches 2nd Team
- Ken Hamlin (FS Jr.) AP/Coaches 1st Team
- Tony Bua (LB/FS Jr.) AP/Coaches 2nd Team

== Statistics ==
Arkansas native Matt Jones was the signal caller for the Razorbacks in 2002. Jones also played basketball on the Razorback basketball team. Jones currently holds the SEC record for most rushing yards by a quarterback, but with the advent of the Spread offense in college football, and new dynamic players in the SEC, his record is in danger of being broken.

Opponent	Comp	Att	Yards	TD	INT	Rush	Rush yds	Rush TD
Boise State	7	14	106	3	0	11	70	0
South Florida	9	12	148	2	0	5	54	0
Alabama	7	18	111	0	2	7	50	1
Tennessee	10	20	183	1	0	21	44	1
Auburn	7	13	67	0	0	6	84	1
Kentucky	15	26	210	0	1	12	52	0
Ole Miss	7	14	78	1	1	4	35	1
Troy	7	15	77	1	1	8	22	0
South Carolina	10	18	113	2	0	7	9	0
Louisiana–Lafayette	9	13	118	2	0	13	129	1
Mississippi State	8	15	90	2	0	5	-1	0
LSU	4	16	127	1	1	11	46	0
Georgia	9	16	60	0	0	6	13	0
Minnesota	12	25	118	1	2	7	13	0
Season	121	235	1606	16	8	119	620	5
