= Kyle York =

American football player (born 1982)

No. 17
- Position: Quarterback

Personal information
- Born: July 5, 1982 (age 44); Cameron, Texas, U.S.
- Listed height: 6 ft 0 in (1.83 m)
- Listed weight: 207 lb (94 kg)

Career information
- High school: Spring High School
- College: Mississippi State (2002–2004)

Kyle Tobin York (born July 5, 1982) is an American former college football player who was a quarterback for the Mississippi State Bulldogs in 2002, 2003, and 2004, starting four games.

After redshirting the 2001 season, York expected to backup Kevin Fant in 2002. However, after Fant was suspended for the first game, York started for the Bulldogs in a 36–13 loss to Oregon. York got another start later in the season when Fant was injured and led the Bulldogs to a 29–17 win over Memphis.

York backed up Fant during the 2003 season, appearing in seven games as a backup. In 2004, under new head coach Sylvester Croom, York was again named the backup quarterback, this time to Omarr Conner. However, Conner was injured in a 51–0 loss to 2004 LSU Tigers football team, and York started the next two games, a 31–13 loss to Vanderbilt, and a 27–13 loss to UAB. York did not appear in any more games in 2004. He graduated from Mississippi State in December 2004 and did not return for the 2005 season, instead enrolling in seminary.

York is currently the Lead Pastor at Harvest Church in Mississippi and previously had served in other pastoral roles in other churches. He occasionally serves as a football expert on TV and radio sports shows.

Year	Team	G	Passing						Rushing		
Year	Team	G	Cmp	Att	Pct	Yds	TD	Int	Att	Yds	TD
2002	Mississippi State	11	63	129	48.8	693	3	10	15	2	0
2003	Mississippi State	7	20	42	47.6	273	1	4	9	14	1
2004	Mississippi State	7	39	79	49.4	358	3	5	9	6	0
Career		25	122	250	48.8	1,324	7	19	33	22	1

table reference
