= 2002 Florida Gators football team =

American college football season

2002 Florida Gators football

Outback Bowl, L 30–38 vs. Michigan
- Conference: Southeastern Conference
- Eastern Division

Ranking
- Coaches: No. 24
- Record: 8–5 (6–2 SEC)
- Head coach: Ron Zook (1st season)
- Offensive coordinator: Ed Zaunbrecher (1st season)
- Offensive scheme: Spread
- Defensive coordinator: John Thompson (1st season)
- Base defense: Multiple
- Captains: Earnest Graham; Rex Grossman; Byron Hardmon; Taylor Jacobs; Todd Johnson
- Home stadium: Ben Hill Griffin Stadium

2002 Southeastern Conference football standings
	Conf.			Overall
Team	W		L	W		L
Eastern Division
No. 3 Georgia x$	7	–	1	13	–	1
Florida	6	–	2	8	–	5
Tennessee	5	–	3	8	–	5
Kentucky	3	–	5	7	–	5
South Carolina	3	–	5	5	–	7
Vanderbilt	0	–	8	2	–	10
Western Division
Arkansas xy	5	–	3	9	–	5
No. 14 Auburn x	5	–	3	9	–	4
LSU x	5	–	3	8	–	5
Ole Miss	3	–	5	7	–	6
Mississippi State	0	–	8	3	–	9
No. 11 ^Alabama	6	–	2	10	–	3
Championship: Georgia 30, Arkansas 3
$ – BCS representative as conference champion; x – Division champion/co-champions; y – Championship game participant; ^ – Alabama had the best division record, but did not participate in postseason play due to NCAA probation.; Rankings from AP Poll

The 2002 Florida Gators football team represented the University of Florida as a member of the Eastern Division in the Southeastern Conference (SEC) during the 2002 NCAA Division I-A football season. Led by first-year head coach Ron Zook, the Gators compiled an overall record of 8–5 with mark of 6–2 in conference play, placing second in the SEC's Eastern Division title. Florida was invited to the Outback Bowl, where the Gators lost Michigan. The team played home games at Ben Hill Griffin Stadium on the university's Gainesville, Florida campus.

== Schedule ==
Date	Time	Opponent	Rank	Site	TV	Result	Attendance	Source
August 31	7:00 p.m.	UAB*	No. 6	Ben Hill Griffin Stadium; Gainesville, FL	PPV	W 51–3	85,575	
September 7	5:15 p.m.	No. 1 Miami (FL)*	No. 6	Ben Hill Griffin Stadium; Gainesville, FL (rivalry, College GameDay)	CBS	L 16–41	85,777	
September 14	6:00 p.m.	Ohio*	No. 12	Ben Hill Griffin Stadium; Gainesville, FL	PPV	W 34–6	84,002	
September 21	3:30 p.m.	at No. 4 Tennessee	No. 10	Neyland Stadium; Knoxville, TN (rivalry, College GameDay)	CBS	W 30–13	108,722	
September 28	3:30 p.m.	Kentucky	No. 7	Ben Hill Griffin Stadium; Gainesville, FL (rivalry)	CBS	W 41–34	85,333	
October 5	12:00 p.m.	at Ole Miss	No. 6	Vaught–Hemingway Stadium; Oxford, MS	CBS	L 14–17	61,140	
October 12	7:45 p.m.	No. 18 LSU	No. 16	Ben Hill Griffin Stadium; Gainesville, FL (rivalry)	ESPN	L 7–36	85,252	
October 19	6:45 p.m.	Auburn		Ben Hill Griffin Stadium; Gainesville, FL (rivalry)	ESPN	W 30–23 ^{OT}	85,135	
November 2	7:45 p.m.	vs. No. 5 Georgia		Alltel Stadium; Jacksonville, FL (rivalry, College GameDay)	ESPN	W 20–13	84,433	
November 9	2:00 p.m.	at Vanderbilt	No. 23	Vanderbilt Stadium; Nashville, TN	PPV	W 21–17	28,881	
November 16	6:00 p.m.	South Carolina^{†}	No. 20	Ben Hill Griffin Stadium; Gainesville, FL	ESPN	W 28–7	85,222	
November 30	8:00 p.m.	at No. 23 Florida State*	No. 15	Doak Campbell Stadium; Tallahassee, FL (rivalry)	ABC	L 14–31	83,938	
January 1, 2003	11:00 a.m.	vs. No. 12 Michigan*	No. 15	Raymond James Stadium; Tampa, FL (Outback Bowl)	ESPN	L 30–38	65,101	
*Non-conference game; ^{†}Homecoming; Rankings from AP Poll released prior to the game; All times are in Eastern time

== Game summaries ==
=== At Tennessee ===
Florida Gators (2–1) at Tennessee Volunteers (1–1)

Quarter	1	2	3	4	Total
Florida	0	24	0	6	30
Tennessee	0	0	13	0	13

at Neyland Stadium, Knoxville, Tennessee

- Date: September 21
- Game time: 3:30 p.m. EST
- Game weather: Light rain, 71 °F (22 °C)
- Game attendance: 108,722
- Referee: Rogers Redding
- TV: CBS
- Box Score

Game information

First quarter

- No scoring

Second quarter

- FLA – Earnest Graham 1-yard run (Matt Leach kick), 4:55. Florida 7–0. Drive: 9 plays, 84 yards, 3:20.
- FLA – Carlos Perez 28-yard pass from Rex Grossman (Matt Leach kick), 3:40. Florida 14–0. Drive: 3 plays, 24 yards, 1:12.
- FLA – Taylor Jacobs 7-yard pass from Rex Grossman (Matt Leach kick), 0:35. Florida 21–0. Drive: 6 plays, 62 yards, 0:52.
- FLA – Matt Leach 41-yard field goal, 0:00. Florida 24–0. Drive: 1 play, 0 yards, 0:02.

Third quarter

- TENN – Derrick Tinsley 15-yard pass from Casey Clausen (Alex Walls kick), 9:51. Florida 24–7. Drive: 7 plays, 59 yards, 2:28.
- TENN – Jabari Davis 1-yard run (kick failed), 0:28. Florida 24–13. Drive: 14 plays, 64 yards, 6:27.

Fourth quarter

- FLA – Taylor Jacobs 21-yard pass from Rex Grossman (kick failed), 10:49. Florida 30–13. Drive: 11 plays, 80 yards, 4:32.

Top passers

- FLA – Rex Grossman – 20/34, 324 yards, 3 TD, 2 INT
- TENN – Casey Clausen – 30/44, 285 yards, TD

Top rushers

- FLA – Ran Carthon – 9 rushes, 51 yards
- TENN – Troy Fleming – 9 rushes, 42 yards

Top receivers

- FLA – Taylor Jacobs – 9 receptions, 141 yards, 2 TD
- TENN – Kelley Washington – 7 receptions, 102 yards

=== Kentucky ===
Team	1	2	3	4	Total
Kentucky	0	0	28	6	34
• Florida	6	13	13	9	41

- Date: September 28
- Location: Ben Hill Griffin Stadium
- Game start: 3:30 p.m.
- Elapsed time: 3:38
- Game attendance: 85,333
- Game weather: Sunny; 86 °F (30 °C); wind 9 mph (14 km/h) W
- Referee: Steve Shaw

Scoring summary
Q1	2:08	FLA	Graham 1-yard run (kick blocked)	FLA 6–0
Q2	11:55	FLA	Carthon 19-yard run (pass failed)	FLA 12–0
Q2	2:54	FLA	Carthon 6-yard run (Leach kick)	FLA 19–0
Q3	11:05	UK	Abney 14-yard pass from Lorenzen (Begley kick)	FLA 19–7
Q3	7:21	FLA	Jacobs 4-yard pass from Grossman (kick blocked)	FLA 25–7
Q3	6:59	UK	Abney 100-yard kickoff return (Begley kick)	FLA 25–14
Q3	3:21	UK	Pinner 1-yard run (Begley kick)	FLA 25–21
Q3	3:03	UK	Boone 39-yard pass from Lorenzen (Begley kick)	UK 28–25
Q3	0:18	FLA	Jacobs 35-yard pass from Grossman (Leach kick)	FLA 32–28
Q4	9:25	FLA	Ratliff 62-yard interception return (Leach kick)	FLA 39–28
Q4	5:24	UK	Abney 49-yard punt return (pass failed)	FLA 39–34
Q4	5:24	FLA	Ratliff PAT return	FLA 41–34

=== Vs. Georgia ===
Team	1	2	3	4	Total
• Florida	0	12	0	8	20
Georgia	7	6	0	0	13

- Date: Saturday, November 2
- Location: Alltel Stadium, Jacksonville, Florida
- Game start: 7:45 p.m.
- Elapsed time: 3:25
- Game attendance: 84,433
- Game weather: Clear, 58 °F (14 °C)
- Referee: Penn Wagers
- Television network: ESPN

Scoring summary
1	6:59	UGA	J.T. Wall 10-yard pass from David Greene (Billy Bennett kick) (3-48, 0:49)	UGA 7-0
2	9:39	FLA	Aaron Walker 5-yard pass from Rex Grossman (Brendt Talcott kick failed) (13-58, 5:21)	UGA 7-6
2	3:56	FLA	Guss Scott 47-yard interception return (pass failed)	FLA 12-6
2	1:20	UGA	Billy Bennett 47-yard field goal (8-48, 2:36)	FLA 12-10
2	0:03	UGA	Billy Bennett 25-yard field goal (4-(-2), 1:08)	UGA 13-12
4	11:32	FLA	Ben Troupe 10-yard pass from Rex Grossman (Grossman run) (10-89, 3:49)	FLA 20-13

== Roster ==
2002 Florida Gators football team roster
Players
Coaches
Offense

Pos.	#	Name	Class
WR	2	Kelvin Kight	Jr
RB	5	Earnest Graham	Sr
WR	6	Taylor Jacobs	Sr
QB	8	Rex Grossman	Sr
QB	10	Ingle Martin	Fr
WR	11	O. J. Small	So
OL	54	David Jorgensen	Sr
G	75	Shannon Snell	Jr
TE	82	Aaron Walker	Sr

Defense

Pos.	#	Name	Class
CB	1	Keiwan Ratliff	Jr
LB	42	Byron Hardmon	Sr
LB	59	Mike Nattiel	Sr
DE	86	Darrell Lee	Jr
DT	98	Tron LaFavor	Sr

Special teams

Pos.	#	Name	Class
K		Matt Leach

Head coach

- Ron Zook

Coordinators/assistant coaches

- Ed Zaunbrecher- Offensive Coordinator/Quarterbacks
- John Thompson – Defensive Coordinator
- Mike Woodford – Defense
- Jerry "Red" Anderson – Defensive
- Joe Wickline – Offensive Line
- Dwayne Dixon – Wide Receivers
- Larry Fedora – Running Backs
- Jerry Odom – Inside Linebackers
- Tyke Tolbert – Tight Ends/Recruiting Coordinator

Legend

- (C) Team captain
- (S) Suspended
- (I) Ineligible
- Injured
- Redshirt

Roster

== Players drafted into the NFL ==
Round	Pick	Player	Position	NFL club
1	22	Rex Grossman	QB	Chicago Bears
2	44	Taylor Jacobs	WR	Washington Redskins
4	100	Todd Johnson	S	Chicago Bears
4	116	Ian Scott	DT	Chicago Bears
5	161	Aaron Walker	TE	San Francisco 49ers
5	171	Tron LaFavor	DT	Chicago Bears
6	190	Mike Nattiel	LB	Minnesota Vikings
7	227	Clint Mitchell	DE	Denver Broncos

== Bibliography ==
- 2009 Southeastern Conference Football Media Guide, Florida Year-by-Year Records, Southeastern Conference, Birmingham, Alabama, p. 60 (2009).
- 2012 Florida Football Media Guide, University Athletic Association, Gainesville, Florida, pp. 107–116 (2012).
- Carlson, Norm, University of Florida Football Vault: The History of the Florida Gators, Whitman Publishing, LLC, Atlanta, Georgia (2007). ISBN 0-7948-2298-3.
- Golenbock, Peter, Go Gators! An Oral History of Florida's Pursuit of Gridiron Glory, Legends Publishing, LLC, St. Petersburg, Florida (2002). ISBN 0-9650782-1-3.
- Hairston, Jack, Tales from the Gator Swamp: A Collection of the Greatest Gator Stories Ever Told, Sports Publishing, LLC, Champaign, Illinois (2002). ISBN 1-58261-514-4.
