= 2002 Vanderbilt Commodores football team =

American college football season

2002 Vanderbilt Commodores football
- Conference: Southeastern Conference
- Eastern Division
- Record: 2–10 (0–8 SEC)
- Head coach: Bobby Johnson (1st season)
- Offensive coordinator: Ted Cain (1st season)
- Offensive scheme: Multiple
- Defensive coordinator: Bruce Fowler (1st season)
- Base defense: 4–3
- Captains: Jamie Byrum; Rushen Jones; Dan Stricker
- Home stadium: Vanderbilt Stadium

2002 Southeastern Conference football standings
	Conf.			Overall
Team	W		L	W		L
Eastern Division
No. 3 Georgia x$	7	–	1	13	–	1
Florida	6	–	2	8	–	5
Tennessee	5	–	3	8	–	5
Kentucky	3	–	5	7	–	5
South Carolina	3	–	5	5	–	7
Vanderbilt	0	–	8	2	–	10
Western Division
Arkansas xy	5	–	3	9	–	5
No. 14 Auburn x	5	–	3	9	–	4
LSU x	5	–	3	8	–	5
Ole Miss	3	–	5	7	–	6
Mississippi State	0	–	8	3	–	9
No. 11 ^Alabama	6	–	2	10	–	3
Championship: Georgia 30, Arkansas 3
$ – BCS representative as conference champion; x – Division champion/co-champions; y – Championship game participant; ^ – Alabama had the best division record, but did not participate in postseason play due to NCAA probation.; Rankings from AP Poll

The 2002 Vanderbilt Commodores football team represented Vanderbilt University as a member of the Eastern Division of the Southeastern Conference (SEC) during the 2002 NCAA Division I-A football season. Led by first-year head coach Bobby Johnson, the Commodores compiled an overall record of 2–10 with a mark of 0–8 in conference play, placing last out of six teams in the SEC's Eastern Division. The team played its home games at Vanderbilt Stadium in Nashville, Tennessee.

== Schedule ==
Date	Time	Opponent	Site	TV	Result	Attendance	Source
August 31	5:00 p.m.	at Georgia Tech*	Bobby Dodd Stadium; Atlanta, GA (rivalry)		L 3–45	43,719	
September 7	6:00 p.m.	Furman*	Vanderbilt Stadium; Nashville, TN		W 49–18	28,568	
September 14	11:30 a.m.	at Auburn	Jordan–Hare Stadium; Auburn, AL	JPS	L 6–31	76,127	
September 21	11:30 a.m.	at Ole Miss	Vaught–Hemingway Stadium; Oxford, MS (rivalry)	JPS	L 38–45	50,427	
September 28	6:00 p.m.	South Carolina	Vanderbilt Stadium; Nashville, TN	PPV	L 14–20	34,406	
October 12	6:00 p.m.	Middle Tennessee State*	Vanderbilt Stadium; Nashville, TN		L 20–21	28,660	
October 19	11:30 a.m.	at No. 5 Georgia	Sanford Stadium; Athens, GA (rivalry)	JPS	L 17–48	86,520	
October 26	11:00 a.m.	Connecticut*	Vanderbilt Stadium; Nashville, TN		W 28–24	21,210	
November 2	1:00 p.m.	No. 12 Alabama	Vanderbilt Stadium; Nashville, TN	PPV	L 8–30	36,407	
November 9	1:00 p.m.	No. 23 Florida	Vanderbilt Stadium; Nashville, TN	PPV	L 17–21	28,881	
November 16	12:30 p.m.	at Kentucky	Commonwealth Stadium; Lexington, KY (rivalry)		L 21–41	51,114	
November 23	11:30 a.m.	Tennessee	The Coliseum; Nashville, TN (rivalry)	JPS	L 0–24	47,210	
*Non-conference game; Rankings from AP Poll released prior to the game; All times are in Central time

== Game summaries ==
=== Georgia Tech ===
Team	1	2	3	4	Total
Vanderbilt	0	0	0	3	3
• Georgia Tech	0	31	14	0	45

- Location: Atlanta
- Game start: 5:00 p.m.
- Game attendance: 43,719

Quarter	Time	Team	TD/FG	Type of score	Extra PT	Vandy	Georgia Tech
Second Quarter	15:00	GT	TD	1-yard passing touchdown	extra point is good	0	7
Second Quarter	10:06	GT	TD	2-yard rushing touchdown	extra point is good	0	14
Second Quarter	7:00	GT	TD	38-yard passing touchdown	extra point is good	0	21
Second Quarter	4:11	GT	FG	field goal	-	0	24
Second Quarter	1:26	GT	TD	4-yard passing touchdown	extra point is good	0	30
Third Quarter	13:37	GT	TD	56-yard rushing touchdown	extra point is good	0	37
Third Quarter	0:32	GT	TD	5-yard rushing touchdown	extra point is good	0	44
Fourth Quarter	3:30	VAN	FG	field goal	-	3	45

== Roster ==
2002 Vanderbilt Commodores football team roster
Players
Coaches
Offense

Pos.	#	Name	Class
QB	6	Jay Cutler	Fr
G	72	Jim May	Sr

Defense

Pos.	#	Name	Class
DB	5	Aaron McWherter	Sr
LB	47	Hunter Hillenmeyer	Sr

Special teams

Pos.	#	Name	Class

Head coach

- Bobby Johnson

Coordinators/assistant coaches

Legend

- (C) Team captain
- (S) Suspended
- (I) Ineligible
- Injured
- Redshirt

Roster
Last update: 2003-02-10

== Team players drafted into the NFL ==
Player	Position	Round	Pick	NFL club
Hunter Hillenmeyer	LB	5	166	Green Bay Packers
