= 2002 Tennessee Volunteers football team =

American college football season

2002 Tennessee Volunteers football

Peach Bowl, L 3–30 vs. Maryland
- Conference: Southeastern Conference
- Eastern Division
- Record: 8–5 (5–3 SEC)
- Head coach: Phillip Fulmer (10th season)
- Offensive coordinator: Randy Sanders (4th season)
- Offensive scheme: Pro-style
- Defensive coordinator: John Chavis (8th season)
- Base defense: Multiple 4–3
- Home stadium: Neyland Stadium

2002 Southeastern Conference football standings
	Conf.			Overall
Team	W		L	W		L
Eastern Division
No. 3 Georgia x$	7	–	1	13	–	1
Florida	6	–	2	8	–	5
Tennessee	5	–	3	8	–	5
Kentucky	3	–	5	7	–	5
South Carolina	3	–	5	5	–	7
Vanderbilt	0	–	8	2	–	10
Western Division
Arkansas xy	5	–	3	9	–	5
No. 14 Auburn x	5	–	3	9	–	4
LSU x	5	–	3	8	–	5
Ole Miss	3	–	5	7	–	6
Mississippi State	0	–	8	3	–	9
No. 11 ^Alabama	6	–	2	10	–	3
Championship: Georgia 30, Arkansas 3
$ – BCS representative as conference champion; x – Division champion/co-champions; y – Championship game participant; ^ – Alabama had the best division record, but did not participate in postseason play due to NCAA probation.; Rankings from AP Poll

The 2002 Tennessee Volunteers football team represented the University of Tennessee in the 2002 NCAA Division I-A football season. The team was coached by Phillip Fulmer. The Vols played their home games in Neyland Stadium and competed in the Eastern Division of the Southeastern Conference (SEC). The Vols finished the season 8–5, 5–3 in SEC play, and lost the Peach Bowl 30–3 to Maryland.

== Schedule ==
Date	Time	Opponent	Rank	Site	TV	Result	Attendance
August 31	6:00 pm	vs. Wyoming*	No. 4	The Coliseum; Nashville, Tennessee	ESPN2	W 47–7	67,221
September 7	4:00 pm	MTSU*	No. 4	Neyland Stadium; Knoxville, Tennessee	PPV	W 26–3	107,672
September 21	3:30 pm	No. 10 Florida	No. 4	Neyland Stadium; Knoxville, Tennessee (Third Saturday in September) (College GameDay)	CBS	L 13–30	108,722
September 28	4:00 pm	Rutgers*	No. 11	Neyland Stadium; Knoxville, Tennessee	PPV	W 35–14	103,925
October 5	7:45 pm	Arkansas	No. 10	Neyland Stadium; Knoxville, Tennessee	ESPN	W 41–38 ^{6OT}	105,688
October 12	3:30 pm	at No. 6 Georgia	No. 10	Sanford Stadium; Athens, Georgia (rivalry)	CBS	L 13–18	86,520
October 26	7:45 pm	No. 19 Alabama	No. 16	Neyland Stadium; Knoxville, Tennessee (Third Saturday in October)	ESPN	L 14–34	107,722
November 2	3:30 pm	at South Carolina	No. 25	Williams-Brice Stadium; Columbia, South Carolina (rivalry)	CBS	W 18–10	83,918
November 9	3:30 pm	No. 2 Miami (FL)*^{†}		Neyland Stadium; Knoxville, Tennessee (College GameDay)	CBS	L 3–26	108,745
November 16	12:30 pm	at Mississippi State		Davis Wade Stadium; Starkville, Mississippi	JPS	W 35–17	54,807
November 23	12:30 pm	at Vanderbilt		The Coliseum; Nashville, Tennessee (rivalry)	JPS	W 24–0	47,210
November 30	12:30 pm	Kentucky		Neyland Stadium; Knoxville, Tennessee (Battle for the Barrel)	JPS	W 24–0	107,462
December 31	7:30 pm	vs. No. 20 Maryland*		Georgia Dome; Atlanta, Georgia (Peach Bowl)	ESPN	L 3–30	71,228
*Non-conference game; ^{†}Homecoming; Rankings from AP Poll released prior to the game; All times are in Eastern time

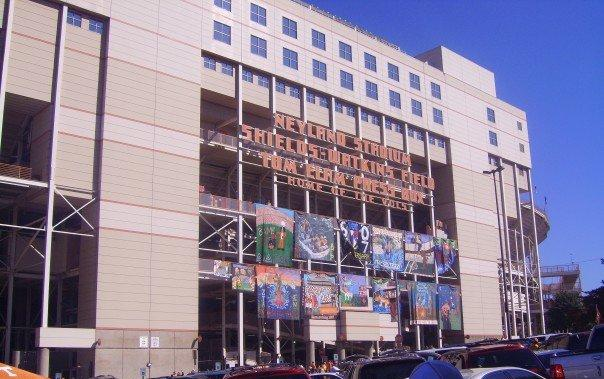
Neyland Stadium hosted seven Tennessee home games in 2002.

== Personnel ==
=== Roster ===
2002 Tennessee Volunteers football team roster
Players
Coaches
Offense

Pos.	#	Name	Class
QB	7	Casey Clausen	Jr
TE	1	Jason Witten	Sr

Defense

Pos.	#	Name	Class

Special teams

Pos.	#	Name	Class
P	47	Dustin Colquitt	So

Head coach

- Phillip Fulmer

Coordinators/assistant coaches

- Randy Sanders – Offensive coordinator/quarterbacks
- Woody McCorvey – Running backs
- Pat Washington – Wide receivers
- Mike Barry – Offensive line
- John Chavis – Defensive coordinator/linebackers
- Dan Brooks – Defensive line/recruiting coordinator
- Larry Slade – Defensive backs
- Steve Caldwell – Special teams/defensive ends

Legend

- (C) Team captain
- (S) Suspended
- (I) Ineligible
- Injured
- Redshirt

== 2003 NFL draft ==
The 2003 NFL draft was held on April 26–27, 2003 at The Theater at Madison Square Garden in New York City. The following UT players were selected:

Player	Position	Round	Pick	NFL team
Eddie Moore	LB	2nd	49	Miami Dolphins
Kelley Washington	WR	3rd	65	Cincinnati Bengals
Jason Witten	TE	3rd	69	Dallas Cowboys
Julian Battle	CB	3rd	92	Kansas City Chiefs
Aubrayo Franklin	DT	5th	146	Baltimore Ravens
Keyon Whiteside	LB	5th	162	Indianapolis Colts
Rashad Moore	DT	6th	183	Seattle Seahawks
Demetrin Veal	DE	7th	238	Atlanta Falcons
