= 2002 Alabama Crimson Tide football team =

American college football season

2002 Alabama Crimson Tide football
- Conference: Southeastern Conference
- Western Division

Ranking
- AP: No. 11
- Record: 10–3 (6–2 SEC)
- Head coach: Dennis Franchione (2nd season)
- Offensive coordinator: Les Koenning (2nd season)
- Offensive scheme: Multiple
- Defensive coordinator: Carl Torbush (2nd season)
- Base defense: 4–3
- Captains: Jarret Johnson; Kenny King; Kindal Moorehead; Tyler Watts; Ahmaad Galloway; Lane Bearden
- Home stadium: Bryant–Denny Stadium; Legion Field

2002 Southeastern Conference football standings
	Conf.			Overall
Team	W		L	W		L
Eastern Division
No. 3 Georgia x$	7	–	1	13	–	1
Florida	6	–	2	8	–	5
Tennessee	5	–	3	8	–	5
Kentucky	3	–	5	7	–	5
South Carolina	3	–	5	5	–	7
Vanderbilt	0	–	8	2	–	10
Western Division
Arkansas xy	5	–	3	9	–	5
No. 14 Auburn x	5	–	3	9	–	4
LSU x	5	–	3	8	–	5
Ole Miss	3	–	5	7	–	6
Mississippi State	0	–	8	3	–	9
No. 11 ^Alabama	6	–	2	10	–	3
Championship: Georgia 30, Arkansas 3
$ – BCS representative as conference champion; x – Division champion/co-champions; y – Championship game participant; ^ – Alabama had the best division record, but did not participate in postseason play due to NCAA probation.; Rankings from AP Poll

The 2002 Alabama Crimson Tide football team represented the University of Alabama as a member of the Southeastern Conference (SEC) during 2002 NCAA Division I-A football season. Led by Dennis Franchione in his second and final season as head coach, the Crimson Tide compiled an overall record of 10–3 with a mark of 6–2 in conference play, placing first in the SEC's Western Division. However, Alabama was ineligible to compete in the 2002 SEC Championship Game or a bowl game due to a two-year postseason ban imposed as part of the penalty for National Collegiate Athletic Association (NCAA) violations. The team played home games at Bryant–Denny Stadium in Tuscaloosa, Alabama, and Legion Field in Birmingham, Alabama.

Alabama began the season with a 4–1 record, only losing a close game at No. 8 Oklahoma. On October 5, the Crimson Tide lost another hard-fought game to the No. 4 Georgia, 27–25, at home. The team then defeated their next five opponents by an average of 24.4 points. In the Iron Bowl, Alabama lost to Auburn Tigers by a score of 17–7. The Crimson Tide ended their season with a win over Hawaii.

On December 5, Franchione left Alabama to take the head football coaching job at Texas A&M University, which was left vacant by the firing of R. C. Slocum.

== Schedule ==
Date	Time	Opponent	Rank	Site	TV	Result	Attendance	Source
August 31	11:30 a.m.	Middle Tennessee*		Legion Field; Birmingham, AL	JPS	W 39–34	80,091	
September 7	2:30 p.m.	at No. 2 Oklahoma*		Gaylord Family Oklahoma Memorial Stadium; Norman, OK	ABC	L 27–37	75,564	
September 14	6:00 p.m.	North Texas*		Bryant–Denny Stadium; Tuscaloosa, AL	PPV	W 33–7	79,818	
September 21	6:00 p.m.	Southern Miss*		Bryant–Denny Stadium; Tuscaloosa, AL	ESPN2	W 20–7	83,818	
September 28	6:45 p.m.	at Arkansas		Donald W. Reynolds Razorback Stadium; Fayetteville, AR	ESPN	W 30–12	73,551	
October 5	2:30 p.m.	No. 7 Georgia	No. 22	Bryant–Denny Stadium; Tuscaloosa, AL (rivalry, College GameDay)	CBS	L 25–27	83,818	
October 19	2:30 p.m.	No. 21 Ole Miss^{†}	No. 24	Bryant–Denny Stadium; Tuscaloosa, AL (rivalry)	CBS	W 42–7	83,818	
October 26	6:45 p.m.	at No. 16 Tennessee	No. 19	Neyland Stadium; Knoxville, TN (Third Saturday in October)	ESPN	W 34–14	107,722	
November 2	1:00 p.m.	at Vanderbilt	No. 12	Vanderbilt Stadium; Nashville, TN	PPV	W 30–8	36,407	
November 9	1:00 p.m.	Mississippi State	No. 11	Bryant–Denny Stadium; Tuscaloosa, AL (rivalry)	PPV	W 28–14	83,818	
November 16	8:00 p.m.	at No. 14 LSU	No. 10	Tiger Stadium; Baton Rouge, LA (rivalry)	ESPN	W 31–0	92,012	
November 23	2:30 p.m.	Auburn	No. 9	Bryant–Denny Stadium; Tuscaloosa, AL (Iron Bowl)	CBS	L 7–17	83,818	
November 30	6:45 p.m.	at Hawaii*	No. 14	Aloha Stadium; Halawa, HI	ESPN	W 21–16	50,000	
*Non-conference game; ^{†}Homecoming; Rankings from AP Poll released prior to the game; All times are in Central time

== Game summaries ==
=== Middle Tennessee ===
	1	2	3	4	Total
Middle Tennessee	0	11	3	20	34
Alabama	22	0	7	10	39

In the only game that Alabama would play at Legion Field in 2002, the Crimson Tide would score a season opening win for the first time since 1999.

Statistics	MTSU	Alabama
First downs	22	22
Total yards	385	430
Rushing yards	183	194
Passing yards	202	236
Turnovers	1	0
Time of possession	30:02	29:58

Team	Category	Player	Statistics
MTSU	Passing	Andrico Hines	16–24, 165 yards, 1 INT
MTSU	Rushing	ReShard Lee	11 carries, 56 yards, 1 TD
MTSU	Receiving	Tyrone Calico	7 receptions, 75 yards
Alabama	Passing	Tyler Watts	16–22, 236 yards, 2 TD
Alabama	Rushing	Ahmaad Galloway	15 carries, 77 yards, 1 TD
Alabama	Receiving	Triandos Luke	9 receptions, 85 yards

=== Oklahoma ===
	1	2	3	4	Total
Alabama	3	0	14	10	27
#3 Oklahoma	9	14	0	14	37

The first road game of the year for Alabama would prove to be one of the most exciting game of the year. Despite trailing 23–3 at halftime, Alabama roared back in the second half with 24 unanswered points to take a 27–23 lead late into the 4th quarter. Oklahoma however, scored the last 14 points to win 37–27.

Statistics	Alabama	Oklahoma
First downs	14	12
Total yards	288	283
Rushing yards	96	−23
Passing yards	192	306
Turnovers	3	1
Time of possession	36:44	23:16

Team	Category	Player	Statistics
Alabama	Passing	Tyler Watts	16–32, 185 yards, 1 INT
Alabama	Rushing	Ahmaad Galloway	18 carries, 66 yards, 1 TD
Alabama	Receiving	Sam Collins	6 receptions, 82 yards
Oklahoma	Passing	Nate Hybl	16–30, 251 yards, 1 TD
Oklahoma	Rushing	Kejuan Jones	3 carries, 12 yards, 1 TD
Oklahoma	Receiving	Mark Clayton	4 receptions, 129 yards, 2 TD

=== North Texas ===
	1	2	3	4	Total
North Texas	0	7	0	0	7
Alabama	3	16	7	7	33

In the first game of the season at Bryant-Denny Stadium, The Crimson Tide would go over 500 yards of offense for the first time this season and win their first non-conference game at Bryant Denny Stadium since 1999. This game also was the first time since 1986 Alabama would not sellout their game at Bryant-Denny Stadium snapping a streak of 56 straight sellouts in Tuscaloosa.

Statistics	North Texas	Alabama
First downs	11	25
Total yards	131	534
Rushing yards	50	336
Passing yards	91	198
Turnovers	2	3
Time of possession	26:14	33:46

Team	Category	Player	Statistics
North Texas	Passing	Andrew Smith	9–18, 70 yards, 1 TD
North Texas	Rushing	Patrick Cobbs	14 carries, 58 yards
North Texas	Receiving	George Marshall	6 receptions, 39 yards, 1 TD
Alabama	Passing	Tyler Watts	12–15, 161 yards, 1 INT
Alabama	Rushing	Shaud Williams	7 carries, 101 yards, 1 TD
Alabama	Receiving	Donald Clarke	3 receptions, 80 yards

=== Southern Miss ===
	1	2	3	4	Total
Southern Miss	0	0	7	0	7
Alabama	7	7	0	6	20

For the second straight week, Alabama would hold their opponent to under 150 yards of total offense to win their third game of the season. This would be Ahmaad Galloway final game at Alabama as he would tear his ACL in the 4th quarter.

Statistics	Southern Miss	Alabama
First downs	8	20
Total yards	145	372
Rushing yards	35	351
Passing yards	110	21
Turnovers	5	3
Time of possession	20:49	39:11

Team	Category	Player	Statistics
Southern Miss	Passing	Micky D'Angelo	8–27, 110 yards, 1 INT
Southern Miss	Rushing	Derrick Nix	14 carries, 61 yards
Southern Miss	Receiving	Marvin Young	2 receptions, 35 yards
Alabama	Passing	Brodie Croyle	4–15, 15 yards, 2 INT
Alabama	Rushing	Shaud Williams	21 carries, 137 yards
Alabama	Receiving	Sam Collins	2 receptions, 10 yards

=== Arkansas ===
	1	2	3	4	Total
Alabama	14	3	3	10	30
Arkansas	0	7	3	2	12

Shaud Williams would take the opening play 80 yards for a touchdown as the Crimson Tide beat Arkansas on the road for the first time since 1996.

Statistics	Alabama	Arkansas
First downs	18	13
Total yards	552	299
Rushing yards	267	172
Passing yards	285	127
Turnovers	1	2
Time of possession	33:46	26:14

Team	Category	Player	Statistics
Alabama	Passing	Brodie Croyle	12–24, 285 yards, 2 TD
Alabama	Rushing	Santonio Beard	21 carries, 134 yards
Alabama	Receiving	Shaud Williams	2 receptions, 88 yards
Arkansas	Passing	Matt Jones	7–18, 127 yards, 2 INT
Arkansas	Rushing	Cedric Cobbs	13 carries, 70 yards
Arkansas	Receiving	George Wilson	3 receptions, 54 yards

=== Georgia ===
	1	2	3	4	Total
#7 Georgia	7	7	3	10	27
#22 Alabama	3	6	3	13	25

Georgia would use a Billy Bennett 32 yard field goal to beat Alabama in the first meeting between teams since 1995.

Statistics	Georgia	Alabama
First downs	22	16
Total yards	385	306
Rushing yards	194	133
Passing yards	224	197
Turnovers	3	2
Time of possession	30:16	29:44

Team	Category	Player	Statistics
Georgia	Passing	David Greene	15–27, 224 yards, 2 TD, 2 INT
Georgia	Rushing	Musa Smith	21 carries, 126 yards, 1 TD
Georgia	Receiving	Terrence Edwards	5 receptions, 73 yards, 1 TD
Alabama	Passing	Brodie Croyle	16–29, 197 yards, 1 TD, 1 INT
Alabama	Rushing	Ray Hudson	3 carries, 45 yards
Alabama	Receiving	Dre Fulgham	3 receptions, 63 yards, 1 TD

=== Ole Miss ===
	1	2	3	4	Total
#21 Ole Miss	7	0	0	0	7
#24 Alabama	14	7	7	14	42

Santonio Beard tied Shaun Alexander record of five rushing touchdowns in a game as Alabama dominated Ole Miss on Homecoming.

Statistics	Ole Miss	Alabama
First downs	15	18
Total yards	223	456
Rushing yards	53	265
Passing yards	219	222
Turnovers	1	1
Time of possession	31:25	28:35

Team	Category	Player	Statistics
Ole Miss	Passing	Eli Manning	18–32, 219 yards, 1 INT
Ole Miss	Rushing	Robert Williams	8 carries, 23 yards, 1 TD
Ole Miss	Receiving	Chris Collins	3 receptions, 62 yards
Alabama	Passing	Brodie Croyle	6–11, 179 yards, 1 TD
Alabama	Rushing	Santonio Beard	13 carries, 138 yards, 5 TD
Alabama	Receiving	Dre Fulgham	3 receptions, 87 yards, 1 TD

=== Tennessee ===
	1	2	3	4	Total
#19 Alabama	7	7	10	10	34
#16 Tennessee	0	7	7	0	14

For the first time since 1994, Alabama beat Tennessee snapping a seven year win streak that the Vols had. To date, this was the longest streak by any opponent over the Tide.

Statistics	Alabama	Tennessee
First downs	14	17
Total yards	300	222
Rushing yards	210	102
Passing yards	128	163
Turnovers	2	6
Time of possession	32:49	27:11

Team	Category	Player	Statistics
Alabama	Passing	Brodie Croyle	5–7, 128 yards
Alabama	Rushing	Santonio Beard	16 carries, 65 yards, 2 TD
Alabama	Receiving	Zach Fletcher	1 reception, 56 yards
Tennessee	Passing	Casey Clausen	14–26, 161 yards, 3 INT
Tennessee	Rushing	Jabari Davis	7 carries, 26 yards
Tennessee	Receiving	Tony Brown	4 receptions, 40 yards

=== Vanderbilt ===
	1	2	3	4	Total
#12 Alabama	7	6	7	10	30
Vanderbilt	0	0	0	8	8

For the second year in a row, the Crimson Tide traveled to Vanderbilt and for the 18th straight time Alabama would beat Vanderbilt. This would be the last time Alabama would play Vanderbilt until 2006 snapping a 50 consecutive seasons streak of playing.

Statistics	Alabama	Vanderbilt
First downs	24	9
Total yards	428	162
Rushing yards	157	46
Passing yards	271	116
Turnovers	0	2
Time of possession	36:22	23:38

Team	Category	Player	Statistics
Alabama	Passing	Tyler Watts	15–21, 176 yards
Alabama	Rushing	Tyler Watts	14 carries, 55 yards, 1 TD
Alabama	Receiving	Triandos Luke	9 reception, 102 yards
Vanderbilt	Passing	Jay Cutler	7–18, 116 yards, 1 TD, 1 INT
Vanderbilt	Rushing	Kwane Doster	15 carries, 33 yards
Vanderbilt	Receiving	Kwane Doster	2 receptions, 43 yards

=== Mississippi State ===
	1	2	3	4	Total
Mississippi State	3	11	0	0	14
#11 Alabama	14	7	7	0	28

Alabama used their offense in the first half and their defense in the second half to preserve second straight win against the Bulldogs for the first time since 1994–95. This game was not televised making it the first Alabama game since 1995 not to be on live television.

Statistics	Mississippi State	Alabama
First downs	17	21
Total yards	246	409
Rushing yards	107	165
Passing yards	139	244
Turnovers	2	0
Time of possession	31:19	28:41

Team	Category	Player	Statistics
Mississippi State	Passing	Kevin Fant	19–33, 127 yards, 1 TD, 1 INT
Mississippi State	Rushing	Jerious Norwood	9 carries, 58 yards
Mississippi State	Receiving	Justin Jenkins	4 receptions, 35 yards
Alabama	Passing	Tyler Watts	16–22, 223 yards, 3 TD
Alabama	Rushing	Santonio Beard	14 carries, 68 yards
Alabama	Receiving	Triandos Luke	7 receptions, 128 yards, 2 TD

=== LSU ===
	1	2	3	4	Total
#10 Alabama	0	14	0	17	31
#14 LSU	0	0	0	0	0

Alabama defense would record a shutout for the first time since 1997 as they defeated the LSU Tigers in Baton Rouge.

Statistics	Alabama	LSU
First downs	27	14
Total yards	477	196
Rushing yards	300	131
Passing yards	177	65
Turnovers	1	2
Time of possession	34:36	25:24

Team	Category	Player	Statistics
Alabama	Passing	Tyler Watts	11–20, 177 yards, 1 TD, 1 INT
Alabama	Rushing	Shaud Williams	16 carries, 131 yards
Alabama	Receiving	Sam Collins	5 reception, 115 yards
LSU	Passing	Marcus Randall	6–17, 39 yards
LSU	Rushing	Marcus Randall	6 carries, 54 yards
LSU	Receiving	Devery Henderson	3 receptions, 25 yards

=== Auburn ===
	1	2	3	4	Total
Auburn	14	3	0	0	17
#9 Alabama	0	0	7	0	7

Alabama would trail for the first time since the Georgia game earlier in the season as Auburn would upset Alabama to continue their undefeated mark in Iron Bowl's played in Tuscaloosa.

Statistics	Auburn	Alabama
First downs	14	17
Total yards	298	320
Rushing yards	129	111
Passing yards	169	209
Turnovers	1	1
Time of possession	29:43	30:17

Team	Category	Player	Statistics
Auburn	Passing	Jason Campbell	10–18, 169 yards, 2 TD, 1 INT
Auburn	Rushing	Tre Smith	25 carries, 126 yards
Auburn	Receiving	Marcel Willis	3 receptions, 59 yards
Alabama	Passing	Tyler Watts	11–21, 126 yards
Alabama	Rushing	Shaud Williams	7 carries, 48 yards
Alabama	Receiving	Dre Fulgham	2 receptions, 58 yards

=== Hawaii ===
	1	2	3	4	Total
#14 Alabama	0	14	0	7	21
Hawaii	0	0	3	13	16

Alabama reached ten wins for the first time since 1999 as Alabama beat Hawaii to end the season 10–3. This would be Dennis Franchione's last game as coach at Alabama; he left to be Texas A&M head coach on December 4, 2002.

Statistics	Alabama	Hawaii
First downs	18	21
Total yards	373	360
Rushing yards	280	−12
Passing yards	93	372
Turnovers	5	1
Time of possession	38:55	21:05

Team	Category	Player	Statistics
Alabama	Passing	Tyler Watts	8–15, 81 yards, 1 TD
Alabama	Rushing	Shaud Williams	23 carries, 160 yards, 1 TD
Alabama	Receiving	Sam Collins	3 reception, 42 yards, 1 TD
Hawaii	Passing	Timmy Chang	26–53, 373 yards, 2 TD, 4 INT
Hawaii	Rushing	Chad Kapanui	1 carry, 10 yards
Hawaii	Receiving	Jeremiah Cockheran	9 receptions, 207 yards, 1 TD

== Personnel ==
=== Coaching staff ===
Name	Position	Consecutive seasons at Alabama
Dennis Franchione	Head coach	2nd
Les Koenning	Offensive coordinator/quarterback coach	2nd
Kenith Pope	Assistant head coach/wide receivers coach	2nd
Jim Bob Helduser	Offensive line coach	2nd
Mark Tommerdahl	Special teams coordinator/tight end coach	2nd
Lee Fobbs	Running backs coach	2nd
Carl Torbush	Defensive coordinator/ Linebackers coach	2nd
Chris Thurmond	Cornerbacks coach	2nd
Melvin Smith	Safeties coach	1st
Stan Eggen	Defensive line coach	2nd

=== Roster ===
2002 Alabama Crimson Tide football team roster
Players
Coaches
Offense

Pos.	#	Name	Class
QB	14	Tyler Watts	Sr
C	51	Evan Mathis	So
C	58	Alonzo Ephraim	Sr
WR	80	Zach Fletcher	Jr
WR	84	Triandos Luke	Jr
QB	12	Brodie Croyle	Fr
WR	19	Josh Averett	So

Defense

Pos.	#	Name	Class
LB	6	Derrick Pope	Jr
LB	8	Freddie Roach	Fr
SS	10	Carlos Andrews	Jr
CB	41	Roman Harper	Fr
DE	54	Kindal Moorehead	Sr
DE	91	Chris Harris	Fr

Special teams

Pos.	#	Name	Class
PK	8	Gabe Giardina	Jr

Head coach

- Dennis Franchione

Coordinators/assistant coaches

Legend

- (C) Team captain
- (S) Suspended
- (I) Ineligible
- Injured
- Redshirt

Roster
