= 2002 South Carolina Gamecocks football team =

American college football season

2002 South Carolina Gamecocks football
- Conference: Southeastern Conference
- Eastern Division
- Record: 5–7 (3–5 SEC)
- Head coach: Lou Holtz (4th season)
- Offensive coordinator: Skip Holtz (4th season)
- Offensive scheme: Spread
- Defensive coordinator: Charlie Strong (4th season)
- Base defense: 3–3–5
- Home stadium: Williams-Brice Stadium

2002 Southeastern Conference football standings
	Conf.			Overall
Team	W		L	W		L
Eastern Division
No. 3 Georgia x$	7	–	1	13	–	1
Florida	6	–	2	8	–	5
Tennessee	5	–	3	8	–	5
Kentucky	3	–	5	7	–	5
South Carolina	3	–	5	5	–	7
Vanderbilt	0	–	8	2	–	10
Western Division
Arkansas xy	5	–	3	9	–	5
No. 14 Auburn x	5	–	3	9	–	4
LSU x	5	–	3	8	–	5
Ole Miss	3	–	5	7	–	6
Mississippi State	0	–	8	3	–	9
No. 11 ^Alabama	6	–	2	10	–	3
Championship: Georgia 30, Arkansas 3
$ – BCS representative as conference champion; x – Division champion/co-champions; y – Championship game participant; ^ – Alabama had the best division record, but did not participate in postseason play due to NCAA probation.; Rankings from AP Poll

The 2002 South Carolina Gamecocks football team represented the University of South Carolina in the Southeastern Conference (SEC) during the 2002 NCAA Division I-A football season. The Gamecocks were led by Lou Holtz in his fourth season as head coach and played their home games in Williams-Brice Stadium in Columbia, South Carolina.

In 2002, South Carolina expanded their regular season from eleven to twelve games, an allowance for every college football program that the NCAA would soon make permanent. However, the Gamecocks did not take advantage of their extra game this season, as they did not finish bowl-eligible and had their first losing season since 1999.

== Schedule ==
Date	Time	Opponent	Rank	Site	TV	Result	Attendance
August 31	7:00 pm	New Mexico State*	No. 22	Williams-Brice Stadium; Columbia, South Carolina		W 34–24	83,717
September 7	7:45 pm	at Virginia*	No. 22	Scott Stadium; Charlottesville, Virginia	ESPN	L 21–34	60,171
September 14	3:30 pm	No. 9 Georgia		Williams-Brice Stadium; Columbia, South Carolina (rivalry)	CBS	L 7–13	84,227
September 21	7:00 pm	Temple*		Williams-Brice Stadium; Columbia, South Carolina		W 42–21	81,409
September 28	7:00 pm	at Vanderbilt		Vanderbilt Stadium; Nashville, Tennessee	PPV	W 20–14	34,406
October 5	1:00 pm	Mississippi State^{†}		Williams-Brice Stadium; Columbia, South Carolina		W 34–10	80,250
October 12	6:30 pm	at Kentucky		Commonwealth Stadium; Lexington, Kentucky	ESPN2	W 16–12	70,547
October 19	7:45 pm	at No. 14 LSU		Tiger Stadium; Baton Rouge, Louisiana	ESPN2	L 14–38	91,340
November 2	3:30 pm	No. 25 Tennessee		Williams-Brice Stadium; Columbia, South Carolina (rivalry)	CBS	L 10–18	83,918
November 9	12:30 pm	Arkansas		Williams-Brice Stadium; Columbia, South Carolina	JPS	L 0–23	79,307
November 16	6:00 pm	at No. 20 Florida		Ben Hill Griffin Stadium; Gainesville, Florida	ESPN	L 7–28	85,222
November 23	7:45 pm	at Clemson*		Memorial Stadium; Clemson, South Carolina (Palmetto Bowl)	ESPN	L 20–27	83,909
*Non-conference game; ^{†}Homecoming; Rankings from AP Poll released prior to the game; All times are in Eastern time

== Roster ==
2002 South Carolina Gamecocks football team roster
Players
Coaches
Offense

Pos.	#	Name	Class
RB	4	Andrew Pinnock	Sr
QB	9	Corey Jenkins	Sr
WR	17	Mikal Goodman	Sr
OL	68	Travelle Wharton	Jr
OL	69	Stephen Sene	Fr
OL	70	Na'Shan Goddard	Fr
OL	71	Shane Hall	Sr
OL	72	Jonathan Alston	So
OL	73	Jon Hall	Fr
OL	74	John Strickland	So
OL	75	Chad Walker	So
OL	76	Cedric Williams	Sr
OL	77	Watts Sanderson	Sr
OL	78	Jabari Levey	Fr
OL	79	Josh Malloy	Fr
TE	80	Andy Boyd	Fr
WR	81	Corey Taylor	Jr
WR	82	Troy Williamson	Fr
WR	83	Chavez Donnings	Sr
WR	84	Andre Hemphill	Fr
WR	85	Michael Flint	So
WR	86	Kris Clark	Fr
TE	87	Brandon Jeffcoat	So

Defense

Pos.	#	Name	Class
S	12	Rodriques Wilson	So
LB	34	Rod Thomas	Sr
LB	44	Brett Green	Jr
LB	45	Kevin Caldwell	So
LB	46	Lenny Williams	Sr
DL	52	Brandon Miller	Fr
NT	57	Langston Moore	Sr
DE	90	Jason Capers	So
DL	91	Moe Thompson	Fr
DL	92	Eric Stroman	Fr
DE	93	Dennis Quinn	Sr
DT	94	Preston Thorne	So
DL	95	Randy Jackson	Jr
DL	96	Shaun Smith	Sr
DL	98	Chris Tucker	Fr
DE	99	George Gause	So

Special teams

Pos.	#	Name	Class
PK	97	Daniel Weaver	Jr

Head coach

- Lou Holtz

Coordinators/assistant coaches

- John Gutekunst
  (Defensive backs coach)

Legend

- (C) Team captain
- (S) Suspended
- (I) Ineligible
- Injured
- Redshirt

Roster
Last update: 2002-10-04

== Team players in the NFL ==
Player	Position	Round	Pick	NFL club
Langston Moore	Defensive tackle	6	174	Cincinnati Bengals
Corey Jenkins	Defensive back	6	181	Miami Dolphins
Andrew Pinnock	Defensive back	7	229	San Diego Chargers
