= 2002 Independence Bowl =

Nebraska Cornhuskers	Ole Miss Rebels
(7–6)	(6–6)
Big 12	SEC
23	27
Head coach: Frank Solich	Head coach: David Cutcliffe
	1	2	3	4	Total
Nebraska	3	14	3	3	23
Ole Miss	0	14	10	3	27
- Date: December 27, 2002
- Season: 2002
- Stadium: Independence Stadium
- Location: Shreveport, Louisiana
- MVP: Eli Manning; Chris Kelsay
- Favorite: Nebraska by 7
- Referee: John Smith (Big East)

United States TV coverage
- Network: ESPN
- Announcers: Jeff Hullinger, Todd Christensen, Stacy Paetz

The 2002 Independence Bowl was a post-season college football bowl game between the Nebraska Cornhuskers and the Ole Miss Rebels on December 27, 2002, at Independence Stadium in Shreveport, Louisiana. Ole Miss won the game 27–23; Ole Miss quarterback Eli Manning, who passed for 313 yards and a touchdown, was the offensive player of the game. After the loss, Nebraska finished the season 7–7, ending a forty-year streak of winning seasons for the Cornhuskers.
