= 2002 Auburn Tigers football team =

American college football season

2002 Auburn Tigers football

SEC Western Division co-champion Capital One Bowl champion

Capital One Bowl, W 13–9 vs. Penn State
- Conference: Southeastern Conference
- Western Division

Ranking
- Coaches: No. 16
- AP: No. 14
- Record: 9–4 (5–3 SEC)
- Head coach: Tommy Tuberville (4th season)
- Offensive coordinator: Bobby Petrino (1st season)
- Offensive scheme: Multiple
- Defensive coordinator: Gene Chizik (1st season)
- Base defense: 4–3
- Home stadium: Jordan–Hare Stadium

2002 Southeastern Conference football standings
	Conf.			Overall
Team	W		L	W		L
Eastern Division
No. 3 Georgia x$	7	–	1	13	–	1
Florida	6	–	2	8	–	5
Tennessee	5	–	3	8	–	5
Kentucky	3	–	5	7	–	5
South Carolina	3	–	5	5	–	7
Vanderbilt	0	–	8	2	–	10
Western Division
Arkansas xy	5	–	3	9	–	5
No. 14 Auburn x	5	–	3	9	–	4
LSU x	5	–	3	8	–	5
Ole Miss	3	–	5	7	–	6
Mississippi State	0	–	8	3	–	9
No. 11 ^Alabama	6	–	2	10	–	3
Championship: Georgia 30, Arkansas 3
$ – BCS representative as conference champion; x – Division champion/co-champions; y – Championship game participant; ^ – Alabama had the best division record, but did not participate in postseason play due to NCAA probation.; Rankings from AP Poll

The 2002 Auburn Tigers football team represented Auburn University in the 2002 NCAA Division I-A football season. Auburn, led by head coach Tommy Tuberville, finished with record of 9–4, including a 5–3 record in the Southeastern Conference. Following a disappointing 7–5 finish the previous season, the coaching staff of the 2002 Tigers featured two prominent new members. Bobby Petrino was hired as the new offensive coordinator, and Gene Chizik joined the staff as the Tigers' new defensive coordinator. Petrino left following the season to assume the head coaching job at Louisville, while Chizik remained at Auburn through the 2004 season before leaving for the defensive coordinator position at Texas. The Tigers finished the season ranked #14 in the AP Poll and #16 in the Coaches Poll.

== Schedule ==
Date	Time	Opponent	Rank	Site	TV	Result	Attendance
September 2	7:00 pm	at No. 16 USC*		Los Angeles Memorial Coliseum; Los Angeles	ABC	L 17–24	63,269
September 7	4:00 pm	Western Carolina*		Jordan–Hare Stadium; Auburn, Alabama	PPV	W 56–0	80,067
September 14	11:30 am	Vanderbilt		Jordan–Hare Stadium; Auburn, Alabama	JPS	W 31–6	76,127
September 19	6:45 pm	at Mississippi State		Davis Wade Stadium; Starkville, Mississippi	ESPN	W 42–14	52,583
September 28	8:00 pm	Syracuse*		Jordan–Hare Stadium; Auburn, Alabama	ESPN2	W 37–34 ^{3OT}	83,667
October 12	11:30 am	Arkansas	No. 24	Jordan–Hare Stadium; Auburn, Alabama	JPS	L 17–38	84,692
October 19	5:45 pm	at Florida		Ben Hill Griffin Stadium; Gainesville, Florida (rivalry)	ESPN	L 23–30 ^{OT}	85,135
October 26	11:30 am	No. 10 LSU		Jordan–Hare Stadium; Auburn, Alabama (Tiger Bowl)	JPS	W 31–7	85,366
November 2	11:30 am	at Ole Miss		Vaught–Hemingway Stadium; Oxford, Mississippi (rivalry)	JPS	W 31–24	60,635
November 9	1:00 pm	Louisiana–Monroe*^{†}		Jordan–Hare Stadium; Auburn, Alabama	PPV	W 52–14	84,618
November 16	2:30 pm	No. 7 Georgia	No. 24	Jordan–Hare Stadium; Auburn, Alabama (Deep South's Oldest Rivalry)	CBS	L 21–24	86,063
November 23	2:30 pm	at No. 9 Alabama		Bryant–Denny Stadium; Tuscaloosa, Alabama (Iron Bowl)	CBS	W 17–7	83,818
January 1	12:00 pm	vs. No. 10 Penn State*	No. 19	Florida Citrus Bowl; Orlando, Florida (Capital One Bowl)	ABC	W 13–9	66,334
*Non-conference game; ^{†}Homecoming; Rankings from AP Poll released prior to the game; All times are in Central time

== Roster ==
2002 Auburn Tigers football team roster
Players
Coaches
Offense

Pos.	#	Name	Class
WR	1	Devin Aromashodu	Fr
RB	23	Ronnie Brown	So
QB	17	Jason Campbell	So
WR	81	Jeris McIntyre	Jr
OT	73	Marcus McNeill	Fr
C	55	Ben Nowland	Sr
WR	2	Ben Obomanu	Fr
RB	24	Carnell Williams	So
WR	80	Marcel Willis	Sr

Defense

Pos.	#	Name	Class
LB	11	Karlos Dansby	Jr
DE	83	Jay Ratliff	So
DB	5	Travaris Robinson	Sr
CB	14	Carlos Rogers	So
LB	54	Dontarrious Thomas	Jr
DE	82	Reggie Torbor	Jr

Special teams

Pos.	#	Name	Class

Head coach

- Tommy Tuberville

Coordinators/assistant coaches

- OC Bobby Petrino
- DC Gene Chizik

Legend

- (C) Team captain
- (S) Suspended
- (I) Ineligible
- Injured
- Redshirt

Roster
Last update: 2022-06-15

== Captains ==
Position	Player
LB	Mark Brown
C	Ben Nowland
DB	Travaris Robinson
