= 2002 Georgia Bulldogs football team =

American college football season

2002 Georgia Bulldogs football

SEC champion SEC Eastern Division champion Sugar Bowl champion

SEC Championship Game, W 30–3 vs. Arkansas

Sugar Bowl, W 26–13 vs. Florida State
- Conference: Southeastern Conference
- Eastern Division

Ranking
- Coaches: No. 3
- AP: No. 3
- Record: 13–1 (7–1 SEC)
- Head coach: Mark Richt (2nd season)
- Offensive coordinator: Neil Callaway (2nd season)
- Offensive scheme: Pro-style
- Defensive coordinator: Brian VanGorder (2nd season)
- Base defense: 4–3
- Home stadium: Sanford Stadium

2002 Southeastern Conference football standings
	Conf.			Overall
Team	W		L	W		L
Eastern Division
No. 3 Georgia x$	7	–	1	13	–	1
Florida	6	–	2	8	–	5
Tennessee	5	–	3	8	–	5
Kentucky	3	–	5	7	–	5
South Carolina	3	–	5	5	–	7
Vanderbilt	0	–	8	2	–	10
Western Division
Arkansas xy	5	–	3	9	–	5
No. 14 Auburn x	5	–	3	9	–	4
LSU x	5	–	3	8	–	5
Ole Miss	3	–	5	7	–	6
Mississippi State	0	–	8	3	–	9
No. 11 ^Alabama	6	–	2	10	–	3
Championship: Georgia 30, Arkansas 3
$ – BCS representative as conference champion; x – Division champion/co-champions; y – Championship game participant; ^ – Alabama had the best division record, but did not participate in postseason play due to NCAA probation.; Rankings from AP Poll

The 2002 Georgia Bulldogs football team represented the University of Georgia as a member of the Southeastern Conference (SEC) during the 2002 NCAA Division I-A football season. Led by second-year head coach Mark Richt, the Bulldogs compiled an overall record of 13–1 with a mark of 7–1 in conference play, winning the SEC's Eastern Division. Georgia won the SEC title for the first time since the 1982 season with a 30–3 win over Arkansas in the SEC Championship Game. The Bulldogs finished the season with a 26–13 win in the Sugar Bowl over Florida State and earned a No. 3 final ranking both in the AP poll and the Coaches Poll. The team played home games at Sanford Stadium in Athens, Georgia.

== Schedule ==
Date	Time	Opponent	Rank	Site	TV	Result	Attendance
August 31	7:45 p.m.	Clemson*	No. 8	Sanford Stadium; Athens, GA (rivalry)	ESPN	W 31–28	86,520
September 14	3:30 p.m.	at South Carolina	No. 9	Williams–Brice Stadium; Columbia, SC (rivalry)	CBS	W 13–7	84,227
September 21	1:00 p.m.	No. 10 (I-AA) Northwestern State*	No. 8	Sanford Stadium; Athens, GA		W 45–7	86,520
September 28	1:00 p.m.	New Mexico State*	No. 8	Sanford Stadium; Athens, GA		W 41–10	86,520
October 5	3:30 p.m.	at No. 22 Alabama	No. 7	Bryant–Denny Stadium; Tuscaloosa, AL (rivalry, College GameDay)	CBS	W 27–25	83,818
October 12	3:30 p.m.	No. 10 Tennessee	No. 6	Sanford Stadium; Athens, GA (rivalry)	CBS	W 18–13	86,520
October 19	12:30 p.m.	Vanderbilt^{†}	No. 5	Sanford Stadium; Athens, GA (rivalry)	JPS	W 48–17	86,520
October 26	3:30 p.m.	at Kentucky	No. 5	Commonwealth Stadium; Lexington, KY	CBS	W 52–24	71,017
November 2	7:45 p.m.	vs. Florida	No. 5	Alltel Stadium; Jacksonville, FL (rivalry, College GameDay)	ESPN	L 13–20	84,433
November 9	7:00 p.m.	Ole Miss	No. 7	Sanford Stadium; Athens, GA	ESPN2	W 31–17	86,520
November 16	3:30 p.m.	at No. 24 Auburn	No. 7	Jordan–Hare Stadium; Auburn, AL (Deep South's Oldest Rivalry)	CBS	W 24–21	86,063
November 30	3:30 p.m.	Georgia Tech*	No. 5	Sanford Stadium; Athens, GA (Clean, Old-Fashioned Hate)	CBS	W 51–7	86,520
December 7	6:00 p.m.	vs. No. 22 Arkansas	No. 4	Georgia Dome; Atlanta, GA (SEC Championship Game)	CBS	W 30–3	74,835
January 1, 2003	8:30 p.m.	vs. No. 16 Florida State*	No. 4	Louisiana Superdome; New Orleans, LA (Sugar Bowl)	ABC	W 26–13	74,269
*Non-conference game; ^{†}Homecoming; Rankings from AP Poll released prior to the game; All times are in Eastern time

== Game summaries ==
=== Auburn ===
#7 Georgia at Auburn

Team	1	2	3	4	Total
• Georgia	3	0	14	7	24
Auburn	7	7	7	0	21

- Date: November 16
- Location: Jordan–Hare Stadium, Auburn, Alabama
- Source: USA Today

Scoring summary
1		AUB	Brown 53 yard run (Duval kick)	AUB 7–0
1		UGA	Bennett 43 yard field goal	AUB 7–3
2		AUB	B. Johnson 2 yard pass from Campbell (Duval kick)	AUB 14–3
3		UGA	Greene 1 yard run (Kilgo kick)	AUB 14–10
3		AUB	Campbell 21 yard run (Duval kick)	AUB 21–10
3		UGA	Stinchcomb recovered fumble in end zone (Bennett kick)	AUB 21–17
4	1:25	UGA	M. Johnson 19 yard pass from Greene (Bennett kick)	UGA 24–21

- Georgia clinches SEC East

== Roster ==
2002 Georgia Bulldogs football team roster
Players
Coaches
Offense

Pos.	#	Name	Class
OL	70	Kevin Breedlove	Sr
WR	1	Reggie Brown	So
OT	71	George Foster	Sr
QB	11	David Greene	So
QB	3	D. J. Shockley	Fr
OT	78	Jon Stinchcomb	Sr
FB	49	J. T. Wall	Sr

Defense

Pos.	#	Name	Class
LB	45	Boss Bailey	Sr
LB	42	Tony Gilbert	Sr
CB	23	Tim Jennings	Fr
DB	6	Sean Jones	Jr
DE	47	David Pollack	So
DT	57	Johnathan Sullivan	Jr

Special teams

Pos.	#	Name	Class
P	83	Jonathan Kilgo	Sr

Head coach

- Mark Richt

Coordinators/assistant coaches

Legend

- (C) Team captain
- (S) Suspended
- (I) Ineligible
- Injured
- Redshirt

Roster
