= 2002 LSU Tigers football team =

American college football season

2002 LSU Tigers football

SEC Western Division co-champion

Cotton Bowl Classic, L 20–35 vs. Texas
- Conference: Southeastern Conference
- Western Division
- Record: 8–5 (5–3 SEC)
- Head coach: Nick Saban (3rd season)
- Offensive coordinator: Jimbo Fisher (3rd season)
- Offensive scheme: Pro-style
- Defensive coordinator: Will Muschamp (1st season)
- Base defense: 4–3
- Home stadium: Tiger Stadium

2002 Southeastern Conference football standings
	Conf.			Overall
Team	W		L	W		L
Eastern Division
No. 3 Georgia x$	7	–	1	13	–	1
Florida	6	–	2	8	–	5
Tennessee	5	–	3	8	–	5
Kentucky	3	–	5	7	–	5
South Carolina	3	–	5	5	–	7
Vanderbilt	0	–	8	2	–	10
Western Division
Arkansas xy	5	–	3	9	–	5
No. 14 Auburn x	5	–	3	9	–	4
LSU x	5	–	3	8	–	5
Ole Miss	3	–	5	7	–	6
Mississippi State	0	–	8	3	–	9
No. 11 ^Alabama	6	–	2	10	–	3
Championship: Georgia 30, Arkansas 3
$ – BCS representative as conference champion; x – Division champion/co-champions; y – Championship game participant; ^ – Alabama had the best division record, but did not participate in postseason play due to NCAA probation.; Rankings from AP Poll

The 2002 LSU Tigers football team represented Louisiana State University in the 2002 NCAA Division I-A football season. Coached by Nick Saban, the Tigers played their home games at Tiger Stadium in Baton Rouge, Louisiana. The defending SEC champion Tigers started out strong, but an injury to starting quarterback Matt Mauck hurt the team and they lost four of their final six games. The season is memorable because of the famous Bluegrass Miracle against the Kentucky Wildcats.

== Schedule ==
Date	Time	Opponent	Rank	Site	TV	Result	Attendance
September 1	1:30 p.m.	at No. 16 Virginia Tech*	No. 14	Lane Stadium; Blacksburg, VA	ABC	L 8–26	65,049
September 7	7:00 p.m.	The Citadel*	No. 23	Tiger Stadium; Baton Rouge, LA		W 35–10	85,022
September 14	7:00 p.m.	Miami (OH)*	No. 22	Tiger Stadium; Baton Rouge, LA		W 33–7	90,010
September 28	11:30 a.m.	Mississippi State	No. 20	Tiger Stadium; Baton Rouge, LA (rivalry)	JPS	W 31–13	90,793
October 5	7:00 p.m.	Louisiana–Lafayette*^{†}	No. 19	Tiger Stadium; Baton Rouge, LA	PPV	W 48–0	91,357
October 12	6:45 p.m.	at No. 16 Florida	No. 18	Ben Hill Griffin Stadium; Gainesville, FL (rivalry)	ESPN	W 36–7	85,252
October 19	6:45 p.m.	South Carolina	No. 12	Tiger Stadium; Baton Rouge, LA	ESPN	W 38–14	91,340
October 26	11:30 a.m.	at Auburn	No. 10	Jordan–Hare Stadium; Auburn, AL (Tiger Bowl)	JPS	L 7–31	85,366
November 9	11:30 a.m.	at Kentucky	No. 16	Commonwealth Stadium; Lexington, KY (Bluegrass Miracle)	JPS	W 33–30	66,262
November 16	8:00 p.m.	No. 10 Alabama	No. 12	Tiger Stadium; Baton Rouge, LA (rivalry)	ESPN	L 0–31	92,012
November 23	7:30 p.m.	Ole Miss	No. 21	Tiger Stadium; Baton Rouge, LA (Magnolia Bowl)	ESPN2	W 14–13	91,613
November 29	1:30 p.m.	at Arkansas	No. 17	War Memorial Stadium; Little Rock, AR (Battle for the Golden Boot)	CBS	L 20–21	55,553
January 1, 2003	10:00 a.m.	vs. No. 9 Texas*		Cotton Bowl; Dallas, TX (Cotton Bowl Classic)	FOX	L 20–35	70,817
*Non-conference game; ^{†}Homecoming; Rankings from AP Poll released prior to the game; All times are in Central time

== Roster ==
2002 LSU Tigers football team roster
Players
Coaches
Offense

Pos.	#	Name	Class
WR	5	Skyler Green	Fr
WR	9	Devery Henderson	Jr
RB	10	Joseph Addai	So
QB	12	Marcus Randall	So
WR	14	Michael Clayton	So
QB	18	Matt Mauck	So
RB	22	LaBrandon Toefield	Sr
RB	31	Domanick Davis	Sr
TE	47	Eric Edwards	Jr
C	55	Ben Wilkerson	So
OL	64	Rudy Niswanger	Fr
G	73	Rob Sale	Sr
WR	87	Blain Bech	So

Defense

Pos.	#	Name	Class
DB	8	Jack Hunt	Jr
LB	11	Bradie James	Sr
CB	13	Corey Webster	So
CB	21	Randall Gay	Jr
LB	27	Eric Alexander	Jr
DE	84	Marcus Spears	So
DT	93	Chad Lavalais	Jr
DT	95	Kyle Williams	Fr

Special teams

Pos.	#	Name	Class
K	40	John Corbello	Sr
P	80	Donnie Jones	Jr

Head coach

- Nick Saban

Coordinators/assistant coaches

- Assistant Head Coach/Linebackers-Kirk Doll
- Offensive Coordinator/Quarterbacks-Jimbo Fisher
- Running Backs/Special Teams Coordinator-Michael Haywood
- Offensive Line-George Yarno
- Wide Receivers-Stan Hixon
- Tight Ends-Derek Dooley
- Defensive Coordinator -Will Muschamp
- Defensive Line-Lance Thompson
- Defensive Backs- Charlie Harbison
- Defensive Graduate Assistant - Jay Rodgers
- Graduate Assistant - Adam Gase
- Graduate Assistant - Scott Cochran
- Strength and Conditioning assistant - Bo Davis

Legend

- (C) Team captain
- (S) Suspended
- (I) Ineligible
- Injured
- Redshirt

Roster

== LSU Tigers in the 2003 NFL draft ==
Player	Position	Round	Pick	Overall	NFL team
Domanick Davis	Running back	4	4	101	Houston Texans
Bradie James	Linebacker	4	6	103	Dallas Cowboys
LaBrandon Toefield	Running back	4	35	132	Jacksonville Jaguars
Norman Lejeune	Defensive back	7	30	244	Philadelphia Eagles
