= 2002 SEC Championship Game =

- Conference Championship
- 2002 SEC Championship logo
Arkansas Razorbacks	Georgia Bulldogs
(9–3)	(11–1)
3	30
Head coach: Houston Nutt	Head coach: Mark Richt
AP / Coaches / BCS; 22 / 22 / NR	AP / Coaches / BCS; 4 / 4 / 3
	1	2	3	4	Total
Arkansas	0	0	3	0	3
Georgia	17	0	6	7	30
- Date: December 7, 2002
- Season: 2002
- Stadium: Georgia Dome
- Location: Atlanta, Georgia
- MVP: RB Musa Smith, Georgia
- Favorite: Georgia by 8
- Referee: Penn Wagers
- Attendance: 74,913

United States TV coverage
- Network: CBS
- Announcers: Verne Lundquist (play-by-play); Todd Blackledge (color); Jill Arrington (sideline)

2002 Southeastern Conference football standings
	Conf.			Overall
Team	W		L	W		L
Eastern Division
No. 3 Georgia x$	7	–	1	13	–	1
Florida	6	–	2	8	–	5
Tennessee	5	–	3	8	–	5
Kentucky	3	–	5	7	–	5
South Carolina	3	–	5	5	–	7
Vanderbilt	0	–	8	2	–	10
Western Division
Arkansas xy	5	–	3	9	–	5
No. 14 Auburn x	5	–	3	9	–	4
LSU x	5	–	3	8	–	5
Ole Miss	3	–	5	7	–	6
Mississippi State	0	–	8	3	–	9
No. 11 ^Alabama	6	–	2	10	–	3
Championship: Georgia 30, Arkansas 3
$ – BCS representative as conference champion; x – Division champion/co-champions; y – Championship game participant; ^ – Alabama had the best division record, but did not participate in postseason play due to NCAA probation.; Rankings from AP Poll

The 2002 SEC Championship Game was won by the Georgia Bulldogs 30–3 over the Arkansas Razorbacks. The game was played in the Georgia Dome in Atlanta on December 7, 2002 and was televised to a national audience on CBS.

The 2002 championship game was unusual in the fact that team in first place in the Western Division did not play in the game. The Alabama Crimson Tide finished with the best SEC record in the Western Division, but could not participate in the conference championship game due to an NCAA probation stipulation which banned the team from any post season play. Instead, the Arkansas Razorbacks who finished in a three way tie for second represented the Western Division after winning the tie breaker over Auburn and LSU. This was not the first time the SEC West leader was excluded from the game. Auburn also finished atop the West in 1993, but was banned from post season play as well by NCAA probation.
