= 2002 Ole Miss Rebels football team =

American college football season

2002 Ole Miss Rebels football

Independence Bowl champion

Independence Bowl, W 27–23 vs. Nebraska
- Conference: Southeastern Conference
- Western Division
- Record: 7–6 (3–5 SEC)
- Head coach: David Cutcliffe (4th season)
- Offensive coordinator: John Latina (3rd season)
- Offensive scheme: Pro-style
- Defensive coordinator: Chuck Driesbach (1st season)
- Base defense: 3–4
- Home stadium: Vaught–Hemingway Stadium

2002 Southeastern Conference football standings
	Conf.			Overall
Team	W		L	W		L
Eastern Division
No. 3 Georgia x$	7	–	1	13	–	1
Florida	6	–	2	8	–	5
Tennessee	5	–	3	8	–	5
Kentucky	3	–	5	7	–	5
South Carolina	3	–	5	5	–	7
Vanderbilt	0	–	8	2	–	10
Western Division
Arkansas xy	5	–	3	9	–	5
No. 14 Auburn x	5	–	3	9	–	4
LSU x	5	–	3	8	–	5
Ole Miss	3	–	5	7	–	6
Mississippi State	0	–	8	3	–	9
No. 11 ^Alabama	6	–	2	10	–	3
Championship: Georgia 30, Arkansas 3
$ – BCS representative as conference champion; x – Division champion/co-champions; y – Championship game participant; ^ – Alabama had the best division record, but did not participate in postseason play due to NCAA probation.; Rankings from AP Poll

The 2002 Ole Miss Rebels football team represented the University of Mississippi during the 2002 NCAA Division I-A football season. The team participated as members of the Southeastern Conference in the West Division. Coached by David Cutcliffe, the Rebels played their home games at Vaught–Hemingway Stadium in Oxford, Mississippi.

== Schedule ==
Date	Time	Opponent	Rank	Site	TV	Result	Attendance
August 31	6:00 pm	Louisiana–Monroe*		Vaught–Hemingway Stadium; Oxford, MS		W 31–3	58,151
September 7	11:30 am	Memphis*		Vaught–Hemingway Stadium; Oxford, MS (rivalry)	JPS	W 38–16	54,718
September 14	2:30 pm	at Texas Tech*		Jones SBC Stadium; Lubbock, TX	ABC	L 28–42	40,228
September 21	11:30 am	Vanderbilt		Vaught–Hemingway Stadium; Oxford, MS (rivalry)	JPS	W 45–38	50,427
October 5	11:00 am	No. 6 Florida		Vaught–Hemingway Stadium; Oxford, MS	CBS	W 17–14	61,140
October 12	1:00 pm	Arkansas State*^{†}	No. 25	Vaught–Hemingway Stadium; Oxford, MS		W 52–17	55,204
October 19	2:30 pm	at No. 24 Alabama	No. 21	Bryant–Denny Stadium; Tuscaloosa, AL (rivalry)	CBS	L 7–42	83,818
October 26	1:00 pm	at Arkansas		Donald W. Reynolds Razorback Stadium; Fayetteville, AR (rivalry)		L 28–48	71,723
November 2	11:30 am	Auburn		Vaught–Hemingway Stadium; Oxford, MS (rivalry)	JPS	L 24–31	60,635
November 9	6:00 pm	at No. 7 Georgia		Sanford Stadium; Athens, GA	ESPN2	L 17–31	86,520
November 23	7:30 pm	at No. 21 LSU		Tiger Stadium; Baton Rouge, LA (rivalry)	ESPN2	L 13–14	91,613
November 28	6:45 pm	Mississippi State		Vaught–Hemingway Stadium; Oxford, MS (Egg Bowl)	ESPN	W 24–12	60,245
December 27	4:30 pm	vs. Nebraska*		Independence Stadium; Shreveport, LA (Independence Bowl)	ESPN	W 27–23	46,096
*Non-conference game; ^{†}Homecoming; Rankings from AP Poll released prior to the game; All times are in Central time

== Roster ==
2002 Ole Miss Rebels football team roster
Players
Coaches
Offense

Pos.	#	Name	Class
WR	9	Jason Armstead	Sr
QB	10	Eli Manning	Jr
OL	73	Chris Spencer	Fr

Defense

Pos.	#	Name	Class
LB	1	Eddie Strong	Sr
LB	51	Justin Wade	Jr
DT	67	Stacy Andrews	Jr
DL	99	Josh Cooper	So

Special teams

Pos.	#	Name	Class

Head coach

- David Cutcliffe

Coordinators/assistant coaches

- Mike MacIntyre – Defensive backs

Legend

- (C) Team captain
- (S) Suspended
- (I) Ineligible
- Injured
- Redshirt

Roster
Last update: 2002-10-13
