= Fred Talley =

American football player (born 1980)

Profile
- Position: Running back

Personal information
- Born: November 6, 1980 (age 46); Longview, Texas
- Listed height: 5 ft 7.5 in (1.71 m)
- Listed weight: 180 lb (82 kg)

Career information
- High school: Longview (Longview, Texas)
- College: Arkansas Razorbacks (1999–2002)

Awards and highlights
- First-team All-SEC (2002); Second-team All-SEC (2001)

Fred Talley (born November 6, 1980) is an American football running back. He played collegiately for the Arkansas Razorbacks from 1999-2002.

== Career ==
=== College ===
Fred Talley was a tailback in Longview, Texas, where he played for Robert Bero, former coach of the Longview High School Lobos, leading his high school team to a state runner-up finish and a #3 national ranking as a junior.

Originally signed by the University of Arkansas as a defensive back, Talley was later moved to running back where he had a very productive career. As a sophomore in 2000, Talley rushed 768 yards and five touchdowns despite playing in only eight games, helping the Razorbacks reach the Las Vegas Bowl. He was named Second Team All-SEC by the coaches in 2001 after running for 774 yards and four touchdowns. The Razorbacks later faced the Oklahoma Sooners in the Cotton Bowl Classic, losing 10-3.

Talley rushed for 1119 yards as a senior in 2002, averaging 5.7 yards per carry. Half of Talley's season total was gained during a three-game stretch against Auburn (241 yards), Kentucky (182 yards), and Ole Miss (136 yards). Talley's rushing yardage against Auburn is the third-highest in school history, behind Darren McFadden and Dickey Morton. In the Razorbacks 2002 season finale, Talley rushed for 118 yards and a touchdown against LSU. Arkansas won the game, nicknamed the "Miracle on Markham," by a score of 21-20, propelling them to the SEC Championship Game, which they lost to the University of Georgia 30-3. Talley was also voted First Team All-SEC by the coaches and Second Team by the Associated Press in 2002.

For his career, Talley ran for 2661 yards (5.3 avg.) and eleven touchdowns. He rushed for 100 yards or more in a game eleven times, including two 200-yard games.

=== Professional career ===
Talley was not selected in the 2003 NFL draft, but was signed as a free agent by the Atlanta Falcons. Talley was released during training camp. Talley also had free agent contracts with the Canadian Football League's Edmonton Eskimos in 2004 and the Montreal Alouettes for the 2005 season, but was released in the pre-season each time.
