= Rushen Jones =

American football player (born 1980)

No. 31
- Position: Cornerback

Personal information
- Born: April 4, 1980 (age 46); Lake Forest, Illinois
- Listed height: 5 ft 10 in (1.78 m)
- Listed weight: 194 lb (88 kg)

Career information
- High school: Whitehaven (TN)
- College: Vanderbilt
- NFL draft: 2003: undrafted

Career history
- Minnesota Vikings (2003–2004)

Career NFL statistics
- Games played: 16
- Stats at Pro Football Reference

Rushen R. Jones (born April 4, 1980) is an American former professional football player who was a cornerback for the Minnesota Vikings of the National Football League (NFL). He played college football for the Vanderbilt Commodores.
