= Julian Battle =

American gridiron football player (born 1981)

No. 26
- Position: Defensive back

Personal information
- Born: July 11, 1981 (age 45); Royal Palm Beach, Florida, U.S.
- Listed height: 6 ft 2 in (1.88 m)
- Listed weight: 205 lb (93 kg)

Career information
- College: Tennessee Volunteers
- NFL draft: 2003: 3rd round, 92nd overall pick

Career history
- Kansas City Chiefs (2003–2005); Washington Redskins (2006)*; Calgary Stampeders (2007–2008)
- * Offseason or practice squad member only

Awards and highlights
- Grey Cup champion (2008); First-team All-SEC (2002)
- Stats at Pro Football Reference
- Stats at CFL.ca (archive)

Julian Battle (born July 11, 1981) is an American former professional football defensive back. He was selected by the Kansas City Chiefs in the third round of the 2003 NFL draft. He played college football for the Tennessee Volunteers.

Battle was also a member of the Washington Redskins and Calgary Stampeders.

== Early life ==
Battle played high school football at Wellington Community High School.

== College career ==
He originally signed with the University of Miami out of high school and didn't qualify and attended junior college. He was a two-year letterman at Los Angeles Valley College before transferring to the University of Tennessee where he started all 26 games, producing 132 tackles, seven tackles for loss, two sacks, 13 passes defensed, three fumble recoveries, three forced fumbles, one touchdown, and blocked two punts.

== Professional career ==
=== Kansas City Chiefs ===
Battle was selected by the Kansas City Chiefs in the third round, with the 92nd overall pick, of the 2003 NFL draft by the Kansas City Chiefs. He played in the regular season with the Chiefs as a safety for two seasons from 2003 to 2004. He was waived/injured on July 28, 2005, and reverted to injured reserve the next day. Battle was waived by the Chiefs on August 10, 2006.

=== Washington Redskins ===
Battle signed with the Washington Redskins on August 16, 2006. He was waived on September 2, 2006.

=== Calgary Stampeders ===
He signed with the Calgary Stampeders on September 12, 2007. He helped Calgary win the 96th Grey Cup in the 2008 CFL season.
