= Andrew Pinnock =

American football player (born 1980)

No. 30, 34, 38
- Position: Fullback

Personal information
- Born: March 12, 1980 (age 46); Hartford, Connecticut, U.S.
- Listed height: 5 ft 10 in (1.78 m)
- Listed weight: 250 lb (113 kg)

Career information
- High school: Bloomfield (Bloomfield, Connecticut)
- College: South Carolina
- NFL draft: 2003: 7th round, 229th overall pick

Career history
- San Diego Chargers (2003–2007); Denver Broncos (2008); Florida Tuskers (2009)

Career NFL statistics
- Rushing attempts: 18
- Rushing yards: 56
- Receptions: 4
- Receiving yards: 31
- Stats at Pro Football Reference

Andrew Pinnock (born March 12, 1980) is an American former professional football player who was a fullback in the National Football League (NFL). He played college football for the South Carolina Gamecocks and was selected by the San Diego Chargers in the seventh round of the 2003 NFL draft.

Pinnock also played for the Denver Broncos and Florida Tuskers.

== Early life ==
Pinnock attended Bloomfield High School in Bloomfield, Connecticut, and was a letterman in football. As a senior, he was named the 1998 Mr. Football for the state of Connecticut, and also won All-State and All-District honors. 1998. While there, he was a teammate of the Indianapolis Colts defensive end, Dwight Freeney.

== College career ==
Pinnock played college football at the University of South Carolina for legendary coach Lou Holtz where he was a standout running back/fullback from 1999-2003.

== Professional career ==
=== San Diego Chargers ===
Pinnock was selected by the San Diego Chargers in the seventh round (229th overall) of the 2003 NFL draft. He then served as a special team player and backup to Pro Bowler Lorenzo Neal. He was released on September 1, 2008.

=== Denver Broncos ===
Pinnock was signed by the Denver Broncos on November 26, 2008. He was released on April 29, 2009.

=== Florida Tuskers ===
Pinnock played in six games, starting five, for the Florida Tuskers in 2009. He caught five passes for 17 yards and one touchdown and rushed four times for five yards and one touchdown. He also recorded one solo tackle and one assisted tackle.
