= 2002 Mississippi State Bulldogs football team =

American college football season

2002 Mississippi State Bulldogs football
- Conference: Southeastern Conference
- Western Division
- Record: 3–9 (0–8 SEC)
- Head coach: Jackie Sherrill (12th season)
- Offensive coordinator: Sparky Woods (4th season)
- Offensive scheme: Multiple I formation
- Defensive coordinator: Joe Lee Dunn (7th season)
- Base defense: 3–3 stack
- Home stadium: Davis Wade Stadium

2002 Southeastern Conference football standings
	Conf.			Overall
Team	W		L	W		L
Eastern Division
No. 3 Georgia x$	7	–	1	13	–	1
Florida	6	–	2	8	–	5
Tennessee	5	–	3	8	–	5
Kentucky	3	–	5	7	–	5
South Carolina	3	–	5	5	–	7
Vanderbilt	0	–	8	2	–	10
Western Division
Arkansas xy	5	–	3	9	–	5
No. 14 Auburn x	5	–	3	9	–	4
LSU x	5	–	3	8	–	5
Ole Miss	3	–	5	7	–	6
Mississippi State	0	–	8	3	–	9
No. 11 ^Alabama	6	–	2	10	–	3
Championship: Georgia 30, Arkansas 3
$ – BCS representative as conference champion; x – Division champion/co-champions; y – Championship game participant; ^ – Alabama had the best division record, but did not participate in postseason play due to NCAA probation.; Rankings from AP Poll

The 2002 Mississippi State Bulldogs football team represented Mississippi State University as a member of the Western Division of the Southern Conference (SEC) during the 2002 NCAA Division I-A football season. Led by 12th-year head coach Jackie Sherrill, the Bulldogs compiled an overall record of 3–9 with a mark of 0–8 in conference play, placing last out of six teams in the SEC's Western Division. Mississippi State played home games at Davis Wade Stadium in Starkville, Mississippi.

== Schedule ==
Date	Time	Opponent	Site	TV	Result	Attendance	Source
August 31	5:00 pm	at No. 15 Oregon*	Autzen Stadium; Eugene, OR	FSN	L 13–36	56,386	
September 14	6:00 pm	No. 24 (I-AA) Jacksonville State*	Davis Wade Stadium; Starkville, MS		W 51–13	47,456	
September 19	6:45 pm	Auburn	Davis Wade Stadium; Starkville, MS	ESPN	L 14–42	52,583	
September 28	11:30 am	at No. 22 LSU	Tiger Stadium; Baton Rouge, Louisiana (rivalry)	JPS	L 13–31	90,793	
October 5	12:00 pm	at South Carolina	Williams–Brice Stadium; Columbia, SC		L 10–34	80,250	
October 12	1:30 pm	Troy State*^{†}	Davis Wade Stadium; Starkville, MS		W 11–8	49,546	
October 19	7:00 pm	at Memphis*	Liberty Bowl Memorial Stadium; Memphis, TN		W 29–17	28,209	
November 2	1:30 pm	Kentucky	Davis Wade Stadium; Starkville, MS	PPV	L 24–45	45,248	
November 9	1:00 pm	at No. 11 Alabama	Bryant–Denny Stadium; Tuscaloosa, AL (rivalry)	PPV	L 14–28	83,818	
November 16	11:30 am	Tennessee	Davis Wade Stadium; Starkville, MS	JPS	L 17–35	54,807	
November 23	1:30 pm	Arkansas	Davis Wade Stadium; Starkville, MS		L 19–26	40,108	
November 28	6:45 pm	at Ole Miss	Vaught–Hemingway Stadium; Oxford, MS (Egg Bowl)	ESPN	L 12–24	60,245	
*Non-conference game; ^{†}Homecoming; Rankings from AP Poll released prior to the game; All times are in Central time
