= Derek Abney =

American football player (born 1980)

No. 12, 25
- Position: Wide receiver / Kick returner

Personal information
- Born: December 19, 1980 (age 45); Minot, North Dakota, U.S.
- Listed height: 5 ft 10 in (1.78 m)
- Listed weight: 175 lb (79 kg)

Career information
- High school: Everest (Weston, Wisconsin)
- College: Kentucky
- NFL draft: 2004: 7th round, 244th overall pick

Career history
- Baltimore Ravens (2004); Chicago Bears (2005)*; Detroit Lions (2005)*
- * Offseason or practice squad member only

Awards and highlights
- Consensus All-American (2002); Second-team All-American (2003); 3× First-team All-SEC (2001, 2002, 2003)

Derek Allen Abney (born December 19, 1980) is an American former college football player who was a wide receiver for the Kentucky Wildcats. He earned consensus All-American honors as a kick returner in 2002. He never played in a regular season game in the National Football League (NFL) after being selected by the Baltimore Ravens in the seventh round of the 2004 NFL draft.

== Early life ==
Abney was born in Minot, North Dakota. He attended D.C. Everest High School in Schofield, Wisconsin, where he played wide receiver for the Evergreens high school football team. He led the Evergreens to a 14–0 record and a Division 1 state title his senior season. He caught 62 passes for 1,309 yards and 14 touchdowns. Abney was also received first-team all-state honors in both his junior and senior seasons. He was voted to the second-team following his sophomore season.

== College career ==
While attending the University of Kentucky, Abney was a wide receiver and kick returner for the Kentucky Wildcats football team from 2000 to 2003. Abney left Kentucky with the second-most receiving yards in team history, and the second-most all-purpose yards in Southeastern Conference (SEC) history. In addition to being recognized as a consensus first-team All-American as a junior in 2002, he was also a first-team All-SEC selection in 2002 and 2003.

== Professional career ==
Abney was selected in the seventh round (244th pick overall) of the 2004 NFL draft by the Baltimore Ravens, but he was released without playing in a regular season game. Abney was signed by the Chicago Bears in the 2005 offseason, but again did not appear in a regular season game. After retiring from football, he began working as a civil engineer and is now a licensed professional engineer in South Carolina.
