= Kevin Fant =

American football player (born 1980)

No. 16
- Position: Quarterback

Personal information
- Born: October 24, 1980 (age 46); Pascagoula, Mississippi, U.S.

Career information
- High school: Moss Point High School
- College: Mississippi State (2000–2003)

Kevin Fant (born October 24, 1980) is an American former football quarterback. He was the starting quarterback for the Mississippi State Bulldogs in 2001, 2002, and 2003.

Fant was controversially suspended by the NCAA for the 2002 season opener against Oregon after a family friend and Mississippi State temporarily paid for new tires for Fant until Fant's mother paid him back later that day. In the school's athletic record book, Fant's 5,631 passing yards and 33 passing touchdowns rank third and fifth, respectively. He now the coaches at Vancleave High School in Mississippi.
