= 2002–03 NCAA football bowl games =

College football postseason game series

- Season: 2002
- Number of bowls: 28
- All-star games: 5
- Bowl games: December 17, 2002 – January 3, 2003
- National Championship: 2003 Fiesta Bowl
- Location of Championship: Sun Devil Stadium, Tempe, Arizona
- Champions: Ohio State Buckeyes
- Bowl Challenge Cup winner: Big Ten
Bowl record by conference
Conference	Bowls	Record	Number of teams in final AP poll
Big 12	8	5–3 (0.625)	4
ACC	7	4–3 (0.571)	4
Big Ten	7	5–2 (0.714)	4
Pac-10	7	2–5 (0.286)	2
SEC	7	3–4 (0.429)	3
Big East	5	3–2 (0.600)	4
Conference USA	5	2–3 (0.400)	1
Mountain West	3	0–3 (0.000)	0
WAC	3	2–1 (0.667)	1
MAC	2	1–1 (0.500)	1
Sun Belt	1	1–0 (1.000)	0
Independents	1	0–1 (0.000)	1

The 2002–03 NCAA football bowl games were a series of 28 post-season games (including the Bowl Championship Series) played in December 2002 and January 2003 for Division I-A football teams and their all-stars. The post-season began with the New Orleans Bowl on December 17, 2002, and concluded on February 1, 2003, with the season-ending Hula Bowl.

A new record of 28 team-competitive bowls, and two all-star games, were played, including the inaugural Continental Tire Bowl, Hawaii Bowl and San Francisco Bowl. To fill the 56 available team-competitive bowl slots, a total of three teams with non-winning seasons participated in bowl games—all three had a .500 (6–6) season.

== Poll rankings ==
The below table lists top teams (per polls taken after the completion of the regular season and any conference championship games), their win–loss records (prior to bowl games), and the bowls they later played in. The AP column represents rankings per the AP Poll, while the BCS column represents the Bowl Championship Series rankings.

AP	BCS	Team	W–L	Bowl
1	1	Miami Hurricanes	12–0	Fiesta Bowl †
2	2	Ohio State Buckeyes	13–0	Fiesta Bowl †
3	5	Iowa Hawkeyes	11–1	Orange Bowl †
4	3	Georgia Bulldogs	12–1	Sugar Bowl †
5	4	USC Trojans	10–2	Orange Bowl †
6	8	Kansas State Wildcats	10–2	Holiday Bowl
7	6	Washington State Cougars	10–2	Rose Bowl †
8	7	Oklahoma Sooners	11–2	Rose Bowl †
9	10	Texas Longhorns	10–2	Cotton Bowl Classic
10	12	Penn State Nittany Lions	9–3	Capital One Bowl
11	9	Notre Dame Fighting Irish	10–2	Gator Bowl
12	11	Michigan Wolverines	9–3	Outback Bowl
13	—	Alabama Crimson Tide	10–3	none ‡
14	13	Colorado Buffaloes	9–4	Alamo Bowl
15	15	West Virginia Mountaineers	9–3	Continental Tire Bowl
16	14	Florida State Seminoles	9–4	Sugar Bowl †
17	—	NC State Wolfpack	10–3	Gator Bowl
18	—	Boise State Broncos	11–1	Humanitarian Bowl
19	—	Auburn Tigers	8–4	Capital One Bowl
20	—	Maryland Terrapins	10–3	Peach Bowl
21	—	Virginia Tech Hokies	9–4	San Francisco Bowl
22	—	Florida Gators	8–4	Outback Bowl
23	—	Colorado State Rams	10–3	Liberty Bowl
24	—	Pittsburgh Panthers	8–4	Insight Bowl
25	—	Arkansas Razorbacks	9–4	Music City Bowl

† denotes a BCS bowl game
‡ ineligible for bowl play due to NCAA sanctions

== Schedule ==
Non BCS Contests
Date	Game	Site	Time (US EST)	TV	Matchup (pre-game record)	AP pre-game rank	USA Today pre-game rank
12/17	New Orleans Bowl	Louisiana Superdome; New Orleans, Louisiana	7:00 PM	ESPN2	North Texas 24 (7–5), Cincinnati 19 (7–6)	NR; NR	NR; NR
12/18	GMAC Bowl	Ladd–Peebles Stadium; Mobile, Alabama	8:00 PM	ESPN	Marshall 38 (10–2), Louisville 15 (7–5)	NR; NR	#24; NR
12/23	Tangerine Bowl	Citrus Bowl; Orlando, Florida	6:30 PM	ESPN	Texas Tech 55 (8–5), Clemson 15 (7–5)	NR; NR	NR; NR
12/25	Las Vegas Bowl	Sam Boyd Stadium; Whitney, Nevada	4:30 PM	ESPN	UCLA 27 (7–5), New Mexico 13 (7–6)	NR; NR	NR; NR
12/25	Hawai'i Bowl	Aloha Stadium; Honolulu, Hawaii	8:00 PM	ESPN	Tulane 36 (7–5), Hawaii 28 (10–3)	NR; NR	NR; NR
12/26	Motor City Bowl	Ford Field; Detroit, Michigan	5:00 PM	ESPN	Boston College 51 (8–4), Toledo 25 (9–4)	NR; NR	NR; NR
12/26	Insight Bowl	Bank One Ballpark; Phoenix, Arizona	8:30 PM	ESPN	Pittsburgh 38 (8–4), Oregon State 13 (8–4)	#24; NR	#23; NR
12/27	Houston Bowl	Reliant Stadium; Houston, Texas	2:30 PM	ESPN	Oklahoma State 33 (7–5), Southern Miss 23 (7–5)	NR; NR	NR; NR
12/27	Independence Bowl	Independence Stadium; Shreveport, Louisiana	5:30 PM	ESPN	Ole Miss 27 (6–6), Nebraska 23 (7–6)	NR; NR	NR; NR
12/27	Holiday Bowl	Qualcomm Stadium; San Diego, California	8:00 PM	ESPN	Kansas State 34 (10–2), Arizona State 27 (8–5)	#6; NR	#6; NR
12/28	Continental Tire Bowl	Ericsson Stadium; Charlotte, North Carolina	12:00 PM	ESPN	Virginia 48 (8–5), West Virginia 22 (9–3)	NR #15	NR #13
12/28	Alamo Bowl	Alamodome; San Antonio, Texas	8:00 PM	ESPN	Wisconsin 31 (7–6), Colorado 28 (9–4) (OT)	NR #14	NR #14
12/30	Music City Bowl	LP Field; Nashville, Tennessee	2:00 PM	ESPN	Minnesota 29 (7–5), Arkansas 14 (9–4)	NR #25	NR; NR
12/30	Seattle Bowl	Qwest Field; Seattle, Washington	5:00 PM	ESPN	Wake Forest 38 (6–6), Oregon 14 (7–5)	NR; NR	NR; NR
12/31	Humanitarian Bowl	Bronco Stadium; Boise, Idaho	12:00 PM	ESPN	Boise State 34 (11–1), Iowa State 16 (7–6)	#18; NR	#15; NR
12/31	Sun Bowl	Sun Bowl Stadium; El Paso, Texas	2:00 PM	CBS	Purdue 34 (6–6), Washington 24 (7–5)	NR; NR	NR; NR
12/31	Liberty Bowl	Liberty Bowl Memorial Stadium; Memphis, Tennessee	2:30 PM	ESPN	TCU 17 (9–2), Colorado State 3 (10–3)	NR #23	NR #21
12/31	Silicon Valley Classic	Spartan Stadium; San Jose, California	3:30 PM	ESPN2	Fresno State 30 (8–5), Georgia Tech 21 (7–5)	NR; NR	NR; NR
12/31	Peach Bowl	Georgia Dome; Atlanta, Georgia	7:30 PM	ESPN	Maryland 30 (10–3), Tennessee 3 (8–4)	#20; NR	#18; NR
12/31	San Francisco Bowl	Pacific Bell Park; San Francisco, California	8:30 PM	ESPN2	Virginia Tech 20 (9–4), Air Force 13 (8–4)	#21; NR	#19; NR
1/1	Outback Bowl	Raymond James Stadium; Tampa, Florida	11:00 AM	ESPN	Michigan 38 (9–3), Florida 30 (8–4)	#12 #22	#11 #20
1/1	Cotton Bowl Classic	Cotton Bowl; Dallas, Texas	11:00 AM	FOX	Texas 35 (10–2), LSU 20 (8–4)	#9; NR	#9 #25
1/1	Gator Bowl	Alltel Stadium; Jacksonville, Florida	12:30 PM	NBC	NC State 28 (10–3), Notre Dame 6 (10–2)	#17 #11	#17 #12
1/1	Capital One Bowl	Citrus Bowl; Orlando, Florida	1:00 PM	ABC	Auburn 13 (8–4), Penn State 9 (9–3)	#19 #10	#22 #10
Bowl Championship Series
Date	Game	Site	Time (US EST)	TV	Matchup	AP rank	BCS rank
1/1	Rose Bowl	Rose Bowl; Pasadena, California	4:30 PM	ABC	Oklahoma 34 (11–2) (Big 12 Champion), Washington State 14 (10–2) (Pac-10 co-Champ)	#8 #7	#7 #6
1/1	Sugar Bowl	Louisiana Superdome; New Orleans, Louisiana	8:30 PM	ABC	Georgia 26 (12–1) (SEC Champion), Florida State 13 (9–4) (ACC Champion)	#4 #16	#3 #14
1/2	Orange Bowl	Pro Player Stadium; Miami Gardens, Florida	8 PM	ABC	USC 38 (10–2) (Pac-10 co-Champion), Iowa 17 (11–1) (Big Ten co-Champion)	#5 #3	#4 #5
1/3	Fiesta Bowl (BCS National Championship Game)	Sun Devil Stadium; Tempe, Arizona	8 PM	ABC	Ohio State 31 (13–0) (Big Ten co-Champion), Miami 24 (12–0) (Big East Champion)	#2 #1	#2 #1

== All-star games ==
Date	Game	Winning Team		Losing Team		Venue	City
January 11, 2003	East–West Shrine Game	East Team	20	West Team	17	SBC Park	San Francisco, California
January 18, 2003	Senior Bowl	North Team	17	South Team	0	Ladd–Peebles Stadium	Mobile, Alabama
January 25, 2003	Gridiron Classic	Team USA	20	Team Florida	17	Citrus Bowl	Orlando, Florida
January 25, 2003	Paradise Bowl	Midwest All-Stars	36	West All-Stars	31	Hansen Stadium	St. George, Utah
February 1, 2003	Hula Bowl	South (Aina)	27	North (Kai)	24	War Memorial Stadium	Wailuku, Hawaii
