= 2002 Continental Tire Bowl =

West Virginia Mountaineers	Virginia Cavaliers
(9–3)	(8–5)
Big East	ACC
22	48
Head coach: Rich Rodriguez	Head coach: Al Groh
AP / Coaches / BCS; 15 / 13 / 15
	1	2	3	4	Total
West Virginia	10	0	6	6	22
Virginia	7	21	10	10	48
- Date: December 28, 2002
- Season: 2002
- Stadium: Ericsson Stadium
- Location: Charlotte, North Carolina
- MVP: Wali Lundy, Virginia (RB)
- Favorite: West Virginia by 1.5
- Referee: Frank White (WAC)
- Attendance: 73,535

United States TV coverage
- Network: ESPN
- Announcers: Wayne Larivee (play-by-play); Randy Wright (analysis); Mike Gleason (sidelines)

The 2002 Continental Tire Bowl was a postseason college football bowl game between the West Virginia Mountaineers and the Virginia Cavaliers (UVA) at Ericsson Stadium in Charlotte, North Carolina, on December 28, 2002. The first edition of the Continental Tire Bowl, the game was the final contest of the 2002 NCAA Division I-A football season (Note: In August 2006 the NCAA changed the name of Division I-A to Football Bowl Subdivision (FBS) and Division I-AA to Football Championship Subdivision (FCS). In this article the old names are used when referring to events that occurred before August 2006.) for both teams, and ended in a 48–22 victory for Virginia. West Virginia represented the Big East Conference in the game; Virginia represented the Atlantic Coast Conference (ACC).

== Team selection ==
In its inaugural season the Continental Tire Bowl had contracts with the Big East and Atlantic Coast Conferences that allowed them to select one team from each conference to participate in their annual game. From the Big East the bowl selected No. 15 (Note: All rankings are based on the Associated Press (AP) Poll unless otherwise noted.) West Virginia, the second-highest ranked team in the conference following conference champion and No. 1 Miami; Virginia was selected out of the ACC. The two teams had played each other twenty-two times historically, although not since 1985; the Cavaliers held a 12–10–1 advantage in the all-time series.

West Virginia's first game of the 2002 season was against Division I–AA Chattanooga; the Mountaineers won handily 56–7. Their next game was at Wisconsin; West Virginia lost, 34–17. Following two wins against Cincinnati and East Carolina, the Mountaineers lost their second game of the season, against No. 18 Maryland 48–17. West Virginia opened Big East conference play against Rutgers, whom they shut out 40–0. Following a win over Syracuse, the Mountaineers lost their only Big East contest of the year, against No. 1 Miami 40–23. West Virginia would close out their season with four straight wins, over Temple, Boston College, Virginia Tech, and Pittsburgh, finishing the regular season with a record of 9–3, 6–1 within the Big East.

Virginia opened their 2002 season with two losses against ranked teams, losing at home to No. 21 Colorado State 35–29 and on the road at No. 16 Florida State 40–19. The Cavaliers bounced back from this early setback, winning their next six games. The first, against No. 22 South Carolina, saw the breakout of future National Football League (NFL) starting quarterback Matt Schaub, who threw three touchdown passes in a 34–21 win. Wins against Akron, Wake Forest, Duke, Clemson, and North Carolina followed, until the winning streak was broken by consecutive losses to Georgia Tech and No. 10 Penn State. Virginia then won consecutive games against ranked teams, beating No. 17 North Carolina State 14–9 and No. 18 Maryland 48–13, before closing out the regular season with a 21–9 loss to rival No. 19 Virginia Tech. Virginia finished the regular season with a record of 8–5, 6–2 within the ACC.

== Game summary ==
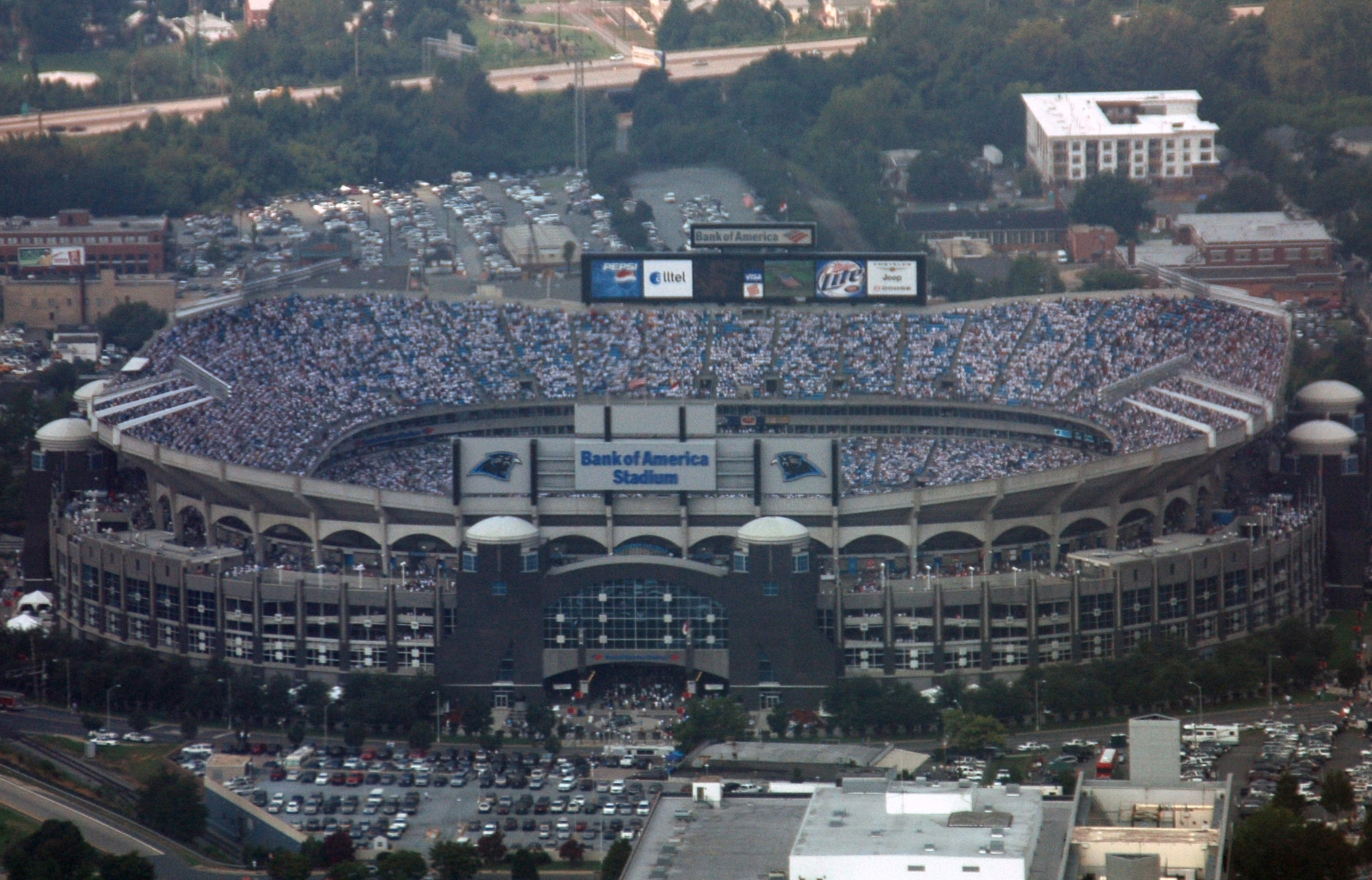
Ericsson Stadium (later renamed Bank of America Stadium) was the home of the 2002 Continental Tire Bowl.

The game kicked off on December 28, 2002, at 12:00 PM, before a sellout crowd of 73,535 at Ericsson Stadium.

=== First quarter ===
The Virginia Cavaliers received the ball to start the game, fielding the kickoff at the 1-yard line and returning it to the 15. After a short drive where the Cavaliers brought the ball to the West Virginia 45-yard-line, they were forced to punt. The Mountaineers received the ball at their own 18-yard line and proceed to drive down the field. West Virginia got as far as the Virginia 5-yard-line before being stopped; after a five-yard penalty, Mountaineer kicker Todd James connected on a 27-yard field goal, giving West Virginia a 3–0 lead with 6:11 left in the first quarter.

Virginia got the ball back at their own 42-yard line after a 35-yard kickoff return by running back Wali Lundy. Driving to the West Virginia 14-yard line, on 2nd-and-10 Virginia executed a trick play where wide receiver Marques Hagans threw a pass to running back Wali Lundy. The play was good for a touchdown; after the successful extra-point, the Cavaliers held a 7–3 lead with 4:06 left in the first quarter.

West Virginia began their next drive from their own 22-yard-line after a ten-yard penalty on the kickoff. On 3rd-and-5 from their own 27-yard-line, Mountaineer quarterback Rasheed Marshall completed a 43-yard pass to wide receiver Phil Braxton, moving his team into Virginia territory. After earning two more first downs, on 1st-and-goal from the Cavalier six-yard-line, West Virginia scored on a touchdown run by running back Avon Cobourne. Virginia would only have time to make one play after getting the ball back until the quarter expired, making the score at the end of the first quarter 10–7 in West Virginia's favor.

=== Second quarter ===
The Cavaliers faced a 2nd-and-3 on their own 37-yard-line as the second quarter began. Behind the rushing of Wali Lundy, and the passing and rushing of quarterback Matt Schaub, Virginia moved down the field, earning four first downs. On 1st-and-goal from the seven-yard-line, Lundy ran right from two yards; on second down Schaub ran for four more, placing the ball on the one-yard-line. A third-down rush by Lundy failed to make progress. Rather than kick the field goal, the Cavaliers elected to go for it on fourth down. Matt Schaub ran the ball up the middle, scoring the touchdown. After the extra-point, Virginia held a 14–10 lead with 10:12 left in the half.

After a touchback on the kickoff, the Mountaineers began their next drive on their own 20-yard-line. They went three-and-out, and punted the ball back to Virginia. Marques Hagans caught the punt on his own 31-yard-line and ran it back 69 yards for the touchdown. After the extra-point, the Cavaliers now held a 21–10 lead with 7:53 left in the half.

West Virginia got the ball back and drove to midfield. On 3rd-and-15 from the Virginia 47-yard-line, the Mountaineers attempted a wide receiver passing play, similar to the one Virginia used earlier to score a touchdown. This play was far less successful, however; Phil Braxton's pass was intercepted by Cavalier linebacker Darryl Blackstock. Virginia proceeded to drive down the field, helped by a key Mountaineer mistake: a West Virginia penalty on 4th-and-2 gave the Cavaliers 1st-and-goal from the 4-yard-line. Wali Lundy would run the ball in on the next play, giving Virginia after the extra-point a 28–10 advantage. With only seconds left in the half, West Virginia upon getting the ball back attempted a Hail Mary pass that was caught by wide receiver Miquelle Henderson; unfortunately, he was four yards short of the goal line, and West Virginia did not have enough time to run a play before the half expired. At halftime, Virginia held a 28–10 lead.

=== Third quarter ===
West Virginia got the ball to start the third quarter, but were unable to advance beyond their own 36-yard-line, and punted. Virginia began their drive at their own 25-yard-line, and achieved two first downs off Matt Schaub passes, moving to midfield. On 3rd-and-9 from the West Virginia 48-yard-line, Schaub passed the ball to Wali Lundy, who carried the ball all the way down the field for a touchdown. After another successful extra-point, Virginia now led the Mountaineers 35–10 with 9:10 remaining in the quarter.

West Virginia's misfortunes continued on their next drive, when, on the first play from scrimmage, Rasheed Marshall's pass was intercepted by cornerback Almondo Curry. The Cavaliers had a 1st-and-goal from the Mountaineer 9-yard-line, but this time were unable to drive the ball into the end zone. Instead, Connor Hughes kicked a 27-yard field goal, expanding the Virginia lead to 38–10 with 6:48 left in the quarter.

The Mountaineer finally responded on their next series. Starting from their own 20-yard-line, West Virginia drove down the field off of Rasheed Marshall passes and Avon Cobourne runs. Marshall would finally run in the touchdown himself from one yard out on 2nd-and-goal. The extra-point attempt was blocked, however. Virginia would complete two passes on their next drive before the quarter ended. The score was 38–16 in favor of Virginia.

=== Fourth quarter ===
Virginia started the final quarter with the ball at midfield. The Cavaliers continued their drive but were stopped at the West Virginia 15-yard-line. Connor Hughes kicked the 30-yard field goal, giving Virginia a 41–16 lead with 12:12 left in the game.

The Mountaineers, although well out of the game by now, drove down the field on their next possession. Starting from their own 19-yard-line, West Virginia earned six first downs and finally scored the touchdown on a 1-yard rush by Avon Cobourne. The Mountaineers went for the two-point conversion, but Rasheed Marshall was tackled before he could reach the end zone. The score was now 41–22, in Virginia's favor, with 7:17 left in the game.

West Virginia attempted an onside kick on the kickoff to regain possession, but the ball was recovered by Virginia safety Shernard Newby. Starting from the West Virginia 48-yard-line, the Cavaliers kept the ball on the ground in order to run out the clock. On 3rd-and-4 from the West Virginia 31-yard-line, however, Wali Lundy broke free and ran all the way to the end zone for the final score of the game. The Mountaineers got the ball back but after one first down were unable to convert on fourth down, giving the ball back to Virginia. The Cavaliers took two knees to end the game. Virginia won the game, 48–22.

=== Scoring summary ===
Scoring summary

Quarter	Time	Drive			Team	Scoring information	Score	
Quarter	Time	Plays	Yards	TOP	Team	Scoring information	WVU	UVA
1	06:11		72	5:29	WVU	27-yard field goal by Todd James	3	0
1	04:06		58	1:54	UVA	Wali Lundy 14-yard touchdown reception from Marques Hagans, Connor Hughes kick good	3	7
1	00:19		78	3:36	WVU	Avon Cobourne 6-yard touchdown run, Todd James kick good	10	7
2	10:12		70	4:55	UVA	Matt Schaub 1-yard touchdown run, Connor Hughes kick good	10	14
2	07:53		0	0:00	UVA	Marques Hagans 69 yard punt return, Connor Hughes kick good	10	21
2	00:19		48	4:36	UVA	Wali Lundy 4-yard touchdown run, Connor Hughes kick good	10	28
3	09:10		75	2:24	UVA	Wali Lundy 14-yard touchdown reception from Matt Schaub, Connor Hughes kick good	10	35
3	06:48		0	2:13	UVA	27-yard field goal by Connor Hughes	10	38
3	00:56		80	5:44	WVU	Rasheed Marshall 1-yard touchdown run, Todd James kick blocked	16	38
4	12:12		53	3:39	UVA	30-yard field goal by Connor Hughes	16	41
4	07:17		81	4:57	WVU	Avon Cobourne 1-yard touchdown run, 2-point run failed	22	41
4	03:48		49	3:25	UVA	Wali Lundy 31-yard touchdown run, Connor Hughes kick good	22	48
"TOP" = time of possession. For other American football terms, see Glossary of American football.							22	48

== Final statistics ==
Statistical comparison
	WVU	UVA
1st downs	21	20
Total yards	459	391
Passing yards	215	196
Rushing yards	244	195
Penalties	6–39	2–9
3rd down conversions	11–16	9–15
4th down conversions	0–1	2–2
Turnovers	2	0
Time of possession	31:34	28:26

For his performance in the 2002 Continental Tire Bowl—4 touchdowns and 203 total yards receiving and rushing—Virginia running back Wali Lundy was named the most valuable player of the game. He led the Cavaliers in both rushing—22 carries, 127 yards—and receiving—five catches, 76 yards—while scoring four touchdowns. Two other Virginia players scored multiple touchdowns in the game: quarterback Matt Schaub passed for a touchdown and ran for a touchdown, while wide receiver and backup quarterback Marques Hagans passed for a touchdown and ran back a punt for a touchdown.

Schaub led the Cavalier passing attack completing 16 out of 22 passes for 182 yards and a touchdown, while Hagans was 1-for-1 with his 14-yard touchdown pass being his only passing attempt on the game. In the running game, second after Lundy's performance was Matt Schaub's effort—seven carries, 39 yards, and a touchdown. Running back Michael Johnson ran three times for 23 yards; running back Brandon Isaiah had three carries for 13 yards. Safety Marquis Weeks, playing offense, ran three times for a net loss of three yards. Receiving-wise, after Lundy, wide receiver Ryan Sawyer caught four passes for 41 yards; tight end Heath Miller caught three passes for 54 yards. Brandon Isaiah caught three passes for ten yards; Billy McMullen and Michael McGrew each caught one pass, for eight and seven yards respectively.

For West Virginia, quarterback Rasheed Marshall completed 12 out of 18 passes for 215 yards and one interception. Wide receiver Phil Braxton attempted one pass that was intercepted; Danny Embick threw one incomplete pass. In the running game, Avon Cobourne led the Mountaineers with 25 carries for 117 yards and two touchdowns. Rasheed Marshall supplemented the rushing attack with 12 carries for 48 yards and a touchdown. Running back Quincy Wilson had ten carries for 38 yards; the remaining rushing attempts were made by Aaron Neal (one carry, 22 yards), Phil Braxton (two carries, 12 yards), and Danny Embick (two carries, seven yards). West Virginia's receiving attack was led by Phil Braxton, who caught four passes for 108 yards. Miquelle Henderson caught two passes for 75 yards; Derrick Smith caught two passes for nine yards. The remaining four receptions were split between Darnell Glover (14 yards), A.J. Nastasi (five yards), Tory Johnson (five yards), and Quincy Wilson (−1 yard).

== See also ==
- Glossary of American football
- American football positions
- Virginia Pep Band § The Expulsion of 2003
