= 2002 Syracuse Orangemen football team =

American college football season

2002 Syracuse Orangemen football
- Conference: Big East Conference
- Record: 4–8 (2–5 Big East)
- Head coach: Paul Pasqualoni (12th season)
- Offensive coordinator: George DeLeone (14th season)
- Defensive coordinator: Chris Rippon (4th season)
- Captains: Clifton Smith; Chris Davis; Will Hunter; Troy Nunes; David Tyree
- Home stadium: Carrier Dome

2002 Big East Conference football standings
	Conf.			Overall
Team	W		L	W		L
No. 2 Miami (FL) $	7	–	0	12	–	1
No. 25 West Virginia	6	–	1	9	–	4
No. 19 Pittsburgh	5	–	2	9	–	4
No. 18 Virginia Tech	3	–	4	10	–	4
Boston College	3	–	4	9	–	4
Temple	2	–	5	4	–	8
Syracuse	2	–	5	4	–	8
Rutgers	0	–	7	1	–	11
$ – BCS representative as conference champion; Rankings from AP Poll

The 2002 Syracuse Orangemen football team represented Syracuse University as a member of the Big East Conference during the 2002 NCAA Division I-A football season. Led by 12th-year head coach Paul Pasqualoni, the Orangemen compiled an overall record of 4–8 with a mark of 2–5 in conference play, tying for sixth place in the Big East. The team played home games at the Carrier Dome in Syracuse, New York.

== Schedule ==
Date	Time	Opponent	Site	TV	Result	Attendance
August 29	7:45 pm	at BYU*	LaVell Edwards Stadium; Provo, UT	ESPN	L 21–42	65,612
September 7	8:00 pm	North Carolina*	Carrier Dome; Syracuse, NY	ESPN2	L 22–30	39,444
September 14	3:30 pm	Rhode Island*	Carrier Dome; Syracuse, NY		W 63–17	43,089
September 28	9:00 pm	at No. 25 Auburn*	Jordan–Hare Stadium; Auburn, AL	ESPN2	L 34–37 ^{3OT}	83,667
October 5	12:00 pm	Pittsburgh	Carrier Dome; Syracuse, NY (rivalry)	ESPN Plus	L 24–48	39,947
October 12	12:00 pm	at Temple	Veterans Stadium; Philadelphia, PA	TWCSN	L 16–17	17,220
October 18	12:00 pm	at West Virginia	Mountaineer Field; Morgantown, WV (rivalry)	ESPN Plus	L 7–34	45,088
October 25	1:30 pm	Rutgers	Carrier Dome; Syracuse, NY		W 45–14	37,158
November 2	7:00 pm	at UCF*	Florida Citrus Bowl; Orlando, FL	ESPN Plus	W 38–35	24,043
November 9	3:30 pm	No. 8 Virginia Tech	Carrier Dome; Syracuse, NY	ESPN	W 50–42 ^{3OT}	48,239
November 16	12:00 pm	at Boston College	Alumni Stadium; Chestnut Hill, MA	ESPN Plus	L 20–41	36,221
November 30	1:00 pm	No. 1 Miami	Carrier Dome; Syracuse, NY	ABC	L 7–49	45,679
*Non-conference game; Rankings from AP Poll released prior to the game; All times are in Eastern time

== Roster ==
2002 Syracuse Orange football team roster
Players
Coaches
Offense

Pos.	#	Name	Class
QB	5	R. J. Anderson	Jr
C	68	Chris Buda	Jr
RB	34	Chris Davis	Sr
TE	85	Joe Kowalewski	Fr
WR	2	Johnnie Morant	Jr
QB	11	Troy Nunes	Sr
OT	69	Quinn Ojinnaka	Fr
OT	74	Kevin Sampson	Jr
G	62	John Swanson-Flading	Fr
OT	78	Adam Terry	So
WR	81	David Tyree	Sr

Defense

Pos.	#	Name	Class
DT	91	Eugene Brown	Fr
CB	25	Steve Gregory	Fr
CB	30	Will Hunter	Sr
DE	94	Ryan LaCasse	Fr
LB	57	Rich Scanlon	Jr
LB	9	Clifton Smith	Sr
DE	97	Josh Thomas	Jr

Special teams

Pos.	#	Name	Class

Head coach

- Paul Pasqualoni

Coordinators/assistant coaches

- Jerry Azzinaro (defensive line / recruiting coordinator)

Legend

- (C) Team captain
- (S) Suspended
- (I) Ineligible
- Injured
- Redshirt

Roster

== Team players in the 2003 NFL draft ==
Player	Position	Round	Pick	NFL club
Chris Davis	Running back	5	165	Seattle Seahawks
David Tyree	Wide Receiver	6	211	New York Giants
