= Craig Wrolstad =

American football official (born 1965)

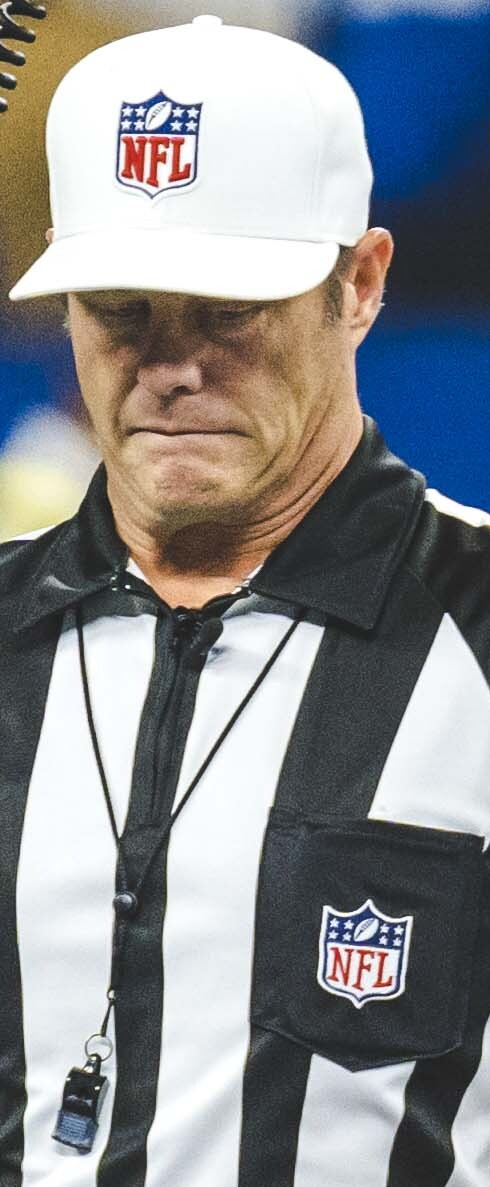
- Wrolstad in 2022
- Born: September 5, 1965 (age 60); Lake Tapps, Washington, U.S.
- Occupation: NFL official (2003–present)
- Spouse: Chrystal
- Children: 2

Craig Wrolstad (born September 5, 1965) is an American professional football official in the National Football League (NFL) since the 2003 NFL season, wearing uniform number 4.

As an official in the NFL, Wrolstad is known for working Super Bowl XLVII in 2013 as a field judge. He wore uniform number 89 and 4 as a field judge.

== Personal life ==
He went to Middle School (7 8 9) at Meeker Junior High (now Meeker Middle School), and went to high school at Lindbergh High School

Wrolstad resides in Lake Tapps, Washington.

Outside of the NFL, Wrolstad is a high school athletic director at Seattle Christian School.

== Officiating career ==
=== Early years ===
Wrolstad served several seasons in NFL Europe, including three seasons as a referee. Prior to entering the NFL, Wrolstad was in the Pacific-10 Conference and the Arena Football League. His final collegiate game was the 2003 Sugar Bowl between Georgia and Florida State.

=== NFL career ===
Wrolstad was hired by the NFL in 2003 as a field judge, and was promoted to referee with the start of the 2014 NFL season following the retirements of Ron Winter and Scott Green. Wrolstad wore uniform number 89 as a field judge, then switched to number 4 upon his promotion. Number 4 was previously worn by Bruce Finlayson, Bill Kingzett, Wilson Gosier and Doug Toole.

Wrolstad was named the alternate referee of Super Bowl LII, which was held at U.S. Bank Stadium in Minneapolis.

Wrolstad was named the referee of 2020 Pro Bowl, which was held at Camping World Stadium in Orlando, Florida.

=== 2024 crew ===
- R: Craig Wrolstad
- U: Steve Woods
- DJ: Danny Short
- LJ: Brett Bergman
- FJ: Jeff Shears
- SJ: Frank Steratore
- BJ: Rich Martinez
- RO: Gavin Anderson
- RA: Ken Hall
