= 2003 NCAA football bowl games =

In college football, 2003 NCAA football bowl games may refer to:

- 2002–03 NCAA football bowl games, for games played in January 2003 as part of the 2002 season.
- 2003–04 NCAA football bowl games, for games played in December 2003 as part of the 2003 season.
