= 2002 Rutgers Scarlet Knights football team =

American college football season

2002 Rutgers Scarlet Knights football
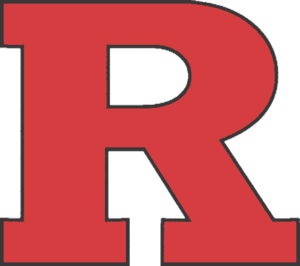
- Conference: Big East Conference
- Record: 1–11 (0–7 Big East)
- Head coach: Greg Schiano (2nd season)
- Offensive coordinator: Bill Cubit (2nd season)
- Offensive scheme: Pro-style
- Defensive coordinator: Paul Ferraro (2nd season)
- Base defense: 4–3
- Home stadium: Rutgers Stadium

2002 Big East Conference football standings
	Conf.			Overall
Team	W		L	W		L
No. 2 Miami (FL) $	7	–	0	12	–	1
No. 25 West Virginia	6	–	1	9	–	4
No. 19 Pittsburgh	5	–	2	9	–	4
No. 18 Virginia Tech	3	–	4	10	–	4
Boston College	3	–	4	9	–	4
Temple	2	–	5	4	–	8
Syracuse	2	–	5	4	–	8
Rutgers	0	–	7	1	–	11
$ – BCS representative as conference champion; Rankings from AP Poll

The 2002 Rutgers Scarlet Knights football team represented Rutgers University in the 2002 NCAA Division I-A football season. The Scarlet Knights were led by second-year head coach Greg Schiano and played their home games at Rutgers Stadium. They are a member of the Big East Conference. They finished the season 1–11, 0–7 in Big East play to finish in last place.

== Schedule ==
Date	Time	Opponent	Site	TV	Result	Attendance	Source
August 31	7:00 pm	Villanova*	Rutgers Stadium; Piscataway, NJ		L 19–37	20,911	
September 7	7:00 pm	Buffalo*	Rutgers Stadium; Piscataway, NJ		L 11–34	19,101	
September 14	7:00 pm	Army*^{†}	Rutgers Stadium; Piscataway, NJ	ESPN Plus	W 44–0	28,514	
September 21	12:00 pm	at Pittsburgh	Heinz Field; Pittsburgh, PA	ESPN Plus	L 3–23	32,519	
September 28	7:00 pm	at No. 11 Tennessee*	Neyland Stadium; Knoxville, TN	PPV	L 14–35	103,925	
October 12	3:30 pm	West Virginia	Rutgers Stadium; Piscataway, NJ	ESPN Plus	L 0–40	12,937	
October 19	1:00 pm	at No. 3 Virginia Tech	Lane Stadium; Blacksburg, VA	PPV	L 14–35	64,907	
October 26	1:30 pm	at Syracuse	Carrier Dome; Syracuse, NY		L 14–45	37,158	
November 2	12:00 pm	No. 1 Miami (FL)	Rutgers Stadium; Piscataway, NJ	ESPN Plus	L 17–42	27,222	
November 16	3:30 pm	Temple	Rutgers Stadium; Piscataway, NJ	ESPN Plus	L 17–20	10,225	
November 23	1:00 pm	at No. 8 Notre Dame*	Notre Dame Stadium; Notre Dame, IN	NBC	L 0–42	80,795	
November 30	12:00 pm	at Boston College	Alumni Stadium; Chestnut Hill, MA	ESPN Plus	L 14–44	33,786	
*Non-conference game; ^{†}Homecoming; Rankings from AP Poll released prior to the game; All times are in Eastern time

== Roster ==
2002 Rutgers Scarlet Knights football team roster
Players
Coaches
Offense

Pos.	#	Name	Class
OL	71	Dan Biernacki	So
OL	69	Howard Blackwood	Sr
TE	86	Bryan Boehrer	Sr
QB	17	Brian Boland	Fr
OL	74	Randy Boxill	Fr
TE	88	Keith Landi	Jr
FB	15	Brian Leonard	Fr
TE	87	Chris Loomis	So
OL	75	Mark Segaloff	So
TE	85	L. J. Smith	Sr
FB	36	Joe Stellke	Jr
WR	84	Jeff Ternyila	So
FB	47	Ray Pilch	Jr
RB	2	Clarence Pittman	So
QB	16	Ted Trump	Sr
WR	89	Shawn Tucker	Fr
WR	46	Antonio Valverde	Fr
FB	48	Nafi Williams	Fr
OL	62	Mike Williamson	Jr
WR	10	Bryan Wilson	So
RB	37	Brandon Wood	Fr

Defense

Pos.	#	Name	Class
LB	42	Brian Bender	Sr
LB	57	Steve Berson	Sr
LB	41	Gary Brackett	Sr
DE	1	Raheem Orr	Sr
DL	99	J'Vonne Parker	Jr
DE	92	Alfred Peterson	So
DL	60	Justin Peyton	Fr

Special teams

Pos.	#	Name	Class
P	13	Mike Barr	Sr

Head coach

- Greg Schiano

Coordinators/assistant coaches

- Marwan Maalouf (graduate assistant)

Legend

- (C) Team captain
- (S) Suspended
- (I) Ineligible
- Injured
- Redshirt

Roster
Last update: 2002-12-01

== Team players in the NFL ==
Player	Position	Round	Pick	NFL club
L. J. Smith	Tight end	2	61	Philadelphia Eagles
