= 2002 Duke Blue Devils football team =

American college football season

2002 Duke Blue Devils football
- Conference: Atlantic Coast Conference
- Record: 2–10 (0–8 ACC)
- Head coach: Carl Franks (4th season)
- Offensive scheme: Fun and gun
- Defensive coordinator: Ted Roof (1st season)
- Base defense: Multiple 4–3
- MVP: Alex Wade
- Captains: Ryan Fowler; Jamyon Small; Drew Strojny
- Home stadium: Wallace Wade Stadium

2002 Atlantic Coast Conference football standings
	Conf.			Overall
Team	W		L	W		L
No. 21 Florida State $	7	–	1	9	–	5
No. 22 Virginia	6	–	2	9	–	5
No. 13 Maryland	6	–	2	11	–	3
No. 12 NC State	5	–	3	11	–	3
Clemson	4	–	4	7	–	6
Georgia Tech	4	–	4	7	–	6
Wake Forest	3	–	5	7	–	6
North Carolina	1	–	7	3	–	9
Duke	0	–	8	2	–	10
$ – BCS representative as conference champion; Rankings from AP Poll

The 2002 Duke Blue Devils football team represented the Duke University in the 2002 NCAA Division I-A football season. The team participated as members of the Atlantic Coast Conference. They played their homes games at Wallace Wade Stadium in Durham, North Carolina. The team was led by head coach Carl Franks.

== Schedule ==
Date	Time	Opponent	Site	TV	Result	Attendance
August 31	6:00 pm	East Carolina*	Wallace Wade Stadium; Durham, NC		W 23–16	23,276
September 7	7:00 pm	Louisville*	Wallace Wade Stadium; Durham, NC		L 3–40	25,486
September 14	1:00 pm	at Northwestern*	Ryan Field; Evanston, IL		L 21–26	22,910
September 21	7:00 pm	at No. 5 Florida State	Doak Campbell Stadium; Tallahassee, FL	FSN	L 17–48	82,397
September 28	12:00 pm	at Navy*	Navy–Marine Corps Memorial Stadium; Annapolis, MD	HDNet	W 43–17	31,647
October 5	12:00 pm	Virginia^{†}	Wallace Wade Stadium; Durham, NC	JPS	L 22–27	17,638
October 12	3:30 pm	at Wake Forest	Groves Stadium; Winston-Salem, NC (rivalry)		L 10–36	25,856
October 19	12:00 pm	at No. 13 NC State	Carter–Finley Stadium; Raleigh, NC (rivalry)		L 22–24	51,500
October 26	1:00 pm	Maryland	Wallace Wade Stadium; Durham, NC		L 12–45	23,451
November 2	12:00 pm	Clemson	Wallace Wade Stadium; Durham, NC	JPS	L 31–34	16,479
November 16	1:00 pm	at Georgia Tech	Bobby Dodd Stadium; Atlanta, GA		L 2–17	41,335
November 23	12:00 pm	North Carolina	Wallace Wade Stadium; Durham, NC (Victory Bell)	JPS	L 21–23	30,002
*Non-conference game; ^{†}Homecoming; Rankings from AP Poll released prior to the game; All times are in Eastern time

== Roster ==
2002 Duke Blue Devils football team roster
Players
Coaches
Offense

Pos.	#	Name	Class
OL	62	Lavdrim Bauta	Fr
WR	28	Ronnie Elliott	Fr
OT	65	Christian Mitchell	So
C	78	Dan Mooney	Jr
FB	40	Zach Novak	So
QB	16	Adam Smith	Jr
OT	75	Drew Strojny	Jr

Defense

Pos.	#	Name	Class
LB	13	Giuseppe Aguanno	So
DE	98	Drew Ciepcielinski	Jr
LB	27	Ryan Fowler	Jr
CB	20	Temo George	So
S	17	Alex Green	So
CB	23	Brian Greene	Fr
DE	55	Micah Harris	So
DE	97	David Martin	Fr

Special teams

Pos.	#	Name	Class
LS	47	Seth Carter	Jr

Head coach

- Carl Franks

Coordinators/assistant coaches

- Brad Sherrod
  (Linebackers coach)

Legend

- (C) Team captain
- (S) Suspended
- (I) Ineligible
- Injured
- Redshirt

Roster
Last update: 2002-10-06
