= 2002 Temple Owls football team =

American college football season

2002 Temple Owls football
- Conference: Big East Conference
- Record: 4–8 (2–5 Big East)
- Head coach: Bobby Wallace (5th season)
- Offensive coordinator: Dave Brock (1st season)
- Defensive coordinator: Raymond Monica (5th season)
- Home stadium: Veterans Stadium; Franklin Field

2002 Big East Conference football standings
	Conf.			Overall
Team	W		L	W		L
No. 2 Miami (FL) $	7	–	0	12	–	1
No. 25 West Virginia	6	–	1	9	–	4
No. 19 Pittsburgh	5	–	2	9	–	4
No. 18 Virginia Tech	3	–	4	10	–	4
Boston College	3	–	4	9	–	4
Temple	2	–	5	4	–	8
Syracuse	2	–	5	4	–	8
Rutgers	0	–	7	1	–	11
$ – BCS representative as conference champion; Rankings from AP Poll

The 2002 Temple Owls football team represented Temple University as a member of the Big East Conference during the 2002 NCAA Division I-A football season. Led by fifth-year head coach Bobby Wallace, the Owls compiled an overall record of 4–8 with a mark of 2–5 in conference play, tying for sixth place in the Big East. Temple played home games at Veterans Stadium and Franklin Field in Philadelphia.

== Schedule ==
Date	Time	Opponent	Site	TV	Result	Attendance
August 29	7:00 pm	Richmond*	Franklin Field; Philadelphia, PA		W 34–7	15,329
September 5	4:00 pm	Oregon State*	Franklin Field; Philadelphia, PA	FSNNW	L 3–35	20,162
September 14	12:00 pm	No. 1 Miami (FL)	Franklin Field; Philadelphia, PA	ESPN Plus	L 21–44	33,169
September 21	7:00 pm	at South Carolina*	Williams–Brice Stadium; Columbia, SC		L 21–42	81,409
September 28	12:00 pm	Cincinnati*	Franklin Field; Philadelphia, PA		L 22–35	18,336
October 12	12:00 pm	Syracuse^{†}	Veterans Stadium; Philadelphia, PA	TWCSN	W 17–16	17,220
October 19	12:00 pm	at Connecticut*	Memorial Stadium; Storrs, CT		W 38–24	15,723
October 26	1:00 pm	at No. 3 Virginia Tech	Lane Stadium; Blacksburg, VA	PPV	L 10–20	64,937
November 2	12:00 pm	West Virginia	Veterans Stadium; Philadelphia, PA		L 20–46	15,042
November 9	12:00 pm	at Pittsburgh	Heinz Field; Pittsburgh, PA	ESPN Plus	L 22–29	39,880
November 16	3:30 pm	at Rutgers	Rutgers Stadium; Piscataway, NJ	ESPN Plus	W 20–17	10,225
November 23	12:00 pm	Boston College	Veterans Stadium; Philadelphia, PA	ESPN Plus	L 14–36	14,278
*Non-conference game; ^{†}Homecoming; Rankings from AP Poll released prior to the game; All times are in Eastern time

== Roster ==
2002 Temple Owls football team roster
Players
Coaches
Offense

Pos.	#	Name	Class
G	66	Anthony Bolden	Sr
WR	27	Zamir Cobb	Sr
WR	6	Donnie Coleman	Jr
QB	10	Mike Frost	Sr
OT	79	Dave Yovanovits	Sr

Defense

Pos.	#	Name	Class
DT	73	Dan Klecko	Sr
DT	72	David Terry	Sr
DT	90	Dominique Veney	Jr
FS	9	Jamal Wallace	Sr

Special teams

Pos.	#	Name	Class

Head coach

- Bobby Wallace

Coordinators/assistant coaches

- Nick Rapone secondary

Legend

- (C) Team captain
- (S) Suspended
- (I) Ineligible
- Injured
- Redshirt

Roster
Last update: 2002-08-17

== Team players in the NFL ==
Player	Position	Round	Pick	NFL club
Dan Klecko	Defensive tackle	4	117	New England Patriots
Dave Yovanovits	Tackle	7	237	New York Jets
