= 2002 Peach Bowl =

American college football game

2002 Chick-fil-A Peach Bowl
- 35th Peach Bowl
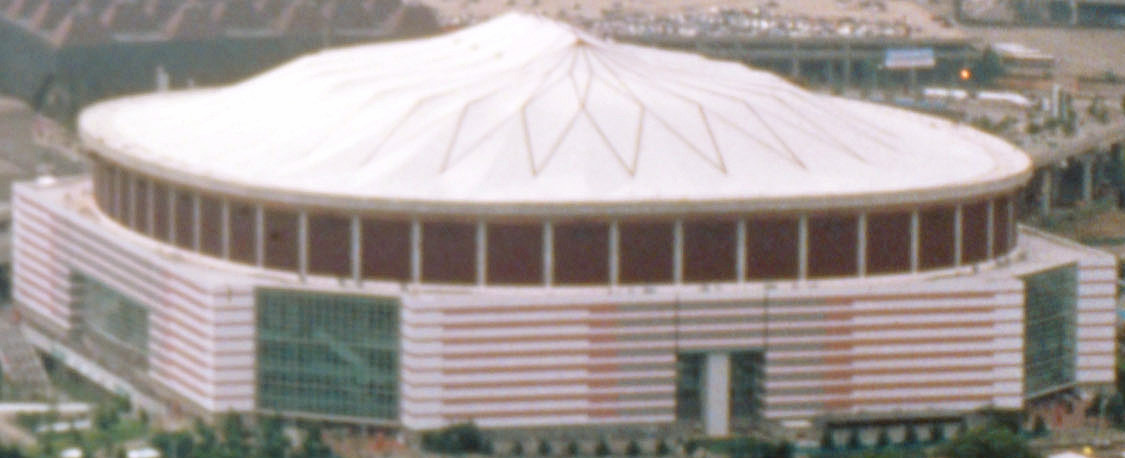
- The Georgia Dome in Atlanta, Georgia, hosted the Peach Bowl.
Tennessee Volunteers	Maryland Terrapins
(8-4)	(10-3)
SEC	ACC
3	30
Head coach: Phillip Fulmer	Head coach: Ralph Friedgen
	AP / Coaches; 20 / 18
	1	2	3	4	Total
Tennessee	0	3	0	0	3
Maryland	7	10	3	10	30
- Date: December 31, 2002
- Season: 2002
- Stadium: Georgia Dome
- Location: Atlanta, Georgia
- Favorite: Tennessee by 1
- Referee: Jim Lapetina (Big Ten)

United States TV coverage
- Network: ESPN
- Announcers: John Saunders, Kirk Herbstreit, Lee Corso, Mike Tirico (sideline)

The 2002 Peach Bowl featured the Tennessee Volunteers and the Maryland Terrapins.

== Game summary ==
=== 1st half ===
Maryland scored first on a 1-yard touchdown run from quarterback Scott McBrien giving Maryland a 7–0 lead. In the second quarter, Maryland cornerback Curome Cox returned an interception 54 yards for a touchdown increasing Maryland's lead to 14–0. Tennessee's Alex Walls kicked a 38-yard field goal, to pull Tennessee to 14–3. Maryland's Nick Novak kicked a 48-yard field goal before halftime to put Maryland up 17–3.

=== 2nd half ===
In the third quarter, Nick Novak kicked a 44-yard field goal making the score 20–3. Scott McBrien scored on a 6-yard touchdown run, increasing the lead to 27–3. Nick Novak's 25 yard field goal made the final score 30–3.
