= 2002 Insight Bowl =

- 14th Insight Bowl
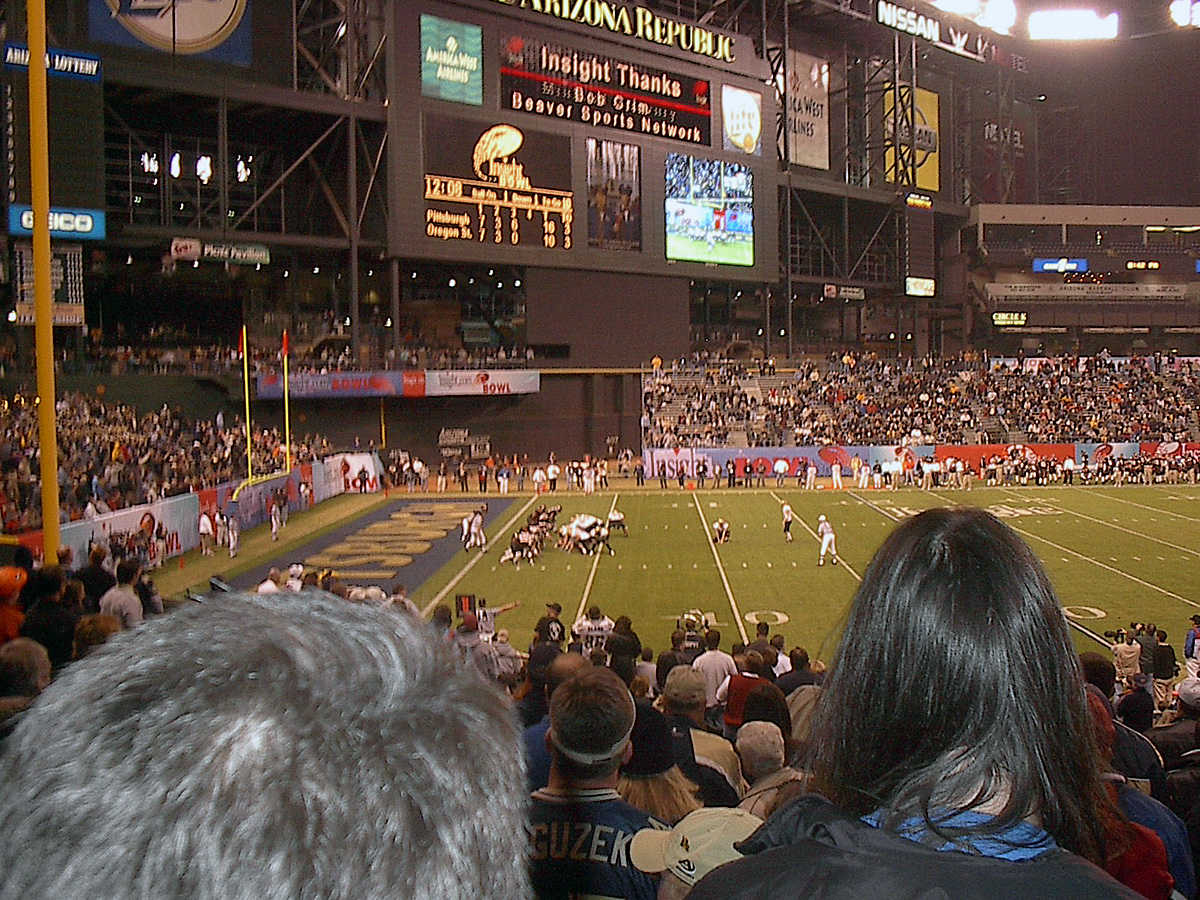
- The 2002 Insight Bowl
Pittsburgh Panthers	Oregon State Beavers
(8–4)	(8–4)
Big East	Pac-10
38	13
Head coach: Walt Harris	Head coach: Dennis Erickson
AP / Coaches / BCS; 24 / 23 / NR
	1	2	3	4	Total
Pittsburgh	7	3	14	14	38
Oregon State	7	3	3	0	13
- Date: December 26, 2002
- Season: 2002
- Stadium: Bank One Ballpark
- Location: Phoenix, Arizona
- Favorite: Oregon State by 1.5
- Referee: David Witvoet (Big Ten)
- Attendance: 40,53

United States TV coverage
- Network: ESPN
- Announcers: Dave Barnett; Mike Golic; Bill Curry; Dave Ryan

The 2002 Insight Bowl was the 14th edition to the Insight Bowl, formerly known as the Copper Bowl and the Insight.com Bowl. It featured the Panthers of the University of Pittsburgh and the Beavers of Oregon State University.

Pittsburgh scored first after a 40-yard touchdown pass from quarterback Rod Rutherford to wide receiver Larry Fitzgerald, taking a 7–0 lead. Oregon State responded with a 65-yard touchdown pass from Derek Anderson to James Newson, tying it at seven. In the second quarter, Oregon State took a 10–7 lead after Kirk Yliniemi kicked a 50-yard field goal. David Abdul kicked a 45-yarder for Pitt, and the game was tied at ten at the half.

Rod Rutherford scored for Pitt on a 1-yard touchdown run in the third quarter to take a 17–10 lead. Late in the quarter, Panthers kick-returner Shawn Robinson scored on a 66-yard punt return, pushing the Panther lead to 24–10. Kirk Yliniemi responded for Oregon State with a 31-yard field goal, making it 24–13 at the end of three quarters. The Panthers extended their lead in the fourth quarter when Brandon Miree scored on an 8-yard touchdown run and Tyler Palko scrambled in for an 8-yard touchdown run to close out the scoring in the game, which ended in a final score of 38–13 in favor of Pitt.
