= Chris Davis (running back) =

American football player (born 1979)

No. 35
- Position: Fullback

Personal information
- Born: November 8, 1979 (age 46); Tampa, Florida, U.S.
- Listed height: 5 ft 11 in (1.80 m)
- Listed weight: 235 lb (107 kg)

Career information
- High school: Hillsborough (Tampa)
- College: Syracuse
- NFL draft: 2003: 5th round, 165th overall pick

Career history
- Seattle Seahawks (2003–2004)
- Stats at Pro Football Reference

Christopher Michael Davis (born November 8, 1979) is an American former professional football player who was a fullback in the National Football League (NFL). He played college football at Syracuse and was selected by the Seattle Seahawks in the fifth round of the 2003 NFL draft.

== Early life ==
Davis attended Hillsborough High School in (Tampa, Florida) where he was a three-time letterman and team captain as a senior.

== College career ==
Davis played college football at Syracuse. After redshirting in 1998, he played the next four years. In the 2000 preseason, he changed positions from running back to fullback. Davis played in every game of his final three seasons.

Prior to the NFL draft, Davis was measured with a 4.49 second 40-yard dash, a 37 1/2-inch vertical jump, while bench pressing 430 pounds.

== Professional career ==
The Seattle Seahawks selected Davis 165th overall in the fifth round of the 2003 NFL draft via a draft pick acquired from the Green Bay Packers. He played in one game during the 2003 season before being placed on injured reserve on September 9, 2003. He was placed on injured reserve again on September 5, 2004. Davis was waived by the Seahawks on April 26, 2005.
