= 2002 Maryland Terrapins football team =

American college football season

2002 Maryland Terrapins football
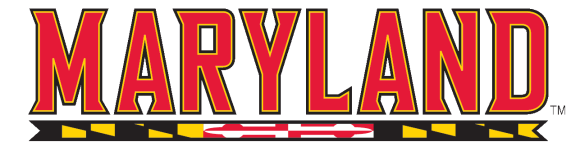

Peach Bowl champion

Peach Bowl, W 30–3 vs. Tennessee
- Conference: Atlantic Coast Conference

Ranking
- Coaches: No. 13
- AP: No. 13
- Record: 11–3 (6–2 ACC)
- Head coach: Ralph Friedgen (2nd season)
- Offensive coordinator: Charlie Taaffe (2nd season)
- Defensive coordinator: Gary Blackney (2nd season)
- Home stadium: Byrd Stadium

2002 Atlantic Coast Conference football standings
| | Conf. | | | Overall |
| Team | W | | L | W | | L |
|---|---|---|---|---|---|---|
| No. 21 Florida State $ | 7 | – | 1 | 9 | – | 5 |
| No. 22 Virginia | 6 | – | 2 | 9 | – | 5 |
| No. 13 Maryland | 6 | – | 2 | 11 | – | 3 |
| No. 12 NC State | 5 | – | 3 | 11 | – | 3 |
| Clemson | 4 | – | 4 | 7 | – | 6 |
| Georgia Tech | 4 | – | 4 | 7 | – | 6 |
| Wake Forest | 3 | – | 5 | 7 | – | 6 |
| North Carolina | 1 | – | 7 | 3 | – | 9 |
| Duke | 0 | – | 8 | 2 | – | 10 |
$ – BCS representative as conference champion; Rankings from AP Poll

The 2002 Maryland Terrapins football team represented the University of Maryland in the 2002 NCAA Division I-A football season. Led by head coach Ralph Friedgen, the Terrapins appeared in the 2002 Peach Bowl.

== Schedule ==
| Date | Time | Opponent | Rank | Site | TV | Result | Attendance |
|---|---|---|---|---|---|---|---|
| August 31 | 8:00 pm | vs. Notre Dame* | No. 21 | Giants Stadium; East Rutherford, NJ (Kickoff Classic) | ABC | L 0–22 | 72,903 |
| September 7 | 6:00 pm | Akron* | | Byrd Stadium; College Park, MD | | W 44–14 | 48,057 |
| September 14 | 7:45 pm | No. 5 Florida State | | Byrd Stadium; College Park, MD | ESPN | L 10–37 | 51,758 |
| September 21 | 6:00 pm | Eastern Michigan* | | Byrd Stadium; College Park, MD | | W 45–3 | 46,098 |
| September 28 | 6:00 pm | Wofford* | | Byrd Stadium; College Park, MD | | W 37–8 | 44,098 |
| October 5 | 12:00 pm | at West Virginia* | | Mountaineer Field; Morgantown, WV (rivalry) | ESPN2 | W 48–17 | 55,146 |
| October 17 | 7:45 pm | Georgia Tech | | Byrd Stadium; College Park, MD | ESPN | W 34–10 | 41,766 |
| October 26 | 1:00 pm | at Duke | | Wallace Wade Stadium; Durham, NC | | W 45–12 | 23,451 |
| November 2 | 1:30 pm | at North Carolina | | Kenan Memorial Stadium; Chapel Hill, NC | | W 59–7 | 44,000 |
| November 9 | 12:00 pm | No. 14 NC State^{†} | | Byrd Stadium; College Park, MD | ABC | W 24–21 | 52,915 |
| November 16 | 7:45 pm | at Clemson | No. 19 | Memorial Stadium; Clemson, SC | ESPN | W 30–12 | 74,707 |
| November 23 | 5:30 pm | at Virginia | No. 18 | Scott Stadium; Charlottesville, VA (rivalry) | ESPN2 | L 13–48 | 58,358 |
| November 30 | 12:00 pm | Wake Forest | No. 25 | Byrd Stadium; College Park, MD | ESPN | W 32–14 | 39,066 |
| December 31 | 7:30 pm | vs. Tennessee* | No. 20 | Georgia Dome; Atlanta, GA (Peach Bowl) | ESPN | W 30–3 | 68,330 |
*Non-conference game; ^{†}Homecoming; Rankings from AP Poll released prior to the game; All times are in Eastern time

== Roster ==
2002 Maryland Terrapins football team roster
Players
Coaches
Offense

| Pos. | # | Name | Class |
|---|---|---|---|
| RB | 43 | Josh Allen | Fr |
| RB | 9 | Jason Crawford | So |
| OT | 78 | Matt Crawford | Sr |
| TE | 82 | Jeff Dugan | Jr |
| TE | 87 | Ryan Flynn | So |
| QB | 14 | Sam Hollenbach | Fr |
| QB | 7 | Scott McBrien | Jr |
| FB | 5 | James Lynch | Jr |
| WR | 22 | Rich Parson | So |
| RB | 1 | Bruce Perry | Jr |

Defense

| Pos. | # | Name | Class |
|---|---|---|---|
| LB | 47 | Jon Condo | So |
| CB | 30 | Curome Cox | Jr |
| CB | 6 | Domonique Foxworth | So |
| LB | 42 | E. J. Henderson | Sr |
| LB | 52 | D'Qwell Jackson | Fr |
| LB | 32 | Leon Joe | Jr |
| LB | 45 | Shawne Merriman | Fr |
| DT | 57 | Randy Starks | Jr |
| SS | 40 | Madieu Williams | Jr |

Special teams

| Pos. | # | Name | Class |
|---|---|---|---|
| P | 16 | Brooks Barnard | Sr |
| K | 46 | Nick Novak | So |

Head coach

- Ralph Friedgen

Coordinators/assistant coaches

Legend

- (C) Team captain
- (S) Suspended
- (I) Ineligible
- Injured
- Redshirt

Roster
Last update: 2002-10-19

== Team players in the NFL ==
The following players were selected in the 2003 NFL draft.

| Player | Position | Round | Pick Overall | NFL team |
|---|---|---|---|---|
| E.J. Henderson | Linebacker | 2 | 40 | Minnesota Vikings |

== Awards and honors ==
- E.J. Henderson, Atlantic Coast Conference Defensive Player of the Year
- E.J. Henderson, Chuck Bednarik Award
- E.J. Henderson, Butkus Award
