= 2003 Sugar Bowl =

2003 Nokia Sugar Bowl
- BCS Bowl Game; 69th Sugar Bowl
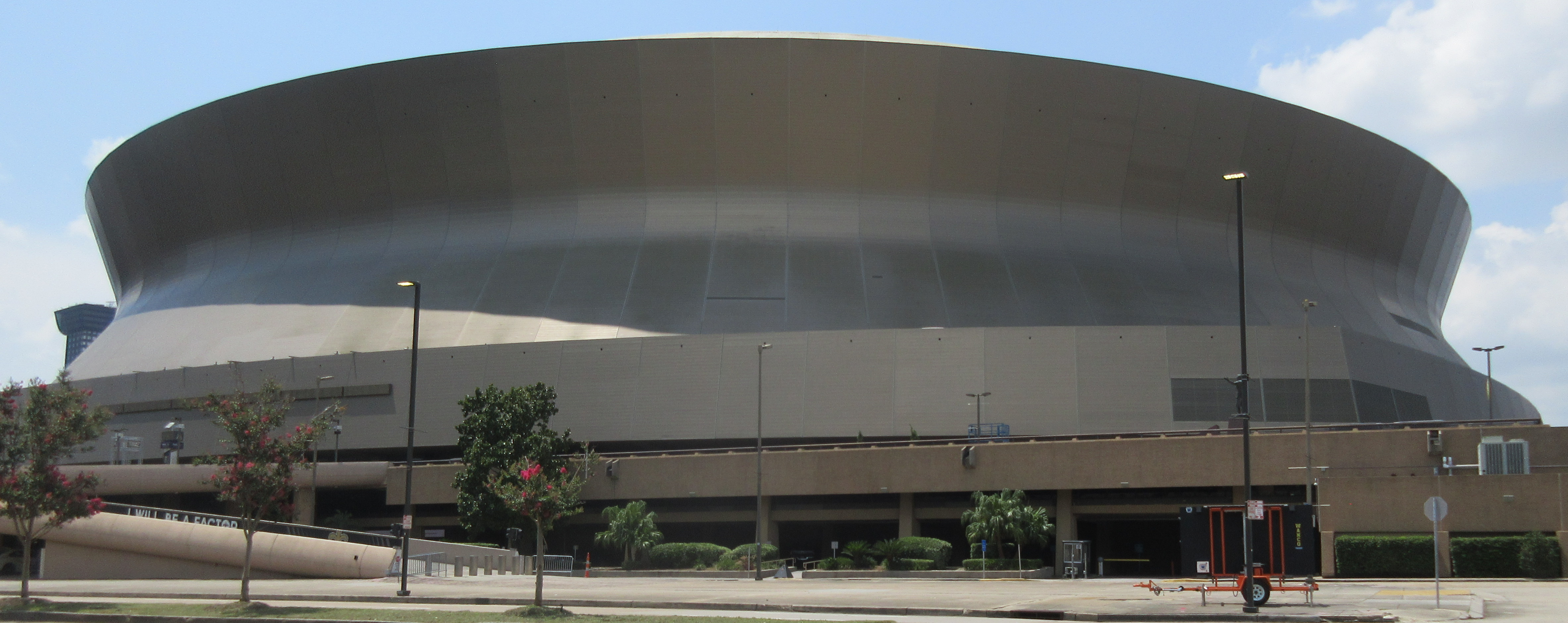
- The Louisiana Superdome in New Orleans, Louisiana, hosted the Sugar Bowl.
| Georgia Bulldogs | Florida State Seminoles |
| (12–1) | (9–4) |
| SEC | ACC |
| 26 | 13 |
| Head coach: Mark Richt | Head coach: Bobby Bowden |
| AP / Coaches / BCS; 4 / 4 / 3 | AP / Coaches / BCS; 16 / 16 / 14 |
| | 1 | 2 | 3 | 4 | Total |
|---|---|---|---|---|---|
| Georgia | 3 | 14 | 6 | 3 | 26 |
| Florida State | 0 | 7 | 6 | 0 | 13 |
- Date: January 1, 2003
- Season: 2002
- Stadium: Louisiana Superdome
- Location: New Orleans, Louisiana
- MVP: Musa Smith (RB, Georgia)
- Favorite: Georgia by 7.5
- Referee: Chuck McFerrin (Pac-10)
- Attendance: 74,269

United States TV coverage
- Network: ABC
- Announcers: Brad Nessler, Bob Griese and Lynn Swann
- Nielsen ratings: 9.2

The 2003 Sugar Bowl, a 2002–03 BCS game, was played on January 1, 2003. This 69th edition to the Sugar Bowl featured the Georgia Bulldogs, and the Florida State Seminoles. Georgia came into the game 12–1 and ranked 3rd in the BCS, whereas Florida State came into the game 9–4 and ranked 14th in the BCS. Sponsored by Nokia, the game was officially known as the Nokia Sugar Bowl.

== Teams ==
The Sugar Bowl during the BCS era usually selected the SEC champion, meaning that the winner of the SEC in 2002, Georgia received an invitation to the Sugar Bowl. Their opponent would be ACC champion Florida State.

=== Georgia Bulldogs ===
Georgia defeated Arkansas in the 2002 SEC Championship Game to earn a BCS berth as their conference's champion. Georgia entered the bowl with a 12–1 record (7–1 in conference).

=== Florida State Seminoles ===
Florida State won the ACC title outright by virtue of their 7–1 conference record. At the time, the ACC champion would go to the Orange Bowl, however the Orange Bowl chose Iowa and USC instead, leaving the Seminoles to play in the Sugar Bowl. Florida State entered the bowl with an 9–4 record (7–1 in conference).

== Game summary ==
Kicker Billy Bennett kicked a 23-yard field goal with 10 minutes left in the opening quarter to account for the quarter's only points. In the second quarter, FSU quarterback Fabian Walker threw a 5-yard slant pass to Anquan Boldin as FSU took a 7–3 lead. Florida State was driving again in the second quarter before cornerback Bruce Thornton stepped in front of a Walker pass and raced 73 yards to the opposite end zone, to give Georgia a 10–7 lead. Quarterback D.J. Shockley threw a 37-yard touchdown pass to Terrence Edwards before halftime to give the Bulldogs a 17–7 half time lead.

Bennett accounted for two more Georgia field goals in the third quarter, as Georgia posted a 23–7 lead. On the final play of the third quarter, wide receiver Boldin (who had replaced Walker) threw a 40-yard touchdown pass to Craphonso Thorpe. The ensuing two-point conversion failed, and the lead was 23–13. Bennett kicked another field goal in the fourth quarter, as Georgia held off Florida State. Georgia's running back Musa Smith won the MVP award.

Seminoles quarterback Chris Rix and defensive tackle Darnell Dockett did not play after being suspended for the game. Rix had missed a final exam, which pressed Walker into his first collegiate start. Dockett pled guilty to a misdemeanor theft charge.

=== Scoring summary ===
Scoring summary

| Quarter | Time | Drive | | | Team | Scoring information | Score | |
| Quarter | Time | Plays | Yards | TOP | Team | Scoring information | UGA | FSU |
|---|---|---|---|---|---|---|---|---|
| 1 | 4:19 | 9 | 62 | 4:04 | UGA | 23-yard field goal by Billy Bennett | 3 | 0 |
| 2 | 13:41 | 8 | 69 | 3:42 | FSU | Anquan Boldin 5-yard touchdown reception from Fabian Walker, Xavier Beitia kick good | 3 | 7 |
| 2 | 6:41 | 1 | 71 | 0:10 | UGA | Interception returned 71 yards for touchdown by Bruce Thornton, Billy Bennett kick good | 10 | 7 |
| 2 | 3:43 | 1 | 37 | 0:07 | UGA | Terrence Edwards 37-yard touchdown reception from D.J. Shockley, Billy Bennett kick good | 17 | 7 |
| 3 | 11:06 | 9 | 68 | 3:54 | UGA | 42-yard field goal by Billy Bennett | 20 | 7 |
| 3 | 8:49 | 4 | 9 | 2:04 | UGA | 25-yard field goal by Billy Bennett | 23 | 7 |
| 3 | 0:00 | 5 | 66 | 2:29 | FSU | Craphonso Thorpe 40-yard touchdown reception from Anquan Boldin, 2-point run failed | 23 | 13 |
| 4 | 10:17 | 11 | 62 | 4:43 | UGA | 35-yard field goal by Billy Bennett | 26 | 13 |
| "TOP" = time of possession. For other American football terms, see Glossary of American football. | | | | | | | 26 | 13 |

=== Statistics ===
| | 1 | 2 | 3 | 4 | Total |
|---|---|---|---|---|---|
| No. 3 Bulldogs | 3 | 14 | 6 | 3 | 26 |
| No. 14 Seminoles | 7 | 0 | 6 | 0 | 13 |

| Statistics | UGA | FSU |
|---|---|---|
| First downs | 11 | 18 |
| Plays–yards | 51–276 | 67–262 |
| Rushes–yards | 36–151 | 41–115 |
| Passing yards | 125 | 147 |
| Passing: comp–att–int | 10–15–0 | 13–26–2 |
| Time of possession | 26:09 | 33:51 |

| Team | Category | Player | Statistics |
|---|---|---|---|
| Georgia | Passing | David Greene | 9/14, 88 yds |
| Georgia | Rushing | Musa Smith | 23 car, 145 yds |
| Georgia | Receiving | Terrence Edwards | 3 rec, 60 yds, 1 TD |
| Florida State | Passing | Anquan Boldin | 6/14, 78 yds, 1 TD |
| Florida State | Rushing | Leon Washington | 10 car, 48 yds |
| Florida State | Receiving | Craphonso Thorpe | 1 rec, 40 yds, 1 TD |

== Aftermath ==
Georgia completed the season 13–1. They ranked #3 in both major polls. Florida State finished the season 9–5 and #21/#24 in the polls.
