= Will Hunter =

American football player (born 1979)

Profile
- Position: Safety

Personal information
- Born: March 24, 1979 (age 47); Chester, Pennsylvania, U.S.
- Listed height: 5 ft 10 in (1.78 m)
- Listed weight: 190 lb (86 kg)

Career information
- College: Syracuse University

Career history
- 2003: New York Jets*
- 2004: Cologne Centurions
- 2004: Tampa Bay Buccaneers*
- 2004: New York Giants*
- 2004–2006: Minnesota Vikings
- * Offseason or practice squad member only
- Stats at Pro Football Reference

Will Hunter (born March 24, 1979) is an American former professional football player who was a safety for the Minnesota Vikings of the National Football League (NFL).

== Early life ==
Hunter attended Chester High School in Chester, Pennsylvania. While attending Chester High, Hunter was a Super Prep and Tom Lemming All-Regional selection, he was a third-team All-State, All-Del val and All-Area selection, he was also selected for the "Big 33" Pennsylvania vs. Ohio All-Star Game. He played in the Hero Bowl, which is the Delaware County All-Star game. In his senior year, with six interceptions, 20 pass break-ups, 25 unassisted tackles, 45 assisted tackles, 32 receptions for 628 yards, and six touchdowns.

== College career ==
Switching around between the Safety and Cornerback positions, Hunter was a four-year letter-winner for Syracuse University. He was team Captain of the Orangemen his senior year. He was named to the fall Director's Honor Roll 2000–2001, he received the Coach Mac Award (awarded for Intensity, Focus, Effort, and Positive Attitude on the gridiron), and was selected to the "Grid Iron Classic" all-star game. In his college career, he recorded 156 total tackles, 3 interceptions (1 returned for touchdown), 10 sacks, 21 pass deflections, 5 forced fumbles, and 6 fumble recoveries. He ran a 4.57s 40-yard dash, 37.5 vertical jump, he weighed 195, benched 395, and squatted 465.

== Professional career ==
Hunter played briefly with the New York Jets, Tampa Bay Buccaneers, and New York Giants before ending up with the Minnesota Vikings.

== Coaching career ==
He worked as defensive coordinator for Onondaga Central High School. He was then Assistant Head Coach Cortland Bulldogs, Semi-Professional Organization. He was also Defensive Backs Coach Cortland State Red Dragons, NCAA Division III, New Jersey Athletic Conference (NJAC).
