= 2002 West Virginia Mountaineers football team =

American college football season

2002 West Virginia Mountaineers football

Continental Tire Bowl, L 22–48 vs. Virginia
- Conference: Big East Conference

Ranking
- Coaches: No. 20
- AP: No. 25
- Record: 9–4 (6–1 Big East)
- Head coach: Rich Rodriguez (2nd season)
- Offensive scheme: Spread option
- Co-defensive coordinators: Jeff Casteel (1st season); Todd Graham (1st season)
- Base defense: 3–3–5
- Home stadium: Mountaineer Field

2002 Big East Conference football standings
	Conf.			Overall
Team	W		L	W		L
No. 2 Miami (FL) $	7	–	0	12	–	1
No. 25 West Virginia	6	–	1	9	–	4
No. 19 Pittsburgh	5	–	2	9	–	4
No. 18 Virginia Tech	3	–	4	10	–	4
Boston College	3	–	4	9	–	4
Temple	2	–	5	4	–	8
Syracuse	2	–	5	4	–	8
Rutgers	0	–	7	1	–	11
$ – BCS representative as conference champion; Rankings from AP Poll

The 2002 West Virginia Mountaineers football team represented West Virginia University as a member of the Big East Conference during the 2002 NCAA Division I-A football season. Led by second-year head coach Rich Rodriguez, the Mountaineers compiled an overall record of 9–4 with a mark of 6–1 in conference play, placing second in the Big East. West Virginia was invited the Continental Tire Bowl, where the Mountaineers lost to Virginia. The team played home games at Mountaineer Field in Morgantown, West Virginia.

West Virginia'ss 9–4 record marked the biggest one-season turnaround in Big East history, after posting a 3–8 record the previous season.

== Schedule ==
Date	Time	Opponent	Rank	Site	TV	Result	Attendance	Source
August 31	6:00 p.m.	Chattanooga*		Mountaineer Field; Morgantown, WV	MSN	W 56–7	54,455	
September 7	12:00 p.m.	at No. 25 Wisconsin*		Camp Randall Stadium; Madison, WI	ESPN Plus	L 17–34	76,320	
September 14	7:00 p.m.	at Cincinnati*		Nippert Stadium; Cincinnati, OH	MSN	W 35–32	28,806	
September 28	12:00 p.m.	East Carolina*		Mountaineer Field; Morgantown, WV	ESPN Plus	W 37–17	54,497	
October 5	12:00 p.m.	Maryland*		Mountaineer Field; Morgantown, WV	ESPN2	L 17–48	55,146	
October 12	3:30 p.m.	at Rutgers		Rutgers Stadium; Piscataway, NJ	ESPN Plus	W 40–0	12,973	
October 19	12:00 p.m.	Syracuse		Mountaineer Field; Morgantown, WV (rivalry)	ESPN Plus	W 34–7	45,088	
October 26	12:00 p.m.	No. 1 Miami (FL)		Mountaineer Field; Morgantown, WV	ESPN2	L 23–40	56,817	
November 2	12:00 p.m.	at Temple		Veterans Stadium; Philadelphia, PA		W 46–20	15,042	
November 9	12:00 p.m.	Boston College		Mountaineer Field; Morgantown, WV	ESPN	W 24–14	48,474	
November 20	7:00 p.m.	at No. 13 Virginia Tech		Lane Stadium; Blacksburg, VA (rivalry)	ESPN2	W 21–18	62,723	
November 30	1:00 p.m.	at No. 17 Pittsburgh	No. 24	Heinz Field; Pittsburgh PA (Backyard Brawl)	ABC	W 24–17	66,731	
December 28	11:00 a.m.	vs. Virginia*	No. 15	Ericsson Stadium; Charlotte, NC (Continental Tire Bowl)	ESPN2	L 22–48	73,535	
*Non-conference game; Rankings from AP Poll released prior to the game; All times are in Eastern time

== Season summary ==
Rasheed Marshall was the starting quarterback for the Mountaineers. He led the team with 1616 passing yards and 9 touchdowns. Leading the team in rushing was Avon Cobourne with 1710 net yards. Miquelle Henderson led the team in receiving with 40 receptions for 496 yards.

The home opener for the West Virginia Mountaineers was against Chattanooga, in which the Mountaineers won handily 56–7. In the second game of the season, WVU played at Wisconsin, where they lost 34–17. They then traveled to Cincinnati, where they beat the Bearcats 35–32.

They then defeated East Carolina by a 37–17 margin at home. They got demolished at home by ACC powerhouse Maryland 17–48. They then traveled to Rutgers, where they won handily 40–0. The next game was a 34–17 home win over Syracuse.

They played host to the number 1 team in the land, the Miami Hurricanes, but lost by a 23–40 count. They played at Temple, and blew out the Owls 46–20. A home game against Boston College resulted in a 24–14 Mountaineer victory. Their next game was against Virginia Tech, where they won 21–18, in Blacksburg.

On November 30, they played at archrival Pitt in the Backyard Brawl, and won 24–17. In the Continental Tire Bowl, they lost to the Virginia Cavaliers 22–48 to finish the season.

== Roster ==
2002 West Virginia Mountaineers football team roster
Players
Coaches
Offense

Pos.	#	Name	Class
WR	85	Dee Alston	Fr
C	51	Matt Ameri	Fr
WR	21	Phil Braxton	Sr
RB	22	Avon Cobourne	Sr
WR	83	Miquelle Henderson	So
FB	36	Adam King	Jr
QB	18	Rasheed Marshall	So
WR	86	John Pennington	Jr
OT	71	Justin Williams	So
RB	3	Quincy Wilson	Jr

Defense

Pos.	#	Name	Class
LB	32	Ben Collins	Sr
DB	19	Lance Frazier	Jr
DB	9	Adam Jones	Fr
DE	92	Ben Lynch	So
LB	6	Grant Wiley	Jr

Special teams

Pos.	#	Name	Class
LS	57	Chad Lavender	So

Head coach

- Rich Rodriguez

Coordinators/assistant coaches

Legend

- (C) Team captain
- (S) Suspended
- (I) Ineligible
- Injured
- Redshirt

Roster

== Team players in the NFL ==
Player	Position	Round	Pick	NFL club
Lance Nimmo	Tackle	4	130	Tampa Bay Buccaneers
James Davis	Linebcaker	5	144	Detroit Lions
