= 2002 Boston College Eagles football team =

American college football season

2002 Boston College Eagles football
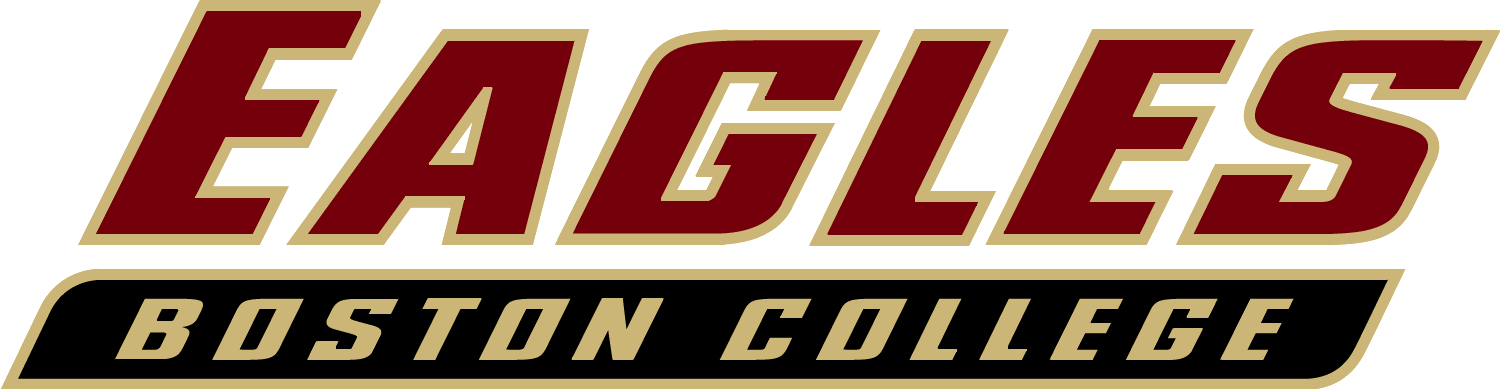

Motor City Bowl champion

Motor City Bowl, W 51–25 vs. Toledo
- Conference: Big East Conference
- Record: 9–4 (3–4 Big East)
- Head coach: Tom O'Brien (6th season)
- Offensive coordinator: Dana Bible (4th season)
- Offensive scheme: Pro-style
- Defensive coordinator: Frank Spaziani (4th season)
- Base defense: 4–3
- Captains: Vinny Ciurciu; Antonio Garay; Brian St. Pierre
- Home stadium: Alumni Stadium

2002 Big East Conference football standings
	Conf.			Overall
Team	W		L	W		L
No. 2 Miami (FL) $	7	–	0	12	–	1
No. 25 West Virginia	6	–	1	9	–	4
No. 19 Pittsburgh	5	–	2	9	–	4
No. 18 Virginia Tech	3	–	4	10	–	4
Boston College	3	–	4	9	–	4
Temple	2	–	5	4	–	8
Syracuse	2	–	5	4	–	8
Rutgers	0	–	7	1	–	11
$ – BCS representative as conference champion; Rankings from AP Poll

The 2002 Boston College Eagles football team represented Boston College during the 2002 NCAA Division I-A football season. Boston College was a member of the Big East Conference. The Eagles played their home games at Alumni Stadium in Chestnut Hill, Massachusetts, which has been their home stadium since 1957.

== Schedule ==
Date	Time	Opponent	Site	TV	Result	Attendance
August 31	12:00 p.m.	Connecticut*	Alumni Stadium; Chestnut Hill, MA	ESPN+	W 24–16	40,066
September 7	3:30 p.m.	Stanford*	Alumni Stadium; Chestnut Hill, MA	ESPN2	W 34–27	41,065
September 21	7:45 p.m.	at No. 1 Miami	Miami Orange Bowl; Miami, FL	ESPN	L 6–38	73,622
September 28	12:00 p.m.	Central Michigan*	Alumni Stadium; Chestnut Hill, MA		W 43–0	41,826
October 10	7:45 p.m.	No. 4 Virginia Tech	Alumni Stadium; Chestnut Hill, MA (rivalry)	ESPN	L 23–28	42,826
October 19	12:00 p.m.	Navy*	Alumni Stadium; Chestnut Hill, MA		W 46-21	41,322
October 26	12:00 p.m.	at Pittsburgh	Heinz Field; Pittsburgh, PA		L 16–19 ^{OT}	45,060
November 2	2:30 p.m.	at No. 4 Notre Dame*	Notre Dame Stadium; Notre Dame, IN (Holy War)	NBC	W 14–7	80,795
November 9	12:00 p.m.	at West Virginia	Mountaineer Field; Morgantown, WV	ESPN	L 14–24	48,474
November 16	12:00 p.m.	Syracuse	Alumni Stadium; Chestnut Hill, MA	ESPN+	W 41–20	36,221
November 23	12:00 p.m.	at Temple	Veterans Stadium; Philadelphia, PA		W 36–14	14,278
November 30	12:00 p.m.	Rutgers	Alumni Stadium; Chestnut Hill, MA	ESPN+	W 44–14	33,786
December 26	5:00 p.m.	vs. Toledo*	Ford Field; Detroit, MI (Motor City Bowl)	ESPN	W 51–25	51,872
*Non-conference game; Rankings from AP Poll released prior to the game; All times are in Eastern time

== Roster ==
2002 Boston College Eagles football team roster
Players
Coaches
Offense

Pos.	#	Name	Class
QB	2	Brian St. Pierre	Sr
WR	5	Grant Adams	So
QB	15	Quinton Porter	Fr
OT	72	Jeremy Trueblood	Fr
G	76	Chris Snee	Jr
C	77	Dan Koppen	Sr
TE	89	Sean Ryan	Jr

Defense

Pos.	#	Name	Class
CB	1	Will Blackmon	Fr
S	24	Ralph Parent	Sr
LB	40	Vinny Ciurciu	Sr
LB	44	J. D. Schmidt	Jr
LB	45	Josh Ott	Jr
DE	85	Antonio Garay	Sr

Special teams

Pos.	#	Name	Class

Head coach

- Tom O'Brien

Coordinators/assistant coaches

Legend

- (C) Team captain
- (S) Suspended
- (I) Ineligible
- Injured
- Redshirt

Roster
Last update: 2002-10-01

== Team players in the NFL ==
Player	Position	Round	Pick	NFL club
Brian St. Pierre	Quarterback	5	163	Pittsburgh Steelers
Dan Koppen	Center	5	164	New England Patriots
Antonio Garay	Nose tackle	6	195	Cleveland Browns
