= 2002 Pittsburgh Panthers football team =

American college football season

2002 Pittsburgh Panthers football

Insight Bowl champion

Insight Bowl, W 38–13 vs. Oregon State
- Conference: Big East Conference

Ranking
- Coaches: No. 18
- AP: No. 19
- Record: 9–4 (5–2 Big East)
- Head coach: Walt Harris (6th season)
- Offensive coordinator: J. D. Brookhart (3rd season)
- Offensive scheme: West Coast
- Defensive coordinator: Paul Rhoads (3rd season)
- Base defense: Multiple 4–3
- Home stadium: Heinz Field

2002 Big East Conference football standings
	Conf.			Overall
Team	W		L	W		L
No. 2 Miami (FL) $	7	–	0	12	–	1
No. 25 West Virginia	6	–	1	9	–	4
No. 19 Pittsburgh	5	–	2	9	–	4
No. 18 Virginia Tech	3	–	4	10	–	4
Boston College	3	–	4	9	–	4
Temple	2	–	5	4	–	8
Syracuse	2	–	5	4	–	8
Rutgers	0	–	7	1	–	11
$ – BCS representative as conference champion; Rankings from AP Poll

The 2002 Pittsburgh Panthers football team represented the University of Pittsburgh in the 2002 NCAA Division I-A football season.

== Schedule ==
Date	Time	Opponent	Rank	Site	TV	Result	Attendance	Source
August 31	7:00 p.m.	Ohio*		Heinz Field; Pittsburgh, PA		W 27–14	41,579	
September 7	12:00 p.m.	No. 20 Texas A&M*		Heinz Field; Pittsburgh, PA	ESPN	L 12–14	45,489	
September 14	7:00 p.m.	at UAB*		Legion Field; Birmingham, AL		W 26–20	15,027	
September 21	12:00 p.m.	Rutgers		Heinz Field; Pittsburgh, PA	ESPN Plus	W 23–3	32,519	
September 28	1:30 p.m.	Toledo*		Heinz Field; Pittsburgh, PA		W 37–19	39,713	
October 5	12:00 p.m.	at Syracuse		Carrier Dome; Syracuse, NY (rivalry)	ESPN Plus	W 48–24	39,947	
October 12	2:30 p.m.	at No. 8 Notre Dame*		Notre Dame Stadium; Notre Dame, IN (rivalry)	NBC	L 6–14	80,795	
October 26	12:00 p.m.	Boston College^{†}		Heinz Field; Pittsburgh, PA	ESPN Plus	W 19–16 ^{OT}	45,060	
November 2	7:30 p.m.	at No. 3 Virginia Tech		Lane Stadium; Blacksburg, VA	ESPN2	W 28–21	64,971	
November 9	12:00 p.m.	Temple	No. 22	Heinz Field; Pittsburgh, PA	ESPN Plus	W 29–22	39,880	
November 21	7:30 p.m.	at No. 1 Miami (FL)	No. 17	Miami Orange Bowl; Miami, FL	ESPN	L 21–28	64,897	
November 30	1:00 p.m.	No. 24 West Virginia	No. 17	Heinz Field; Pittsburgh, PA (Backyard Brawl)	ABC	L 17–24	66,731	
December 26	8:30 p.m.	vs. Oregon State*	No. 24	Bank One Ballpark; Phoenix, AZ (Insight Bowl)	ESPN	W 38–13	40,533	
*Non-conference game; ^{†}Homecoming; Rankings from AP Poll released prior to the game; All times are in Eastern time

== Roster ==
2002 Pittsburgh Panthers football team roster
Players
Coaches
Offense

Pos.	#	Name	Class
OL	77	Bryan Anderson	Sr
WR	85	Princell Brockenbrough	Jr
WR	1	Larry Fitzgerald	Fr
RB	25	Brandon Miree	Jr
OT	75	Matt Morgan	Jr
QB	10	Tyler Palko	Fr
RB	32	Lousaka Polite	Jr
QB	12	Rod Rutherford	Jr
TE	83	Kris Wilson	Jr

Defense

Pos.	#	Name	Class
LB	15	Brian Beinecke	Sr
DB	22	Reggie Carter	Fr
DB	5	Torrie Cox	Sr
LB	51	Gerald Hayes	Sr
DB	19	Shawntae Spencer	Jr

Special teams

Pos.	#	Name	Class
P	36	Andy Lee	Jr

Head coach

- Walt Harris

Coordinators/assistant coaches

Legend

- (C) Team captain
- (S) Suspended
- (I) Ineligible
- Injured
- Redshirt

Roster
Last update: 2002-10-15

== Coaching staff ==
2002 Pittsburgh Panthers football staff
Coaching staff: Walt Harris – Head coach; Bob Junko – Assistant head coach/defensive tackles; J.D. Brookhart – Offensive coordinator/Wide receivers; Paul Rhoads – Defensive coordinator/secondary; David Blackwell – Linebackers; Curtis Bray – Defensive ends; Bryan Deal – Recruiting coordinator/Specialists; Tom Freeman – Offensive line/run game coordinator; Bob Ligashesky – Tight ends/Special teams; Shawn Simms – Running backs	Support staff: Chris LaSala – Assistant Athletic Director/football operations; Matt Williamson – Recruiting Assistant; Mark Nori – Graduate assistant; Adam Waugh – Graduate assistant	Strength and conditioning staff: Dave Kennedy – Strength and conditioning coach; Dave Langworthy – Assistant strength and conditioning coach

== Team players drafted into the NFL ==
Player	Position	Round	Pick	NFL club
Gerald Hayes	Linebacker	3	70	Arizona Cardinals
Torrie Cox	Defensive back	6	205	Tampa Bay Buccaneers
Bryan Anderson	Guard	7	261	Chicago Bears
