= 2002 Virginia Tech Hokies football team =

American college football season

2002 Virginia Tech Hokies football

San Francisco Bowl champion

San Francisco Bowl, W 20–13 vs. Air Force
- Conference: Big East Conference

Ranking
- Coaches: No. 14
- AP: No. 18
- Record: 10–4 (3–4 Big East)
- Head coach: Frank Beamer (16th season)
- Offensive coordinator: Bryan Stinespring (1st season)
- Offensive scheme: Pro-style
- Defensive coordinator: Bud Foster (8th season)
- Base defense: 4–4
- Home stadium: Lane Stadium

2002 Big East Conference football standings
	Conf.			Overall
Team	W		L	W		L
No. 2 Miami (FL) $	7	–	0	12	–	1
No. 25 West Virginia	6	–	1	9	–	4
No. 19 Pittsburgh	5	–	2	9	–	4
No. 18 Virginia Tech	3	–	4	10	–	4
Boston College	3	–	4	9	–	4
Temple	2	–	5	4	–	8
Syracuse	2	–	5	4	–	8
Rutgers	0	–	7	1	–	11
$ – BCS representative as conference champion; Rankings from AP Poll

The 2002 Virginia Tech Hokies football team represented the Virginia Tech in the 2002 NCAA Division I-A football season. The team's head coach was Frank Beamer.

== Schedule ==
Date	Time	Opponent	Rank	Site	TV	Result	Attendance
August 25	2:30 p.m.	Arkansas State*	No. 16	Lane Stadium; Blacksburg, VA (Hispanic College Fund Football Classic)	ESPN+	W 63–7	54,016
September 1	2:30 p.m.	No. 14 LSU*	No. 16	Lane Stadium; Blacksburg, VA	ABC	W 26–8	65,049
September 12	7:45 p.m.	No. 16 Marshall*	No. 11	Lane Stadium; Blacksburg, VA	ESPN	W 47–21	65,049
September 21	3:30 p.m.	at No. 19 Texas A&M*	No. 7	Kyle Field; College Station, TX	ABC	W 13–3	83,746
September 28	12:00 p.m.	at Western Michigan*	No. 5	Waldo Stadium; Kalamazoo, MI	ESPN+	W 30–0	27,218
October 10	7:45 p.m.	at Boston College	No. 4	Alumni Stadium; Chestnut Hill, MA (rivalry)	ESPN	W 28–23	42,826
October 19	1:00 p.m.	Rutgers	No. 3	Lane Stadium; Blacksburg, VA	PPV	W 35–14	64,907
October 26	1:00 p.m.	Temple	No. 3	Lane Stadium; Blacksburg, VA	PPV	W 20–10	64,937
November 2	7:30 p.m.	Pittsburgh	No. 3	Lane Stadium; Blacksburg, VA	ESPN2	L 21–28	64,971
November 9	3:30 p.m.	at Syracuse	No. 8	Carrier Dome; Syracuse, NY	ESPN	L 42–50 ^{3OT}	48,239
November 20	7:00 p.m.	West Virginia	No. 13	Lane Stadium; Blacksburg, VA (Black Diamond Trophy)	ESPN2	L 18–21	62,723
November 30	3:30 p.m.	Virginia*	No. 22	Lane Stadium; Blacksburg, VA (Commonwealth Cup)	ESPN	W 21–9	65,097
December 7	1:00 p.m.	at No. 1 Miami (FL)	No. 18	Miami Orange Bowl; Miami, FL (rivalry)	ABC	L 45–56	76,108
December 31	8:30 p.m.	vs. Air Force*	No. 18	Pacific Bell Park; San Francisco, CA (San Francisco Bowl)	ESPN2	W 20–13	25,966
*Non-conference game; Rankings from AP Poll released prior to the game; All times are in Eastern time

== Rankings ==
Ranking movements Legend: ██ Increase in ranking ██ Decrease in ranking — = Not ranked
	Week																	
Poll	Pre	1	2	3	4	5	6	7	8	9	10	11	12	13	14	15	16	Final
AP	16	16	12	11	7	5	4	4	3	3	3	8	13	13	22	18	21	18
Coaches Poll	16	16	10	9	7	5	4	4	3	3	3	7	13	12	19	14	19	14
BCS	Not released									4	6	10	—	—	—	—	—	Not released

== Roster ==
2002 Virginia Tech Hokies football team roster
Players
Coaches
Offense

Pos.	#	Name	Class
RB	44	John Candelas	Fr
OT	57	Anthony Davis	Sr
OT	79	Jon Dunn	So
RB	43	Doug Easlick	Jr
C	64	Jake Grove	Jr
RB	31/32	Cedric Humes	Fr
RB	25/7	Kevin Jones	So
TE	90	Jeff King	Fr
C	66	Will Montgomery	Fr
QB	11	Grant Noel	Sr
RB	22	Lee Suggs	Sr
G	74	Luke Owens	So
QB	5	Marcus Vick	Fr
WR	19	Ernest Wilford	Jr
WR	12	Richard Johnson	So

Defense

Pos.	#	Name	Class
LB	42	James Anderson	Fr
S	21	Michael Crawford	Jr
DE	28	Lamar Cobb	Sr
DE	99	Cols Colas	Jr
LB	33	Chad Cooper	So
DE	95	Jim Davis	Jr
S	8	Vincent Fuller	So
CB	4	DeAngelo Hall	So
DB	27	Justin Hamilton	Fr
DT	56	Jonathan Lewis	Sr
DB	35	Willie Pile	Sr
DE	55	Darryl Tapp	Fr
CB	2	Ronyell Whitaker	Sr
CB	17	Garnell Wilds	Jr
CB	2	Jimmy Willams	Fr

Special teams

Pos.	#	Name	Class
K	49	Carter Warley	Jr

Head coach

- Frank Beamer

Coordinators/assistant coaches

Legend

- (C) Team captain
- (S) Suspended
- (I) Ineligible
- Injured
- Redshirt

Roster

== Team players in the NFL ==
Player	Position	Round	Pick	NFL club
Lee Suggs	Running back	4	115	Cleveland Browns
Willie Pile	Safety	7	252	Kansas City Chiefs
