= Curome Cox =

American football player (born 1981)

Virginia Cavaliers
- Title: Defensive backs coach & defensive passing game coordinator

Personal information
- Born: February 28, 1981 (age 45); New York, New York, U.S.
- Listed height: 6 ft 1 in (1.85 m)
- Listed weight: 204 lb (93 kg)

Career information
- High school: Gonzaga College (Washington, D.C.)
- College: Maryland
- NFL draft: 2004: undrafted

Career history

Playing
- Atlanta Falcons (2004)*; Denver Broncos (2004–2007); Houston Texans (2007); New Orleans Saints (2008)*
- * Offseason or practice squad member only

Coaching
- Maryland (2010–2012) Graduate assistant; Coastal Carolina (2013–2016) Defensive backs & special teams coach; UConn (2017–2018) Defensive backs coach; Albany (2019) Cornerbacks coach; Air Force (2020–2021) Defensive backs coach; Virginia (2022–present) Defensive backs coach & defensive passing game coordinator

Career NFL statistics
- Total tackles: 59
- Fumble recoveries: 2
- Pass deflections: 10
- Interceptions: 2
- Stats at Pro Football Reference

Curome Cox (born February 28, 1981) is an American football coach and former player who is the defensive backs coach and defensive passing game coordinator for the Virginia Cavaliers, a position he has held since 2022. He played as a safety in the National Football League (NFL). He played college football for the Maryland Terrapins and was signed by the Atlanta Falcons as an undrafted free agent in 2004.

Cox was also a member of the Denver Broncos, Houston Texans and New Orleans Saints.

== Early life ==
Curome attended Gonzaga College High School in Washington, D.C., before moving onto the Maryland Terrapins.

== Professional career ==
=== Denver Broncos ===
Cox made an interception against the San Diego Chargers in the final regular season game. Due to injuries, Curome Cox has been thrust into the spotlight as a starting safety on the vaunted Broncos defense, next to John Lynch. On November 6, 2007, the Broncos released him.

=== Houston Texans ===
He signed with the Houston Texans on November 13. The Texans released him on June 13, 2008.

=== New Orleans Saints ===
On July 30, 2008, Cox was signed by the New Orleans Saints.
