= 2002 Miami Hurricanes football team =

American college football season

2002 Miami Hurricanes football

Big East champion Florida Cup champion

Fiesta Bowl (BCS NCG), L 24–31^{2OT} vs. Ohio State
- Conference: Big East Conference

Ranking
- Coaches: No. 2
- AP: No. 2
- Record: 12–1 (7–0 Big East)
- Head coach: Larry Coker (2nd season)
- Offensive coordinator: Rob Chudzinski (2nd season)
- Offensive scheme: Pro-style
- Defensive coordinator: Randy Shannon (2nd season)
- Base defense: 4–3 Cover 2
- Home stadium: Miami Orange Bowl (Capacity: 74,476)

2002 Big East Conference football standings
	Conf.			Overall
Team	W		L	W		L
No. 2 Miami (FL) $	7	–	0	12	–	1
No. 25 West Virginia	6	–	1	9	–	4
No. 19 Pittsburgh	5	–	2	9	–	4
No. 18 Virginia Tech	3	–	4	10	–	4
Boston College	3	–	4	9	–	4
Temple	2	–	5	4	–	8
Syracuse	2	–	5	4	–	8
Rutgers	0	–	7	1	–	11
$ – BCS representative as conference champion; Rankings from AP Poll

The 2002 Miami Hurricanes football team represented the University of Miami during the 2002 NCAA Division I-A football season. It was the Hurricanes' 77th season of football and 12th as a member of the Big East Conference. The Hurricanes were led by second-year head coach Larry Coker and played their home games at the Orange Bowl. They finished the season 12–1 overall and 7–0 in the Big East to finish as conference champion. They were invited to the Fiesta Bowl, which served as the BCS National Championship Game, and lost against Ohio State, 31–24, in double overtime. This would mark the last time the team played in a national championship game until the 2025 season.

== Schedule ==
Date	Time	Opponent	Rank	Site	TV	Result	Attendance	Source
August 31	7:00 pm	No. 16 (I-AA) Florida A&M*	No. 1	Miami Orange Bowl; Miami, FL	PPV	W 63–17	68,548	
September 7	5:15 pm	at No. 6 Florida*	No. 1	Ben Hill Griffin Stadium; Gainesville, FL (rivalry, College GameDay)	CBS	W 41–16	85,777	
September 14	12:00 pm	at Temple	No. 1	Franklin Field; Philadelphia, PA	ESPN Plus	W 44–21	33,169	
September 21	7:45 pm	Boston College	No. 1	Miami Orange Bowl; Miami, FL	ESPN	W 38–6	73,622	
October 5	7:00 pm	Connecticut*	No. 1	Miami Orange Bowl; Miami, FL	PPV	W 48–14	52,131	
October 12	12:00 pm	No. 9 Florida State*	No. 1	Miami Orange Bowl; Miami, FL (rivalry)	ABC	W 28–27	81,927	
October 26	12:00 pm	at West Virginia	No. 1	Mountaineer Field; Morgantown, WV	ESPN2	W 40–23	56,817	
November 2	12:00 pm	at Rutgers	No. 1	Rutgers Stadium; Piscataway, NJ	ESPN Plus	W 42–17	27,222	
November 9	3:30 pm	at Tennessee*	No. 2	Neyland Stadium; Knoxville, TN (College GameDay)	CBS	W 26–3	107,745	
November 21	7:30 pm	No. 17 Pittsburgh	No. 1	Miami Orange Bowl; Miami, FL	ESPN	W 28–21	64,897	
November 30	1:00 pm	at Syracuse	No. 1	Carrier Dome; Syracuse, NY	ABC	W 49–7	45,679	
December 7	1:00 pm	No. 18 Virginia Tech	No. 1	Miami Orange Bowl; Miami, FL (rivalry)	ABC	W 56–45	76,108	
January 3	8:00 pm	vs. No. 2 Ohio State*	No. 1	Sun Devil Stadium; Tempe, AZ (Fiesta Bowl—BCS National Championship Game)	ABC	L 24–31 ^{2OT}	77,502	
*Non-conference game; Rankings from AP Poll released prior to the game; All times are in Eastern time

== Rankings ==
Ranking movements Legend: ██ Increase in ranking ██ Decrease in ranking т = Tied with team above or below ( ) = First-place votes
	Week																	
Poll	Pre	1	2	3	4	5	6	7	8	9	10	11	12	13	14	15	16	Final
AP	1 (27)	1т (27)	1 (34)	1 (68)	1 (68)	1 (69)	1 (71)	1 (73)	1 (65)	1 (61)	1 (59)	2 (32)	1 (74)	1 (74)	1 (71)	1 (73)	1 (74)	2
Coaches	1 (34)	1 (42)	1 (49)	1 (58)	1 (58)	1 (59)	1 (59)	1 (60)	1 (58)	1 (55)	1 (53)	1 (47)	1 (61)	1 (61)	1 (60)	1 (60)	1 (61)	2
BCS	Not released									2	2	3	2	1	1	1	1	Not released

== Preseason ==
Miami had just come off a national championship season. Many of the starters left for the NFL, but a few key players, including quarterback Ken Dorsey, wide receiver Andre Johnson, and linebackers Jonathan Vilma and D. J. Williams returned. Despite the loss of numerous starters, Miami was still ranked 1st in the preseason coaches poll.

=== Preseason awards ===
- Andre Johnson- Blietnikoff Award Watch List
- Ken Dorsey- Davey O'Brien Award Watch List, Walter Camp Player of the Year Award candidate
- Brett Romberg- Rimington Trophy Watch List, Outland Trophy Watch List
- Sherko Haji-Rasouli (OG)- Outland Trophy Watch List
- William Joseph (DT)- Outland Trophy Watch List
- Matt Walters (DT)- Outland Trophy Watch List
- Todd Sievers- Groza Award Preseason Watch List

== Game summaries ==
=== Vs. Ohio State (Fiesta Bowl) ===
Ohio State vs. Miami (FL)

Team	1	2	3	4	OT	Total
• No. 2 Buckeyes	0	14	3	0	14	31
No. 1 Hurricanes	7	0	7	3	7	24

- Date: January 3
- Location: Sun Devil Stadium, Tempe, Arizona
- Game start: 8:00 PM EST
- Elapsed time: 3:56
- Game attendance: 77,502
- Game weather: 70°, beautiful, wind W 9 mph
- Referee: Randy Christal
- TV announcers (ABC): Keith Jackson, Dan Fouts, Lynn Swann, & Todd Harris

== Personnel ==
=== Roster ===
2002 Miami Hurricanes football team roster
Players
Coaches
**Offense**

Pos.	#	Name	Class
RB	2	Willis McGahee	So
WR	5	Andre Johnson	Jr
WR	9	Kevin Beard	Jr
QB	11	Ken Dorsey	Sr
WR	17	Tim Zwart	Fr
RB	32	Frank Gore	So
RB	34	Jarrett Payton	Jr
OT	60	Vernon Carey	Jr
C	66	Brett Romberg	Sr
G	74	Sherko Haji-Rasouli	Sr
OT	76	Carlos Joseph	Jr
OL	77	Chris Myers	So
WR	84	Roscoe Parrish	Fr
TE	81	Kellen Winslow II	So
TE	74	Eric Winston	So

**Defense**

Pos.	#	Name	Class
LB	17	D.J. Williams	Jr
CB	25	Alfonso Marshall	Jr
CB	22	Kelly Jennings	Fr
CB	6	Antrel Rolle	So
S	26	Sean Taylor	So
LB	49	Darrell McClover	Jr
LB	51	Jonathan Vilma	Jr
DE	55	Jamaal Green	Sr
DT	56	Santonio Thomas	Jr
DT	75	Vince Wilfork	So
DE	91	Matt Walters	Sr
DT	94	William Joseph	Sr
DE	95	Jerome McDougle	Sr
DE	99	Andrew Williams	Sr

**Special teams**

Pos.	#	Name	Class
K	16	Todd Sievers	Sr

Head coach

- Larry Coker

Coordinators/assistant coaches

- Rob Chudzinski (OC)
- Randy Shannon (DC)
- D. J. Eliot (GA)

Legend

- **(C)** Team captain
- **(S)** Suspended
- **(I)** Ineligible
- Injured
- Redshirt

Roster

=== Depth chart ===
Bold indicates starters at that position. Bold italics indicates a returning starter.

==== Offense ====
- QB- **Ken Dorsey**, Derrick Crudup, Eric Moore
- FB- **Kyle Cobia**, Quadtrine Hill
- RB- **Willis McGahee**, Jarrett Payton, Frank Gore
- WR- **Andre Johnson**, Roscoe Parrish Jason Geathers
- WR- **Kevin Beard**, Ethenic Sands, Tim Zwart
- TE- **Kellen Winslow II**, David Williams
- LT- **Carlos Joseph**, Tony Tella
- LG- **Sherko Haji-Rasouli**, Joe McGrath
- C- **Brett Romberg**. Joel Rodriguez
- RG- **Ed Wilkins**, Chris Myers
- RT- **Vernon Carey** , Rashad Butler

==== Defense ====
- DE- **Andrew Williams**, Jamaal Green
- DT- **Matt Walters**, Santonio Thomas
- DT- **William Joseph**, Vince Wilfork
- DE- **Jerome McDougle**, Cornelius Green
- WLB- **D. J. Williams**, Jerrel Weaver
- MLB- **Jonathan Vilma**, Leon Williams
- SLB- **Howard Clark**, Rocky McIntosh
- CB- **Antrel Rolle**, Jean Leone
- CB- **Kelly Jennings**, Alfonso Marshall
- SS- **Maurice Sikes**, Marcus Maxey
- FS- **Sean Taylor**, James Scott

==== Special teams ====
- K- **Todd Sievers**, Mark Gent
- P- **Freddie Capshaw**, Dan Lundy
- KR- Roscoe Parrish

== Statistics ==
- QB Ken Dorsey: 222/393 (56.5%) for 3,369 yards (8.57) with 28 TD vs. 12 INT (3.05%).
- RB Willis McGahee: 282 carries for 1,753 yards (6.22) and 28 TD. 27 catches for 355 yards and 0 TD.
- WR Andre Johnson: 52 catches for 1,092 yards (21.00) and 9 TD.
- TE Kellen Winslow Jr.: 57 catches for 726 yards (12.74) and 8 TD.
- K Todd Sievers: 12/20 (60.0%) on FG with 63 XPM. Long FG of 53 yards.

== Awards ==
- Brett Romberg: Rimington Trophy
