= 2002 Florida State Seminoles football team =

American college football season

2002 Florida State Seminoles football

ACC champion

Sugar Bowl, L 13–26 vs. Georgia
- Conference: Atlantic Coast Conference

Ranking
- Coaches: No. 23
- AP: No. 21
- Record: 9–5 (7–1 ACC)
- Head coach: Bobby Bowden (27th season)
- Offensive coordinator: Jeff Bowden (2nd season)
- Offensive scheme: Pro-style
- Defensive coordinator: Mickey Andrews (19th season)
- Base defense: 4–3
- Captains: Brett Williams; Alonzo Jackson; Patrick Newton
- Home stadium: Doak Campbell Stadium

2002 Atlantic Coast Conference football standings
| | Conf. | | | Overall |
| Team | W | | L | W | | L |
|---|---|---|---|---|---|---|
| No. 21 Florida State $ | 7 | – | 1 | 9 | – | 5 |
| No. 22 Virginia | 6 | – | 2 | 9 | – | 5 |
| No. 13 Maryland | 6 | – | 2 | 11 | – | 3 |
| No. 12 NC State | 5 | – | 3 | 11 | – | 3 |
| Clemson | 4 | – | 4 | 7 | – | 6 |
| Georgia Tech | 4 | – | 4 | 7 | – | 6 |
| Wake Forest | 3 | – | 5 | 7 | – | 6 |
| North Carolina | 1 | – | 7 | 3 | – | 9 |
| Duke | 0 | – | 8 | 2 | – | 10 |
$ – BCS representative as conference champion; Rankings from AP Poll

The 2002 Florida State Seminoles football team represented the Florida State University as a member of the Atlantic Coast Conference (ACC) during the 2002 NCAA Division I-A football season. Led by 27th-year head coach Bobby Bowden, the Seminoles compiled an overall record of 9–5 with a mark of 7–1 in conference play, winning the ACC title. Florida State was invited to the Sugar Bowl, where the Seminoles lost to Georgia. The team played home games at Doak Campbell Stadium in Tallahassee, Florida.

During the season, Bowden passed Bear Bryant on the list of college football career coaching wins leaders.

== Schedule ==
| Date | Time | Opponent | Rank | Site | TV | Result | Attendance |
|---|---|---|---|---|---|---|---|
| August 24 | 8:30 p.m. | at Iowa State* | No. 3 | Arrowhead Stadium; Kansas City, MO (Eddie Robinson Classic) | FSN | W 38–31 | 55,132 |
| August 31 | 3:30 p.m. | Virginia | No. 5 | Doak Campbell Stadium; Tallahassee, FL (Jefferson–Eppes Trophy) | ABC | W 40–19 | 79,406 |
| September 14 | 7:45 p.m. | at Maryland | No. 5 | Byrd Stadium; College Park, MD | ESPN | W 37–10 | 51,758 |
| September 21 | 7:00 p.m. | Duke | No. 5 | Doak Campbell Stadium; Tallahassee, FL | SUN | W 48–17 | 82,397 |
| September 26 | 7:45 p.m. | at Louisville* | No. 4 | Papa John's Cardinal Stadium; Louisville, KY | ESPN | L 20–26 ^{OT} | 38,109 |
| October 3 | 7:45 p.m. | Clemson | No. 11 | Doak Campbell Stadium; Tallahassee, FL (rivalry) | ESPN | W 48–31 | 78,841 |
| October 12 | 12:00 p.m. | at No. 1 Miami (FL)* | No. 9 | Miami Orange Bowl; Miami, FL (rivalry) | ABC | L 27–28 | 81,927 |
| October 26 | 12:00 p.m. | No. 6 Notre Dame* | No. 11 | Doak Campbell Stadium; Tallahassee, FL (College GameDay) (rivalry) | ABC | L 24–34 | 84,106 |
| November 2 | 4:00 p.m. | at Wake Forest | No. 18 | Groves Stadium; Winston-Salem, NC | ESPN2 | W 34–21 | 24,710 |
| November 9 | 3:30 p.m. | at Georgia Tech | No. 17 | Bobby Dodd Stadium; Atlanta, GA | ABC | W 21–13 | 43,719 |
| November 16 | 3:30 p.m. | North Carolina^{†} | No. 15 | Doak Campbell Stadium; Tallahassee, FL | ABC | W 40–14 | 81,910 |
| November 23 | 3:30 p.m. | at NC State | No. 14 | Carter–Finley Stadium; Raleigh, NC | ABC | L 7–17 | 51,500 |
| November 30 | 8:00 p.m. | No. 15 Florida* | No. 23 | Doak Campbell Stadium; Tallahassee, FL (rivalry) | ABC | W 31–14 | 83,938 |
| January 1 | 8:30 p.m. | vs. No. 4 Georgia* | No. 16 | Louisiana Superdome; New Orleans, LA (Sugar Bowl) | ABC | L 13–26 | 74,269 |
*Non-conference game; ^{†}Homecoming; Rankings from AP Poll released prior to the game; All times are in Eastern time

== Games summaries ==
=== Vs. Iowa State ===
No. 3 Florida State vs. Iowa State

| Team | 1 | 2 | 3 | 4 | Total |
|---|---|---|---|---|---|
| • No. 3 Seminoles | 17 | 14 | 0 | 7 | 38 |
| Cyclones | 0 | 14 | 3 | 14 | 31 |

- Date: August 24
- Location: Arrowhead Stadium, Kansas City, Missouri
- Game start: 7:30 PM CDT
- Game attendance: 55,132
- TV announcers (FSN): Joel Meyers (Play-by-play), Kellen Winslow, Artie Gigantino (Colors), & Eric Clemons (Sideline)

Scoring summary
| 1 | 9:11 | FSU | Nick Maddox 5-yard run (Xavier Beitia kick) | FSU 7-0 |
| 1 | 6:29 | FSU | Alonzo Jackson 48-yard interception return (Beitia, kick) | FSU 14-0 |
| 1 | 1:21 | FSU | Beitia 35-yard field goal | FSU 17-0 |
| 2 | 14:54 | FSU | Anquan Boldin 2-yard pass from Chris Rix (Beitia kick) | FSU 24-0 |
| 2 | 14:03 | ISU | Hiawatha Rutland 36-yard run (Adam Benike kick) | FSU 24-7 |
| 2 | 1:05 | FSU | Greg Jones 9-yard run (Beitia kick) | FSU 31-7 |
| 2 | 0:09 | ISU | Kyle Knock 29-yard pass from Seneca Wallace (Benike kick) | FSU 31-14 |
| 3 | 1:23 | ISU | Benike 33-yard field goal | FSU 31-17 |
| 4 | 13:01 | ISU | Wallace 1-yard run (Adam Benike kick) | FSU 31-24 |
| 4 | 8:15 | FSU | Boldin 31-yard pass from Rix (Beitia kick) | FSU 38-24 |
| 4 | 5:26 | ISU | Jamaul Montgomery 39-yard pass from Wallace (Benike kick) | FSU 38-31 |

== Roster ==
2002 Florida State Seminoles football team roster
Players
Coaches
Offense

| Pos. | # | Name | Class |
|---|---|---|---|
| OT | 70 | Alex Barron | So |
| WR | 4 | Anquan Boldin | Sr |
| OL | 54 | Milford Brown | Sr |
| TE | 38 | Paul Irons | So |
| RB | 6 | Greg Jones | Jr |
| QB | 5 | Adrian McPherson | So |
| WR | 81 | P. K. Sam | Jr |
| OT | 72 | Brett Williams | Sr |
| OT | 79 | Todd Williams | Sr |
| OT | 77 | Ray Willis | So |

Defense

| Pos. | # | Name | Class |
|---|---|---|---|
| LB | 58 | Michael Boulware | Jr |
| DE | 59 | Charles Howard | Jr |
| LB | 32 | James Lewis | Jr |
| DE | 48 | Alonzo Jackson | Sr |
| LB | 9 | Kendyll Pope | Jr |
| FS | 22 | Pat Watkins | Fr |
| DE | 95 | Kamerion Wimbley | Fr |
| NG | 91 | Jeff Womble | Jr |

Special teams

| Pos. | # | Name | Class |

Head coach

- Bobby Bowden

Coordinators/assistant coaches

Legend

- (C) Team captain
- (S) Suspended
- (I) Ineligible
- Injured
- Redshirt

Roster
Last update: 2002-10-28
