= 2002 NCAA Division I-A football rankings =

- Season: 2002
- Bowl season: 2002–03 bowl games
- Preseason No. 1: Miami (FL)
- End of season champions: Ohio State
- Conference with most teams in final AP poll: Big 10, Big 12, Big East, ACC (4)

Two human polls and one formulaic ranking make up the 2002 NCAA Division I-A football rankings. Unlike most sports, college football's governing body, the National Collegiate Athletic Association (NCAA), does not bestow a National Championship title for Division I-A football. That title is primarily bestowed by different polling agencies. There are several polls that currently exist. The main weekly polls are the AP Poll and Coaches Poll. About halfway through the season the Bowl Championship Series (BCS) standings are released.

== Legend ==
	Increase in ranking
	Decrease in ranking
	Not ranked previous week
	Selected for BCS National Championship Game
(#–#)	Win–loss record
(Italics)	Number of first place votes
т	Tied with team above or below also with this symbol

== AP Poll ==
	Preseason Preseason	Week 1 Aug 26	Week 2 Sep 2	Week 3 Sep 8	Week 4 Sep 15	Week 5 Sep 22	Week 6 Sep 29	Week 7 Oct 6	Week 8 Oct 13	Week 9 Oct 20	Week 10 Oct 27	Week 11 Nov 3	Week 12 Nov 10	Week 13 Nov 17	Week 14 Nov 24	Week 15 Dec 1	Week 16 Dec 8	Week 17 (Final) Jan 4	
1.	Miami (FL) (27)	Miami (FL) (0–0) (27) т	Miami (FL) (1–0) (34)	Miami (FL) (2–0) (68)	Miami (FL) (3–0) (68)	Miami (FL) (4–0) (69)	Miami (FL) (4–0) (71)	Miami (FL) (5–0) (73)	Miami (FL) (6–0) (65)	Miami (FL) (6–0) (61)	Miami (FL) (7–0) (59)	Oklahoma (8–0) (42)	Miami (FL) (9–0) (74)	Miami (FL) (9–0) (74)	Miami (FL) (10–0) (71)	Miami (FL) (11–0) (73)	Miami (FL) (12–0) (74)	Ohio State (14–0) (71)	1.
2.	Oklahoma (21)	Oklahoma (0–0) (27) т	Oklahoma (1–0) (21)	Oklahoma (2–0) (3)	Oklahoma (3–0) (3)	Oklahoma (3–0) (3)	Texas (4–0) (2)	Oklahoma (5–0)	Oklahoma (6–0) (9)	Oklahoma (7–0) (13)	Oklahoma (7–0) (14)	Miami (FL) (8–0) (32)	Ohio State (11–0)	Ohio State (12–0)	Ohio State (13–0)	Ohio State (13–0)	Ohio State (13–0)	Miami (FL) (12–1)	2.
3.	Florida State (10)	Texas (0–0) (13)	Texas (1–0) (10)	Texas (1–0) (3)	Texas (2–0) (3)	Texas (3–0) (2)	Oklahoma (4–0) (1)	Texas (5–0) (1)	Virginia Tech (6–0)	Virginia Tech (7–0)	Virginia Tech (8–0)	Ohio State (10–0)	Washington State (9–1)	Washington State (9–1)	Oklahoma (10–1)	Iowa (11–1)	Iowa (11–1)	Georgia (13–1)	3.
4.	Texas (13)	Tennessee (0–0) (3)	Tennessee (1–0) (5)	Tennessee (2–0)	Tennessee (2–0)	Florida State (4–0)	Virginia Tech (5–0)	Virginia Tech (5–0)	Ohio State (7–0)	Ohio State (8–0)	Notre Dame (8–0) (1)	Texas (8–1)	Oklahoma (8–1) т	Oklahoma (9–1)	Iowa (11–1)	Georgia (11–1)	Georgia (12–1)	USC (11–2)	4.
5.	Tennessee (3)	Florida State (1–0) (4)	Florida State (2–0) (4)	Florida State (2–0)	Florida State (3–0)	Virginia Tech (4–0)	Ohio State (5–0)	Ohio State (6–0)	Georgia (6–0)	Georgia (7–0)	Georgia (8–0)	Washington State (8–1)	Texas (9–1) т	Iowa (11–1)	Georgia (10–1)	USC (10–2)	USC (10–2)	Oklahoma (12–2)	5.
6.	Florida	Florida (0–0)	Florida (1–0)	Ohio State (2–0)	Ohio State (3–0)	Ohio State (4–0)	Florida (4–1)	Georgia (5–0)	Oregon (6–0)	Notre Dame (7–0)	Ohio State (9–0)	Iowa (9–1)	Iowa (10–1)	Georgia (10–1)	USC (9–2)	Kansas State (10–2)	Kansas State (10–2)	Texas (11–2)	6.
7.	Colorado	Colorado (0–0)	Michigan (1–0)	Michigan (2–0)	Virginia Tech (3–0)	Florida (3–1)	Georgia (4–0)	Oregon (5–0)	Notre Dame (6–0)	Texas (6–1)	Texas (7–1)	Georgia (8–1)	Georgia (9–1)	USC (8–2)	Notre Dame (10–1)	Washington State (9–2)	Washington State (10–2)	Kansas State (11–2)	7.
8.	Georgia	Georgia (0–0)	Ohio State (1–0)	Nebraska (3–0)	Georgia (2–0)	Georgia (3–0)	Oregon (4–0)	Notre Dame (5–0)	Texas (5–1)	Michigan (6–1)	Washington State (7–1)	Virginia Tech (8–1)	USC (7–2)	Notre Dame (9–1)	Kansas State (10–2)	Oklahoma (10–2)	Oklahoma (11–2)	Iowa (11–2)	8.
9.	Washington	Nebraska (1–0)	Nebraska (2–0)	Georgia (1–0)	Oregon (3–0)	Oregon (4–0)	Notre Dame (4–0)	Florida State (5–1)	Iowa State (6–1)	Washington State (6–1)	Iowa (8–1)	Notre Dame (8–1)	Notre Dame (9–1)	Alabama (9–2)	Washington State (9–2)	Texas (10–2)	Texas (10–2)	Michigan (10–3)	9.
10.	Nebraska	Ohio State (1–0)	Georgia (1–0)	Washington State (2–0)	Florida (2–1)	Notre Dame (4–0)	Tennessee (3–1)	Tennessee (4–1)	Washington State (6–1)	LSU (6–1)	NC State (9–0)	USC (6–2)	Alabama (8–2)	Kansas State (9–2)	Texas (9–2)	Penn State (9–3)	Penn State (9–3)	Washington State (10–3)	10.
11.	Washington State	Washington (0–0)	Washington State (1–0)	Virginia Tech (2–0)	USC (2–0)	Tennessee (2–1)	Florida State (4–1)	Iowa State (5–1)	Michigan (5–1)	Florida State (5–2)	USC (6–2)	Alabama (7–2)	Kansas State (8–2)	Texas (9–2)	Penn State (9–3)	Notre Dame (10–2)	Notre Dame (10–2)	Alabama (10–3)	11.
12.	Michigan	Washington State (0–0)	Virginia Tech (2–0)	Florida (1–1)	Notre Dame (3–0)	Penn State (3–0)	Washington (3–1)	Washington State (5–1)	Florida State (5–2)	NC State (8–0)	Alabama (6–2)	Kansas State (7–2)	Michigan (8–2)	Michigan (9–2)	Michigan (9–3)	Colorado (9–3)	Michigan (9–3)	NC State (11–3)	12.
13.	Ohio State	Michigan (0–0)	Oregon (1–0)	Oregon (2–0)	Washington (1–1)	Washington (2–1)	Kansas State (4–0)	Michigan (4–1)	NC State (7–0)	Iowa (7–1)	Colorado (6–2)	Michigan (7–2)	Virginia Tech (8–2)	Virginia Tech (8–2)	Colorado (8–3)	Michigan (9–3)	Alabama (10–3)	Maryland (11–3)	13.
14.	LSU	LSU (0–0)	Washington (0–1)	Washington (1–1)	Michigan (2–1)	Michigan (3–1)	Michigan (4–1)	NC State (6–0)	LSU (5–1)	Oregon (6–1)	Kansas State (6–2)	NC State (9–1)	LSU (7–2)	Florida State (8–3)	Alabama (9–3)	Alabama (10–3)	Colorado (9–4)	Auburn (9–4)	14.
15.	Oregon	Oregon (0–0)	Michigan State (1–0)	Michigan State (2–0)	Penn State (2–0)	Kansas State (4–0)	Iowa State (5–1)	Penn State (4–1)	Iowa (6–1)	USC (5–2)	Michigan (6–2)	Oregon (7–2)	Florida State (7–3)	Penn State (8–3)	Florida (8–3)	West Virginia (9–3)	West Virginia (9–3)	Boise State (12–1)	15.
16.	Virginia Tech	Virginia Tech (1–0)	Marshall (1–0)	Marshall (1–0)	Washington State (2–1)	Washington State (3–1)	NC State (6–0)	Florida (4–2)	Tennessee (4–2)	Tennessee (4–2)	Arizona State (7–2)	LSU (6–2)	Penn State (7–3)	Colorado (8–3)	Colorado State (10–2)	Florida State (9–4)	Florida State (9–4)	Penn State (9–4)	16.
17.	Louisville	Louisville (0–0)	Colorado (0–1)	USC (1–0)	NC State (4–0)	NC State (5–0)	Washington State (4–1)	Iowa (5–1)	Kansas State (5–1)	Iowa State (6–2)	LSU (6–2)	Florida State (6–3)	Colorado (7–3)	Pittsburgh (8–2)	Pittsburgh (8–3)	NC State (10–3)	NC State (10–3)	Notre Dame (10–3)	17.
18.	Michigan State	Michigan State (0–0)	USC (0–0)	Colorado (1–1)	Nebraska (3–1)	USC (2–1)	USC (3–1)	LSU (4–1)	Air Force (6–0)	Penn State (5–2)	Florida State (5–3)	Colorado (6–3)	Pittsburgh (8–2)	Maryland (9–2)	LSU (8–3)	Virginia Tech (9–3)	Boise State (11–1)	Virginia Tech (10–4)	18.
19.	Marshall	Marshall (0–0)	Colorado State (2–0)	NC State (3–0)	Texas A&M (2–0)	Iowa State (4–1)	Wisconsin (5–0)	Kansas State (4–1)	USC (4–2)	Alabama (5–2)	Oregon (6–2)	Penn State (6–3)	Maryland (8–2)	Florida (8–3)	Boise State (11–1)	Boise State (11–1)	Auburn (8–4)	Pittsburgh (9–4)	19.
20.	USC	USC (0–0)	Texas A&M (1–0)	Notre Dame (2–0)	UCLA (2–0)	Nebraska (3–1)	Penn State (3–1)	USC (3–2)	Penn State (4–2)	Kansas State (5–2)	Penn State (5–3)	Bowling Green (8–0)	Florida (7–3)	Colorado State (9–2)	Auburn (8–4)	Auburn (8–4)	Maryland (10–3)	Colorado (9–5)	20.
21.	Maryland	Maryland (0–0)	NC State (2–0)	Texas A&M (2–0)	Iowa State (3–1)	Wisconsin (5–0)	LSU (3–1)	Air Force (5–0)	Ole Miss (5–1)	Colorado (5–2)	Bowling Green (7–0)	Iowa State (7–3)	Colorado State (8–2)	LSU (7–3)	NC State (10–3)	Maryland (10–3)	Virginia Tech (9–4)	Florida State (9–5)	21.
22.	South Carolina	South Carolina (0–0)	South Carolina (1–0)	Wisconsin (3–0)	Wisconsin (4–0)	LSU (2–1)	Alabama (4–1)	Washington (3–2)	Washington (4–2)	Air Force (6–1)	Iowa State (6–3)	Pittsburgh (7–2)	NC State (9–2)	TCU (8–1)	Virginia Tech (8–3)	Arkansas (9–3)	Florida (8–4)	Virginia (9–5)	22.
23.	Texas A&M	Texas A&M (0–0)	Notre Dame (1–0)	UCLA (1–0)	California (3–0)	Oregon State (4–0)	Texas A&M (3–1)	Wisconsin (5–1)	Colorado (4–2)	Arizona State (6–2)	Minnesota (7–1)	Florida (6–3)	Oregon (7–3)	Boise State (10–1)	Florida State (8–4)	Florida (8–4)	Colorado State (10–3)	TCU (10–2)	23.
24.	Penn State	Penn State (0–0)	LSU (0–1)	Colorado State (2–1)	LSU (2–1)	Texas A&M (2–1)	Iowa (4–1)	Auburn (4–1)	Alabama (4–2)	Bowling Green (6–0)	Colorado State (7–2)	Colorado State (8–2)	Auburn (7–3)	Texas Tech (8–4)	West Virginia (8–4)	Colorado State (10–3)	Pittsburgh (8–4)	Marshall (11–2)	24.
25.	Wisconsin	NC State (1–0)	Wisconsin (2–0)	LSU (1–1)	Kansas State (3–0)	Colorado State (3–1)	Colorado State (4–1)	Ole Miss (4–1)	Bowling Green (5–0)	Minnesota (7–1)	Tennessee (4–3)	Arizona State (7–3)	TCU (8–1)	UCLA (7–3)	Maryland (9–3)	Pittsburgh (8–4)	Arkansas (9–4)	West Virginia (9–4)	25.
	Preseason Preseason	Week 1 Aug 26	Week 2 Sep 2	Week 3 Sep 8	Week 4 Sep 15	Week 5 Sep 22	Week 6 Sep 29	Week 7 Oct 6	Week 8 Oct 13	Week 9 Oct 20	Week 10 Oct 27	Week 11 Nov 3	Week 12 Nov 10	Week 13 Nov 17	Week 14 Nov 24	Week 15 Dec 1	Week 16 Dec 8	Week 17 (Final) Jan 4	
		Dropped: Wisconsin	Dropped: Louisville; Maryland; Penn State	Dropped: South Carolina	Dropped: Michigan State; Marshall; Colorado; Colorado State	Dropped: UCLA; California	Dropped: Nebraska; Oregon State	Dropped: Alabama; Texas A&M; Colorado State	Dropped: Wisconsin; Auburn	Dropped: Ole Miss; Washington	Dropped: Air Force	Dropped: Tennessee	Dropped: Bowling Green; Iowa State; Arizona State	Dropped: NC State; Oregon; Auburn	Dropped: Texas Tech; UCLA	Dropped: LSU	None	Dropped: Arkansas; Florida; Colorado State	

== Coaches Poll ==
	Preseason Preseason	Week 1 Aug 26	Week 2 Sep 2	Week 3 Sep 8	Week 4 Sep 15	Week 5 Sep 23	Week 6 Sep 30	Week 7 Oct 6	Week 8 Oct 13	Week 9 Oct 20	Week 10 Oct 27	Week 11 Nov 3	Week 12 Nov 10	Week 13 Nov 17	Week 14 Nov 24	Week 15 Dec 1	Week 16 Dec 8	Week 17 (Final) Jan 5	
1.	Miami (FL) (34)	Miami (FL) (0–0) (42)	Miami (FL) (1–0) (49)	Miami (FL) (2–0) (58)	Miami (FL) (3–0) (58)	Miami (FL) (4–0) (59)	Miami (FL) (4–0) (59)	Miami (FL) (5–0) (60)	Miami (FL) (6–0) (58)	Miami (FL) (6–0) (55)	Miami (FL) (7–0) (53)	Miami (FL) (8–0) (47)	Miami (FL) (9–0) (61)	Miami (FL) (9–0) (61)	Miami (FL) (10–0) (60)	Miami (FL) (11–0) (60)	Miami (FL) (12–0) (61)	Ohio State (14–0) (61)	1.
2.	Texas (9)	Texas (0–0) (10)	Texas (1–0) (5)	Texas (1–0) (2)	Texas (2–0) (2)	Texas (3–0) (2)	Texas (4–0) (2)	Texas (5–0) (1)	Oklahoma (6–0) (3)	Oklahoma (7–0) (6)	Oklahoma (7–0) (7)	Oklahoma (8–0) (14)	Ohio State (11–0)	Ohio State (12–0)	Ohio State (13–0) (1)	Ohio State (13–0) (1)	Ohio State (13–0)	Miami (FL) (12–1)	2.
3.	Oklahoma (11)	Oklahoma (0–0) (7)	Oklahoma (1–0) (4)	Oklahoma (2–0)	Oklahoma (3–0) (1)	Oklahoma (3–0)	Oklahoma (4–0)	Oklahoma (5–0)	Virginia Tech (6–0)	Virginia Tech (7–0)	Virginia Tech (8–0)	Ohio State (10–0)	Texas (9–1)	Washington State (9–1)	Iowa (11–1)	Iowa (11–1)	Iowa (11–1)	Georgia (13–1)	3.
4.	Florida State (7)	Tennessee (0–0)	Tennessee (1–0)	Tennessee (2–0)	Tennessee (2–0)	Florida State (4–0)	Virginia Tech (5–0)	Virginia Tech (5–0)	Ohio State (7–0)	Ohio State (8–0)	Ohio State (9–0)	Texas (8–1)	Washington State (9–1)	Iowa (11–1)	Oklahoma (10–1)	Georgia (11–1)	Georgia (12–1)	USC (11–2)	4.
5.	Tennessee	Florida State (1–0) (2)	Florida State (2–0) (2)	Florida State (2–0) (1)	Florida State (3–0)	Virginia Tech (4–0)	Ohio State (5–0)	Ohio State (6–0)	Georgia (6–0)	Georgia (7–0)	Georgia (8–0)	Washington State (8–1)	Iowa (10–1)	Oklahoma (9–1)	Georgia (10–1)	USC (10–2)	USC (10–2)	Oklahoma (12–2)	5.
6.	Colorado	Colorado (0–0)	Florida (1–0)	Michigan (2–0)	Ohio State (3–0)	Ohio State (4–0)	Georgia (4–0)	Georgia (5–0)	Oregon (6–0)	Notre Dame (7–0)	Notre Dame (8–0) (1)	Iowa (9–1)	Oklahoma (8–1)	Georgia (10–1)	USC (9–2)	Kansas State (10–2)	Kansas State (10–2)	Kansas State (11–2)	6.
7.	Florida	Florida (0–0)	Michigan (1–0)	Nebraska (3–0)	Virginia Tech (3–0)	Georgia (3–0)	Oregon (4–0)	Oregon (5–0)	Notre Dame (6–0)	Texas (6–1)	Texas (7–1)	Virginia Tech (8–1)	Georgia (9–1)	USC (8–2)	Notre Dame (10–1)	Washington State (9–2)	Washington State (10–2)	Texas (11–2)	7.
8.	Nebraska	Nebraska (1–0)	Nebraska (2–0)	Ohio State (2–0)	Georgia (2–0)	Oregon (4–0)	Florida (4–1)	Notre Dame (5–0)	Texas (5–1)	Michigan (6–1)	NC State (9–0)	Georgia (8–1)	USC (7–2)	Notre Dame (9–1)	Kansas State (10–2)	Texas (10–2)	Oklahoma (11–2)	Iowa (11–2)	8.
9.	Washington	Washington (0–0)	Ohio State (1–0)	Virginia Tech (2–0)	Oregon (3–0)	Florida (3–1)	Notre Dame (4–0)	Tennessee (4–1)	Michigan (5–1)	NC State (8–0)	Washington State (7–1)	USC (6–2)	Notre Dame (9–1)	Michigan (9–2)	Washington State (9–2)	Oklahoma (10–2)	Texas (10–2)	Michigan (10–3)	9.
10.	Michigan	Michigan (0–0)	Virginia Tech (2–0)	Georgia (1–0)	Florida (2–1)	Notre Dame (4–0)	Tennessee (3–1)	Michigan (4–1)	NC State (7–0)	LSU (6–1)	Iowa (8–1)	Notre Dame (8–1)	Michigan (8–2)	Kansas State (9–2)	Texas (9–2)	Penn State (9–3)	Penn State (9–3)	Washington State (10–3)	10.
11.	Georgia	Ohio State (1–0)	Georgia (1–0)	Washington State (2–0)	USC (2–0)	Tennessee (2–1)	Florida State (4–1)	NC State (6–0)	Washington State (6–1)	Washington State (6–1)	USC (6–2)	Michigan (7–2)	Kansas State (8–2)	Texas (9–2)	Florida (8–3)	Michigan (9–3)	Michigan (9–3)	NC State (11–3)	11.
12.	Ohio State	Georgia (0–0)	Washington State (1–0)	Oregon (2–0)	Notre Dame (3–0)	Penn State (3–0)	Washington (3–1)	Florida State (5–1)	LSU (5–1)	Oregon (6–1)	Colorado (6–2)	Kansas State (7–2)	LSU (7–2)	Virginia Tech (8–2)	Penn State (9–3)	Colorado (9–3)	Notre Dame (10–2)	Boise State (12–1)	12.
13.	LSU	Washington State (0–0)	Oregon (1–0)	Florida (1–1)	Washington (1–1)	Washington (2–1)	Michigan (4–1)	Washington State (5–1)	Iowa State (6–1)	Florida State (5–2)	Michigan (6–2)	NC State (9–1)	Virginia Tech (8–2)	Florida (8–3)	Colorado State (10–2)	Notre Dame (10–2)	West Virginia (9–3)	Maryland (11–3)	13.
14.	Washington State	LSU (0–0)	Washington (0–1)	Washington (1–1)	Michigan (2–1)	Michigan (3–1)	NC State (6–0)	Iowa State (5–1)	Florida State (5–2)	Iowa (7–1)	Kansas State (6–2)	LSU (6–2)	Florida (7–3)	Florida State (8–3)	Michigan (9–3)	Virginia Tech (9–3)	Colorado (9–4)	Virginia Tech (10–4)	14.
15.	Oregon	Oregon (0–0)	Michigan State (1–0)	Michigan State (2–0)	Penn State (2–0)	NC State (5–0)	Wisconsin (5–0)	LSU (4–1)	Air Force (6–0)	Tennessee (4–2)	LSU (6–2)	Oregon (7–2)	Florida State (7–3)	Colorado State (9–2)	Colorado (8–3)	Boise State (11–1)	Boise State (11–1)	Penn State (9–4)	15.
16.	Virginia Tech	Virginia Tech (1–0)	USC (0–0)	USC (1–0)	NC State (4–0)	Wisconsin (5–0)	Kansas State (4–0)	Florida (4–2)	Iowa (6–1)	USC (5–2)	Oregon (6–2)	Bowling Green (8–0)	Penn State (7–3)	Penn State (8–3)	Boise State (11–1)	West Virginia (9–3)	Florida State (9–4)	Auburn (9–4)	16.
17.	Louisville	Michigan State (0–0)	Colorado (0–1)	Marshall (1–0)	Wisconsin (4–0)	Kansas State (4–0)	Washington State (4–1)	Penn State (4–1)	Washington (4–2)	Penn State (5–2)	Arizona State (7–2)	Florida (6–3)	Colorado State (8–2)	Colorado (8–3)	LSU (8–3)	NC State (10–3)	NC State (10–3)	Notre Dame (10–3)	17.
18.	Michigan State	Louisville (0–0)	Marshall (1–0)	Wisconsin (3–0)	Washington State (2–1)	Washington State (3–1)	Iowa State (5–1)	Washington (3–2)	Tennessee (4–2)	Iowa State (6–2)	Bowling Green (7–0)	Florida State (6–3)	Colorado (7–3)	Maryland (9–2)	Pittsburgh (8–3)	Florida State (9–4)	Maryland (10–3)	Pittsburgh (9–4)	18.
19.	USC	USC (0–0)	South Carolina (1–0)	Colorado (1–1)	Nebraska (3–1)	Nebraska (3–1)	LSU (3–1)	Air Force (5–0)	Kansas State (5–1)	Air Force (6–1)	Minnesota (7–1)	Penn State (6–3)	Maryland (8–2)	Pittsburgh (8–2)	Virginia Tech (8–3)	Maryland (10–3)	Virginia Tech (9–4)	Marshall (11–2)	19.
20.	Maryland	Maryland (0–0)	Colorado State (2–0)	NC State (3–0)	LSU (2–1)	LSU (2–1)	USC (3–1)	Iowa (5–1)	USC (4–2)	Colorado (5–2)	Florida State (5–3)	Colorado State (8–2)	NC State (9–2)	LSU (7–3)	NC State (10–3)	Florida (8–4)	Florida (8–4)	West Virginia (9–4)	20.
21.	Marshall	South Carolina (0–0)	Wisconsin (2–0)	Notre Dame (2–0)	Texas A&M (2–0)	Iowa State (4–1)	Penn State (3–1)	Auburn (4–1)	Penn State (4–2)	Kansas State (5–2)	Penn State (5–3)	Colorado (6–3)	Pittsburgh (8–2)	Boise State (10–1)	West Virginia (8–3)	Colorado State (10–3)	Colorado State (10–3)	Colorado (9–5)	21.
22.	South Carolina	Marshall (0–0)	NC State (2–0)	LSU (1–1)	UCLA (2–0)	USC (2–1)	Colorado State (4–1)	Wisconsin (5–1)	Ole Miss (5–1)	Bowling Green (6–0)	Florida (5–3)	Iowa State (7–3)	Oregon (7–3)	TCU (8–1)	Florida State (8–4)	Arkansas (9–3)	Auburn (8–4)	TCU (10–2)	22.
23.	Wisconsin	Penn State (0–0)	LSU (0–1)	Texas A&M (2–0)	Kansas State (3–0)	Colorado State (3–1)	Texas A&M (3–1)	Kansas State (4–1)	Bowling Green (5–0)	Florida (5–3)	Iowa State (6–3)	Pittsburgh (7–2)	Boise State (9–1)	Texas Tech (8–4)	Maryland (9–3)	Auburn (8–4)	Pittsburgh (8–4)	Florida State (9–5)	23.
24.	Penn State	NC State (1–0)	Notre Dame (1–0)	BYU (2–0)	Iowa State (3–1)	Oregon State (4–0)	Auburn (4–1)	USC (3–2)	Florida (4–3)	Minnesota (7–1)	Colorado State (7–2)	Arizona State (7–3)	TCU (8–1)	UCLA (7–3)	Hawaii (9–2)	Pittsburgh (8–4)	Marshall (10–2)	Florida (9–5)	24.
25.	NC State	Wisconsin (1–0)	Penn State (1–0)	Penn State (1–0)	Colorado State (3–1)	Auburn (3–1)	Air Force (4–0)	UCLA (4–1)	Colorado (4–2)	Arizona State (6–2)	Marshall (6–1)	Maryland (7–2)	Bowling Green (8–1)	Hawaii (8–2)	Auburn (8–4)	LSU (8–4)	LSU (8–4)	Virginia (9–5)	25.
	Preseason Preseason	Week 1 Aug 26	Week 2 Sep 2	Week 3 Sep 8	Week 4 Sep 15	Week 5 Sep 23	Week 6 Sep 30	Week 7 Oct 6	Week 8 Oct 13	Week 9 Oct 20	Week 10 Oct 27	Week 11 Nov 3	Week 12 Nov 10	Week 13 Nov 17	Week 14 Nov 24	Week 15 Dec 1	Week 16 Dec 8	Week 17 (Final) Jan 5	
		None	Dropped: Louisville; Maryland	Dropped: South Carolina; Colorado State	Dropped: Michigan State; Marshall; Colorado; BYU	Dropped: Texas A&M; UCLA	Dropped: Oregon State; Nebraska	Dropped: Colorado State; Texas A&M	Dropped: Auburn; Wisconsin; UCLA	Dropped: Washington; Ole Miss	Dropped: Tennessee; Air Force	Dropped: Minnesota; Marshall	Dropped: Iowa State; Arizona State	Dropped: NC State; Oregon; Bowling Green	Dropped: TCU; Texas Tech; UCLA	Dropped: Hawaii	Dropped: Arkansas	Dropped: Colorado State; LSU	

== BCS standings ==
The Bowl Championship Series (BCS) determined the two teams that competed in the BCS National Championship Game, the 2003 Fiesta Bowl.

	Week 9 Oct 21	Week 10 Oct 28	Week 11 Nov 4	Week 12 Nov 11	Week 13 Nov 18	Week 14 Nov 25	Week 15 Dec 2	Week 16 (Final) Dec 8	
1.	Oklahoma (7–0)	Oklahoma (7–0)	Oklahoma (8–0)	Ohio State (11–0)	Miami (FL) (9–0)	Miami (FL) (10–0)	Miami (FL) (11–0)	Miami (FL) (12–0)	1.
2.	Miami (FL) (6–0)	Miami (FL) (7–0)	Ohio State (10–0)	Miami (FL) (9–0)	Ohio State (12–0)	Ohio State (13–0)	Ohio State (13–0)	Ohio State (13–0)	2.
3.	Notre Dame (7–0)	Notre Dame (8–0)	Miami (FL) (8–0)	Washington State (9–1)	Washington State (9–1)	Oklahoma (10–1)	Georgia (11–1)	Georgia (12–1)	3.
4.	Virginia Tech (7–0)	Georgia (8–0)	Texas (8–1)	Oklahoma (8–1)	Oklahoma (9–1)	Georgia (10–1)	USC (10–2)	USC (10–2)	4.
5.	Georgia (7–0)	Ohio State (9–0)	Washington State (8–1)	Texas (9–1)	Georgia (10–1)	Iowa (11–1)	Iowa (11–1)	Iowa (11–1)	5.
6.	Ohio State (8–0)	Virginia Tech (8–0)	Georgia (8–1)	Georgia (9–1)	Notre Dame (9–1)	USC (9–2)	Washington State (9–2)	Washington State (10–2)	6.
7.	Washington State (6–1)	Texas (7–1)	Notre Dame (8–1)	Notre Dame (9–1)	Iowa (10–1)	Notre Dame (10–1)	Oklahoma (10–2)	Oklahoma (11–2)	7.
8.	Michigan (6–1)	Washington State (7–1)	Iowa (9–1)	Iowa (10–1)	USC (8–2)	Washington State (9–2)	Kansas State (10–2)	Kansas State (10–2)	8.
9.	LSU (6–1)	NC State (9–0)	USC (6–2)	USC (7–2)	Michigan (9–2)	Texas (9–2)	Texas (10–2)	Notre Dame (10–2)	9.
10.	Texas (6–1)	Iowa (8–1)	Virginia Tech (8–1)	Michigan (8–2)	Texas (9–2)	Kansas State (10–2)	Notre Dame (10–2)	Texas (10–2)	10.
11.	NC State (8–0)	USC (6–2)	Michigan (7–2)	Florida State (7–3)	Kansas State (9–2)	Michigan (9–3)	Michigan (9–3)	Michigan (9–3)	11.
12.	Florida State (5–2)	Colorado (6–2)	NC State (9–1)	Kansas State (8–2)	Florida State (8–3)	Colorado (8–3)	Colorado (9–3)	Penn State (9–3)	12.
13.	Iowa (7–1)	Michigan (6–2)	Florida State (6–3)	LSU (7–2)	Colorado (8–3)	Florida (8–3)	Penn State (9–3)	Colorado (9–4)	13.
14.	USC (5–2)	LSU (6–2)	Florida (6–3)	Florida (7–3)	Florida (8–3)	Penn State (9–3)	Florida State (9–4)	Florida State (9–4)	14.
15.	Oregon (6–1)	Kansas State (6–2)	Kansas State (7–2)	Penn State (7–3)	Penn State (8–3)	Colorado State (10–2)	West Virginia (9–3)	West Virginia (9–3)	15.
	Week 9 Oct 21	Week 10 Oct 28	Week 11 Nov 4	Week 12 Nov 11	Week 13 Nov 18	Week 14 Nov 25	Week 15 Dec 2	Week 16 (Final) Dec 8	
		Dropped: Florida State; Oregon	Dropped: Colorado; LSU	Dropped: NC State	Dropped: LSU	Dropped: Florida State	Dropped: Florida; Colorado State	None	
