= Brian Knorr =

American football player and coach (born 1963)

Current position
- Title: Assistant special teams coach
- Team: Michigan
- Conference: Big Ten

Biographical details
- Born: December 20, 1963 (age 62); Lenexa, Kansas, U.S.
- Education: Air Force (1986); Dayton (1991)

Playing career
- 1982–1985: Air Force
- Position: Quarterback

Coaching career (HC unless noted)
- 1992–1994: Air Force (assistant OL/JV)
- 1995–1998: Ohio (ILB)
- 1999–2000: Ohio (DC)
- 2001–2004: Ohio
- 2005–2006: Air Force (OLB/S)
- 2007: Air Force (AHC/ILB)
- 2008–2010: Wake Forest (WR)
- 2011: Wake Forest (co-DC/ILB)
- 2012: Wake Forest (DC/ILB)
- 2013: Wake Forest (DC/OLB)
- 2014–2015: Indiana (DC/DE/OLB)
- 2016: Ohio State (STQC)
- 2017: Arizona (STC/DE)
- 2018–2021: Air Force (AHC/ILB)
- 2022–2025: Air Force (DC/ILB)
- 2026–present: Michigan (asst. ST)

Head coaching record
- Overall: 11–35

Brian Knorr (born December 20, 1963) is an American college football coach, currently an assistant special teams coach at the University of Michigan. He was previously the defensive coordinator, assistant head coach and linebackers coach for the Air Force Falcons from 2018 to 2025. He was the head coach for the Ohio Bobcats from 2001 to 2004. He also coached at Wake Forest, Indiana, Ohio State and Arizona.

== Coaching career ==
He graduated from the Air Force Academy and played quarterback. He also was an assistant at the Air Force Academy when he went to Ohio University with Jim Grobe. He was the head coach of the Ohio Bobcats program from 2001 to 2004. He was fired on November 18, 2004, after he compiled an 11–35 (.239) record in four seasons. He was replaced by the more successful Frank Solich. He previously served as a defensive coordinator under the previous head coach, Grobe. His best season came in 2004, when his team went 4–7, including 2–6 in conference play. Until February 2008 he served as an assistant head coach at the Air Force Academy under head coach Troy Calhoun. In 2008, he accepted a position that reunited him with Grobe at Wake Forest University. In 2014 and 2015 he held the DC position for the Indiana Hoosiers football team. In January, 2016, Knorr did not have his contract renewed by Indiana.

On June 29, 2016, Knorr was hired by Ohio State as a Quality Control Assistant under coach Urban Meyer. Knorr left Ohio State to become the Special Teams and Defensive Ends coach at the University of Arizona. In March 2018, Knorr was Hired as an assistant head coach and linebackers coach at Air Force, making it his third stint at the Academy. He was promoted to defensive coordinator in 2022, serving four seasons in the role. In January 2026, he was hired by Kyle Whittingham as an assistant special teams coach at the University of Michigan.

== Head coaching record ==
Year	Team	Overall	Conference	Standing	Bowl/playoffs
Ohio Bobcats (Mid-American Conference) (2001–2004)
2001	Ohio	1–10	1–7	7th (East)	
2002	Ohio	4–8	4–4	4th (East)	
2003	Ohio	2–10	1–7	6th (East)	
2004	Ohio	4–7	2–6	5th (East)	
Ohio:		11–35	8–24		
Total:		11–35			
