= 2002 Motor City Bowl =

Boston College Eagles	Toledo Rockets
(8–4)	(9–4)
Big East	MAC
51	25
Head coach: Tom O'Brien	Head coach: Tom Amstutz
	1	2	3	4	Total
Boston College	14	28	6	3	51
Toledo	3	15	7	0	25
- Date: December 26, 2002
- Season: 2002
- Stadium: Ford Field
- Location: Detroit, Michigan
- MVP: Brian St. Pierre
- Favorite: Boston College by 4
- Attendance: 45,761

United States TV coverage
- Network: ESPN
- Announcers: Pam Ward, Chris Spielman, Rob Stone

The 2002 Motor City Bowl was a post-season college football bowl game between the Boston College Eagles and the Toledo Rockets on December 26, 2002, at Ford Field in Detroit, Michigan. Boston College scored touchdowns on its first six possessions and routed Toledo 51–25. It was the sixth time the Motor City Bowl had been played and the final game of the 2002 NCAA Division I FBS football season for both teams.

The game between the Mid-American Conference (MAC) team Toledo and Big East Conference Boston College was played at neutral-site Ford Field. This was the first Motor City Bowl played at Ford Field; all previous games were played at the Pontiac Silverdome. As then organized the Motor City Bowl matched a MAC team and a team from either the Big Ten, the Big East Conference, or an at-large team. Toledo accepted a bid for the Motor City Bowl after losing to Marshall in the MAC Championship Game. Toledo entered the bowl game as the defending champion, having defeated Cincinnati in the 2001 Motor City Bowl. Boston College was the first Big East team to play in the Motor City Bowl and was playing in its fourth straight bowl game.

The bowl game MVP was Boston College quarterback Brian St. Pierre, who completed 25 of 35 passes for 342 yards, a personal career high. Boston College scored on its first six possessions, and its 51 points set a Motor City Bowl record which would later be tied in the 2007 Motor City Bowl when the Purdue Boilermakers defeated the Central Michigan Chippewas 51–48. On a sour note two Toledo players were ejected during the game; one for throwing a punch and another for a late hit out of bounds on St. Pierre.
