= 2002 Kent State Golden Flashes football team =

American college football season

2002 Kent State Golden Flashes football
- Conference: Mid-American Conference
- East
- Record: 3–9 (1–7 MAC)
- Head coach: Dean Pees (5th season)
- Home stadium: Dix Stadium

2002 Mid-American Conference football standings
	Conf.			Overall
Team	W		L	W		L
East Division
No. 24 Marshall x$	7	–	1	11	–	2
UCF	6	–	2	7	–	5
Miami (OH)	5	–	3	7	–	5
Ohio	4	–	4	4	–	8
Akron	3	–	5	4	–	8
Kent State	1	–	7	3	–	9
Buffalo	0	–	8	1	–	11
West Division
Toledo xy	7	–	1	9	–	5
Northern Illinois x	7	–	1	8	–	4
Bowling Green	6	–	2	9	–	3
Ball State	4	–	4	6	–	6
Western Michigan	3	–	5	4	–	8
Central Michigan	2	–	6	4	–	8
Eastern Michigan	1	–	7	3	–	9
Championship: Marshall 49, Toledo 45
$ – Conference champion; x – Division champion/co-champions; Rankings from AP Poll

The 2002 Kent State Golden Flashes football team represented the Kent State University during the 2002 NCAA Division I-A football season. Kent State competed as a member of the Mid-American Conference (MAC), and played their home games at Dix Stadium. The Golden Flashes were led by fourth-year head coach Dean Pees.

Kent State compiled a 3–9 record (1–7 in conference games).

== Schedule ==
Date	Time	Opponent	Site	TV	Result	Attendance
August 29	7:00 pm	New Hampshire (I-AA)*	Dix Stadium; Kent, OH	ESPN+	W 34–7	16,073
September 7	12:00 pm	at No. 8 Ohio State*	Ohio Stadium; Columbus, OH		L 17–51	98,689
September 13	2:00 pm	Cal Poly (I-AA)*	Dix Stadium; Kent, OH		W 37–34	8,410
September 21	2:00 pm	at Miami (OH)	Yager Stadium; Oxford, OH		L 20–27	15,042
September 28	2:00 pm	at Northern Illinois	Huskie Stadium; DeKalb, IL		L 6–13	16,302
October 5	2:00 pm	Marshall	Dix Stadium; Kent, OH		L 21–42	15,337
October 19	2:00 pm	Ohio	Dix Stadium; Kent, OH		L 0–50	10,250
October 26	1:00 pm	at Buffalo	University at Buffalo Stadium; Amherst, NY		W 16–12	5,102
November 2	2:00 pm	No. 21 Bowling Green	Dix Stadium; Kent, OH (Battle for the Anniversary Award)		L 14–45	7,165
November 9	12:00 pm	at Connecticut*	Memorial Stadium; Storrs, CT		L 21–63	15,332
November 16	6:00 pm	at Central Florida	Citrus Bowl; Orlando, FL		L 6–32	7,354
November 23	2:00 pm	Akron	Dix Stadium; Kent, OH (Battle for the Wagon Wheel)		L 10–48	3,278
*Non-conference game; Rankings from AP Poll released prior to the game; All times are in Eastern time
