= 2002 Bowling Green Falcons football team =

American college football season

2002 Bowling Green Falcons football
- Conference: Mid-American Conference
- West
- Record: 9–3 (6–2 MAC)
- Head coach: Urban Meyer (2nd season)
- Offensive coordinator: Gregg Brandon (2nd season)
- Offensive scheme: Spread
- Defensive coordinator: Tim Beckman (5th season)
- Base defense: 4–3
- Home stadium: Doyt Perry Stadium

2002 Mid-American Conference football standings
	Conf.			Overall
Team	W		L	W		L
East Division
No. 24 Marshall x$	7	–	1	11	–	2
UCF	6	–	2	7	–	5
Miami (OH)	5	–	3	7	–	5
Ohio	4	–	4	4	–	8
Akron	3	–	5	4	–	8
Kent State	1	–	7	3	–	9
Buffalo	0	–	8	1	–	11
West Division
Toledo xy	7	–	1	9	–	5
Northern Illinois x	7	–	1	8	–	4
Bowling Green	6	–	2	9	–	3
Ball State	4	–	4	6	–	6
Western Michigan	3	–	5	4	–	8
Central Michigan	2	–	6	4	–	8
Eastern Michigan	1	–	7	3	–	9
Championship: Marshall 49, Toledo 45
$ – Conference champion; x – Division champion/co-champions; Rankings from AP Poll

The 2002 Bowling Green Falcons football team represented Bowling Green State University in the 2002 NCAA Division I-A football season. The team was coached by Urban Meyer and played their home games in Doyt Perry Stadium in Bowling Green, Ohio. It was the 84th season of play for the Falcons. Despite finishing 9-3, the Falcons were not invited to a bowl game.

== Schedule ==
Date	Time	Opponent	Rank	Site	TV	Result	Attendance
August 29	7:00 pm	Tennessee Tech*		Doyt Perry Stadium; Bowling Green, OH		W 41–7	15,696
September 14	6:00 pm	Missouri*		Doyt Perry Stadium; Bowling Green, OH		W 51–28	21,969
September 21	7:00 pm	at Kansas*		Memorial Stadium; Lawrence, KS		W 39–16	37,000
October 5	4:00 pm	Ohio^{†}		Doyt Perry Stadium; Bowling Green, OH	ONN	W 72–21	20,069
October 12	1:00 pm	at Central Michigan		Kelly/Shorts Stadium; Mount Pleasant, MI		W 45–35	24,127
October 19	6:00 pm	Western Michigan	No. 25	Doyt Perry Stadium; Bowling Green, OH		W 48–45 ^{OT}	15,169
October 26	4:00 pm	Ball State	No. 24	Doyt Perry Stadium; Bowling Green, OH		W 38–20	21,039
November 2	2:00 pm	at Kent State	No. 21	Dix Stadium; Kent, OH (Battle for the Anniversary Award)		W 45–14	7,165
November 9	2:30 pm	at Northern Illinois	No. 20	Huskie Stadium; DeKalb, IL	FSN	L 17–26	25,822
November 16	7:00 pm	at South Florida*		Raymond James Stadium; Tampa, FL		L 7–29	28,098
November 23	6:00 pm	Eastern Michigan		Doyt Perry Stadium; Bowling Green, OH		W 63–21	12,974
November 30	7:00 pm	at Toledo		Glass Bowl; Toledo, OH (Peace Pipe Trophy)		L 24–42	25,331
*Non-conference game; ^{†}Homecoming; Rankings from AP Poll released prior to the game; All times are in Eastern time
