= 2002 Seattle Bowl =

Wake Forest Demon Deacons	Oregon Ducks
(6–6)	(7–5)
38	17
Head coach: Jim Grobe	Head coach: Mike Bellotti
	1	2	3	4	Total
Wake Forest	7	14	10	7	38
Oregon	3	7	7	0	17
- Date: December 30, 2002
- Season: 2002
- Stadium: Seahawks Stadium
- Location: Seattle, Washington
- Favorite: Oregon by 8.5
- Referee: Bill Athan (WAC)
- Attendance: 38,241
- Payout: US$1 million per team

United States TV coverage
- Network: ESPN
- Announcers: Steve Levy (play-by-play); Rod Gilmore (analyst); Alex Flanagan (sidelines)

The 2002 Seattle Bowl was the second and final edition of the college football bowl game (known for the previous 3 years as the Oahu Bowl, before moving to Seattle), and was played at Seahawks Stadium in Seattle, Washington. The game pitted the University of Oregon Ducks from the Pac-10 and the Wake Forest University Demon Deacons from the ACC. The game was the final competition of the 2002 football season for each team and resulted in a 38–17 Wake Forest victory.

== Game summary ==
Scoring summary

Quarter	Time	Drive			Team	Scoring information	Score	
Quarter	Time	Plays	Yards	TOP	Team	Scoring information	Wake Forest	Oregon
1	12:25		8 plays, 31 yards		Oregon	45-yard field goal by Jared Siegel	0	3
1	10:26		7 plays, 65 yards		Wake Forest	Ovie Mughelli 1-yard touchdown run, Matt Wisnosky kick good	7	3
2	12:38		5 plays, 77 yards		Wake Forest	Jason Anderson 57-yard touchdown reception from James MacPherson, Matt Wisnosky kick good	14	3
2	2:40		9 plays, 73 yards		Wake Forest	James MacPherson 1-yard touchdown run, Matt Wisnosky kick good	21	3
2	0:26		8 plays, 61 yards		Oregon	Samie Parker 7-yard touchdown reception from Kellen Clemens, Jared Siegel kick good	21	10
3	9:37		14 plays, 39 yards		Wake Forest	43-yard field goal by Matt Wisnosky	24	10
3	5:39		4 plays, 42 yards		Oregon	Matt Floberg 1-yard touchdown run, Jared Siegel kick good	24	17
3	2:02		3 plays, 65 yards		Wake Forest	Jason Anderson 63-yard touchdown reception from James MacPherson, Matt Wisnosky kick good	31	17
4	2:48		7 plays, 44 yards		Wake Forest	Chris Barclay 12-yard touchdown run, Matt Wisnosky kick good	38	17
"TOP" = time of possession. For other American football terms, see Glossary of American football.							38	17
