= 2002 Ball State Cardinals football team =

American college football season

2002 Ball State Cardinals football
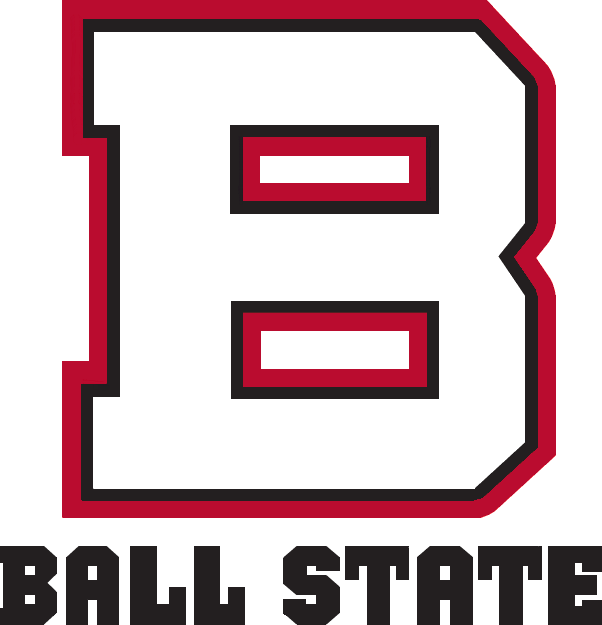
- Conference: Mid-American Conference
- West Division
- Record: 6–6 (4–4 MAC)
- Head coach: Bill Lynch (8th season)
- Home stadium: Ball State Stadium

2002 Mid-American Conference football standings
	Conf.			Overall
Team	W		L	W		L
East Division
No. 24 Marshall x$	7	–	1	11	–	2
UCF	6	–	2	7	–	5
Miami (OH)	5	–	3	7	–	5
Ohio	4	–	4	4	–	8
Akron	3	–	5	4	–	8
Kent State	1	–	7	3	–	9
Buffalo	0	–	8	1	–	11
West Division
Toledo xy	7	–	1	9	–	5
Northern Illinois x	7	–	1	8	–	4
Bowling Green	6	–	2	9	–	3
Ball State	4	–	4	6	–	6
Western Michigan	3	–	5	4	–	8
Central Michigan	2	–	6	4	–	8
Eastern Michigan	1	–	7	3	–	9
Championship: Marshall 49, Toledo 45
$ – Conference champion; x – Division champion/co-champions; Rankings from AP Poll

The 2002 Ball State Cardinals football team represented Ball State University during the 2002 NCAA Division I-A football season. The Cardinals were led by eighth-year head coach Bill Lynch. The Cardinals played their home games at Ball State Stadium as members of the West Division of the Mid-American Conference (MAC). They finished the season 6–6, 4–4 in MAC play to finish in third place in the West Division. After the season, Lynch was fired as the Cardinals' head coach. Despite finishing the season with a 6–6 record, the Cardinals did not participate in a bowl game.

== Schedule ==
Date	Opponent	Site	Result	Attendance
September 7	at Missouri*	Faurot Field; Columbia, MO	L 6–41	49,282
September 14	Indiana State*	Ball State Stadium; Muncie, IN (Blue Key Victory Bell)	W 23–21	12,924
September 21	at Clemson*	Memorial Stadium; Clemson, SC	L 7–30	70,000
September 28	at Connecticut*	Memorial Stadium; Storrs, CT	W 24–21 ^{OT}	16,849
October 5	Northern Illinois	Ball State Stadium; Muncie, IN (rivalry)	L 29–41	14,499
October 12	at Toledo	Glass Bowl; Toledo, OH	L 17–37	25,926
October 19	Eastern Michigan	Ball State Stadium; Muncie, IN	W 42–17	15,975
October 26	at No. 24 Bowling Green	Doyt Perry Stadium; Bowling Green, OH	L 20–38	21,039
November 2	Western Michigan	Ball State Stadium; Muncie, IN	W 17–7	12,892
November 16	at Central Michigan	Kelly/Shorts Stadium; Mount Pleasant, MI	W 38–21	8,235
November 23	Buffalo	Ball State Stadium; Muncie, IN	W 41–21	7,957
November 30	at Marshall	Marshall University Stadium; Huntington, WV	L 14–38	23,824
*Non-conference game; Rankings from AP Poll released prior to the game

== Roster ==
2002 Ball State Cardinals football team roster
Players			Coaches
Offense: Pos. / # / Name / Class; WR / 86 / Dante Ridgeway / Fr	Defense: Pos. / # / Name / Class	Special teams: Pos. / # / Name / Class; P / 30 / Reggie Hodges / Jr	Head coach: Bill Lynch; Coordinators/assistant coaches Legend: (C) Team captain; (S) Suspended; (I) Ineligible; Injured; Redshirt; Roster; Last update: 2002-10-02
