= 2002 Central Michigan Chippewas football team =

American college football season

2002 Central Michigan Chippewas football
- Conference: Mid-American Conference
- West Division
- Record: 4–8 (2–6 MAC)
- Head coach: Mike DeBord (3rd season)
- MVP: Robbie Mixon
- Home stadium: Kelly/Shorts Stadium

2002 Mid-American Conference football standings
	Conf.			Overall
Team	W		L	W		L
East Division
No. 24 Marshall x$	7	–	1	11	–	2
UCF	6	–	2	7	–	5
Miami (OH)	5	–	3	7	–	5
Ohio	4	–	4	4	–	8
Akron	3	–	5	4	–	8
Kent State	1	–	7	3	–	9
Buffalo	0	–	8	1	–	11
West Division
Toledo xy	7	–	1	9	–	5
Northern Illinois x	7	–	1	8	–	4
Bowling Green	6	–	2	9	–	3
Ball State	4	–	4	6	–	6
Western Michigan	3	–	5	4	–	8
Central Michigan	2	–	6	4	–	8
Eastern Michigan	1	–	7	3	–	9
Championship: Marshall 49, Toledo 45
$ – Conference champion; x – Division champion/co-champions; Rankings from AP Poll

The 2002 Central Michigan Chippewas football team represented Central Michigan University in the Mid-American Conference (MAC) during the 2002 NCAA Division I-A football season. In their third season under head coach Mike DeBord, the Chippewas compiled a 4–8 record (2–6 against MAC opponents), finished in sixth place in the MAC's West Division, and were outscored by their opponents, 384 to 267. The team played its home games in Kelly/Shorts Stadium in Mount Pleasant, Michigan, with attendance of 103,865 in six home games.

The team's statistical leaders included Derrick Vickers with 1,828 passing yards, Robbie Mixon with 1,361 rushing yards, and Rob Turner with 506 receiving yards. At the time, Mixon's 1,361 yards ranked as the seventh best season total in Central Michigan history. Mixon also set a Mid-American Conference record with 377 rushing yards (on 43 carries) in a 47–21 victory over against Eastern Michigan on November 2, 2002. Mixon was also selected at the end of the 2002 season as the team's most valuable player.

Jovan Clark had 20 tackles for loss for 62 yards, which was at the time tied for the second best total in school history. Offensive guard Kyle Croskey was selected as a first-team All-MAC player.

== Schedule ==
Date	Opponent	Site	Result	Attendance	Source
August 29	Sam Houston State*	Kelly/Shorts Stadium; Mount Pleasant, MI	W 34–10	18,826	
September 7	Wyoming*	Kelly/Shorts Stadium; Mount Pleasant, MI	W 32–20	18,251	
September 14	at Akron	Rubber Bowl; Akron, OH	W 24–17	15,629	
September 21	at Indiana*	Memorial Stadium; Bloomington, IN	L 29–39	32,740	
September 28	at Boston College*	Alumni Stadium; Chestnut Hill, MA	L 0–43	41,826	
October 12	Bowling Green	Kelly/Shorts Stadium; Mount Pleasant, MI	L 35–45	24,127	
October 19	at Northern Illinois	Huskie Stadium; DeKalb, IL	L 0–49	20,186	
October 26	Marshall	Kelly/Shorts Stadium; Mount Pleasant, MI	L 18–23	14,564	
November 2	at Eastern Michigan	Rynearson Stadium; Ypsilanti, MI (rivalry)	W 47–21		
November 9	at Toledo	Glass Bowl; Toledo, OH	L 17–44	18,944	
November 16	Ball State	Kelly/Shorts Stadium; Mount Pleasant, MI	L 21–38	8,235	
November 23	Western Michigan	Kelly/Shorts Stadium; Mount Pleasant, MI (rivalry)	L 10–35	19,862	
*Non-conference game

== Roster ==
2002 Central Michigan Chippewas football team roster
Players
Coaches
Offense

Pos.	#	Name	Class
WR	1	Obed Cetoute-Genaille	Fr
WR	2	Markus Naves	Fr
RB	6	Robbie Mixon	Sr
WR	7	Steve Messam	Jr
WR	9	Willie Hill	Jr
QB	10	Derrick Vickers	Jr
RB	13	Lance Gailliard	Fr
QB	14	Kent Smith	Fr
QB	15	Derek Gorney	Sr
WR	16	Roderick Means	Sr
QB	17	Grant Arnoldink	So
WR	18	Rob Turner	Sr
RB	19	Mike Pryce	Fr
RB	20	Alan Parks	Sr
RB	21	Kenan Lawhorne	Jr
RB	22	Dion Shields	Fr
FB	49	Adam Supianoski	Jr
OL	68	Jay Gillette	Fr
C	69	Eric Ghiaciuc	So
OT	70	Adam Kieft	So
OT	72	Jeff Jenerou	Jr
OT	73	Tom Langton	Sr
OL	75	Troy Golba	So
OL	77	Dean Zarafonetis	So
WR	81	Justin Harper	Fr
WR	83	Nick Thompson	Jr
TE	85	Tory Humphrey	So

Defense

Pos.	#	Name	Class
FS	5	Ron Bartell	So
CB	8	Tyrone Kelly	Fr
FS	20	Matt Gorman	Fr
DB	22	Mike Thomas	So
CB	23	Fabrice Raymond	Fr
DB	24	James King	Jr
DE	41	Cullen Jenkins	Sr
LB	50	Dexter Scott	Fr
DL	71	Thomas Patrick	So

Special teams

Pos.	#	Name	Class
PK	3	Christopher Stoffel	Fr
PK	17	Andrew Christofferson	So
P	40	Brian Brandt	Jr

Head coach

- Mike DeBord

Coordinators/assistant coaches

Legend

- (C) Team captain
- (S) Suspended
- (I) Ineligible
- Injured
- Redshirt

Roster
