= 2002 Navy Midshipmen football team =

American college football season

2002 Navy Midshipmen football
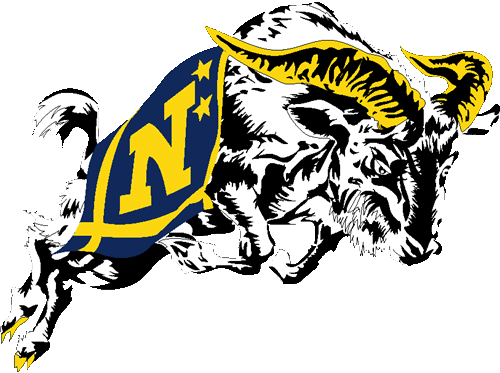
- Conference: Independent
- Record: 2–10
- Head coach: Paul Johnson (1st season)
- Offensive scheme: Triple option
- Defensive coordinator: Buddy Green (1st season)
- Base defense: Multiple
- MVP: Bryce McDonald
- Captains: Donnie Fricks; Josh Brindel
- Home stadium: Navy–Marine Corps Memorial Stadium

2002 NCAA Division I-A independents football records
	Conf.			Overall
Team	W		L	W		L
South Florida		–		9	–	2
No. 17 Notre Dame		–		10	–	3
Connecticut		–		6	–	6
Utah State		–		4	–	7
Troy State		–		4	–	8
Navy		–		2	–	10
Rankings from AP Poll

The 2002 Navy Midshipmen football team represented the United States Naval Academy (USNA) as an independent during the 2002 NCAA Division I-A football season. The team was led by first-year head coach Paul Johnson.

== Schedule ==
Date	Time	Opponent	Site	TV	Result	Attendance
August 31	8:00 p.m.	at SMU	Gerald J. Ford Stadium; University Park, TX (rivalry)		W 38–7	25,744
September 7	12:00 p.m.	No. 21 NC State	Navy–Marine Corps Memorial Stadium; Annapolis, MD		L 19–65	29,613
September 21	12:00 p.m.	Northwestern	Navy–Marine Corps Memorial Stadium; Annapolis, MD	HDNet	L 40–49	27,012
September 28	12:00 p.m.	Duke^{†}	Navy–Marine Corps Memorial Stadium; Annapolis, MD	HDNet	L 17–43	31,647
October 5	3:00 p.m.	at Air Force	Falcon Stadium; Colorado Springs, CO (Commander-in-Chief's Trophy)		L 7–48	48,550
October 12	12:00 p.m.	Rice	Navy–Marine Corps Memorial Stadium; Annapolis, MD	HDNet	L 10–17	25,104
October 19	12:00 p.m.	at Boston College	Alumni Stadium; Chestnut Hill, MA		L 21–46	41,322
October 26	3:30 p.m.	at Tulane	Tad Gormley Stadium; New Orleans, LA		L 30–51	27,417
November 9	12:00 p.m.	No. 9 Notre Dame	Ravens Stadium; Baltimore, MD (rivalry)	CBS	L 23–30	70,260
November 16	12:00 p.m.	Connecticut	Navy–Marine Corps Memorial Stadium; Annapolis, MD		L 0–38	25,664
November 23	3:30 p.m.	at Wake Forest	Groves Stadium; Winston-Salem, NC		L 27–30	22,811
December 7		vs. Army	Giants Stadium; East Rutherford, NJ (Army–Navy Game)	CBS	W 58–12	
^{†}Homecoming; Rankings from AP Poll released prior to the game; All times are in Eastern time

== Roster ==
2002 Navy Midshipmen football team roster
Players
Coaches
Offense

Pos.	#	Name	Class
WR	3	Dominic Bailey	Jr
RB	46	Ryan Barry	So
OT	70	Tucker Bennett	Fr
WR	10	J.P. Blecksmith	Sr
QB	11	Craig Candeto	Jr
RB	39	Marvin Dingle	Fr
RB	15	Frank Divis	So
RB	32	Kyle Eckel	So
OT	66	Josh Goodin	Jr
RB	8	Cece Harris	Jr
OT	65	Derek Jaskowiak	So
WR	17	Amir Jenkins	So
RB	21	Tony Lane	Jr
G	76	Grant Moody	Sr
RB	24	Bryce McDonald	Jr
WR	4	Mike McIlravy	So
QB	19	Andy Michalowicz	Jr
QB	2	Lamar Owens	Fr
C	74	August Roitsch	So
QB	6	Aaron Polanco	So
RB	34	Eric Roberts	Fr
G	71	Matt Nye	Sr

Defense

Pos.	#	Name	Class
DE	94	Steve Adair	So
NT	91	Babatunde Akingbemi	So
DT	96	Pete Beuttenmuller	Sr
CB	16	Shalimar Brazier	Jr
DT	54	Josh Brindel	Jr
CB	29	David Bush	Jr
LB	56	Eddie Carthan	Jr
DE	91	Jeremy Chase	Fr
LB	53	T.J. Costello	So
CB	37	Sina Ekundayo	Fr
LB	55	Dustin Elliott	So
S	13	Joey Fay	So
CB	19	Matt Furgan	So
CB	9	Justin Golson	So
DE	95	Ralph Henry	Jr
DE	54	Adam Horne	Fr
S	24	Wayne Irons	Fr
LB	22	Lane Jackson	So
CB	23	Vaughn Kelley	So
LB	50	Ben Mathews	Jr
LB	40	Ryan McCabe	So
LB	51	Bobby McClarin	So
DE	90	Sean McElhannon	So
S	28	Lane Montgomery	Fr
LB	1	Jason Monts	Fr

Special teams

Pos.	#	Name	Class

Head coach

- Paul Johnson

Coordinators/assistant coaches

- Brian Bohannon (wide receivers)

Legend

- (C) Team captain
- (S) Suspended
- (I) Ineligible
- Injured
- Redshirt

Roster
Last update: 2002-10-14
