= 2002 Wake Forest Demon Deacons football team =

American college football season

2002 Wake Forest Demon Deacons football

Seattle Bowl champion

Seattle Bowl, W 38–17 vs. Oregon
- Conference: Atlantic Coast Conference
- Record: 7–6 (3–5 ACC)
- Head coach: Jim Grobe (2nd season)
- Offensive coordinator: Troy Calhoun (2nd season)
- Offensive scheme: Multiple
- Defensive coordinator: Dean Hood (2nd season)
- Base defense: 4–3
- Captain: Game captains
- Home stadium: Groves Stadium

2002 Atlantic Coast Conference football standings
	Conf.			Overall
Team	W		L	W		L
No. 21 Florida State $	7	–	1	9	–	5
No. 22 Virginia	6	–	2	9	–	5
No. 13 Maryland	6	–	2	11	–	3
No. 12 NC State	5	–	3	11	–	3
Clemson	4	–	4	7	–	6
Georgia Tech	4	–	4	7	–	6
Wake Forest	3	–	5	7	–	6
North Carolina	1	–	7	3	–	9
Duke	0	–	8	2	–	10
$ – BCS representative as conference champion; Rankings from AP Poll

The 2002 Wake Forest Demon Deacons football team was an American football team that represented Wake Forest University as a member of the Atlantic Coast Conference (ACC) during the 2002 NCAA Division I-A football season. In their second season under head coach Jim Grobe, the Demon Deacons compiled a 7–6 record (3–5 in conference games), outscored opponents by a total of 356 to 327, and finished in a tie for seventh place in the ACC.

The team's statistical leaders included James MacPherson (1,837 passing yards), Tarence Williams (852 rushing yards), Fabian Davis (575 receiving yards), and Matt Wisnosky (84 points scored, 33 extra points, 17 field goals).

The team played its home games at Groves Stadium in Winston-Salem, North Carolina.

== Schedule ==
Date	Time	Opponent	Site	TV	Result	Attendance
August 29	7:30 pm	at Northern Illinois*	Huskie Stadium; DeKalb, IL	FSN	L 41–42 ^{OT}	19,653
September 7	6:30 pm	East Carolina*	Groves Stadium; Winston-Salem, NC		W 27–22	28,486
September 14	7:00 pm	at No. 19 NC State	Carter–Finley Stadium; Raleigh, NC (rivalry)		L 13–32	51,094
September 21	2:00 pm	at Purdue*	Ross–Ade Stadium; West Lafayette, IN		W 24–21	48,550
September 28	6:30 pm	Virginia	Groves Stadium; Winston-Salem, NC		L 34–38	25,883
October 5	3:30 pm	at Georgia Tech	Bobby Dodd Stadium; Atlanta, GA	ABC	W 24–21	43,719
October 12	3:30 pm	Duke^{†}	Groves Stadium; Winston-Salem, NC (rivalry)		W 36–10	25,856
October 19	3:30 pm	at Clemson	Memorial Stadium; Clemson, SC	ABC	L 23–31	81,008
October 26	12:00 pm	North Carolina	Groves Stadium; Winston-Salem, NC (rivalry)	JPS	W 31–0	31,476
November 2	4:00 pm	No. 18 Florida State	Groves Stadium; Winston-Salem, NC	ESPN2	L 21–34	24,710
November 23	3:30 pm	Navy*	Groves Stadium; Winston-Salem, NC		W 30–27	22,811
November 30	3:30 pm	at No. 25 Maryland	Byrd Stadium; College Park, MD	ESPN	L 14–32	39,006
December 30	5:00 pm	vs. Oregon*	Seahawks Stadium; Seattle, WA (Seattle Bowl)	ESPN	W 38–17	38,241
*Non-conference game; ^{†}Homecoming; Rankings from AP Poll released prior to the game; All times are in Eastern time

== Team leaders ==
Category	Team Leader	Att/Cth	Yds
Passing	James MacPherson	123/223	1,837
Rushing	Tarence Williams	186	852
Receiving	Jax Landfried	38	533
