= 2002 UCF Golden Knights football team =

American college football season

2002 UCF Golden Knights football
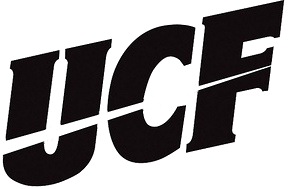
- Conference: Mid-American Conference
- East Division
- Record: 7–5 (6–2 MAC)
- Head coach: Mike Kruczek (5th season)
- Offensive coordinator: Robert McFarland (2nd season)
- Defensive coordinator: Bill D'Ottavio (1st season)
- Home stadium: Florida Citrus Bowl

2002 Mid-American Conference football standings
	Conf.			Overall
Team	W		L	W		L
East Division
No. 24 Marshall x$	7	–	1	11	–	2
UCF	6	–	2	7	–	5
Miami (OH)	5	–	3	7	–	5
Ohio	4	–	4	4	–	8
Akron	3	–	5	4	–	8
Kent State	1	–	7	3	–	9
Buffalo	0	–	8	1	–	11
West Division
Toledo xy	7	–	1	9	–	5
Northern Illinois x	7	–	1	8	–	4
Bowling Green	6	–	2	9	–	3
Ball State	4	–	4	6	–	6
Western Michigan	3	–	5	4	–	8
Central Michigan	2	–	6	4	–	8
Eastern Michigan	1	–	7	3	–	9
Championship: Marshall 49, Toledo 45
$ – Conference champion; x – Division champion/co-champions; Rankings from AP Poll

The 2002 UCF Golden Knights football team represented the University of Central Florida in the 2002 NCAA Division I-A football season. Their head coach was Mike Kruczek, who was in his fifth season with the team. 2002 marked the Golden Knights first season in the Mid-American Conference, in the East Division. This was the first time UCF had joined a conference since ascending to the NCAA Division I Football Bowl Subdivision in 1996.

On opening day, UCF once again played up to a ranked opponent on the road, but failed to pull off the upset. Trailing 10–9 at halftime against Penn State, a near-disastrous third quarter saw the Golden Knights fall behind 20–9. In the fourth quarter UCF rallied. Quarterback Ryan Schneider capped off an 80–yard drive with a 6–yard touchdown pass to Tavaris Capers with 24 seconds to go. With the score 27–24, a failed onside kick attempt sealed the victory for the Nittany Lions.

UCF's first conference game came on September 20 against eventual MAC champion Marshall. With Thundering Herd quarterback Byron Leftwich faltering throughout the night, UCF largely failed to capitalize. Trailing 21–26 in the final three minutes, UCF intercepted Leftwich, and subsequently drove to the Marshall 26–yard line. Facing 4th & 3 at the Marshall 26, Ryan Schneider was picked off by Terence Tarpley. Marshall ran out the clock, and held on for the victory. The Knights first conference victory in the MAC came at Western Michigan on October 12. Finishing the season with a winning record (7–5 overall, 6–2 conference), UCF did not receive a bowl berth.

== Schedule ==
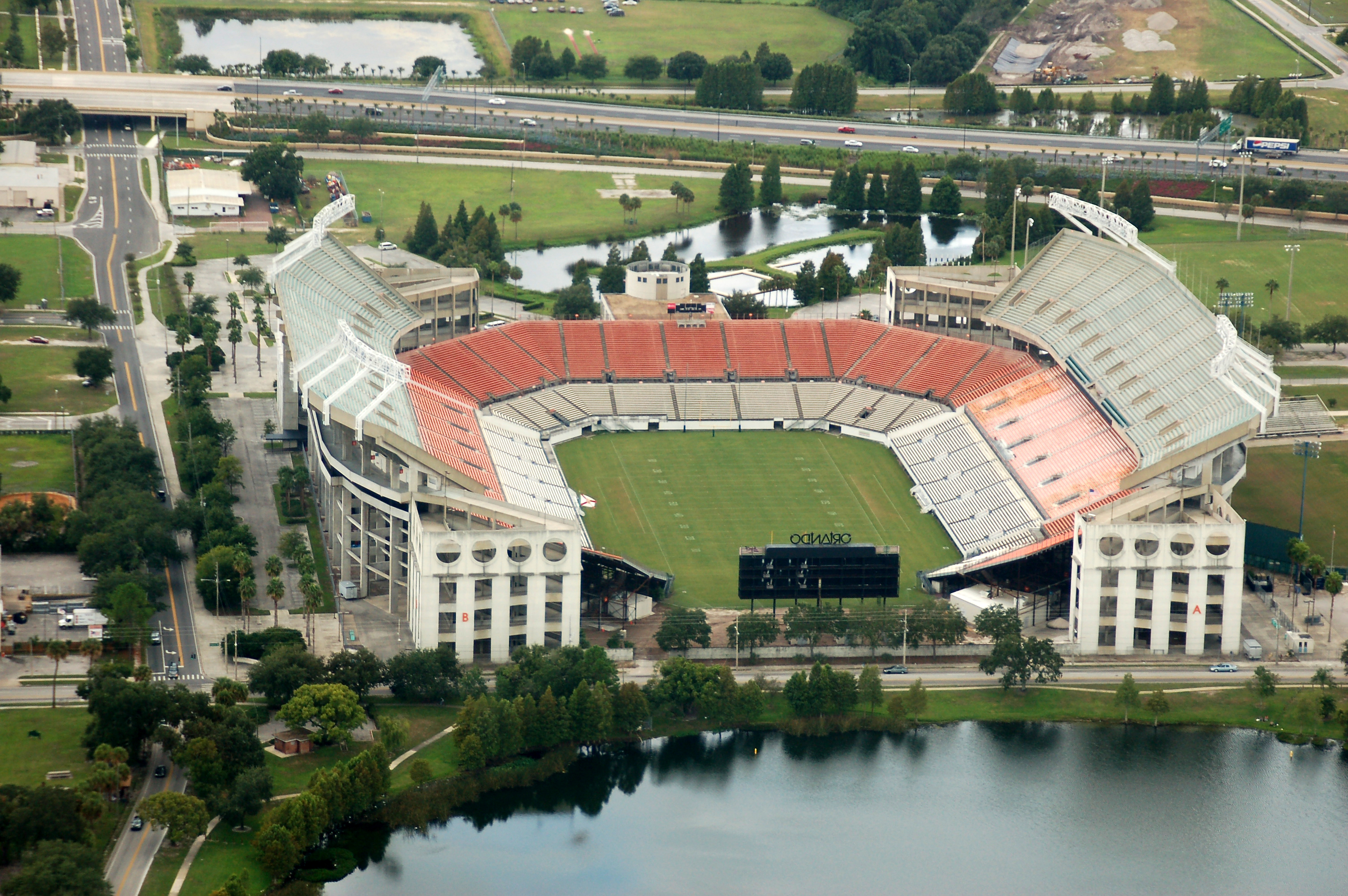
The Citrus Bowl, the Knights home field

Date	Time	Opponent	Site	TV	Result	Attendance
August 31	12:10 pm	at No. 24 Penn State*	Beaver Stadium; University Park, PA	ESPN	L 24–27	103,029
September 7	10:00 pm	at Arizona State*	Sun Devil Stadium; Tempe, AZ		L 13–46	43,401
September 20	7:00 pm	at Marshall	Marshall University Stadium; Huntington, WV	ESPN2	L 21–26	32,900
September 28	6:00 pm	Liberty*	Florida Citrus Bowl; Orlando, FL		W 48–17	20,416
October 12	3:30 pm	at Western Michigan	Waldo Stadium; Kalamazoo, MI		W 31–27	21,505
October 19	6:00 pm	Toledo	Florida Citrus Bowl; Orlando, FL	SUN	L 24–27	17,119
October 26	4:00 pm	Akron^{†}	Florida Citrus Bowl; Orlando, FL		W 28–17	18,278
November 2	7:00 pm	Syracuse*	Florida Citrus Bowl; Orlando, FL	ESPN	L 35–38	24,043
November 9	1:00 pm	at Buffalo	University at Buffalo Stadium; Buffalo, NY		W 45–21	6,923
November 16	6:00 pm	Kent State	Citrus Bowl; Orlando, FL		W 32–6	7,354
November 23	1:30 pm	at Miami (OH)	Yager Stadium; Oxford, OH		W 48–31	7,962
November 30	1:00 pm	Ohio	Florida Citrus Bowl; Orlando, FL		W 42–32	12,462
*Non-conference game; ^{†}Homecoming; Rankings from AP Poll released prior to the game; All times are in Eastern time
