= 2002 Georgia Tech Yellow Jackets football team =

American college football season

2002 Georgia Tech Yellow Jackets football

Silicon Valley Football Classic, L 21–30 vs. Fresno State
- Conference: Atlantic Coast Conference
- Record: 7–6 (4–4 ACC)
- Head coach: Chan Gailey (1st season)
- Offensive coordinator: Bill O'Brien (2nd season)
- Offensive scheme: Mixed Shotgun & Ace
- Defensive coordinator: Jon Tenuta (1st season)
- Home stadium: Bobby Dodd Stadium (Capacity: 43,719)

2002 Atlantic Coast Conference football standings
	Conf.			Overall
Team	W		L	W		L
No. 21 Florida State $	7	–	1	9	–	5
No. 22 Virginia	6	–	2	9	–	5
No. 13 Maryland	6	–	2	11	–	3
No. 12 NC State	5	–	3	11	–	3
Clemson	4	–	4	7	–	6
Georgia Tech	4	–	4	7	–	6
Wake Forest	3	–	5	7	–	6
North Carolina	1	–	7	3	–	9
Duke	0	–	8	2	–	10
$ – BCS representative as conference champion; Rankings from AP Poll

The 2002 Georgia Tech Yellow Jackets football team represented the Georgia Institute of Technology in the 2002 NCAA Division I-A football season. The team's coach was Chan Gailey, the former head coach of the NFL's Dallas Cowboys from 1998-1999. It played its home games at Bobby Dodd Stadium in Atlanta.

== Schedule ==
Date	Time	Opponent	Site	TV	Result	Attendance
August 31	6:00 pm	Vanderbilt*	Bobby Dodd Stadium; Atlanta, GA (rivalry)		W 45–3	43,719
September 7	3:30 pm	at Connecticut*	Memorial Stadium; Storrs, CT	FSN	W 31–14	16,751
September 14	12:00 pm	at Clemson	Memorial Stadium; Clemson, SC (rivalry)	ESPN	L 19–24	77,586
September 21	3:30 pm	BYU*	Bobby Dodd Stadium; Atlanta, GA	ABC	W 28–19	43,719
September 28	3:30 pm	at North Carolina	Kenan Memorial Stadium; Chapel Hill, NC	ABC	W 21–13	57,000
October 5	3:30 pm	Wake Forest	Bobby Dodd Stadium; Atlanta, GA	ABC	L 21–24	43,719
October 17	7:45 pm	at Maryland	Byrd Stadium; College Park, MD	ESPN	L 10–34	41,766
October 26	3:30 pm	Virginia^{†}	Bobby Dodd Stadium; Atlanta, GA	ABC	W 23–15	42,727
November 2	3:30 pm	at No. 10 NC State	Carter–Finley Stadium; Raleigh, NC	ABC	W 24–17	51,500
November 9	3:30 pm	No. 17 Florida State	Bobby Dodd Stadium; Atlanta, GA	ABC	L 13–21	43,719
November 16	1:00 pm	Duke	Bobby Dodd Stadium; Atlanta, GA		W 17–2	41,335
November 30	3:30 pm	at No. 5 Georgia*	Sanford Stadium; Athens, GA (Clean, Old-Fashioned Hate)	CBS	L 7–51	86,520
December 31	3:30 pm	vs. Fresno State*	Spartan Stadium; San Jose, CA (Silicon Valley Football Classic)	ESPN	L 21–30	10,142
*Non-conference game; ^{†}Homecoming; Rankings from AP Poll released prior to the game; All times are in Eastern time

== Roster ==
2002 Georgia Tech Yellow Jackets football team roster
Players
Coaches
Offense

Pos.	#	Name	Class
RB	48	P. J. Daniels	So
OT	70	Nat Dorsey	So
TE	89	John Paul Foschi	Jr
RB	24	Tony Hollings	Jr
G	72	Brad Honeycutt	Fr
WR	82	Jonathan Smith	Jr
QB	17	A. J. Suggs	Jr

Defense

Pos.	#	Name	Class
DE	44	Tony Hargrove	So
SS	34	Jack Rogers	Sr
DB	18	Chris Reis	Fr
LB	51	Daryl Smith	Jr

Special teams

Pos.	#	Name	Class

Head coach

- Chan Gailey

Coordinators/assistant coaches

- Bill O'Brien – Offensive coordinator/quarterbacks
- Patrick Nix – Running backs/recruiting coordinator
- Tommie Robinson – Wide receivers
- Joe D'Alessandris – Offensive line
- Jon Tenuta – Defensive coordinator
- Glenn Spencer – Defensive line
- Brick Haley – Linebackers
- Curtis Modkins – Defensive backs
- Tommy Raye – Special teams coordinator

Legend

- (C) Team captain
- (S) Suspended
- (I) Ineligible
- Injured
- Redshirt

Roster
Last update: 2002-10-17
