= 2002 Western Michigan Broncos football team =

American college football season

2002 Western Michigan Broncos football
- Conference: Mid-American Conference
- West Division
- Record: 4–8 (3–5 MAC)
- Head coach: Gary Darnell (6th season)
- Offensive coordinator: Brian Rock (3rd season)
- MVP: Jason Feldpausch
- Home stadium: Waldo Stadium

2002 Mid-American Conference football standings
	Conf.			Overall
Team	W		L	W		L
East Division
No. 24 Marshall x$	7	–	1	11	–	2
UCF	6	–	2	7	–	5
Miami (OH)	5	–	3	7	–	5
Ohio	4	–	4	4	–	8
Akron	3	–	5	4	–	8
Kent State	1	–	7	3	–	9
Buffalo	0	–	8	1	–	11
West Division
Toledo xy	7	–	1	9	–	5
Northern Illinois x	7	–	1	8	–	4
Bowling Green	6	–	2	9	–	3
Ball State	4	–	4	6	–	6
Western Michigan	3	–	5	4	–	8
Central Michigan	2	–	6	4	–	8
Eastern Michigan	1	–	7	3	–	9
Championship: Marshall 49, Toledo 45
$ – Conference champion; x – Division champion/co-champions; Rankings from AP Poll

The 2002 Western Michigan Broncos football team represented Western Michigan University in the Mid-American Conference (MAC) during the 2002 NCAA Division I-A football season. In their sixth season under head coach Gary Darnell, the Broncos compiled a 4–8 record (3–5 against MAC opponents), finished in fifth place in the MAC's West Division, and were outscored by their opponents, 330 to 303. The team played its home games in Waldo Stadium in Kalamazoo, Michigan.

The team's statistical leaders included Chad Munson with 2,160 passing yards, Philip Reed with 1,053 rushing yards, and Jermaine Lewis with 654 receiving yards.

== Schedule ==
Date	Time	Opponent	Site	TV	Result	Attendance	Source
August 29	6:30 p.m.	Indiana State*	Waldo Stadium; Kalamazoo, MI		W 48–17		
September 7	12:10 p.m.	at No. 7 Michigan*	Michigan Stadium; Ann Arbor, MI	ESPN	L 12–35	107,856	
September 14	1:00 p.m.	at Purdue*	Ross–Ade Stadium; West Lafayette, IN		L 24–28	55,140	
September 28	12:00 p.m.	No. 5 Virginia Tech*	Waldo Stadium; Kalamazoo, MI	ESPN Plus	L 0–30	27,218	
October 5	1:00 p.m.	at Buffalo	University at Buffalo Stadium; Amherst, NY		W 31–17	8,112	
October 12	3:30 p.m.	UCF	Waldo Stadium; Kalamazoo, MI		L 27–31	21,505	
October 19	6:00 p.m.	at No. 25 Bowling Green	Doyt Perry Stadium; Bowling Green, OH		L 45–48 ^{OT}	15,169	
October 26	12:00 p.m.	Northern Illinois	Waldo Stadium; Kalamazoo, MI		L 20–24	15,049	
November 2		at Ball State	Ball State Stadium; Muncie, IN		L 7–17	12,892	
November 9	1:00 p.m.	Eastern Michigan	Waldo Stadium; Kalamazoo, MI		W 33–31	11,381	
November 16	3:30 p.m.	Toledo	Waldo Stadium; Kalamazoo, MI		L 21–42	9,844	
November 23		at Central Michigan	Kelly/Shorts Stadium; Mount Pleasant, MI (rivalry)		W 35–10	19,862	
*Non-conference game; Rankings from AP Poll released prior to the game; All times are in Eastern time

== Roster ==
2002 Western Michigan Broncos football team roster
Players
Coaches
Offense

Pos.	#	Name	Class
WR	15	Greg Jennings	Fr
TE	85	Tony Scheffler	Fr

Defense

Pos.	#	Name	Class

Special teams

Pos.	#	Name	Class

Head coach

- Gary Darnell

Coordinators/assistant coaches

- Dan Enos (Quarterbacks)

Legend

- (C) Team captain
- (S) Suspended
- (I) Ineligible
- Injured
- Redshirt
