= 2002 Miami RedHawks football team =

American college football season

2002 Miami RedHawks football
- Conference: Mid-American Conference
- East Division
- Record: 7–5 (5–3 MAC)
- Head coach: Terry Hoeppner (3rd season)
- Offensive coordinator: Shane Montgomery (2nd season)
- Offensive scheme: Multiple
- Defensive coordinator: Jon Wauford (3rd season)
- Base defense: 4–3
- Home stadium: Yager Stadium

2002 Mid-American Conference football standings
	Conf.			Overall
Team	W		L	W		L
East Division
No. 24 Marshall x$	7	–	1	11	–	2
UCF	6	–	2	7	–	5
Miami (OH)	5	–	3	7	–	5
Ohio	4	–	4	4	–	8
Akron	3	–	5	4	–	8
Kent State	1	–	7	3	–	9
Buffalo	0	–	8	1	–	11
West Division
Toledo xy	7	–	1	9	–	5
Northern Illinois x	7	–	1	8	–	4
Bowling Green	6	–	2	9	–	3
Ball State	4	–	4	6	–	6
Western Michigan	3	–	5	4	–	8
Central Michigan	2	–	6	4	–	8
Eastern Michigan	1	–	7	3	–	9
Championship: Marshall 49, Toledo 45
$ – Conference champion; x – Division champion/co-champions; Rankings from AP Poll

The 2002 Miami RedHawks football team represented the Miami University in the 2002 NCAA Division I-A football season. They played their home games at Yager Stadium in Oxford, Ohio and competed as members of the Mid-American Conference. The team was coached by head coach Terry Hoeppner. Despite finishing 7-5, the RedHawks did not receive a bowl bid.

== Schedule ==
Date	Time	Opponent	Site	TV	Result	Attendance
August 31	1:30 pm	at North Carolina*	Kenan Memorial Stadium; Chapel Hill, NC		W 27–21	38,000
September 7	12:00 pm	Iowa*	Yager Stadium; Oxford, OH	ESPN Plus	L 24–29	25,934
September 14	8:00 pm	at No. 25 LSU*	Tiger Stadium; Baton Rouge, LA		L 7–33	90,010
September 21	2:00 pm	Kent State	Yager Stadium; Oxford, OH		W 27–20	15,042
September 28	6:00 pm	at Akron	Rubber Bowl; Akron, OH		W 48–31	17,298
October 5	1:00 pm	at Cincinnati*	Nippert Stadium; Cincinnati, OH (Victory Bell)		W 31–26	31,478
October 12	2:00 pm	Northern Illinois	Yager Stadium; Oxford, OH		L 41–48	15,234
October 19	1:00 pm	at Buffalo	University at Buffalo Stadium; Amherst, NY		W 49–0	9,213
October 26	7:00 pm	at Toledo	Glass Bowl; Toledo, OH		W 27–13	24,466
November 2	1:00 pm	Ohio	Yager Stadium; Oxford, OH (Battle of the Bricks)	ONN	W 38–20	27,253
November 12	8:00 pm	at Marshall	Marshall University Stadium; Huntington, WV	ESPN	L 34–36	26,851
November 23	2:00 pm	Central Florida	Yager Stadium; Oxford, OH		L 31–48	7,962
*Non-conference game; Rankings from AP Poll released prior to the game; All times are in Eastern time

== Roster ==
2002 Miami RedHawks football team roster
Players
Coaches
Offense

Pos.	#	Name	Class
WR	4	Eddie Tillitz	Sr
WR	5	Andre Henderson	Fr
WR	6	Michael Larkin	So
QB	7	Ben Roethlisberger	So
QB	8	Josh Betts	Fr
OL	60	Dan Kosta	Jr
OL	61	Dave Rehker	So
OL	62	Todd Londot	Fr
OL	63	Justin Smith	Sr
OL	64	Ben Hartings	So
OL	66	Joe Serina	Jr
OL	70	Ryan Meyer	Fr
OL	71	Ben Herrell	Jr
OL	74	Jacob Bell	Jr
OL	75	Mark Kracium	Fr
OL	76	Chris Fessel	Fr
OL	78	Kenneth Getch	Fr
OL	79	Nate Bunce	Fr
WR	80	Jason Branch	Sr
WR	81	Randy Stegman	Sr
WR	82	R. J. Corbin	Fr
WR	83	Calvin Blackmon	So
TE	84	Tyler Vogel	Fr
TE	87	Matt Brandt	Jr
WR	88	Korey Kirkpatrick	Jr
TE	89	Dan Tyler	Fr
TE	90	Geoff Robinson	Jr

Defense

Pos.	#	Name	Class
DL	47	Jeremy Thompson	So
DL	48	Bill Lautar	Fr
DL	49	Will Stanley	Jr
DL	50	Matt Edwards	Sr
DL	65	John Glavin	Fr

Special teams

Pos.	#	Name	Class

Head coach

- Terry Hoeppner

Coordinators/assistant coaches

Legend

- (C) Team captain
- (S) Suspended
- (I) Ineligible
- Injured
- Redshirt

Roster
Last update: 2003-04-04
