= 2002 Eastern Michigan Eagles football team =

American college football season

2002 Eastern Michigan Eagles football
- Conference: Mid-American Conference
- West Division
- Record: 3–9 (1–7 MAC)
- Head coach: Jeff Woodruff (3rd season)
- Offensive coordinator: Pete Alamar (3rd season)
- MVPs: Troy Edwards (offense); David Lusky (defense)
- Captains: Jari Brown; David Lusky; Kevin Walter; Kevin Zureki
- Home stadium: Rynearson Stadium

2002 Mid-American Conference football standings
	Conf.			Overall
Team	W		L	W		L
East Division
No. 24 Marshall x$	7	–	1	11	–	2
UCF	6	–	2	7	–	5
Miami (OH)	5	–	3	7	–	5
Ohio	4	–	4	4	–	8
Akron	3	–	5	4	–	8
Kent State	1	–	7	3	–	9
Buffalo	0	–	8	1	–	11
West Division
Toledo xy	7	–	1	9	–	5
Northern Illinois x	7	–	1	8	–	4
Bowling Green	6	–	2	9	–	3
Ball State	4	–	4	6	–	6
Western Michigan	3	–	5	4	–	8
Central Michigan	2	–	6	4	–	8
Eastern Michigan	1	–	7	3	–	9
Championship: Marshall 49, Toledo 45
$ – Conference champion; x – Division champion/co-champions; Rankings from AP Poll

The 2002 Eastern Michigan Eagles football team represented Eastern Michigan University in the 2002 NCAA Division I-A football season. In their third season under head coach Jeff Woodruff, the Eagles compiled a 3–9 record (1–7 against conference opponents), finished in last place in the West Division of the Mid-American Conference, and were outscored by their opponents 566 to 286. The team's statistical leaders included Troy Edwards with 2,762 passing yards, Ime Akpan with 1,221 rushing yards, and Kevin Walter with 1,368 receiving yards.

== Schedule ==
Date	Time	Opponent	Site	TV	Result	Attendance
August 31	3:30	at No. 18 Michigan State*	Spartan Stadium; East Lansing, MI	ESPN+	L 7-56	73,927
September 7	6:00	Toledo	Rynearson Stadium; Ypsilanti, MI		L 13-65	16,843
September 14	6:00	Southeast Missouri State*	Rynearson Stadium; Ypsilanti, MI		W 35-32	9,581
September 21	6:08	at Maryland*	Byrd Stadium; College Park, MD		L 3-45	46,098
September 28	6:05	Southern Illinois*	Rynearson Stadium; Ypsilanti, MI		W 48-45 ^{2OT}	15,221
October 5	6:05	Akron	Rynearson Stadium; Ypsilanti, MI		W 42-34	10,075
October 12	2:03	at Ohio	Peden Stadium; Athens, OH		L 27-55	19,155
October 19	1:30	at Ball State	Scheumann Stadium; Muncie, IN		L 17-42	15,975
November 2	1:00	Central Michigan	Rynearson Stadium; Ypsilanti, MI (rivalry)		L 21-47	7,370
November 9	1:00	at Western Michigan	Waldo Stadium; Kalamazoo, MI		L 31-33	11,381
November 16	1:00	Northern Illinois	Rynearson Stadium; Ypsilanti, MI		L 21-49	5,569
November 23	6:00	Bowling Green	Doyt Perry Stadium; Bowling Green, OH		L 21-63	12,974
*Non-conference game; Rankings from AP Poll released prior to the game; All times are in Eastern time

== Roster ==
2002 Eastern Michigan Eagles football team roster
Players
Coaches
Offense

Pos.	#	Name	Class
WR	1	Kevin Walter	Sr
WR	5	Chris Talley	So
WR	6	Chris Roberson	So
WR	7	LaGarian Houston	Fr
QB	8	Jeff Crooks	Jr
TE	82	Kevin Zureki	Jr
WR	83	Erik Ibom	Sr

Defense

Pos.	#	Name	Class
DB	14	Jereme Perry	So
DB	39	Corey Edwards	So
DB	41	Marcus Crosby	So
LB	42	Chris Whittington	Sr
LB	43	Mark Zambrano	Fr
LB	44	Martez Ivery	Fr
LB, FB	45	Steven Bednarik	Fr
LB	46	Jeff Wolf	Fr
LB	37	Mike Salvatori	Jr

Special teams

Pos.	#	Name	Class
LS/C	87	Carson Dach	So

Head coach

- Jeff Woodruff

Coordinators/assistant coaches

- Pete Alamar

Legend

- (C) Team captain
- (S) Suspended
- (I) Ineligible
- Injured
- Redshirt

== After the season ==
The following Eagle was selected in the 2003 NFL draft after the season.

Round	Pick	Player	Position	NFL club
7	255	Kevin Walter	Wide receiver	New York Giants
