= 2002 North Carolina Tar Heels football team =

American college football season

2002 North Carolina Tar Heels football
- Conference: Atlantic Coast Conference
- Record: 3–9 (1–7 ACC)
- Head coach: John Bunting (2nd season)
- Offensive coordinator: Gary Tranquill (2nd season)
- Offensive scheme: Pro-style
- Defensive coordinator: Dave Huxtable (1st season)
- Base defense: 4–3
- Captains: Sam Aiken; Dexter Reid; Ronald Brewer
- Home stadium: Kenan Memorial Stadium

2002 Atlantic Coast Conference football standings
	Conf.			Overall
Team	W		L	W		L
No. 21 Florida State $	7	–	1	9	–	5
No. 22 Virginia	6	–	2	9	–	5
No. 13 Maryland	6	–	2	11	–	3
No. 12 NC State	5	–	3	11	–	3
Clemson	4	–	4	7	–	6
Georgia Tech	4	–	4	7	–	6
Wake Forest	3	–	5	7	–	6
North Carolina	1	–	7	3	–	9
Duke	0	–	8	2	–	10
$ – BCS representative as conference champion; Rankings from AP Poll

The 2002 North Carolina Tar Heels football team represented the University of North Carolina at Chapel Hill as a member of the Atlantic Coast Conference (ACC) during the 2002 NCAA Division I-A football season. Led by second-year head coach John Bunting, the Tar Heels played their home games at Kenan Memorial Stadium in Chapel Hill, North Carolina. North Carolina finished the season 3–9 overall and 1–7 in ACC play to place eighth.

== Schedule ==
Date	Time	Opponent	Site	TV	Result	Attendance
August 31	1:30 p.m.	Miami (OH)*	Kenan Memorial Stadium; Chapel Hill, NC		L 21–27	38,000
September 7	8:00 p.m.	at Syracuse*	Carrier Dome; Syracuse, NY	ESPN2	W 30–22	39,444
September 14	8:00 p.m.	No. 3 Texas*	Kenan Memorial Stadium; Chapel Hill, NC	ABC	L 21–52	60,500
September 28	3:30 p.m.	Georgia Tech	Kenan Memorial Stadium; Chapel Hill, NC	ABC	L 13–21	57,000
October 5	10:00 p.m.	at Arizona State*	Sun Devil Stadium; Tempe, AZ		W 38–35	42,128
October 12	12:00 p.m.	No. 14 NC State	Kenan Memorial Stadium; Chapel Hill, NC (rivalry)	JPS	L 17–34	60,250
October 19	12:00 p.m.	at Virginia	Scott Stadium; Charlottesville, VA (South's Oldest Rivalry)	JPS	L 27–37	55,648
October 26	12:00 p.m.	at Wake Forest	Groves Stadium; Winston-Salem, NC (rivalry)	JPS	L 0–31	31,476
November 2	1:30 p.m.	Maryland^{†}	Kenan Memorial Stadium; Chapel Hill, NC		L 7–59	44,000
November 9	12:00 p.m.	Clemson	Kenan Memorial Stadium; Chapel Hill, NC	JPS	L 12–42	42,000
November 16	3:30 p.m.	at No. 15 Florida State	Doak Campbell Stadium; Tallahassee, FL	ABC	L 14–40	81,190
November 23	12:00 p.m.	at Duke	Wallace Wade Stadium; Durham, NC (Victory Bell)	JPS	W 23–21	33,002
*Non-conference game; ^{†}Homecoming; Rankings from AP Poll released prior to the game; All times are in Eastern time

== Roster ==
2002 North Carolina Tar Heels football team roster
Players
Coaches
Offense

Pos.	#	Name	Class
WR	88	Sam Aiken	Sr
QB	17	Matt Baker	Fr
C	72	Jason Brown	So
QB	4	Darian Durant	So
FB	44	Madison Hedgecock	So
TE	86	Zach Hilton	Sr
RB	15	Willie Parker	Jr
OT	77	Jeb Terry	Jr

Defense

Pos.	#	Name	Class
FS	24	Dexter Reid	Jr
TB	6	Chad Scott	So
CB	18	Michael Waddell	Jr

Special teams

Pos.	#	Name	Class
LS	56	Greg Warren	So

Head coach

- John Bunting

Coordinators/assistant coaches

- Rod Broadway
  Defensive line

Legend

- (C) Team captain
- (S) Suspended
- (I) Ineligible
- Injured
- Redshirt

Roster

== Coaching staff ==
Name	Position	Seasons in Position
John Bunting	Head coach	2nd
Gunter Brewer	Wide Receivers	3rd
Rod Broadway	Defensive tackles	2nd
Ken Browning	Tight Ends / recruiting coordinator	9th
Jeff Connors	Strength and conditioning coordinator	2nd
Jim Fleming	Defensive Backs / special teams coordinator	1st
Hal Hunter	Offensive Line	1st
Dave Huxtable	Defensive coordinator / Linebackers	2nd
Andre' Powell	Running backs	2nd
Gary Tranquill	Offensive coordinator / quarterbacks	2nd
James Webster, Jr.	Defensive ends	2nd
