= 2002 Clemson Tigers football team =

American college football season

2002 Clemson Tigers football

Tangerine Bowl, L 15–55 vs. Texas Tech
- Conference: Atlantic Coast Conference
- Record: 7–6 (4–4 ACC)
- Head coach: Tommy Bowden (4th season)
- Offensive coordinator: Brad Scott (2nd season)
- Offensive scheme: Pro set
- Defensive coordinator: John Lovett (1st season)
- Base defense: 4–3
- Captains: Nick Eason; Bryant McNeal; Jackie Robinson
- Home stadium: Memorial Stadium

2002 Atlantic Coast Conference football standings
	Conf.			Overall
Team	W		L	W		L
No. 21 Florida State $	7	–	1	9	–	5
No. 22 Virginia	6	–	2	9	–	5
No. 13 Maryland	6	–	2	11	–	3
No. 12 NC State	5	–	3	11	–	3
Clemson	4	–	4	7	–	6
Georgia Tech	4	–	4	7	–	6
Wake Forest	3	–	5	7	–	6
North Carolina	1	–	7	3	–	9
Duke	0	–	8	2	–	10
$ – BCS representative as conference champion; Rankings from AP Poll

The 2002 Clemson Tigers football team represented Clemson University as a member of the Atlantic Coast Conference (ACC) during the 2002 NCAA Division I-A football season. Led by fourth-year head coach Tommy Bowden, the Tigers compiled an overall record of 7–6 with a mark of 4–4 in conference play, tying for fifth place in the ACC. Clemson was invited to the Tangerine Bowl, where the Tigers lost to Texas Tech. The team played home games at Memorial Stadium in Clemson, South Carolina.

Clemson's game against South Carolina to close out the regular season was the 100th game football played in the Clemson–South Carolina rivalry.

== Schedule ==
Date	Time	Opponent	Site	TV	Result	Attendance	Source
August 31	7:45 p.m.	at No. 8 Georgia*	Sanford Stadium; Athens, GA (rivalry)	ESPN	L 28–31	86,520	
September 7	1:00 p.m.	Louisiana Tech*	Memorial Stadium; Clemson, SC		W 33–13	72,616	
September 14	12:00 p.m.	Georgia Tech	Memorial Stadium; Clemson, SC (rivalry)	ESPN	W 24–19	77,586	
September 21	1:00 p.m.	Ball State*	Memorial Stadium; Clemson, SC		W 30–7	73,945	
October 3	7:45 p.m.	at No. 11 Florida State	Doak Campbell Stadium; Tallahassee, FL (rivalry)	ESPN	L 31–48	78,841	
October 12	12:00 p.m.	at Virginia	Scott Stadium; Charlottesville, VA	ESPN2	L 17–22	54,114	
October 19	3:30 p.m.	Wake Forest	Memorial Stadium; Clemson, SC	ABC	W 31–23	81,008	
October 24	7:45 p.m.	No. 12 NC State	Memorial Stadium; Clemson, SC (Textile Bowl)	ESPN	L 6–38	78,904	
November 2	12:00 p.m.	at Duke	Wallace Wade Stadium; Durham, NC	JPS	W 34–31	16,479	
November 9	12:00 p.m.	at North Carolina	Kenan Memorial Stadium; Chapel Hill, NC	JPS	W 42–12	42,000	
November 16	7:45 p.m.	No. 19 Maryland	Memorial Stadium; Clemson, SC	ESPN2	L 12–30	74,707	
November 23	7:45 p.m.	South Carolina*	Memorial Stadium; Clemson, SC (rivalry)	ESPN	W 27–20	83,909	
December 23	5:30 p.m.	vs. Texas Tech*	Florida Citrus Bowl; Orlando, FL (Tangerine Bowl)	ESPN	L 15–55	21,689	
*Non-conference game; Rankings from AP Poll released prior to the game; All times are in Eastern time

== Roster ==
2002 Clemson Tigers football team roster
Players
Coaches
Offense

Pos.	#	Name	Class
QB	6	Charlie Whitehurst	Fr
WR	17	Kevin Youngblood	Jr
OT	77	Brad Lee	Fr
WR	83	Tony Elliott	Sr
WR	84	J. J. McKelvey	Sr
WR	85	Ronnie Thomas	Jr

Defense

Pos.	#	Name	Class
LB	45	John Leake	Jr
DT	98	Nick Eason	Sr

Special teams

Pos.	#	Name	Class

Head coach

- Tommy Bowden

Coordinators/assistant coaches

Legend

- (C) Team captain
- (S) Suspended
- (I) Ineligible
- Injured
- Redshirt

Roster
Last update: 2002-12-05
