= 2002 Connecticut Huskies football team =

American college football season

2002 Connecticut Huskies football
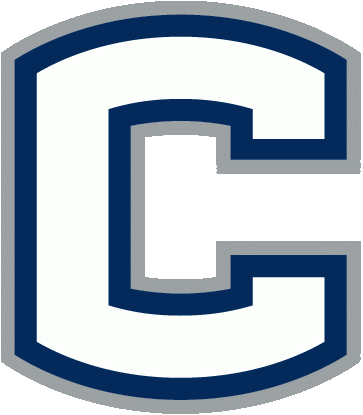
- Conference: Independent
- Record: 6–6
- Head coach: Randy Edsall (4th season)
- Offensive coordinator: Norries Wilson (1st season)
- Offensive scheme: Multiple
- Defensive coordinator: Hank Hughes (1st season)
- Base defense: 4–3
- Home stadium: Memorial Stadium

2002 NCAA Division I-A independents football records
	Conf.			Overall
Team	W		L	W		L
South Florida		–		9	–	2
No. 17 Notre Dame		–		10	–	3
Connecticut		–		6	–	6
Utah State		–		4	–	7
Troy State		–		4	–	8
Navy		–		2	–	10
Rankings from AP Poll

The 2002 Connecticut Huskies football team represented the University of Connecticut as an independent during the 2002 NCAA Division I-A football season. Led by fourth-year head coach Randy Edsall, the Huskies compiled a record of 6–6. This was the program's first season as a full-time member at the NCAA Division I-A level, having moved from NCAA Division I-AA after the 1999 season, and spending two seasons as a transitional team. The team played home games at Memorial Stadium in Storrs, Connecticut for the last year, as the Huskies moved to Rentschler Field the following season.

Despite winning only two of their first eight games, Connecticut finished with a .500 record. Although not selected for a bowl game, the Huskies were bowl eligible for the first time. The turning point in the season came after a hard-fought loss at Vanderbilt. Led by freshman running back Terry Caulley and sophomore quarterback Dan Orlovsky, the Huskies won their final four games on the schedule, outscoring opponents 199 to 55. The winning streak began with the final two games played at Memorial Stadium. The Huskies closed the stadium with their two highest point totals in the stadium's history: 61 against Florida Atlantic and 63 against Kent State. Connecticut finished the season with the program's first ever victory over a bowl-bound opponent by defeating Iowa State, 37–20, in Ames, Iowa.

Caulley was a consensus Freshman All-American, leading all freshman in rushing with 1,247 yards. Despite sitting out two games with injuries, Caulley's rushing total was only 15 yards short of the team's single season record.

== Schedule ==
Date	Time	Opponent	Site	TV	Result	Attendance
August 31	12:00 pm	at Boston College	Alumni Stadium; Chestnut Hill, MA	ESPN Plus	L 16–24	40,066
September 7	12:00 pm	Georgia Tech	Memorial Stadium; Storrs, CT	FSN	L 14–31	16,751
September 14	7:30 pm	at Buffalo	University at Buffalo Stadium; Amherst, NY		W 24–3	17,012
September 21	12:00 pm	Ohio	Memorial Stadium; Storrs, CT		W 37–19	15,901
September 28	1:00 pm	Ball State	Memorial Stadium; Storrs, CT		L 21–24 ^{OT}	16,849
October 5	7:00 pm	at No. 1 Miami (FL)	Miami Orange Bowl; Miami, FL		L 14–48	52,131
October 19	12:00 pm	Temple	Memorial Stadium; Storrs, CT		L 24–38	15,723
October 26	2:00 pm	at Vanderbilt	Vanderbilt Stadium; Nashville, TN		L 24–28	21,210
November 2	12:00 pm	Florida Atlantic	Memorial Stadium; Storrs, CT		W 61–14	14,287
November 9	12:00 pm	Kent State	Memorial Stadium; Storrs, CT		W 63–21	15,332
November 16	12:00 pm	at Navy	Navy–Marine Corps Memorial Stadium; Annapolis, MD		W 38–0	25,664
November 23	2:00 pm	at Iowa State	Jack Trice Stadium; Ames, IA		W 37–20	34,582
Rankings from AP Poll released prior to the game; All times are in Eastern time
