= 2002 NCAA Division I-A football season =

American college football season

2002 NCAA Division I-A season
- Heisman Trophy awarded to Carson Palmer
- Number of teams: 117
- Preseason AP No. 1: Miami (FL)

Postseason
- Duration: December 17, 2002 – January 3, 2003
- Bowl games: 28
- Heisman Trophy: USC quarterback Carson Palmer

Bowl Championship Series
- 2003 Fiesta Bowl
- Site: Sun Devil Stadium, Tempe, Arizona
- Champion(s): Ohio State

Division I-A football seasons
- ← 2001 2003 →

The 2002 NCAA Division I-A football season ended with a double overtime national championship game. Ohio State and Miami (FL) both came into the Fiesta Bowl undefeated. The underdog Buckeyes defeated the defending-champion Hurricanes 31–24, ending Miami's 34-game winning streak. Jim Tressel won the national championship in only his second year as head coach.

Rose Bowl officials were vocally upset over the loss of the Big Ten champ from the game. Former New England Patriots coach Pete Carroll returned the USC Trojans to a BCS bid in only his second season as head coach. Notre Dame also returned to prominence, as Tyrone Willingham became the first coach in Notre Dame history to win 10 games in his first season.

== Rules changes ==
The NCAA Rules Committee adopted the following rules changes for the 2002 season:

- The penalty for violating the so-called "Halo Rule" (two yard restricted area around the punt/kick receiver) without making contact with the receiver is increased from five yards to 10 yards.
- Flagrant personal fouls committed during possession by the defense in overtime will be carried over to the next extra period. Previously, those fouls were disregarded but the player committing the foul was ejected from the game.
- All players are required to wear facemasks of the same color.
- Penalties committed during a touchdown play can now either be enforced on the PAT or the ensuing kickoff.

== Conference and program changes ==
No teams upgraded from Division I-AA, leaving the number of Division I-A schools fixed at 117.

- The only conference move during this season saw the University of Central Florida leave the Independent ranks to join the Mid-American Conference as its 14th member.

| School | 2001 Conference | 2002 Conference |
|---|---|---|
| Central Florida Knights | I-A Independent | MAC |

== Regular season ==
=== August-September ===
Coming off a national championship season and riding a 22-game winning streak, Miami was ranked No. 1 in the preseason AP Poll. The Hurricanes were followed by No. 2 Oklahoma, No. 3 Florida State, No. 4 Texas, and No. 5 Tennessee.

August 24: The only top-five team to play this week was No. 3 Florida State, who needed a game-ending goal-line stand to stop Iowa State 38-31 in the Eddie Robinson Classic. The Seminoles dropped in the next AP Poll, which featured Miami and Oklahoma tied at No. 1, followed by No. 3 Texas, No. 4 Tennessee, and No. 5 Florida State.

August 30-31: No. 1 Miami defeated Florida A&M 63-17, fellow No. 1 Oklahoma shut out Tulsa 37-0, No. 3 Texas blanked North Texas 27-0, No. 4 Tennessee beat Wyoming 47-7, and No. 5 Florida State won 40-19 over Virginia. Miami regained sole possession of the No. 1 spot in the next poll, with the top five otherwise remaining the same.

September 7: No. 1 Miami faced a tough early-season test against No. 6 Florida, and the Hurricanes passed with flying colors in a 41-16 victory. No. 2 Oklahoma beat Alabama 37-27, but lost quarterback Jason White to a season-ending ACL tear. No. 3 Texas was idle. No. 4 Tennessee defeated Middle Tennessee State 26-3. No. 5 Florida State was also idle, and the top five remained the same.

September 14: No. 1 Miami won 44-21 at Temple. With Nate Hybl taking over at quarterback, No. 2 Oklahoma blanked UTEP 68-0. No. 3 Texas visited North Carolina for a 52-21 victory. No. 4 Tennessee was idle, and No. 5 Florida State was a 37-10 winner at Maryland. The top five again remained the same.

September 21: No. 1 Miami beat Boston College 38-6. No. 2 Oklahoma was idle. No. 3 Texas defeated Houston 41-11, but No. 4 Tennessee fell 30-13 to No. 10 Florida at home. No. 5 Florida State defeated Duke 48-17, and No. 7 Virginia Tech won 13-3 at No. 19 Texas A&M. The next poll featured No. 1 Miami, No. 2 Oklahoma, No. 3 Texas, No. 4 Florida State, and No. 5 Virginia Tech.

September 28: No. 1 Miami was idle. No. 2 Oklahoma beat South Florida 31-14, but the AP voters were more impressed by No. 3 Texas’s 49-0 shutout of Tulane. No. 4 Florida State played Louisville in a driving rainstorm and suffered a 26-20 overtime loss. No. 5 Virginia Tech blanked Western Michigan 30-0, and No. 6 Ohio State won 45-17 over Indiana. The next poll featured No. 1 Miami, No. 2 Texas, No. 3 Oklahoma, No. 4 Virginia Tech, and No. 5 Ohio State.

=== October ===
October 5: No. 1 Miami defeated Connecticut 48-14. No. 2 Texas missed three short field goals and only escaped Oklahoma State 17-15 when the Cowboys failed to convert a two-point play after a fourth-quarter touchdown. No. 3 Oklahoma had a close call of their own, trailing Missouri in the fourth quarter before throwing a touchdown pass on a fake field goal and winning 31-24. No. 4 Virginia Tech was idle, and No. 5 Ohio State beat Northwestern 27-16. The Longhorns and Sooners switched places again in the next poll: No. 1 Miami, No. 2 Oklahoma, No. 3 Texas, No. 4 Virginia Tech, and No. 5 Ohio State.

October 10-12: In 1991, 1992, and 2000, Florida State had lost their rivalry game with Miami on potential game-winning or tying kicks which went wide right. This year brought more heartbreak as No. 9 FSU blew a 13-point fourth quarter lead to the top-ranked Hurricanes. Trailing 28-27, Florida State had one more chance at a field goal to win, but this time the kick sailed wide left and Miami escaped with the victory. Another rivalry showdown took place in Dallas, where No. 2 Oklahoma prevailed 35-24 over No. 3 Texas. No. 4 Virginia Tech won 28-23 at Boston College, No. 5 Ohio State blasted San Jose State 50-7, and No. 6 Georgia got past No. 10 Tennessee 18-13. The next poll featured No. 1 Miami, No. 2 Oklahoma, No. 3 Virginia Tech, No. 4 Ohio State, and No. 5 Georgia.

October 19: No. 1 Miami was idle, No. 2 Oklahoma blew out No. 9 Iowa State 49-3, and No. 3 Virginia Tech defeated Rutgers 35-14. No. 4 Ohio State needed a fourth-quarter comeback to beat Wisconsin 19-14, while No. 5 Georgia beat Vanderbilt 48-17. The AP poll remained the same, but the first BCS standings were also released this week and had a somewhat different order. Oklahoma was in first place after two impressive victories in a row, followed by Miami, AP No. 6 Notre Dame, Virginia Tech, and Georgia.

October 26: No. 1 Miami won 40-23 at West Virginia. No. 2 Oklahoma was idle. No. 3 Virginia Tech defeated Temple 20-10. No. 4 Ohio State again looked mortal in a 13-7 victory over No. 18 Penn State. No. 5 Georgia beat Kentucky 52-24 on the road. No. 6 Notre Dame’s 34-24 win at No. 11 Florida State was enough to move the Irish up in the next poll: No. 1 Miami, No. 2 Oklahoma, No. 3 Virginia Tech, No. 4 Notre Dame, and No. 5 Georgia. Despite falling to sixth in the AP standings, Ohio State moved up in the BCS, where they replaced Virginia Tech in the top five.

=== November ===
November 2: No. 1 Miami won 42-17 at Rutgers, but No. 2 Oklahoma—already first in the BCS standings—pulled off their third consecutive victory over a ranked opponent (27-11 against No. 13 Colorado) and took over the top spot in the next AP Poll. There was plenty of chaos among the other highly ranked teams. No. 3 Virginia Tech blew a two-touchdown lead and lost 28-21 to Pittsburgh, No. 4 Notre Dame fell 14-7 to Boston College, and No. 5 Georgia was defeated 20-13 by Florida, the Gators’ twelfth win over the Bulldogs in thirteen years. No. 6 Ohio State blew out No. 23 Minnesota 34-3, No. 7 Texas beat Nebraska 27-24 with the help of a late interception, and No. 8 Washington State defeated No. 16 Arizona State 44-22. The next AP Poll featured No. 1 Oklahoma, No. 2 Miami, No. 3 Ohio State, No. 4 Texas, and No. 5 Washington State. Miami held onto first place in the Coaches Poll but dropped even further in the BCS, falling to third behind Oklahoma and Ohio State.

November 9: Playing their first unranked opponent in over a month, No. 1 Oklahoma lost 30-26 at Texas A&M, while No. 2 Miami moved back up with a 26-3 victory at Tennessee. No. 3 Ohio State escaped Purdue 10-6 on Craig Krenzel’s fourth-down touchdown pass with two minutes left. No. 4 Texas shut out Baylor 41-0, and No. 5 Washington State won 32-21 over No. 15 Oregon. The next AP Poll featured No. 1 Miami, No. 2 Ohio State, and No. 3 Washington State, with Oklahoma and Texas tied at No. 4. Ohio State took over first place in the BCS standings.

November 16: No. 1 Miami was idle. No. 2 Ohio State had their fourth close call in five weeks, needing overtime to get past Illinois 23-16. No. 3 Washington State was also idle. No. 4 Oklahoma rebounded with a 49-9 blowout of Baylor, but fellow No. 4 Texas fell 42-38 at Texas Tech. No. 6 Iowa moved up with a 45-21 win at Minnesota: No. 1 Miami, No. 2 Ohio State, No. 3 Washington State, No. 4 Oklahoma, and No. 5 Iowa. The BCS had Miami back in first place and Georgia, the sixth-ranked team in the AP Poll, at No. 5.

November 21-23: No. 1 Miami held off No. 17 Pittsburgh 28-21. After several close victories throughout the year, No. 2 Ohio State faced their final test against No. 12 Michigan, who had spoiled several potential undefeated seasons for the Buckeyes in the past decade. This time, OSU came through with a 14-9 victory to finish with a perfect record. No. 3 Washington State was less successful in their rivalry game, blowing a ten-point lead with four minutes to play and losing 29-26 to Washington in triple overtime. No. 4 Oklahoma clinched a spot in the Big 12 championship game with a 60-15 blowout of No. 24 Texas Tech. No. 5 Iowa had finished their schedule. No. 6 Georgia, who had already earned the SEC East title, was idle but moved up in the next AP Poll: No. 1 Miami, No. 2 Ohio State, No. 3 Oklahoma, No. 4 Iowa, and No. 5 Georgia.

November 30: No. 1 Miami clinched the Big East title with an easy 49-7 win at Syracuse. No. 2 Ohio State and No. 4 Iowa had finished their schedules. For the second year in a row, No. 3 Oklahoma suffered an upset loss to rival Oklahoma State; the Sooners trailed by as many as 29 points and eventually fell 38-28. No. 5 Georgia overwhelmed Georgia Tech 51-7. No. 6 USC breezed past No. 7 Notre Dame 44-13. The next AP Poll featured No. 1 Miami, No. 2 Ohio State, No. 3 Iowa, No. 4 Georgia, and No. 5 USC.

=== December ===
December 7: No. 1 Miami completed their second consecutive undefeated regular season and ran their overall winning streak to 34 games with a 56-45 victory over No. 18 Virginia Tech. No. 14 Alabama had won the SEC West, but the Crimson Tide were ineligible for postseason play due to NCAA violations, so No. 22 Arkansas represented the division against No. 4 Georgia in the SEC Championship Game. The matchup was no contest, with the Bulldogs winning 30-3. No. 2 Ohio State, No. 3 Iowa, and No. 5 USC had all finished their schedules, and the AP Poll remained unchanged.

As the only two undefeated teams in the nation, No. 1 Miami and No. 2 Ohio State were a shoo-in for the national championship game in the Fiesta Bowl. No. 3 Iowa had tied with the Buckeyes for the Big Ten title (the two teams did not play each other, allowing them both to finish unbeaten in conference play), but the Hawkeyes ended up playing No. 5 USC in the Orange Bowl rather than the conference’s usual spot in the Rose Bowl. The Rose matchup was No. 8 Oklahoma from the Big 12 against No. 7 Washington State, who tied USC atop the Pac-10 and held the head-to-head tiebreaker. Finally, the Sugar Bowl pitted No. 4 Georgia against the ACC champion, No. 16 Florida State.

== Regular season top 10 matchups ==
Rankings reflect the AP Poll. Rankings for Week 9 and beyond will list BCS Rankings first and AP Poll second. Teams that failed to be a top 10 team for one poll or the other will be noted.

- Week 2
  - No. 1 Miami defeated No. 6 Florida, 41–16 (Ben Hill Griffin Stadium, Gainesville, Florida)
- Week 3
  - No. 6 Ohio State defeated No. 10 Washington State, 25–7 (Ohio Stadium, Columbus, Ohio)
- Week 4
  - No. 10 Florida defeated No. 4 Tennessee, 30–13 (Neyland Stadium, Knoxville, Tennessee)
- Week 7
  - No. 1 Miami defeated No. 9 Florida State, 28–27 (Miami Orange Bowl, Miami, Florida)
  - No. 2 Oklahoma defeated No. 3 Texas, 35–24 (Cotton Bowl, Dallas, Texas)
  - No. 6 Georgia defeated No. 10 Tennessee, 18–13 (Sanford Stadium, Athens, Georgia)
- Week 8
  - No. 2 Oklahoma defeated No. 9 Iowa State, 49–3 (Oklahoma Memorial Stadium, Norman, Oklahoma)
- Week 13
  - No. 2/2 Ohio State defeated No. 9/12 Michigan, 14–9 (Ohio Stadium, Columbus, Ohio)
- Week 14
  - No. 6/6 USC defeated No. 7/7 Notre Dame, 44–13 (Los Angeles Memorial Coliseum, Los Angeles, California)

== Conference standings ==
2002 Atlantic Coast Conference football standings
| | Conf. | | | Overall |
| Team | W | | L | W | | L |
|---|---|---|---|---|---|---|
| No. 21 Florida State $ | 7 | – | 1 | 9 | – | 5 |
| No. 22 Virginia | 6 | – | 2 | 9 | – | 5 |
| No. 13 Maryland | 6 | – | 2 | 11 | – | 3 |
| No. 12 NC State | 5 | – | 3 | 11 | – | 3 |
| Clemson | 4 | – | 4 | 7 | – | 6 |
| Georgia Tech | 4 | – | 4 | 7 | – | 6 |
| Wake Forest | 3 | – | 5 | 7 | – | 6 |
| North Carolina | 1 | – | 7 | 3 | – | 9 |
| Duke | 0 | – | 8 | 2 | – | 10 |
$ – BCS representative as conference champion; Rankings from AP Poll

2002 Big 12 Conference football standings
| | Conf. | | | Overall |
| Team | W | | L | W | | L |
|---|---|---|---|---|---|---|
North Division
| No. 20 Colorado xy | 7 | – | 1 | 9 | – | 5 |
| No. 7 Kansas State | 6 | – | 2 | 11 | – | 2 |
| Iowa State | 4 | – | 4 | 7 | – | 7 |
| Nebraska | 3 | – | 5 | 7 | – | 7 |
| Missouri | 2 | – | 6 | 5 | – | 7 |
| Kansas | 0 | – | 8 | 2 | – | 10 |
South Division
| No. 5 Oklahoma xy$ | 6 | – | 2 | 12 | – | 2 |
| No. 6 Texas x | 6 | – | 2 | 11 | – | 2 |
| Texas Tech | 5 | – | 3 | 9 | – | 5 |
| Oklahoma State | 5 | – | 3 | 8 | – | 5 |
| Texas A&M | 3 | – | 5 | 6 | – | 6 |
| Baylor | 1 | – | 7 | 3 | – | 9 |
Championship: Oklahoma 29, Colorado 7
$ – BCS representative as conference champion; x – Division champion/co-champions; y – Championship game participant; Rankings from AP Poll

2002 Big East Conference football standings
| | Conf. | | | Overall |
| Team | W | | L | W | | L |
|---|---|---|---|---|---|---|
| No. 2 Miami (FL) $ | 7 | – | 0 | 12 | – | 1 |
| No. 25 West Virginia | 6 | – | 1 | 9 | – | 4 |
| No. 19 Pittsburgh | 5 | – | 2 | 9 | – | 4 |
| No. 18 Virginia Tech | 3 | – | 4 | 10 | – | 4 |
| Boston College | 3 | – | 4 | 9 | – | 4 |
| Temple | 2 | – | 5 | 4 | – | 8 |
| Syracuse | 2 | – | 5 | 4 | – | 8 |
| Rutgers | 0 | – | 7 | 1 | – | 11 |
$ – BCS representative as conference champion; Rankings from AP Poll

2002 Big Ten Conference football standings
| | Conf. | | | Overall |
| Team | W | | L | W | | L |
|---|---|---|---|---|---|---|
| No. 1 Ohio State $#+ | 8 | – | 0 | 14 | – | 0 |
| No. 8 Iowa %+ | 8 | – | 0 | 11 | – | 2 |
| No. 9 Michigan | 6 | – | 2 | 10 | – | 3 |
| No. 16 Penn State | 5 | – | 3 | 9 | – | 4 |
| Purdue | 4 | – | 4 | 7 | – | 6 |
| Illinois | 4 | – | 4 | 5 | – | 7 |
| Minnesota | 3 | – | 5 | 8 | – | 5 |
| Wisconsin | 2 | – | 6 | 8 | – | 6 |
| Michigan State | 2 | – | 6 | 4 | – | 8 |
| Northwestern | 1 | – | 7 | 3 | – | 9 |
| Indiana | 1 | – | 7 | 3 | – | 9 |
# – BCS National Champion; $ – BCS representative as conference champion; % – BCS at-large representative; + – Conference co-champions; Rankings from AP Poll

2002 Conference USA football standings
| | Conf. | | | Overall |
| Team | W | | L | W | | L |
|---|---|---|---|---|---|---|
| Cincinnati + | 6 | – | 2 | 7 | – | 7 |
| No. 23 TCU + | 6 | – | 2 | 10 | – | 2 |
| Louisville | 5 | – | 3 | 7 | – | 6 |
| Southern Miss | 5 | – | 3 | 7 | – | 6 |
| Tulane | 4 | – | 4 | 8 | – | 5 |
| UAB | 4 | – | 4 | 5 | – | 7 |
| East Carolina | 4 | – | 4 | 4 | – | 8 |
| Houston | 3 | – | 5 | 5 | – | 7 |
| Memphis | 2 | – | 6 | 3 | – | 9 |
| Army | 1 | – | 7 | 1 | – | 11 |
+ – Conference co-champions; Rankings from AP Poll

2002 Mid-American Conference football standings
| | Conf. | | | Overall |
| Team | W | | L | W | | L |
|---|---|---|---|---|---|---|
East Division
| No. 24 Marshall x$ | 7 | – | 1 | 11 | – | 2 |
| UCF | 6 | – | 2 | 7 | – | 5 |
| Miami (OH) | 5 | – | 3 | 7 | – | 5 |
| Ohio | 4 | – | 4 | 4 | – | 8 |
| Akron | 3 | – | 5 | 4 | – | 8 |
| Kent State | 1 | – | 7 | 3 | – | 9 |
| Buffalo | 0 | – | 8 | 1 | – | 11 |
West Division
| Toledo xy | 7 | – | 1 | 9 | – | 5 |
| Northern Illinois x | 7 | – | 1 | 8 | – | 4 |
| Bowling Green | 6 | – | 2 | 9 | – | 3 |
| Ball State | 4 | – | 4 | 6 | – | 6 |
| Western Michigan | 3 | – | 5 | 4 | – | 8 |
| Central Michigan | 2 | – | 6 | 4 | – | 8 |
| Eastern Michigan | 1 | – | 7 | 3 | – | 9 |
Championship: Marshall 49, Toledo 45
$ – Conference champion; x – Division champion/co-champions; Rankings from AP Poll

2002 Mountain West Conference football standings
| | Conf. | | | Overall |
| Team | W | | L | W | | L |
|---|---|---|---|---|---|---|
| Colorado State $ | 6 | – | 1 | 10 | – | 4 |
| New Mexico | 5 | – | 2 | 7 | – | 7 |
| Air Force | 4 | – | 3 | 8 | – | 5 |
| San Diego State | 4 | – | 3 | 4 | – | 9 |
| Utah | 3 | – | 4 | 5 | – | 6 |
| UNLV | 3 | – | 4 | 5 | – | 7 |
| BYU | 2 | – | 5 | 5 | – | 7 |
| Wyoming | 1 | – | 6 | 2 | – | 10 |
$ – Conference champion; Rankings from AP Poll

2002 Pacific-10 Conference football standings
| | Conf. | | | Overall |
| Team | W | | L | W | | L |
|---|---|---|---|---|---|---|
| No. 10 Washington State $+ | 7 | – | 1 | 10 | – | 3 |
| No. 4 USC %+ | 7 | – | 1 | 11 | – | 2 |
| Arizona State | 5 | – | 3 | 8 | – | 6 |
| Oregon State | 4 | – | 4 | 8 | – | 5 |
| UCLA | 4 | – | 4 | 8 | – | 5 |
| California | 4 | – | 4 | 7 | – | 5 |
| Washington | 4 | – | 4 | 7 | – | 6 |
| Oregon | 3 | – | 5 | 7 | – | 6 |
| Arizona | 1 | – | 7 | 4 | – | 8 |
| Stanford | 1 | – | 7 | 2 | – | 9 |
$ – BCS representative as conference champion; % – BCS at-large representative; + – Conference co-champions; Rankings from AP Poll

2002 Southeastern Conference football standings
| | Conf. | | | Overall |
| Team | W | | L | W | | L |
|---|---|---|---|---|---|---|
Eastern Division
| No. 3 Georgia x$ | 7 | – | 1 | 13 | – | 1 |
| Florida | 6 | – | 2 | 8 | – | 5 |
| Tennessee | 5 | – | 3 | 8 | – | 5 |
| Kentucky | 3 | – | 5 | 7 | – | 5 |
| South Carolina | 3 | – | 5 | 5 | – | 7 |
| Vanderbilt | 0 | – | 8 | 2 | – | 10 |
Western Division
| Arkansas xy | 5 | – | 3 | 9 | – | 5 |
| No. 14 Auburn x | 5 | – | 3 | 9 | – | 4 |
| LSU x | 5 | – | 3 | 8 | – | 5 |
| Ole Miss | 3 | – | 5 | 7 | – | 6 |
| Mississippi State | 0 | – | 8 | 3 | – | 9 |
| No. 11 ^Alabama | 6 | – | 2 | 10 | – | 3 |
Championship: Georgia 30, Arkansas 3
$ – BCS representative as conference champion; x – Division champion/co-champions; y – Championship game participant; ^ – Alabama had the best division record, but did not participate in postseason play due to NCAA probation.; Rankings from AP Poll

2002 Sun Belt Conference football standings
| | Conf. | | | Overall |
| Team | W | | L | W | | L |
|---|---|---|---|---|---|---|
| North Texas $ | 6 | – | 0 | 8 | – | 5 |
| New Mexico State | 5 | – | 1 | 7 | – | 5 |
| Arkansas State | 3 | – | 3 | 6 | – | 7 |
| Middle Tennessee | 2 | – | 4 | 4 | – | 8 |
| Louisiana–Lafayette | 2 | – | 4 | 3 | – | 9 |
| Louisiana–Monroe | 2 | – | 4 | 3 | – | 9 |
| Idaho | 1 | – | 5 | 2 | – | 10 |
$ – Conference champion

2002 Western Athletic Conference football standings
| | Conf. | | | Overall |
| Team | W | | L | W | | L |
|---|---|---|---|---|---|---|
| No. 15 Boise State $ | 8 | – | 0 | 12 | – | 1 |
| Hawaii | 7 | – | 1 | 10 | – | 4 |
| Fresno State | 6 | – | 2 | 9 | – | 5 |
| San Jose State | 4 | – | 4 | 6 | – | 7 |
| Nevada | 4 | – | 4 | 5 | – | 7 |
| Rice | 3 | – | 5 | 4 | – | 7 |
| Louisiana Tech | 3 | – | 5 | 4 | – | 8 |
| SMU | 3 | – | 5 | 3 | – | 9 |
| UTEP | 1 | – | 7 | 2 | – | 10 |
| Tulsa | 1 | – | 7 | 1 | – | 11 |
$ – Conference champion; Rankings from AP Poll

2002 NCAA Division I-A independents football records
| | Conf. | | | Overall |
| Team | W | | L | W | | L |
|---|---|---|---|---|---|---|
| South Florida | | – | | 9 | – | 2 |
| No. 17 Notre Dame | | – | | 10 | – | 3 |
| Connecticut | | – | | 6 | – | 6 |
| Utah State | | – | | 4 | – | 7 |
| Troy State | | – | | 4 | – | 8 |
| Navy | | – | | 2 | – | 10 |
Rankings from AP Poll

== I-AA team wins over I-A teams ==
Italics denotes I-AA teams.

| Date | Visiting team | Home team | Site | Result | Attendance | Ref. |
|---|---|---|---|---|---|---|
| August 29 | No. 6 (I-AA) Lehigh | Buffalo | University at Buffalo Stadium • Amherst, New York | 37–26 | 21,103 | |
| August 31 | Villanova | Rutgers | Rutgers Stadium • Piscataway, New Jersey | 37–19 | 19,101 | |
| September 7 | Holy Cross | Army | Michie Stadium • West Point, New York | 30–21 | 28,063 | |
| September 7 | No. 22 (I-AA) Northeastern | Ohio | Peden Stadium • Athens, Ohio | 31–0 | 21,002 | |
| September 14 | No. 3 (I-AA) McNeese State | UL Monroe | Malone Stadium • Monroe, Louisiana | 24–19 | 10,091 | |
| September 21 | No. 20 (I-AA) Western Illinois | Northern Illinois | Huskie Stadium • DeKalb, Illinois | 29–26 | 23,598 | |
| September 28 | Southeast Missouri State | Middle Tennessee | Johnny "Red" Floyd Stadium • Murfreesboro, Tennessee | 24–14 | 27,519 | |
| October 5 | No. 1 (I-AA) Montana | Idaho | Kibbie Dome • Moscow, Idaho (Little Brown Stein) | 38–31 | 14,047 | |
^{#}Rankings from AP Poll released prior to game.

== Bowl Championship Series rankings ==
| WEEK | No. 1 | No. 2 | EVENT |
|---|---|---|---|
| OCT 21 | Oklahoma | Miami | Oklahoma 49, Iowa State 3 |
| OCT 28 | Oklahoma | Miami | Ohio State 34, Minnesota 3 |
| NOV 4 | Oklahoma | Ohio State | Texas A&M 30, Oklahoma 26 |
| NOV 11 | Ohio State | Miami | Ohio State 23, Illinois 16 |
| NOV 18 | Miami | Ohio State | Miami 28, Pittsburgh 21 |
| NOV 25 | Miami | Ohio State | Miami 49, Syracuse 7 |
| DEC 2 | Miami | Ohio State | Miami 56, Virginia Tech 45 |
| FINAL | Miami | Ohio State | Ohio State 31, Miami 24 (2OT) |

== Final BCS rankings ==
| BCS | School | Record | BCS Bowl game |
|---|---|---|---|
| 1 | Miami (FL) | 12–0 | Fiesta |
| 2 | Ohio State | 13–0 | Fiesta |
| 3 | Georgia | 12–1 | Sugar |
| 4 | USC | 10–2 | Orange |
| 5 | Iowa | 11–1 | Orange |
| 6 | Washington State | 10–2 | Rose |
| 7 | Oklahoma | 11–2 | Rose |
| 8 | Kansas State | 10–2 | |
| 9 | Notre Dame | 10–2 | |
| 10 | Texas | 10–2 | |
| 11 | Michigan | 9–3 | |
| 12 | Penn State | 9–3 | |
| 13 | Colorado | 9–4 | |
| 14 | Florida State | 9–4 | Sugar |
| 15 | West Virginia | 9–4 | |

== Bowl games ==
The Rose Bowl normally features the champions of the Big Ten and the Pac-10. However, Big Ten-champion Ohio State, finishing No. 2 in the BCS, had qualified to play in the 2003 Fiesta Bowl for the national championship against Miami (Florida) Earlier in the season, Ohio State had defeated Washington State 25–7.

After the national championship was set, the Orange Bowl had the next pick, and invited No. 3 (No. 5 BCS) Iowa from the Big Ten. When it was the Rose Bowl's turn to select, the best available team was No. 8 (No. 7 BCS) Oklahoma, who won the Big 12 Championship Game. When it came time for the Orange Bowl and Sugar Bowl to make a second pick, both wanted Pac-10 co-champion USC. However, a BCS rule stated that if two bowls wanted the same team, the bowl with the higher payoff had priority. The Orange Bowl immediately extended an at-large bid to the No. 5 Trojans and paired them with at-large No. 3 Iowa in a Big Ten/Pac-10 "Rose Bowl East" matchup in the 2003 Orange Bowl. The Rose Bowl was left to pair Oklahoma with Pac-10 co-champion Washington State. Rose Bowl committee executive director Mitch Dorger was not pleased with the results.

As such, the BCS instituted a new rule, whereby a bowl losing its conference champion to the BCS championship could "protect" the second-place team from that conference from going to another bowl. This left the Sugar Bowl with No. 14 BCS Florida State, the winner of the Atlantic Coast Conference. Notre Dame at 10–2 and No. 9 in the BCS standings was invited to the 2003 Gator Bowl. Kansas State at No. 8 also was left out.

=== BCS bowls ===
- Fiesta Bowl: No. 2 Ohio State (BCS No. 2 Big Ten Champ) 31, No. 1 Miami (BCS No. 1 Big East Champ) 24 (2 OT)
- Sugar Bowl: No. 4 Georgia (BCS No. 3 SEC Champ) 26, No. 16 Florida State (BCS No. 14 ACC Champ) 13
- Orange Bowl: No. 5 USC (BCS No. 4) 38, No. 3 Iowa (BCS No. 5 At-Large) 17
- Rose Bowl: No. 8 Oklahoma (BCS No. 7 Big 12 Champ) 34, No. 7 Washington State (BCS No. 6 Pac-10 Champ) 14

=== Other New Year's Day bowls ===
- Cotton Bowl Classic: No. 9 Texas 35, LSU 20
- Capital One Bowl: No. 19 Auburn 13, No. 10 Penn State 9
- Gator Bowl: No. 17 NC State 28, No. 11 Notre Dame 6
- Outback Bowl: No. 12 Michigan 38, No. 22 Florida 30

=== December Bowl Games ===
- Holiday Bowl: No. 6 Kansas State 34, Arizona State 27
- Peach Bowl: No. 20 Maryland 30, Tennessee 3
- Tangerine Bowl: Texas Tech 55, Clemson 15
- Sun Bowl: Purdue 34, Washington 24
- Independence Bowl: Mississippi 27, Nebraska 23
- Alamo Bowl: Wisconsin 31, No. 14 Colorado 28
- Insight Bowl: No. 24 Pittsburgh 38, Oregon State 13
- Liberty Bowl: TCU (C-USA Champ) 25, No. 23 Colorado State (MWC Champ) 3
- Humanitarian Bowl: No. 18 Boise State (WAC Champ) 34, Iowa State 16
- Motor City Bowl: Boston College 51, Toledo 25
- Hawai'i Bowl: Tulane 36, Hawai'i 28
- Seattle Bowl: Wake Forest 38, Oregon 17
- San Francisco Bowl: No. 21 Virginia Tech 20, Air Force 13
- Music City Bowl: Minnesota 29, No. 25 Arkansas 14
- Las Vegas Bowl: UCLA 27, New Mexico 13
- GMAC Bowl: Marshall (MAC Champ) 38, Louisville 15
- Silicon Valley Classic: Fresno State 30, Georgia Tech 21
- Houston Bowl: Oklahoma State 33, Southern Miss 23
- Continental Tire Bowl: Virginia 48, No. 15 West Virginia 22
- New Orleans Bowl: North Texas (Sun Belt Champ) 24, Cincinnati 19

== Heisman Trophy voting ==
The Heisman Trophy is given to the year's most outstanding player

| Player | School | Position | 1st | 2nd | 3rd | Total |
|---|---|---|---|---|---|---|
| Carson Palmer | USC | QB | 242 | 224 | 154 | 1,328 |
| Brad Banks | Iowa | QB | 199 | 173 | 152 | 1,095 |
| Larry Johnson | Penn State | RB | 108 | 130 | 142 | 726 |
| Willis McGahee | Miami (FL) | RB | 101 | 118 | 121 | 660 |
| Ken Dorsey | Miami (FL) | QB | 122 | 89 | 99 | 643 |
| Byron Leftwich | Marshall | QB | 22 | 26 | 34 | 152 |
| Jason Gesser | Washington State | QB | 5 | 22 | 15 | 74 |
| Chris Brown | Colorado | RB | 5 | 11 | 11 | 48 |
| Kliff Kingsbury | Texas Tech | QB | 6 | 2 | 11 | 33 |
| Quentin Griffin | Oklahoma | RB | 1 | 8 | 9 | 28 |

== Other major awards ==
- Maxwell Award (College player of the Year): Larry Johnson, Penn State
- Walter Camp Award (top back): Larry Johnson, Penn State
- Associated Press Player of the Year: Brad Banks, Iowa
- Davey O'Brien Award (quarterback): Brad Banks, Iowa
- Johnny Unitas Award (Sr. quarterback): Carson Palmer, USC
- Doak Walker Award (running back): Larry Johnson, Penn State
- Fred Biletnikoff Award (wide receiver): Charles Rogers, Michigan State
- John Mackey Award (tight end): Dallas Clark, Iowa
- Dave Rimington Trophy (center): Brett Romberg, Miami
- Chuck Bednarik Award (defensive player): E. J. Henderson, Maryland
- Lombardi Award (top lineman): Terrell Suggs, Arizona State
- Outland Trophy (interior lineman): Rien Long, Washington State
- Dick Butkus (linebacker): E. J. Henderson, Maryland
- Jim Thorpe Award (defensive back): Terence Newman, Kansas State
- Lou Groza Award (placekicker): Nate Kaeding, Iowa
- Ray Guy Award (punter): Mark Mariscal, Colorado
- The Home Depot Coach of the Year Award: Ty Willingham, Notre Dame
- Paul "Bear" Bryant Award: Jim Tressel, Ohio St.

== Attendances ==
| # | Team | Games | Total | Average |
|---|---|---|---|---|
| 1 | Michigan | 7 | 774,033 | 110,576 |
| 2 | Penn State | 8 | 857,911 | 107,239 |
| 3 | Tennessee | 7 | 746,936 | 106,705 |
| 4 | Ohio State | 8 | 827,904 | 103,488 |
| 5 | LSU | 7 | 632,147 | 90,307 |
| 6 | Georgia | 7 | 605,640 | 86,520 |
| 7 | Florida | 7 | 596,296 | 85,185 |
| 8 | Auburn | 7 | 580,600 | 82,943 |
| 9 | Alabama | 7 | 579,999 | 82,857 |
| 10 | South Carolina | 6 | 492,828 | 82,138 |
| 11 | Florida State | 6 | 490,598 | 81,766 |
| 12 | Notre Dame | 6 | 484,910 | 80,818 |
| 13 | Texas A&M | 7 | 561,389 | 80,198 |
| 14 | Texas | 6 | 474,319 | 79,053 |
| 15 | Wisconsin | 8 | 624,182 | 78,023 |
| 16 | Nebraska | 8 | 622,415 | 77,802 |
| 17 | Clemson | 7 | 542,675 | 77,525 |
| 18 | Oklahoma | 6 | 450,621 | 75,104 |
| 19 | Michigan State | 8 | 591,539 | 73,942 |
| 20 | Washington | 7 | 500,042 | 71,435 |
| 21 | Miami Hurricanes | 6 | 417,233 | 69,539 |
| 22 | Southern California | 6 | 401,115 | 66,853 |
| 23 | UCLA | 6 | 392,375 | 65,396 |
| 24 | Kentucky | 7 | 449,084 | 64,155 |
| 25 | BYU | 6 | 373,055 | 62,176 |
| 26 | Iowa | 7 | 432,232 | 61,747 |
| 27 | Arkansas | 8 | 486,016 | 60,752 |
| 28 | Virginia Tech | 8 | 479,379 | 59,922 |
| 29 | Mississippi | 7 | 400,520 | 57,217 |
| 30 | Purdue | 7 | 395,008 | 56,430 |
| 31 | Virginia | 7 | 394,998 | 56,428 |
| 32 | Oregon | 8 | 450,730 | 56,341 |
| 33 | Illinois | 6 | 331,192 | 55,199 |
| 34 | Missouri | 6 | 316,339 | 52,723 |
| 35 | West Virginia | 6 | 314,477 | 52,413 |
| 36 | North Carolina | 6 | 301,750 | 50,292 |
| 37 | North Carolina State | 7 | 346,340 | 49,477 |
| 38 | Colorado | 6 | 295,316 | 49,219 |
| 39 | Mississippi State | 6 | 289,748 | 48,291 |
| 40 | Kansas State | 8 | 384,654 | 48,082 |
| 41 | Arizona State | 7 | 328,607 | 46,944 |
| 42 | Maryland | 7 | 323,758 | 46,251 |
| 43 | Arizona | 7 | 315,032 | 45,005 |
| 44 | Pittsburgh | 7 | 310,971 | 44,424 |
| 45 | Iowa State | 7 | 307,728 | 43,961 |
| 46 | Oklahoma State | 7 | 302,669 | 43,238 |
| 47 | Georgia Tech | 6 | 258,938 | 43,156 |
| 48 | Texas Tech | 6 | 258,758 | 43,126 |
| 49 | Air Force | 7 | 298,993 | 42,713 |
| 50 | Syracuse | 6 | 253,365 | 42,228 |
| 51 | Minnesota | 7 | 292,492 | 41,785 |
| 52 | Boston College | 7 | 287,737 | 41,105 |
| 53 | Fresno State | 6 | 234,800 | 39,133 |
| 54 | Stanford | 5 | 193,850 | 38,770 |
| 55 | Hawaii | 8 | 310,074 | 38,759 |
| 56 | California | 7 | 259,719 | 37,103 |
| 57 | Louisville | 6 | 218,838 | 36,473 |
| 58 | Oregon State | 7 | 255,054 | 36,436 |
| 59 | Kansas | 6 | 216,500 | 36,083 |
| 60 | Utah | 5 | 178,419 | 35,684 |
| 61 | Washington State | 6 | 203,328 | 33,888 |
| 62 | Navy | 6 | 203,210 | 33,868 |
| 63 | Army | 6 | 195,636 | 32,606 |
| 64 | Vanderbilt | 7 | 225,342 | 32,192 |
| 65 | Colorado State | 5 | 152,307 | 30,461 |
| 66 | East Carolina | 5 | 148,144 | 29,629 |
| 67 | New Mexico | 6 | 174,184 | 29,031 |
| 68 | Memphis | 6 | 170,362 | 28,394 |
| 69 | UTEP | 5 | 141,552 | 28,310 |
| 70 | Cincinnati | 7 | 196,497 | 28,071 |
| 71 | Baylor | 6 | 168,110 | 28,018 |
| 72 | Boise State | 7 | 195,641 | 27,949 |
| 73 | Tulane | 7 | 195,309 | 27,901 |
| 74 | TCU | 6 | 166,879 | 27,813 |
| 75 | Marshall | 7 | 194,520 | 27,789 |
| 76 | Northwestern | 6 | 165,574 | 27,596 |
| 77 | UNLV | 6 | 165,493 | 27,582 |
| 78 | Indiana | 6 | 163,038 | 27,173 |
| 79 | Southern Miss | 6 | 161,766 | 26,961 |
| 80 | Wake Forest | 6 | 159,222 | 26,537 |
| 81 | South Florida | 6 | 157,824 | 26,304 |
| 82 | San Diego State | 5 | 126,650 | 25,330 |
| 83 | Toledo | 6 | 143,791 | 23,965 |
| 84 | Duke | 6 | 139,332 | 23,222 |
| 85 | Wyoming | 6 | 135,654 | 22,609 |
| 86 | New Mexico State | 5 | 110,813 | 22,163 |
| 87 | UCF | 6 | 131,832 | 21,972 |
| 88 | Northern Illinois | 6 | 125,715 | 20,953 |
| 89 | Rice | 5 | 100,344 | 20,069 |
| 90 | Rutgers | 6 | 118,910 | 19,818 |
| 91 | Temple | 7 | 133,536 | 19,077 |
| 92 | Tulsa | 6 | 113,914 | 18,986 |
| 93 | Nevada | 6 | 113,508 | 18,918 |
| 94 | Western Michigan | 6 | 113,263 | 18,877 |
| 95 | Louisiana Tech | 5 | 92,383 | 18,477 |
| 96 | SMU | 6 | 109,752 | 18,292 |
| 97 | Miami RedHawks | 5 | 91,425 | 18,285 |
| 98 | Ohio | 5 | 90,382 | 18,076 |
| 99 | Bowling Green | 6 | 107,016 | 17,836 |
| 100 | Central Michigan | 6 | 103,865 | 17,311 |
| 101 | Utah State | 5 | 84,145 | 16,829 |
| 102 | UAB | 6 | 98,682 | 16,447 |
| 103 | Connecticut | 6 | 94,843 | 15,807 |
| 104 | North Texas | 5 | 76,302 | 15,260 |
| 105 | Louisiana-Lafayette | 5 | 75,279 | 15,056 |
| 106 | Buffalo | 6 | 83,770 | 13,962 |
| 107 | Troy | 4 | 53,611 | 13,403 |
| 108 | Houston | 6 | 75,018 | 12,503 |
| 109 | Ball State | 5 | 61,519 | 12,304 |
| 110 | Akron | 5 | 57,999 | 11,600 |
| 111 | Middle Tennessee | 5 | 55,816 | 11,163 |
| 112 | Idaho | 5 | 54,655 | 10,931 |
| 113 | Eastern Michigan | 6 | 64,659 | 10,777 |
| 114 | Arkansas State | 7 | 75,114 | 10,731 |
| 115 | San Jose State | 4 | 41,438 | 10,360 |
| 116 | Louisiana-Monroe | 6 | 50,822 | 8,470 |
| 117 | Kent State | 6 | 50,769 | 8,462 |
