= 2002 Virginia Cavaliers football team =

American college football season

2002 Virginia Cavaliers football

Continental Tire Bowl champion

Continental Tire Bowl, W 48–22 vs. West Virginia
- Conference: Atlantic Coast Conference

Ranking
- Coaches: No. 25
- AP: No. 22
- Record: 9–5 (6–2 ACC)
- Head coach: Al Groh (2nd season)
- Offensive coordinator: Bill Musgrave (2nd season)
- Defensive coordinator: Al Golden (2nd season)
- Captains: Angelo Crowell; Billy McMullen
- Home stadium: Scott Stadium

2002 Atlantic Coast Conference football standings
	Conf.			Overall
Team	W		L	W		L
No. 21 Florida State $	7	–	1	9	–	5
No. 22 Virginia	6	–	2	9	–	5
No. 13 Maryland	6	–	2	11	–	3
No. 12 NC State	5	–	3	11	–	3
Clemson	4	–	4	7	–	6
Georgia Tech	4	–	4	7	–	6
Wake Forest	3	–	5	7	–	6
North Carolina	1	–	7	3	–	9
Duke	0	–	8	2	–	10
$ – BCS representative as conference champion; Rankings from AP Poll

The 2002 Virginia Cavaliers football team represented the University of Virginia as a member of the Atlantic Coast Conference (ACC) during the 2002 NCAA Division I-A football season. Led by second-year head coach Al Groh, the Cavaliers compiled an overall record of 9–5 with a mark of 6–2 in conference play, tying for second place in the ACC. Virginia was invited to the Continental Tire Bowl, where the Cavaliers defeated West Virginia. The team played home games at Scott Stadium in Charlottesville, Virginia.

== Schedule ==
Date	Time	Opponent	Site	TV	Result	Attendance
August 22	7:30 pm	Colorado State*	Scott Stadium; Charlottesville, VA (Jim Thorpe Classic)	FSN	L 29–35	57,120
August 31	3:30 pm	at No. 5 Florida State	Doak Campbell Stadium; Tallahassee, FL (Jefferson–Eppes Trophy)	ABC	L 19–40	79,406
September 7	7:45 pm	No. 22 South Carolina*	Scott Stadium; Charlottesville, VA	ESPN	W 34–21	60,171
September 21	3:00 pm	Akron*^{†}	Scott Stadium; Charlottesville, VA		W 48–29	56,216
September 28	6:30 pm	at Wake Forest	Groves Stadium; Winston-Salem, NC		W 38–34	25,883
October 5	12:00 pm	at Duke	Wallace Wade Stadium; Durham, NC	JPS	W 27–22	17,638
October 12	12:00 pm	Clemson	Scott Stadium; Charlottesville, VA	ESPN2	W 22–17	54,114
October 19	12:00 pm	North Carolina	Scott Stadium; Charlottesville, VA (South's Oldest Rivalry)	JPS	W 37–27	55,648
October 26	3:30 pm	at Georgia Tech	Bobby Dodd Stadium; Atlanta, GA	ABC	L 15–23	42,727
November 9	3:30 pm	at No. 19 Penn State*	Beaver Stadium; University Park, PA	ABC	L 14–35	108,698
November 16	12:00 pm	No. 22 NC State	Scott Stadium; Charlottesville, VA	JPS	W 14–9	53,371
November 23	5:30 pm	No. 18 Maryland	Scott Stadium; Charlottesville, VA (rivalry)	ESPN2	W 48–13	58,358
November 30	3:30 pm	at No. 22 Virginia Tech*	Lane Stadium; Blacksburg, VA (rivalry)	ESPN	L 9–21	65,097
December 28	12:00 pm	vs. No. 15 West Virginia*	Ericsson Stadium; Charlotte, NC (Continental Tire Bowl)	ESPN2	W 48–22	73,535
*Non-conference game; ^{†}Homecoming; Rankings from AP Poll released prior to the game; All times are in Eastern time

== Personnel ==
=== Coaching staff ===
Name	Position
Al Groh	Head coach
Danny Rocco	Assistant head coach / linebackers coach
Al Golden	Defensive coordinator
Bill Musgrave	Offensive coordinator / quarterbacks / tight ends coach
Corwin Brown	Special teams coach
Mike Groh	Wide receivers coach
Mike London	Defensive line coach / recruiting coordinator
Bob Price	Defensive backs coach
Ron Prince	Offensive line coach
Kevin Ross	Running backs coach
Andy Heck	Graduate assistant coach – offense
Reed Case	Graduate assistant coach – defense

=== Roster ===
2002 Virginia Cavaliers football team roster
Players
Coaches
Offense

Pos.	#	Name	Class
QB	7	Matt Schaub	Jr
WR	11	Billy McMullen	Sr
OT	69	Brad Butler	Fr
C	78	Mitch Kimball	Jr
FB	86	Kase Luzar	Jr
TE	89	Heath Miller	So

Defense

Pos.	#	Name	Class
LB	55	Angelo Crowell	Sr
LB	56	Darryl Blackstock	Fr
DT	95	Chris Canty	So

Special teams

Pos.	#	Name	Class
K	8	Kurt Smith	Fr
P	9	Bryce Coffee	Jr

Head coach

- Al Groh

Coordinators/assistant coaches

Legend

- (C) Team captain
- (S) Suspended
- (I) Ineligible
- Injured
- Redshirt

Roster
