= 2002 Akron Zips football team =

American college football season

2002 Akron Zips football
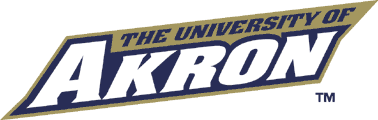
- Conference: Mid-American Conference
- East Division
- Record: 4–8 (3–5 MAC)
- Head coach: Lee Owens (8th season)
- Offensive coordinator: Paul Winters (8th season)
- Defensive coordinator: Joe Tresey (1st season)
- Home stadium: Rubber Bowl

2002 Mid-American Conference football standings
	Conf.			Overall
Team	W		L	W		L
East Division
No. 24 Marshall x$	7	–	1	11	–	2
UCF	6	–	2	7	–	5
Miami (OH)	5	–	3	7	–	5
Ohio	4	–	4	4	–	8
Akron	3	–	5	4	–	8
Kent State	1	–	7	3	–	9
Buffalo	0	–	8	1	–	11
West Division
Toledo xy	7	–	1	9	–	5
Northern Illinois x	7	–	1	8	–	4
Bowling Green	6	–	2	9	–	3
Ball State	4	–	4	6	–	6
Western Michigan	3	–	5	4	–	8
Central Michigan	2	–	6	4	–	8
Eastern Michigan	1	–	7	3	–	9
Championship: Marshall 49, Toledo 45
$ – Conference champion; x – Division champion/co-champions; Rankings from AP Poll

The 2002 Akron Zips football team represented the University of Akron in the 2002 NCAA Division I-A football season. Akron competed as a member of the East Division of the Mid-American Conference (MAC). The Zips were led by head coach Lee Owens.

== Schedule ==
Date	Time	Opponent	Site	TV	Result	Attendance	Source
August 31	11:00 a.m.	at Iowa*	Kinnick Stadium; Iowa City, IA	ESPN Plus	L 21–57	51,493	
September 7	6:00 p.m.	at Maryland*	Byrd Stadium; College Park, MD		L 14–44	48,057	
September 14	6:00 p.m.	Central Michigan	Rubber Bowl; Akron, OH		L 17–24	15,629	
September 21	3:00 p.m.	at Virginia*	Scott Stadium; Charlottesville, VA		L 29–48	56,216	
September 28	6:00 p.m.	Miami (OH)	Rubber Bowl; Akron, OH		L 31–48	17,298	
October 5	6:00 p.m.	at Eastern Michigan	Rynearson Stadium; Ypsilanti, MI		L 34–42	10,075	
October 12	2:00 p.m.	Liberty*	Rubber Bowl; Akron, OH		W 49–21	7,132	
October 26	4:00 p.m.	at Central Florida	Florida Citrus Bowl; Orlando, FL		L 17–28	18,278	
November 2	3:30 p.m.	Marshall	Rubber Bowl; Akron, OH		W 34–20	13,762	
November 9	2:00 p.m.	at Ohio	Peden Stadium; Athens, OH		L 10–27	17,788	
November 16	1:00 p.m.	Buffalo	Rubber Bowl; Akron, OH		W 21–10	4,178	
November 23	2:00 p.m.	at Kent State	Dix Stadium; Kent, OH (Wagon Wheel)		W 48–10	3,278	
*Non-conference game; All times are in Eastern time

== Roster ==
2002 Akron Zips football team roster
Players
Coaches
Offense

Pos.	#	Name	Class
WR	2	Matthew Cherry	Jr
QB	5	Charlie Frye	So
QB	16	Jonathan Gill	Jr
RB	35	Jay Rohr	Fr
FB	36	Dan Basch	Jr
TE	38	Nick Fortener	Sr
RB	40	Jerell Ringer	Fr
RB	42	Bob Hendry	Jr
OL	61	Jim Borrieci	So
OL	62	Mike Piccirillo	Jr
OL	63	Andy Wills	Fr
OL	65	Aaron Feller	So
OL	69	Aaron Conley	So
OL	70	Bryan Shaw	Jr
OL	71	Mike Grzeskowiak	So
OL	72	Tim Crouch	Fr
OL	75	Mike Donaldson	Fr
OL	76	Justin Hein	Fr
OL	77	Willie Cook	So
OL	78	Jud Cummins	Jr

Defense

Pos.	#	Name	Class
DB	1	Rickey McKenzie	Jr
DB	4	Sekai Greer	So
DB	23	Domenik Hixon	Fr
DB	24	Montae Russell	So
LB	44	Chase Blackburn	So
DL	54	Josh Hill	Sr
LB	58	Matt Robinson	Jr

Special teams

Pos.	#	Name	Class
P/K	14	Billy Sullivan	Fr

Head coach

- Lee Owens

Coordinators/assistant coaches

Legend

- (C) Team captain
- (S) Suspended
- (I) Ineligible
- Injured
- Redshirt

Roster
