= 2002 Ohio Bobcats football team =

American college football season

2002 Ohio Bobcats football
- Conference: Mid-American Conference
- East
- Record: 4–8 (4–4 MAC)
- Head coach: Brian Knorr (2nd season)
- Offensive coordinator: Greg Gregory (2nd season)
- Defensive coordinator: Tim DeRuyter (1st in stint; 5th overall season)
- Home stadium: Peden Stadium

2002 Mid-American Conference football standings
	Conf.			Overall
Team	W		L	W		L
East Division
No. 24 Marshall x$	7	–	1	11	–	2
UCF	6	–	2	7	–	5
Miami (OH)	5	–	3	7	–	5
Ohio	4	–	4	4	–	8
Akron	3	–	5	4	–	8
Kent State	1	–	7	3	–	9
Buffalo	0	–	8	1	–	11
West Division
Toledo xy	7	–	1	9	–	5
Northern Illinois x	7	–	1	8	–	4
Bowling Green	6	–	2	9	–	3
Ball State	4	–	4	6	–	6
Western Michigan	3	–	5	4	–	8
Central Michigan	2	–	6	4	–	8
Eastern Michigan	1	–	7	3	–	9
Championship: Marshall 49, Toledo 45
$ – Conference champion; x – Division champion/co-champions; Rankings from AP Poll

The 2002 Ohio Bobcats football team represented Ohio University during the 2002 NCAA Division I-A football season. Ohio competed as a member of the Mid-American Conference (MAC). The Bobcats were led by second year head coach Brian Knorr. They played their home games in Peden Stadium in Athens, Ohio.

== Schedule ==
Date	Time	Opponent	Site	TV	Result	Attendance
August 31	7:00 pm	at Pittsburgh*	Heinz Field; Pittsburgh, PA		L 14–27	41,579
September 7	7:00 pm	No. 22 (I-AA) Northeastern*	Peden Stadium; Athens, OH		L 0–31	21,002
September 14	6:00 pm	at No. 12 Florida*	Ben Hill Griffin Stadium; Gainesville, FL	PPV	L 6–34	84,002
September 21	12:00 pm	at Connecticut*	Memorial Stadium; Storrs, CT		L 19–37	15,901
September 28	7:00 pm	Buffalo	Peden Stadium; Athens, OH		W 34–32	12,512
October 5	4:00 pm	at Bowling Green	Doyt Perry Stadium; Bowling Green, OH	ONN	L 21–72	20,069
October 12	2:00 pm	Eastern Michigan	Peden Stadium; Athens, OH		W 55–27	19,155
October 19	2:00 pm	at Kent State	Dix Stadium; Kent, OH	ONN	W 50–0	10,250
November 2	1:00 pm	at Miami (OH)	Yager Stadium; Oxford, OH (Battle of the Bricks)	ONN	L 20–38	27,253
November 9	2:00 pm	Akron	Peden Stadium; Athens, OH		W 27–10	17,788
November 23	3:30 pm	Marshall	Peden Stadium; Athens, OH (Battle for the Bell)		L 21–24	21,110
November 30	1:00 pm	at UCF	Citrus Bowl; Orlando, FL		L 32–42	12,462
*Non-conference game; Rankings from AP Poll released prior to the game; All times are in Eastern time
