= 2002 Northern Illinois Huskies football team =

American college football season

2002 Northern Illinois Huskies football

MAC West Division co-champion
- Conference: Mid-American Conference
- West Division
- Record: 8–4 (7–1 MAC)
- Head coach: Joe Novak (7th season)
- Offensive coordinator: Dan Roushar (5th season)
- MVPs: Michael Turner; Larry Williams
- Captains: Eric Didesch; P. J. Fleck; Thomas Hammock; Vince Thompson; Tim Vincent; Larry Williams
- Home stadium: Huskie Stadium

2002 Mid-American Conference football standings
	Conf.			Overall
Team	W		L	W		L
East Division
No. 24 Marshall x$	7	–	1	11	–	2
UCF	6	–	2	7	–	5
Miami (OH)	5	–	3	7	–	5
Ohio	4	–	4	4	–	8
Akron	3	–	5	4	–	8
Kent State	1	–	7	3	–	9
Buffalo	0	–	8	1	–	11
West Division
Toledo xy	7	–	1	9	–	5
Northern Illinois x	7	–	1	8	–	4
Bowling Green	6	–	2	9	–	3
Ball State	4	–	4	6	–	6
Western Michigan	3	–	5	4	–	8
Central Michigan	2	–	6	4	–	8
Eastern Michigan	1	–	7	3	–	9
Championship: Marshall 49, Toledo 45
$ – Conference champion; x – Division champion/co-champions; Rankings from AP Poll

The 2002 Northern Illinois Huskies football team represented Northern Illinois University as a member of the West Division of the Mid-American Conference (MAC) during the 2002 NCAA Division I-A football season. Led by seventh-year head coach Joe Novak, the Huskies compiled an overall record of 8–4 with a mark of 7–1 in conference play, sharing the MAC's West Division title with Toledo. By virtue of their head-to-head win over Northern Illinois, the Toledo Rockets advanced to the MAC Championship Game. Despite reaching bowl eligibility, the Huskies were not invited to a bowl game. Northern Illinois played home games at Huskie Stadium in DeKalb, Illinois.

== Schedule ==
Date	Time	Opponent	Site	TV	Result	Attendance	Source
August 29	6:30 pm	Wake Forest*	Huskie Stadium; DeKalb, IL	FSN	W 42–41 ^{OT}	19,653	
September 7	6:00 pm	at South Florida*	Raymond James Stadium; Tampa, FL		L 6–37	23,559	
September 14	11:00 am	at No. 22 Wisconsin*	Camp Randall Stadium; Madison, WI	ESPN Plus	L 21–24	77,460	
September 21	6:30 pm	Western Illinois*	Huskie Stadium; DeKalb, IL		L 26–29	23,598	
September 28	1:00 pm	Kent State	Huskie Stadium; DeKalb, IL		W 13–6	16,302	
October 5	1:00 pm	at Ball State	Ball State Stadium; Muncie, IN (rivalry)		W 41–29	14,499	
October 12	1:00 pm	at Miami (OH)	Yager Stadium; Oxford, OH		W 48–41	15,234	
October 19	1:00 pm	Central Michigan	Huskie Stadium; DeKalb, IL		W 49–0	20,186	
October 26	12:00 pm	at Western Michigan	Waldo Stadium; Kalamazoo, MI		W 24–20	15,049	
November 9	1:30 pm	No. 20 Bowling Green	Huskie Stadium; DeKalb, IL	FSN	W 26–17	25,822	
November 16	12:00 pm	at Eastern Michigan	Rynearson Stadium; Ypsilanti, MI		W 49–21	5,567	
November 23	11:00 am	Toledo	Huskie Stadium; DeKalb, IL	FSN	L 30–33	20,154	
*Non-conference game; Rankings from AP Poll released prior to the game; All times are in Central time

== Roster ==
2002 Northern Illinois Huskies football team roster
Players
Coaches
Offense

Pos.	#	Name	Class
TE	89	Brad Cieslak	Fr
WR	82	P. J. Fleck	Sr
QB	6	Ryan Gilbert	Jr
QB	10	Josh Haldi	So
TB	28	Thomas Hammock	Sr
RB	24	A. J. Harris	Fr
WR	84	Sam Hurd	Fr
WR		Edgar Rodriquez	Fr
WR	83	Shatone Powers	Fr
TB	8	Jeremy Pugh	Fr
WR	88	Turner Pugh	Jr
TE	80	Pat Raleigh	Fr
FB	34	Mike Scaramella	Jr
G	64	Shaun Schroeder	Jr
WR	5	Dan Sheldon	So
G	69	Graham Sleight	Jr
RB	32	Michael Turner	Jr

Defense

Pos.	#	Name	Class
DT	91	Leonard Cooksey	Jr
DT	51	Eric Didesch	Sr
FS		Keafta Dokes	Fr
SS	37	Justin Dole	Sr
CB	18	Randee Drew	Jr
LB	45	Nick Duffy	Jr
CB	29	Deon Smith	Fr
SS	48	Ray Smith	Fr
LB	40	Willie Smith	So

Special teams

Pos.	#	Name	Class

Head coach

- Joe Novak

Coordinators/assistant coaches

- George McDonald – Wide receivers

Legend

- (C) Team captain
- (S) Suspended
- (I) Ineligible
- Injured
- Redshirt

Roster
Last update: October 2, 2002
