= 2002 Toledo Rockets football team =

American college football season

2002 Toledo Rockets football

MAC West Division co-champion

MAC Championship Game vs. Marshall, L 45–49

Motor City Bowl, L 25–51 vs. Boston College
- Conference: Mid-American Conference
- West Division
- Record: 9–5 (7–1 MAC)
- Head coach: Tom Amstutz (2nd season)
- Offensive coordinator: Rob Spence (2nd season)
- Offensive scheme: Spread
- Defensive coordinator: Lou West (2nd season)
- Base defense: 4–4
- Home stadium: Glass Bowl

2002 Mid-American Conference football standings
	Conf.			Overall
Team	W		L	W		L
East Division
No. 24 Marshall x$	7	–	1	11	–	2
UCF	6	–	2	7	–	5
Miami (OH)	5	–	3	7	–	5
Ohio	4	–	4	4	–	8
Akron	3	–	5	4	–	8
Kent State	1	–	7	3	–	9
Buffalo	0	–	8	1	–	11
West Division
Toledo xy	7	–	1	9	–	5
Northern Illinois x	7	–	1	8	–	4
Bowling Green	6	–	2	9	–	3
Ball State	4	–	4	6	–	6
Western Michigan	3	–	5	4	–	8
Central Michigan	2	–	6	4	–	8
Eastern Michigan	1	–	7	3	–	9
Championship: Marshall 49, Toledo 45
$ – Conference champion; x – Division champion/co-champions; Rankings from AP Poll

The 2002 Toledo Rockets football team represented the University of Toledo during the 2002 NCAA Division I-A football season. They competed as a member of the Mid-American Conference (MAC) in the West Division. The Rockets were led by head coach Tom Amstutz.

== Schedule ==
Date	Time	Opponent	Site	TV	Result	Attendance
August 29	7:00 pm	Cal Poly*	Glass Bowl; Toledo, Ohio		W 44–16	23,074
September 7	6:00 pm	at Eastern Michigan	Rynearson Stadium; Ypsilanti, Michigan		W 65–13	16,843
September 14	2:30 pm	at Minnesota*	Hubert H. Humphrey Metrodome; Minneapolis		L 21–31	36,640
September 21	7:00 pm	UNLV*	Glass Bowl; Toledo, Ohio		W 38–21	26,050
September 28	1:30 pm	at Pittsburgh*	Heinz Field; Pittsburgh		L 19–37	39,713
October 12	7:00 pm	Ball State^{†}	Glass Bowl; Toledo, Ohio		W 27–24	25,926
October 19	6:00 pm	at Central Florida	Citrus Bowl; Orlando, Florida	TV5	W 27–24	18,815
October 26	7:00 pm	Miami (OH)	Glass Bowl; Toledo, Ohio		L 13–27	24,466
November 9	7:00 pm	Central Michigan	Glass Bowl; Toledo, Ohio		W 44–17	18,944
November 16	3:30 pm	at Western Michigan	Waldo Stadium; Kalamazoo, Michigan	FSN	W 42–21	9,844
November 23	12:00 pm	at Northern Illinois	Huskie Stadium; DeKalb, Illinois	FSN	W 33–30	20,154
November 30	7:00 pm	Bowling Green	Glass Bowl; Toledo, Ohio (Battle of I-75)		W 42–24	25,331
December 7	2:30 pm	at Marshall	Marshall University Stadium; Huntington, West Virginia (MAC Championship)	ESPN2	L 45–49	24,582
December 26	5:00 pm	vs. Boston College*	Ford Field; Detroit (Motor City Bowl)	ESPN	L 25–51	51,872
*Non-conference game; ^{†}Homecoming; All times are in Eastern time

== Roster ==
2002 Toledo Rockets football team roster
Players
Coaches
Offense

Pos.	#	Name	Class
WR	2	Carl Ford	Sr
QB	7	Bruce Gradkowski	Fr
QB	10	Brian Jones	Sr
WR	14	Lance Moore	So
G	68	Nick Kaczur	So
OL	78	Mike Sacco	So
OL	79	Noah Swartz	Sr

Defense

Pos.	#	Name	Class
SS	11	Patrick Body	So
CB	12	Brandon Hefflin	Jr
CB	25	James Stanley	Sr

Special teams

Pos.	#	Name	Class

Head coach

- Tom Amstutz

Coordinators/assistant coaches

- Joe Gilbert o-line coach

Legend

- (C) Team captain
- (S) Suspended
- (I) Ineligible
- Injured
- Redshirt

Roster
Last update: 2002-10-21

== After the season ==
=== NFL draft ===
The following Rocket was selected in the 2003 NFL draft following the season.

Round	Pick	Player	Position	NFL club
7	256	Carl Ford	Wide receiver	Green Bay Packers
