= 2002 MAC Championship Game =

- Conference Championship
- 2002 MAC Championship Game Logo
Toledo Rockets	Marshall Thundering Herd
(9–3)	(9–2)
45	49
Head coach: Tom Amstutz	Head coach: Bob Pruett
	1	2	3	4	Total
Toledo	0	17	15	13	45
Marshall	14	14	7	14	49
- Date: December 7, 2002
- Season: 2002
- Stadium: Marshall Stadium
- Location: Huntington, West Virginia
- MVP: QB Byron Leftwich (Marshall)
- Favorite: Marshall by 2.5
- Attendance: 24,582

United States TV coverage
- Network: ESPN2

2002 Mid-American Conference football standings
	Conf.			Overall
Team	W		L	W		L
East Division
No. 24 Marshall x$	7	–	1	11	–	2
UCF	6	–	2	7	–	5
Miami (OH)	5	–	3	7	–	5
Ohio	4	–	4	4	–	8
Akron	3	–	5	4	–	8
Kent State	1	–	7	3	–	9
Buffalo	0	–	8	1	–	11
West Division
Toledo xy	7	–	1	9	–	5
Northern Illinois x	7	–	1	8	–	4
Bowling Green	6	–	2	9	–	3
Ball State	4	–	4	6	–	6
Western Michigan	3	–	5	4	–	8
Central Michigan	2	–	6	4	–	8
Eastern Michigan	1	–	7	3	–	9
Championship: Marshall 49, Toledo 45
$ – Conference champion; x – Division champion/co-champions; Rankings from AP Poll

The 2002 MAC Championship Game was played on December 7, 2002 at Marshall Stadium, now known as Joan C. Edwards Stadium, in Huntington, West Virginia. The game featured the winner of each division of the Mid-American Conference. The game featured the Marshall Thundering Herd, of the East Division, and the Toledo Rockets, of the West Division. The Thundering Herd beat the Rockets 49–45.
