= 2002 Buffalo Bulls football team =

American college football season

2002 Buffalo Bulls football
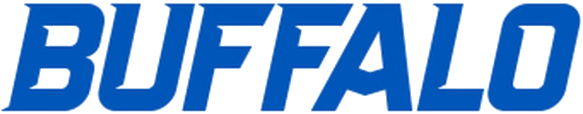
- Conference: Mid-American Conference
- East Division
- Record: 1–11 (0–8 MAC)
- Head coach: Jim Hofher (2nd season)
- Captains: Chad Bartoszek; Marquis Dwarte; Lamar Wilcher
- Home stadium: University at Buffalo Stadium

2002 Mid-American Conference football standings
	Conf.			Overall
Team	W		L	W		L
East Division
No. 24 Marshall x$	7	–	1	11	–	2
UCF	6	–	2	7	–	5
Miami (OH)	5	–	3	7	–	5
Ohio	4	–	4	4	–	8
Akron	3	–	5	4	–	8
Kent State	1	–	7	3	–	9
Buffalo	0	–	8	1	–	11
West Division
Toledo xy	7	–	1	9	–	5
Northern Illinois x	7	–	1	8	–	4
Bowling Green	6	–	2	9	–	3
Ball State	4	–	4	6	–	6
Western Michigan	3	–	5	4	–	8
Central Michigan	2	–	6	4	–	8
Eastern Michigan	1	–	7	3	–	9
Championship: Marshall 49, Toledo 45
$ – Conference champion; x – Division champion/co-champions; Rankings from AP Poll

The 2002 Buffalo Bulls football team represented the University at Buffalo as a member of the Mid-American Conference (MAC) during the 2002 NCAA Division I-AA football season. Led by second-year head coach Jim Hofher, the Bulls compiled an overall record of 1–11 with a mark of 0–8 in conference play, placing last out of seven teams in the MAC's East Division. The team played home games at the University at Buffalo Stadium in Amherst, New York.

Though the Bulls went 1–11 on the season, they did make team history by recording their first victory over a team from a power conference, a 34–11 road victory over Big East Conference member Rutgers on September 7.

== Schedule ==
Date	Time	Opponent	Site	Result	Attendance	Source
August 29	7:30 pm	Lehigh*	University at Buffalo Stadium; Amherst, NY	L 26–37	21,103	
September 7	7:00 pm	at Rutgers*	Rutgers Stadium; Piscataway, NJ	W 34–11	19,101	
September 14	7:30 pm	Connecticut*	University at Buffalo Stadium; Amherst, NY	L 3–24	17,012	
September 21	2:30 pm	at Minnesota*	Hubert H. Humphrey Metrodome; Minneapolis, MN	L 17–41	34,294	
September 28	7:00 pm	at Ohio	Peden Stadium; Athens, OH	L 32–34	12,512	
October 5	1:00 pm	Western Michigan	University at Buffalo Stadium; Amherst, NY	L 17–31	8,112	
October 12	4:30 pm	at Marshall	Marshall University Stadium; Huntington, WV	L 21–66	28,200	
October 19	1:00 pm	Miami (OH)	University at Buffalo Stadium; Amherst, NY	L 0–49	9,213	
October 26	1:00 pm	Kent State	University at Buffalo Stadium; Amherst, NY	L 12–16	5,102	
November 9	1:00 pm	UCF	University at Buffalo Stadium; Amherst, NY	L 21–45	6,923	
November 16	1:00 pm	at Akron	Rubber Bowl; Akron, OH	L 10–21	4,178	
November 23	1:00 pm	at Ball State	Ball State Stadium; Muncie, IN	L 21–41	7,957	
*Non-conference game; All times are in Eastern time

== Roster ==
2002 Buffalo Bulls football team roster
Players
Coaches
Offense

Pos.	#	Name	Class
TE	88	Chad Bartoszek	Sr
WR	20	Maurice Bradford	Fr
WR	84	Carnell Jones	Fr
RB	22	Dave Dawson	Fr
OL	64	Kevin Dunn	So
RB	28	Marquis Dwarte	Jr
RB	36	Dimitri Facaros	Fr
WR	81	Andre Forde	Sr
OL	69	Ted Howard	Fr
WR	14	Adam Johnson	So
WR	82	Dan Lindsay	Sr
WR	85	Matt Knueven	So
QB	7	Randall Secky	So
RB	40	Tom Shaughnessy	Jr

Defense

Pos.	#	Name	Class
DE	56	Anthony Andriano	So
DE	52	Demetrius Austrum	So
LB	33	Ryan Buttles	Jr
DL	96	Rashad Clark	Fr
LB	55	Chris Clifton	Fr
LB	1	Jason Coley	Sr
DB	23	Kevin Concepcion	Fr
LB	46	Bryan Cummings	Fr
DB	29	J. J. Gibson	So
DB	2	Mark Graham	Jr
LB	30	Roman Guzman	Fr
LB	93	Obadiah Harris	Fr

Special teams

Pos.	#	Name	Class
K	18	Michael Baker	Fr
K	5	Dallas Pelz	Jr

Head coach

- Jim Hofher

Coordinators/assistant coaches

Legend

- (C) Team captain
- (S) Suspended
- (I) Ineligible
- Injured
- Redshirt

Roster
Last update: 2002-07-27
