= 2002 Marshall Thundering Herd football team =

American college football season

2002 Marshall Thundering Herd football

MAC champion MAC East Division champion GMAC Bowl champion

MAC Championship Game, W 49–45 vs. Toledo

GMAC Bowl, W 38–15 vs. Louisville
- Conference: Mid-American Conference
- East

Ranking
- Coaches: No. 19
- AP: No. 24
- Record: 11–2 (7–1 MAC)
- Head coach: Bob Pruett (7th season)
- Offensive coordinator: Mark McHale (1st season)
- Co-offensive coordinator: Larry Kueck (2nd season)
- Defensive coordinator: Bill Wilt (1st season)
- Home stadium: Marshall University Stadium

2002 Mid-American Conference football standings
	Conf.			Overall
Team	W		L	W		L
East Division
No. 24 Marshall x$	7	–	1	11	–	2
UCF	6	–	2	7	–	5
Miami (OH)	5	–	3	7	–	5
Ohio	4	–	4	4	–	8
Akron	3	–	5	4	–	8
Kent State	1	–	7	3	–	9
Buffalo	0	–	8	1	–	11
West Division
Toledo xy	7	–	1	9	–	5
Northern Illinois x	7	–	1	8	–	4
Bowling Green	6	–	2	9	–	3
Ball State	4	–	4	6	–	6
Western Michigan	3	–	5	4	–	8
Central Michigan	2	–	6	4	–	8
Eastern Michigan	1	–	7	3	–	9
Championship: Marshall 49, Toledo 45
$ – Conference champion; x – Division champion/co-champions; Rankings from AP Poll

The 2002 Marshall Thundering Herd football team represented Marshall University in the 2002 NCAA Division I-A football season. The Thundering Herd played their home games at Marshall University Stadium in Huntington, West Virginia, and competed in the East Division of the Mid-American Conference (MAC). The team was coached by seventh-year head coach Bob Pruett. Marshall won its fifth MAC title in six years and its fifth consecutive bowl game.

== Schedule ==
Date	Time	Opponent	Rank	Site	TV	Result	Attendance	Source
August 31	7:00 pm	No. 2 (I-AA) Appalachian State*	No. 19	Marshall University Stadium; Huntington, WV (rivalry)	ESPN Plus	W 50–17	31,042	
September 12	7:45 pm	at No. 11 Virginia Tech*	No. 16	Lane Stadium; Blacksburg, VA	ESPN	L 21–47	65,049	
September 20	7:00 pm	UCF		Marshall University Stadium; Huntington, WV	ESPN2	W 26–21	32,900	
October 5	2:00 pm	at Kent State		Dix Stadium; Kent, OH		W 42–21	15,337	
October 12	4:30 pm	Buffalo		Marshall University Stadium; Huntington, WV		W 66–21	28,200	
October 19	4:30 pm	Troy State*^{†}		Marshall University Stadium; Huntington, WV	ESPN Plus	W 24–7	27,121	
October 26	1:00 pm	at Central Michigan		Kelly/Shorts Stadium; Mount Pleasant, MI		W 23–18	14,564	
November 2	3:30 pm	at Akron		Rubber Bowl; Akron, OH		L 20–34	13,762	
November 12	8:00 pm	Miami (OH)		Marshall University Stadium; Huntington, WV	ESPN	W 36–34	26,851	
November 23	3:30 pm	at Ohio		Peden Stadium; Athens, OH (Battle for the Bell)		W 24–21	21,110	
November 30	4:30 pm	Ball State		Marshall University Stadium; Huntington, WV	ESPN2	W 38–14	23,824	
December 7	2:30 pm	Toledo		Marshall University Stadium; Huntington, WV (MAC Championship Game)	ESPN2	W 49–45	24,582	
December 18	8:00 pm	vs. Louisville*		Ladd–Peebles Stadium; Mobile, AL (GMAC Bowl)	ESPN2	W 38–15	40,646	
*Non-conference game; ^{†}Homecoming; Rankings from AP Poll released prior to the game; All times are in Eastern time

== Game summaries ==
=== Appalachian State ===
	1	2	3	4	Total
Mountaineers	7	3	7	0	17
No. 19 Thundering Herd	3	20	14	13	50

=== Virginia Tech ===
	1	2	3	4	Total
No. 16 Thundering Herd	0	0	0	21	21
No. 11 Hokies	10	10	6	21	47

=== UCF ===
	1	2	3	4	Total
Golden Knights	7	7	0	7	21
Thundering Herd	3	17	6	0	26

=== Kent State ===
	1	2	3	4	Total
Thundering Herd	7	14	14	7	42
Golden Flashes	14	0	7	0	21

=== Buffalo ===
	1	2	3	4	Total
Bulls	0	0	7	14	21
Thundering Herd	21	31	7	7	66

=== Troy State ===
	1	2	3	4	Total
Trojans	0	0	0	7	7
Thundering Herd	10	7	0	7	24

=== Central Michigan ===
	1	2	3	4	Total
Thundering Herd	13	7	3	0	23
Chippewas	0	9	3	6	18

=== Akron ===
	1	2	3	4	Total
Thundering Herd	7	3	7	3	20
Zips	7	17	10	0	34

=== Miami (OH) ===
	1	2	3	4	Total
RedHawks	3	14	10	7	34
Thundering Herd	10	7	12	7	36

=== Ohio ===
	1	2	3	4	Total
Thundering Herd	0	3	14	7	24
Bobcats	7	0	6	8	21

=== Ball State ===
	1	2	3	4	Total
Cardinals	7	0	0	7	14
Thundering Herd	10	14	14	0	38

=== Toledo ===
	1	2	3	4	Total
Rockets	0	17	15	13	45
Thundering Herd	14	14	7	14	49

=== Louisville ===
	1	2	3	4	Total
Cardinals	0	7	0	8	15
Thundering Herd	7	10	7	14	38

== Roster ==
2002 Marshall Thundering Herd football team roster
Players
Coaches
Offense

Pos.	#	Name	Class
WR	87	Oscar Alcantara	Sr
WR	83	Brad Bates	So
OL	77	Josh Blakey	So
OL	56	Toby Bullock	Fr
RB	8	Bradon Carey	Jr
WR	82	Josh Davis	So
QB	4	Stan Hill	So
WR	80	Curtis Jones	Sr
QB	7	Byron Leftwich	Sr
TE	90	Jason Rader	Jr
G	75	Steve Sciullo	Sr
WR	40	Darius Watts	Jr

Defense

Pos.	#	Name	Class
DB	3	Moriah Anderson	So
LB	5	Kevin Atkins	So
LB	1	Gladstone Coke	Jr
FS	19	Chris Crocker	Sr
DE	50	Johnathan Goddard	So
DE	99	Jamus Martin	So
DE	55	Maurice McKinney	Jr
LB	53	Ashley McNeely	Fr
LB	42	Ryan Kobbe	Sr
LB	47	Henry Moore	Sr
LB	44	Carlos Morgan	So
DB	15	Yancey Satterwhite	Sr
LB	12	Scott Wilks	Fr
DB	28	Renaldo Williams	So
LB	33	Dionte' Wilson	So

Special teams

Pos.	#	Name	Class
K	9	Jesse Cortez	Fr
P/K	36	Curtis Head	Sr
K	16	Nick Kelly	So
LS	68	Cory Dennison	Sr

Head coach

- Bob Pruett

Coordinators/assistant coaches

- Lou Anarumo
  (Defensive backs)

Legend

- (C) Team captain
- (S) Suspended
- (I) Ineligible
- Injured
- Redshirt

Roster
Last update: 2002-10-22

== Team players drafted in the NFL ==
The following players were selected in the 2003 NFL draft.

Player	Position	Round	Pick	Franchise
Byron Leftwich	Quarterback	1	7	Jacksonville Jaguars
Chris Crocker	Defensive Back	3	84	Cleveland Browns
Steve Sciullo	Guard	4	122	Indianapolis Colts

== Rankings ==
Ranking movements Legend: ██ Increase in ranking ██ Decrease in ranking — = Not ranked RV = Received votes
	Week																	
Poll	Pre	1	2	3	4	5	6	7	8	9	10	11	12	13	14	15	16	Final
AP	19	19	16	16	RV	RV	RV	RV	RV	RV	RV	RV	RV	RV	RV	RV	RV	24
Coaches	21	22	18	17	RV	RV	RV	RV	RV	RV	25	RV	RV	RV	RV	RV	24	19
BCS	Not released									—	—	—	—	—	—	—	—	Not released
