= Bill Bleil =

American football player and coach (born 1959)

Current position
- Title: Offensive line coach
- Team: Pittsburg State
- Conference: MIAA

Biographical details
- Born: February 23, 1959 (age 67); Remsen, Iowa, U.S.
- Education: New Mexico Highlands University

Playing career
- 1977–1980: Northwestern (IA)
- Position: Linebacker

Coaching career (HC unless noted)
- 1981–1982: New Mexico Highlands (GA)
- 1983: New Mexico Highlands (DC)
- 1984: Dana (DC)
- 1985–1987: Eastern New Mexico (OL)
- 1988–1989: Eastern New Mexico (OC)
- 1990–1991: Northwestern (OL)
- 1992: Pacific (CA) (OL)
- 1993–1995: Pacific (CA) (OC)
- 1996: Western Carolina (OC/OL)
- 1997–2001: Western Carolina
- 2002: South Dakota (OC)
- 2003: Northern Illinois (TE)
- 2004: Pittsburgh (TE/OT)
- 2005–2006: Akron (RB)
- 2007–2008: Akron (TE/OT)
- 2009–2012: Iowa State (AHC/OL)
- 2013: Iowa State (AHC/TE)
- 2014–2015: Rhode Island (OC/OL)
- 2016–2017: Missouri Southern (AHC/OL)
- 2018: Lamar (OL)
- 2019: Lamar (co-OC/OL)
- 2020–2021: Mary Hardin–Baylor (OL)
- 2022–2023: Stephen F. Austin (OL)
- 2024–present: Pittsburg State (OL)

Head coaching record
- Overall: 23–32

Accomplishments and honors

Awards
- SoCon Coach of the Year (2001)

Bill Bleil (born February 23, 1959) is an American college football coach and former player. He is the offensive line coach for the Pittsburg State University, a position he has held since 2024. He played college football at Northwestern (IA) and has also coached the New Mexico Highlands, Dana, Eastern New Mexico, Northwestern University, Pacific (CA), Western Carolina, South Dakota, Northern Illinois, Pittsburgh, Akron, Iowa State, Rhode Island, Missouri Southern, Lamar, Mary Hardin–Baylor, and Stephen F. Austin.

== Early life and education ==
Bleil was born on February 23, 1959, in Remsen, Iowa, and grew up there on his father's farm. He attended Remsen-Union High School, where he was an all-star at the tailback and defensive back positions. He played college football at Northwestern College from 1977 to 1980, earning two NAIA all-district honors while playing linebacker. He graduated in 1981 with a Bachelor of Arts degree in physical education. He earned a master's degree from New Mexico Highlands University in 1982.

== Coaching career ==
From 1981 to 1982, Bleil served as a graduate assistant and part-time volunteer at New Mexico Highlands University. He was named a full-time assistant in 1983, serving as defensive coordinator. For a single season in 1984, Bleil was the defensive coordinator of the Dana Vikings in Iowa.

Bleil was named offensive line coach at Eastern New Mexico University in 1985, serving three seasons in that position before being promoted to offensive coordinator in 1988. He left the school following the 1989 season. Eastern New Mexico ranked top 25 in the NCAA Division II in four of his five seasons with the school.

In 1990, Bleil was named offensive line coach at Northwestern University, where he served two seasons.

Bleil was named offensive line coach of Division I Pacific University in 1992, serving in that position for one year before being promoted to offensive coordinator in 1993.

In 1996, after Pacific discontinued their football program, Bleil was named offensive coordinator as well as offensive line coach at Western Carolina University. He was promoted to head coach following the firing of Steve Hodgin, who had hired Bleil one year earlier. In his head coaching debut, Western Carolina lost to Liberty in the season opener. After a 3–8 record that year, Bleil rebounded in 1998 with a 6–5 mark, the first winning season for the school since 1994.

Despite high expectations, Bleil's 1999 Western Carolina team finished with just three wins after being heavily injured. The school compiled a 4–7 record in 2000. He led them to a 7–4 record in 2001, being named conference coach of the year, but was fired by the school, leading to the outrage of many of the team's fans.

After being fired by Western Carolina, Bleil accepted a position with the South Dakota Coyotes as offensive coordinator. He was named tight ends coach at Northern Illinois University in 2003. He left them after one season and was subsequently hired by the University of Pittsburgh to coach the tight ends and offensive line.

In 2005, Bleil was hired by Akron University as running backs coach. In his first year with the school, he helped running back Brett Biggs earn second-team all-conference honors with over 1,200 rushing yards. His position was changed in 2007 to offensive tackles coach and tight ends coach.

Bleil was named assistant head coach and offensive line coach at Iowa State University at the end of 2008. After four seasons in that position, he gave up his offensive line duties for the tight ends while retaining his role as assistant head coach. While coaching the offensive line, five of his players made it into the National Football League (NFL).

Bleil left for Rhode Island in 2014 to be offensive coordinator and offensive line coach. He held that role for two seasons before leaving for Missouri Southern in 2016. He spent two years with Missouri Southern before accepting a position at Lamar to coach the offensive line in 2018. He was promoted to co-offensive coordinator in 2019 while retaining his role of offensive line coach.

From 2020 to 2021, Bleil was an assistant coach at the University of Mary Hardin–Baylor. In January 2022, he was named offensive line coach at Stephen F. Austin University.

In 2024, Bleil was hired as the offensive line coach for Pittsburg State University.

== Personal life ==
Bleil is married to Laurel Tjernagel of Roland, Iowa. They have two children.

Bleil's brother, Fred, was also a coach for several college teams until his death in 2011. The two brothers faced off against each other in a 2006 game between Akron and North Texas.

== Head coaching record ==
Year	Team	Overall	Conference	Standing	Bowl/playoffs
Western Carolina Catamounts (Southern Conference) (1997–2001)
1997	Western Carolina	3–8	3–5	7th	
1998	Western Carolina	6–5	5–3	3rd	
1999	Western Carolina	3–8	2–6	7th	
2000	Western Carolina	4–7	3–5	7th	
2001	Western Carolina	7–4	5–3	4th	
Western Carolina:		23–32	18–22		
Total:		23–32			
