= Fred Bleil =

American football coach (1949–2011)

Biographical details
- Born: January 7, 1949; Cherokee, Iowa, U.S.
- Died: September 26, 2011 (aged 62); Houston, Texas, U.S.

Playing career
- 1967: Northern Iowa

Coaching career (HC unless noted)
- 1972: Fort Lewis (assistant)
- 1973–1977: Eastern New Mexico (assistant)
- 1978: New Mexico Highlands (DC)
- 1979–1982: New Mexico Highlands
- 1983: Texas A&I (DC)
- 1984–1985: Drake (DC/DB)
- 1986–1991: Utah State (AHC/DC)
- 1992–1995: New Mexico (DC)
- 1996–1997: North Texas (DC)
- 1998–2005: San Diego State (ST/DB)
- 2006: North Texas (DC)
- 2007: Tulane (ST/LB)
- 2008–2010: Texas State (co-DC/S)

Administrative career (AD unless noted)
- 1979–1982: New Mexico Highlands

Head coaching record
- Overall: 16–26–1

Accomplishments and honors

Championships
- 1 RMAC (1981)

Fred H. Bleil (January 7, 1949 – September 26, 2011) was an American college football coach and athletics administrator. He served as the head football coach at New Mexico Highlands University from 1979 to 1982.

Bleil was born on January 7, 1949, in Cherokee, Iowa, to Robert and Mary (McElrath) Bliel. He was raised in Plymouth County, Iowa, graduating from Remsen-Union High School in Remsen, Iowa. Bliel earned a bachelor's degree from Westmar College—later known as Westmar University—in Le Mars, Iowa and a master's degree from Eastern New Mexico University. He began his coaching career in 1972 at an assistant coach at Fort Lewis College in Durango, Colorado. From 1973 to 1977, he was an assistant coach at Eastern New Mexico before being hired as the defensive coordinator at New Mexico Highlands in 1978 under head coach Dan Antolik. A year later, Bleil succeeded Antolik as head football coach. He also served as the athletic director at New Mexico Highlands for four years, from 1979 to 1982.

Bleil died of cancer, on September 26, 2011, at MD Anderson Cancer Center in Houston. His younger brother, Bill, is also a college football coach.

== Head coaching record ==
=== College ===
Year	Team	Overall	Conference	Standing	Bowl/playoffs	NAIA^{#}
New Mexico Highlands Cowboys (Rocky Mountain Athletic Conference) (1979–1982)
1979	New Mexico Highlands	3–7	3–5	T–6th		
1980	New Mexico Highlands	4–6	3–5	T–5th		
1981	New Mexico Highlands	7–3	7–1	1st		19
1982	New Mexico Highlands	2–7–1	1–6–1	8th		
New Mexico Highlands:		16–26–1	14–17–1			
Total:		16–26–1				
National championship Conference title Conference division title or championship game berth
^{#}Rankings from final NAIA Division I poll.
