= Mike Torrez =

American baseball player (born 1946)

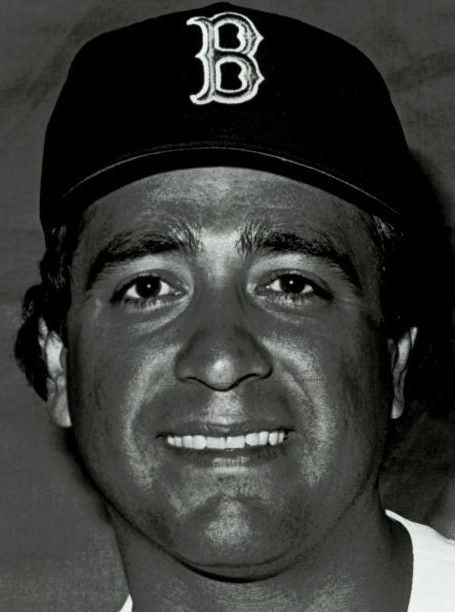
- Pitcher
- Born: August 28, 1946 (age 80); Topeka, Kansas, U.S.
- Batted: Right Threw: Right

MLB debut
- September 10, 1967, for the St. Louis Cardinals

Last MLB appearance
- July 27, 1984, for the Oakland Athletics

MLB statistics
- Win–loss record: 185–160
- Earned run average: 3.96
- Strikeouts: 1,404
- Stats at Baseball Reference

Teams
- St. Louis Cardinals (1967–1971); Montreal Expos (1971–1974); Baltimore Orioles (1975); Oakland Athletics (1976–1977); New York Yankees (1977); Boston Red Sox (1978–1982); New York Mets (1983–1984); Oakland Athletics (1984)

Career highlights and awards
- World Series champion (1977)

Michael Augustine Torrez (born August 28, 1946) is an American former Major League Baseball (MLB) starting pitcher. In an 18-season career, he pitched for the St. Louis Cardinals (1967–1971), Montreal Expos (1971–1974), Baltimore Orioles (1975), Oakland Athletics (1976–1977, 1984), New York Yankees (1977), Boston Red Sox (1978–1982), and New York Mets (1983–1984). As a member of the Yankees, he won two games of the 1977 World Series over the Los Angeles Dodgers. He batted and threw right-handed.

A native of Topeka, Kansas, Torrez was signed by the Cardinals in 1964. He made his MLB debut with them in 1967 and became a full-time major leaguer in 1969, winning nine of his final 10 starts that year. He had a 10–4 record in 1969 but an 8–10 record in 1970 before getting traded to the Expos during the 1971 season. After pitching one game for Montreal that year, Torrez spent the next three seasons with the ballclub, winning 16 games in 1972 and 15 games in 1974. Traded to the Orioles for 1975, he won 20 games for the only time in his career, posting a .690 winning percentage. The Orioles sent him to Oakland for 1976 as part of the Reggie Jackson trade; Torrez won 16 games for Oakland in 1976 before getting traded to the Yankees in April 1977. He reached the playoffs for the only time in his career that year, winning two World Series games as the Yankees defeated the Dodgers in six games.

After the World Series, Torrez signed a seven-year, $2.5 million contract with the rival Boston Red Sox and helped them contend for the American League (AL) East title all season. Boston and New York finished the season with identical records, and Torrez pitched the tie-breaker game to determine the winner. He allowed a pivotal home run to Bucky Dent of the Yankees, and though he was initially cheered by Red Sox fans as he left the game, he would soon become a scapegoat for a frustrated fan base. He pitched for Boston for four more seasons, winning 16 games in 1979 and finishing second in the AL in winning percentage in 1981. After the 1982 season, he was traded to the Mets, with whom he served as a mentor for New York's young pitchers. He was released in 1984 and pitched two games with Oakland that year before finishing his career in the minor leagues in 1985.

== Early years ==
Torrez was born on August 28, 1946, in Topeka, Kansas, the descendant of Mexican immigrants who had come to the United States to work for the Atchison, Topeka, and Santa Fe Railroad. He was the fifth of eight children of Juan and Mary Torrez, who lived in the Oakland neighborhood of Topeka, Kansas. His father, who worked for the railroad, also coached local Cosmopolitan and Little League teams, winning city championships as their manager. At Topeka High School, Mike played basketball but not baseball; the sport was dropped by the school in the late 1950s because it conflicted with the track schedule. He played American Legion Baseball for three years, posting a 13–1 record for the Van-Ts in his final year. He was named to the Eastern Kansas All-Star team and, in his final American Legion game, struck out 18 when he faced the Nebraska All-Star team. Marion McDonald, a scout for the St. Louis Cardinals, became interested in Torrez after seeing him pitch in Lawrence. Torrez also attended a tryout with the Detroit Tigers, who were so impressed with him that they later offered him a $75,000 contract–but their offer was too late. Shortly after his eighteenth birthday, Torrez signed for $20,000 with the Cardinals as an amateur free agent on September 10, 1964.

== St. Louis Cardinals ==
=== First professional seasons (1964–1966) ===
Upon signing with the Cardinals, Torrez was assigned to an instructional camp in Hollywood, Florida, for two weeks. He then appeared in nine games (five starts) for the Cardinals' affiliate in the Florida East Coast Instructional League. In 1965, he pitched for the Raleigh Cardinals of the Single-A Carolina League. Torrez had some highlights during the year, such as a game against the Winston-Salem Red Sox where he retired 15 batters in a row. However, he and the team struggled, and he finished the season with a 4–8 record, a 4.79 earned run average (ERA), 81 strikeouts, and 75 walks in 94 innings pitched. He pitched for the Single-A Rock Hill Cardinals of the Western Carolina League in 1966. One day, against the Salisbury Astros, he won two games, finishing a contest that had been suspended and pitching 7 2/3 innings in the second game. He made the league All-Star team, posting a 7–4 record, a 2.50 ERA, and only 37 walks in 90 innings. This earned him a promotion to the Double-A Arkansas Travelers, who would win the Texas League championship in 1966. At the higher level, Torrez was inconsistent, posting a 3–9 record and walking 42 batters in 79 innings. However, his ERA with Arkansas was 2.62.

=== Brief action in the majors (1967–1968) ===
Just 20 years old in 1967, Torrez thought he had a chance to make St. Louis's Opening Day roster. "If they go by how everybody is pitching, I'd have a pretty good chance right now. Everything has been going real good so far. I've been throwing strikes. And getting the ball where I want it...keeping it down." He failed to make the roster but joined the Tulsa Oilers of the Triple-A Pacific Coast League (PCL). In the first half of the season, he walked too many batters, posting a 3–8 record. Then, though, Torrez won six games in a row. On July 28, he threw a shutout in a 1–0 victory over the Oklahoma City 89ers, and he held the Hawaii Islanders to three hits on August 9. Following the Oklahoma City game, Fred McAlister, the Cardinals' assistant minor league director, proclaimed "Torrez can pitch in any league, including the National [League] (NL), the way he pitched against the 89ers."

Torrez got his first chance to pitch in the NL in September, when he was called up by the Cardinals on the 10th of the month. In his major league debut the next day, he faced just one batter, Donn Clendenon, and struck him out. He made his first career start on September 22 and exited the game after five innings with a 2-1 lead, but he took a no decision as the bullpen was unable to hold the lead. In his third, and final, appearance of the season, he entered a tie ballgame with the Chicago Cubs with one out in the ninth inning. He struck out the first batter he faced, then gave up a double and a run scoring base hit for his first career loss. The Cardinals won the 1967 World Series, but Torrez was not on their roster for it because he was promoted too late in the season. Following the season, he pitched 106 innings for Licey in the Dominican Republic. Since he had been born and raised in the United States, he spoke little Spanish, which surprised people who assumed that he did because of his last name. During an interview with a Spanish radio station, "The guy asked me in Spanish how tall I was, and I told him 220 pounds. It really cracked him up."

Along with Johnny Bench, Cisco Carlos, Alan Foster and Don Pepper, Torrez was featured on the March 11, 1968 Sports Illustrated cover, which featured the magazine's picks for the rookies with the highest potential heading into the 1968 season. Though the Cardinals were rich in pitching, with a rotation that included Bob Gibson and Steve Carlton, Torrez made the roster out of spring training. He earned his first career win in a start against the Cubs on April 19, giving up two runs in 5 2/3 innings. After a second win on May 4, he would not make another appearance for 21 days, due to strong performances by the Cardinals starters. His ERA at this point was 2.60, but after he walked three batters in 1 2/3 innings on May 26, he was sent to Tulsa for the rest of the season. The Cardinals' general manager, Bing Devine, explained that the move was to get Torrez more work: "Anybody is going to suffer when he hasn't worked in 18 games or so. I know he would rather start than relieve." At the time, Torrez had a 2-1 record with a 2.84 ERA in five major league appearances. He had an 8-2 record and a 3.24 ERA to lead the Oilers to a 95-53 record, best in the Pacific Coast League. After finishing last in the Pacific Coast League the year before, Tulsa defeated the Spokane Indians in seven games to win the league championship. He again continued to pitch after the season, as he joined St. Louis for a month-long exhibition tour of Japan.

=== Full-time major leaguer (1969–1971) ===
In 1969, Torrez competed with several other pitchers for the role of fifth starter in the Cardinals' rotation. Though he did not get the role, he made the club as a relief pitcher. He was 1-0 with a 3.09 ERA in his first six appearances of the year when he was added to the starting rotation on May 24. In his first five starts, he went 0-4 with a 4.74 ERA, walking too many hitters. Towards the end of June, his pitching improved, and he had a 4–4 record at the All-Star break. As a matter of fact, he would not lose another game all season. In his final ten starts, Torrez would go 9-0 with a 2.57 ERA. Overall, he had a 10-4 record with a 3.59 ERA. Improved control aided Torrez, who also credited Gibson as his mentor: "I've learned so much from him on the bench, especially on how to pitch certain hitters. Gibby reminds me I've got to get ahead of the hitters...and when they guess, they lean in on pitches instead of sitting back and waiting." The Baseball Writers' Association of America's St. Louis chapter named him its co-Rookie of the Year along with Chuck Taylor. He again pitched for Licey after the year, posting a sub-3.00 ERA and winning two playoff games.

His strong second-half performance earned Torrez a raise before the start of the 1970 season. In his second start of the year, Torrez took a no-hitter into the eighth inning against the Montreal Expos. Adolfo Phillips led off the eighth with a single, but that would be the only hit allowed by Torrez, who himself went 3-for-3 with a run batted in and two runs scored in St. Louis's 10–0 win. It was the first shutout of his career and his eleventh victory in a row.

Torrez was 5-6 with a 3.02 ERA as he headed into his June 20, 1970 start against the Cubs. He retired the first batter he faced (Don Kessinger), then could not retire a second. He faced seven more batters, walking four (one with the bases loaded), giving up two singles and a triple, uncorking one wild pitch and allowing six earned runs. He would suffer a similar fate on July 2 against the Expos. In that start, he retired two batters, but still did not escape the first inning. He hit one batter, walked three (one intentionally), gave up two singles and a grand slam to John Bateman for six earned runs. After his 10–4 effort the previous year, he went 8-10 with a 4.22 ERA, striking out 100 but issuing 103 walks in 179 1/3 innings pitched.

During St. Louis's opening series of 1971, against the Cubs, Torrez cut his hand on a broken water glass, requiring three stitches. The injury caused him to alter his throwing motion, and he developed a sore arm. He lost his starting spot at the end of April and was relegated to a middle relief role until the end of June, when he made two more starts, neither of which was impressive. Facing the Pittsburgh Pirates on June 12, Torrez lasted just two plus innings, and walked five batters. On June 15, he was traded to the Expos for relief pitcher Bob Reynolds. Reporter Neal Russo blamed his control problems as the reason St. Louis gave up on him. In nine games (six starts) for St. Louis, Torrez had gone 1–2 with a 6.00 ERA, walking 30 batters in 36 innings.

== Montreal Expos ==
Upon his acquisition, the Expos assigned Torrez to the Winnipeg Whips, the worst team in the Triple-A International League. He won his first two starts with the team but never won again all season for a ballclub that would lose 17 of its final 74 games. His ERA was 8.16 in eighteen appearances, 11 of which were starts. Regardless, he received a September call up. Montreal manager Gene Mauch said, "I am not interested in the number of games we win this year, whether it's 81, 71, or 91. I'm concerned only with the development of players who will win a lot of games for me one of these years." Torrez's only appearance for his new club was against his old club on September 17, when he pitched three scoreless innings in a 7–2 defeat.

Prior to the 1972 season, the Expos made Torrez available on the trade market, but no other ballclubs were interested in him. Ultimately, Montreal decided to add him to their major league roster. After one relief appearance, Torrez was used as a starter by the Expos in 1972. His first two decisions were both one run complete game victories over the San Francisco Giants. The Expos endured a 1-12 stretch in May in which the only victory was Torrez's over the San Diego Padres. Facing the Cardinals on June 27, Torrez held his former team to three runs over seven innings, adding an RBI and scoring twice in the 11–3 victory. On July 19, he beat the Giants for a third time to head into the All-Star break with a 10-5 record and a 2.83 ERA. He would go 6-7 in the second half of the season to give him a team leading sixteen wins with a 3.33 ERA. He tied his career high with 103 walks, but these came in 243 1/3 innings, far and away the most of his career to that point. Ian McDonald, the English-language reporter assigned to covering the Expos, said the pitcher had "bounced from the obscurity of a Triple-A has-been in 1971 to a 16-game major league winner."

Mauch was excited about Torrez's potential in 1973, stating that he "is capable of winning more [than 16 games]." Torrez himself predicted 23 wins, saying, "any time I go out to the mound I have a good chance of beating the other team." On Opening Day in 1973, he lost to the Cubs despite allowing just one earned run, and he would lose his next two starts before earning his first win on April 19 against the Philadelphia Phillies. An abundance of walks, coupled with fewer strikeouts, were his problem in the early part of the season. After having 10 wins at the 1972 All-Star break, Torrez had five at the break in 1973, to go along with nine losses. His record slipped to 5–11 after the break; an irritated Mauch threatened to "not pitch him again for the rest of the season." From August 5 through September 15, he had his best stretch of the season, winning four games and losing none while posting a 2.98 ERA. He ended the season with a 9-12 record and a 4.46 ERA. Though he only pitched 208 innings, he walked 115 batters, striking out just 90. Torrez also led the NL with 14 wild pitches.

Entering 1974, reporter Bob Dunn wrote, "A year ago, there was a question of whether another Expo right-hander, Mike Torrez, could win 20. Now, 20 is 10." Torrez won his first three decisions of 1974, lost his next three, but went 6–3 after that to post a 9–6 record at the All-Star break. This equaled his win total from the previous year, though his ERA was 4.29. Mauch was frustrated with his performance, knocking a postgame meal table over Torrez after one of his starts. In late August, Mauch did not start Torrez for over three weeks. However, in the second half of the season, he went 6–2 with a 2.56 ERA, including a four hit, one walk shutout of the Phillies on September 27. Larry Bowa of the Phillies raved about his performance: "I saw him when he was a rookie...and tonight's the best I've seen him pitch. I'm talking about location, and the variety of pitches." Torrez had a 15–8 record, a 3.57 ERA, 92 strikeouts, and 84 walks in 186 1/3 innings pitched in 1974. He and Ken Singleton were traded from the Expos to the Baltimore Orioles for Dave McNally, Rich Coggins and minor-league right-handed pitcher Bill Kirkpatrick at the Winter Meetings on December 4, 1974.

== Baltimore Orioles ==
With Baltimore, Torrez joined a team that was a perennial playoff contender. Frank Robinson, former Oriole and manager of the Cleveland Indians, said, "Torrez can win. He proved that last season, and he should do even better with a great Baltimore infield behind him." On May 14, 1975, he was 5-1 with four of his five victories being complete games, even as most of the Orioles were struggling to have their usual success. On June 24, during a game against the New York Yankees, Torrez had an altercation with Thurman Munson. Torrez hit Munson with a pitch in the first inning, gave up a single to him in the fourth, and threw a pitch up by his head in the sixth. When Munson came to bat in the eighth, umpire Nick Bremigan warned Torrez not to throw any more brushback pitches; this time, Torrez blew kisses to Munson. The benches cleared, but no punches were thrown; however, after Munson grounded out to end the at bat, he charged the pitcher's mound. Torrez said after the game, "I haven't been in this league that long, but apparently you try to pitch guys tight, they start hollering.... I can't change my pattern of pitching just because he's crying about it." He had a 10–5 record at the All-Star break, throwing a shutout against the Oakland Athletics in his last start before the break. The second half of the year went similarly for the pitcher, who won 10 games again while only losing four. He gave up just two runs in a complete game victory over the Royals on August 27, at Royals Stadium, the closest major league park to his hometown. On September 21, he pitched a two-hit shutout over the Milwaukee Brewers to become a twenty-game winner for the only time in his career.

Torrez and Oriole ace Jim Palmer were the best two pitchers for the Orioles in 1975. Pitching a career-high 270 2/3 innings, Torrez finished with a 20–9 record, a 3.06 ERA, and 119 strikeouts. He finished second in the American League (AL) in innings pitched and winning percentage (.690) and tied for fourth in wins. Torrez also led the American League with 133 walks, topping Nolan Ryan by one. He finished 16th in voting for the AL Most Valuable Player (MVP) Award. As McNally and the other players sent over by the Orioles did not perform well for Montreal, Expos sportscaster Jacques Doucet called the trade for McNally the Expos' most "lopsided." Wanting to improve their hitting for the 1976 season, however, the Orioles sought a power hitter. Just as 1976 spring training was wrapping up, Torrez, Don Baylor and Paul Mitchell were traded to the Oakland Athletics for Reggie Jackson, Ken Holtzman and minor-league right-handed pitcher Bill Van Bommel. "What must I do to stay with a team?" lamented Torrez.

== Oakland Athletics ==
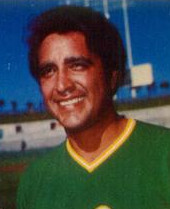
Torrez with the Oakland Athletics

Less than a week after his acquisition, Torrez got the opening day nod over Vida Blue with his new team. He pitched the A's to victory over the California Angels. Over his first six starts, he posted a 2.88 ERA and won three games, including one against the Orioles on April 30 when he outpitched Palmer in an 11–1 Oakland victory. A June 30 loss to the Texas Rangers brought his record to 6-9. From that point on, he was at his best for the rest of the year, helping the Athletics contend for the playoffs. On August 29, after Ron LeFlore used his speed to score a run for the Tigers in the first inning, Torrez pitched ten more innings of shutout ball. He left with the game tied at one in the 11th, but Oakland went on to prevail 2–1 in the 12th. Torrez followed this up with consecutive shutouts of the Angels, Chicago White Sox and Rangers from September 3 through 11. From the beginning of July through the remainder of the season, he went 10-3 with a 1.42 ERA. His strong play kept the Athletics close to the AL West-leading Royals, and owner Charlie Finley confidently stated, "They can put it up on a big sign in their clubhouse: 'Finley Says Kansas City Is Going to Choke.'" They failed to win the division, but Athletics reporter Ron Bergman stated, "The [failure] can't be blamed on Mike Torrez. He did his part, and more." His 2.50 ERA for the season trailed only Blue's 2.35 for the AL lead and would be his career best. Torrez also finished second to Blue with 266 1/3 innings pitched, posting a 16–12 record and striking out 115 while walking only 87.

Dissatisfied with the way Finley was cutting costs and trying to trade his star players, Torrez made it clear he would not resign with the club after 1977, when he would be eligible to be a free agent. Many of the Athletics received a 20-percent paycut for 1977, but Finley accidentally provided a 20-percent raise in the contract he sent to Torrez. Finley tried to get Torrez to reverse the deal by offering him instead a year's supply of his chili recipe, but Torrez signed the contract instead. Torrez was again an Opening Day winner for the Athletics in 1977, and won his first three starts before a 1 1/3 inning start against the White Sox on April 24 resulted in his first loss. Three days later, he was traded to the Yankees for Dock Ellis, Larry Murray and Marty Perez. With Oakland, he had gone 3–1 with a 4.44 ERA.

== New York Yankees ==
The Yankees had acquired Torrez after injuries to two of their best starters, Catfish Hunter and Don Gullett; Ellis, another starter, had been discontent with his salary, another factor that led to the trade. Torrez's first start with the Yankees came with some controversy; it was originally scheduled for April 29, but Torrez had not yet joined the team. His wife was in the hospital with serious medical issues following the birth of their first son, but there were rumors that Torrez was actually on an Arizona fishing trip with his agent, Gary Walker. He had indeed been with his wife, and he joined the club on May 3, holding the Angels to one run and earning the win in an 8–1 victory. He also won his second start with the team, then saw mixed results thereafter. He was 8–6 with a 4.57 ERA on June 25 before losing four decisions in a row and seeing his ERA climb to 4.99. Thinking he needed more work to be successful, he convinced manager Billy Martin to let him pitch every fourth day. Starting July 27, he had a seven-game winning streak, all complete games in which he maintained a 1.57 ERA. The last game of this streak came on August 23 against the White Sox. The win capped a six-day span in which the Yankees moved from five games behind the Boston Red Sox into first place in the American League East. In a September 3 interview, Torrez said, "I'd like to stay here, I really would. I've been on four teams in the last four years and I'd like to stay in one place, maybe finish out my career here." He limited the Toronto Blue Jays to three hits on September 9 in a 2–0 shutout. With the Yankees, Torrez had a 14–12 record a 3.81 ERA, 90 strikeouts, and 75 walks. His 217 innings pitched were second to Ed Figueroa's 239 1/3, even though Torrez did not start the season with New York. His combined numbers between Oakland and New York were a 17–13 record, a 3.88 ERA, 102 strikeouts, and 86 walks in 243 1/3 innings pitched. Torrez reached the playoffs for the first time in his career as New York won the division.

=== 1977 ALCS ===
The AL Championship Series was a rematch of the previous year's, pitting the Yankees against the Royals. After two games in New York, the remaining three were played in Kansas City, which enabled Torrez to pitch in front of many family members and friends from Topeka. He started Game 3 but took the loss, allowing five runs over 5 1/3 innings in an eventual 6–2 defeat. That was his only start of the series, but he played an important part in Game 5. Ron Guidry, one of New York's best pitchers, had struggled with his command, and Torrez relieved him with one out in the third inning, a runner on first base, and the Royals leading 3-1. He struck out both batters he faced in the third, then pitched 4 2/3 more scoreless innings before handing the ball to closer Sparky Lyle. The Yankees scored one in the eighth and three more in the ninth for the 5-3 victory that sent them to the World Series against the Los Angeles Dodgers. Iber wrote, "While he did not get credit for the victory, Mike Torrez contributed mightily by holding the Royals scoreless and gave his team a chance to win."

=== 1977 World Series ===
Torrez made his first World Series start in Game 3, with the series tied at one game apiece. At Dodger Stadium, Mickey Rivers led the game off with a double, and the Yankees jumped all over Dodgers starter Tommy John in the first inning to hand Torrez a three-run lead as he took the mound. After he escaped jams in the first two innings, Dusty Baker took Torrez deep to left field for a three-run home run to tie the game in the third. "I should have gone with my best pitch, the fast ball, but I threw him a slider and it stayed out over the plate," Torrez summarized the home run. However, the Yankees scored another run in the fourth, and one in the fifth to take a 5–3 lead. Meanwhile, Torrez would go the rest of the way, and only allow three more base runners, striking out the last two batters of the game.

With the Yankees up three games to two, Torrez returned to the mound for the Game 6 start. The Dodgers were winning 3-2 when Reggie Jackson began hitting every pitch he saw for a home run in the fourth inning. By the end of the eighth, he had homered on three straight pitches thrown to him, and the Yankees had scored eight runs. Meanwhile, on the mound for the Yankees, Torrez held the Dodgers to one earned run and three overall until there were two outs in the ninth, when Vic Davalillo had an RBI single to score a fourth run for the Dodgers. The next batter, Lee Lacy hit a pop-up bunt to Torrez for the final out, and the Yankees were World Series champions. In his two complete games for the Yankees, Torrez struck out fifteen while only walking five.

== Boston Red Sox ==
=== 163-game 1978 season ===
Just after the World Series, Torrez became a free agent, thanks to the Seitz decision in 1975 that had overruled baseball's reserve clause. Seeking a big payday, Torrez jumped sides in the Red Sox–Yankees rivalry, receiving a seven-year contract worth $2.5 million from Boston. The Red Sox had finished 97-64 in 1977 and hoped that adding Torrez and Dennis Eckersley (acquired in a trade with the Cleveland Indians) to a pitching staff that had a 4.11 ERA in 1977 would enable them to win the division instead of finishing 2 1/2 games behind the Yankees, as they had in 1977. After losing his first start for Boston, Torrez won five of six decisions between April 12 and May 13. Then, after losing on May 19, he won five straight decisions through June 15, helping Boston go six games up on the Yankees on that date. Torrez had an 11–4 record at the All-Star break but was not selected to the game; Martin, the AL manager, did not select a single Red Sox pitcher. On August 13, Torrez pitched a ten-inning complete game victory over the Milwaukee Brewers. It improved Torrez's record to 14-6, and put the Sox nine games up on the Yankees.

Torrez also won his next start before going into a slide. From August 23 through September 24, he went 0-6 with a 4.98 ERA, including two losses to the Yankees. Meanwhile, the Red Sox let a division lead that was as high as 10 games on July 6 completely vanish. Boston was up four games on the Yankees when New York came to Fenway for a four-game series from September 7 through September 10. Torrez pitched the first game; he lasted just a little over an inning, as the Yankees scored five runs against him and won 15–3. By the time the Yankees left Boston, the teams were tied for first.

The Yankees were 1 1/2 games up when it was their turn to host the Red Sox from September 15 through September 17. Torrez pitched the second game; the Yankees countered with Hunter. After allowing a first inning two-run home run to eventual AL MVP Jim Rice, Hunter held the Red Sox scoreless the rest of the way. Torrez allowed a run in the first and a run in the fifth, and the game was tied at two heading to the ninth. After Boston failed to score in the top of the inning, Mickey Rivers led off the bottom of the ninth with a triple, then scored the winning run for New York on Thurman Munson's sacrifice fly.

The Red Sox went 12-2 over their final fourteen games. Among them was a great outing by Torrez on September 28. He pitched a three-hit shutout against the Tigers, his 16th win of the season. Boston and the Yankees concluded their 162-game schedules with identical 99-63 records, forcing the first tiebreaker playoff game in the AL since 1948.

==== The Bucky Dent home run ====
The Red Sox won a coin toss to host the tie-breaker, which pitted Torrez against eventual Cy Young Award winner Guidry, who was pitching on only three days' rest. Future Hall of Famer Carl Yastrzemski led off the second inning with a home run to give the Sox the early 1-0 lead. Boston scored again in the sixth. Through six innings, Torrez allowed just two hits and two walks.

With one out in the seventh, Chris Chambliss and Roy White singled. Jim Spencer, pinch hitting for rookie second baseman Brian Doyle, popped out to left for the second out. That brought number nine hitter Bucky Dent, a shortstop with only four home runs all season, to the plate. Dent fouled a 1-and-1 pitch off his left leg, and went to the dugout for treatment and a new bat, as the one he had was cracked. When he returned to the plate, Torrez threw him a fastball that Dent hit over the "Green Monster." It was Dent's first home run since August 16.

The Yankees would increase their lead to 5-2. An eighth-inning rally cut the deficit to 5-4. With the tying run on third base in the ninth and two outs, Yastrzemski popped out to Graig Nettles in foul territory to end the game. His first season in Boston, Torrez went 16-13 with a 3.96 ERA. Against the Yankees, he was 1-4 with a 5.96 ERA. Regardless of any other shortcomings that led to Boston's collapse in the 1978 season, Torrez's pitch to Dent epitomized the "Curse of the Bambino" in the minds of Red Sox fans. Though Torrez received applause from the Red Sox fans when he left the game, he soon became the scapegoat for a frustrated fan base.

=== 1979-82 ===
It took Torrez nearly three weeks to win his first game in 1979, but on April 22, he held Kansas City to four hits in a complete game shutout. That was the first of three straight complete games, all of which he won. Against the Yankees on June 29, he had a shutout going into the ninth inning, but an error by Butch Hobson in the bottom of the inning allowed the Yankees to score two unearned runs and tie the game. Torrez was removed that inning and did not get credit for the victory, but Boston ultimately prevailed 3–2 in the 13th inning. With a 9–5 record at the All-Star break, there was a possibility that Torrez could win 20 games. "I've always been a strong finisher, except for last year," Torrez noted, looking forward to the second half. "I feel good right now, and it's nice to know the manager [ Don Zimmer ] has the confidence to send me out there every fifth day. He believes in me and I appreciate that." After a loss in his first game following the break, Torrez reeled off four straight wins, including a six-hitter against the Brewers on August 2 that the Red Sox won 10–1. From August 11 through September 23, however, he posted a 6.20 ERA, winning once while losing six games. Over his final three starts of the season, Torrez won twice, losing a game to the Tigers in which he pitched 10 innings and surrendered just two earned runs. Torrez matched his 16-13 record from the previous season despite leading the league in walks (121) and earned runs (126, which gave him a 4.49 ERA). The Sox finished two games ahead of the Yankees but failed to make the playoffs, finishing third behind the Orioles and Brewers.

An injury caused Torrez to miss 10 games in 1980 spring training, but he was ready in time for the beginning of the season. It took him until May 21, and he posted a 4.47 ERA over this time period. Two difficult losses early in the year came against the Brewers, an 18–1 defeat on April 12 and a 19–8 loss on May 31. By the All-Star break, he had a 4–8 record and a 4.71 ERA. During one loss, after he had been removed from the game but while the game was still going on, Torrez left the stadium, causing his manager to declare, "There'll be no more duckouts. When I make a mistake, I have to stay here and face the music. From now on, they're going to have to face the music too." On July 18, he pitched 10 shutout innings against the Minnesota Twins, earning the victory when Dave Stapleton hit a walk-off home run in the bottom of the 10th. That was his only win in the month of July, however, and though he won all three of his August decisions, he was 9-14 with a 5.02 ERA by September 13. Zimmer removed him from the rotation after that start: "I'll say this for Torrez. He understood. I told him the reason he was being taken out of the rotation was that he simply hadn't done the job." He had become a frequent target of booing at Fenway Park, so much more that the other starters tried to work the schedule so that he would not have to pitch home games, according to Eckersley. He was ineffective in four relief appearances, going 0-2 with a 5.87 ERA. Torrez finished the season with a 9–16 record, a 5.08 ERA, 97 strikeouts, and 75 walks. He allowed 256 hits in 207 1/3 innings.

Through his first four games of 1981, Torrez had a 1–2 record and a 6.50 ERA. From May 8 to June 9, however, he went 5–0 with a 2.45 ERA. He rebounded nicely in the shortened 1981 season. On June 9, he allowed five hits and one run in a complete game victory over the Seattle Mariners. Teammate Yastrzemski saw improvement: "He's looking like the Torrez who won 20 games for Baltimore back in 1975. He's doing what he should have been doing the last couple of years, just throwing the fastball and challenging guys to hit it." The 1981 Major League Baseball strike interrupted the baseball season, and Torrez's next start would not come until August 11. In the second half, he went 4-1 with a 3.72 ERA. On September 29, he took a shutout into the ninth inning against the Brewers, allowing two runs and getting removed from the game that inning, but he was still credited with the win as Boston prevailed by a score of 7–2. Torrez had eight strikeouts in the victory. He finished the year with a 10–3 record, a 3.68 ERA, 54 strikeouts, and 51 walks. His .769 winning percentage was second in the league, behind Pete Vuckovich's .778. Over the winter, however, while attending a Boston Celtics game, Torrez was paged over the PA. As soon as the crowd heard the name, they began booing. Torrez suspected that the PA announcer called him on purpose to draw the boos, and he said that the Celtics apologized for the incident.

By 1982, Torrez was one of five active pitchers to beat every team in both leagues, along with Gaylord Perry, Fergie Jenkins, Doyle Alexander, and Tommy John. He posted a 2–1 record and a 3.33 ERA in April, including a four-hit complete game victory over the Rangers on April 30, but that would be his best portion of the season. By late May, his ERA had gone up to 6.65. Though he never lost more than two games in a row all season, he never won more than two games in a row. The pitcher blamed his inconsistency on too little concentration: "I know I should pitch the same way all the time, but I don't. I'm just stupid, but I have to start being a smart pitcher again and stay that way." Another highlight against the Rangers came on July 21 when, in the second game of a doubleheader, he struck out a season-high seven hitters over eight innings in a 6–1 victory. He finished the year 9-9 with a 5.23 ERA, striking out 84 and walking 74 in 175 2/3 innings pitched, his fewest innings in a non-strike-shortened year since 1971. Even before the World Series, the Red Sox had made him available for trade that offseason, and Torrez was traded to the New York Mets for a player to be named later on January 13, 1983. Since he had played in the major leagues for 10 years and with the same team for five, Torrez had to approve the transaction; wanting a better contract, he refused to agree to it until the Mets gave him a two-year contract for the same amount he had been earning annually, with incentives that would raise it if fulfilled. Mike Davis was eventually sent to Boston to complete the trade.

== New York Mets ==
Torrez joined returning Mets pitcher and future Hall of Famer Tom Seaver as part of a Mets rotation filled with young pitchers; he was expected to give experienced help and advice to Ed Lynch, Walt Terrell, Jesse Orosco, Tom Gorman, and Ron Darling, as well as Dwight Gooden once he reached the major leagues. Torrez was 2-6 with a 5.05 ERA in ten starts and three relief appearances when he took the mound against the Dodgers on June 2. Pitching for Los Angeles was Fernando Valenzuela, the young Dodger starter whose early success had caused a great deal of excitement, labelled "Fernandomania." The Mets were trailing 4-3 when Mets manager George Bamberger lifted Torrez for pinch hitter Mark Bradley in the ninth. Bradley hit his first career home run to send the game to extra innings. Reliever Jesse Orosco, who had three of the Mets' sixteen wins and saved an additional three, took his first loss of the season when the Dodgers scored a run in the 14th inning. Bamberger resigned after the game, saying "I've probably suffered enough."

Torrez lost his first two starts under new manager Frank Howard. In the first of those, he held the Cubs scoreless through eight, however, they scored twice in the ninth for the 2-1 victory on June 8. The next came five days later, also against the Cubs; poor defense accounted for three of the Cubs' seven runs in a 7–3 loss. On June 15, the Mets acquired perennial Gold Glove winner and first baseman Keith Hernandez from the Cardinals for pitchers Neil Allen and Rick Ownbey.

Although the Mets would lose 94 games and finish last in the NL East, they showed modest improvement under their new manager with first baseman Hernandez joining several young ballplayers that included Darryl Strawberry, the number one overall pick in the 1980 Major League Baseball draft. For his part, Torrez was 2-8 with a 4.48 ERA when Hernandez joined the team. Over the remainder of the season, he posted an 8-9 and a marginally lower ERA, at 4.30. On August 31, he squared off against Valenzuela a second time, holding the Dodgers to one run to earn a complete game victory. His 4.37 ERA was lower than it had been in three of the previous four seasons, but his 17 losses led the NL. Torrez also led the league in earned runs allowed (108) and walks (113), striking out just 94 batters.

Seaver was left unprotected in the free agent compensation pool and was signed by the White Sox on January 20, 1984, leaving Torrez the veteran of a young Mets rotation. New manager Davey Johnson chose the veteran to be his Opening Day starter on April 2. He lasted a little more than an inning, surrendering six earned runs to the Cincinnati Reds. In his second start of the season against the Houston Astros, Torrez hit young shortstop Dickie Thon in the head with a pitch, breaking the orbital bone over Thon's left eye. Thon missed the rest of the season because of impaired vision, and his ability never fully recovered.

Torrez had no wins entering the month of June. On June 3, he held the Cardinals to one earned run in eight innings, but the Mets scored no runs for him as they lost 1–0, dropping his record to 0–5. He would not have a win until June 9, when he defeated the Expos. Three days later, he made a relief appearance in the final inning of a game against the Pirates, allowing three hits, a run, and a walk, and boosting his ERA to 5.02 in what would be his last game as a Met. On June 15, the Mets acquired starter Bruce Berenyi in a trade, and they designated Torrez for assignment to make room for him on the roster the next day.

== Oakland Athletics and Miami Marlins (minor leagues) ==
Torrez was not unemployed for long, as he resigned with the Athletics on July 3. Initially, the team assigned him to the Triple-A Tacoma Tigers of the PCL, the first minor league team Torrez had pitched with since 1971. He made three starts for Tacoma, posting a 1–1 record and a 7.88 ERA, before he was promoted towards the end of July. He made two relief appearances with the Athletics but was ineffective, posting a 27.00 ERA before he was released on August 9. His final major league appearance was on July 27, in which he allowed two runs in 1 2/3 innings in a 12–2 loss to the Mariners. In 11 games (eight starts) between New York and Oakland, Torrez had gone 1–5 with a 6.30 ERA, walking 21 batters in 40 innings.

Not ready to retire, Torrez pitched for Licey following the 1984 major league season, helping the Dominican club win the Caribbean Series. In 1985, Torrez failed to get any offers from major league teams. Instead, he signed with the Miami Marlins, an unaffiliated Single-A team in the Florida State League that was hoping to improve its attendance by signing former major leaguers seeking a return to baseball's top level. "I'm going to give it a couple of months," he said of the decision to play with the team. "I'm swallowing a little of my pride, but everyone does at some point...I can help someone." Though his record was just 7-8, he had a 2.80 ERA for the team, but no major league team signed him, and he retired.

== Career stats ==
W	L	Pct	ERA	G	GS	CG	SHO	IP	H	ER	R	HR	BB	K	WP	HBP	BAA	Fld%	Avg.
185	160	.536	3.96	494	458	117	15	3043.2	3043	1340	1501	223	1371	1404	103	59	.264	.944	.155

== Coaching career ==
In 2009, Torrez became a pitching coach for the Newark Bears of the independent Atlantic League of Professional Baseball. His pitchers posted a 5.36 ERA that year, but Newark made it to the Atlantic League's championship round. The team managed only a 53–86 record in 2010, however, and switched to the Can–Am League for the 2011 season. New owner Thomas Cetnar named Torrez his General Manager for the 2011 campaign. The team was sold again midway through the season, and Torrez was fired in July over disputes about promotions the new owners wanted to hold, including a reality TV series. At the time he was dismissed, Torrez claimed he was owed $60,000; the salary dispute had still not been settled five years later.

== Pitching style ==
Torrez's fastball was his main pitch. He also threw a slider, which became a key complement to the fastball during the 1972 campaign. Hank Aaron said of it that year, "I don't recall seeing Torrez throw a slider in the years he was with St. Louis. He's came up with a good one." In 1980, he tried to be more of a breaking ball pitcher, but Houk encouraged him to return to throwing the fastball more consistently in 1981, as that was his strength. Six times during his career, he walked 100 or more batters, and three times he led the league in this statistic. In eight of his 18 years, he had more walks than strikeouts, though six of these were in his first nine seasons. Though Torrez ranks 130th all-time among major leaguers in innings pitched (3043 2/3), he ranks 23rd all-time with 1,371 walks. He is also 98th with 103 wild pitches.

== Personal life ==
In the middle of the 1969 season, during a Cardinals off day on May 8, Torrez married his first wife, Connie Reisinger. They had a daughter named Christiann, but their marriage fell apart, and the couple divorced in 1971. In 1974, he remarried to Montreal native Danielle Gagnon, a local model and celebrity. They had their first child, Iannick, in April 1977, while Torrez was still with the Athletics. That marriage would last until 1981, when the couple divorced. Danielle felt that, since coming to Boston, Torrez had been paying more attention to the game and less attention to her in a desire to prove himself worth the $2.5 million contract he had signed. In 1982, retired Boston Patriot Jim Boudreaux arranged a blind date for Torrez with Teresa Wilson, who worked as a flight attendant for American Airlines. They were married later that year, with Eckersley serving as best man at the wedding. He and Teresa had two sons, Michael and Wesley. Wesley is an Independent League pitcher.

After retiring, Torrez and his wife Teresa initially lived in the St. Petersburg area before moving north to Westchester County, New York, settling down a few blocks from former major league pitcher Ralph Branca. In New York, Torrez accepted a sales position with Contract Furnishing Systems. Eventually, he moved on to start his own company, MAT Premiums, which supplies clothing with custom logos for corporations. He and Teresa eventually moved to Illinois to be closer to her family in Ohio and his family in Kansas. Golf is a hobby of his.

The Michael A. Torrez Baseball Complex, a youth sports complex where Torrez once played PONY League baseball, was named after him in October 1988. Torrez is a member of the Kansas Sports Hall of Fame.

Torrez had a reputation for being a partier. In St. Louis, a reporter referred to him as a "knight of the neon." Singleton, his teammate at Montreal and Baltimore, recalled that Montreal was "a great party town," and Torrez took advantage of the nightlife. In Boston, he was a frequent visitor at nearby discos, a factor that led to his divorce from Danielle.
