= C. C. Poindexter =

C. C. Poindexter may refer to:

- C. C. Poindexter (academic) (1880-1913), American academic and fraternity founder
- C. C. Poindexter (coach) (1898-1958), American football and basketball coach
