= Miracle on the Mountain (disambiguation) =

Miracle on the Mountain may refer to:

- Miracle on the Mountain, a college basketball game played in 2002
- Miracle on the Mountain: The Kincaid Family Story, a 2000 American drama film
- 6 Below: Miracle on the Mountain, a 2017 American survival drama film
