= Western Carolina Catamounts football =

Football program representing Western Carolina University

2026 Western Carolina Catamounts football team
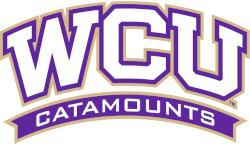
- First season: 1931; 95 years ago
- Athletic director: Alex Gary
- Head coach: Kerwin Bell; 6th season, 24–21 (.533)
- Location: Cullowhee, North Carolina
- Stadium: E. J. Whitmire Stadium (capacity: 13,742)
- Field: Bob Waters Field
- NCAA division: Division I FCS
- Conference: Southern
- Colors: Purple and gold
- All-time record: 341–502–23 (.407)
- Bowl record: 0–1–0 (.000)

Conference championships
- NSC: 1949
- Rivalries: Appalachian State (rivalry; dormant); East Tennessee State (rivalry); Furman University
- Fight song: Fight On You Catamounts
- Mascot: Paws
- Marching band: Western Carolina University Pride of the Mountains Marching Band
- Website: catamountsports.com/football

The Western Carolina Catamounts football program represents Western Carolina University. The team competes in the NCAA Division I Football Championship Subdivision (FCS) and are members of the Southern Conference. Since the school's first football team was fielded in 1931, the Catamounts have a record of 364–540–23, have made two postseason appearances, and have played in one national championship game.

Western Carolina plays its home games at the 13,742 seat Bob Waters Field at E. J. Whitmire Stadium located on the campus in Cullowhee, North Carolina.

== History ==
=== Head coaching history ===
Western Carolina has had 14 head coaches since the first team was organized in 1931. Kerwin Bell, the current head coach, was hired on April 27, 2021. Bob Waters (1969–1988) holds the record for most wins (116), longest tenure (20 seasons), and highest winning percentage (.550) among all former Western Carolina coaches.

C.C. Poindexter, often called the "Father of Western Carolina Athletics", was instrumental in organizing the first football team in 1931. Then the Western Carolina Teacher's College, Poindexter was the first person hired by the college to work exclusively in athletics and became the first athletic director and football coach. He would later lead the baseball and basketball programs as well.

Tenure	Coach	Record	Pct.
1931–1934	C. C. Poindexter	10–26–2	.290
1935–1938	Ralph James	4–30–3	.149
1939–1941	Jim Whatley	6–15–1	.295
1945	Marion McDonald	1–3	.250
1946–1955	Tom Young	39–55–4	.418
1956–1968	Dan Robinson	51–67–6	.435
1969–1988	Bob Waters	116–94–6	.550
1989	Dale Strahm	3–7–1	.318
1990–1996	Steve Hodgin	31–45	.408
1997–2001	Bill Bleil	23–32	.418
2002–2007	Kent Briggs	22–43	.388
2008–2011	Dennis Wagner	8–36	.182
2012–2021	Mark Speir	33–68	.327
2021–	Kerwin Bell	24–21	.533

=== Postseason ===
- 1949 - The 1949 Western Carolina Catamounts, coached by Tom Young, completed their regular season 8–2, winning the North State Conference championship. Western Carolina was then invited to play West Liberty State in the Smokey Mountain Bowl in Bristol, Tennessee. The Catamounts fell short 20–0.
- 1974 - The 1974 Western Carolina Catamounts, coached by Bob Waters, completed their regular season 9–1, earning a berth to the 1974 NCAA Division II playoff. The Catamounts had wins over ranked opponents Indiana State and Western Kentucky during the season. They then traveled to No.1 ranked Louisiana Tech where they were defeated 10–7.
- 1983 - The 1983 Western Carolina Catamounts, coached by Bob Waters, completed their regular season 8-2-1, earning a berth to the 1983 NCAA Division I-AA playoffs. The Catamounts then hosted their first ever playoff game against Colgate, winning 24–23. Western Carolina then traveled to No.2 seed Holy Cross, where they upset the Crusaders 28–21. In the semifinals, they beat No.3 seed, and Southern Conference rival, Furman 14–7. In the 1983 Division I-AA National Championship Game at Hagood Stadium in Charleston, South Carolina, the Catamounts fell to No.1 seed Southern Illinois 43–7.

=== Classifications ===
- 1973–1976: NCAA Division II
- 1977: NCAA Division I
- 1978–1981: NCAA Division I–A
- 1982–present: NCAA Division I–AA

=== Conference memberships ===
- 1931–1932: Independent
- 1933–1960: North State Conference†
- 1961–1967: Conference Carolinas
- 1968–1972: Independent
- 1973–1976: NCAA Division II Independent
- 1977–present: Southern Conference

†Also members of the Smoky Mountain Conference starting in 1934.

== Playoff appearances ==
=== NCAA Division I-AA/FCS ===
The Catamounts have appeared in the I-AA/FCS playoffs one time, making it to the national championship game, with an overall record of 3–1.

Year	Round	Opponent	Result
1983	First Round; Quarterfinals; Semifinals; Championship	Colgate (2) Holy Cross (3) Furman (1) Southern Illinois	W, 24–23; W, 28–21; W, 14–7; L, 7–43

=== NCAA Division II ===
The Catamounts made one appearance in the Division II playoffs, with a combined record of 0–1.

Year	Round	Opponent	Result
1974	First Round	Louisiana Tech	L, 7–10

== Yearly results ==
Year	Coach	Win	Loss	Tie
1931	C.C. Poindexter	4	4	0
1932	C.C. Poindexter	2	9	0
1933	C.C. Poindexter	1	6	2
1934	C.C. Poindexter	3	7	0
1935	Ralph James	1	10	0
1936	Ralph James	2	7	0
1937	Ralph James	1	6	2
1938	Ralph James	0	7	1
1939	James Whatley	1	6	1
1940	James Whatley	2	4	0
1941	James Whatley	3	5	0
1945	Marion McDonald	1	3	0
1946	Tom Young	6	3	1
1947	Tom Young	3	5	1
1948	Tom Young	7	3	0
1949	Tom Young	8	3	0
1950	Tom Young	3	6	0
1951	Tom Young	3	6	0
1952	Tom Young	2	8	0
1953	Tom Young	1	9	0
1954	Tom Young	4	5	1
1955	Tom Young	2	7	1
1956	Dan Robinson	1	9	0
1957	Dan Robinson	2	5	1
1958	Dan Robinson	1	8	1
1959	Dan Robinson	7	2	1
1960	Dan Robinson	6	5	0
1961	Dan Robinson	4	6	0
1962	Dan Robinson	3	5	1
1963	Dan Robinson	2	6	1
1964	Dan Robinson	5	4	0
1965	Dan Robinson	7	2	0
1966	Dan Robinson	5	5	0
1967	Dan Robinson	4	5	1
1968	Dan Robinson	4	5	0
1969	Bob Waters	9	1	0
1970	Bob Waters	6	3	0
1971	Bob Waters	4	6	0
1972	Bob Waters	7	2	1
1973	Bob Waters	6	3	1
1974	Bob Waters	9	2	0
1975	Bob Waters	3	7	0
1976	Bob Waters	6	4	0
1977	Bob Waters	6	4	1
1978	Bob Waters	6	5	0
1979	Bob Waters	6	5	0
1980	Bob Waters	3	7	1
1981	Bob Waters	4	7	0
1982	Bob Waters	6	5	0
1983	Bob Waters	11	3	1
1984	Bob Waters	8	3	0
1985	Bob Waters	4	6	1
1986	Bob Waters	6	5	0
1987	Bob Waters	4	7	0
1988	Bob Waters	2	9	0
1989	Dale Strahm	3	7	1
1990	Steve Hodgin	3	8	0
1991	Steve Hodgin	2	9	0
1992	Steve Hodgin	7	4	0
1993	Steve Hodgin	6	5	0
1994	Steve Hodgin	6	5	0
1995	Steve Hodgin	3	7	0
1996	Steve Hodgin	4	7	0
1997	Bill Bleil	3	8	0
1998	Bill Bleil	6	5	0
1999	Bill Bleil	3	8	0
2000	Bill Bleil	4	7	0
2001	Bill Bleil	7	4	0
2002	Kent Briggs	5	6	0
2003	Kent Briggs	5	7	0
2004	Kent Briggs	4	7	0
2005	Kent Briggs	5	4	0
2006	Kent Briggs	2	9	0
2007	Kent Briggs	1	10	0
2008	Dennis Wagner	3	9	0
2009	Dennis Wagner	2	9	0
2010	Dennis Wagner	2	9	0
2011	Dennis Wagner	1	10	0
2012	Mark Speir	1	10	0
2013	Mark Speir	2	10	0
2014	Mark Speir	7	5	0
2015	Mark Speir	7	4	0
2016	Mark Speir	2	9	0
2017	Mark Speir	7	5	0
2018	Mark Speir	3	8	0
2019	Mark Speir	3	9	0
2020*	Mark Speir	1	8	0
2021	Kerwin Bell	4	7	0
2022	Kerwin Bell	6	5	0
2023	Kerwin Bell	7	4	0
Total		364	540	23

*2020 fall season was played in the spring of 2021 due to Covid-19

== Rivalries ==
=== Appalachian State - Battle for the Old Mountain Jug ===
The main rivalry of the Catamounts was against their in-state rival Appalachian State. Western Carolina and Appalachian State played annually for the Old Mountain Jug. The two rivals first faced off in 1932, with Appalachian State winning 20–0. The Old Mountain Jug trophy was first introduced in 1976. After Appalachian State moved to the Football Bowl Subdivision in 2014, the two have not met since. Appalachian State leads the series 58–19–1. Appalachian State's biggest win is 54–7 in 1939 and Western Carolina's biggest win is 44–14 in 1977.

=== East Tennessee State - Blue Ridge Border Battle ===
While Western Carolina and ETSU have played each other since 1932, the Blue Ridge Border Battle was started in 2018, which introduced a traveling trophy known as 'the Rock' which features a rock from the Appalachian Trail. The first Blue Ridge Border Battle game was in 2018, with ETSU winning in triple overtime 45–43. The two schools played annually from 1975–2003 as members of the Southern Conference until ETSU discontinued its football program after the 2003 season. The series resumed in 2016 when ETSU restarted its program and rejoined the Southern Conference with the game being played at Bristol Motor Speedway, which was won by ETSU 34–31. Western Carolina leads the series 26–25–1. Western Carolina's biggest win is 58–7 in 2023 and ETSU's biggest win is 49–10 in 1996.

== Catamounts in the NFL ==
Player	Position	Years in NFL
Steve Williams	DE	1974
Eddie McGill	TE	1982–1983
Dean Biasucci	K	1984–1995
Tiger Greene	DB	1985–1990
Louis Cooper	LB	1985–1993
Clyde Simmons	DE	1986–2000
Leonard Williams	RB	1987
Fred Davis	DB	1987
Kirk Roach	K	1988–1989
Tony Jones	OL	1988–2000
Willie J. Williams	DB	1993–2005
Andrew Jordan	TE	1994–2001
David Patten	WR	1997–2008
Brad Hoover	FB	2000–2009
Detrez Newsome	RB	2018–2018
Keion Crossen	DB	2018–2025

== Future non-conference opponents ==
Announced schedules as of July 14, 2026.

2026	2027	2028	2029	2030	2031
Eastern Kentucky	at Eastern Kentucky	at Appalachian State	at Elon	at Charlotte	at Georgia
at Campbell	at East Carolina	North Carolina Central		Elon	
at Cincinnati	Campbell				
Presbyterian	at North Carolina Central				

== See also ==
- Western Carolina Catamounts
