= 2002 Chattanooga Mocs football team =

American college football season

2002 Chattanooga Mocs football
- Conference: Southern Conference
- Record: 2–10 (2–6 SoCon)
- Head coach: Donnie Kirkpatrick (3rd season)
- Offensive coordinator: Donnie Kirkpatrick (5th season)
- Defensive coordinator: Tim Burke (1st season)
- Home stadium: Finley Stadium

2002 Southern Conference football standings
	Conf.			Overall
Team	W		L	W		L
No. 3 Georgia Southern $^	7	–	1	11	–	3
No. 14 Wofford	6	–	2	9	–	3
No. 10 Appalachian State ^	6	–	2	8	–	4
No. 9 Furman ^	6	–	2	8	–	4
VMI	3	–	5	6	–	6
Western Carolina	3	–	5	5	–	6
East Tennessee State	2	–	6	4	–	8
Chattanooga	2	–	6	2	–	10
The Citadel	1	–	7	3	–	9
$ – Conference champion; ^ – NCAA Division I-AA playoff participant; Rankings from The Sports Network I-AA Poll

The 2002 Chattanooga Mocs football team represented the University of Tennessee at Chattanooga as a member of the Southern Conference (SoCon) in the 2002 NCAA Division I-AA football season. The Mocs were led by third-year head coach Donnie Kirkpatrick and played their home games at Finley Stadium. They finished the season 2–10 overall and 2–6 in SoCon play to tied for seventh place.

== Schedule ==
Date	Time	Opponent	Site	TV	Result	Attendance	Source
August 31	6:00 p.m.	at West Virginia*	Mountaineer Field; Morgantown, WV	MSN	L 7–56	54,455	
September 7	1:30 p.m.	Alabama State*	Finley Stadium; Chattanooga, TN		L 23–41	7,180	
September 14	7:00 p.m.	at Tennessee Tech*	Tucker Stadium; Cookeville, TN		L 3–13	8,235	
September 21	6:00 p.m.	Gardner–Webb*	Finley Stadium; Chattanooga, TN		L 24–26	4,317	
September 28	6:00 p.m.	No. 18 Georgia Southern	Finley Stadium; Chattanooga, TN		L 10–38	8,566	
October 5	3:00 p.m.	at No. 20 Wofford	Gibbs Stadium; Spartanburg, SC		L 21–27 ^{OT}	9,107	
October 19	6:00 p.m.	VMI	Finley Stadium; Chattanooga, TN		L 31–35	5,237	
October 26	2:00 p.m.	at Western Carolina	Whitmire Stadium; Cullowhee, NC		L 28–45	7,021	
November 2	1:30 p.m.	No. 14 Appalachian State^{†}	Finley Stadium; Chattanooga, TN		L 17–20	7,139	
November 9	2:00 p.m.	at The Citadel	Johnson Hagood Stadium; Charleston, SC		W 34–31	18,818	
November 16	1:30 p.m.	East Tennessee State	Finley Stadium; Chattanooga, TN		W 27–10	3,813	
November 23	2:00 p.m.	at No. 8 Furman	Paladin Stadium; Greenville, SC		L 7–35	7,423	
*Non-conference game; ^{†}Homecoming; Rankings from The Sports Network Poll released prior to the game; All times are in Eastern time
