= Kent Briggs =

American football player and coach (1957/1958–2026)

Biographical details
- Born: September 22, 1957
- Died: June 19, 2026 (aged 68)

Playing career
- 1976–1979: Western Carolina
- Position: Quarterback

Coaching career (HC unless noted)
- 1982–1988: Western Carolina (assistant)
- 1989–1995: NC State (assistant)
- 1996–1999: NC State (co-DC)
- 2000: Connecticut (DB)
- 2001: Connecticut (DC)
- 2002–2007: Western Carolina
- 2010–2012: Smoky Mountain HS (NC) (assistant)
- 2014–2018: Cherokee HS (NC)

Head coaching record
- Overall: 22–43 (college); 37–29 (high school)

Kent Briggs (September 22, 1957 – June 19, 2026) was an American football coach. He served as the head football coach at Western Carolina University from 2002 to 2007, compiling a record of 22–43. A native of Asheville, North Carolina, Briggs played as a quarterback at A. C. Reynolds High School in Asheville and then at Western Carolina. He was the head football coach at Cherokee High School in Cherokee, North Carolina, from 2014 to 2018, leading his team to a 1A state title in 2017 and an overall record of 37–29.

Briggs died from prostate cancer on June 19, 2026, at the age of 68.

== Head coaching record ==
=== College ===
Year	Team	Overall	Conference	Standing	Bowl/playoffs
Western Carolina Catamounts (Southern Conference) (2002–2007)
2002	Western Carolina	5–6	3–5	T–5th	
2003	Western Carolina	5–7	3–5	T–6th	
2004	Western Carolina	4–7	2–5	T–5th	
2005	Western Carolina	5–4	4–3	4th	
2006	Western Carolina	2–9	0–7	8th	
2007	Western Carolina	1–10	0–7	8th	
Western Carolina:		22–43	12–32		
Total:		22–43			
