= 2002 Western Carolina Catamounts football team =

American college football season

2002 Western Carolina Catamounts football
- Conference: Southern Conference
- Record: 5–6 (3–5 SoCon)
- Head coach: Kent Briggs (1st season)
- Defensive coordinator: Geoff Collins (1st season)
- Home stadium: Bob Waters Field at E. J. Whitmire Stadium

2002 Southern Conference football standings
	Conf.			Overall
Team	W		L	W		L
No. 3 Georgia Southern $^	7	–	1	11	–	3
No. 14 Wofford	6	–	2	9	–	3
No. 10 Appalachian State ^	6	–	2	8	–	4
No. 9 Furman ^	6	–	2	8	–	4
VMI	3	–	5	6	–	6
Western Carolina	3	–	5	5	–	6
East Tennessee State	2	–	6	4	–	8
Chattanooga	2	–	6	2	–	10
The Citadel	1	–	7	3	–	9
$ – Conference champion; ^ – NCAA Division I-AA playoff participant; Rankings from The Sports Network I-AA Poll

The 2002 Western Carolina Catamounts team represented Western Carolina University as a member of the Southern Conference (SoCon) in the 2002 NCAA Division I-AA football season. The Catamounts were led by first-year head coach head coach Kent Briggs and played their home games at Bob Waters Field at E. J. Whitmire Stadium in Cullowhee, North Carolina. Western Carolina compiled an overall record of 5–6 with a mark of 3–5 in conference play, tying for fifth place in the SoCon.

== Schedule ==
Date	Opponent	Site	TV	Result	Attendance	Source
August 31	at Liberty*	Williams Stadium; Lynchburg, VA		W 23–3	8,375	
September 7	at Auburn*	Jordan–Hare Stadium; Auburn, AL	PPV	L 0–56	80,067	
September 14	West Virginia Tech*	Bob Waters Field at E. J. Whitmire Stadium; Cullowhee, NC		W 47–3	5,121	
September 21	at The Citadel	Johnson Hagood Stadium; Charleston, SC		W 37–34	14,105	
September 28	East Tennessee State	Bob Waters Field at E. J. Whitmire Stadium; Cullowhee, NC		L 7–27	8,121	
October 5	at No. 5 Furman	Paladin Stadium; Greenville, SC		L 23–24	13,125	
October 12	No. 16 Georgia Southern	Bob Waters Field at E. J. Whitmire Stadium; Cullowhee, NC		L 24–41	7,749	
October 19	at Wofford	Gibbs Stadium; Spartanburg, SC		L 24–31	8,182	
October 26	Chattanooga^{†}	Bob Waters Field at E. J. Whitmire Stadium; Cullowhee, NC		W 45–28	7,021	
November 2	at VMI	Alumni Memorial Field; Lexington, VA		W 35–23	5,820	
November 9	No. 8 Appalachian State	Bob Waters Field at E. J. Whitmire Stadium; Cullowhee, NC (rivalry)		L 14–24	10,321	
*Non-conference game; ^{†}Homecoming; Rankings from The Sports Network Poll released prior to the game
