= 2002 Liberty Flames football team =

American college football season

2002 Liberty Flames football
- Conference: Big South Conference
- Record: 2–9 (1–2 Big South)
- Head coach: Ken Karcher (3rd season)
- Home stadium: Williams Stadium

2002 Big South Conference football standings
	Conf.			Overall
Team	W		L	W		L
No. 22 Gardner–Webb $	3	–	0	9	–	1
Elon	2	–	1	4	–	7
Liberty	1	–	2	2	–	9
Charleston Southern	0	–	3	4	–	8
$ – Conference champion; Rankings from The Sports Network poll

The 2002 Liberty Flames football team represented Liberty University a member of the Big South Conference during the 2002 NCAA Division I-AA football season. Led by third-year head coach Ken Karcher, the Flames compiled an overall record of 2–9 with a mark of 1–2 in conference play, placing third in the Big South. Liberty played home games at Williams Stadium in Lynchburg, Virginia.

== Schedule ==
Date	Time	Opponent	Site	Result	Attendance	Source
August 31	3:30 p.m.	Western Carolina*	Williams Stadium; Lynchburg, VA	L 3–23	8,375	
September 7		West Liberty State*	Williams Stadium; Lynchburg, VA	W 35–6		
September 21	3:30 p.m.	No. 5 Appalachian State*	Williams Stadium; Lynchburg, VA	L 22–29	8,173	
September 28	6:00 p.m.	at UCF*	Florida Citrus Bowl; Orlando, FL	L 17–48	20,416	
October 5		Gardner–Webb^{†}	Williams Stadium; Lynchburg, VA	L 21–31	9,739	
October 12	2:00 p.m.	at Akron*	Rubber Bowl; Akron, OH	L 21–49	7,132	
October 19	1:30 p.m.	Charleston Southern	Williams Stadium; Lynchburg, VA	W 31–17	6,137	
October 26		at VMI*	Alumni Memorial Field; Lexington, VA	L 14–38	6,165	
November 2		No. 17 Eastern Kentucky*	Williams Stadium; Lynchburg, VA	L 28–35 ^{OT}		
November 9		at Elon	Rhodes Stadium; Elon, NC	L 35–56	8,462	
November 23		at Hofstra*	Hofstra Stadium; Hempstead, NY	L 3–32		
*Non-conference game; ^{†}Homecoming; Rankings from The Sports Network Poll released prior to the game; All times are in Eastern time
