= 2002 VMI Keydets football team =

American college football season

2002 VMI Keydets football
- Conference: Southern Conference
- Record: 6–6 (3–5 SoCon)
- Head coach: Cal McCombs (4th season)
- Offensive coordinator: Jeff Durden (1st season)
- Defensive coordinator: Johnny Burnett (1st season)
- Home stadium: Alumni Memorial Field

2002 Southern Conference football standings
	Conf.			Overall
Team	W		L	W		L
No. 3 Georgia Southern $^	7	–	1	11	–	3
No. 14 Wofford	6	–	2	9	–	3
No. 10 Appalachian State ^	6	–	2	8	–	4
No. 9 Furman ^	6	–	2	8	–	4
VMI	3	–	5	6	–	6
Western Carolina	3	–	5	5	–	6
East Tennessee State	2	–	6	4	–	8
Chattanooga	2	–	6	2	–	10
The Citadel	1	–	7	3	–	9
$ – Conference champion; ^ – NCAA Division I-AA playoff participant; Rankings from The Sports Network poll

The 2002 VMI Keydets football team represented the Virginia Military Institute during the 2002 NCAA Division I-AA football season. It was the Keydets' 112th year of football, and their 79th and final season in the Southern Conference until 2014).

== Schedule ==
Date	Opponent	Site	Result	Attendance	Source
August 31	at Charleston Southern*	Buccaneer Field; North Charleston, SC	W 27–24	2,417	
September 7	Davidson*	Alumni Memorial Field; Lexington, VA	W 41–16	5,923	
September 14	at William & Mary*	Zable Stadium; Williamsburg, VA (rivalry)	L 31–62	9,963	
September 21	at East Tennessee State	Memorial Center; Johnson City, TN	L 21–35	4,770	
September 28	No. 7 Furman	Alumni Memorial Field; Lexington, VA	L 28–55	6,235	
October 5	at No. 18 Georgia Southern	Paulson Stadium; Statesboro, GA	L 7–52	15,621	
October 12	No. 18 Wofford	Alumni Memorial Field; Lexington, VA	W 27–16	7,860	
October 19	at Chattanooga	Finley Stadium; Chattanooga, TN	W 35–31	5,237	
October 26	Liberty*	Alumni Memorial Field; Lexington, VA	W 38–14	6,165	
November 2	Western Carolina	Alumni Memorial Field; Lexington, VA	L 23–35	5,820	
November 9	at No. 14 Appalachian State	Kidd Brewer Stadium; Boone, NC	L 13–54	11,007	
November 16	vs. The Citadel	American Legion Memorial Stadium; Charlotte, NC (Military Classic of the South)	W 23–21	6,936	
*Non-conference game; Rankings from The Sports Network Poll released prior to the game
