= Tom Young (American football) =

American athlete, coach, and administrator (1907–1973)

Biographical details
- Born: June 8, 1907
- Died: March 12, 1973 (aged 65); Winston-Salem, North Carolina, U.S.

Playing career

Football
- 1926–1927: North Carolina

Baseball
- 1925–1928: North Carolina
- Position: Halfback (football)

Coaching career (HC unless noted)

Football
- ?: Lexington HS (NC)
- 1943: North Carolina
- 1946–1955: Western Carolina

Administrative career (AD unless noted)
- 1946–1969: Western Carolina

Head coaching record
- Overall: 44–59–4 (college)
- Bowls: 0–1

Accomplishments and honors

Championships
- 1 North State (1949)

Thomas Bayard Young Jr. (June 8, 1907 – March 12, 1973) was an American football and baseball player, coach, and college athletics administrator. He served as the head football coach at the University of North Carolina at Chapel Hill in 1943 and at Western Carolina University from 1946 to 1955, compiling a career college football record of 44–59–4. Young was also the athletic director at Western Carolina from 1946 until his retirement in 1969.

Young was a native of Monroe, North Carolina. He played college football at North Carolina in 1926 and 1927, where he was an all-Southern Conference halfback. Young died at the age of 65 on March 12, 1973, at Baptist Hospital in Winston-Salem, North Carolina.

== Head coaching record ==
=== College ===
Year	Team	Overall	Conference	Standing	Bowl/playoffs
North Carolina Tar Heels (Southern Conference) (1943)
1943	North Carolina	6–3	2–2	T–5th	
North Carolina:		6–3	2–2		
Western Carolina Catamounts (North State Conference) (1946–1955)
1946	Western Carolina	6–3–1	1–1–1	4th	
1947	Western Carolina	3–5–1	2–3	T–5th	
1948	Western Carolina	7–3	3–1	2nd	
1949	Western Carolina	8–3	4–0	1st	L Smoky Mountain
1950	Western Carolina	3–6	1–4	7th	
1951	Western Carolina	3–6	1–4	T–5th	
1952	Western Carolina	2–8	1–4	T–5th	
1953	Western Carolina	1–9	0–5	7th	
1954	Western Carolina	4–5–1	2–2–1	4th	
1955	Western Carolina	1–8–1	1–4	6th	
Western Carolina:		38–56–4	16–28–2		
Total:		44–59–4			
National championship Conference title Conference division title or championship game berth
