= 2002 Wofford Terriers football team =

American college football season

2002 Wofford Terriers football
- Conference: Southern Conference

Ranking
- Sports Network: No. 14
- Record: 9–3 (6–2 SoCon)
- Head coach: Mike Ayers (15th season)
- Home stadium: Gibbs Stadium

2002 Southern Conference football standings
	Conf.			Overall
Team	W		L	W		L
No. 3 Georgia Southern $^	7	–	1	11	–	3
No. 14 Wofford	6	–	2	9	–	3
No. 10 Appalachian State ^	6	–	2	8	–	4
No. 9 Furman ^	6	–	2	8	–	4
VMI	3	–	5	6	–	6
Western Carolina	3	–	5	5	–	6
East Tennessee State	2	–	6	4	–	8
Chattanooga	2	–	6	2	–	10
The Citadel	1	–	7	3	–	9
$ – Conference champion; ^ – NCAA Division I-AA playoff participant; Rankings from The Sports Network I-AA Poll

The 2002 Wofford Terriers football team was an American football team that represented Wofford College as a member of the Southern Conference (SoCon) during the 2002 NCAA Division I-AA football season. Led by 15th-year head coach Mike Ayers, the Terriers compiled and overall record of 9–3, with a mark of 6–2 in conference play, and finished tied for second in the SoCon.

== Schedule ==
Date	Time	Opponent	Rank	Site	Result	Attendance	Source
August 31	7:00 p.m.	Newberry*		Gibbs Stadium; Spartanburg, SC	W 48–0	5,007	
September 14	6:00 p.m.	at South Carolina State*		Oliver C. Dawson Stadium; Orangeburg, SC	W 7–6	4,745	
September 21	7:00 p.m.	at No. 9 Georgia Southern		Paulson Stadium; Statesboro, GA	W 14–7	15,564	
September 28	6:00 p.m.	at Maryland*	No. 19	Byrd Stadium; College Park, MD	L 8–37	44,098	
October 5	3:00 p.m.	Chattanooga	No. 20	Gibbs Stadium; Spartanburg, SC	W 27–21 ^{OT}	9,107	
October 12	1:00 p.m.	at VMI	No. 18	Alumni Memorial Field; Lexington, VA	L 16–27	7,860	
October 19	1:30 p.m.	Western Carolina		Gibbs Stadium; Spartanburg, SC	W 31–24	8,182	
October 26	2:00 p.m.	at No. 8 Appalachian State	No. 25	Kidd Brewer Stadium; Boone, NC	W 26–19	17,297	
November 2	1:30 p.m.	The Citadel	No. 18	Gibbs Stadium; Spartanburg, SC (rivalry)	W 27–14	9,843	
November 9	6:00 p.m.	at East Tennessee State	No. 15	Memorial Center; Johnson City, TN	W 39–10	6,015	
November 16	1:30 p.m.	No. 9 Furman	No. 10	Gibbs Stadium; Spartanburg, SC (rivalry)	L 21–23	9,814	
November 23	2:00 p.m.	at Elon*	No. 14	Rhodes Stadium; Elon, NC	W 34–9	3,367	
*Non-conference game; Rankings from The Sports Network Poll released prior to the game; All times are in Eastern time
