= 2002 Furman Paladins football team =

American college football season

2002 Furman Paladins football

NCAA Division I-AA First Round, L 38–45 vs. Villanova
- Conference: Southern Conference

Ranking
- Sports Network: No. 9
- Record: 8–4 (6–2 SoCon)
- Head coach: Bobby Lamb (1st season)
- Captains: Billy Napier; LeBryan Sperling; Rodney Johnson
- Home stadium: Paladin Stadium

2002 Southern Conference football standings
	Conf.			Overall
Team	W		L	W		L
No. 3 Georgia Southern $^	7	–	1	11	–	3
No. 14 Wofford	6	–	2	9	–	3
No. 10 Appalachian State ^	6	–	2	8	–	4
No. 9 Furman ^	6	–	2	8	–	4
VMI	3	–	5	6	–	6
Western Carolina	3	–	5	5	–	6
East Tennessee State	2	–	6	4	–	8
Chattanooga	2	–	6	2	–	10
The Citadel	1	–	7	3	–	9
$ – Conference champion; ^ – NCAA Division I-AA playoff participant; Rankings from The Sports Network poll

The 2002 Furman Paladins football team was an American football team that represented Furman University as a member of the Southern Conference (SoCon) during the 2002 NCAA Division I-AA football season. In their first year under head coach Bobby Lamb, the Paladins compiled an overall record of 8–4 with a conference mark of 6–2, finishing tied for second in the SoCon. Furman advanced to the NCAA Division I-AA Football Championship playoffs, where they were upset by Villanova in the first round.

== Schedule ==
Date	Opponent	Rank	Site	Result	Attendance	Source
September 7	at Vanderbilt*	No. 7	Vanderbilt Stadium; Nashville, TN	L 18–49	28,568	
September 14	Elon*	No. 7	Paladin Stadium; Greenville, SC	W 57–7	4,860	
September 21	at No. 22 Richmond*	No. 7	UR Stadium; Richmond, VA	W 17–7	7,189	
September 28	at VMI	No. 7	Alumni Memorial Field; Lexington, VA	W 55–28	6,235	
October 5	Western Carolina	No. 5	Paladin Stadium; Greenville, SC	W 24–23	13,125	
October 12	at No. 4 Appalachian State	No. 5	Kidd Brewer Stadium; Boone, NC	L 15–16	15,331	
October 19	The Citadel	No. 6	Paladin Stadium; Greenville, SC (rivalry)	W 37–10	13,188	
October 26	at East Tennessee State	No. 4	Memorial Center; Johnson City, TN	W 25–0	5,478	
November 9	No. 9 Georgia Southern	No. 4	Paladin Stadium; Greensville, SC	L 24–39	15,794	
November 16	at No. 10 Wofford	No. 9	Gibbs Stadium; Spartanburg, SC (rivalry)	W 23–21	9,814	
November 23	Chattanooga	No. 8	Paladin Stadium; Greenville, SC	W 35–7	7,423	
November 30	at No. 12 Villanova*	No. 6	Villanova Stadium; Villanova, PA (NCAA Division I-AA First Round)	L 38–45	3,031	
*Non-conference game; Rankings from The Sports Network Poll released prior to the game
