= Al Seagraves =

American football player and coach (born 1953)

Biographical details
- Born: April 14, 1953 (age 73)

Playing career
- 1971–1974: Shippensburg
- Positions: Fullback, halfback, linebacker

Coaching career (HC unless noted)
- late 1970s: Shippensburg (assistant)
- 1979–1982: Army (assistant)
- 1983–1985: UCF (DC)
- 1986–1995: The Citadel (assistant HC)
- 1996–2003: Elon

Head coaching record
- Overall: 40–49

Al Seagraves (born April 14, 1953) is an American former college football coach. He served as the head football coach at Elon University from 1996 until 2003, compiling a record of 40–49.

== Head coaching record ==
Year	Team	Overall	Conference	Standing	Bowl/playoffs
Elon Fightin' Christians (South Atlantic Conference) (1996)
1996	Elon	4–7	4–3	T–3rd	
Elon Fightin' Christians (NCAA Division II independent) (1997–1998)
1997	Elon	7–4			
1998	Elon	5–6			
Elon Fightin' Christians / Phoenix (NCAA Division I-AA independent) (1999–2001)
1999	Elon	9–2			
2000	Elon	7–4			
2001	Elon	2–9			
Elon Phoenix (Big South Conference) (2002)
2002	Elon	4–7	2–1	2nd	
Elon Phoenix (Southern Conference) (2003)
2003	Elon	2–10	1–7	9th	
Elon:		40–49	7–11		
Total:		40–49			
