= 2002 Georgia Southern Eagles football team =

American college football season

2002 Georgia Southern Eagles football

SoCon champion

NCAA Division I-AA Semifinal, L 28–31 vs. Western Kentucky
- Conference: Southern Conference

Ranking
- Sports Network: No. 3
- Record: 11–3 (7–1 SoCon)
- Head coach: Mike Sewak (1st season)
- Offensive coordinator: Mitch Ware (1st season)
- Defensive coordinator: Rusty Russell (6th season)
- Home stadium: Paulson Stadium

2002 Southern Conference football standings
	Conf.			Overall
Team	W		L	W		L
No. 3 Georgia Southern $^	7	–	1	11	–	3
No. 14 Wofford	6	–	2	9	–	3
No. 10 Appalachian State ^	6	–	2	8	–	4
No. 9 Furman ^	6	–	2	8	–	4
VMI	3	–	5	6	–	6
Western Carolina	3	–	5	5	–	6
East Tennessee State	2	–	6	4	–	8
Chattanooga	2	–	6	2	–	10
The Citadel	1	–	7	3	–	9
$ – Conference champion; ^ – NCAA Division I-AA playoff participant; Rankings from The Sports Network poll

The 2002 Georgia Southern Eagles football team represented the Georgia Southern University as a member of the Southern Conference (SoCon) during the 2002 NCAA Division I-AA football season. Led by first-year head coach Mike Sewak, the Eagles compiled an overall record of 11–3 with a mark of 7–1 in conference play, winning the SoCon title for the sixth consecutive season. Georgia Southern advanced to the NCAA Division I-AA Football Championship playoffs, where they defeated Bethune–Cookman in the first round and Maine in the quarterfinals before falling to Western Kentucky in the semifinals. Eagles played their home games at Paulson Stadium in Statesboro, Georgia.

== Schedule ==
Date	Time	Opponent	Rank	Site	Result	Attendance	Source
August 29	7:00 pm	at No. 22 Delaware*	No. 5	Delaware Stadium; Newark, DE	L 19–22	19,056	
September 7		Gardner–Webb*	No. 12	Paulson Stadium; Statesboro, GA	W 56–0	18,895	
September 21	7:00 pm	Wofford	No. 9	Paulson Stadium; Statesboro, GA	L 7–14	15,564	
September 28		at Chattanooga	No. 18	Finley Stadium; Chattanooga, TN	W 38–10	8,566	
October 5		VMI	No. 18	Paulson Stadium; Statesboro, GA	W 52–7	15,621	
October 12		at Western Carolina	No. 16	E. J. Whitmire Stadium; Cullowhee, NC	W 41–24	7,749	
October 19		Appalachian State	No. 13	Paulson Stadium; Statesboro, GA (rivalry)	W 36–20	15,146	
October 26	2:00 pm	at The Citadel	No. 10	Johnson Hagood Stadium; Charleston, SC	W 28–24	16,427	
November 2		East Tennessee State	No. 9	Paulson Stadium; Statesboro, GA	W 40–7	16,106	
November 9		at Furman	No. 9	Paladin Stadium; Greenville, SC	W 39–24	15,794	
November 16		Jacksonville State*	No. 4	Paulson Stadium; Statesboro, GA	W 37–13	8,544	
November 30		No. 11 Bethune–Cookman*	No. 2	Paulson Stadium; Statesboro, GA (NCAA Division I-AA First Round)	W 34–0	7,395	
December 7		No. 7 Maine*	No. 2	Paulson Stadium; Statesboro, GA (NCAA Division I-AA Quarterfinal)	W 31–7	6,708	
December 14	5:30 pm	No. 15 Western Kentucky*	No. 2	Paulson Stadium; Statesboro, GA (NCAA Division I-AA Semifinal)	L 28–31	6,573	
*Non-conference game; Rankings from The Sports Network Poll released prior to the game; All times are in Eastern time
