= 2002 Elon Phoenix football team =

American college football season

2002 Elon Phoenix football
- Conference: Big South Conference
- Record: 4–7 (2–1 Big South)
- Head coach: Al Seagraves (7th season)
- Home stadium: Rhodes Stadium

2002 Big South Conference football standings
	Conf.			Overall
Team	W		L	W		L
No. 22 Gardner–Webb $	3	–	0	9	–	1
Elon	2	–	1	4	–	7
Liberty	1	–	2	2	–	9
Charleston Southern	0	–	3	4	–	8
$ – Conference champion; Rankings from The Sports Network poll

The 2002 Elon Phoenix football team was an American football team that represented Elon University as a member of the Big South Conference during the 2002 NCAA Division I-AA football season. Led by seventh-year head coach Al Seagraves, the Phoenix compiled an overall record of 4–7, with a mark of 2–1 in conference play, and finished second in the Big South.

== Schedule ==
Date	Opponent	Site	Result	Attendance	Source
September 7	FIU*	Rhodes Stadium; Elon, NC	W 23–22	5,580	
September 14	at No. 7 Furman*	Paladin Stadium; Greenville, SC	L 7–57	4,860	
September 21	Johnson C. Smith*	Rhodes Stadium; Elon, NC	W 38–14	10,520	
September 28	at North Carolina A&T*	Aggie Stadium; Greensboro, NC	L 20–34	17,349	
October 5	at No. 9 Northwestern State*	Harry Turpin Stadium; Natchitoches, LA	L 20–47	11,259	
October 12	at Gardner–Webb	Ernest W. Spangler Stadium; Boiling Springs, NC	L 27–38	4,198	
October 19	at East Tennessee State*	Memorial Center; Johnson City, TN	L 13–31	6,987	
November 2	Hofstra*	Rhodes Stadium; Elon, NC	L 13–27		
November 9	Liberty	Rhodes Stadium; Elon, NC	W 56–35	8,462	
November 16	at Charleston Southern	Buccaneer Field; North Charleston, SC	W 21–13	514	
November 23	No. 14 Wofford*	Rhodes Stadium; Elon, NC	L 9–34	3,367	
*Non-conference game; Rankings from The Sports Network Poll released prior to the game
