= 2002 Charleston Southern Buccaneers football team =

American college football season

2002 Charleston Southern Buccaneers football
- Conference: Big South Conference
- Record: 4–8 (0–3 Big South)
- Head coach: David Dowd (12th season)
- Defensive coordinator: Todd Knight (5th season)
- Home stadium: Buccaneer Field

2002 Big South Conference football standings
| | Conf. | | | Overall |
| Team | W | | L | W | | L |
|---|---|---|---|---|---|---|
| No. 22 Gardner–Webb $ | 3 | – | 0 | 9 | – | 1 |
| Elon | 2 | – | 1 | 4 | – | 7 |
| Liberty | 1 | – | 2 | 2 | – | 9 |
| Charleston Southern | 0 | – | 3 | 4 | – | 8 |
$ – Conference champion; Rankings from The Sports Network poll

The 2002 Charleston Southern Buccaneers football team represented Charleston Southern University as a member of the Big South Conference during the 2002 NCAA Division I-AA football season. Led by David Dowd in his 12th and final season as head coach, the Buccaneers compiled an overall record of 4–8 with a mark of 0–3 in conference play, finishing last out of four teams in the Big South.

== Schedule ==
| Date | Time | Opponent | Site | Result | Attendance | Source |
|---|---|---|---|---|---|---|
| August 31 | 1:30 pm | VMI* | Buccaneer Field; North Charleston, SC | L 24–27 | 2,417 | |
| September 7 | 1:30 pm | North Greenville* | Buccaneer Field; North Charleston, SC | W 9–0 | 1,857 | |
| September 14 | 1:30 pm | at Presbyterian* | Bailey Memorial Stadium; Clinton, SC | L 6–26 | 2,117 | |
| September 21 | 1:30 pm | West Virginia State* | Buccaneer Field; North Charleston, SC | W 10–3 | 1,217 | |
| September 28 | 1:00 pm | at West Liberty State* | Russek Field; West Liberty, WV | W 28–26 | 750 | |
| October 12 | 1:30 pm | at Savannah State* | Ted Wright Stadium; Savannah, GA | W 21–3 | 2,015 | |
| October 19 | 1:30 pm | at Liberty | Williams Stadium; Lynchburg, VA | L 17–31 | 6,137 | |
| October 26 | 1:30 pm | Jacksonville* | Buccaneer Field; North Charleston, SC | L 21–24 | 2,880 | |
| November 2 | 7:00 pm | at South Florida* | Raymond James Stadium; Tampa, FL | L 6–56 | 23,144 | |
| November 9 | 1:30 pm | No. 24 Gardner–Webb | Buccaneer Field; North Charleston, SC | L 15–57 | 1,771 | |
| November 16 | 1:30 pm | Elon | Buccaneer Field; North Charleston, SC | L 13–21 | 514 | |
| November 21 | 7:00 pm | at The Citadel* | Johnson Hagood Stadium; Charleston, SC | L 19–53 | 12,412 | |
*Non-conference game; Rankings from The Sports Network Poll released prior to the game; All times are in Eastern time
