= 2002 The Citadel Bulldogs football team =

American college football season

2002 The Citadel Bulldogs football
- Conference: Southern Conference
- Record: 3–9 (1–7 SoCon)
- Head coach: Ellis Johnson (2nd season)
- Offensive coordinator: Ahren Self (1st season)
- Defensive coordinator: Les Herrin (2nd season)
- Home stadium: Johnson Hagood Stadium

2002 Southern Conference football standings
	Conf.			Overall
Team	W		L	W		L
No. 3 Georgia Southern $^	7	–	1	11	–	3
No. 14 Wofford	6	–	2	9	–	3
No. 10 Appalachian State ^	6	–	2	8	–	4
No. 9 Furman ^	6	–	2	8	–	4
VMI	3	–	5	6	–	6
Western Carolina	3	–	5	5	–	6
East Tennessee State	2	–	6	4	–	8
Chattanooga	2	–	6	2	–	10
The Citadel	1	–	7	3	–	9
$ – Conference champion; ^ – NCAA Division I-AA playoff participant; Rankings from The Sports Network I-AA Poll

The 2002 The Citadel Bulldogs football team represented The Citadel, The Military College of South Carolina in the 2002 NCAA Division I-AA football season. Ellis Johnson served as head coach for the second season. The Bulldogs played as members of the Southern Conference and played home games at Johnson Hagood Stadium.

== Schedule ==
Date	Time	Opponent	Site	TV	Result	Attendance	Source
September 7	8:00 pm	at No. 24 (I-A) LSU*	Tiger Stadium; Baton Rouge, LA		L 10–35	85,022	
September 14	2:00 pm	No. 15 Delaware*	Johnson Hagood Stadium; Charleston, SC		W 24–20	14,105	
September 21	2:00 pm	Western Carolina	Johnson Hagood Stadium; Charleston, SC		L 34–37	14,102	
September 28	2:00 pm	at No. 5 Appalachian State	Kidd Brewer Stadium; Boone, NC		L 28–37	17,381	
October 5	3:00 pm	at Wyoming*	War Memorial Stadium; Laramie, WY		L 30–34	12,787	
October 12	2:00 pm	East Tennessee State	Johnson Hagood Stadium; Charleston, SC		W 26–7	17,627	
October 19	3:30 pm	at No. 6 Furman	Paladin Stadium; Greenville, SC (rivalry)	CSS	L 10–37	13,188	
October 26	2:00 pm	No. 10 Georgia Southern	Johnson Hagood Stadium; Charleston, SC		L 24–28	16,427	
November 2	1:30 pm	at No. 18 Wofford	Gibbs Stadium; Spartanburg, SC (rivalry)		L 14–27	9,843	
November 9	2:00 pm	Chattanooga^{†}	Johnson Hagood Stadium; Charleston, SC		L 31–34	18,818	
November 16	1:30 pm	vs. VMI	American Legion Memorial Stadium; Charlotte, NC (Military Classic of the South)		L 21–23	6,936	
November 21	7:00 pm	Charleston Southern*	Johnson Hagood Stadium; Charleston, SC		W 53–19	12,412	
*Non-conference game; ^{†}Homecoming; Rankings from The Sports Network Poll released prior to the game; All times are in Eastern time
