= 2002 East Tennessee State Buccaneers football team =

American college football season

2002 East Tennessee State Buccaneers football
- Conference: Southern Conference
- Record: 4–8 (2–6 SoCon)
- Head coach: Paul Hamilton (6th season)
- Home stadium: Memorial Center

2002 Southern Conference football standings
| | Conf. | | | Overall |
| Team | W | | L | W | | L |
|---|---|---|---|---|---|---|
| No. 3 Georgia Southern $^ | 7 | – | 1 | 11 | – | 3 |
| No. 14 Wofford | 6 | – | 2 | 9 | – | 3 |
| No. 10 Appalachian State ^ | 6 | – | 2 | 8 | – | 4 |
| No. 9 Furman ^ | 6 | – | 2 | 8 | – | 4 |
| VMI | 3 | – | 5 | 6 | – | 6 |
| Western Carolina | 3 | – | 5 | 5 | – | 6 |
| East Tennessee State | 2 | – | 6 | 4 | – | 8 |
| Chattanooga | 2 | – | 6 | 2 | – | 10 |
| The Citadel | 1 | – | 7 | 3 | – | 9 |
$ – Conference champion; ^ – NCAA Division I-AA playoff participant; Rankings from The Sports Network I-AA Poll

The 2002 East Tennessee State Buccaneers football team was an American football team that represented East Tennessee State University as a member of the Southern Conference (SoCon) during the 2002 NCAA Division I-AA football season. Led by sixth-year head coach Paul Hamilton, the Buccaneers compiled and overall record of 4–8, with a mark of 2–6 in conference play, and finished tied for seventh in the SoCon.

== Schedule ==
| Date | Time | Opponent | Site | Result | Attendance | Source |
|---|---|---|---|---|---|---|
| August 31 | 7:00 p.m. | at No. 25 (I-A) NC State* | Carter–Finley Stadium; Raleigh, NC | L 0–34 | 42,507 | |
| September 7 | 6:00 p.m. | Mars Hill* | Memorial Center; Johnson City, TN | W 20–10 | 7,500 | |
| September 14 | 6:00 p.m. | at Gardner–Webb* | Ernest W. Spangler Stadium; Boiling Springs, NC | L 10–13 | 2,498 | |
| September 21 | 6:00 p.m. | VMI | Memorial Center; Johnson City, TN | W 35–21 | 4,770 | |
| September 28 | 6:00 p.m. | at Western Carolina | E. J. Whitmire Stadium; Cullowhee, NC | W 27–7 | 8,121 | |
| October 5 | 6:00 p.m. | No. 4 Appalachian State | Memorial Center; Johnson City, TN | L 10–29 | 8,304 | |
| October 12 | 2:00 p.m. | at The Citadel | Johnson Hagood Stadium; Charleston, SC | L 7–26 | 17,627 | |
| October 19 | 2:00 p.m. | Elon* | Memorial Center; Johnson City, TN | W 31–15 | 6,987 | |
| October 26 | 3:30 p.m. | No. 4 Furman | Memorial Center; Johnson City, TN | L 0–25 | 5,478 | |
| November 2 | 3:00 p.m. | at No. 9 Georgia Southern | Paulson Stadium; Statesboro, GA | L 7–40 | 16,106 | |
| November 9 | 6:00 p.m. | No. 15 Wofford | Memorial Center; Johnson City, TN | L 10–39 | 6,015 | |
| November 16 | 1:30 p.m. | at Chattanooga | Finley Stadium; Chattanooga, TN | L 10–27 | 3,813 | |
*Non-conference game; Rankings from The Sports Network Poll released prior to the game; All times are in Eastern time
