= 2002 Appalachian State Mountaineers football team =

American college football season

2002 Appalachian State Mountaineers football

NCAA Division I-AA First Round, L 13–14 vs. Maine
- Conference: Southern Conference

Ranking
- Sports Network: No. 10
- Record: 8–4 (6–2 SoCon)
- Head coach: Jerry Moore (14th season)
- Home stadium: Kidd Brewer Stadium

2002 Southern Conference football standings
	Conf.			Overall
Team	W		L	W		L
No. 3 Georgia Southern $^	7	–	1	11	–	3
No. 14 Wofford	6	–	2	9	–	3
No. 10 Appalachian State ^	6	–	2	8	–	4
No. 9 Furman ^	6	–	2	8	–	4
VMI	3	–	5	6	–	6
Western Carolina	3	–	5	5	–	6
East Tennessee State	2	–	6	4	–	8
Chattanooga	2	–	6	2	–	10
The Citadel	1	–	7	3	–	9
$ – Conference champion; ^ – NCAA Division I-AA playoff participant; Rankings from The Sports Network poll

The 2002 Appalachian State Mountaineers football team represented Appalachian State University as a member of the Southern Conference (SoCon) during the 2002 NCAA Division I-AA football season. Led by 14th-year head coach Jerry Moore, the Mountaineers compiled an overall record of 8–4 with a mark of 6–2 in conference play, tying for second place in the SoCon. Appalachian State advanced to the NCAA Division I-AA Football Championship playoffs, where they lost to Maine in the first round. The Mountaineers played their home games at Kidd Brewer Stadium in Boone, North Carolina.

== Schedule ==
Date	Opponent	Rank	Site	TV	Result	Attendance	Source
August 31	at No. 19 (I-A) Marshall*	No. 2	Marshall University Stadium; Huntington, WV (rivalry)	ESPN Plus	L 17–50	31,042	
September 14	No. 16 Eastern Kentucky*	No. 5	Kidd Brewer Stadium; Boone, NC		W 36–28	11,211	
September 21	at Liberty*	No. 5	Williams Stadium; Lynchburg, VA		W 29–22	8,173	
September 28	The Citadel	No. 5	Kidd Brewer Stadium; Boone, NC		W 37–28	17,381	
October 5	East Tennessee State	No. 4	Memorial Center; Johnson City, TN		W 29–10	8,304	
October 12	No. 5 Furman	No. 4	Kidd Brewer Stadium; Boone, NC		W 16–15	15,331	
October 19	at No. 13 Georgia Southern	No. 3	Paulson Stadium; Statesboro, GA (rivalry)		L 20–36	15,146	
October 26	No. 25 Wofford	No. 8	Kidd Brewer Stadium; Boone, NC		L 19–26	17,297	
November 2	at Chattanooga	No. 14	Finley Stadium; Chattanooga, TN		W 20–17	7,139	
November 9	VMI	No. 14	Kidd Brewer Stadium; Boone, NC		W 54–13	11,007	
November 16	at Western Carolina	No. 8	E. J. Whitmire Stadium; Cullowhee, NC (Battle for the Old Mountain Jug)		W 24–14	10,321	
November 30	No. 7 Maine*	No. 5	Kidd Brewer Stadium; Boone, NC (NCAA Division I-AA First Round)		L 13–14	4,311	
*Non-conference game; Rankings from The Sports Network Poll released prior to the game
