= Ralph James (coach) =

American football and basketball coach (1902–1981)

Biographical details
- Born: November 3, 1902; North Carolina, U.S.
- Died: April 13, 1981 (aged 78); Asheville, North Carolina, U.S.

Playing career

Football
- 1925–1927: Wake Forest

Basketball
- ?–1928: Wake Forest

Baseball
- ?–1929: Wake Forest
- Positions: Quarterback (football); Forward (basketball)

Coaching career (HC unless noted)

Football
- 1929–1931: Blue Ridge School (NC)
- 1932–1935: Weaver/Brevard
- 1936–1938: Western Carolina
- 1941–1944: Lee H. Edwards HS (NC)
- 1945–1949: High Point

Basketball
- 1929–1932: Blue Ridge School (NC)
- 1936–1938: Western Carolina
- 1945–1950: High Point

Head coaching record
- Overall: 25–38–9 (college football)

Accomplishments and honors

Championships
- Football; 1 North State (1945)

Ralph Emerson James Sr. (November 3, 1902 – April 13, 1981) was an American football and basketball coach. He served as the head football coach at Brevard College in Brevard, North Carolina (1932–1935), Western Carolina University (1936–1938), and High Point University (1945–1949).

James attended Wake Forest College—now known as Wake Forest University—where he played college football as a quarterback, college basketball as a forward, and college baseball. He died on April 13, 1981, in Asheville, North Carolina.

== Head coaching record ==
=== College football ===
Year	Team	Overall	Conference	Standing	Bowl/playoffs
Western Carolina Catamounts (North State Conference) (1936–1938)
1936	Western Carolina	2–7	1–2	5th	
1937	Western Carolina	1–6–2	0–3	T–5th	
1938	Western Carolina	0–7–1	0–3	7th	
Western Carolina:		3–20–3	1–8		
High Point Panthers (North State Conference) (1945–1949)
1945	High Point	5–0–1	5–0	T–1st	
1946	High Point	7–2–1	3–2–1	3rd	
1947	High Point	5–4–2	3–3–1	4th	
1948	High Point	5–3–2	4–3–1	5th	
1949	High Point	0–9	0–6	9th	
High Point:		22–18–6	15–14–3		
Total:		25–38–9			
National championship Conference title Conference division title or championship game berth
