= 2002 Gardner–Webb Runnin' Bulldogs football team =

American college football season

2002 Gardner–Webb Runnin' Bulldogs football

Big South champion
- Conference: Big South Conference

Ranking
- Sports Network: No. 22
- Record: 9–1 (3–0 Big South)
- Head coach: Steve Patton (6th season)
- Home stadium: Ernest W. Spangler Stadium

2002 Big South Conference football standings
	Conf.			Overall
Team	W		L	W		L
No. 22 Gardner–Webb $	3	–	0	9	–	1
Elon	2	–	1	4	–	7
Liberty	1	–	2	2	–	9
Charleston Southern	0	–	3	4	–	8
$ – Conference champion; Rankings from The Sports Network poll

The 2002 Gardner–Webb Runnin' Bulldogs football team represented Gardner–Webb University as a member of the Big South Conference during the 2002 NCAA Division I-AA football season. Led by Steve Patton in his sixth-year as head coach, the Runnin' Bulldogs compiled an overall record of 9–1 with a mark of 3–0 in conference play, and were Big South champions. Gardner–Webb played home games at Ernest W. Spangler Stadium in Boiling Springs, North Carolina.

== Schedule ==
Date	Time	Opponent	Rank	Site	Result	Attendance	Source
August 31		Morgan State*		Ernest W. Spangler Stadium; Boiling Springs, NC	W 28–24	2,567	
September 7		at No. 12 Georgia Southern*		Paulson Stadium; Statesboro, GA	L 0–56	18,895	
September 14	6:00 p.m.	East Tennessee State*		Ernest W. Spangler Stadium; Boiling Springs, NC	W 13–10	2,498	
September 21	6:00 p.m.	at Chattanooga*		Finley Stadium; Chattanooga, TN	W 26–24	4,317	
October 5		at Liberty		Williams Stadium; Lynchburg, VA	W 31–21	9,739	
October 12		Elon		Ernest W. Spangler Stadium; Boiling Springs, NC	W 38–27	4,198	
October 26		at FIU*		FIU Stadium; Miami, FL	W 17–14	6,733	
November 2		Tennessee–Martin*		Ernest W. Spangler Stadium; Boiling Springs, NC	W 24–0	5,879	
November 9	1:30 p.m.	at Charleston Southern	No. 24	Buccaneer Field; North Charleston, SC	W 57–15	1,771	
November 16		Savannah State*	No. 22	Ernest W. Spangler Stadium; Boiling Springs, NC	W 44–13		
*Non-conference game; Rankings from The Sports Network Poll released prior to the game; All times are in Eastern time
