= Marion McDonald =

American football and basketball coach

Marion MacDonald
Biographical details
- Born: October 1, 1914; Letcher, South Dakota, U.S.
- Died: January 18, 1990 (aged 75); Topeka, Kansas, U.S.

Coaching career (HC unless noted)

Football
- 1938–1941: Western Carolina (assistant)
- 1945: Western Carolina
- 1946: Western Carolina (assistant)

Basketball
- 1945–1947: Western Carolina
- 1949–1950: Fort Hays State (assistant)
- 1951–1960: Washburn

Head coaching record
- Overall: 1–3 (football); 134–97 (basketball)

Marion G. MacDonald (October 1, 1914 – January 18, 1990) was an American football and basketball coach. He served as the head basketball coach at Western Carolina University–then known as Western Carolina Teachers College–from 1945 to 1947 and Washburn University in Topeka, Kansas from 1951 to 1960. During his time at Western Carolina, he also served as an assistant football coach and, for one season, head coach in 1945.
