= C. C. Poindexter (coach) =

American football and basketball coach (1898–1958)

Biographical details
- Born: November 20, 1898; Macon County, North Carolina, U.S.
- Died: December 24, 1958 (aged 60); Canton, North Carolina, U.S.

Playing career

Football
- 1923: North Carolina
- Position: Guard

Coaching career (HC unless noted)

Football
- 1931: Weaver
- 1932–1935: Western Carolina

Basketball
- 1932–1936: Western Carolina

Charles Crawford Poindexter (November 20, 1898 – December 24, 1958) was an American football and basketball coach. He served as the head football coach at Western Carolina University from 1932 to 1935. Poindexter was also the head basketball coach at Western Carolina from 1932 to 1936.

A former University of North Carolina lineman, Poindexter was the head football coach at Weaver College in Weaverville, North Carolina in 1931. He died of a heart attack, on December 24, 1958, at his home in Canton, North Carolina.
