= Miracle on the Mountain =

2002 college football game in North Carolina

The Miracle on the Mountain
- Conference game
Furman Paladins	Appalachian State Mountaineers
(4–1)	(4–1)
15	16
Head coach: Bobby Lamb	Head coach: Jerry Moore
	1	2	3	4	Total
Furman	0	3	3	9	15
Appalachian State	0	0	7	9	16
- Date: October 12, 2002
- Season: 2002
- Stadium: Kidd Brewer Stadium
- Location: Boone, North Carolina
- Attendance: 14,311

The Miracle on the Mountain was a college football game in 2002 that took place between the Furman Paladins and Appalachian State Mountaineers on October 12. The game, which took place in Kidd Brewer Stadium, resulted in a 16–15 Appalachian State victory. The game is remembered for the botched two-point conversion attempt that cost Furman the game. It is considered one of the greatest games in Appalachian State History and the Appalachian State-Furman rivalry.

== Game summary ==
In the fourth quarter, Furman kicked a field goal to give them a 9–7 lead. Appalachian State responded with a 24-yard touchdown pass to give the Mountaineers a 14–9 lead with 5:39 left in the game. Then Furman quarterback Billy Napier led the Paladins with a 73-yard drive capped off with a go-ahead touchdown to go up 15–14 with 7 seconds left.

=== Two-point conversion ===
Up by one point, Furman elected to go for two-points. On the attempt, Appalachian State defensive end Josh Jefferies intercepted the ball where he proceeded to run the ball to the 16-yard line before lateraling the football to cornerback Derrick Black. Black ran the ball back to the other endzone resulting in two points for the Mountaineers and giving Appalachian State a 16–15 lead. The ensuing Furman onside kick was recovered by Appalachian State and the Mountaineers won 16–15.

=== Scoring summary ===
Scoring summary

Quarter	Time	Drive			Team	Scoring information	Score	
Quarter	Time	Plays	Yards	TOP	Team	Scoring information	Furman	Appalachian State
2	13:19	8	18	3:46	Furman	29-yard field goal by Danny Marshall	3	0
3	7:29	13	49	5:57	Furman	46-yard field goal by Danny Marshall	6	0
3	2:00	–	–	–	Appalachian State	Interception returned 43 yards for touchdown by Jay Lyles, Mark Wright kick good	6	7
4	11:03	10	33	5:57	Furman	36-yard field goal by Danny Marshall	9	7
4	5:39	10	79	5:24	Appalachian State	Joey Hoover 24-yard touchdown reception from Joe Burchette, Mark Wright kick good	9	14
4	0:07	13	73	5:32	Furman	Bear Rinehart 12-yard touchdown reception from Billy Napier, 2-point Billy Napier pass intercepted	15	14
4	0:07	–	–	–	Appalachian State	Interception returned by Derrick Black for a defensive PAT	15	16
"TOP" = time of possession. For other American football terms, see Glossary of American football.							15	16

== Aftermath ==
When the game ended, the Appalachian State fans stormed the field. Both teams finished the season with an 8–4 record. The play was named the 6th best play of the week by SportsCenter Top 10. 247Sports named the game the 2nd best in series history. ABC named the game as its best Sports Radio Call of the Year. In October 2018, Napier returned to Kidd Brewer Stadium as his Louisiana Ragin' Cajuns were taking on Appalachian State. The Ragin' Cajuns lost 17–27. In an interview about the Miracle on the Mountain, Napier said, “It was a great football game, and a heck of a play by the young man."

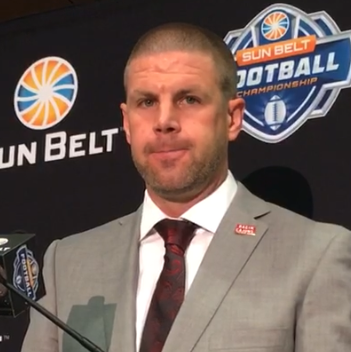
Furman quarterback Billy Napier

== Broadcaster call ==
"Napier throws quickly and it's intercepted, it's intercepted! Appalachian State can take it back for two and take the lead! They've got a chance to take the lead! And it is good! Oh My! That's a two-pointer! Its 16–15! It's 16–15 Appalachian! What a play! Unbelievable! Unbelievable."

— https://www.youtube.com/watch?v=1q74Wo1UL6g
