= Steve Hodgin =

American football player and coach

Biographical details
- Born: c. 1951

Playing career
- 1967–1971: North Carolina
- Position: Center

Coaching career (HC unless noted)
- 1972–1976: Tuscola HS (NC) (assistant)
- 1977–1979: Tuscola HS (NC)
- 1980–1985: Western Carolina (OL)
- 1986–1988: Western Carolina (DC)
- 1989: Western Carolina (DL)
- 1990–1996: Western Carolina

Head coaching record
- Overall: 31–45 (college); 25–6–1 (high school)

Steve Hodgin (born c. 1951) is an American former football player and coach. He served as the head coach at Western Carolina University from 1990 to 1996, compiling a record of 31–45.

== Early life and education ==
A native of Guilford County, North Carolina, Hodgin attended Sumner High School where he was an all-star football player. He played center at the University of North Carolina from 1967 to 1971.

== Coaching career ==
After graduating from North Carolina, Hodgin started a coaching career with Tuscola High School in 1972. He served as an assistant there until 1977, when he was promoted to head coach. He was head coach at Tuscola for three seasons, compiling a record of 25–6–1. In 1980, Hodgin left his head coaching job to join the football staff of Western Carolina University, where he was named offensive line coach.

In 1986, he was promoted to Western Carolina defensive coordinator. In 1989, he was demoted to defensive line coach. After the resignation of Dale Strahm in 1990, Hodgin was named the team's head coach. He made his head coaching debut against NC State on September 1, 1990, but suffered the largest loss in team history. His 1990 team finished with a 3–8 record, and an even worse 2–8 mark in 1991, but rebounded for his third season, winning seven of eleven games. Hodgin compiled a record of 12–10 in the next two seasons, but the team declined and he was fired following a 4–7 mark in 1996. Hodgin posted a 31–45 record in his seven seasons with the school.

== Later life ==
Hodgin later served as a principal at Grimsley High School in Greensboro, North Carolina.

== Head coaching record ==
=== College ===
Year	Team	Overall	Conference	Standing	Bowl/playoffs
Western Carolina Catamounts (Southern Conference) (1990–1996)
1990	Western Carolina	3–8	2–5	6th	
1991	Western Carolina	2–9	2–5	7th	
1992	Western Carolina	7–4	5–2	4th	
1993	Western Carolina	6–5	5–3	3rd	
1994	Western Carolina	6–5	5–3	4th	
1995	Western Carolina	3–7	2–6	8th	
1996	Western Carolina	4–7	1–7	9th	
Western Carolina:		31–45	22–31		
Total:		31–45			
