= Remsen-Union High School =

Location
- 511 Roosevelt St; Remsen, Iowa 51050; United States; 42°48′32″N 95°57′54″W

Information
- School district: Remsen-Union Community School District
- CEEB code: 162480
- Principal: Toby Young
- Teaching staff: 20.1 (as of 2008-09)
- Grades: 9–12
- Enrollment: 104 (2008-09)
- Student to teacher ratio: 5.2 (as of 2008-09)
- Colors: Royal Blue and White
- Athletics: IHSAA
- Athletics conference: War Eagle Conference
- Nickname: Rockets
- Website: School website

Remsen-Union High School was a high school located in Remsen, Iowa. It was a consolidation of the City of Remsen and the Township of Union. Remsen Union merged with the Marcus Meriden Cleghorn school district to start the 2016–17 school year. The former high school is now only a junior high school leaving St. Mary's to be the only high school left in Remsen.

== Extracurricular activities ==
Student groups and activities include band, choir, DECA, H.A.V.E. (Humanitarian And Voluntary Experience) club, National Honor Society, quiz bowl, speech, and student council.

The Remsen-Union Rockets competed in baseball, basketball, cheerleading, dance team, football, golf, softball, track and field, and volleyball. They also shared a bowling, cross-country, and wrestling program with Marcus-Meriden-Cleghorn. The teams had a rivalry with local high schools Remsen St. Mary's and Marcus-Meriden-Cleghorn.

For classification in sports related to the IHSAA, they are classified as 8-man for football and class 1A for every other sport.
