= 2002 USC Trojans football team =

American college football season

2002 USC Trojans football

National champion (Dunkel, Matthews, Sagarin) Pac-10 co-champion Orange Bowl champion

Orange Bowl, W 38–17 vs. Iowa
- Conference: Pacific-10 Conference

Ranking
- Coaches: No. 4
- AP: No. 4
- Record: 11–2 (7–1 Pac-10)
- Head coach: Pete Carroll (2nd season)
- Offensive coordinator: Norm Chow (2nd season)
- Offensive scheme: Pro-style
- Base defense: 4–3
- Captains: Carson Palmer; Troy Polamalu
- Home stadium: Los Angeles Memorial Coliseum (c. 92,000, grass)

2002 Pacific-10 Conference football standings
	Conf.			Overall
Team	W		L	W		L
No. 10 Washington State $+	7	–	1	10	–	3
No. 4 USC %+	7	–	1	11	–	2
Arizona State	5	–	3	8	–	6
Oregon State	4	–	4	8	–	5
UCLA	4	–	4	8	–	5
California	4	–	4	7	–	5
Washington	4	–	4	7	–	6
Oregon	3	–	5	7	–	6
Arizona	1	–	7	4	–	8
Stanford	1	–	7	2	–	9
$ – BCS representative as conference champion; % – BCS at-large representative; + – Conference co-champions; Rankings from AP Poll

The 2002 USC Trojans football team represented the University of Southern California in the 2002 NCAA Division I-A football season. USC ended the regular season ranked #5 in both the AP Poll and the Coaches' Poll. Trojans quarterback Carson Palmer won the 2002 Heisman Trophy as the best college football player in America. During the bowl games, USC had a convincing 38–17 win over #3 Iowa in the Orange Bowl. USC became #4 in the final AP Poll and Coaches' Poll. Other notable players for the USC Trojans in 2002 include WR#2 Kareem Kelly, RB#21 Malaefou Mackenzie, QB#10 Matt Cassel, RB#4 Sultan McCullough, RB#34 Hershel Dennis (FR) RB#25 Justin Fargas, RB#39 Sunny Byrd, RB#34 Chad Pierson, S#43 Troy Polamalu, WR#44 Gregg Guenther, TE#86 Dominique Byrd, WR#83 Keary Colbert, WR#1 Mike Williams, WR#7 Sandy Fletcher, WR#82 Donald Hale, TE#88 Doyal Butler, and WR#87 Grant Mattos.

The team was named national champion by the Dunkel System, Matthews Grid Ratings, and Sagarin Ratings, all NCAA-designated major selectors, although none are claimed by the university.

== Recruiting ==
USC was ranked highly (#12 by Scout, #13 by Rivals) for getting Darnell Bing, Manuel Wright, Winston Justice, Fred Matua, Tom Malone, Jason Mitchell, Hershel Dennis, Kyle Williams, Dominique Byrd, Dallas Sartz, Justin Wyatt, Chris McFoy, Mike Williams, LaJuan Ramsey, Oscar Lua and Brandon Hancock among others.

== Schedule ==
Date	Time	Opponent	Rank	Site	TV	Result	Attendance	Source
September 2	5:00 p.m.	Auburn*	No. 20	Los Angeles Memorial Coliseum; Los Angeles, CA	ABC	W 24–17	63,269	
September 14	12:30 p.m.	at No. 18 Colorado*	No. 17	Folsom Field; Boulder, CO	ABC	W 40–3	53,119	
September 21	4:00 p.m.	at No. 25 Kansas State*	No. 11	KSU Stadium; Manhattan, KS	TBS	L 20–27	49,276	
September 28	3:30 p.m.	No. 23 Oregon State	No. 18	Los Angeles Memorial Coliseum; Los Angeles, CA	FSN	W 22–0	56,417	
October 5	4:00 p.m.	at No. 17 Washington State	No. 18	Martin Stadium; Pullman, WA	TBS	L 27–30 ^{OT}	36,861	
October 12	3:30 p.m.	California	No. 20	Los Angeles Memorial Coliseum; Los Angeles, CA	FSN	W 30–28	63,113	
October 19	12:30 p.m.	No. 22 Washington	No. 19	Los Angeles Memorial Coliseum; Los Angeles, CA	ABC	W 41–21	52,961	
October 26	12:30 p.m.	at No. 14 Oregon	No. 15	Autzen Stadium; Eugene, OR	ABC	W 44–33	56,754	
November 9	5:00 p.m.	at Stanford	No. 10	Stanford Stadium; Stanford, CA (rivalry)	ABC	W 49–17	44,950	
November 16	4:00 p.m.	Arizona State^{†}	No. 8	Los Angeles Memorial Coliseum; Los Angeles, CA	TBS	W 34–13	73,923	
November 23	12:30 p.m.	at No. 25 UCLA	No. 7	Rose Bowl; Pasadena, CA (Victory Bell)	ABC	W 52–21	91,084	
November 30	5:00 p.m.	No. 7 Notre Dame*	No. 6	Los Angeles Memorial Coliseum; Los Angeles, CA (rivalry)	ABC	W 44–13	91,432	
January 2, 2003	5:00 p.m.	vs. No. 3 Iowa*	No. 5	Pro Player Stadium; Miami Gardens, FL (Orange Bowl)	ABC	W 38–17	75,971	
*Non-conference game; ^{†}Homecoming; Rankings from AP Poll released prior to the game; All times are in Pacific time

== Roster ==
2002 USC Trojans football team roster
Players
Coaches
Offense

Pos.	#	Name	Class
WR	31	Will Buchanon	Fr
TE	88	Doyal Butler	Jr
RB	39	Sunny Byrd	So
WR	19	Greig Carlson	Fr
TE	86	Dominique Byrd	Fr
QB	10	Matt Cassel	So
WR	83	Keary Colbert	Jr
RB	25	Justin Fargas	Sr
TE	44	Gregg Guenther	Fr
TE	81	Alex Holmes	Jr
C	62	Norm Katnik	Jr
WR	2	Kareem Kelly	Sr
RB	37	David Kirtman	Fr
QB	11	Matt Leinart	Fr
FB	21	Malaefou MacKenzie	Sr
RB	4	Sultan McCullough	Sr
QB	3	Carson Palmer	Sr
OT	77	Jacob Rogers	Jr
G	78	Lenny Vandermade	So
RB	35	Lee Webb	So
WR	1	Mike Williams	Fr

Defense

Pos.	#	Name	Class
CB	8	Marcell Allmond	Jr
LB	59	Collin Ashton	Fr
DT	84	Shaun Cody	Fr
LB	6	Matt Grootegoed	So
DB	27	Jason Leach	So
DT	99	Mike Patterson	So
S	43	Troy Polamalu	Sr
DT	93	Bernard Riley	Sr
LB	42	Dallas Sartz	Fr
DE	94	Kenechi Udeze	So
CB	24	Justin Wyatt	Fr

Special teams

Pos.	#	Name	Class
K	16	Ryan Killeen	Fr
P	14	Tom Malone	Fr

Head coach

- Pete Carroll

Coordinators/assistant coaches

- Norm Chow – offensive coordinator
- Lane Kiffin – wide receivers
- Ryan Nielsen – volunteer assistant

Legend

- (C) Team captain
- (S) Suspended
- (I) Ineligible
- Injured
- Redshirt

Roster
Last update: 2004-05-13

== Game summaries ==
=== Auburn ===
Auburn at No. 20 USC

Team	1	2	3	4	Total
Tigers	7	7	0	3	17
• No. 20 Trojans	7	7	3	7	24

- Date: September 2
- Location: Los Angeles Memorial Coliseum, Los Angeles

Scoring summary
1	12:05	USC	Kareem Kelly 15-yard pass from Carson Palmer (David Davis kick)	USC 7-0
1	8:31	AUB	Cadillac Williams 23-yard run (Damon Duval kick)	Tied 7-7
2	12:04	USC	Sultan McCullough 3-yard run (David Davis kick)	USC 14-7
2	0:11	AUB	Ronnie Brown 1-yard run (Damon Duval kick)	Tied 14-14
3	7:05	USC	David Davis 37-yard field goal	USC 17-14
4	14:51	AUB	Damon Duval 39-yard field goal	Tied 17-17
4	1:26	USC	Carson Palmer 1-yard run (David Davis kick)	USC 24-17

=== at No. 18 Colorado ===
No. 17 USC at No. 18 Colorado

Team	1	2	3	4	Total
• No. 17 Trojans	14	6	0	20	40
No. 18 Buffaloes	0	0	3	0	3

- Date: September 14
- Location: Folsom Field, Boulder, Colorado
- Game start: 12:30 p.m. PST
- Game attendance: 53,119
- Television network: ABC

Scoring summary
1	9:56	USC	Malaefou MacKenzie 32-yard pass from Carson Palmer (David Davis kick)	USC 7-0
1	2:46	USC	Malaefou MacKenzie 14-yard run (David Davis kick)	USC 14-0
2	2:08	USC	Sultan McCullough 62-yard run (kick failed)	USC 20-0
3	2:51	COL	Patrick Brougham 42-yard field goal	USC 20-3
4	10:24	USC	Carson Palmer 1-yard run (David Davis kick)	USC 27-3
4	8:47	USC	Mike Ross recovered blocked punt in end zone (kick failed)	USC 33-3
4	2:47	USC	Darryl Poston 4-yard run (David Davis kick)	USC 40-3

=== at No. 25 Kansas State ===
No. 11 USC at No. 25 Kansas State

Team	1	2	3	4	Total
No. 11 Trojans	0	6	0	14	20
• No. 25 Wildcats	0	12	7	8	27

- Date: September 21
- Location: KSU Stadium, Manhattan, Kansas
- Referee: John Laurie
- TV announcers (TBS): Ron Thulin, Charles Davis, Craig Sager, and Erin Andrews

Scoring summary
2	5:43	KSU	Jared Brite 35-yard field goal	KSU 3–0
2	3:46	KSU	Ell Roberson 1-yard fun (Brite kick)	KSU 10–0
2	0:32	USC	Mike Patterson 3-yard fumble return (kick blocked)	KSU 10–6
2	0:32	KSU	Terence Newman 98-yard PAT return	KSU 12–6
3	3:55	KSU	Darren Sproles 10-yard fun (Brite kick)	KSU 19–6
4	14:55	KSU	James Terry 10-yard pass from Ell Roberson (Roberson run)	KSU 27–6
4	10:21	USC	Keary Colbert 9-yard pass from Carson Palmer (Ryan Killeen kick)	KSU 27–13
4	6:31	USC	Sultan McCullough 25-yard run (Killeen kick)	KSU 27–20

Statistics	USC	KSU
First downs	16	19
Total yards	276	347
Rushing yards	90	188
Passing yards	186	159
Turnovers	1	5
Time of possession	29:37	30:23

=== No. 23 Oregon State ===
No. 23 Oregon State at No. 18 USC

Team	1	2	3	4	Total
No. 23 Beavers	0	0	0	0	0
• No. 18 Trojans	0	13	6	3	22

- Date: September 28
- Location: Los Angeles Memorial Coliseum, Los Angeles

Scoring summary
2	14:50	USC	Ryan Killeen 43-yard field goal	USC 3-0
2	13:04	USC	Ryan Killeen 42-yard field goal	USC 6-0
2	0:10	USC	Mike Williams 11-yard pass from Carson Palmer (Ryan Killeen kick)	USC 13-0
3	4:45	USC	Mike Williams 16-yard pass from Carson Palmer (pass failed)	USC 19-0
4	10:34	USC	Ryan Killeen 32-yard field goal	USC 22-0

=== at No. 17 Washington State ===
No. 18 USC at No. 17 Washington State

Team	1	2	3	4	OT	Total
No. 18 Trojans	7	0	7	13	0	27
• No. 17 Cougars	10	0	7	10	3	30

- Date: October 5
- Location: Martin Stadium, Pullman, Washington

=== California ===
California at No. 20 USC

Team	1	2	3	4	Total
Golden Bears	14	7	0	7	28
• No. 20 Trojans	3	14	7	6	30

- Date: October 12
- Location: Los Angeles Memorial Coliseum, Los Angeles

Scoring summary
1	10:06	CAL	Joe Igber 3-yard run (Mark Jensen kick)	CAL 7-0
1	6:04	USC	Ryan Killeen 34-yard field goal	CAL 7-3
1	2:24	CAL	Terrell Williams 1-yard run (Mark Jensen kick)	CAL 14-3
2	11:42	CAL	Jonathan Makonnen 15-yard pass from Kyle Boller (Mark Jensen kick)	CAL 21-3
2	5:29	USC	Kareem Kelly 6-yard pass from Carson Palmer (Ryan Killeen kick)	CAL 21-10
2	1:06	USC	Mike Williams 21-yard pass from Carson Palmer (Ryan Killeen kick)	CAL 21-17
3	8:38	USC	Sultan McCullough 2-yard run (Ryan Killeen kick)	USC 24-21
4	9:59	USC	Ryan Killeen 32-yard field goal	USC 27-21
4	1:41	USC	Ryan Killeen 18-yard field goal	USC 30-21
4	0:35	CAL	Tom Swoboda 5-yard pass from Kyle Boller (Mark Jensen kick)	USC 30-28

=== No. 22 Washington ===
#22/17 Washington at #19/20 USC

Team	1	2	3	4	Total
No. 22 Huskies	7	0	0	14	21
• No. 19 Trojans	7	10	17	7	41

- Date: October 19
- Location: Los Angeles Memorial Coliseum, Los Angeles
- TV announcers (ABC): Keith Jackson, Dan Fouts & Todd Harris

Scoring summary
1	2:47	USC	Mike Williams 43-yard pass from Carson Palmer (Ryan Killeen kick)	USC 7-0
1	0:04	WASH	Paul Arnold 5-yard pass from Cody Pickett (John Anderson kick)	Tied 7-7
2	10:53	USC	Keary Colbert 61-yard pass from Carson Palmer (Ryan Killeen kick)	USC 14-7
2	6:58	USC	Ryan Killeen 30-yard field goal	USC 17-7
3	9:34	USC	Mike Williams 14-yard pass from Carson Palmer (Ryan Killeen kick)	USC 24-7
3	6:56	USC	Mike Williams 11-yard pass from Carson Palmer (Ryan Killeen kick)	USC 31-7
3	4:56	USC	Ryan Killeen 33-yard field goal	USC 34-7
4	13:30	WASH	Kevin Ware 2-yard pass from Cody Pickett (John Anderson kick)	USC 34-14
4	10:22	WASH	Reggie Williams 27-yard pass from Cody Pickett (John Anderson kick)	USC 34-21
4	3:23	USC	Justin Fargas 13-yard run (Ryan Killeen kick)	USC 41-21

=== at No. 14 Oregon ===
No. 15 USC at No. 14 Oregon

Team	1	2	3	4	Total
• No. 15 Trojans	14	0	20	10	44
No. 14 Ducks	13	6	0	14	33

- Date: October 26
- Location: Autzen Stadium, Eugene, Oregon
- Game attendance: 56,754

=== at Stanford ===
No. 10 USC at Stanford

Team	1	2	3	4	Total
• No. 10 Trojans	14	7	14	14	49
Cardinal	7	3	0	7	17

- Date: October 19
- Location: Stanford Stadium, Palo Alto, California
- Game attendance: 44,950

=== Arizona State ===
Arizona State at No. 8 USC

Team	1	2	3	4	Total
Sun Devils	3	7	3	0	13
• No. 8 Trojans	10	10	0	14	34

- Date: November 16
- Location: Los Angeles Memorial Coliseum, Los Angeles

=== at No. 25 UCLA ===
No. 7 USC at No. 25 UCLA

Team	1	2	3	4	Total
• No. 7 Trojans	21	7	14	10	52
No. 25 Bruins	0	7	0	14	21

- Date: November 23
- Location: Rose Bowl, Pasadena
- Game start: 3:30 p.m. EST
- Elapsed time: 3:26
- Game attendance: 91,084
- Television network: ABC

Scoring summary
1	14:53	USC	Kelly 34-yard passing touchdown from Palmer (Killeen kick)	USC 7–0
1	10:30	USC	Colbert 51-yard passing touchdown from Palmer (Kileen kick)	USC 14–0
1	6:04	USC	Fargas 1-yard run (Killeen kick)	USC 21–0
2	11:40	UCLA	White 7-yard run (Fikse kick)	USC 21–7
2	4:20	USC	MacKenzie 2-yard passing touchdown from Palmer (Killeen kick)	USC 28–7
3	13:45	USC	Colbert34-yard run (Killeen kick)	USC 35–7
3	2:05	USC	Guenther Jr. 3-yard pass from Palmer (Killeen kick)	USC 42–7
4	14:55	USC	Killeen 27-yard field goal	USC 45–7
4	9:30	USC	Dennis 38-yard run (Killeen kick)	USC 52–7
4	2:47	UCLA	White Jr. 10-yard passing touchdown from Moore (Fikse kick)	USC 52–14
4	0:59	UCLA	Lewis 14-yard passing touchdown from Sciarra (Fikse kick)	USC 52–21

- Carson Palmer 19/32, 254 Yds, 4 TD
- Kareem Kelly 4 Rec, 94 Yds, 1 TD

=== No. 7 Notre Dame ===
Team	1	2	3	4	Total
No. 7 Fighting Irish	6	7	0	0	13
• No. 6 Trojans	0	17	13	14	44

- Date: November 30
- Location: Los Angeles Memorial Coliseum, Los Angeles
- Game start: 8:00 p.m. EST
- Elapsed time: 3:26
- Game attendance: 91,432
- Game weather: Cloudy; 60 °F (16 °C); wind variable
- Referee: Chuck McFerrin
- Television network: ABC

Scoring summary
1	4:10	ND	Setta 34-yard field goal	ND 3–0
1	3:46	ND	Setta 32-yard field goal	ND 6–0
2	10:49	USC	Williams 6-yard pass from Palmer (Killeen kick)	USC 7–6
2	3:34	USC	Killeen 22-yard field goal	USC 10–6
2	1:07	ND	Pierre-Antoine recovered blocked punt in end zone (Setta kick)	ND 13–10
2	:05	USC	Williams 19-yard pass from Palmer (Killeen kick)	USC 17–13
3	12:01	USC	MacKenzie 15-yard pass from Palmer (Killeen kick)	USC 24–13
3	6:36	USC	Killeen 27-yard field goal	USC 27–13
3	2:15	USC	Killeen 29-yard field goal	USC 30–13
4	11:58	USC	McCullough 11-yard run (Killeen kick)	USC 37–13
4	7:23	USC	MacKenzie 10-yard pass from Palmer (Killeen kick)	USC 44–13

- Carson Palmer 32/46, 425 Yds
- Justin Fargas 20 Rush, 120 Yds
- Mike Williams 10 Rec, 169 Yds

=== vs. No. 3 Iowa (Orange Bowl) ===
#3/5 Iowa Hawkeyes at #5/4 USC Trojans

Team	1	2	3	4	Total
No. 3 Hawkeyes	10	0	0	7	17
• No. 5 Trojans	7	3	14	14	38

- Date: January 2
- Location: Pro Player Stadium
- Game attendance: 75,971
- TV announcers (ABC): Tim Brant, Ed Cunningham

Scoring summary
1	14:43	IOWA	C.J. Jones 100-yard kickoff return	IOWA 7-0
1	12:46	USC	Justin Fargas 4-yard run	TIED 7-7
1	6:26	IOWA	Nate Kaeding 35-yard field goal	IOWA 10-7
2	1:12	USC	Ryan Killeen 35-yard field goal	TIED 10-10
3	10:14	USC	Mike Williams 18-yard pass from Carson Palmer	USC 17-10
3	4:58	USC	Justin Fargas 50-yard run	USC 24-10
4	14:25	USC	Sultan McCullough 5-yard run	USC 31-10
4	2:36	USC	Sunny Byrd 6-yard run	USC 38-10
4	0:34	IOWA	Maurice Brown 18-yard pass from Brad Banks	USC 38-17

USC played third ranked Iowa in the Orange Bowl. The matchup featured the top two finalists for that season's Heisman Trophy; Trophy winner Carson Palmer and runner up Brad Banks. Banks was the quarterback for the Hawkeyes. The Hawkeyes had only lost one game all year and it was to their rival Iowa State. Iowa opened the play up with a bang and set an Orange Bowl record when C.J. Jones returned the opening kickoff of the game 100 yards for a touchdown. USC responded with a touchdown run on from running back Justin Fargas. Iowa regained the lead with a field goal from Nate Kaeding. USC would kick a field goal in the second quarter to even the score 10-10 at the half. USC came out in the second half and separated themselves from Iowa scoring twice in the third quarter to take a 24-10 lead. The first score was a pass from Palmer to Mike Williams and the second was another run from Fargas. USC ended the third quarter with the ball and scored quickly in the fourth quarter giving them a 31-10 lead. The lead grew when Iowa continued to be unable to do anything with the ball and USC took advantage on a rushing touchdown from fan favorite Sunny Byrd to make the score 38-10. Iowa would score off a touchdown pass from Banks however it was too late. USC would end up winning 38-17.

The Trojans dominated time of possession in the game, having control of the ball for 38:06 seconds. This allowed for the Trojans defense to rest while keeping the Iowa defense out on the field and making them tired. USC's defense did not give up a touchdown to Iowa until the fourth quarter of the game and forced Banks to throw his first interception since October 19.

Statistics	IOWA	USC
First downs	18	30
Total yards	323	550
Rushing yards	119	247
Passing yards	204	303
Turnovers	2	0
Time of possession	21:54	38:06

== 2002 team players in the NFL ==
- Marcell Allmond
- Kevin Arbet
- Collin Ashton
- Darnell Bing
- William Buchanon
- Dominique Byrd
- Matt Cassel
- Shaun Cody
- Keary Colbert
- Justin Fargas
- Matt Grootegoed
- Gregg Guenther
- Alex Holmes
- Norm Katnik
- Kareem Kelly
- Ryan Killeen
- David Kirtman
- Winston Justice
- Jason Leach
- Matt Leinart
- Oscar Lua
- Malaefou MacKenzie
- Tom Malone
- Grant Mattos
- Fred Matua
- Chris McFoy
- Sultan McCullough
- Jason Mitchell
- Carson Palmer
- Mike Patterson
- Troy Polamalu
- LaJuan Ramsey
- Bernard Riley
- Jacob Rogers
- Frostee Rucker
- Dallas Sartz
- Lofa Tatupu
- Kenechi Udeze
- Lenny Vandermade
- John Walker
- Lee Webb
- Kyle Williams
- Mike Williams
- Manuel Wright
- Justin Wyatt
