= Hershel Dennis =

American football player (born 1984)

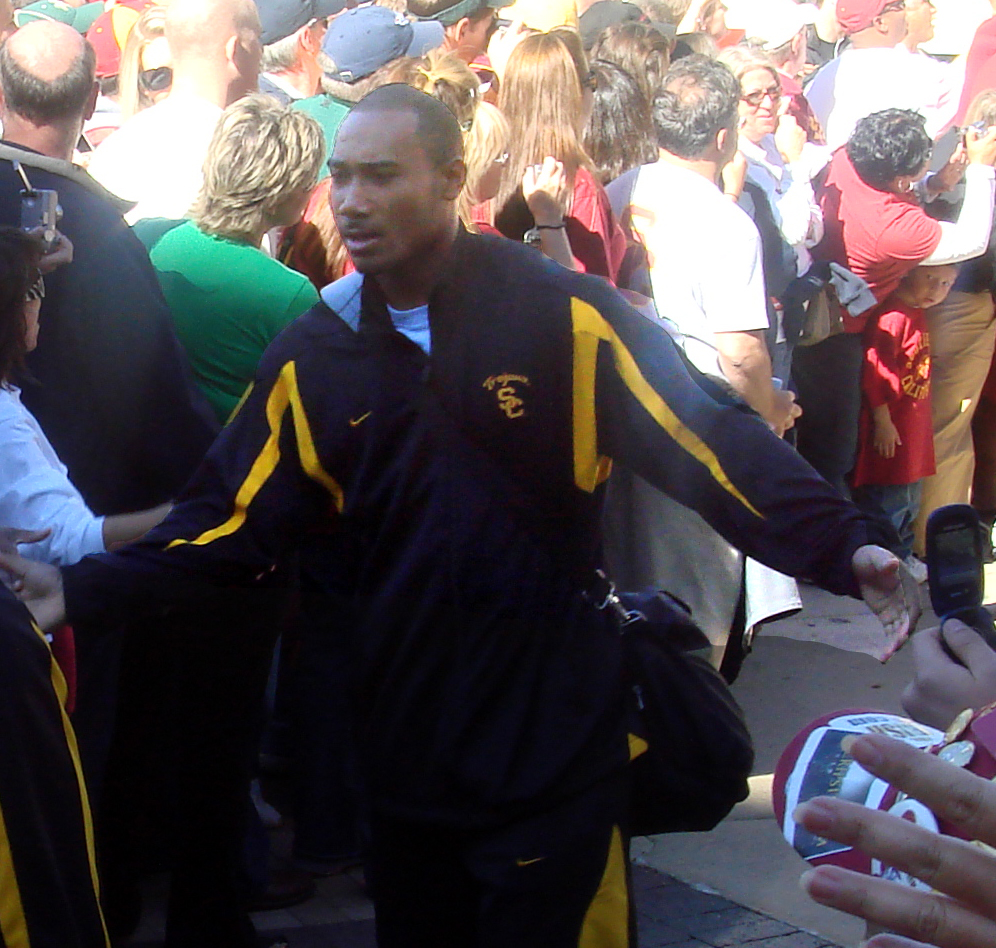
- Dennis walking with the USC Trojans to a stadium before a game

Profile
- Position: Running back

Personal information
- Born: July 12, 1984 (age 42); Long Beach, California, U.S.
- Listed height: 5 ft 11 in (1.80 m)
- Listed weight: 205 lb (93 kg)

Career information
- High school: Long Beach Polytechnic
- College: USC
- NFL draft: 2008: undrafted

Career history
- Sioux Falls Storm (2011)

Awards and highlights
- 2003 AP National Championship; 2004 BCS Championship; United Bowl champion (2011); Glenn Davis Award (2001)

Hershel Henry Dennis IV (born July 12, 1984) is an American former football running back. He played college football as a student athlete at the University of Southern California. During his six-year career, the Trojans went 70–8 making Dennis the first player to play on six Pacific-10 Championship squads and the player with the most wins in college football history. His nickname since childhood is "Patch."

== Early life ==
Dennis prepped at Long Beach Polytechnic High School and was a part of the "Long Beach Poly Five", five highly recruited players including Manuel Wright, Marcedes Lewis, Darnell Bing, and Winston Justice. As of May 2007, Dennis still held the career rushing and touchdown marks at Long Beach Poly, as well as the single season rushing record. Dennis made his final decision between USC and the University of Oregon; his father wanted him to go to Oregon, but he chose USC out of respect for his mother, Rose Teofilo, who wanted him closer to home.

He was also on Poly's track team, with bests of 10.7 seconds in the 100 meters, 22.3 seconds in the 200 meters, 6.75 meters (22.1 feet) in the long jump and 1.98 meters in the high jump, and basketball team. Current Trojans Vincent Joseph, Travon Patterson and Alfred Rowe also prepped at Poly.

== College career ==
As a freshman in the 2002 season, Dennis was a reserve behind a stable of experienced seniors including running backs Justin Fargas and Sultan McCullough as well as fullback/tailbacks Malaefou MacKenzie and Sunny Byrd; however, he did see play time in all 13 games, highlighted by a 38-yard touchdown run against rival UCLA. In 2003, he was the starting tailback in all 13 games over Reggie Bush and LenDale White.

However, Dennis lost the starting spot for the 2004 season, having been suspended from the first two games due to a resulting criminal investigation (that later cleared him of any wrongdoing) and violating team rules. This allowed the tandem of White and Bush to emerge and relegate Dennis to the role of reserve for most of the season. Dennis did appear in a total of 9 games in the 2004 season, but was beset by a serious, season-ending torn knee ligament in practices before the 2005 Orange Bowl. During this period, Dennis considered transferring to another program, but his mother pressured him to stay and graduate as he is the only one of Teofilo's children to have attended a university.

The same torn knee ligament kept Dennis from participating in the entire 2005 season, having already used his redshirt year he lost a year of eligibility. Going into the 2006 season, Dennis was the leading career rusher among current student athletes. Unfortunately, in spring practice Dennis was again beset by season-ending knee injury, causing him to entirely miss a second year in a row. While this would have eliminated his final year of eligibility, Dennis and USC applied to the NCAA for a sixth year of eligibility, given the extreme circumstances. Dennis returned to full-contact practice in the 2007 spring practice In May 2007, Dennis graduated with his bachelor's degree in sociology. The NCAA granted his application for a sixth year of eligibility in June 2007.

During his final game, the 2008 Rose Bowl game against Illinois, Dennis rushed for a touchdown, his first of the season and first since 2004, that led teammates to rush the goal from the sidelines in celebration (and an excessive celebration penalty).

At the end of his six-year USC career, Dennis became the first player to play on six Pac-10 Championship squads. In addition to conference accolades, Dennis also made central contributions to teams that finished in the BCS top 5 during 6 consecutive seasons (2002–07). With 70 wins (and only 8 losses) in that span, Hershel Dennis is the "winningest player" in College Football history.

== Professional career ==
Dennis signed to play with the Sioux Falls Storm as a running back in the Indoor Football League (IFL) during the 2011 season.

== Personal life ==
Dennis is of African-American descent on his father's side and Samoan on his mother's. His father, also named Hershel Dennis, played running back for North Carolina A&T. Dennis has his initials tattooed on the back of his arms above the elbow (left: "H", right: "D"). He has three children.

He is the cousin of Canadian Football League defensive lineman DeQuin Evans, and had been instrumental in obtaining permission for his cousin to sit in on classes at USC, enabling Evans to enroll in college and put his troubled youth behind him via a career in sports.
