= Kennedy Polamalu =

American Samoan football coach (born 1963)

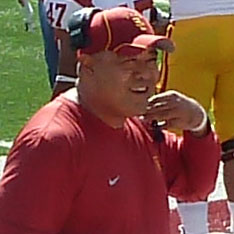

Personal information
- Born: November 22, 1963 (age 62); Pago Pago, American Samoa

Career information
- Position: Fullback
- High school: Mater Dei (Santa Ana, California, U.S.)
- College: USC (1982–1985)

Career history
- UCLA (1992–1993) Graduate assistant; San Diego State (1994–1996) Running backs coach & special teams coordinator; Colorado (1997–1998) Running backs coach; San Diego State (1999) Linebackers coach; USC (2000) Running backs coach; USC (2001) Special teams coordinator; USC (2002–2003) Running backs coach & special teams coordinator; Cleveland Browns (2004) Running backs coach; Jacksonville Jaguars (2005–2009) Running backs coach; USC (2010–2012) Offensive coordinator & running backs coach; UCLA (2014–2015) Running backs coach; UCLA (2016) Offensive coordinator; Minnesota Vikings (2017–2021) Running backs coach; Las Vegas Raiders (2021–2023) Running backs coach; Seattle Seahawks (2024–2025) Running backs coach

Awards and highlights
- Super Bowl champion (LX)

Kennedy Polamalu (born November 22, 1963) is an American Samoan professional football coach who was the running backs coach for the Seattle Seahawks of the National Football League (NFL). Formerly, he served as the running backs coach for the Cleveland Browns, Jacksonville Jaguars, Minnesota Vikings, and Las Vegas Raiders. He was the offensive coordinator for the UCLA Bruins. Prior to that he was the offensive coordinator for the USC Trojans.

== Playing career ==
Polamalu was a fullback at USC from 1982 to 1985. His contributions helped the USC Trojans defeat the Ohio State Buckeyes, 20–17, in the 1985 Rose Bowl.

== Coaching career ==
=== Early coaching career ===
Polamalu coached running backs and special teams for the USC Trojans from 2000 to 2003. He coached Justin Fargas, Hershel Dennis and Tom Malone. Prior to that he coached at the high school level and for University of California, Los Angeles (UCLA), San Diego State University and the University of Colorado at Boulder. He coached the Cleveland Browns in 2004 and the Jacksonville Jaguars from 2005 to 2009. On July 24, 2010, Polamalu accepted a position with USC to become the offensive coordinator. The hiring led Tennessee Titans coach Jeff Fisher to publicly criticize USC head coach, Lane Kiffin, for not following generally accepted National Football League (NFL) protocol: that the head coach or athletic department of the interested team should call the other head coach and let him know that he will be contacting an assistant on their staff. Fisher was upset that Kiffin called and left a voicemail after Polamalu had already accepted the job. Kiffin then explained that he called Polamalu on Friday, July 23, to gauge his interest; after getting Polamalu's positive answer on Saturday, Kiffin called Fisher and left a message. On July 26, 2010, the Titans filed a lawsuit against Kiffin and USC for "maliciously luring" Polamalu away, asking for damages. On December 4, 2013, it was announced that Polamalu was hired to be the running backs coach at UCLA.

In July 2013, Polamalu decided to coach his son at Loyola High School in Los Angeles. He coached the running backs and was the Specials Team Coordinator. He only coached there for a year until he got an offer to coach at UCLA.

=== UCLA ===
On January 13, 2016, UCLA announced that it has promoted Polamalu to offensive coordinator. Following the loss to California on November 26, 2016, Polamalu's contract at UCLA was not renewed.

=== Minnesota Vikings ===
In January 2017, the Minnesota Vikings officially announced the hiring of Polamalu as the team's running back coach. He, along with the rest of the coaching staff was let go after the 2021 season.

=== Las Vegas Raiders ===
In 2022 he became the running backs coach for the Raiders. On February 2 Polamalu was not retained by new Raiders head coach Antonio Pierce and the Raiders after they hired DeShaun Foster as the Raiders' new running backs coach. Foster later backed out to become the head coach of the UCLA Bruins and Polamalu was replaced by Cadillac Williams

=== Seattle Seahawks ===
On February 21, 2024, Polamalu joined head coach Mike Macdonald as the running backs coach for the Seattle Seahawks. On January 13, 2026, Polamalu parted ways with the Seahawks.

== Personal life ==
Polamalu is married to Stephanie Nelson and they share six children K.C., Matthew, Tre, Sophia, Andrew, and Xander. They also have a daughter-in-law Theresa Pola and two grandsons, Tre and Koa. He was born the day President Kennedy was assassinated, and was named in his honor. He graduated from Mater Dei High School in Santa Ana, California, in 1982 where he also played basketball and ran track and field and was Student Body President his senior year.

Polamalu's brother, Aoatoa, played nose tackle at Penn State from 1984 to 1988.

Upon moving to California from American Samoa in the mid-1970s, Kennedy's family shortened their last name to Pola. In 2011, he began the process of legally changing it back to Polamalu while preparing for a return to Samoa. In June, he was part of a contingent that included former USC players Rey Maualuga, Deuce Lutui, Malaefou MacKenzie and others who returned to Samoa for a football camp sponsored by his nephew, former USC Trojans All-American and Pittsburgh Steelers safety Troy Polamalu. His name change became official in August 2011.
