= Kareem Kelly =

American gridiron football player (born 1981)

No. 16
- Position: Wide receiver

Personal information
- Born: April 1, 1981 (age 45); Los Angeles, California, U.S.
- Listed height: 5 ft 11 in (1.80 m)
- Listed weight: 190 lb (86 kg)

Career information
- High school: Long Beach Polytechnic (Long Beach, California)
- College: USC
- NFL draft: 2003: 6th round, 203rd overall pick

Career history
- New Orleans Saints (2003)*; Baltimore Ravens (2003–2004)*; Chicago Bears (2004–2005)*; Los Angeles Avengers (2006); Saskatchewan Roughriders (2006); Las Vegas Locomotives (2010)*
- * Offseason or practice squad member only

Awards and highlights
- Pac-10 Freshman of the Year (1999)

Kareem Kelly (born April 1, 1981) is an American former professional football wide receiver. He was selected by the New Orleans Saints of the National Football League (NFL) in the sixth round of the 2003 NFL draft. He played college football at USC.

He was also a member of the Baltimore Ravens and Chicago Bears of the NFL, the Los Angeles Avengers of the Arena Football League (AFL), the Saskatchewan Roughriders of the Canadian Football League (CFL), and the Las Vegas Locomotives of the United Football League (UFL).

== Early life ==
=== Football ===
He played football at the high school level at Long Beach Polytechnic High School in Long Beach, California. He was a 1998 Super Prep All-American, Prep Star Dream Team Top 100, ESPN Top 100, The Sporting News 101 Prime Prospects, Rivalnet Top 100, USA Today All-USA honorable mention, Super Prep All-Farwest, Prep Star All-Western, Long Beach Press-Telegram Best in the West first-team (unanimous selection), Orange County Register Fab 15 first-team, Tacoma News Tribune Western 100, Las Vegas Sun Super 11 first-team, Cal-Hi Sports All-State second-team, All-CIF Southern Section first-team, All-CIF Division I first-team, Los Angeles Times All-South Coast/Southeast and Long Beach Press-Telegram Dream Team first-team as a senior at Long Beach (Calif.) Poly High. In 1998, he had 50 receptions for 1,096 yards (21.9 avg.) and 17 touchdowns. He had one game with 8 catches for 181 yards and 3 touchdowns. Long Beach Poly was a CIF Division I finalist.

As a 1997 junior, he made All-CIF Southern Section second-team, All-CIF Division I first-team, Long Beach Press-Telegram second-team and All-League while catching 43 passes for 560 yards (13.0 avg.) and 9 touchdowns. Long Beach Poly was the CIF Division I champion. In his 3-year career, his team went 36–5. Former Trojans DeShaun Hill, Mike Pollard, Darrell Rideaux, Hershel Dennis and Winston Justice also prepped at Long Beach Poly.

=== Track ===
He also starred on the schools track team, which won the 1997 and 1998 state titles. As a junior, he was the 1998 state 200-meter champion in a meet-record 20.76 and a member of the state winning 400-meter relay squad. As a senior at the 1999 Arcadia Invitational, he was first in the 200 meters (21.27). At the 1999 CIF Division I meet, he was second in the 100 (10.54) and 200 (21.04), and ran on the winning 400 meter relay quartet. At the 1999 CIF Masters meet, he won the 100 (10.30, tied for 12th in the world on the under-20 windy list in 1999) and 200 (20.61, fourth fastest under-20 windy mark in the world in 1999) and ran a leg on Poly's state record setting victorious 400 meter relay team (40.14). He was the 1999 state champion in the 100 (10.47) and 200 (20.76), and ran a leg on the state meet record setting 400 meter relay squad (40.33). His best times are 10.28 in the 100 meters (the top time in the state in 1998) and 20.53 in the 200.

== College career ==
=== Football ===
Kelly played college football and ran track at the University of Southern California and is #3 on the Trojans all-time receiving list with 204 catches; during his tenure at USC he set the school-record for consecutive games with a catch (48), which has since been broken.

==== Freshman (1999) ====
In 1999, Kelly had the best season that any Pac-10 freshman wide receiver ever had. As the often-used backup to Windrell Hayes (he even started the Oregon State and Arizona games when Hayes was injured), he appeared in all 12 games in 1999 and caught 54 passes (second on USC) for a team-best 902 yards (team-high 16.7 avg.) with 4 touchdowns. He set Pac-10 and USC freshman records for most catches (54, 11th on USC's single season chart) and receiving yards (902, the most by a Trojan since Keyshawn Johnson had 1,434 in 1995). He was third in the Pac-10 in receiving yards (75.2). He was the only Trojan with a catch in every game in 1999. He had 4 outings with 100 receiving yards (104 at University of Hawaii, 100 at Arizona, 129 against Stanford and 170 at Cal). He was named the 1999 Pac-10 Freshman of the Year and to the 1999 The Sporting News Freshman All-American second-team. He also returned 5 punts for 14 yards (2.8 avg.) and ran 2 reverses for 17 yards (8.5 avg.). He began his USC career catching 5 passes for a game-best 104 yards at Hawaii. Against San Diego State, he had 6 catches for 98 yards (both game highs), including a 13-yard touchdown in the fourth quarter (the game's decisive points) as he outleaped an Aztec defender (who ripped off his helmet on the tackle). He had 5 catches for 87 yards at University of Oregon, 3 receptions for 56 yards against Oregon State, and then 6 catches for 100 yards at Arizona. At Notre Dame, he hauled in a 58-yard pass to set up a score. He caught 8 passes for 129 yards (both game bests) against Stanford, then had 9 catches for 170 yards (both career and game bests) with a 72-yard touchdown (a USC 1999 long reception) at Cal. He had 6 catches for 51 yards against Arizona State, added a 10-yard reception at Washington State, had 3 grabs for 32 yards (with a 22-yard touchdown) against UCLA and 1 for 7 yards versus Louisiana Tech.

==== Sophomore (2000) ====
Kelly started at wide receiver as a sophomore in 2000. He started 8 times (Penn State, Colorado, San Jose State, Oregon State, Stanford, Arizona State, UCLA and Notre Dame) at split end and once (California) at flanker. He missed the Arizona game after spraining his ankle and straining his quadriceps at Oregon State. He was the much-used backup in the other 2 games (Oregon and Washington State). Overall in 2000 while appearing in 11 games, he led USC in receptions (55) and yardage (796 yards) for a 14.5 average with 4 touchdowns. He also carried the ball 5 times on reverses for 8 yards (1.6 avg.) and returned 6 punts for 22 yards (3.7 avg.). His 55 catches in 2000 is tied for 10th on USC's season list and is the most ever by a USC sophomore. By the end of 2000, he had 109 career receptions for 1,698 yards, with both marks being the most by a Trojan at the end of his sophomore season. Kelly had 2 catches for 15 yards against Penn State, then a career-best 10 catches for 145 yards (both game highs) against Colorado. Against San Jose State, he had a game-high 7 catches for 106 yards (including a 61-yard touchdown). He had 1 for 11 yards at Oregon State before suffering a strained right quad which sidelined him for the Arizona contest. He returned for the Oregon game and had 3 catches for 45 yards. He had a team-best 4 catches for 51 yards at Stanford, then a game-high 5 catches for 42 yards against California (he also had 2 carries for 8 yards) and 6 receptions for a game-high 85 yards at Arizona State. He had a game-high 7 catches for 114 yards (with a 34-yard touchdown) against Washington State, then a game-high 6 catches for 91 yards (with a 39-yard touchdowns) at UCLA and 4 catches for a game-best 91 yards (with a 59-yard touchdowns) against Notre Dame.

==== Junior (2001) ====
Kelly started for his third season at wide receiver (split end) as a junior in 2001. Overall in 2001 while appearing in all 12 games (he did not start against Arizona State and Arizona, but did play), he had a team-best 49 receptions for 801 yards (16.3 avg.) with 3 touchdowns, plus ran for 38 yards on 6 reverses (6.3 avg.) and returned 8 punts for 51 yards (6.4 avg.). He had a pair of 100-yard receiving games in 2001 (165 yards at Oregon and 127 yards versus Arizona State). He was on the "Watch List" for the 2001 Biletnikoff Award, given to the nation's top receiver. He had 3 catches for 18 yards in the San Jose State opener and returned a punt 10 yards, then added 7 grabs for 75 yards (both game bests) against Kansas State. He had 4 catches for a game-high 165 yards at Oregon, including a 93-yard touchdown (the longest catch of his career). He had a game-high 6 receptions for 46 yards against Stanford. At Washington, he caught 3 passes for 93 yards, including a 58-yard touchdown. He added 5 receptions for 127 yards (both game highs) versus Arizona State, 2 catches for 16 yards at Notre Dame, 5 grabs for 64 yards (both team bests) at Arizona and 5 catches for 73 yards (both team highs) against Oregon State. At California, he caught a team-best 4 passes for a game-high 88 yards, including a 5-yard touchdown, and also ran 2 reverses for 23 yards. He caught 2 passes for 3 yards against UCLA and ran 2 reverses for 6 yards. He added a team-high 3 receptions for 33 yards (with a 22-yarder) against Utah.

==== Senior (2002) ====
Kelly started for his fourth year at wide receiver as a senior in 2002. He also returned punts. He made 2002 All-Pac-10 honorable mention. Overall in 2002 while appearing in all 13 games, he had 46 receptions for 605 yards (13.2 avg.) with 4 touchdowns, plus he had a 1-yard run on a reverse and returned 11 punts for 76 yards (6.9 avg.). He did not start 2 mid-season games (Washington and Oregon), but he did play in those contests. He missed part of 2002 spring practice with a hamstring strain. He also has sprinted for the USC track team. He caught a game-best 6 passes for 66 yards with a touchdown against Auburn and also returned 2 punts for 0 yards. He had 4 catches for 36 yards at Colorado and returned 4 punts for 31 yards. At Kansas State, he caught 3 passes for 42 yards and returned a punt 19 yards. He had a 6-yard catch against Oregon State. He had a game-best 8 catches for 66 yards at Washington State. He caught 3 passes for 19 yards against California, including a 6-yard touchdown. He caught a 16-yard pass against Washington. At Oregon, he had 6 receptions for 94 yards, with a 31-yard touchdown. He had 3 receptions for 69 yards (including a 50-yarder) at Stanford. He had an 11-yard catch versus Arizona State. At UCLA, he had 4 catches for a game-high 94 yards and leaped high for a 34-yard touchdown catch on the game's first play. He had 3 catches for 12 yards against Notre Dame to get a share of the USC career reception record and the Pac-10 and NCAA records for consecutive games with a reception (he also returned 2 punts for 11 yards). Against Iowa in the Orange Bowl, he had 3 catches for 74 yards (including a 65-yarder on USC's first play to set up a touchdown) to set an NCAA record for consecutive games with a catch (47) en route to becoming Troy's career reception leader (204). He was invited to play in the 2003 East-West Shrine Game.

==== Career ====
Kelly owns USC's career pass catching record (204 receptions, which was broken the next year by Keary Colbert). He is second on the USC list for receiving yards (3,104), behind Johnnie Morton's 3,201. He had a catch in all 48 games he played as a Trojan, tying the Pac-10 record with Keenan Howry of Oregon, which has since been broken by Michael Larkin of Miami University.

=== Track ===
Kelly also sprinted for the USC track team.

==== Sophomore (2000) ====
In the spring of 2000, he competed in February and March before having to sit out because of eligibility reasons. In his Trojan sprinting debut, he clocked a world junior record and American collegiate record 5.67 to place second in the 50-meter dash in the Los Angeles Indoor Invitational (it was tied for the ninth fastest time in the world in 2000). He then won a heat in the 100 meters at the Trojan Invitational in 10.33 and was fifth in the 100 meters at the ASU USTCA Invitational in 10.57. He also anchored the victorious 400-meter relay teams at the Trojan Invitational (clocking a 40.08) and USC's Centennial Invitational (39.18). He qualified for the World Junior Championships in the 100 and 200.

==== Junior (2001) ====
In the spring of 2001, he competed in a pair of March meets before spring football practice began. He won his heat in the 100 meters (10.53) at the Trojan Invitational. He also anchored USC's victorious 400-meter relay squads at the Trojan Invitational (40.29) and the USC-LSU Dual Meet (39.39). He did not return to the track squad after spring football drills because of a slight hamstring strain.

==== Senior (2002) ====
In the spring of 2002, his only track appearance came as the anchor leg on USC's sprint relay team at the NCAA meet which finished fifth in 39.27 (the squad also was third in its heat in 39.28).

== Professional career ==
Kelly was selected in the 2003 NFL draft by the New Orleans Saints. Kelly played in all four preseason games, but was released prior to the start of the regular season. He was on the practice squads of the Baltimore Ravens and Chicago Bears. He signed a two-year contract with the Los Angeles Avengers of the Arena Football League on November 2, 2005. While with the Avengers he was one of 45 former Trojan teammates on the roster: fullback/linebacker Lonnie Ford and offensive/defensive lineman Bernard Riley. He signed with the Saskatchewan Roughriders of the Canadian Football League in May 2006, but was cut. He later retired from football but returned to sign a contract with the Las Vegas Locomotives of the United Football League in 2010. He was released in July 2010.

== Personal life ==
Kareem later opened a full-service laundromat, International Wash, in Compton, California.
