= Polamalu =

Polamalu is a surname. Notable people with the surname include:

- Kennedy Polamalu (born 1963), American Samoan football coach
- Troy Polamalu (born 1981), American football player and executive
