= Darnell Bing =

American football player (born 1984)

No. 46, 52
- Position: Linebacker

Personal information
- Born: September 10, 1984 (age 42); Long Beach, California, U.S.
- Listed height: 6 ft 2 in (1.88 m)
- Listed weight: 230 lb (104 kg)

Career information
- High school: Long Beach Polytechnic
- College: USC
- NFL draft: 2006: 4th round, 101st overall pick

Career history
- Oakland Raiders (2006); San Francisco 49ers (2007)*; New York Jets (2008)*; Detroit Lions (2008–2009); Houston Texans (2009–2010); Virginia Destroyers (2011)
- * Offseason or practice squad member only

Awards and highlights
- UFL champion (2011); First-team All-American (2005); First-team All-Pac-10 (2005); Second-team All-Pac-10 (2004)

Career NFL statistics
- Total tackles: 5
- Fumble recoveries: 1
- Stats at Pro Football Reference

Darnell Bing (born September 10, 1984) is an American former professional football player who was a linebacker in the National Football League (NFL). He was selected by the Oakland Raiders in the fourth round of the 2006 NFL draft. He played college football for the USC Trojans.

Bing was also a member of the San Francisco 49ers, New York Jets, Detroit Lions, and Houston Texans.

== Early life ==
Bing attended Long Beach Polytechnic High School. He was a part of a Poly team that had five players ranked in the top 100 in the nation according to Rivals.com: tight end Marcedes Lewis, offensive tackle Winston Justice, defensive tackle Manuel Wright, running back Hershel Dennis and himself. Bing was a member of the USC football team in college along with all of these high school teammates, except for Lewis who played for USC's crosstown archrival, UCLA.

== College career ==
Bing played safety for the USC Trojans, and received permission from USC athletic director Mike Garrett (USC's 1965 Heisman Trophy-winning tailback) to wear Garrett's retired No. 20 jersey. He was ruled academically ineligible his first year, but Bing started on all three other years of his collegiate career and was on two national championship teams. He was named a Jim Thorpe Award finalist as the nation's best collegiate football defensive back and an All-American in 2005. He was an early entry candidate in the 2006 NFL Draft, winding up in the fourth round.

In his final season at Southern California, Bing had an interception in the final minutes of the game against Fresno State that sealed the win for the Trojans.

=== Awards and honors ===
- Honorable mention All-Pac-10 (2003)
- Sporting News Pac-10 Freshman of the Year (2003)
- Sporting News Freshman All-American (2003)
- Second-team All-Pac-10 (2004)
- First-team All-Pac-10 (2005)
- First-team AP All-American (2005)
- Jim Thorpe Award semifinalist (2005)
- Lott Trophy quarterfinalist (2005)

== Professional career ==
Pre-draft measurables
Height	Weight	Arm length	Hand span	40-yard dash	20-yard shuttle	Three-cone drill	Vertical jump	Broad jump	Bench press
6 ft 2 in (1.88 m)	227 lb (103 kg)	31 5/8 in (0.80 m)	10 in (0.25 m)	4.53 s	4.07 s	7.25 s	38.0 in (0.97 m)	10 ft 4 in (3.15 m)	21 reps
All values from NFL Combine/Pro Day

=== Oakland Raiders ===
Bing was selected by the Oakland Raiders in the fourth round with the 101st pick of the 2006 NFL draft. Although he was a safety in college, the Oakland Raiders planned to convert him to an outside linebacker, but before the 2007 season they moved him back to safety. Prior to the 2006 season, the Raiders placed Bing on the injured reserve list with a neck injury. On July 25, 2007, the Raiders released him.

=== San Francisco 49ers ===
The San Francisco 49ers claimed Bing off waivers on July 26, 2007. They released him on September 1 and re-signed him to the practice squad, where he spent the entire 2007 season.

=== New York Jets ===
On January 9, 2008, the New York Jets signed Bing to a future contract. He was waived by the team on July 29.

=== Detroit Lions ===
Bing was signed by the Detroit Lions on August 4, 2008, after the team placed linebacker Teddy Lehman on injured reserve. As the Raiders had unsuccessfully tried, the Lions also converted him to linebacker. He began the season on the team's practice squad before being promoted to the active roster on December 8, 2008, when linebacker Alex Lewis was placed on injured reserve. He was released on October 6, 2009.

=== Houston Texans ===
Bing signed a contract for the 2010 season on January 8, 2010. He was released at the end of the preseason and signed to the practice squad on October 14. On February 18, 2011, Bing was released from the Texans roster.
