= 2008 Rose Bowl =

American college football game

2008 Rose Bowl presented by Citi
- 94th Rose Bowl Game
| Illinois Fighting Illini | USC Trojans |
| (9–3) | (10–2) |
| Big Ten | Pac-10 |
| 17 | 49 |
| Head coach: Ron Zook | Head coach: Pete Carroll |
| AP / Coaches / BCS; 13 / 13 / 13 | AP / Coaches / BCS; 6 / 6 / 7 |
| | 1 | 2 | 3 | 4 | Total |
|---|---|---|---|---|---|
| Illinois | 0 | 3 | 7 | 7 | 17 |
| USC | 14 | 7 | 14 | 14 | 49 |
- Date: January 1, 2008
- Season: 2007
- Stadium: Rose Bowl
- Location: Pasadena, California
- MVP: Offensive: John David Booty (USC QB); Defensive: Rey Maualuga (USC LB)
- Favorite: USC by 13.5
- National anthem: Spirit of Troy
- Referee: Dennis Hennigan (Big East)
- Halftime show: Marching Illini; Spirit of Troy
- Attendance: 93,923
- Payout: US$17 million per team

United States TV coverage
- Network: ESPN on ABC
- Announcers: Brent Musburger (play-by-play); Kirk Herbstreit (analyst); Lisa Salters (sideline)
- Nielsen ratings: 11.11

International TV coverage
- Network: ESPN Radio
- Announcers: Dave Barnett (play-by-play); Rod Gilmore (analyst); Erin Andrews (sideline)

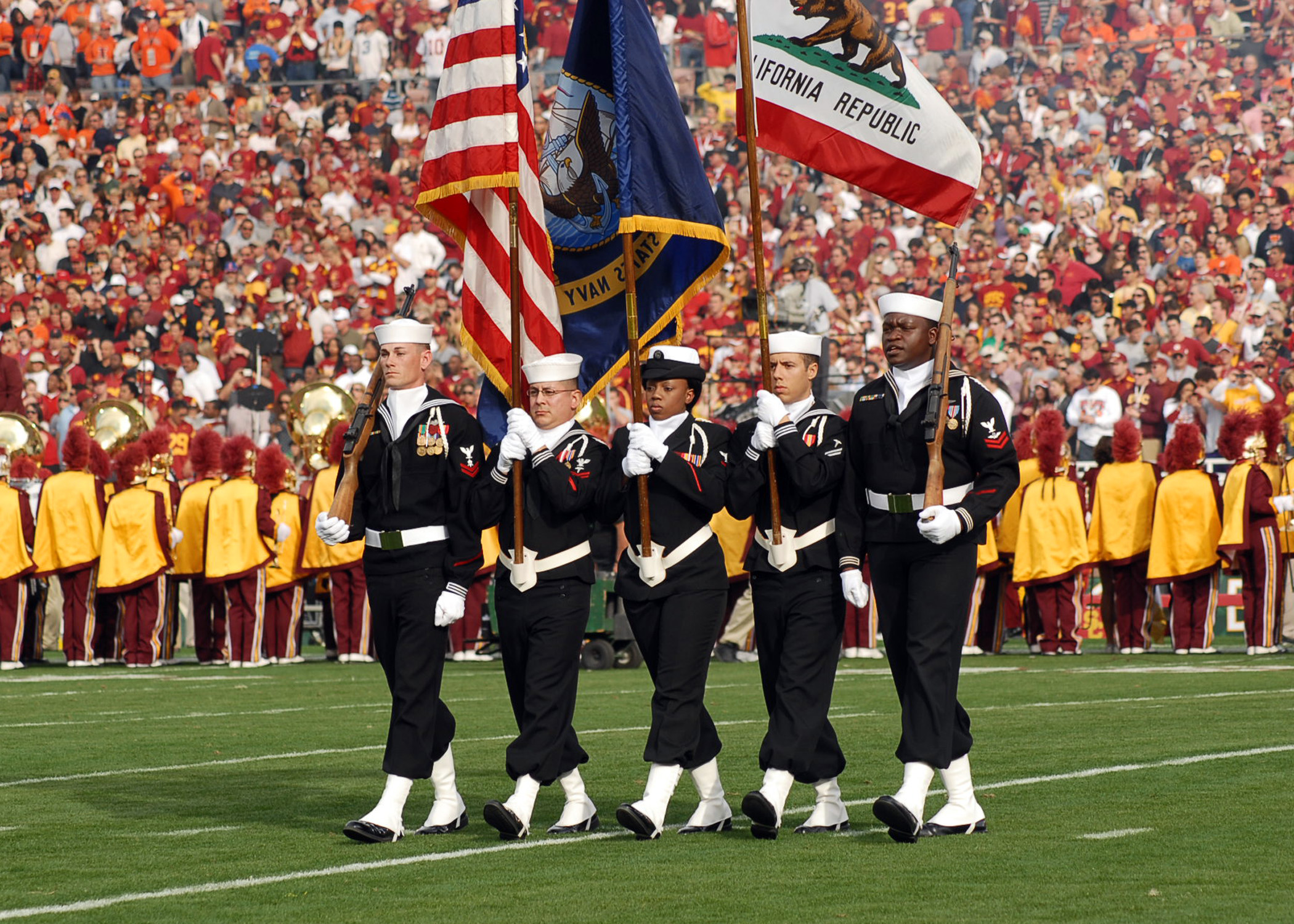
The Naval Base Ventura County Honor Guard parades the colors as the University of Southern California Marching Band performed the national anthem during the 2008 Rose Bowl game.

The 2008 Rose Bowl Game presented by Citi, the 94th Rose Bowl Game, played on January 1, 2008, at the Rose Bowl Stadium in Pasadena, California, was a college football bowl game. The contest was televised on ABC, the 20th straight year the network aired the Rose Bowl, starting at 4:30pm EST. The game's main sponsor was Citi.

The 2008 Rose Bowl featured the 7th-ranked USC Trojans hosting the 13th-ranked Illinois Fighting Illini. As with the previous year's game, the contest was a semi-traditional Rose Bowl in that while it was a Big Ten versus Pac-10 matchup, the Big Ten representative was an at-large team because the conference champion, Ohio State, which lost to Illinois earlier in the season, was selected to play in the BCS National Championship Game.

USC was making its third straight appearance in the Rose Bowl, while Illinois had not played in the game since 1984. Though Illinois won the Big Ten Conference title in 2001, the then-rotating BCS title game moved them to the Sugar Bowl.

== Game summary ==
USC took an early 21–0 lead, including a touchdown pass by backup quarterback Garrett Green on a trick play. Illinois verged on closing to 21–10 midway through the third quarter, but receiver Jacob Willis fumbled into the end zone after a catch and Trojans linebacker Brian Cushing recovered for a touchback. USC converted that miscue into a touchdown and then cornerback Cary Harris intercepted Illinois quarterback Juice Williams's pass on the first play of the ensuing possession. Five plays later, Trojans freshman Joe McKnight scored on a 6-yard run, making the score 35–10. USC gained a Rose Bowl-record 633 yards of offense in defeating Illinois 49–17.

=== Scoring summary ===
| Plays | Yards | Scoring Play | Time | Score |
|---|---|---|---|---|
1st quarter
| 9 | 72 | USC - Chauncey Washington, 8-yard pass from John David Booty (David Buehler kick) | 2:12 | ILL 0 - USC 7 |
| 1 | 34 | USC - Desmond Reed, 34-yard pass from Garrett Green (David Buehler kick) | 0:09 | ILL 0 - USC 14 |
2nd quarter
| 6 | 43 | USC - Chauncey Washington, 3-yard run (David Buehler kick) | 2:10 | ILL 0 - USC 21 |
| 12 | 69 | ILL - Jason Reda, 28-yard field goal | 1:43 | ILL 3 - USC 21 |
3rd quarter
| 2 | 88 | ILL - Rashard Mendenhall, 79-yard run (Jason Reda kick) | 0:47 | ILL 10 - USC 21 |
| 8 | 80 | USC - Fred Davis, 2-yard pass from John David Booty (David Buehler kick) | 2:06 | ILL 10 - USC 28 |
| 5 | 68 | USC - Joe McKnight, 6-yard run (David Buehler kick) | 1:21 | ILL 10 - USC 35 |
4th quarter
| 8 | 67 | USC - David Ausberry, 15-yard pass from John David Booty (David Buehler kick) | 3:06 | ILL 10 - USC 42 |
| 6 | 87 | USC - Hershel Dennis, 3-yard run (David Buehler kick) | 1:04 | ILL 10 - USC 49 |
| 3 | 63 | ILL - Arrelious Benn, 56-yard pass from Eddie McGee (Jason Reda kick) | 1:11 | ILL 17 - USC 49 |

== Game records ==
| Team | Performance vs. Opponent | Year |
|---|---|---|
| Most points scored | 49, USC vs. Illinois (tied with 2 others) - supplanted by Oregon in 2015 | 2008 |
| Total yards | 633, USC vs. Illinois | 2008 |

Most TD passes career, Rose Bowl History- 7, John David Booty
