= Fred Davis (tight end) =

American football player (born 1986)

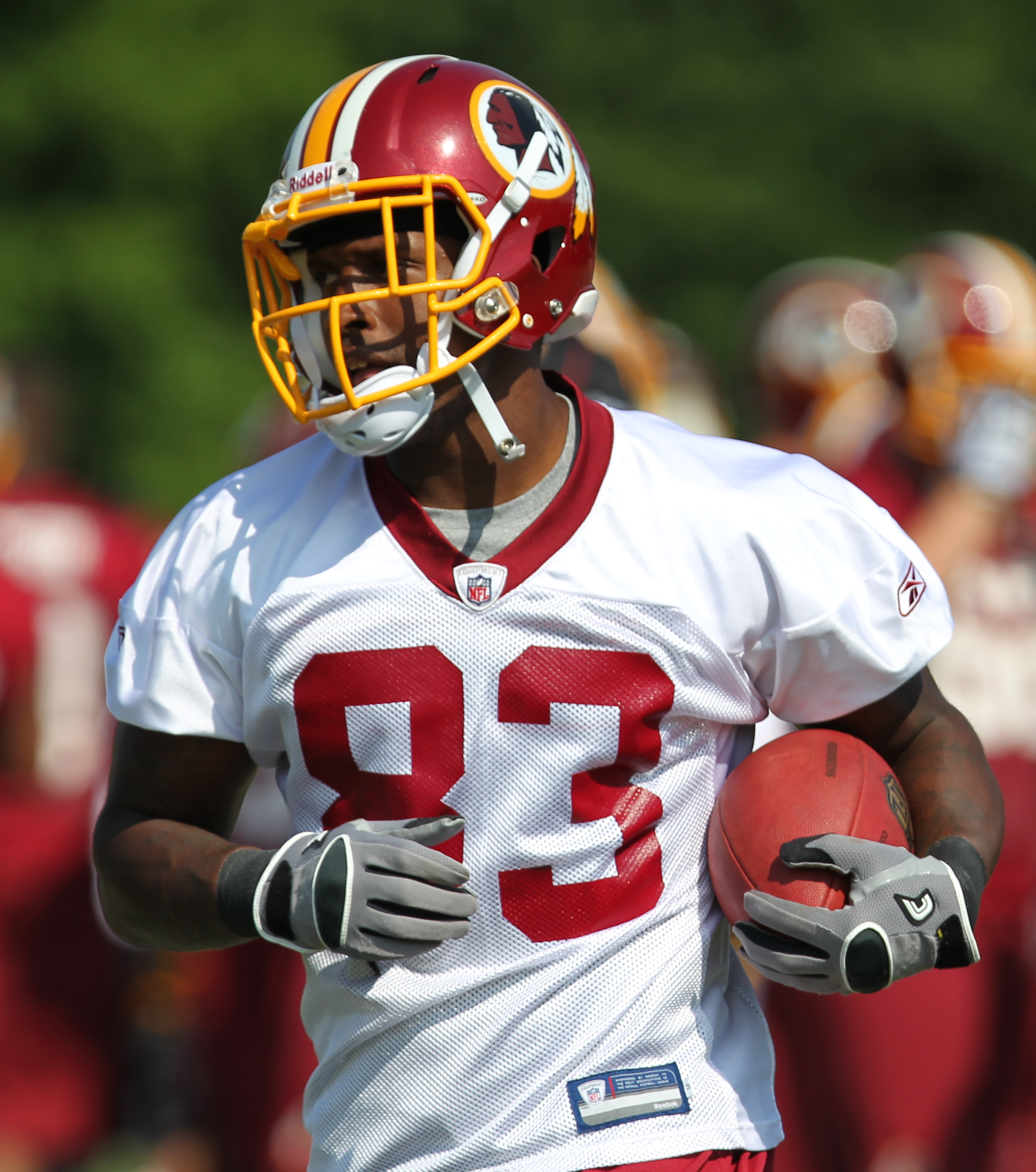
- Davis with the Washington Redskins in 2011

No. 83, 86
- Position: Tight end

Personal information
- Born: January 15, 1986 (age 40); Toledo, Ohio, U.S.
- Listed height: 6 ft 3 in (1.91 m)
- Listed weight: 247 lb (112 kg)

Career information
- High school: Rogers (Toledo)
- College: USC (2004–2007)
- NFL draft: 2008: 2nd round, 48th overall pick

Career history
- Washington Redskins (2008–2013); New England Patriots (2015)*
- * Offseason or practice squad member only

Awards and highlights
- John Mackey Award (2007); First-team All-American (2007); First-team All-Pac-10 (2007)

Career NFL statistics
- Receptions: 162
- Receiving yards: 2,043
- Receiving touchdowns: 13
- Stats at Pro Football Reference

Frederick Martin Davis (born January 15, 1986) is an American former professional football player who was a tight end for the Washington Redskins (now Commanders) of the National Football League (NFL). He was selected by Washington in the second round of the 2008 NFL draft. He played college football for the USC Trojans, earning first-team All-American honors and winning the John Mackey Award as the nation's top tight end in 2007.

== Early life ==
Davis prepped at Rogers High School in Toledo. He was on the USA Today All-USA second-team. According to Scout.com, Davis was rated the second best wide receiver in his recruiting class coming out of high school. Davis played in the 2004 U.S. Army All-American Bowl.

As a high school junior, Davis considered attending Ohio State University because it was the first program to offer him an athletic scholarship. His senior season resulted in many other offers, with USC winning out with a combination of weather, location, coaches, quality players and a style of offense that suited Davis; he conversed the matter over with fellow recruit Dwayne Jarrett before they both decided to join the Trojans.

== College career ==
Davis graduated from Robert S. Rogers High School in Toledo, OH, a semester early to start spring training with the Trojans. Tired of the recruiting process that accompanies top prospects, Davis secretly left Ohio to enroll at USC. Recruited as a wide receiver, he showed solid speed and raw athletic ability but lacked the route-running skills and ball-catching ability of other receivers. After consulting with then-offensive coordinator Norm Chow, Davis decided to try converting to tight end.

His freshman year, Davis contributed as a reserve to the eventual-national champion 2004 USC Trojans football team, playing in nine games and catching four passes behind fellow tight ends Dominique Byrd and Alex Holmes. However, because of repeated incidences of tardiness, reporting late after trips back to Ohio, Davis was not allowed to travel with the Trojans to the BCS National Championship Game in the 2005 Orange Bowl. Davis reapplied himself the next season, catching 13 passes in 13 games during the 2005 season, including two in the 2006 Rose Bowl. During the 2006 season, Davis started ten games and caught 38 passes for 352 yards and three touchdowns.

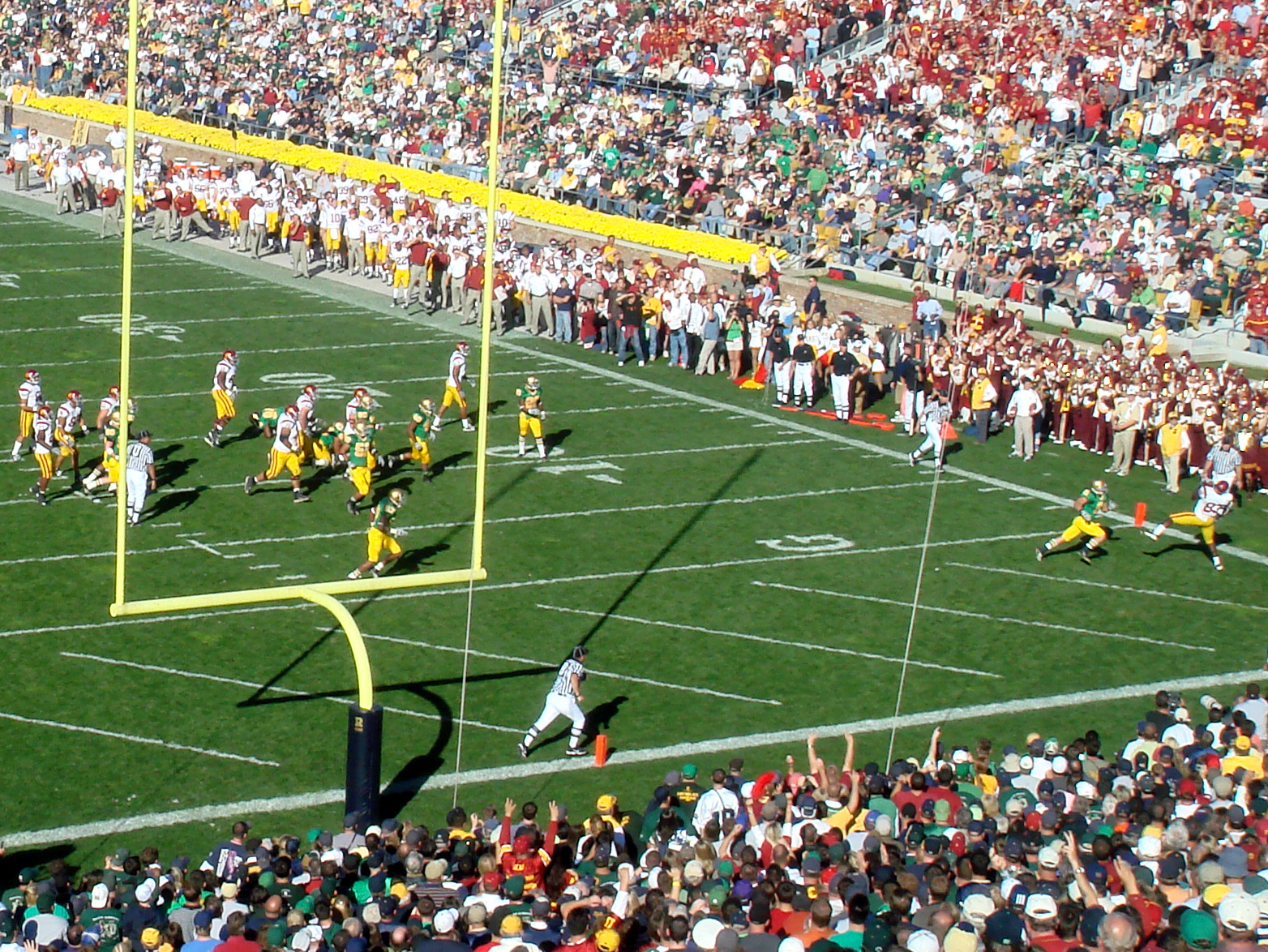
Fred Davis comes down with a one-handed touchdown against the Notre Dame Fighting Irish

Davis was a preseason team All-Pacific-10 Conference player prior to 2007 and was considered a likely high draft choice for the 2008 NFL draft. He was on the 2007 Mackey Award watch list. Against Washington State, Davis had the best game of his career, with nine receptions for 124 yards and two touchdowns. The performance marked the most yards receiving ever in a game by a Trojans tight end. Prior to that, Davis had never caught more than six passes or gained more than 68 receiving yards in a game.

At the end of the 2007 regular season, Davis was selected to the All-Pac-10 Conference first-team by league coaches. He was also selected to the SI.com All-American Second-team. Davis became the first USC player to win the Mackey Award as the nation's top tight end. When asked his favorite game as a USC player, Davis noted the 2006 Rose Bowl.

== Professional career ==
=== Washington Redskins ===
==== 2008 season ====
Davis was drafted in the second round of the 2008 NFL draft by the Washington Redskins. On May 4, the last day of the Redskins mini-camp, Davis overslept and missed the morning practice. On July 19, Davis received a four-year contract from the Redskins worth $3.5 million, including $1.8 million in bonus money.

Davis was not much of a factor during the 2008 season, partially due to the lack of playing time, for the Washington Redskins. He caught three passes for 27 yards.

==== 2009 season ====
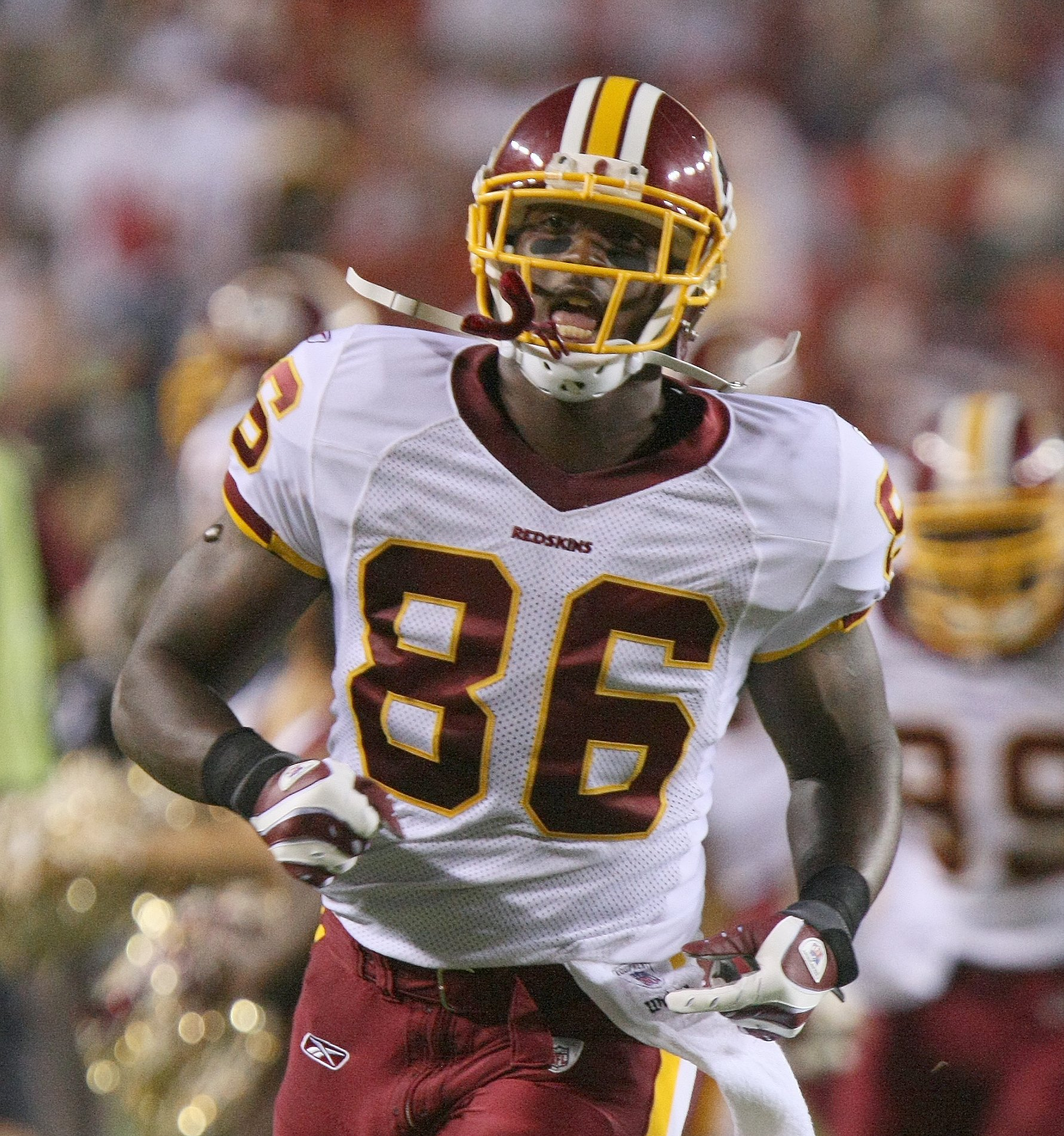
Davis in the 2009 preseason wearing his original jersey #86.

During the 2009 season, in a Week 7 game vs. the Philadelphia Eagles, Davis caught his first touchdown and recorded a career-high 7 catches for 78 yards. Davis was playing first-string tight end for most of this game due to an injury to starter Chris Cooley. He finished the season with 48 receptions for 509 yards and 6 touchdowns.

==== 2010 season ====
In the 2010 season, Davis had 21 receptions for 316 receiving yards. He played in all 16 games of the season and started 9 of them.

==== 2011 season ====
During the 2011 preseason, Davis switched from his original jersey number of 86 to 83. In the 2011 season, Davis would eventually become the starting tight end after starter, Chris Cooley, was placed on injured reserve. In Week 14, Davis and teammate, Trent Williams, were suspended for four games after repeatedly failing league drug tests. Starting in 12 games, he finished the season recording career highs of 59 receptions and 796 yards, as well as having three touchdowns. Despite his suspension, he was named the Redskins' 2011 Offensive Player of Year.

==== 2012 season ====
On March 2, 2012, the Washington Redskins placed the non-exclusive franchise tag on Davis. On March 16, 2012, he signed his one-year, franchise-player tender contract worth $5.446 million. After the release of Chris Cooley, he was officially named the Redskins' starting tight end. In the Week 7 game against the New York Giants, Davis tore his Achilles tendon in the first half, ending his 2012 season. Cooley was eventually brought back to replace Davis. He finished the season with 325 yards on 24 receptions and no touchdowns.

==== 2013 season ====
On February 26, 2013, Davis was officially cleared by medical personnel to play. Set to become an unrestricted agent, he re-signed with the Redskins on March 29 to a one-year contract. Before Davis could test the upcoming free agent market for the 2014 season, he was suspended indefinitely by the NFL for violating their substance-abuse policy.

=== New England Patriots ===
==== 2015 season ====
On May 1, 2015, Davis was reinstated by the league after being suspended for roughly a year. On May 11, 2015, Davis signed a one-year contract with the New England Patriots. On June 19, 2015, Davis was released.

== NFL career statistics ==
Legend
**Bold**	Career high

Year	Team	Games		Receiving					
Year	Team	GP	GS	Tgt	Rec	Yds	Avg	Lng	TD
2008	WAS	11	2	10	3	27	9.0	15	0
2009	WAS	**16**	10	76	48	509	10.6	29	**6**
2010	WAS	**16**	9	30	21	316	**15.0**	**71**	3
2011	WAS	12	**12**	**88**	**59**	**796**	13.5	42	3
2012	WAS	7	7	31	24	325	13.5	29	0
2013	WAS	10	3	18	7	70	10.0	23	1
Career		72	43	253	162	2,043	12.6	71	13

== Personal ==
On January 10, 2011, a woman by the name of Makini R. Chaka filed a civil lawsuit against Davis for an altercation that occurred between the two at a nightclub in Washington, D.C. Davis was accused of assaulting Chaka by dumping his drink on her. The civil case is closed. During the September 17, 2013 ruling, Judge Laura Cordero wrote that Chaka "has established by a preponderance of evidence that Defendant Fred Davis assaulted and battered her."

The judge awarded Chaka $186 in medical damages, $575 to compensate for damage to "her boots, her dress, [and] her hair weave." The judge also awarded Chaka $9,000 in lost earnings and $10,000 in pain and suffering.

On July 23, 2014, D.C. police announced that there was a warrant for Davis' arrest for assaulting his ex-girlfriend on June 2. The next day, Davis surrendered himself to the police. The charges were dropped on August 27, 2014 due to insufficient evidence.
