= 2003 All-Pacific-10 Conference football team =

The 2003 All-Pacific-10 Conference football team consists of American football players chosen for All-Pacific-10 Conference teams for the 2003 Pacific-10 Conference football season.

== Offensive selections ==
=== Quarterbacks ===
- Matt Leinart, USC (Coaches-1)
- Cody Pickett, Washington (Coaches-2)
- Matt Kegel, Washington St. (Coaches-2)

=== Running backs ===
- Steven Jackson, Oregon St. (Coaches-1)
- Adimchinobe Echemandu, California (Coaches-1)
- Jonathan Smith, Washington St. (Coaches-2)
- Mike Bell, Arizona (Coaches-2)

=== Wide receivers ===
- Mike Williams, USC (Coaches-1)
- James Newson, Oregon St. (Coaches-1)
- Reggie Williams, Washington (Coaches-1)
- Keary Colbert, USC (Coaches-2)
- Geoff McArthur, California (Coaches-2)

=== Tight ends ===
- Tim Euhus, Oregon St. (Coaches-1)
- Troy Bienemann, Washington St. (Coaches-2)

=== Offensive linemen ===
- Jacob Rogers, USC (Coaches-1)
- Mark Wilson, California (Coaches-1)
- Norm Katnik, USC (Coaches-1)
- Josh Parrish, Washington St. (Coaches-1)
- Adam Snyder, Oregon (Coaches-1)
- Regis Crawford, Arizona St. (Coaches-2)
- Kirk Chambers, Stanford (Coaches-2)
- Doug Nienhuis, Oregon St. (Coaches-2)
- Grayling Love, Arizona St. (Coaches-2)
- Nick Newton, Washington (Coaches-2)

== Defensive selections ==
=== Defensive linemen ===
- Dave Ball, UCLA (Coaches-1)
- Kenechi Udeze, USC (Coaches-1)
- Shaun Cody, USC (Coaches-1)
- Mike Patterson, USC (Coaches-1)
- Terry Johnson, Washington (Coaches-2)
- D. D. Acholonu, Washington St. (Coaches-2)
- Dwan Edwards, Oregon St. (Coaches-2)
- Igor Olshansky, Oregon (Coaches-2)

=== Linebackers ===
- Brandon Chillar, UCLA (Coaches-1)
- Richard Seigler, Oregon St. (Coaches-1)
- Will Derting, Washington St. (Coaches-1)
- Kevin Mitchell, Oregon (Coaches-2)
- Don Jackson, Washington St. (Coaches-2)
- Matt Grootegoed, USC (Coaches-2)

=== Defensive backs ===
- Jason David, Washington St. (Coaches-1)
- Will Poole, USC (Coaches-1)
- Erik Coleman, Washington St. (Coaches-1)
- Keith Lewis, Oregon (Coaches-1)
- Donnie McCleskey, California (Coaches-1)
- Brandon Browner, Oregon St. (Coaches-2)
- Riccardo Stewart, Arizona St. (Coaches-2)
- Oshiomogho Atogwe, Stanford (Coaches-2)

== Special teams ==
=== Placekickers ===
- Drew Dunning, Washington St. (Coaches-1)
- Kirk Yliniemi, Oregon St. (Coaches-2)

=== Punters ===
- Tom Malone, USC (Coaches-1)
- Eric Johnson, Stanford (Coaches-2)

=== Return specialists/All purpose ===
- Kenny Washington, Oregon (Coaches-1)
- Charles Frederick, Washington (Coaches-1)
- Keith Lewis, Oregon (Coaches-1)
- Sammy Moore, Washington St. (Coaches-2)
- Luke Powell, Stanford (Coaches-2)
- Jason Shivers, Arizona St. (Coaches-2)

== See also ==
- 2003 College Football All-America Team
