= 2005 Orange Bowl =

College football bowl game and BCS National Championship

2005 FedEx Orange Bowl
- BCS National Championship Game; 71st Orange Bowl
Oklahoma Sooners	USC Trojans
(12–0)	(12–0 (Note: After an investigation into the eligibility of Reggie Bush, USC later vacated 1 regular season win, as well as this game, for an official 11–0 record.))
Big 12	Pac-10
19	55
Head coach: Bob Stoops	Head coach: Pete Carroll
AP / Coaches / BCS; 2 / 2 / 2	AP / Coaches / BCS; 1 / 1 / 1
	1	2	3	4	Total
Oklahoma	7	3	0	9	19
USC	14	24	10	7	55
- Date: January 4, 2005
- Season: 2004
- Stadium: Pro Player Stadium
- Location: Miami Gardens, Florida
- MVP: USC QB Matt Leinart
- Favorite: USC by 3 (54)
- National anthem: JoJo
- Referee: Steve Shaw (SEC)
- Halftime show: Kelly Clarkson, Trace Adkins, Ashlee Simpson
- Attendance: 77,912

United States TV coverage
- Network: ABC
- Announcers: Brad Nessler (play-by-play); Bob Griese (analyst); Lynn Swann (sideline); Todd Harris (sideline)
- Nielsen ratings: 13.7

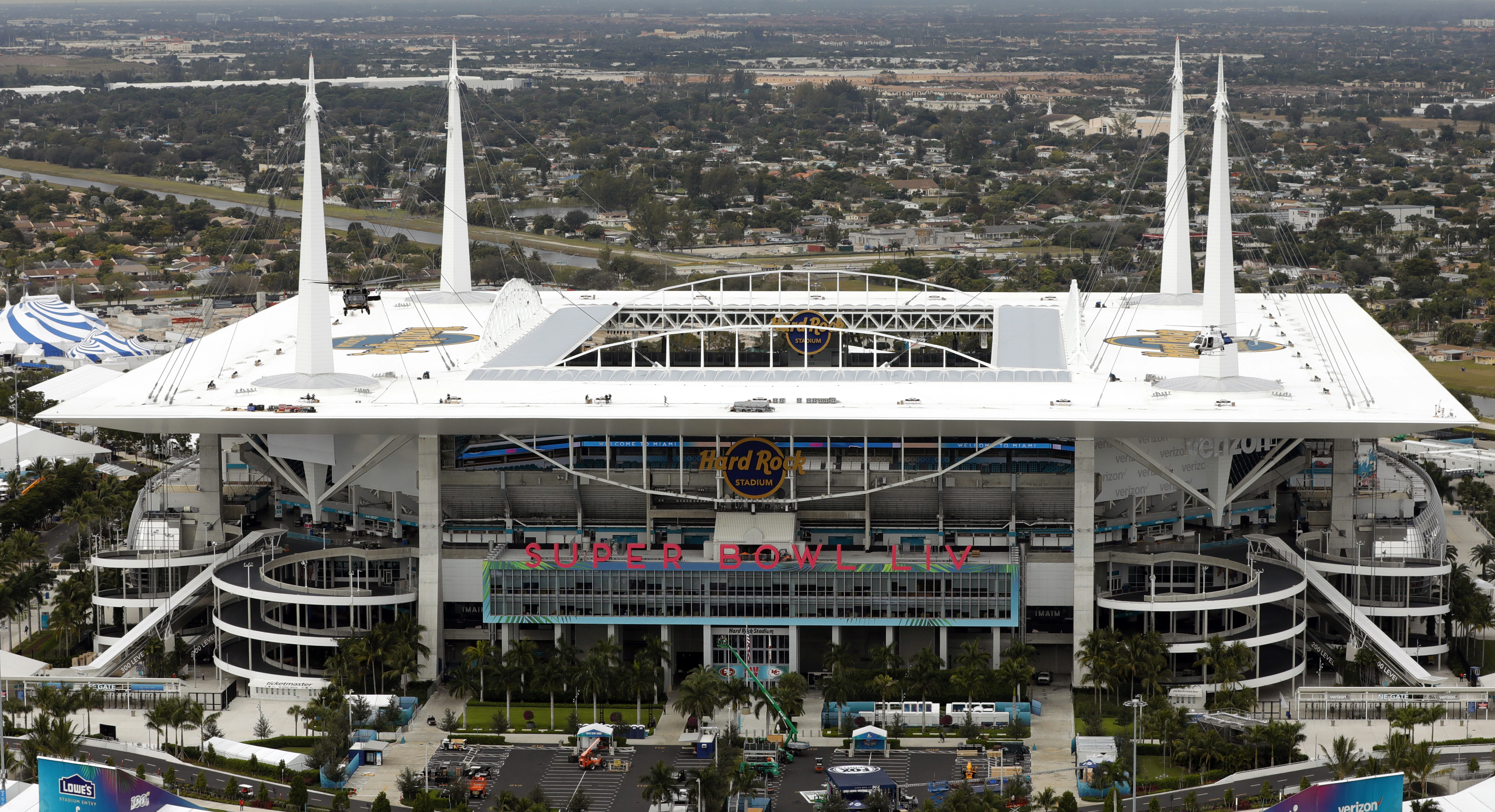
Pro Player Stadium in Miami Gardens, Florida, hosted the Orange Bowl.

The 2005 Orange Bowl was the BCS National Championship Game of the 2004 NCAA Division I-A football season and was played on January 4, 2005, at Pro Player Stadium in Miami Gardens, Florida. The game matched the USC Trojans against the Oklahoma Sooners. Both teams entered with undefeated, 12–0 records. Despite only being a 1-point favorite, USC defeated Oklahoma by a score of 55–19 to repeat as national champions and clinch their first consensus national title since 1972, led by quarterback Matt Leinart. ESPN named Leinart's performance as one of the top-10 performances in the first ten years of the BCS system.

The game featured many firsts regarding the Heisman Trophy. It was the first college game to have two Heisman winners on the same field (and on opposite teams): Leinart won the 2004 Heisman Trophy, which was awarded in the month prior to the Orange Bowl, and Oklahoma quarterback Jason White had won the award the previous season. The game also featured four of the five Heisman finalists of 2004: Leinart (winner), Oklahoma running back Adrian Peterson (first runner-up), White (second runner-up) and USC running back Reggie Bush (fourth runner-up); Bush would win the award the following season (although USC returned its copy of Bush's trophy and Bush forfeited the award following the institution of NCAA sanctions in 2010 but was returned to him in 2024).

On June 10, 2010, USC was forced to vacate all games from December 2004 to the end of the 2005 season among other sanctions as the result of an NCAA investigation into the school's football and men's basketball programs. NCAA investigators released a report stating that a USC player, Reggie Bush, was ineligible beginning in December 2004. The NCAA ordered USC to vacate every game in which Bush appeared, which included the final two games of the 2004 season (including this game), and every game of the 2005 season. The 2005 Orange Bowl is the only BCS National Championship Game ever to be vacated by the winning team. However, USC did retain the Associated Press (AP) national title.

== Scoring summary ==
Scoring Play	Score
1st quarter
Okla – Travis Wilson 5-yard pass from Jason White (Garrett Hartley kick). 7:44	OU 7–0
USC – Dominique Byrd 33-yard pass from Matt Leinart (Ryan Killeen kick). 4:27	Tie 7–7
USC – LenDale White 6-yard run (Killeen kick). 0:17	USC 14–7
2nd quarter
USC – Dwayne Jarrett 54-yard pass from Leinart (Killeen kick). 11:46	USC 21–7
USC – Steve Smith 5-yard pass from Leinart (Killeen kick). 9:17	USC 28–7
Okla – Hartley 29-yard FG 3:10	USC 28–10
USC – Smith 33-yard pass from Leinart (Killeen kick). 1:56	USC 35–10
USC – Killeen 44-yard FG 0:03	USC 38–10
3rd quarter
USC – Smith 4-yard pass from Leinart (Killeen kick). 10:42	USC 45–10
USC – Killeen 42-yard FG 4:01	USC 48–10
4th quarter
USC – White 8-yard run (Killeen kick). 9:46	USC 55–10
Okla – Safety (Leinart downed in End Zone) 6:34	USC 55–12
Okla – Wilson 9-yard pass from White (Hartley kick). 3:59	USC 55–19

== Game records ==
Team	Performance vs. Opponent	Year
Most points scored	55, USC vs. Oklahoma	2005
Individual	Performance, Team vs. Opponent	Year
Passing TDs	5, Matt Leinart, USC vs. Oklahoma	2005
Receiving TDs	3, Steve Smith, USC vs. Oklahoma	2005

== Entertainment ==
The national anthem was performed by JoJo.

The halftime show featured Kelly Clarkson, who performed "Since U Been Gone", and Ashlee Simpson, who performed "La La". Simpson's performance—coming on the heels of a lip-syncing incident that occurred during her appearance on Saturday Night Live in October 2004—was poorly-received, with Simpson receiving a shower of jeers from the crowd at its conclusion. ESPN writer D'Arcy Maine described Simpson as having "[tortured] those in the crowd with each attempt at a note, sounding more and more like a shrieking hyena as she went on", and considered it justification for "why she preferred to lip-sync".
