= Doug Nienhuis =

American football player (born 1982)

No. 67
- Position: Guard

Personal information
- Born: February 16, 1982 (age 44); Irvine, California, U.S.
- Listed height: 6 ft 6 in (1.98 m)
- Listed weight: 307 lb (139 kg)

Career information
- High school: Woodbridge (Irvine)
- College: Oregon State
- NFL draft: 2005: 7th round, 254th overall pick

Career history
- Seattle Seahawks (2005)*; New York Jets (2005); Houston Texans (2006)*; Denver Broncos (2006–2008)*; → Frankfurt Galaxy (2007)
- * Offseason or practice squad member only

Awards and highlights
- First-team All-Pac-10 (2004); Second-team All-Pac-10 (2003)
- Stats at Pro Football Reference

Douglas James Nienhuis (born February 16, 1982) is an American former professional football player who was an offensive guard in the National Football League (NFL). He played college football for the Oregon State Beavers and was selected by the Seattle Seahawks in the seventh round of the 2005 NFL draft.

Nienhuis was also a member of the New York Jets, Houston Texans, and Denver Broncos in his career.

== Early life ==
Nienhuis attended Woodbridge High School in Irvine, California, and won three varsity letters in basketball, two in football, and one in volleyball as a middle blocker. In football, he was a two-year starter and a two-time first-team All-Sea View League honoree.

== College career ==
Nienhuis attended Oregon State University and was a photography major and played college football. In football, he won first-team All-Pacific-10 Conference honors as a senior, and second-team All-Pacific-10 Conference honors as a junior.

== Professional career ==
Nienhuis was selected with the 254th overall pick in the seventh round of the 2005 NFL draft out of Oregon State University by the Seattle Seahawks. He was placed on the practice squad, then later in the season activated by the New York Jets. In the 2005 season, he appeared in seven games for the Jets. He was waived by the Jets on September 2, 2006. He was later signed to the Houston Texans' practice squad. The Texans later waived him, but he was picked up the Denver Broncos. He was later waived by the Broncos and was not signed by another NFL team.
