= Justin Wyatt =

American football player (born 1984)

No. 29
- Position: Cornerback

Personal information
- Born: January 27, 1984 (age 42); Compton, California
- Listed height: 5 ft 9 in (1.75 m)
- Listed weight: 193 lb (88 kg)

Career information
- High school: Compton (CA) Dominguez
- College: USC
- NFL draft: 2006: undrafted

Career history
- Arizona Cardinals (2006–2007)*
- * Offseason or practice squad member only

Justin Wyatt (born January 27, 1984) is an American football cornerback who was expected to be drafted in the 2006 NFL draft but went undrafted.

== Early life ==
Wyatt attended Dominguez High School in Compton, California.

== College career ==
Wyatt graduated from the University of Southern California. He was a Pac-10 honorobale mention player.

== Professional career ==
The National Football League Arizona Cardinals picked him up as a free agent.
