= Gregg Guenther =

American football player (born 1982)

Profile
- Position: Tight end

Personal information
- Born: January 29, 1982 (age 44); Calabasas, California, U.S.
- Listed height: 6 ft 8 in (2.03 m)
- Listed weight: 255 lb (116 kg)

Career information
- College: Southern California

Career history
- 2005: Tennessee Titans
- 2006–2007: Cincinnati Bengals*
- * Offseason or practice squad member only
- Stats at Pro Football Reference

Gregg Miguel Guenther Jr. (born January 29, 1982) is an American former professional football tight end who played in the National Football League (NFL) for the Cincinnati Bengals.

== College career ==
Guenther played basketball and football at the University of Southern California. He played in 24 football games, starting 8 of them, during which he totaled 24 receptions for 206 yards and three touchdowns. He opted to not play football his senior year in order to concentrate on basketball. He played power forward and center for four years with the Trojans' basketball team and averaged 5.5 points and 4.4 rebounds a game.

== Professional career ==
As a member of the Tennessee Titans, Guenther played under head coach Jeff Fisher, who attended the same high school (Taft in Woodland Hills, California) and college (USC) as Guenther. He also played under Titans' offensive coordinator Norm Chow while at USC. During the 2005 season, Guenther appeared in five games with two receptions for 13 yards.

On September 3, 2006, Guenther was waived by the Tennessee Titans. By November 1, 2006, Guenther signed with the Cincinnati Bengals practice squad under head coach Marvin Lewis. Guenther was waived from the Cincinnati Bengals in June 2007.
