= Jason Leach =

American football player (born 1982)

Profile
- Position: Safety

Personal information
- Born: July 21, 1982 (age 44); Chino, California, U.S.
- Listed height: 5 ft 11 in (1.80 m)
- Listed weight: 210 lb (95 kg)

Career information
- College: Southern California
- NFL draft: 2005: undrafted

Career history
- 2005: San Diego Chargers*
- * Offseason or practice squad member only

Awards and highlights
- 2× National champion (2003, 2004)

Jason Leach is an American former football safety.

== Early life ==
Leach prepped at Bishop Amat High School in La Puente, California.

== College career ==
Leach played college football at the University of Southern California. He started in 2003 and 2004.

== Professional career ==
Leach was a member of the San Diego Chargers of the National Football League in 2005 but did not appear in a game.
