= Norm Katnik =

American football player (born 1981)

No. 64
- Position: Center and guard

Personal information
- Born: July 2, 1981 (age 45); Tucson, Arizona, U.S.
- Listed height: 6 ft 5 in (1.96 m)
- Listed weight: 305 lb (138 kg)

Career information
- College: USC
- NFL draft: 2004: undrafted

Career history
- San Francisco 49ers (2004–2005); New York Jets (2005–2006); Minnesota Vikings (2006–2007)*; Denver Broncos (2008)*
- * Offseason or practice squad member only

Awards and highlights
- First-team All-Pac-10 (2003)
- Stats at Pro Football Reference

Norm Katnik (born July 2, 1981) is an American former professional football player who was a center in the National Football League (NFL). He was originally signed by the San Francisco 49ers as an undrafted free agent in 2004. He played college football for the USC Trojans.

Katnik was also a member of the New York Jets, Minnesota Vikings and Denver Broncos.

== Early life ==
Katnik prepped at Foothill High in Santa Ana, California. He started on both the offensive and defensive lines.

== College career ==
Katnik played college football at the University of Southern California. He was 1 of 6 finalists for the 2003 Dave Rimington Trophy, third-team All-America and first-team All-Pac-10 Conference.

== Professional career ==
He was originally signed by the San Francisco 49ers but saw no action in a regular season game. He also spent time with the New York Jets, and started two games during the 2006 season. He was signed to the Vikings practice squad near the end of the 2006 NFL season and was on the practice squad for the remainder of that year.
