= Jason Mitchell (wide receiver) =

American gridiron football player (born 1981)

Profile
- Position: Wide receiver

Personal information
- Born: July 19, 1981 (age 45); Torrance, California, U.S.
- Listed height: 6 ft 4 in (1.93 m)
- Listed weight: 215 lb (98 kg)

Career information
- College: Southern California
- NFL draft: 2004: undrafted

Career history
- 2005: Jacksonville Jaguars
- 2007–2008: Saskatchewan Roughriders

Jason Mitchell (born July 19, 1981) is a former wide receiver for the Saskatchewan Roughriders.

== Early life ==
Mitchell prepped at North Torrance High School.

== College career ==
Mitchell played college football at the University of Southern California.

== Professional career ==
Previously, he was with the Jacksonville Jaguars organization.

Signed a contract with the Saskatchewan Roughriders of the CFL in 2007 and was released from the team on July 6, 2007. He has subsequently rejoined the Roughriders, as a member of their Developmental Squad, on July 12, 2007. He was moved to the active roster on July 27, 2007, and saw his CFL debut on July 28, 2007, against the Edmonton Eskimos. He caught one pass for seven yards in his debut with the Riders. He was subsequently released by the Riders on July 31, 2007. On January 23, 2008, he was signed to a one-year plus an option year contract with the Riders.
