= Keary Colbert =

American football player and coach (born 1982)

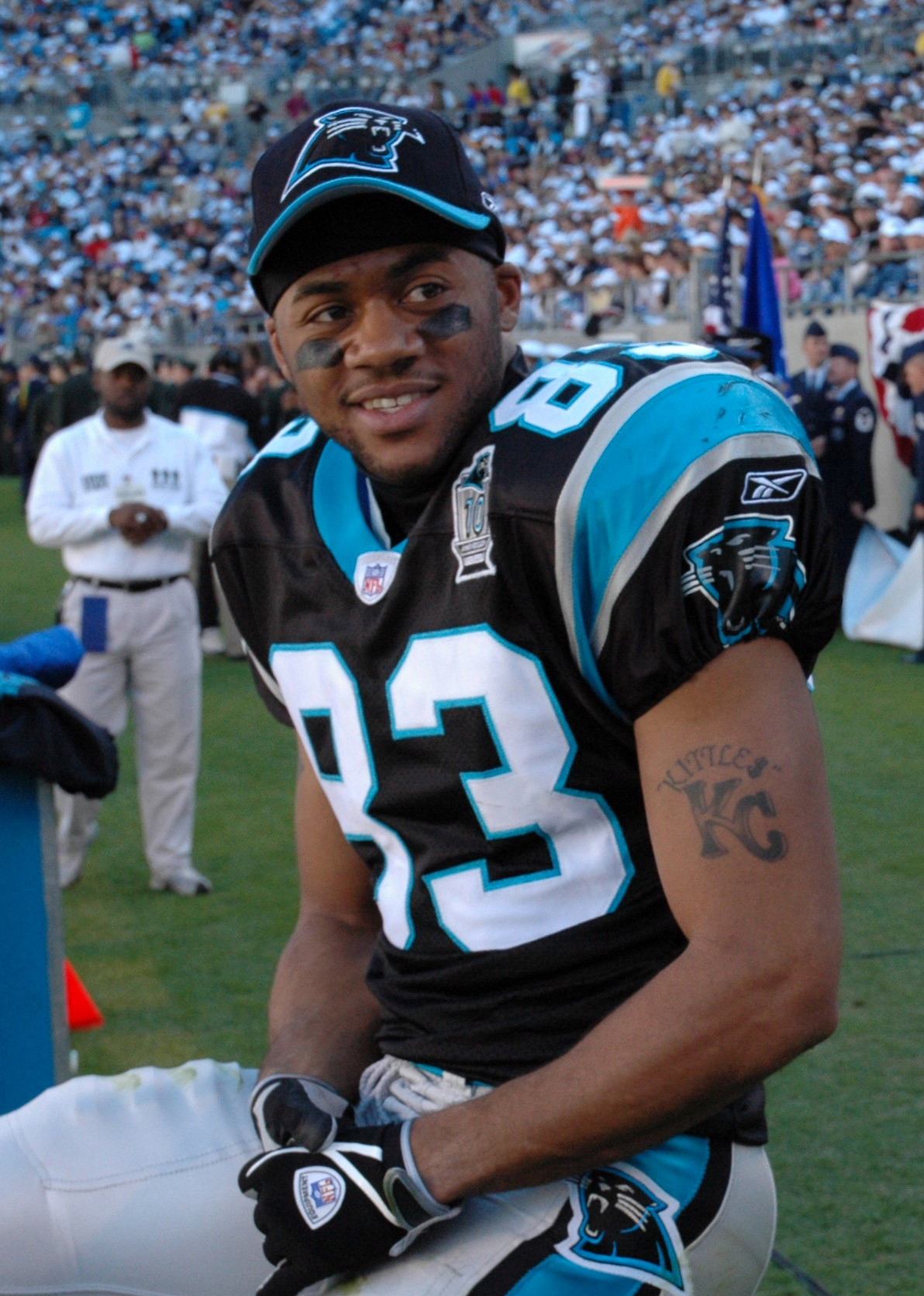
- Colbert with the Carolina Panthers in 2004

Baltimore Ravens
- Title: Wide receivers coach

Personal information
- Born: May 21, 1982 (age 44); Oxnard, California, U.S.
- Listed height: 6 ft 1 in (1.85 m)
- Listed weight: 205 lb (93 kg)

Career information
- Position: Wide receiver (No. 83, 85, 13, 19, 84)
- High school: Hueneme (Oxnard)
- College: USC
- NFL draft: 2004: 2nd round, 62nd overall pick

Career history

Playing
- Carolina Panthers (2004–2007); Denver Broncos (2008); Seattle Seahawks (2008); Detroit Lions (2008–2009); Florida Tuskers (2009); Sacramento Mountain Lions (2011)*; Kansas City Chiefs (2011)
- * Offseason or practice squad member only

Coaching
- USC (2010–2011) Graduate assistant; Pace Academy (2012) Volunteer coach; Georgia State (2013) Wide receivers coach; Alabama (2014–2015) Offensive analyst; USC (2016–2017) Offensive quality control assistant; USC (2018) Tight ends coach & inside receivers coach; USC (2019–2021) Wide receivers coach; Florida (2022) Wide receivers coach; Denver Broncos (2023–2025) Wide receivers coach; Baltimore Ravens (2026–present) Wide receivers coach

Awards and highlights
- National championship (2015); 2003 AP National Championship (USC); 2× Second-team All-Pac-10 (2002, 2003)

Career NFL statistics
- Receptions: 130
- Receiving yards: 1,629
- Receiving touchdowns: 8
- Stats at Pro Football Reference

Patrick Keary Jerel Colbert (born May 21, 1982) is an American professional football coach and former player who was most recently the wide receivers coach for the Denver Broncos of the National Football League (NFL). Colbert played in the NFL as a wide receiver.

Colbert played college football for the USC Trojans. He was selected by the Carolina Panthers in the second round of the 2004 NFL draft. He also played for the Denver Broncos, Seattle Seahawks, Detroit Lions, Florida Tuskers, Sacramento Mountain Lions, and Kansas City Chiefs.

== Early life ==
Colbert attended Hueneme High School in Oxnard, California, and was a letterman in football and track. He also lettered in basketball as a sophomore. Colbert also attended Sunkist Elementary and E.O. Green Junior High School. He played football as a youth for the Port Hueneme Rhinos.

== College career ==
He attended University of Southern California, where he was a star wide receiver. In his final year at USC (2003), Colbert made an unbelievable catch while he was interfered by a defender in the Rose Bowl against University of Michigan, broke away and walked into the end zone for a touchdown. Colbert's 149 yards in the Rose Bowl were a career-high. The effort helped USC capture the AP National Championship. Colbert caught at least one pass in his final 36 games, and left USC as the school's all-time leader in pass receptions, passing Kareem Kelly with 207. He earned All-Pac-10 second-team honors his senior year and finished second on the team with 69 receptions for 1,013 yards and nine touchdowns.

== Professional career ==
Pre-draft measurables
Height	Weight	Arm length	Hand span	Vertical jump
6 ft 0 7/8 in (1.85 m)	207 lb (94 kg)	29 3/4 in (0.76 m)	9 1/4 in (0.23 m)	30.0 in (0.76 m)
All values from NFL Combine

=== Carolina Panthers ===
Colbert was the Carolina Panthers' second round pick in the 2004 NFL draft. With the Panthers, he stepped into the 2nd receiver spot when Steve Smith was injured. He filled in nicely, with 47 catches for 754 yards and 5 touchdowns. On Oct 10, Colbert recorded 4 receptions for 115 yards and a touchdown against the Denver Broncos, setting a franchise rookie record with 28.7 yards/reception.

With high expectations for Colbert in the 2005 season, he struggled catching 25 passes for 282 yards and 2 touchdowns. In 2006, Colbert was often inactive late in the season, and following a mediocre 2007 campaign, was placed on injured reserve.

=== Denver Broncos ===
On March 1, 2008, he signed with the Denver Broncos to a three-year, $7.2 million contract, including a $2.5 million signing bonus.

=== Seattle Seahawks ===
On September 16, 2008, Colbert was acquired from the Denver Broncos by the Seattle Seahawks for a conditional fifth-round pick in the 2009 NFL draft. Colbert was released by the Seahawks on November 11.

=== Detroit Lions ===
Colbert was signed by the Detroit Lions on December 1, 2008, after wide receiver Mike Furrey was placed on injured reserve. On May 7, 2009, he was re-signed by Detroit. On September 5, Colbert was cut from the team.

=== Sacramento Mountain Lions ===
On June 12, 2011, Colbert signed with the Sacramento Mountain Lions of the United Football League.

=== Kansas City Chiefs ===
On August 10, 2011, Colbert signed with the Kansas City Chiefs of the National Football League. He was waived by the Chiefs on November 23.

== Coaching career ==
=== USC ===
In 2010, Colbert was hired as the assistant tight ends coach at USC, a position he held for only one season.

=== Georgia State ===
In 2013, Colbert was the assistant wide receivers coach at Georgia State.

=== Alabama ===
Colbert served as the offensive analyst at Alabama during their 2014 and 2015 seasons. He helped the Crimson Tide win two SEC titles and a national championship in 2015 season

=== USC (second stint) ===
In 2016, Colbert returned to the USC coaching staff as an offensive analyst. In 2018, Colbert became the program's tight ends coach. In 2019, Colbert was named as the team's receivers coach.

=== Florida ===
On December 15, 2021, Colbert was named as wide receivers coach at Florida, joining the staff of first year head coach Billy Napier.

=== Denver Broncos ===
On February 23, 2023, the Denver Broncos hired Colbert to serve as the team's wide receivers coach under head coach Sean Payton.

=== Baltimore Ravens ===
On February 11, 2026, the Baltimore Ravens hired Colbert to serve as the team's wide receivers coach under newly-hired head coach Jesse Minter.
