= Lee Webb =

American football player (born 1981)

Profile
- Position: Fullback

Personal information
- Born: November 3, 1981 (age 45); Inglewood, California, U.S.
- Listed height: 5 ft 11 in (1.80 m)
- Listed weight: 240 lb (109 kg)

Career information
- High school: Crenshaw (Los Angeles, California)
- College: USC
- NFL draft: 2005: undrafted

Career history
- Jacksonville Jaguars (2005–2006)*
- * Offseason or practice squad member only

Lee Webb (born November 3, 1981) is a former National Football League fullback for the Jacksonville Jaguars.

== Early life ==
He went to Crenshaw High School.

== College career ==
Webb played college football at the University of Southern California.

== Coaching career ==
Currently in his fifth year coaching Palos Verdes Peninsula High School as the running back coach.
