= Dallas Sartz =

American football player and coach (born 1983)

No. 55
- Position: Linebacker

Personal information
- Born: July 8, 1983 (age 43); Granite Bay, California, U.S.
- Listed height: 6 ft 5 in (1.96 m)
- Listed weight: 236 lb (107 kg)

Career information
- High school: Granite Bay (CA)
- College: USC
- NFL draft: 2007: 5th round, 143rd overall pick

Career history
- Washington Redskins (2007)*; Minnesota Vikings (2008)*; Seattle Seahawks (2008)*
- * Offseason or practice squad member only

Dallas Sartz (born July 8, 1983) is an American former football linebacker. He was selected by the Washington Redskins in the fifth round of the 2007 NFL draft. He played college football at Southern California.

Sartz was also a member of the Minnesota Vikings and Seattle Seahawks.

== Early life ==
Sartz prepped at Granite Bay High School in Granite Bay, California. He was originally a powerful safety, but was later moved to linebacker in college. A highly touted recruit, he mulled attending Oregon and Washington before committing to Pete Carroll's Trojans.

== College career ==
Sartz played college football at the University of Southern California, where he was a two-time team captain. He was a 2004 and 2006 Pac-10 conference honorable mention. Sartz was invited to play in the 2007 East-West Shrine Game.

== Professional career ==
=== Washington Redskins ===
Sartz was selected by the Washington Redskins in fifth round in the 2007 NFL draft with the 143rd overall pick. He ran a 4.58 40 at the NFL Combine. Sartz signed a contract with the Redskins in July 2007. On September 1, 2007, Sartz was released by the Redskins.

=== Minnesota Vikings ===
On March 17, 2008, Sartz signed with the Minnesota Vikings. He was later released on May 2.

=== Seattle Seahawks ===
In August 2008, Sartz was signed by the Seattle Seahawks, but released later that month.

== Coaching ==
Sartz began working as a coach for the UC Davis Aggies football team, who compete at the FCS level of college football, during the 2010 season. Sartz as of 2014 also is coaching for his old high school team the Granite Bay Grizzlies.

== Personal ==
Sartz graduated from USC with a bachelor's degree in communications and a business law minor. Sartz' mother, Lori, was a track sprinter. Sartz' father, Jeff, played as a safety during his years at Oregon State University, and also attended Shadle Park High School in Spokane, Washington. He was coached by Gary Davis while at Shadle Park. His sister, Stephanie, attended Berkeley and worked as a Cal football recruiter and his grandfather was a boxer at Washington State University and a professional hydroplane racer.
