= Lenny Vandermade =

American football player and coach (born 1981)

Current position
- Title: Offensive analyst
- Team: USC
- Conference: Pac-12

Biographical details
- Born: January 3, 1981 (age 45)

Playing career
- 2000–2003: USC
- 2004: Baltimore Ravens*
- 2004–2006: Pittsburgh Steelers*
- 2005: Hamburg Sea Devils
- Positions: Guard, Center

Coaching career (HC unless noted)
- 2007: San Diego State (GA)
- 2008: San Diego (TE)
- 2009–2012: USC (TE)
- 2014–2015: USC (TE)
- 2016–2017: Santa Margarita Catholic HS (OL)
- 2018–2022: USC (Offensive analyst)
- 2023-2024: St. Ignatius Prep
- 2025-Present: Santa Margarita Catholic HS (OC/OL)

Lenny Vandermade (born January 3, 1981) is an American football coach and former player. He currently serves as the Offensive Coordinator and offensive line coach at Santa Margarita Catholic High School.

== Early life ==
Vandermade prepped at Mater Dei High School. He was a 1998 Super Prep All-American, USA Today All-USA honorable mention, Prep Star Dream Team Top 100, Super Prep All-Farwest, Prep Star All-Western, Long Beach Press-Telegram Best in the West honorable mention, Orange County Register Fab 15 second-team, Tacoma News Tribune Western 100, Cal-Hi Sports All-State first-team, All-CIF Southern Section first-team, All-CIF Division I first-team, Los Angeles Times All-Orange County, Orange County Register All-Orange County first-team and All-South Coast League first-team as a senior at Mater Dei. He did not allow a sack in 1998 as a left offensive tackle. On defense, he had 26 tackles with 2 sacks. Mater Dei went 13–1, won the CIF Division I championship and was ranked No. 2 nationally by USA Today.

As a 1997 junior, he made the Cal-Hi Sports All-State Underclass first-team, All-CIF Southern Section second-team, All-CIF Division I first-team, Los Angeles Times All-Orange County first-team, Orange County Register All-Orange County second-team and All-South Coast League first-team.

He made the Cal-Hi Sports All-State Sophomore first-team and All-South Coast League second-team as a 1996 sophomore as Mater Dei went 14–0, won the CIF Division I title and was named national champion by USA Today. He earned at least a 90% blocking grade in all of his games as a junior and senior. He also posted 78 career tackles (7 were sacks). A 3-year starter, Mater Dei went 40-2 during that time.

== College career ==
Vandermade played college football at the University of Southern California.

2003: Vandermade started at left offensive guard as a senior in 2003, his fourth season as a line starter. He won USC's Co-Lifter of the Year award.

2002: Vandermade started for his third season on the offensive line, this time at left guard as a junior in 2002. He tore his right biceps tendon at Stanford, which required surgery and sidelined him the rest of the 2002 season.

2001: Vandermade started for his second season at center as a sophomore in 2001. He started 8 games and appeared in 11 contests. He was on the "Watch List" for the 2001 Dave Rimington Trophy, given to the nation's top center.

2000: As a redshirt freshman in 2000, Vandermade started all season, the first 5 games at left offensive guard (for an injured Trevor Roberts) and then the final 7 contests at center (for an injured Eric Denmon). He was named to the 2000 Freshman All-American first-teams by The Sporting News and Football News.

== Professional career ==
Vandermade played for the Pittsburgh Steelers of the National Football League and NFL Europe's affiliate Hamburg Sea Devils. He was originally signed by the Baltimore Ravens.

== Coaching career ==
In addition to USC, Vandermade has coached on the college level at San Diego State and the University of San Diego. He began his coaching career as a graduate assistant at San Diego State in 2007. He became the head coach at St. Ignatius College Preparatory before the 2023 season. After going 7-5 in 2023, Vandermade led the Wildcats to a 10-3 record in 2024 which included a share of the West Catholic League title and a CIF-Central Coast Section Open Division championship earned with a 10-7 victory over St. Francis and was named the San Francisco Chronicle's Coach of the Year. Following the season, Vandermade resigned as head coach and relocated to Southern California where he was reunited with his college roommate Carson Palmer at Santa Margarita Catholic High School in Rancho Santa Margarita. Serving as offensive coordinator and assistant head coach, Vandermade helped lead the Eagles to a CIF Southern Section Open Division and State championship.
