= Tom Malone (American football) =

American football player (born 1984)

No. 14
- Position: Punter

Personal information
- Born: March 29, 1984 (age 42); Lake Elsinore, California, U.S.
- Listed height: 6 ft 0 in (1.83 m)
- Listed weight: 205 lb (93 kg)

Career information
- College: Southern California
- NFL draft: 2006: undrafted

Career history
- San Francisco 49ers (2006)*; New England Patriots (2006–2009)*; → Berlin Thunder (2007); New York Sentinels (2009); Seattle Seahawks (2010)*; Sacramento Mountain Lions (2010–2011); St. Louis Rams (2012)*
- * Offseason or practice squad member only

Awards and highlights
- Second-team All-American (2003); 2× First-team All-Pac-10 (2003, 2004)

Thomas Malone (born March 29, 1984) is an American former professional football punter. He was signed by the San Francisco 49ers as an undrafted free agent in 2006. He played college football at Southern California. He is the cousin of NFL Punter Robert Malone.

Malone was also a member of the New England Patriots, New York Sentinels, Seattle Seahawks, Sacramento Mountain Lions, and St. Louis Rams.

== Early life ==
Malone went to Temescal Canyon High School. After beginning his football career at wide receiver he became a punter after discovering that he could kick the ball far better. After looking at USC, Stanford and Washington, he chose USC. He graduated a semester early and enrolled at USC in the spring of 2002.

== College career ==
Malone entered the 2002 season as USC's first true freshman starting punter in ten years, playing all 13 games and averaging 42.1 yards on his 62 punts. He made the All-Freshman Team in several publications. In the 2003 season, the sophomore again appeared in all 13 games, averaging 49.0 yards (breaking the previous USC record) on his 42 punts. Malone earned first-team All-American honors from ESPN.com, SI.com and Collegefootballnews.com, becoming USC's first-ever All-American punter. Malone was a lead contender for the national punting title, but because of USC's very efficient offense that year he was five punts shy of having the NCAA-required minimum 3.6 punts per game to be listed—his 49.0 average was 1.0 yards above the national leader.

Going into his junior season, Malone had become a fan favorite due to the novelty of having an All-American punter at a school that dominated offensively. A USC fan began a humorous and well-meaning "Malone4Heisman" campaign that received attention from both his teammates (including that year's actual Heisman Trophy winner Matt Leinart) and major sports media outlets. It was this campaign that dubbed Malone "the Bomb".

During the 2004 season, Malone again appeared in all 13 games, he averaging 43.8 yards on 49 punts. He ranked ninth nationally in punting (43.8, first in Pac-10) and was a semifinalist for the 2004 Ray Guy Award. His performance at the 2005 FedEx Orange Bowl earned him a place on CBS Sportsline.com's All-Bowl Team.

In the summer before his senior season, Malone injured his right hip during workouts which limited his ability to practice during the season. During his final season, the USC offense performed better than it had in his previous seasons: averaged 50 points a game and only allowing Malone 30 punts in 12 games, lower than any previous season. USC did not punt during his final home game, a 66-19 offensive explosion against rival-UCLA. Despite the step backwards, Malone took things well saying, "From a team standpoint, this could not have gone better. It's the most fun you could ever imagine. From a personal standpoint, it's been a little frustrating." He graduated from USC in 2006 with a degree in political science.

== Professional career ==
=== San Francisco 49ers ===
Malone was signed by the San Francisco 49ers as an undrafted free agent on May 5, 2006, but was waived by the team on July 9, 2006.

=== New England Patriots ===
The New England Patriots signed Malone to their practice squad on December 20, 2006. When former USC teammate Mario Danelo died in January 2007, Patriots head coach Bill Belichick gave him a week off and paid to send him to the funeral. He was re-signed to a future contract on January 23, 2007, but was waived on August 22, 2007. He was then signed to the Patriots' practice squad on September 10, 2008, waived from it on September 15, 2008, and re-signed to the team's practice squad on November 26, 2008. He was waived on May 5, 2009, but re-signed on June 1, 2009. He was waived again on August 1, 2009.

=== Seattle Seahawks ===
Malone was signed by the Seattle Seahawks on February 13, 2010. He was waived on April 28, 2010.
