= Alex Holmes =

American football player (born 1981)

Profile
- Position: Tight end

Personal information
- Born: August 22, 1981 (age 45); San Diego, California, U.S.
- Listed height: 6 ft 3 in (1.91 m)
- Listed weight: 260 lb (118 kg)

Career information
- High school: Harvard-Westlake School (Los Angeles, California)
- College: USC

Career history
- 2005: Miami Dolphins
- 2006: St. Louis Rams*
- * Offseason or practice squad member only
- Stats at Pro Football Reference

Alex Holmes (born August 22, 1981) is an American former professional football tight end who played in the National Football League (NFL).

== Early life ==
He played high school football for Harvard-Westlake School near Sherman Oaks, CA. In 1998, he led the team at tight end and middle linebacker to a 10–4 record, and a berth in the Division VII CIF Southern Section championship game. His coach called him the best player he had ever coached in his thirty-year career.

== College career ==
Holmes played college football for the University of Southern California. He was a starter at tight end, and a part of two national championship teams.

== Professional career ==
Holmes played for the Miami Dolphins in 2005 and signed as a free agent with the St. Louis Rams for 2006.

== Personal life ==
Holmes' father, Mike, played at the University of Michigan in the mid-1970s. Holmes' younger sister is married to Pittsburgh Steelers safety Troy Polamalu. His younger brother Khaled was an offensive lineman at USC, and currently plays for the Indianapolis Colts. Known for repeatedly torching unsuspecting defenders, he continues playing in some of Southern California's premier basketball leagues.
