= Ryan Killeen =

American football player (born 1983)

Profile
- Position: Placekicker

Personal information
- Born: July 11, 1983 (age 43); Norco, California, U.S.
- Listed height: 5 ft 11 in (1.80 m)
- Listed weight: 185 lb (84 kg)

Career information
- College: USC
- NFL draft: 2005: undrafted

Career history
- Detroit Lions (2005)*; Seattle Seahawks (2006)*; → Amsterdam Admirals (2006)
- * Offseason or practice squad member only

Awards and highlights
- 2× National champion (2003–2004)

Ryan Killeen (born July 11, 1983) is an American former football placekicker. He played college football for the USC Trojans. He was a member of the Detroit Lions, Seattle Seahawks, and Amsterdam Admirals.

== College career ==
Killeen played college football at the University of Southern California. He transferred there from Mt. San Antonio College in his sophomore season.

== Professional career ==
He was originally signed as a free agent for the Detroit Lions, but was cut before the regular season.
