= Dominique Byrd =

American football player (born 1984)

No. 82, 86
- Position: Tight end

Personal information
- Born: February 7, 1984 (age 42); Minneapolis, Minnesota, U.S.
- Listed height: 6 ft 3 in (1.91 m)
- Listed weight: 255 lb (116 kg)

Career information
- High school: Breck (Golden Valley, Minnesota)
- College: Southern California
- NFL draft: 2006: 3rd round, 93rd overall pick

Career history
- St. Louis Rams (2006–2007); Arizona Cardinals (2009); Seattle Seahawks (2011); Washington Redskins (2011); Sacramento Mountain Lions (2012)

Career NFL statistics
- Receptions: 6
- Receiving yards: 83
- Receiving touchdowns: 1
- Stats at Pro Football Reference

Dominique Montiel Byrd (born February 7, 1984) is an American former professional football player who was a tight end in the National Football League (NFL). He was selected by the St. Louis Rams in the third round of the 2006 NFL draft. He played college football for the USC Trojans.

He was also a member of the Arizona Cardinals, Seattle Seahawks, Washington Redskins, and Sacramento Mountain Lions.

== Early life ==
Following his high school career at Breck School in Golden Valley, Minnesota, Byrd played in the 2002 U.S. Army All-American Bowl.

== College career ==
Byrd went to Southern California where he made a 2004 All-Pac-10 honorable mention, and was best known for catching two one-handed touchdown passes, one of which was in the Orange Bowl victory against University of Oklahoma.

== Professional career ==
Pre-draft measurables
Height	Weight	Arm length	Hand span	40-yard dash	20-yard shuttle	Vertical jump	Broad jump	Bench press
6 ft 2 5/8 in (1.90 m)	255 lb (116 kg)	31 1/2 in (0.80 m)	9 1/2 in (0.24 m)	4.79 s	4.44 s	36 in (0.91 m)	9 ft 8 in (2.95 m)	16 reps
All values from NFL Combine/USC's Pro Day

=== St. Louis Rams ===
Byrd was taken in the third round of the 2006 NFL draft with the 93rd overall pick. He played 5 games in the 2006 season, catching 2 balls for 39 yards and one touchdown.

=== Arizona Cardinals ===
After spending the 2008 season out of football, Byrd was signed by the Arizona Cardinals on May 5, 2009. He was waived on November 24, 2009. On January 21, 2010, Byrd was re-signed to a future contract by the Cardinals. But his stay with the Cardinals ended on August 30, 2010, when he was released by the team.

=== Seattle Seahawks ===
On January 21, 2011, the Seahawks signed Byrd to a future contract. He was released on September 13.

=== Washington Redskins ===
On October 26, 2011, the Redskins signed Byrd to a 1-year deal as a backup to replace Chris Cooley, who was placed on injured reserve. He was waived on November 8. He re-signed for the Redskins, after Fred Davis was suspended on December 6. Byrd was released on December 20, 2011.

=== Sacramento Mountain Lions ===
Byrd played for the Sacramento Mountain Lions in 2012.
