= Sultan McCullough =

American football player (born 1980)

No. 22
- Position: Running back

Personal information
- Born: February 12, 1980 (age 46); Pasadena, California, U.S.
- Listed height: 6 ft 0 in (1.83 m)
- Listed weight: 197 lb (89 kg)

Career information
- High school: John Muir (Pasadena)
- College: USC
- NFL draft: 2003: undrafted

Career history
- Washington Redskins (2003); Carolina Panthers (2004)*; Tampa Bay Buccaneers (2004)*; Cleveland Browns (2004–2005)*
- * Offseason or practice squad member only

Awards and highlights
- Second-team All-Pac-10 (2000)

Career NFL statistics
- Rushing attempts: 1
- Rushing yards: 9
- Receptions: 3
- Receiving yards: 13
- Stats at Pro Football Reference

Sultan Rashad McCullough (born February 12, 1980) is an American former professional football player who was a running back in the National Football League (NFL) for the Washington Redskins and in the Canadian Football League (CFL) for the Montreal Alouettes. He played college football for the USC Trojans.

During his college career, McCullough was a standout in both football and track, winning the 1999 Pac-10 championship in the 100 meter dash. He is widely regarded as the fastest player in USC Trojans history. His brother Saladin McCullough also played professional football.

== Early life ==
McCullough attended John Muir High School in Pasadena, California where he was one of the top sprinters in the state. Along with Obea Moore, he led his team to a CIF State title in the 4×100 relay and was favored to win the state title in the sprint events. However, he suffered an injury while competing in the 100-meter final forcing him to pull out of the race. Despite this setback, his team still holds the meet record at the prestigious Arcadia Invitational.

== College career ==
McCullough played college football at the University of Southern California.

== Professional career ==
McCullough has played for the Washington Redskins appearing in one game, where he carried the ball once for 9 yards and caught three passes for 13 yards. He also spent time on the practice squad for the Cleveland Browns.
