= Bernard Riley =

American football player (born 1981)

No. 93
- Position: Nose tackle

Personal information
- Born: January 12, 1981 (age 45); San Jose, California, U.S.
- Listed height: 6 ft 2 in (1.88 m)
- Listed weight: 315 lb (143 kg)

Career information
- High school: Los Alamitos (Los Alamitos, California)
- College: Southern California
- NFL draft: 2003: undrafted

Career history
- Tampa Bay Buccaneers (2003)*; Los Angeles Avengers (2005); Columbus Destroyers (2007)
- * Offseason or practice squad member only
- Stats at ArenaFan.com

Bernard Riley (born January 12, 1981) was an American former football defensive lineman. He is currently the Defensive Line coach at Bastrop High School, in Austin, Texas.

== Early life ==
Riley prepped and was a high school All-American at Los Alamitos High School, playing under Coach John Barnes and alongside Keenan Howry and Chris Kluwe. Riley started as a defensive lineman.

He played alongside former Philadelphia Eagles defensive tackle and 2005 first round pick Mike Patterson, who was also his future teammate at USC.

== College career ==
Bernard Riley played college football at the University of Southern California.

== Professional career ==
Bernard signed with the Tampa Bay Buccaneers of the NFL as an undrafted free agent out of college.

Riley played in the Arena Football League for the Los Angeles Avengers, the Columbus Destroyers and is currently retired from football. He began coaching just after he retired, he started coaching Defensive Line at Lakewood High School in Lakewood, California. Then he moved to Texas where he was the head coach at Austin High School in Austin. Also coached Defensive Line for Round Rock High School, in Round Rock, TX. And he is currently the Defensive Line Coach at Bastrop High School in Austin.
