= Justin Fargas =

American football player (born 1980)

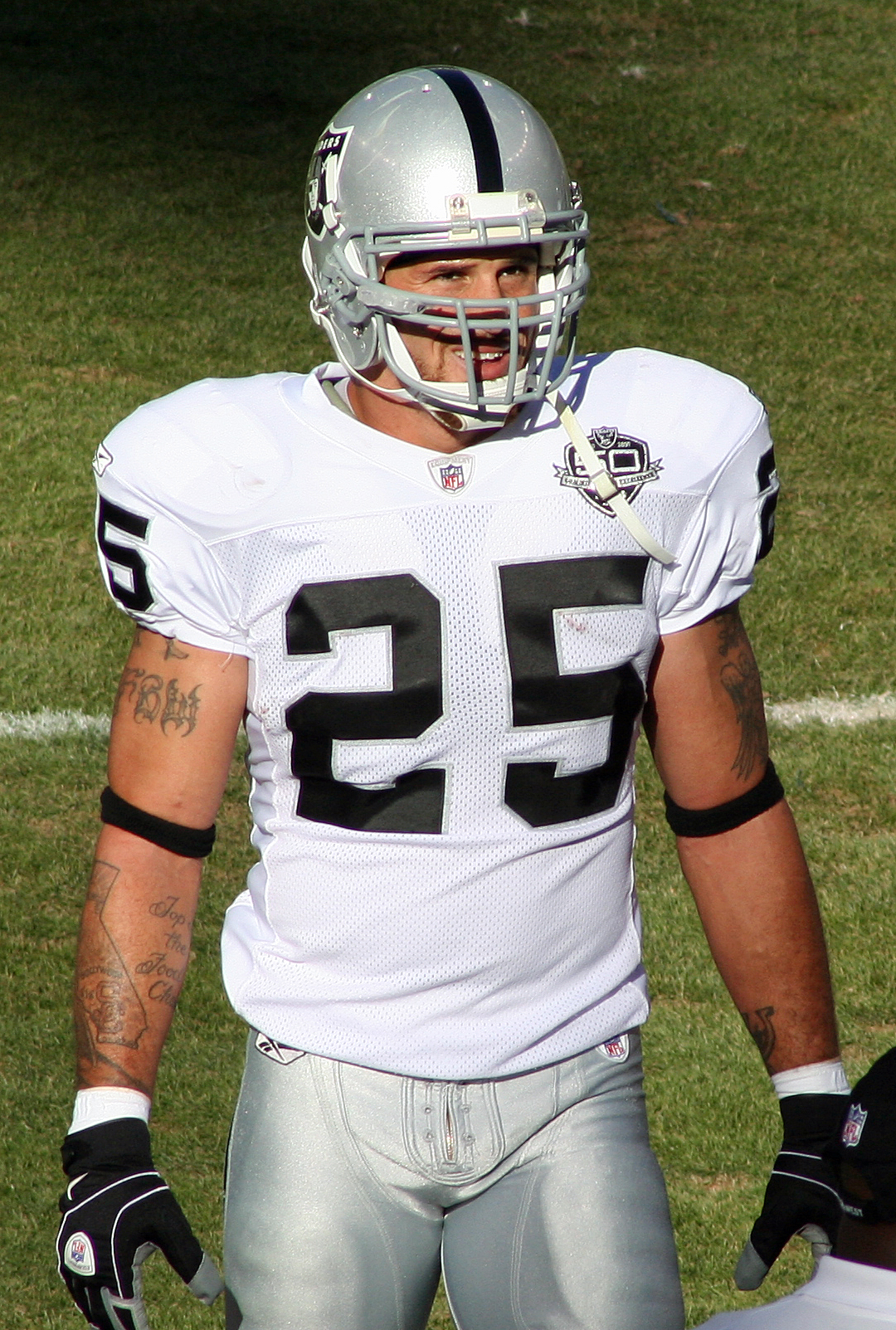
- Fargas with the Oakland Raiders in 2009

No. 20, 25
- Position: Running back

Personal information
- Born: January 25, 1980 (age 46); Encino, California, U.S.
- Listed height: 6 ft 1 in (1.85 m)
- Listed weight: 220 lb (100 kg)

Career information
- High school: Notre Dame (Sherman Oaks, California)
- College: Michigan (1998–2000); USC (2002)
- NFL draft: 2003: 3rd round, 96th overall pick

Career history
- Oakland Raiders (2003–2009); Denver Broncos (2010)*
- * Offseason or practice squad member only

Awards and highlights
- Second-team All-Pac-10 (2002)

Career NFL statistics
- Rushing yards: 3,369
- Rushing average: 4.1
- Receptions: 77
- Receiving yards: 523
- Total touchdowns: 10
- Stats at Pro Football Reference

Justin Alejandro Fargas (born January 25, 1980) is an American former professional football player who was a running back in the National Football League (NFL). He played college football for the Michigan Wolverines and USC Trojans and was selected by the Oakland Raiders in the third round of the 2003 NFL draft.

== College career ==
Fargas attended the University of Michigan, as a highly regarded football prospect, for three years (1998–2000). He was named one of the Top 10 Freshmen in the country by Sports Illustrated. During his freshman year, he ran for 277 yards with 1 TD on 77 carries (3.6 avg.) in 10 games. He started there as a running back before switching to safety in the middle of the 2000 season. Yet his college career at Michigan was cut short during his freshman season when he broke his leg. He was redshirted in 1999 while he rehabilitated his broken right leg.

After considering both California and USC, Fargas chose to transfer to USC in 2001. Due to NCAA transfer rules he sat out the 2001 season. In 2002, his final season in college, Fargas rushed for 715 yards on 161 carries (4.4 yards per rush) with the Trojans.

=== Track and field ===
Fargas was also a track star at the University of Michigan. He recorded personal best of 10.37 seconds in the 100 meters while in high school at Notre Dame High School in Sherman Oaks, California while qualifying for the 1998 CIF California State Meet and 50.13 seconds in the 400 meters in 2007 during the off season while playing for the Oakland Raiders. Fargas won the state championship in 1997.

Personal bests

Event	Time (seconds)	Venue	Date
100 meters	10.37 +2.0	Norwalk, California	May 23, 1998
400 meters	50.13	Fullerton, California	March 10, 2007

== Professional career ==
Pre-draft measurables
Height	Weight	Arm length	Hand span	40-yard dash	10-yard split	20-yard split	Broad jump	Bench press
6 ft 0 7/8 in (1.85 m)	219 lb (99 kg)	31 in (0.79 m)	9 3/4 in (0.25 m)	4.35 s	1.47 s	2.54 s	11 ft 5 in (3.48 m)	27 reps
All values from NFL Combine

=== Oakland Raiders ===
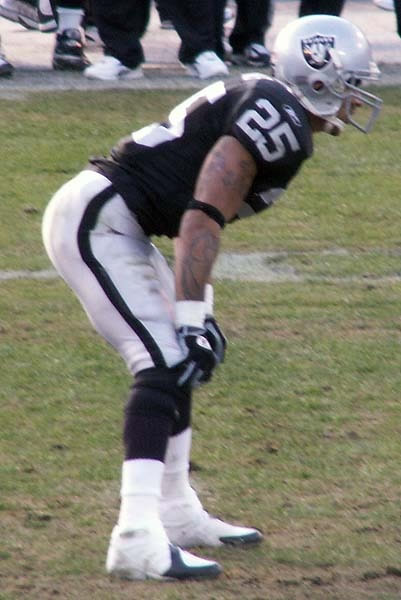
Fargas with the Raiders

Fargas was drafted in the 3rd round (96th overall pick) of the 2003 NFL Draft by the Oakland Raiders. He signed a 5-year rookie contract worth $2.615 million on July 24, 2003. His deal included a $700,000 signing bonus. Fargas played for seven seasons for the Oakland Raiders. Fargas did not have many rushing attempts in his first several years. In 2006 he started six games and rushed 178 times for 659 yards and one touchdown. In 2007 he took over after LaMont Jordan became injured and had a 1,000-yard season, rushing for 1,009 yards on 222 carries and four touchdowns. In February of 2008, Fargas and the Raiders agreed to a 3 year contract extension worth $12 million. He was the starting running back for the Raiders for most of the 2008 season and had 218 carries for 853 yards and one touchdown. He split time in 2009 with Darren McFadden and Michael Bush, and he was second on the team in rushing with 129 carries for 491 yards and three touchdowns. On March 6, 2010, he was released by the Raiders after reportedly failing his physical. Fargas disputed the claim.

=== Denver Broncos ===
Fargas signed with the Denver Broncos on August 11, 2010. They needed a running back after Knowshon Moreno, Correll Buckhalter, and LenDale White were all injured in training camp. It was his first action with a team since undergoing arthroscopic knee surgery in March. He was released by the Broncos on August 30, 2010.

=== NFL statistics ===
Rushing stats

Year	Team	Games	Carries	Yards	Yards per carry	Longest carry	Touchdowns	First downs	Fumbles	Fumbles lost
2003	OAK	10	40	203	5.1	53	0	10	1	1
2004	OAK	12	35	126	3.6	15	1	9	1	1
2005	OAK	14	5	28	5.6	15	0	2	0	0
2006	OAK	16	178	659	3.7	48	1	27	1	1
2007	OAK	14	222	1,009	4.5	48	4	52	3	1
2008	OAK	14	218	853	3.9	42	1	32	3	1
2009	OAK	12	129	491	3.8	35	3	23	1	0
Career		92	827	3369	4.1	53	10	155	10	6

== Personal life ==
Fargas is the son of Starsky and Hutch actor Antonio Fargas and designer Taylor Hastie.

He was indirectly referenced in an early episode of The Simpsons, when a show titled "Old Starsky and Hutches" wins an Ace Award at a ceremony hosted by Homer as a Krusty the Klown impersonator. The award is accepted by "the son of the guy who played Huggy Bear".

Fargas is married to basketball coach and executive Nikki Caldwell. Their first child was born in March 2012.
