= Malaefou MacKenzie =

Samoan gridiron football player (born 1979)

No. 40
- Position: Fullback

Personal information
- Born: July 24, 1979 (age 47); Apia, Western Samoa
- Listed height: 5 ft 10 in (1.78 m)
- Listed weight: 225 lb (102 kg)

Career information
- High school: Capistrano Valley (Mission Viejo, California, U.S.)
- College: USC
- NFL draft: 2003: 7th round, 218th overall pick

Career history
- Jacksonville Jaguars (2003); New England Patriots (2004)*
- * Offseason or practice squad member only
- Stats at Pro Football Reference

Matthew Mark Maleafou Anesi MacKenzie (born July 24, 1979) is a Samoan former professional American football fullback who played for the Jacksonville Jaguars of the National Football League (NFL) in 2003. He played college football at USC and was selected by the Jaguars in the seventh round of the 2003 NFL draft.

== Early life ==
MacKenzie played high school football at Capistrano Valley High School in Mission Viejo, California.

== College career ==
MacKenzie continued his career at the University of Southern California. Due to injury and personal hardships (death of a parent), the NCAA granted him a second redshirt year, allowing him to remain on the squad for a total of six years.

== Professional career ==
=== Jacksonville Jaguars ===
MacKenzie was selected by the Jacksonville Jaguars in the seventh round, with the 218th overall pick, of the 2003 NFL draft. He played in one game for the Jaguars during the 2003 season before being waived on September 16, 2003.

=== New England Patriots ===
MacKenzie signed a reserve/future contract with the New England Patriots on January 8, 2004. He was waived on September 5, 2004, and signed to the Patriots' practice squad on September 7. He was released by the Patriots on September 10, 2004.
