= Manuel Wright =

American football player (born 1984)

No. 75
- Position: Defensive tackle

Personal information
- Born: April 13, 1984 (age 42); Compton, California, U.S.
- Listed height: 6 ft 5 in (1.96 m)
- Listed weight: 345 lb (156 kg)

Career information
- High school: Long Beach Polytechnic (Long Beach, California)
- College: USC
- Supplemental draft: 2005: 5th round

Career history
- Miami Dolphins (2005–2006); Buffalo Bills (2007)*; New York Giants (2007); Stockton Lightning (2009); Utah Blaze (2010)
- * Offseason or practice squad member only

Awards and highlights
- Super Bowl champion (XLII)

Career NFL statistics
- Total tackles: 6
- Sacks: 1
- Stats at Pro Football Reference

Manuel Wright (born April 13, 1984) is an American former professional football player who was a defensive tackle in the National Football League (NFL). He played college football for the USC Trojans and was selected by the Miami Dolphins in the fifth round of the 2005 supplemental draft. Wright was also briefly signed to the Buffalo Bills and played for the New York Giants where he earned a Super Bowl ring in Super Bowl XLII.

== Early life ==
Wright earned various team, local and national honors as a member of the football team at Long Beach Polytechnic High School in Long Beach, California. As a junior in 2000, Wright recorded 95 tackles (57 solo) and with 25 sacks. As a senior, Wright was the team's defensive MVP after recording 142 tackles (60 solo), 16 sacks, four fumble recoveries, three forced fumbles, 20 deflections and an interception.

== College career ==
Wright originally signed with USC in 2002 but did not qualify for admission, so he attended Long Beach City College that season as a part-time student. He did not play football there.

In 2003, Wright served as a backup for Defensive tackles Shaun Cody and Mike Patterson. While appearing in nine games during the season, Wright recorded eight tackles, including two for losses and three pass deflections. His first career sack came against Michigan in the Rose Bowl.

Wright remained a backup to both Cody and Patterson as a sophomore in 2004. He appeared in 11 games including two starts when Cody was moved to Defensive end. On the year Wright had 23 tackles, including six for losses, two pass deflections and two fumble recoveries. For his efforts, he was an All-Pac-10 honorable mention.

=== Early departure ===
In 2005 Wright was a projected starter for the first time in his career. He sat out spring practices in order to work on his academics and remain eligible. He was unsuccessful and was left with the options of either staying in school and not playing football or declaring for the NFL's supplemental draft, which is held by the league to accommodate players who did not enter the regular draft. Wright chose the latter.

== Professional career ==
=== Miami Dolphins ===
Leading up to the supplemental draft, many NFL teams showed interest in Wright in the form of visits, workouts and interviews. The Miami Dolphins selected Wright in the fifth round of the draft, which essentially replaced their fifth-round pick in the 2006 draft. On July 22, Wright signed a four-year contract with the team. It included a signing bonus of $190,000.

Wright endured injuries and battled weight issues during his first training camp while his work ethic and maturity were questioned by some. In a much publicized incident on July 26, Wright broke down in tears during practice after being scolded by head coach Nick Saban.

As a rookie, Wright was active for three games during the season. He made his NFL debut on December 4 against the Buffalo Bills, stepping in for injured Nose tackle Keith Traylor. Wright recorded two tackles and a sack. He finished the season with four tackles, one sack and one pass deflected.

Wright reportedly gained 28 pounds during the 2006 offseason, but lost most of the weight during training camp. On August 8, a reportedly depressed Wright took a leave of absence from the team. He was quoted as saying he "did not believe he would ever play for the Dolphins again and that he needed a 'fresh start'".

Despite requests from his family and from Head coach Nick Saban, Wright remained away from football in 2006. The Dolphins attempted to trade him, unsuccessfully, but were unable to reach an agreement to release him. The team received a roster exemption for Wright in 2006 and he was placed on the non-football injury list.

Although Wright had returned to the team during the 2007 offseason under new head coach Cam Cameron, he was released on May 1.

=== Buffalo Bills ===
On May 3, the Buffalo Bills claimed Wright on waivers. Less than a week later, he was waived by the Bills. He told Chris Brown of the team's official website that he had 30 pounds to lose. Wright was subsequently cut by the Bills on May 10 after showing up at the team's first minicamp overweight.

=== New York Giants ===
Wright signed with the New York Giants on August 15, 2007. He appeared in six games during the regular season and recorded two tackles. He was also a member of the Giants' Super Bowl XLII championship team.

On April 10, 2008, the Giants waived Wright.

=== af2 ===
In 2008 Wright joined the af2 and on December 22 was assigned to the Stockton Lightning. On May 8, he was suspended by the team.

== See also ==
- List of University of Southern California people
- List of New York Giants players
- List of Miami Dolphins players
- List of National Football League and Arena football players
