= Winston Justice =

American football player (born 1984)

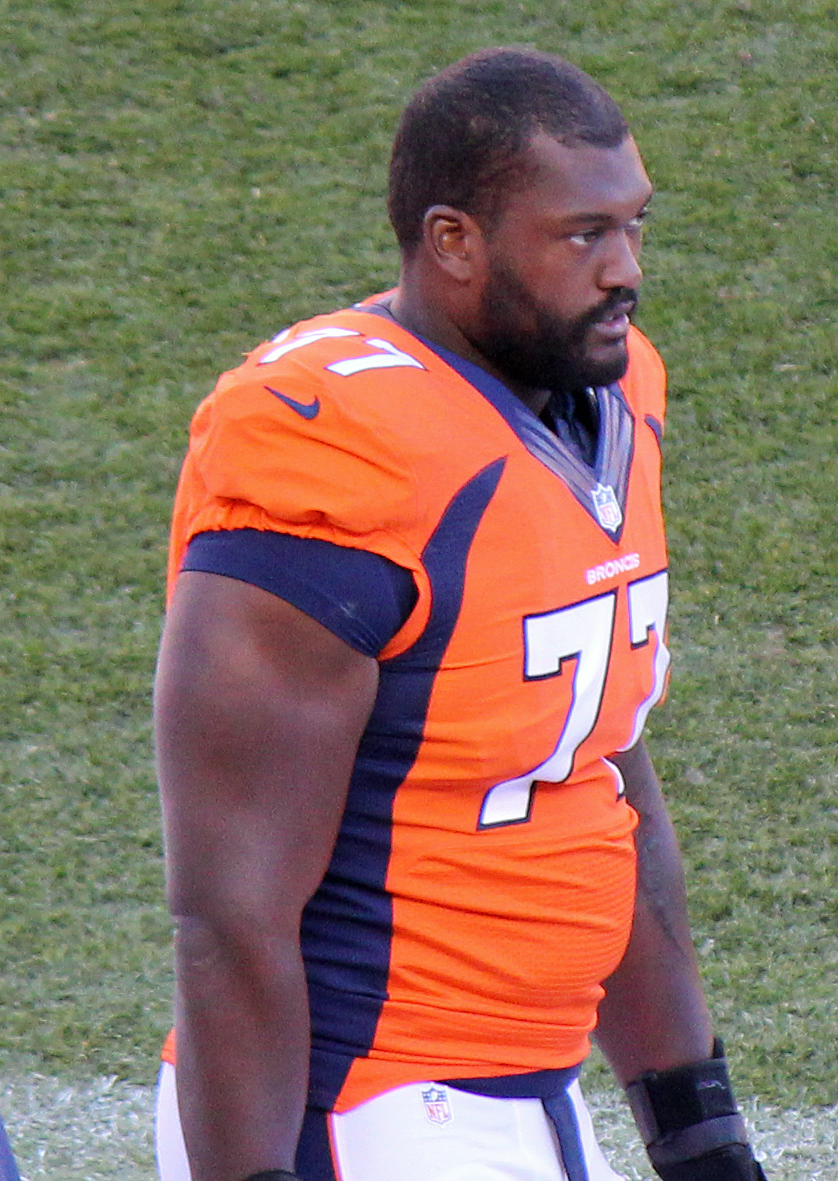
- Justice with the Denver Broncos in 2013

No. 74, 69, 77
- Position: Offensive tackle

Personal information
- Born: September 14, 1984 (age 42); Long Beach, California, U.S.
- Listed height: 6 ft 6 in (1.98 m)
- Listed weight: 317 lb (144 kg)

Career information
- High school: Long Beach Polytechnic
- College: USC (2002–2005)
- NFL draft: 2006: 2nd round, 39th overall pick

Career history
- Philadelphia Eagles (2006–2011); Indianapolis Colts (2012); Denver Broncos (2013)
- Stats at Pro Football Reference

Winston Frederick Justice (born September 14, 1984) is an American former professional football player who was an offensive tackle in the National Football League (NFL). He played college football for the USC Trojans and was selected by the Philadelphia Eagles in the second round of the 2006 NFL draft. He also played for the Indianapolis Colts and Denver Broncos.

== Early life ==
Justice attended Long Beach Polytechnic High School in Long Beach, California.

== College career ==
Justice played college football at the University of Southern California. He was regarded as one of the best tackles to come out of USC. Justice blocked for three Heisman Trophy winners (quarterbacks Carson Palmer and Matt Leinart, and running back Reggie Bush).

== Professional career ==
Winston Justice is Chief Executive Officer of SagePoint Capital Partners, where he leads the firm’s multi-family office and wealth platform at the intersection of capital stewardship, entrepreneurial leadership, and institutional strategy. Prior to SagePoint, Winston served as Chief Executive Officer of SageSpring Private Wealth, overseeing an $8.2 billion registered investment advisory firm comprising 52 advisor teams and more than 190 professionals nationwide. Under his leadership, the firm generated more than $800 million in net new assets in 2025 and expanded through strategic acquisitions into high-growth markets. He also founded the SageSpring Family Office and the Foundations and Institutions business line, serving endowments, nonprofits, and mission-driven organizations. Earlier in his career, Winston served as an Investment Manager at AllianceBernstein, advising institutions, foundations, and global family offices on asset allocation, governance, and portfolio construction. He also built the hedge fund alternatives platform at Pacific Income Advisers and was an equity portfolio analyst at Wells Fargo Securities. An entrepreneur, Winston is Co-Founder of Elixr Coffee Roasters, a multi-location company generating more than $10 million in annual revenue, and Co-Founder of Mashburn and Justice Capital, a private investment vehicle focused on healthcare and education ventures. Winston began his professional career in the National Football League after being selected 39th overall in the 2006 NFL Draft. He served nine seasons as an offensive tackle and was Team Captain for both the Philadelphia Eagles and the Indianapolis Colts. In 2010, he was recognized as the Walter Payton Philadelphia Man of the Year. He holds a Master of Business Administration from The George Washington University School of Business and earned the Certified Investment Management Analyst designation through the Yale School of Management. He also holds degrees from the University of Southern California and Thomas Edison State University and completed executive studies at the Wharton School of the University of Pennsylvania. Winston serves on numerous civic and nonprofit boards and is an Adjunct Professor at the Lipscomb School of Business. He leads SagePoint with discipline, conviction, and a long-term commitment to building enduring legacies.

Pre-draft measurables
| Height | Weight | Arm length | Hand span | 40-yard dash | 20-yard shuttle | Three-cone drill | Vertical jump | Broad jump | Bench press |
|---|---|---|---|---|---|---|---|---|---|
| 6 ft 6 1/8 in (1.98 m) | 319 lb (145 kg) | 34 1/2 in (0.88 m) | 9 7/8 in (0.25 m) | 5.16 s | 4.43 s | 7.31 s | 39.0 in (0.99 m) | 9 ft 2 in (2.79 m) | 38 reps |
All values from NFL Combine/Pro Day

=== Philadelphia Eagles ===
Justice was selected in the second round with the 39th overall pick by the Philadelphia Eagles in the 2006 NFL draft. However, the Eagles did consider using their first round draft pick on him. Many considered him a first round pick because of his athleticism and other abilities.

His first NFL start came against the New York Giants on September 30, 2007. In the Eagles' 16–3 loss, Justice allowed six sacks. Justice was outmatched by defensive end Osi Umenyiora of the Giants in his first appearance in the NFL. Justice made his second career start against the Carolina Panthers on September 13, 2009, and played well against star defensive end Julius Peppers.

After starting right tackle Shawn Andrews was placed on injured reserve due to a back injury on September 15, 2009, Justice became the full-time starter at the position. Justice started all sixteen games in 2009.

On November 24, 2009, Justice was given a four-year contract extension, which put him under contract until the end of the 2013 season.

In 2010, he was the recipient of the Walter Payton Philadelphia Man of the Year award. Justice was also a player elected team representative and helped advocate for his teammates.

Justice was placed on the active/physically unable to perform list on July 28, 2011, due to a knee injury. He was activated on September 3.

=== Indianapolis Colts ===
Justice was traded to the Indianapolis Colts on March 14, 2012, along with the Eagles' sixth round pick in 2012 for the Colts' sixth round pick in 2012.

=== Denver Broncos ===
On September 18, 2013, the Denver Broncos signed Justice after starting left offensive tackle Ryan Clady suffered a season-ending foot sprain. In 2014, the Broncos re-signed Justice. He was released on August 25, 2014.

== Personal life ==
Justice is a Christian. Justice has spoken about his faith, saying, "I work to glorify God. ... I think my goal is to be a great offensive tackle. But, my major goal is to glorify God. I want people to see Christ in me when I play. Not being fearful, to giving his all on every play."
