= Paul Arnold =

Paul Arnold may refer to:

- Paul Arnold (American football) (born 1980), American football player
- Paul Arnold (Michigan politician) (1893–1973), former member of the Michigan House of Representatives
- Paul Arnold (baseball) (1903–1979), American Negro leagues baseball player
- Paul Arnold (rugby union) (born 1968), Welsh rugby player
- Paul Arnold (composer) (born 1972), English video game and film music composer
- Paul Arnold (judge) (r. 1975–1983), French judge, the initiator and the first President of European Buddhist Union
