= 2002 Arizona Wildcats football team =

American college football season

2002 Arizona Wildcats football
- Conference: Pacific-10
- Record: 4–8 (1–7 Pac-10)
- Head coach: John Mackovic (2nd season)
- Offensive coordinator: Rick Dykes (2nd season)
- Offensive scheme: Spread
- Defensive coordinator: Larry Mac Duff (12th season)
- Base defense: Double Eagle Flex
- Home stadium: Arizona Stadium

2002 Pacific-10 Conference football standings
	Conf.			Overall
Team	W		L	W		L
No. 10 Washington State $+	7	–	1	10	–	3
No. 4 USC %+	7	–	1	11	–	2
Arizona State	5	–	3	8	–	6
Oregon State	4	–	4	8	–	5
UCLA	4	–	4	8	–	5
California	4	–	4	7	–	5
Washington	4	–	4	7	–	6
Oregon	3	–	5	7	–	6
Arizona	1	–	7	4	–	8
Stanford	1	–	7	2	–	9
$ – BCS representative as conference champion; % – BCS at-large representative; + – Conference co-champions; Rankings from AP Poll

The 2002 Arizona Wildcats football team represented the University of Arizona during the 2002 NCAA Division I-A football season. They were coached by John Mackovic in his second season with the Wildcats. Arizona ended the season with a record of 4–8 (1–7 against Pac-10 opponents) and finished tied for last place in the Pac-10 standings.

After starting the season 3–1, the Wildcats would continue to struggle in conference play, winning only a single game at California. Late in the season, Mackovic would become embroiled in controversy as a result of mistreatment of players. The team would not recover and ended the year with another losing record.

== Schedule ==
Date	Time	Opponent	Site	TV	Result	Attendance	Source
August 31	7:00 p.m.	No. 21 (I-AA) Northern Arizona*	Arizona Stadium; Tucson, AZ	FSNAZ	W 37–3	48,446	
September 14	7:00 p.m.	Utah*	Arizona Stadium; Tucson, AZ	FSNAZ	W 23–17	44,243	
September 21	9:00 a.m.	at No. 22 Wisconsin*	Camp Randall Stadium; Madison, WI	ESPN2	L 10–31	78,582	
September 28	7:00 p.m.	North Texas*	Arizona Stadium; Tucson, AZ	KWBA	W 14–9	37,917	
October 5	7:00 p.m.	No. 8 Oregon	Arizona Stadium; Tucson, AZ	FSN	L 14–31	47,356	
October 12	12:30 p.m.	at No. 22 Washington	Husky Stadium; Seattle, WA	FSN	L 28–32	71,016	
October 19	2:00 p.m.	at Stanford	Stanford Stadium; Palo Alto, CA	FSN	L 6–16	33,800	
October 26	7:00 p.m.	No. 9 Washington State	Arizona Stadium; Tucson, AZ	FSN	L 13–21	46,462	
November 2	2:00 p.m.	at Oregon State	Reser Stadium; Corvallis, OR	FSN	L 3–38	36,644	
November 9	7:30 p.m.	UCLA^{†}	Arizona Stadium; Tucson, AZ	FSNAZ	L 7–37	43,613	
November 16	1:30 p.m.	at California	California Memorial Stadium; Berkeley, CA	FSN	W 52–41	28,808	
November 29	1:00 p.m.	Arizona State	Arizona Stadium; Tucson, AZ (Territorial Cup)	FSN	L 20–34	47,005	
*Non-conference game; ^{†}Homecoming; Rankings from AP Poll released prior to the game; All times are in Mountain time

== Before the season ==
Arizona completed the 2001 season in Mackovic’s first year with the program with a 5–6 record and a victory over rival Arizona State. The team would rebuild during the offseason and hoped to improve on their record for 2002. With receiver Bobby Wade and linebacker Lance Briggs returning for their final season for one last crack at a bowl game appearance, the Wildcats looked to contend for a winning season and fulfill Mackovic’s promise of reaching the Rose Bowl.

== Game summaries ==
=== vs Northern Arizona ===
Northern Arizona Lumberjacks (0–0) vs Arizona Wildcats (0–0) – Game summary

Quarter	1	2	3	4	Total
Lumberjacks	0	3	0	0	3
Wildcats	10	17	7	3	37

at Arizona Stadium • Tucson, AZ

- Date: August 31, 2002
- Game time: 7:00 P.M.
- Game weather: Cloudy, 94 °F (34 °C)
- Game attendance: 48,446
- Referee: David Cutaia
- TV: Fox Sports Arizona

Game information

First quarter

- (9:25) ARIZ – Sean Keel 48-yard field goal (Drive: 8 plays, 25 yards, 2:45; Arizona 3–0)
- (2:48) ARIZ – Clarence Farmer 2-yard run, Sean Keel kick (Drive: 5 plays, 40 yards, 2:14; Arizona 10–0)

Second quarter

- (10:04) ARIZ – Sean Keel 24-yard field goal (Drive: 10 plays, 73 yards, 3:19; Arizona 13–0)
- (6:45) NAU – Paul Ernster 22-yard field goal (Drive: 7 plays, 75 yards, 3:12; Arizona 13–3)
- (5:27) ARIZ – Bobby Wade 52-yard pass from Jason Johnson, Sean Keel kick (Drive: 4 plays, 80 yards, 1:12; Arizona 20–3)
- (1:18) ARIZ – James Hugo 20-yard pass from Jason Johnson, Sean Keel kick (Drive: 10 plays, 86 yards, 2:56; Arizona 27–3)

Third quarter

- (5:59) ARIZ – Bobby Wade 24-yard pass from Jason Johnson, Bobby Gill kick (Drive: 9 plays, 66 yards, 4:00; Arizona 34–3)

Fourth quarter

- (8:35) ARIZ – Bobby Gill 26-yard field goal (Drive: 4 plays, -1 yard, 1:40; Arizona 37–3)

Statistics	NAU	ARIZ
First downs	9	25
Total yards	202	510
Rushing yards	28–115	41–103
Passing yards	87	407
Passing: Comp–Att–Int	11–25–1	23–41–0
Time of possession	25:53	34:07

Team	Category	Player	Statistics
Northern Arizona	Passing	Clint Womack	11/25, 87 yards, INT
Northern Arizona	Rushing	Brian Bingham	7 carries, 73 yards
Northern Arizona	Receiving	Raufeem Jackson	1 reception, 32 yards
Arizona	Passing	Jason Johnson	20/36, 381 yards, 3 TD
Arizona	Rushing	Mike Bell	13 carries, 59 yards
Arizona	Receiving	Bobby Wade	8 receptions, 133 yards, 2 TD

The Wildcats began the season by hosting in-state foe Northern Arizona from Flagstaff. It was the first meeting between the two since 1945. The Wildcats would dominate the Lumberjacks from the start for an easy win.

=== vs Utah ===
Utah Utes (1–0) vs Arizona Wildcats (1–0) – Game summary

Quarter	1	2	3	4	Total
Utes	0	7	7	3	17
Wildcats	7	6	10	0	23

at Arizona Stadium • Tucson, AZ

- Date: September 15, 2002
- Game time: 7:00 P.M.
- Game weather: Clear, 92 °F (33 °C)
- Game attendance: 44,243
- Referee: Jim Fogltance
- TV: Fox Sports Arizona

Game information

First quarter

- (6:23) ARIZ – Bobby Wade 47-yard pass from Jason Johnson, Sean Keel kick (Drive: 6 plays, 70 yards, 2:40; Arizona 7–0)

Second quarter

- (11:01) ARIZ – Sean Keel 21-yard field goal (Drive: 10 plays, 76 yards, 3:59; Arizona 10–0)
- (7:46) UTAH – Josh Lyman 5-yard pass from Lance Rice, Bryan Borreson kick (Drive: 3 plays, 8 yards, 1:27; Arizona 10–7)
- (0:09) ARIZ – Sean Keel 19-yard field goal (Drive: 7 plays, 50 yards, 1:16; Arizona 13–7)

Third quarter

- (12:45) ARIZ – Andrae Thurman 44-yard pass from Jason Johnson, Sean Keel kick (Drive: 6 plays, 80 yards, 2:10; Arizona 20–7)
- (10:16) ARIZ – Sean Keel 39-yard field goal (Drive: 4 plays, -3 yards, 1:14; Arizona 23–7)
- (5:56) UTAH – Paris Jackson 7-yard pass from Lance Rice, Bryan Borreson kick (Drive: 3 plays, 39 yards, 1:02; Arizona 23–14)

Fourth quarter

- (4:51) UTAH – Bryan Borreson 53-yard field goal (Drive: 5 plays, 20 yards, 1:34; Arizona 23–17)

Statistics	UTAH	ARIZ
First downs	11	23
Total yards	204	459
Rushing yards	22–32	44–43
Passing yards	172	416
Passing: Comp–Att–Int	18–38–0	24–35–1
Time of possession	23:28	36:32

Team	Category	Player	Statistics
Utah	Passing	Lance Rice	18/38, 172 yards, 2 TD
Utah	Rushing	J.R. Peroulis	9 carries, 18 yards
Utah	Receiving	Devin Houston	4 receptions, 62 yards
Arizona	Passing	Jason Johnson	24/35, 416 yards, 2 TD, INT
Arizona	Rushing	Clarence Farmer	33 carries, 79 yards
Arizona	Receiving	Bobby Wade	40 receptions, 175 yards, TD

In their next game against Utah, Arizona started off hot with a Wade touchdown catch. The Wildcats would add to their lead with a pair of field goals before halftime. In the second half, Arizona increased their lead after a Briggs forced fumble which turned into another field goal.

By the fourth quarter, the Utes would rally to cut the Arizona lead to a single score. In the final minute, they threatened to possibly win it by entering Wildcat territory. They would be denied a touchdown when a Utah receiver stepped out of bounds after a catch, though replays showed that he may have had a foot in bounds, which became controversial among Utah fans. A few plays later, the Wildcats would stop the Utes short of the goal line on fourth down, and Arizona survived move to 2–0 for the second consecutive season under Mackovic. Arizona’s defense shut down Utah’s rushing offense (which was ranked second at the time), limiting them to only 36 yards.

=== at No. 22 Wisconsin ===
Arizona Wildcats (2–0) at No. 22 Wisconsin Badgers (4–0) – Game summary

Quarter	1	2	3	4	Total
Wildcats	0	0	7	3	10
No. 22 Badgers	0	24	7	0	31

at Camp Randall Stadium • Madison, WI

- Date: September 21, 2002
- Game time: 9:00 A.M.
- Game weather: Sunny and Clear, 63 °F (17 °C)
- Game attendance: 78,582
- Referee: Dave Witvoet
- TV: ESPN2

Game information

First quarter

- No scoring plays

Second quarter

- (14:53) WIS – Anthony Davis 6-yard run, Scott Campbell kick (Drive: 7 plays, 74 yards, 2:49; Wisconsin 7–0)
- (13:45) WIS – Anthony Davis 3-yard run, Scott Campbell kick (Drive: 1 play, 3 yards, 0:49; Wisconsin 14–0)
- (4:03) WIS – Jonathan Orr 17-yard pass from Brooks Bollinger, Scott Campbell kick (Drive: 10 plays, 96 yards, 4:50; Wisconsin 21–0)
- (0:12) WIS – Scott Campbell 32-yard field goal (Drive: 8 plays, 21 yards, 2:39; Wisconsin 24–0)

Third quarter

- (10:15) ARIZ – Clarence Farmer 70-yard run, Sean Keel kick (Drive: 7 plays, 94 yards, 2:16; Wisconsin 24–7)
- (1:39) WIS – Brooks Bollinger 1-yard run, Scott Campbell kick (Drive: 15 plays, 80 yards, 8:31; Wisconsin 31–7)

Fourth quarter

- (8:12) ARIZ – Sean Keel 27-yard field goal (Drive: 8 plays, 11 yards, 2:29; Wisconsin 31–10)

Statistics	ARIZ	WIS
First downs	13	21
Total yards	292	425
Rushing yards	30–154	47–260
Passing yards	138	165
Passing: Comp–Att–Int	14–32–2	15–22–0
Time of possession	26:06	33:54

Team	Category	Player	Statistics
Arizona	Passing	Jason Johnson	13/27, 129 yards, INT
Arizona	Rushing	Clarence Farmer	20 carries, 136 yards, TD
Arizona	Receiving	Bobby Wade	7 receptions, 85 yards
Wisconsin	Passing	Brooks Bollinger	13/19, 127 yards, TD
Wisconsin	Rushing	Anthony Davis	16 carries, 110 yards, 2 TD
Wisconsin	Receiving	Jonathan Orr	7 receptions, 90 yards, TD

Arizona traveled to Wisconsin to play the #22 Badgers in the first ever meeting between the two teams. After a scoreless first quarter, Wisconsin broke it open with 24 points, drawing comparisons to Arizona’s embarrassing loss to Penn State in 1999. The Wildcats would play better in the second half, but the big halftime deficit would be too much for them to overcome and lost for the first time in the season. Arizona’s dominant offense fell silent against the Badgers and Mackovic lost his first non-conference game as Wildcat coach.

=== vs North Texas ===
North Texas Mean Green (1–3) vs Arizona Wildcats (2–1) – Game summary

Quarter	1	2	3	4	Total
Mean Green	3	3	3	0	9
Wildcats	0	14	0	0	14

at Arizona Stadium • Tucson, AZ

- Date: September 28, 2002
- Game time: 7:00 P.M.
- Game weather: Cloudy, 85 °F (29 °C)
- Game attendance: 37,917
- Referee: Gordon Riese
- TV: KWBA

Game information

First quarter

- (5:14) UNT – Nick Bazaldua 44-yard field goal (Drive: 12 plays, 66 yards, 4:56; North Texas 3–0)

Second quarter

- (8:13) UNT – Nick Bazaldua 32-yard field goal (Drive: 11 plays, 50 yards, 4:05; North Texas 6–0)
- (2:34) ARIZ – Mike Bell 14-yard run, Drew Dunning kick (Drive: 1 play, 14 yards, 0:05; Arizona 7–6)
- (0:00) ARIZ – Gary Love 60-yard blocked field goal return, Sean Keel kick (Arizona 14–6)

Third quarter

- (10:52) UNT – Nick Bazaldua 31-yard field goal (Drive: 9 plays, 66 yards, 4:03; Arizona 14–9)

Fourth quarter

- No scoring plays

Statistics	UNT	ARIZ
First downs	21	20
Total yards	431	310
Rushing yards	60–282	35–121
Passing yards	431	310
Passing: Comp–Att–Int	12–18–1	16–27–0
Time of possession	31:21	28:39

Team	Category	Player	Statistics
North Texas	Passing	Andrew Smith	12/18, 149 yards, INT
North Texas	Rushing	Kevin Galbreath	22 carries, 104 yards
North Texas	Receiving	George Marshall	6 receptions, 82 yards
Arizona	Passing	Jason Johnson	16/27, 189 yards
Arizona	Rushing	Clarence Farmer	15 carries, 70 yards
Arizona	Receiving	Bobby Wade	4 receptions, 37 yards

=== vs No. 8 Oregon ===
No. 8 Oregon Ducks (4–0) vs Arizona Wildcats (3–1) – Game summary

Quarter	1	2	3	4	Total
No. 8 Ducks	7	10	7	7	31
Wildcats	14	0	0	0	14

at Arizona Stadium • Tucson, AZ

- Date: October 5, 2002
- Game time: 7:00 P.M.
- Game weather: Clear, 80 °F (27 °C)
- Game attendance: 47,356
- Referee: Jay Stricherz
- TV: Fox Sports Arizona

Game information

First quarter

- (11:57) ARIZ – Mike Bell 19-yard pass from Jason Johnson, Bobby Gill kick (Drive: 4 plays, 45 yards, 1:27; Arizona 7–0)
- (8:03) ORE – Onterrio Smith 3-yard run, Jared Siegel kick (Drive: 9 plays, 80 yards, 3:48; Tied 7–7)
- (1:53) ARIZ – Bobby Wade 16-yard pass from Jason Johnson, Bobby Gill kick (Drive: 5 plays, 38 yards, 1:50; Arizona 14–7)

Second quarter

- (5:25) ORE – Onterrio Smith 10-yard run, Jared Siegel kick (Drive: 4 plays, 61 yards, 1:12; Tied 14–14)
- (0:39) ORE – Jared Siegel 53-yard field goal (Drive: 8 plays, 37 yards, 2:56; Oregon 17–14)

Third quarter

- (6:00) ORE – Keenan Howry 33-yard pass from Jason Fife, Jared Siegel kick (Drive: 5 plays, 78 yards, 2:04; Oregon 24–14)

Fourth quarter

- (14:54) ORE – Terrence Whitehead 9-yard pass from Jason Fife, Jared Siegel kick (Drive: 12 plays, 62 yards, 4:58; Oregon 31–14)

Statistics	ORE	ARIZ
First downs	21	16
Total yards	432	332
Rushing yards	43–188	27–30
Passing yards	244	302
Passing: Comp–Att–Int	18–27–0	23–41–1
Time of possession	30:40	29:20

Team	Category	Player	Statistics
Oregon	Passing	Jason Fife	18/26, 244 yards, 2 TD
Oregon	Rushing	Onterrio Smith	28 carries, 145 yards, 2 TD
Oregon	Receiving	Keenan Howry	2 receptions, 49 yards, TD
Arizona	Passing	Jason Johnson	23/41, 302 yards, 2 TD, INT
Arizona	Rushing	Mike Bell	21 carries, 54 yards
Arizona	Receiving	Bobby Wade	12 receptions, 151 yards, TD

After a close win over North Texas (which featured Arizona’s blocked field goal return for a touchdown before halftime), the Wildcats hosted Oregon yet again. Arizona looked great early, leading 14-7 after the opening quarter. However, the eighth-ranked Ducks would take control of the game and shut out the Wildcats the rest of the way. Despite the loss, Wade had a career-high 12 receptions, including a touchdown.

=== at No. 22 Washington ===
Arizona Wildcats (3–2) at No. 22 Washington Huskies (3–2) – Game summary

Quarter	1	2	3	4	Total
Wildcats	7	7	7	7	28
No. 22 Huskies	3	13	10	6	32

at Husky Stadium • Seattle, WA

- Date: October 12, 2002
- Game time: 12:30 P.M.
- Game weather: Sunny, Clear, 54 °F (12 °C)
- Game attendance: 71,016
- Referee: Jack Folliard
- TV: Fox Sports Arizona

Game information

First quarter

- (9:15) ARIZ – Beau Carr 1-yard run, Bobby Gill kick (Drive: 14 plays, 80 yards, 5:45; Arizona 7–0)
- (2:42) WASH – John Anderson 37-yard field goal (Drive: 14 plays, 60 yards, 6:33; Arizona 7–3)

Second quarter

- (10:21) WASH – Rich Alexis 3-yard run, John Anderson kick (Drive: 10 plays, 62 yards, 5:04; Washington 10–7)
- (2:00) WASH – Reggie Williams 10-yard pass from Cody Pickett, kick failed (Drive: 10 plays, 77 yards, 4:59; Washington 16–7)
- (0:49) ARIZ – Bobby Wade 2-yard pass from Jason Johnson, Bobby Gill kick (Drive: 7 plays, 65 yards, 1:11; Washington 16–14)

Third quarter

- (11:40) WASH – Reggie Williams 26-yard pass from Cody Pickett, John Anderson kick (Drive: 8 plays, 65 yards, 3:20; Washington 23–14)
- (2:50) WASH – John Anderson 52-yard field goal (Drive: 4 plays, 7 yards, 0:54; Washington 26–14)
- (0:58) ARIZ – Andrae Thurman 20-yard pass from Jason Johnson, Bobby Gill kick (Drive: 5 plays, 80 yards, 1:52; Washington 26–21)

Fourth quarter

- (12:41) ARIZ – Bobby Wade 28-yard pass from Jason Johnson, Bobby Gill kick (Drive: 6 plays, 82 yards, 2:12; Arizona 28–26)
- (2:03) WASH – Reggie Williams 80-yard pass from Cody Pickett, two-point pass failed (Drive: 2 plays, 80 yards, 0:17; Washington 32–28)

Statistics	ARIZ	WASH
First downs	26	24
Total yards	467	427
Rushing yards	29–24	38–96
Passing yards	443	345
Passing: Comp–Att–Int	29–41–1	25–35–0
Time of possession	26:57	33:02

Team	Category	Player	Statistics
Arizona	Passing	Jason Johnson	29/41, 443 yards, 3 TD, INT
Arizona	Rushing	Mike Bell	19 carries, 54 yards
Arizona	Receiving	Bobby Wade	10 receptions, 155 yards, 2 TD
Washington	Passing	Cody Pickett	25/35, 345 yards, 3 TD
Washington	Rushing	Rich Alexis	23 carries, 56 yards, TD
Washington	Receiving	Reggie Williams	8 receptions, 184 yards, 3 TD

The Wildcats visited Washington for the third straight season. Arizona would lead in the fourth quarter, only to see the #22 Huskies come back with a long touchdown catch and run past their secondary and gave the Wildcats another stunning loss for the third year in a row.

=== at Stanford ===
Arizona Wildcats (3–3) at Stanford Cardinal (1–4) – Game summary

Quarter	1	2	3	4	Total
Wildcats	3	3	0	0	6
Cardinal	10	0	3	3	16

at Stanford Stadium • Stanford, CA

- Date: October 19, 2002
- Game time: 2:00 P.M.
- Game weather: Sunny and clear, 71 °F (22 °C)
- Game attendance: 33,800
- Referee: Jim Fogltance
- TV: Fox Sports Arizona

Game information

First quarter

- (9:55) STAN – Michael Sgroi 45-yard field goal (Drive: 12 plays, 40 yards, 3:27; Stanford 3–0)
- (8:13) STAN – Alex Smith 12-yard pass from Chris Lewis, Michael Sgroi kick (Drive: 2 plays, 17 yards, 0:08; Stanford 10–0)
- (1:47) ARIZ – Bobby Gill 25-yard field goal (Drive: 4 plays, 6 yards, 1:35; Stanford 10–3)

Second quarter

- (0:02) ARIZ – Bobby Gill 23-yard field goal (Drive: 10 plays, 62 yards, 3:53; Stanford 10–6)

Third quarter

- (8:01) STAN – Michael Sgroi 27-yard field goal (Drive: 15 plays, 70 yards, 6:59; Stanford 13–6)

Fourth quarter

- (2:21) STAN – Michael Sgroi 21-yard field goal (Drive: 19 plays, 83 yards, 9:06; Stanford 16–6)

Statistics	ARIZ	STAN
First downs	14	24
Total yards	266	372
Rushing yards	23–22	49–175
Passing yards	244	197
Passing: Comp–Att–Int	19–31–3	21–37–1
Time of possession	23:18	36:42

Team	Category	Player	Statistics
Arizona	Passing	Jason Johnson	19/30, 244 yards, 3 INT
Arizona	Rushing	Beau Carr	9 carries, 44 yards
Arizona	Receiving	Bobby Wade	8 receptions, 121 yards
Stanford	Passing	Chris Lewis	14/27, 126 yards, TD
Stanford	Rushing	Kerry Carter	27 carries, 98 yards
Stanford	Receiving	Alex Smith	8 receptions, 120 yards, TD

=== vs No. 9 Washington State ===
No. 9 Washington State Cougars (6–1) vs Arizona Wildcats (3–4) – Game summary

Quarter	1	2	3	4	Total
No. 9 Cougars	2	3	9	7	21
Wildcats	0	10	3	0	13

at Arizona Stadium • Tucson, AZ

- Date: October 26, 2002
- Game time: 7:00 P.M.
- Game weather: Partly cloudy, 67 °F (19 °C)
- Game attendance: 46,462
- Referee: David Cutaia
- TV: Fox Sports Arizona

Game information

First quarter

- (3:57) WSU – Team safety (Washington State 2–0)

Second quarter

- (6:21) ARIZ – Bobby Gill 47-yard field goal (Drive: 7 plays, 42 yards, 2:08; Arizona 3–2)
- (2:45) WSU – Drew Dunning 22-yard field goal (Drive: 8 plays, 70 yards, 3:26; Washington State 5–3)
- (0:51) ARIZ – Bobby Wade 27-yard pass from Jason Johnson, Bobby Gill kick (Drive: 7 plays, 61 yards, 1:40; Arizona 10–5)

Third quarter

- (11:38) WSU – Drew Dunning 36-yard field goal (Drive: 11 plays, 61 yards, 3:13; Arizona 10–8)
- (4:59) ARIZ – Bobby Gill 42-yard field goal (Drive: 19 plays, 61 yards, 6:30; Arizona 13–8)
- (2:04) WSU – Devard Darling 16-yard pass from Jason Gesser, two-point run failed (Drive: 10 plays, 67 yards, 2:42; Washington State 14–13)

Fourth quarter

- (7:37) WSU – Jermaine Green 18-yard run, Drew Dunning kick (Drive: 4 plays, 32 yards, 1:53; Washington State 21–13)

Statistics	WSU	ARIZ
First downs	24	14
Total yards	424	207
Rushing yards	46–149	21– -17
Passing yards	275	224
Passing: Comp–Att–Int	20–35–0	22–46–2
Time of possession	32:53	27:07

Team	Category	Player	Statistics
Washington State	Passing	Jason Gesser	20/35, 275 yards, TD
Washington State	Rushing	Jermaine Green	29 carries, 119 yards, TD
Washington State	Receiving	Troy Bienemann	3 receptions, 66 yards
Arizona	Passing	Jason Johnson	22/46, 224 yards, TD, 2 INT
Arizona	Rushing	Mike Bell	7 carries, 25 yards
Arizona	Receiving	Andrae Thurman	7 receptions, 89 yards

Arizona returned home and played against ninth-ranked Washington State, who ironically, was the team that the Wildcats beat for their last Pac-10 home win in 2000 (when they still had Dick Tomey as coach before hiring Mackovic). The defense, led by Briggs, would keep the Wildcats in it, but the offense sputtered, mostly due to being blitzed by the Cougars. Arizona would make crucial mistakes in the final quarter after having chances to come back, and would lead to another loss.

=== at Oregon State ===
Arizona Wildcats (3–5) at Oregon State Beavers (5–3) – Game summary

Quarter	1	2	3	4	Total
Wildcats	0	0	3	0	3
Beavers	14	14	3	7	38

at Reser Stadium • Corvallis, OR

- Date: November 2, 2002
- Game time: 2:00 P.M.
- Game weather: Sunny, Clear, 48 °F (9 °C)
- Game attendance: 36,644
- Referee: Chuck McFerrin
- TV: Fox Sports Arizona

Game information

First quarter

- (11:45) OSU – Steven Jackson 5-yard run, Kirk Yliniemi kick (Drive: 11 plays, 65 yards, 3:15; Oregon State 7–0)
- (3:48) OSU – Derek Anderson 1-yard run, Kirk Yliniemi kick (Drive: 7 plays, 60 yards, 2:23; Oregon State 14–0)

Second quarter

- (14:17) OSU – James Newson 86-yard pass from Derek Anderson, Kirk Yliniemi kick (Drive: 1 play, 86 yards, 0:12; Oregon State 21–0)
- (1:02) OSU – Steven Jackson 1-yard run, Kirk Yliniemi kick (Drive: 8 plays, 75 yards, 3:38; Oregon State 28–0)

Third quarter

- (4:08) OSU – Kirk Yliniemi 28-yard field goal (Drive: 8 plays, 24 yards, 3:08; Oregon State 31–0)
- (1:02) ARIZ – Bobby Gill 43-yard field goal (Drive: 7 plays, 44 yards, 2:58; Oregon State 31–3)

Fourth quarter

- (2:20) OSU – Dan Haines 13-yard pass from Adam Rothenfluh, Kirk Yliniemi kick (Drive: 8 plays, 46 yards, 4:29; Oregon State 38–3)

Statistics	ARIZ	OSU
First downs	12	20
Total yards	93	457
Rushing yards	25– -23	48–193
Passing yards	116	264
Passing: Comp–Att–Int	15–33–0	14–31–0
Time of possession	28:15	31:45

Team	Category	Player	Statistics
Arizona	Passing	Jason Johnson	14/28, 105 yards
Arizona	Rushing	Beau Carr	11 carries, 36 yards
Arizona	Receiving	Andrae Thurman	5 receptions, 45 yards
Oregon State	Passing	Derek Anderson	12/28, 239 yards, TD
Oregon State	Rushing	Steven Jackson	27 carries, 134 yards, 2 TD
Oregon State	Receiving	James Newson	6 receptions, 121 yards, TD

=== vs UCLA ===
UCLA Bruins (6–3) vs Arizona Wildcats (3–6) – Game summary

Quarter	1	2	3	4	Total
Bruins	10	10	14	3	37
Wildcats	0	7	0	0	7

at Arizona Stadium • Tucson, AZ

- Date: November 9, 2002
- Game time: 7:30 P.M.
- Game weather: Clear Skies, 66 °F (19 °C)
- Game attendance: 43,613
- Referee: Jay Stricherz
- TV: Fox Sports Arizona

Game information

First quarter

- (12:47) UCLA – Tyler Ebell 22-yard run, Nate Fikse kick (Drive: 7 plays, 80 yards, 2:13; UCLA 7–0)
- (8:52) UCLA – Nate Fikse 39-yard field goal (Drive: 8 plays, 57 yards, 2:45; UCLA 10–0)

Second quarter

- (12:45) UCLA – Tyler Ebell 19-yard run, Nate Fikse kick (Drive: 10 plays, 54 yards, 4:01; UCLA 17–0)
- (10:42) ARIZ – Andrae Thurman 92-yard pass from Nic Costa, Bobby Gill kick (Drive: 3 plays, 80 yards, 1:58; UCLA 17–7)
- (8:02) UCLA – Nate Fikse 51-yard field goal (Drive: 6 plays, 43 yards, 2:30; UCLA 20–7)

Third quarter

- (13:45) UCLA – Craig Bragg 33-yard pass from Drew Olson, Nate Fikse kick (Drive: 1 play, 33 yards, 0:10; UCLA 27–7)
- (6:51) UCLA – Manuel White 1-yard run, Nate Fikse kick (Drive: 10 plays, 61 yards, 5:06; UCLA 34–7)

Fourth quarter

- (14:51) UCLA – Nate Fikse 23-yard field goal (Drive: 11 plays, 50 yards, 4:41; UCLA 37–7)

Statistics	UCLA	ARIZ
First downs	21	9
Total yards	443	249
Rushing yards	51–242	28–12
Passing yards	201	237
Passing: Comp–Att–Int	13–20–0	13–27–0
Time of possession	33:34	26:26

Team	Category	Player	Statistics
UCLA	Passing	Drew Olson	7/12, 111 yards, TD
UCLA	Rushing	Tyler Ebell	22 carries, 124 yards, 2 TD
UCLA	Receiving	Tab Perry	3 receptions, 89 yards
Arizona	Passing	Jason Johnson	11/23, 133 yards
Arizona	Rushing	Gainus Scott	8 carries, 32 yards
Arizona	Receiving	Andrae Thurman	5 receptions, 118 yards, TD

On homecoming day, the Wildcats hosted UCLA. Arizona’s offense continued to struggle, and only scored on a long catch and run for a touchdown that would prevent a shutout. The defense was hurt by penalties and poor tackling, leading to the Bruins scoring over 30 points. The Wildcats would go on to drop their sixth consecutive loss of the year.

==== Mackovic controversy ====
Controversy erupted days after the loss, when Mackovic told one of his players that his poor blocking during the game made him a “disgrace to his family”, which hurt his feelings, as well as his teammates. Led by Briggs, the players reported the incident to both the Arizona president and athletic director, and discussed about a series of abuses by Mackovic, including one where Mackovic made a meltdown to the team after the loss to Wisconsin earlier in the season. The news made headlines around the Arizona campus as well as Tucson. In a press conference, Mackovic issued an apology to the program and the community and promised to treat respect to the team. Despite fans calling for his firing for both his behavior and the team’s losses, Mackovic would remain the coach through the end of the season.

=== at California ===
Arizona Wildcats (3–6) at California Golden Bears (6–4) – Game summary

Quarter	1	2	3	4	Total
Wildcats	0	24	7	21	52
Golden Bears	3	14	14	10	41

at California Memorial Stadium • Berkeley, CA

- Date: November 16, 2002
- Game time: 1:30 P.M.
- Game weather: Hazy, 66 °F (19 °C)
- Game attendance: 28,808
- Referee: Gordon Riese
- TV: Fox Sports Arizona

Game information

First quarter

- (8:18) CAL – Mark Jensen 43-yard field goal (Drive: 10 plays, 33 yards, 4:43; California 3–0)

Second quarter

- (14:50) ARIZ – Justin Levasseur 1-yard pass from Jason Johnson, Bobby Gill kick (Drive: 3 plays, 76 yards, 0:42; Arizona 7–3)
- (12:32) ARIZ – Ray Wells 42-yard interception return, Bobby Gill kick (Arizona 14–3)
- (12:15) CAL – LaShaun Ward 94-yard kickoff return, Mark Jensen kick (Arizona 14–10)
- (8:42) ARIZ – Bobby Gill 30-yard field goal (Drive: 8 plays, 72 yards, 3:33; Arizona 17–10)
- (3:15) CAL – LaShaun Ward 25-yard pass from Kyle Boller, Mark Jensen kick (Drive: 7 plays, 77 yards, 1:14; Tied 17–17)
- (1:52) ARIZ – Lance Relford 31-yard pass from Jason Johnson, Bobby Gill kick (Drive: 5 plays, 67 yards, 1:23; Arizona 24–17)

Third quarter

- (13:44) CAL – James Bethea 60-yard blocked field goal return, Mark Jensen kick (Tied 24–24)
- (12:37) ARIZ – Lamon Means 27-yard blocked punt return, Bobby Gill kick (Arizona 31–24)
- (2:06) CAL – Joe Igber 38-yard run, Mark Jensen kick (Drive: 4 plays, 61 yards, 1:08; Tied 31–31)

Fourth quarter

- (14:57) CAL – Mark Jensen 19-yard field goal (Drive: 4 plays, 9 yards, 1:51; California 34–31)
- (12:37) ARIZ – Justin Levasseur 9-yard pass from Jason Johnson, Bobby Gill kick (Drive: 5 plays, 68 yards, 6:12; Arizona 38–34)
- (8:45) ARIZ – Bobby Wade 7-yard pass from Jason Johnson, Bobby Gill kick (Drive: 8 plays, 58 yards, 3:52; Arizona 45–34)
- (3:57) ARIZ – Beau Carr 4-yard run, Bobby Gill kick (Drive: 7 plays, 76 yards, 3:09; Arizona 52–34)
- (0:37) CAL – Tom Swoboda 11-yard pass from Kyle Boller, Mark Jensen kick (Drive: 9 plays, 50 yards, 2:10; Arizona 52–41)

Statistics	ARIZ	CAL
First downs	23	20
Total yards	487	356
Rushing yards	32– -5	27–58
Passing yards	492	298
Passing: Comp–Att–Int	31–45–1	22–45–2
Time of possession	32:39	30:33

Team	Category	Player	Statistics
Arizona	Passing	Jason Johnson	31/45, 492 yards, 4 TD, INT
Arizona	Rushing	Gilbert Harris	27 carries, 165 yards
Arizona	Receiving	Bobby Wade	11 receptions, 222 yards, TD
California	Passing	Kyle Boller	22/45, 298 yards, 2 TD, 2 INT
California	Rushing	Joe Igber	19 carries, 90 yards, TD
California	Receiving	Tom Swoboda	7 receptions, 83 yards, TD

After moving on from the Mackovic fiasco, Arizona visited California, looking to break their losing streak. The Wildcats would dominate on offense, throwing for nearly 500 yards. Wade had over 200 yards receiving and tight end Justin Levasseur, who was the player that Mackovic mistreated which started the controversy, caught a touchdown pass to give Arizona the lead for good. The Wildcats’ defense would play poor, but their offensive performance was just enough for them to get past the Golden Bears to end their slump for their first Pac-10 win in a high-scoring match. It was the second consecutive year that Mackovic won his first conference game at California.

=== vs Arizona State ===
Arizona State Sun Devils (7–5) vs Arizona Wildcats (4–7) – Game summary

Quarter	1	2	3	4	Total
Sun Devils	3	7	10	14	34
Wildcats	7	6	7	0	20

at Arizona Stadium • Tucson, AZ

- Date: November 29, 2002
- Game time: 1:00 P.M.
- Game weather: Partly Cloudy, 62 °F (17 °C)
- Game attendance: 47,005
- Referee: Jim Fogltance
- TV: Fox Sports Arizona

Game information

First quarter

- (5:53) ASU – Mike Barth 27-yard field goal (Drive: 4 plays, 1 yards, 1:31; Arizona State 3–0)
- (2:51) ARIZ – Beau Carr 1-yard run, Sean Keel kick (Drive: 7 plays, 70 yards, 2:54; Arizona 7–3)

Second quarter

- (10:24) ASU – Mike Williams 5-yard run, Mike Barth kick (Drive: 10 plays, 94 yards, 4:32; Arizona State 10–7)
- (0:54) ARIZ – Beau Carr 6-yard run, kick failed (Drive: 10 plays, 100 yards, 3:34; Arizona 13–10)

Third quarter

- (10:38) ASU – Mike Barth 32-yard field goal (Drive: 11 plays, 64 yards, 4:18; Tied 13–13)
- (6:51) ARIZ – Biren Ealy 10-yard pass from Jason Johnson, Bobby Gill kick (Drive: 8 plays, 73 yards, 3:18; Arizona 20–13)
- (1:55) ASU – Mike Williams 4-yard run, Mike Barth kick (Drive: 13 plays, 84 yards, 4:47; Tied 20–20)

Fourth quarter

- (9:10) ASU – Mike Williams 8-yard run, Mike Barth kick (Drive: 10 plays, 85 yards, 4:14; Arizona State 27–20)
- (6:51) ASU – Mike Williams 4-yard run, Mike Barth kick (Drive: 4 plays, 21 yards, 2:06; Arizona State 34–20)

Statistics	ASU	ARIZ
First downs	27	20
Total yards	461	331
Rushing yards	49–166	25–62
Passing yards	295	269
Passing: Comp–Att–Int	25–35–2	17–31–3
Time of possession	36:00	24:00

Team	Category	Player	Statistics
Arizona State	Passing	Andrew Walter	25/35, 295 yards, 2 INT
Arizona State	Rushing	Mike Williams	40 carries, 162 yards, 4 TD
Arizona State	Receiving	Mike Pinkard	6 receptions, 80 yards
Arizona	Passing	Jason Johnson	17/31, 269 yards, TD, 3 INT
Arizona	Rushing	Mike Bell	12 carries, 70 yards
Arizona	Receiving	Bobby Wade	6 receptions, 109 yards

Mackovic looked to earn his second straight “Duel in the Desert” win as the Wildcats went back to Tucson to face Arizona State in the rivalry game. Arizona donned blue pants for the game, which was the first time that they wore them at home in their history (they had worn white pants for all home games before then).

In a game that was filled with turnovers and penalties, the Wildcats led 13-10 at the half, but would make the more crucial mistakes that would cost them, as ASU would capitalize in the second half and would outscore Arizona to end the Wildcats’ season with a 4-8 record. Both Wade and Briggs finished their Wildcat careers with a 1–3 record against the Sun Devils and no bowl appearances. Several mistakes thwarted scoring chances for Arizona and near the end of the game, the Wildcats’ student section chanted for Mackovic to be fired and the Wildcats’ futile season was finally over.

== Roster ==
2002 Arizona Wildcats football team roster
Players
Coaches
Offense

Pos.	#	Name	Class
WR	1	Bobby Wade	Sr
WR	4	Andrae Thurman	Jr
WR	5	Mike Jefferson	Fr
QB	7	Nic Costa	Fr
QB	10	Jason Johnson	Sr
WR	11	Gens Goodman	Sr
QB	15	Ryan O'Hara	Fr
QB	17	Phil Linduska	Fr
WR	18	Lance Relford	Jr
RB	21	Beau Carr	Fr
RB	23	Gainus Scott	Fr
RB	26	Mike Bell	Fr
RB	32	Clarence Farmer	Jr
RB	34	Chris Harris	So
FB	35	Sean Jones	Fr
FB	36	Gilbert Harris	Fr
FB	37	Joseph Willrodt	Sr
RB	39	Seth Crozier	Fr
FB	45	Antoine Singfield	Fr
TE	46	Matt Padron	Fr
OL	65	John Vorsheck	Sr
OL	66	Kili Lefotu	Fr
OL	67	Keoki Fraser	So
OT	68	Brandon Phillips	Jr
OT	70	John Parada	Fr
OL	72	Tanner Bell	Sr
OL	73	Aaron Higginbotham	Sr
OL	75	Reggie Sampay	Jr
OT	76	Matt Lamatsch	Jr
OT	77	Makoa Freitas	So
OL	78	Darren Safranek	Sr
OT	79	Keith Jackson	Fr
WR	81	Juan Valentine	Jr
WR	82	Biren Ealy	Fr
WR	83	Scott Altick	Sr
WR	84	Ricky Williams	So
WR	85	Willis Morrison	Fr
TE	86	Mitchell Willis	Fr
TE	87	Steve Fleming	So
TE	89	James Hugo	Sr

Defense

Pos.	#	Name	Class
CB	2	David Hinton	Sr
CB	3	Jason Martin	Fr
CB	5	Bennie Brown	Fr
DB	6	Darrell Brooks	Fr
LB	7	Ray Wells	Sr
CB	8	Michael Jolivette	Jr
DB	9	Gary Love	Jr
S	12	Adam Moro	Fr
CB	13	Luis Nunez	Jr
DB	14	Jerome Parker	Fr
CB	17	Gary Shepard	Fr
S	19	Lamon Means	Fr
S	24	Anthony Fulcher	Jr
LB	25	Kirk Johnson	So
S	29	Danny Perry	So
S	33	Clay Hardt	Jr
LB	27	Lance Briggs	Sr
S	30	Tony Wingate	So
S	31	Justin Jochum	So
DB	35	Anderson Phillips	Fr
DB	37	Johnny Bailey	Sr
LB	38	Akin Akinniyi	Fr
LB	40	John McKinney	Fr
LB	41	Scott McKee	Sr
LB	42	Joe Siofele	Jr
LB	44	Patrick Howard	So
DB	46	Lee Patterson	So
S	47	Jarvie Worcester	Sr
S	48	Landon Kafentzis	Fr
LB	49	Matt Molina	Jr
LB	50	Ben Dalmolin	So
LB	51	Spencer Larsen	Fr
LB	53	Pedro Limon	Fr
DE	55	Marcus Smith	Fr
DE	56	Andre Torrey	Jr
LB	57	Justin Stewart	So
DE	58	Tim Volk	Fr
OL	59	Chris Johnson	So
DL	61	Robert Ramsey	Sr
LB	62	Nick McCalmont	Fr
DL	67	Jeremy Willoughby	Fr
DL	69	John Abramo	Fr
DL	83	Copeland Bryan	Fr
DE	85	Javier Martinez	Jr
DL	86	Marlon Brisco	Fr
DT	90	Carl Tuitavuli	Jr
DT	91	Brad Brittain	Fr
DE	92	Carlos Williams	So
DT	93	Young Thompson	Sr
DL	94	Paul Philipp	Fr
DL	95	Jake Belshe	Fr
DL	96	Matt Lam	Fr
DE	97	Isaac Watts	Fr
DL	98	Fata Avegalio	So
DL	99	Vince Feula	So

Special teams

Pos.	#	Name	Class
K	3	Sean Keel	Sr
P	12	Ramey Peru	Jr
K	16	Nick Folk	Fr
P	20	James Molina	Jr
K	28	Bobby Gill	Jr
P	29	Ryan Fusco	Fr
K	34	Ryan Slack	So
P	43	Danny Baugher	Fr

Head coach

- John Mackovic

Coordinators/assistant coaches

- Rick Dykes – Offensive coordinator
- Larry Mac Duff – Defensive coordinator

Legend

- (C) Team captain
- (S) Suspended
- (I) Ineligible
- Injured
- Redshirt

Roster

== Awards and honors ==
- Bobby Wade, WR, First-team All-Pac-10
- Lance Briggs, LB, First-team All-Pac-10
- Ray Wells, LB, First-team All-Pac-10
- Makoa Freitas, OL, Second-team All-Pac-10

== Season notes ==
- Arizona played twelve games in a season for the first time since 1999.
- Arizona opened the year against Northern Arizona and the two would play often frequently since then (NAU would play ASU a few times). The Wildcats would dominate NAU in most of their future matchups until NAU would finally win in 2021.
- The Wildcats would not beat Utah again until 2012, when Utah and Arizona became conference foes.
- This was the first and only time that Arizona and North Texas would meet (the Wildcats defeated the Mean Green in a game that featured Arizona scoring on a blocked kick, which remains the most recent time that they would return a blocked field goal for a score).
- This was the third consecutive year that Arizona had a near-miss of defeating Washington after the Huskies scoring late to win.
- The Wildcats did not score a touchdown in their losses to Stanford and Oregon State (both on the road). The former would be Stanford’s only conference win of the season and the latter being an identical final score from the previous season (38-3).
- The game against California (which aired on FSN) was not broadcast live in the Tucson market, supposedly due to the controversy involving Mackovic. Arizona fans would eventually view the game, as FSN aired it on a tape delay later that day as well as the following day.
- The win over Cal would be the only good thing for the team following the Mackovic controversy, as Arizona officials believed that the Wildcats would not win a big game as long as Mackovic was coach due to his troubles.
- In the loss to Arizona State, fans who were furious over Mackovic and the inability to win big games, chanted “Fire Mackovic” and “We have basketball” as time expired at the end of the game, referring the fact that they were relived that the season was over and wanted the Wildcats to get a new coach to bring honesty, and looked to basketball as that program was continuing to be dominant.
- With Arizona continuously losing in Pac-10 play and the fallout of Mackovic late in the season, it broke the promise of him leading the team to the Rose Bowl as coach when he was hired before the 2001 season.
- As Wade would graduate after the season, this was officially the last year of Arizona’s “Desert Storm” era (a phrase that referenced the Wildcats’ dominant offense that began in their big 1998 season and was a pun on their dominant “Desert Swarm” defense under Tomey in the early 1990s).
- Wade made Arizona history this season, as he caught 93 passes, which broke the Arizona record for most receptions for a receiver in a single season. Wade passed Dennis Northcutt’s record of 88 from 1999 and the 93 receptions in 2002 is still an Arizona record to this day. Also, Wade is second to Northcutt in terms of single-season receiving yards with 1,389 this season (Northcutt had 1,422 in 1999) and holds the record for career receiving yards with 3,351, surpassing Northcutt’s record of 3,252. Wade is behind Northcutt with 23 touchdowns (Northcutt had 24) and held the Arizona record of career receptions with 230 until Mike Thomas broke it in 2008 with 259.
- Arizona’s 1–7 conference record would end up being one of the worst records in their history. They would also tie that record in the following year.

== After the season ==
As Arizona finished with yet another losing season, Mackovic was retained for the 2003 season, despite fans calling for him to be fired. However, Mac Duff was fired as defensive coordinator due to the team’s poor defensive performance, which ended his Arizona career for good. The Wildcats struggled on defense in Mac Duff’s second stint with the program, as opposed to his first when they were dominant under him and Tomey.

Many players considered leaving the team or transferring to other schools during the offseason as a result of Mackovic’s behavior. It would affect recruiting and fan interest, leading to a worst 2003 season, where Mackovic would finally be fired as coach.
