= 2002 Oregon Ducks football team =

American college football season

2002 Oregon Ducks football

Seattle Bowl, L 17–38 vs. Wake Forest
- Conference: Pacific-10 Conference
- Record: 7–6 (3–5 Pac-10)
- Head coach: Mike Bellotti (8th season)
- Offensive coordinator: Andy Ludwig (1st season)
- Offensive scheme: Pro spread
- Defensive coordinator: Nick Aliotti (6th season)
- Base defense: 4–3
- Captain: Game captains
- Home stadium: Autzen Stadium

2002 Pacific-10 Conference football standings
	Conf.			Overall
Team	W		L	W		L
No. 10 Washington State $+	7	–	1	10	–	3
No. 4 USC %+	7	–	1	11	–	2
Arizona State	5	–	3	8	–	6
Oregon State	4	–	4	8	–	5
UCLA	4	–	4	8	–	5
California	4	–	4	7	–	5
Washington	4	–	4	7	–	6
Oregon	3	–	5	7	–	6
Arizona	1	–	7	4	–	8
Stanford	1	–	7	2	–	9
$ – BCS representative as conference champion; % – BCS at-large representative; + – Conference co-champions; Rankings from AP Poll

The 2002 Oregon Ducks football team represented the University of Oregon as a member of the Pacific-10 Conference (Pac-10) during the 2002 NCAA Division I-A football season. Led by eighth-year head coach Mike Bellotti, the Ducks compiled an overall record of 7–6 with a mark of 3–5 in conference play, placing eight in the Pac-10. Oregon was invited to the Seattle Bowl, where the Ducks lost to Wake Forest. The team played home games at Autzen Stadium in Eugene, Oregon.

== Before the season ==
=== Recruiting ===
College recruiting
Name	Hometown	School	Height	Weight	40^{‡}	Commit date
Haloti Ngata; DT	Salt Lake City	Highland HS	6 ft 5 in (1.96 m)	309 lb (140 kg)	4.8	Feb 6, 2002
Haloti Ngata; DT	Recruit ratings: Scout: Rivals:					
Chris Solomona; DT	Torrance, California	El Camino CC	6 ft 5 in (1.96 m)	285 lb (129 kg)	4.8	Feb 7, 2002
Chris Solomona; DT	Recruit ratings: Scout: Rivals:					
Kellen Taylor; WR	San Francisco	CC of San Francisco	6 ft 1 in (1.85 m)	180 lb (82 kg)	4.5	Feb 6, 2002
Kellen Taylor; WR	Recruit ratings: Scout: Rivals:					
Albert Toeaina; OL	Antioch, California	Pittsburg HS	6 ft 5 in (1.96 m)	335 lb (152 kg)	5.2	Feb 6, 2002
Albert Toeaina; OL	Recruit ratings: Scout: Rivals:					
Marques Binns; CB	Los Angeles	Susan Miller Dorsey HS	6 ft 0 in (1.83 m)	165 lb (75 kg)	4.4	Jan 29, 2002
Marques Binns; CB	Recruit ratings: Scout: Rivals:					
James Finley; WR	Los Angeles	Manual Arts Senior HS	6 ft 3 in (1.91 m)	193 lb (88 kg)	4.5	Mar 7, 2002
James Finley; WR	Recruit ratings: Scout: Rivals:					
David Dixon; CB	San Marcos, California	Palomar College	5 ft 11 in (1.80 m)	168 lb (76 kg)	NA	Feb 6, 2002
David Dixon; CB	Recruit ratings: Scout: Rivals:					
Parris Moore; CB	Fountain Valley, California	Fountain Valley HS	5 ft 11 in (1.80 m)	170 lb (77 kg)	4.5	NA
Parris Moore; CB	Recruit ratings: Scout: Rivals:					
Aaron Gipson; CB	Fontana, California	Fontana HS	5 ft 9 in (1.75 m)	170 lb (77 kg)	4.5	Jan 27, 2002
Aaron Gipson; CB	Recruit ratings: Scout: Rivals:					
Enoka Lucas; OL	Honolulu, HI	Kamehameha HS	6 ft 4 in (1.93 m)	285 lb (129 kg)	5.1	Jan 5, 2002
Enoka Lucas; OL	Recruit ratings: Scout: Rivals:					
Tate Pittman; LB	Scottsdale, Arizona	Fork Union Mil. Adc.	6 ft 1 in (1.85 m)	225 lb (102 kg)	4.7	NA
Tate Pittman; LB	Recruit ratings: Scout: Rivals:					
Andy Collins; QB	Zillah, WA	Zillah HS	6 ft 2 in (1.88 m)	195 lb (88 kg)	4.7	Dec 17, 2001
Andy Collins; QB	Recruit ratings: Scout: Rivals:					
Robert Hamilton; LB	Inglewood, California	Westchester HS	6 ft 2 in (1.88 m)	195 lb (88 kg)	NA	Feb 6, 2002
Robert Hamilton; LB	Recruit ratings: Scout: Rivals:					
Cory Larson; LB	Gresham, Oregon	Gresham HS	6 ft 2 in (1.88 m)	195 lb (88 kg)	NA	Feb 6, 2002
Cory Larson; LB	Recruit ratings: Scout: Rivals:					
J. D. Nelson; ATH	Mountain View, California	Mountain View HS	5 ft 11 in (1.80 m)	186 lb (84 kg)	NA	Feb 6, 2002
J. D. Nelson; ATH	Recruit ratings: Scout: Rivals:					
Shawn Perkins; DT	Pendleton, Oregon	Pendleton HS	6 ft 6 in (1.98 m)	268 lb (122 kg)	4.9	Dec 28, 2001
Shawn Perkins; DT	Recruit ratings: Scout: Rivals:					
Jermaine Randolph; OL	Fremont, California	Serra HS	6 ft 5 in (1.96 m)	251 lb (114 kg)	4.9	Feb 6, 2002
Jermaine Randolph; OL	Recruit ratings: Scout: Rivals:					
Tarell Richards; CB	West Valley City, Utah	Hunter HS	5 ft 11 in (1.80 m)	180 lb (82 kg)	4.4	NA
Tarell Richards; CB	Recruit ratings: Scout: Rivals:					
Junior Siavii; DT	Oroville, California	Butte CC	6 ft 5 in (1.96 m)	335 lb (152 kg)	NA	Feb 6, 2002
Junior Siavii; DT	Recruit ratings: Scout: Rivals:					
Matt Toeaina; RB	Pago Pago, AS	Samoana HS	6 ft 2 in (1.88 m)	225 lb (102 kg)	NA	Feb 6, 2002
Matt Toeaina; RB	Recruit ratings: Scout: Rivals:					
Anthony Trucks; ATH	Antioch, California	Antioch HS	6 ft 2 in (1.88 m)	195 lb (88 kg)	4.5	Jan 3, 2002
Anthony Trucks; ATH	Recruit ratings: Scout: Rivals:					
Terrence Whitehead; S	Los Angeles	Crenshaw Senior HS	5 ft 10 in (1.78 m)	200 lb (91 kg)	NA	Feb 6, 2002
Terrence Whitehead; S	Recruit ratings: Scout: Rivals:					
Overall recruit ranking: Scout: 31 Rivals: 49
‡ Refers to 40-yard dash; Note: In many cases, Scout, Rivals, 247Sports, On3, and ESPN may conflict in their listings of height, weight and 40 time.; In these cases, the average was taken. ESPN grades are on a 100-point scale.; Sources: "Oregon Football Commitment List 2002". Rivals.; "Oregon College Football Recruiting Commits 2002". Scout.; "Scout.com Team Recruiting Rankings". Scout.; "2002 Team Ranking". Rivals.com.

== Schedule ==
Date	Time	Opponent	Rank	Site	TV	Result	Attendance	Source
August 31	3:00 pm	Mississippi State*	No. 15	Autzen Stadium; Eugene, OR	FSN	W 36–13	56,386	
September 7	4:00 pm	Fresno State*	No. 13	Autzen Stadium; Eugene, OR	FSN	W 28–24	56,357	
September 14	12:30 pm	Idaho*	No. 13	Autzen Stadium; Eugene, OR	OSN	W 58–21	55,187	
September 21	4:00 pm	Portland State*	No. 9	Autzen Stadium; Eugene, OR		W 41–0	56,066	
October 5	7:15 pm	at Arizona	No. 8	Arizona Stadium; Tucson, AZ	FSN	W 31–14	47,356	
October 12	12:30 pm	at UCLA	No. 7	Rose Bowl; Pasadena, CA	ABC	W 31–30	68,882	
October 19	12:30 pm	Arizona State	No. 6	Autzen Stadium; Eugene, OR		L 42–45	56,432	
October 26	12:30 pm	No. 15 USC	No. 14	Autzen Stadium; Eugene, OR (rivalry)	ABC	L 33–44	56,754	
November 2	12:30 pm	Stanford	No. 19	Autzen Stadium; Eugene, OR (rivalry)		W 41–14	56,436	
November 9	12:30 pm	at No. 5 Washington State	No. 15	Martin Stadium; Pullman, WA	ABC	L 21–32	37,600	
November 16	12:30 pm	Washington	No. 23	Autzen Stadium; Eugene, OR (rivalry)	ABC	L 14–42	57,112	
November 23	12:30 pm	at Oregon State		Reser Stadium; Corvallis, OR (Civil War)	FSN	L 24–45	37,154	
December 30	2:30 pm	vs. Wake Forest*		Seahawks Stadium; Seattle, WA (Seattle Bowl)	ESPN	L 17–38	38,241	
*Non-conference game; Rankings from AP Poll released prior to the game; All times are in Pacific time

== Game summaries ==
=== Mississippi State ===
Team	1	2	3	4	Total
Mississippi St	0	7	0	6	13
• Oregon	14	13	9	0	36

- Date: August 31
- Location: Autzen Stadium, Eugene, Oregon
- Game start: 6:00 p.m. EST

Scoring summary
1	ORE	Jason Fife 5 yard run (Jared Siegel kick)	Oregon 7–0
1	ORE	George Wrighster 4 yard pass from Jason Fife (Jared Siegel kick)	Oregon 14–0
2	ORE	George Wrighster 27 yard pass from Jason Fife (Jared Siegel kick)	Oregon 21–0
2	ORE	Jared Siegel 39 yard field goal	Oregon 24–0
2	ORE	Jared Siegel 47 yard field goal	Oregon 27–0
2	MSST	Dontae Walker 1 yard run (John Michael Marlin kick)	Oregon 27–7
3	ORE	Jared Siegel 39 yard field goal	Oregon 30–7
3	ORE	Samie Parker 34 yard pass from Jason Fife (kick failed)	Oregon 36–7
4	MSST	Brandon Wright 9 yard pass from Kyle York (pass failed)	Oregon 36–13

Jason Fife's first start for Oregon.

=== at UCLA ===
No. 7 Oregon at UCLA

Team	1	2	3	4	Total
• No. 7 Ducks	7	17	0	7	31
Bruins	14	7	9	0	30

- Date: October 12
- Location: Rose Bowl • Pasadena, California

Scoring summary
1	UCLA	Perry 55-yard pass from Paus (Griffith kick)	UCLA 7–0
1	ORE	Wrighster 17-yard pass from Fife (Siegel kick)	Tie 7–7
1	UCLA	Bragg 53-yard pass from Dubravac (Griffith kick)	UCLA 14–7
2	ORE	Whitehead 37-yard run (Siegel kick)	Tie 14–14
2	ORE	Howry 79-yard punt return (Siegel kick)	Oregon 21–14
2	UCLA	Bragg 71-yard pass from Paus (Griffith kick)	Tie 21–21
2	ORE	Siegel 59-yard field goal	Oregon 24–21
3	UCLA	Griffith 37-yard field goal	Tie 24–24
3	UCLA	Bragg 46-yard pass from Paus (kick blocked)	UCLA 30–24
4	ORE	Howry 74-yard pass from Fife (Siegel kick)	Oregon 31–30

=== No. 15 USC ===
No. 15 USC at No. 14 Oregon

Team	1	2	3	4	Total
• No. 15 Trojans	14	0	20	10	44
No. 14 Ducks	13	6	0	14	33

- Date: October 26
- Location: Autzen Stadium, Eugene, Oregon
- Game attendance: 56,754

== Roster ==
2002 Oregon Ducks football team roster
Players
Coaches
Offense

Pos.	#	Name	Class
WR	1	Samie Parker	Jr
RB	2	Onterrio Smith	Sr
QB		Jason Fife

Defense

Pos.	#	Name	Class

Special teams

Pos.	#	Name	Class

Head coach

- Mike Bellotti

Coordinators/assistant coaches

Legend

- (C) Team captain
- (S) Suspended
- (I) Ineligible
- Injured
- Redshirt
