= 2002 Washington Huskies football team =

American college football season

2002 Washington Huskies football

Sun Bowl, L 24–34 vs. Purdue
- Conference: Pacific-10 Conference
- Record: 7–6 (4–4 Pac-10)
- Head coach: Rick Neuheisel (4th season)
- Offensive coordinator: Keith Gilbertson (4th season)
- Offensive scheme: Spread
- Defensive coordinator: Tim Hundley (4th season)
- Base defense: Multiple
- MVPs: Cody Pickett (offense); Ben Mahdavi (defense)
- Captains: Paul Arnold; Ben Mahdavi; Jafar Williams; Elliot Zajac
- Home stadium: Husky Stadium

2002 Pacific-10 Conference football standings
| | Conf. | | | Overall |
| Team | W | | L | W | | L |
|---|---|---|---|---|---|---|
| No. 10 Washington State $+ | 7 | – | 1 | 10 | – | 3 |
| No. 4 USC %+ | 7 | – | 1 | 11 | – | 2 |
| Arizona State | 5 | – | 3 | 8 | – | 6 |
| Oregon State | 4 | – | 4 | 8 | – | 5 |
| UCLA | 4 | – | 4 | 8 | – | 5 |
| California | 4 | – | 4 | 7 | – | 5 |
| Washington | 4 | – | 4 | 7 | – | 6 |
| Oregon | 3 | – | 5 | 7 | – | 6 |
| Arizona | 1 | – | 7 | 4 | – | 8 |
| Stanford | 1 | – | 7 | 2 | – | 9 |
$ – BCS representative as conference champion; % – BCS at-large representative; + – Conference co-champions; Rankings from AP Poll

The 2002 Washington Huskies football team was an American football team that represented the University of Washington during the 2002 NCAA Division I-A football season. In its fourth season under head coach Rick Neuheisel, the team compiled a 7–6 record, finished in a four-way tie for fourth place in the Pacific-10 Conference, and outscored opponents 398 to 342. Cody Pickett and Ben Mahdavi were selected as the team's most valuable player offensive and defensive players, respectively.

== Schedule ==
| Date | Time | Opponent | Rank | Site | TV | Result | Attendance |
|---|---|---|---|---|---|---|---|
| August 31 | 12:30 p.m. | at No. 13 Michigan* | No. 11 | Michigan Stadium; Ann Arbor, MI (College GameDay) | ABC | L 29–31 | 111,491 |
| September 7 | 12:30 p.m. | San Jose State* | No. 11 | Husky Stadium; Seattle, WA | FSN | W 34–10 | 70,147 |
| September 21 | 7:00 p.m. | Wyoming* | No. 11 | Husky Stadium; Seattle, WA | FSN | W 38–7 | 72,898 |
| September 28 | 12:30 p.m. | Idaho* | No. 13 | Husky Stadium; Seattle, WA | FSN | W 41–27 | 70,070 |
| October 5 | 12:30 p.m. | California | No. 12 | Husky Stadium; Seattle, WA | FSN | L 27–34 | 71,337 |
| October 12 | 12:30 p.m. | Arizona | No. 22 | Husky Stadium; Seattle, WA | FSN | W 32–28 | 71,016 |
| October 19 | 12:30 p.m. | at No. 19 USC | No. 22 | Los Angeles Memorial Coliseum; Los Angeles, CA | ABC | L 21–41 | 52,961 |
| October 26 | 7:00 p.m. | at No. 23 Arizona State | | Sun Devil Stadium; Tempe, AZ | FSN | L 16–27 | 56,101 |
| November 2 | 4:00 p.m. | UCLA | | Husky Stadium; Seattle, WA | TBS | L 24–34 | 72,017 |
| November 9 | 12:30 p.m. | Oregon State | | Husky Stadium; Seattle, WA | FSN | W 41–29 | 72,557 |
| November 16 | 12:30 p.m. | at No. 23 Oregon | | Autzen Stadium; Eugene, OR (rivalry) | ABC | W 42–14 | 57,112 |
| November 23 | 3:30 p.m. | at No. 3 Washington State | | Martin Stadium; Pullman, WA (Apple Cup) | FSN | W 29–26 ^{3OT} | 37,600 |
| December 31 | 11:00 a.m. | vs. Purdue* | | Sun Bowl; El Paso, TX (Sun Bowl) | CBS | L 24–34 | 48,917 |
*Non-conference game; Rankings from AP Poll released prior to the game; All times are in Pacific time

== Northwest Championship ==
Following the UCLA game, the Huskies had a 4–5 record, 1–4 against Pac-10 opponents, and had lost 4 of the last 5 games. The Huskies were at serious risk of a losing season, their first since 1974, and of missing a bowl game.

Through rare happenstance, Washington was scheduled to play the three other Pacific Northwest schools in order to end the season. Neuheisel, sensing an opportunity to motivate his team, declared that despite the thus far disappointing season the Huskies were still fighting to win the "Northwest Championship" by sweeping Oregon State, Oregon, and Washington State in their remaining games.

It was a successful rallying cry, and the Huskies first beat Oregon State. The next week they won at Autzen Stadium, their first win against Oregon at home since 1996. The Huskies capped the season with a triple-overtime victory over No. 3 Washington State in the Apple Cup, claiming the Northwest Championship with back-to-back-to-back wins over the other northwest schools.

== Roster ==
2002 Washington Huskies football team roster
Players
Coaches
Offense

| Pos. | # | Name | Class |
|---|---|---|---|
| RB | 24 | Rich Alexis | Jr |
| WR | 20 | Paul Arnold (C) | Sr |
| C | 72 | Todd Bachert | Jr |
| OT | 65 | Khalif Barnes | So |
| QB | 12 | Taylor Barton | Sr |
| G | 53 | Aaron Butler | So |
| RB | 29 | Braxton Cleman | Sr |
| WR | 82 | Matt DeBord | Fr |
| G | 78 | Dan Dicks | So |
| FB | 22 | Ty Eriks | Fr |
| WR | 10 | Charles Frederick | So |
| WR | 7 | Wilbur Hooks | Sr |
| OT | 67 | Nick Newton | Jr |
| QB | 15 | Casey Paus | Fr |
| QB | 3 | Cody Pickett | Jr |
| WR | 5 | Patrick Reddick | Sr |
| TE | 83 | Joe Toledo | Fr |
| FB | 5 | Zach Tuiasosopo | So |
| TE | 84 | Kevin Ware | Sr |
| WR | 1 | Reggie Williams | So |
| G | 75 | Elliott Zajac (C) | Sr |

Defense

| Pos. | # | Name | Class |
|---|---|---|---|
| CB | 3 | Roc Alexander | Jr |
| FS | 43 | Owen Biddle | Sr |
| SS | 34 | Greg Carothers | Jr |
| LB | 88 | Marquis Cooper | Jr |
| CB | 5 | Sam Cunningham | So |
| LB | 90 | Kai Ellis | Sr |
| DE | 56 | Manase Hopoi | So |
| CB | 21 | Derrick Johnson | So |
| DT | 99 | Tank Johnson | Jr |
| DE | 47 | Anthony Kelley | Sr |
| LB | 41 | Ben Mahdavi (C) | Sr |
| CB | 28 | Chris Massey | Jr |
| DT | 65 | Josh Miller | So |
| DB | 23 | B. J. Newberry | So |
| CB | 13 | Nate Robinson | Fr |
| FS | 38 | James Sims | Fr |
| LB | 1 | Jafar Williams (C) | Sr |

Special teams

| Pos. | # | Name | Class |
|---|---|---|---|
| K | 15 | John Anderson | Sr |
| P | 17 | Derek McLaughlin | So |

Head coach

- Rick Neuheisel (4th year)

Coordinators/assistant coaches

- Keith Gilbertson (OC, TE)
- Tim Hundley (DC, OLB)
- Steve Axman (AHC, QB)
- Randy Hart (DL)
- Bobby Hauck (DB)
- Chuck Heater (RB)
- Cornell Jackson (ILB)
- Bobby Kennedy (WR)
- Brent Myers (OL)

Legend

- (C) Team captain
- (S) Suspended
- (I) Ineligible
- Injured
- Redshirt

Roster

== Team players in the NFL ==
No Washington players were selected in the 2003 NFL draft. The following finished their college career in 2002, were not drafted, but played in the NFL.

| Player | Position | First NFL team |
| Paul Arnold | Wide receiver | Indianapolis Colts |
| Kevin Ware | Tight end | Washington Redskins |

== Notes ==
- Cody Pickett set a new University of Washington record for passing yards in a season with 4,458 yards. Pickett was the first 4,000-yard passer in the Pacific 10 Conference. This eclipsed Cary Conklin's 2,786 yards from 1989. The record is currently held by Michael Penix, Jr..
