= 2002 Oregon State Beavers football team =

American college football season

2002 Oregon State Beavers football

Insight Bowl, L 13–38 vs. Pittsburgh
- Conference: Pacific-10 Conference
- Record: 8–5 (4–4 Pac-10)
- Head coach: Dennis Erickson (4th season)
- Offensive coordinator: Tim Lappano (4th season)
- Offensive scheme: Single-back spread
- Defensive coordinator: Craig Bray (3rd season)
- Base defense: 4–3
- Captains: Nick Barnett; Eric Manning; James Newsom; Richard Seigler
- Home stadium: Reser Stadium

2002 Pacific-10 Conference football standings
	Conf.			Overall
Team	W		L	W		L
No. 10 Washington State $+	7	–	1	10	–	3
No. 4 USC %+	7	–	1	11	–	2
Arizona State	5	–	3	8	–	6
Oregon State	4	–	4	8	–	5
UCLA	4	–	4	8	–	5
California	4	–	4	7	–	5
Washington	4	–	4	7	–	6
Oregon	3	–	5	7	–	6
Arizona	1	–	7	4	–	8
Stanford	1	–	7	2	–	9
$ – BCS representative as conference champion; % – BCS at-large representative; + – Conference co-champions; Rankings from AP Poll

The 2002 Oregon State Beavers football team represented Oregon State University as a member of the Pacific-10 Conference (Pac-10) during the 2002 NCAA Division I-A football season. Led by Dennis Erickson in his fourth and final season as head coach, the Beavers compiled an overall record of 8–5 with a mark of 4–4 in conference play, placing in a four-way tie for fourth in the Pac-10. Oregon State was invited to the Insight Bowl, where the Beavers lost to Pittsburgh. The team played home games at Reser Stadium in Corvallis, Oregon.

After the season, in February 2003, Erickson left for Oregon State to become head coach for the San Francisco 49ers of the National Football League (NFL). Previous head coach Mike Riley was rehired to replace him.

== Schedule ==
Date	Time	Opponent	Rank	Site	TV	Result	Attendance	Source
August 29	7:00 pm	Eastern Kentucky*		Reser Stadium; Corvallis, OR	FSNNW	W 49–10	35,546	
September 5	4:00 pm	at Temple*		Franklin Field; Philadelphia, PA	FSNNW	W 35–3	20,162	
September 14	4:00 pm	UNLV*		Reser Stadium; Corvallis, OR	TBS	W 47–17	36,121	
September 21	3:30 pm	Fresno State*		Reser Stadium; Corvallis, OR	FSN	W 59–19	36,457	
September 28	3:30 pm	at No. 18 USC	No. 23	Los Angeles Memorial Coliseum; Los Angeles, CA	FSN	L 0–22	56,417	
October 5	12:30 pm	UCLA		Reser Stadium; Corvallis, OR	ABC	L 35–43	36,529	
October 12	7:00 pm	at Arizona State		Sun Devil Stadium; Tempe, AZ	FSNNW	L 9–13	47,434	
October 26	1:00 pm	California		Reser Stadium; Corvallis, OR		W 24–13	36,603	
November 2	1:00 pm	Arizona		Reser Stadium; Corvallis, OR		W 38–3	36,644	
November 9	12:30 pm	at Washington		Husky Stadium; Seattle, WA		L 29–41	72,557	
November 16	2:00 pm	at Stanford		Stanford Stadium; Stanford, CA		W 31–21	29,850	
November 23	12:30 pm	Oregon		Reser Stadium; Corvallis, OR (Civil War)	ABC	W 45–24	37,154	
December 26	5:30 pm	vs. Pittsburgh*		Bank One Ballpark; Phoenix, AZ (Insight Bowl)	ESPN	L 13–38	40,533	
*Non-conference game; Rankings from AP Poll released prior to the game; All times are in Pacific time

== Game summaries ==
=== Oregon ===
Team	1	2	3	4	Total
Oregon	3	14	0	7	24
• Oregon State	10	14	14	7	45

- Date: November 23
- Location: Reser Stadium, Corvallis, Oregon
- Game start: 12:30 p.m. PST

Scoring summary
1	Oregon State	Kirk Yliniemi 41-yard field goal	Oregon State 3-0
1	Oregon	Jared Siegel 22-yard field goal	Tie 3-3
1	Oregon State	Steven Jackson 16-yard run (Kirk Yliniemi kick)	Oregon State 10-3
2	Oregon State	Steven Jackson 69-yard pass from Derek Anderson (Kirk Yliniemi kick)	Oregon State 17-3
2	Oregon	Keenan Howry 83-yard pass from Jason Fife (Jared Siegel kick)	Oregon State 17-10
2	Oregon	Jason Fife 12-yard run (Jared Siegel kick)	Tie 17-17
2	Oregon State	Shawn Kintner 10-yard pass from Derek Anderson (Kirk Yliniemi kick)	Oregon State 24-17
3	Oregon State	Kenny Farley 17-yard pass from Derek Anderson (Kirk Yliniemi kick)	Oregon State 31-17
3	Oregon State	Steven Jackson 1-yard run (Kirk Yliniemi kick)	Oregon State 38-17
4	Oregon	Keenan Howry 63-yard punt return (Jared Siegel kick)	Oregon State 38-24
4	Oregon State	James Newson 40-yard pass from Derek Anderson (Kirk Yliniemi kick)	Oregon State 45-24

== Roster ==
2002 Oregon State Beavers football team roster
Players
Coaches
Offense

Pos.	#	Name	Class
WR	4	Deondre Alexander	Jr
QB	14	Derek Anderson	So
TE	84	Tim Euhus	Jr
RB	34	Steven Jackson	So

Defense

Pos.	#	Name	Class
LB	42	Nick Barnett	Sr
DT	98	Dwan Edwards	Jr
CB	8	Aric Williams	So

Special teams

Pos.	#	Name	Class

Head coach

- Dennis Erickson (4th year)

Coordinators/assistant coaches

- Tim Lappano (OC)
- Craig Bray (DC)

Legend

- (C) Team captain
- (S) Suspended
- (I) Ineligible
- Injured
- Redshirt

Roster
