= 2002 Stanford Cardinal football team =

American college football season

2002 Stanford Cardinal football
- Conference: Pacific-10 Conference
- Record: 2–9 (1–7 Pac-10)
- Head coach: Buddy Teevens (1st season)
- Offensive coordinator: Mike Sanford (1st season)
- Offensive scheme: Spread
- Defensive coordinator: Tom Williams (1st season)
- Base defense: 4–3
- Home stadium: Stanford Stadium

2002 Pacific-10 Conference football standings
	Conf.			Overall
Team	W		L	W		L
No. 10 Washington State $+	7	–	1	10	–	3
No. 4 USC %+	7	–	1	11	–	2
Arizona State	5	–	3	8	–	6
Oregon State	4	–	4	8	–	5
UCLA	4	–	4	8	–	5
California	4	–	4	7	–	5
Washington	4	–	4	7	–	6
Oregon	3	–	5	7	–	6
Arizona	1	–	7	4	–	8
Stanford	1	–	7	2	–	9
$ – BCS representative as conference champion; % – BCS at-large representative; + – Conference co-champions; Rankings from AP Poll

The 2002 Stanford Cardinal football team represented Stanford University in the 2002 NCAA Division I-A football season. In head coach Buddy Teevens's first season at Stanford, the Cardinal won only two games, ending the season with a 2–9 record, the school's worst since a 1–10 season in 1983.

The team played their home games at Stanford Stadium in Stanford, California and competed in the Pacific-10 Conference.

== Schedule ==
Date	Time	Opponent	Site	TV	Result	Attendance
September 7	12:30 p.m.	at Boston College*	Alumni Stadium; Chestnut Hill, MA	ESPN2	L 27–34	41,065
September 14	7:00 p.m.	San Jose State*	Stanford Stadium; Stanford, CA (rivalry)	KRON	W 63–26	54,500
September 28	12:30 p.m.	at Arizona State	Sun Devil Stadium; Tempe, AZ	ABC	L 24–65	51,443
October 5	10:30 a.m.	at No. 9 Notre Dame*	Notre Dame Stadium; Notre Dame, IN (Legends Trophy)	NBC	L 7–31	80,795
October 12	2:00 p.m.	No. 12 Washington State	Stanford Stadium; Stanford, CA		L 11–36	30,750
October 19	2:00 p.m.	Arizona^{†}	Stanford Stadium; Stanford, CA		W 16–6	33,800
October 26	3:30 p.m.	at UCLA	Rose Bowl; Pasadena, CA (rivalry)	FSN	L 18–28	54,116
November 2	12:30 p.m.	at No. 15 Oregon	Autzen Stadium; Eugene, OR (rivalry)		L 14–41	56,436
November 9	4:00 p.m.	No. 10 USC	Stanford Stadium; Stanford, CA (rivalry)	ABC	L 17–49	44,950
November 16	2:00 p.m.	Oregon State	Stanford Stadium; Stanford, CA		L 21–31	29,850
November 23	12:00 p.m.	at California	California Memorial Stadium; Berkeley, CA (105th Big Game)	KGO	L 7–30	71,224
*Non-conference game; ^{†}Homecoming; Rankings from AP Poll released prior to the game; All times are in Pacific time

== Roster ==
2002 Stanford Cardinal football team roster
Players
Coaches
Offense

Pos.	#	Name	Class
OT	67	Kirk Chambers	Jr
OL	70	Jeff Edwards	Fr
QB	12	Trent Edwards	Fr
QB	14	Ryan Eklund	So
RB	32	Justin Faust	Jr
OT	77	Kwame Harris	Jr
WR	5	Teyo Johnson	So
WR	83	Dan Knickerbocker	Fr

Defense

Pos.	#	Name	Class
NT	79	Craig Albrecht	Sr
LB	37	Jon Alston	Fr
CB	25	Calvin Armstrong	Fr
CB	9	Chilioke Asomugha	Sr
CB	21	Oshiomogho Atogwe	So

Special teams

Pos.	#	Name	Class

Head coach

- Buddy Teevens

Coordinators/assistant coaches

Legend

- (C) Team captain
- (S) Suspended
- (I) Ineligible
- Injured
- Redshirt

Roster

== Coaches ==
Name	Position	Year at Stanford	Alma mater (year)
Buddy Teevens	Head coach	1st	Dartmouth (1979)
Mark Banker	Co-defensive coordinator Secondary	1st	Springfield (1978)
David Kelly	Associate head coach Wide receivers	1st	Furman (1979)
Peter McCarty	Defensive ends	1st	Massachusetts (1978)
Steve Morton	Offensive line	1st	Washington State (1976)
Wayne Moses	Running backs	1st	Washington (1977)
Tom Quinn	Special teams coordinator Tight ends	1st	Arizona (1990)
Mike Sanford	Offensive coordinator Quarterbacks	1st	USC (1977)
Dave Tipton	Defensive line	14th	Stanford (1971)
Tom Williams	Co-defensive coordinator Linebackers	3rd	Stanford (1992)
Ron Forbes	Strength and conditioning	5th	Florida (1995)

== Game summaries ==
=== At Boston College ===
	1	2	3	4	Total
Cardinal	3	14	10	0	27
Eagles	0	17	0	17	34

=== San Jose State ===
	1	2	3	4	Total
Spartans	10	10	6	0	26
Cardinal	7	21	21	14	63

=== At Arizona State ===
	1	2	3	4	Total
Cardinal	13	3	8	0	24
Sun Devils	28	10	21	6	65

=== At Notre Dame ===
	1	2	3	4	Total
Cardinal	7	0	0	0	7
#9 Fighting Irish	0	3	21	7	31

=== Washington State ===
	1	2	3	4	Total
#12 Cougars	14	9	3	10	36
Cardinal	0	0	3	8	11

=== Arizona ===
	1	2	3	4	Total
Wildcats	3	3	0	0	6
Cardinal	10	0	3	3	16

=== At UCLA ===
	1	2	3	4	Total
Cardinal	15	3	0	0	18
Bruins	3	10	3	12	28

=== At Oregon ===
	1	2	3	4	Total
Cardinal	0	7	7	0	14
#15 Ducks	28	10	0	3	41

=== USC ===
	1	2	3	4	Total
#10 Trojans	14	7	14	14	49
Cardinal	7	3	0	7	17

=== Oregon State ===
	1	2	3	4	Total
Beavers	3	3	7	18	31
Cardinal	7	14	0	0	21

=== At California ===
	1	2	3	4	Total
Cardinal	7	0	0	0	7
Golden Bears	10	13	7	0	30
