= 2002 California Golden Bears football team =

American college football season

2002 California Golden Bears football
- Conference: Pacific-10
- Record: 7–5 (4–4 Pac-10)
- Head coach: Jeff Tedford (1st season)
- Offensive coordinator: George Cortez (1st season)
- Offensive scheme: Pro-style
- Defensive coordinator: Bob Gregory (1st season)
- Base defense: 4–3
- Home stadium: California Memorial Stadium

2002 Pacific-10 Conference football standings
	Conf.			Overall
Team	W		L	W		L
No. 10 Washington State $+	7	–	1	10	–	3
No. 4 USC %+	7	–	1	11	–	2
Arizona State	5	–	3	8	–	6
Oregon State	4	–	4	8	–	5
UCLA	4	–	4	8	–	5
California	4	–	4	7	–	5
Washington	4	–	4	7	–	6
Oregon	3	–	5	7	–	6
Arizona	1	–	7	4	–	8
Stanford	1	–	7	2	–	9
$ – BCS representative as conference champion; % – BCS at-large representative; + – Conference co-champions; Rankings from AP Poll

The 2002 California Golden Bears football team was an American football team that represented the University of California, Berkeley in the Pacific-10 Conference (Pac-10) during the 2002 NCAA Division I-A football season. In their first year under head coach Jeff Tedford, the Golden Bears compiled a 7–5 record (4–4 against Pac-10 opponents), finished in a tie for fourth place in the Pac-10, and outscored their opponents by a combined score of 427 to 318.

The team's statistical leaders included Kyle Boller with 2,815 passing yards, Joe Igber with 1,130 rushing yards, and Lashaun Ward with 709 receiving yards. Despite finishing the season with a 7–5 record, the Bears did not participate in a bowl game due to NCAA sanctions.

== Schedule ==
Date	Time	Opponent	Rank	Site	TV	Result	Attendance
August 31	12:30 p.m.	Baylor*		California Memorial Stadium; Berkeley, CA	KRON	W 70–22	27,185
September 7	3:30 p.m.	New Mexico State*		California Memorial Stadium; Berkeley, CA	KRON	W 34–13	24,692
September 14	9:00 a.m.	at No. 15 Michigan State*		Spartan Stadium; East Lansing, MI	ESPN2	W 46–22	72,634
September 21	2:00 p.m.	Air Force*	No. 23	California Memorial Stadium; Berkeley, CA		L 21–23	31,816
September 28	2:00 p.m.	No. 16 Washington State		California Memorial Stadium; Berkeley, CA		L 38–48	29,297
October 5	12:30 p.m.	at No. 12 Washington		Husky Stadium; Seattle, WA		W 34–27	71,337
October 12	3:30 p.m.	at No. 20 USC		Los Angeles Memorial Coliseum; Los Angeles, CA	FSN	L 28–30	63,113
October 19	4:00 p.m.	UCLA^{†}		California Memorial Stadium; Berkeley, CA (rivalry)	TBS	W 17–12	46,697
October 26	1:00 p.m.	at Oregon State		Reser Stadium; Corvallis, OR		L 13–24	36,603
November 9	3:30 p.m.	at No. 25 Arizona State		Sun Devil Stadium; Tempe, AZ	FSN	W 55–38	40,769
November 16	12:30 p.m.	Arizona		California Memorial Stadium; Berkeley, CA		L 41–52	28,808
November 23	12:30 p.m.	Stanford		California Memorial Stadium; Berkeley, CA (Big Game)		W 30–7	71,224
*Non-conference game; ^{†}Homecoming; Rankings from AP Poll released prior to the game

== Game summaries ==
=== Baylor ===
Team	1	2	3	4	Total
Baylor	7	0	8	7	22
• California	35	14	0	21	70

- Date: August 31
- Location: California Memorial Stadium, Berkeley, CA
- Game start: 12:30 p.m. PDT
- Elapsed time: 3:33
- Game attendance: 27,185
- Game weather: Sunny; 72 °F (22 °C); wind 3–5 mph (4.8–8.0 km/h) W
- Referee: Jim Fogltance
- Television network: KRON

Scoring summary
Q1	14:40	CAL	Gray 71 yard pass from Williams (Jensen kick)	CAL 7–0
Q1	12:58	CAL	McArthur 4 yard pass from Boller (Jensen kick)	CAL 14–0
Q1	8:19	CAL	Igber 8 yard pass from Boller (Jensen kick)	CAL 21–0
Q1	1:49	CAL	Nixon 100 yard interception return (Jensen kick)	CAL 28–0
Q1	:57	CAL	Powell 26 yard interception return (Jensen kick)	CAL 35–0
Q1	:00	BAY	Newhouse 85 yard pass from Karas (Andino kick)	CAL 35–7
Q2	10:41	CAL	Manderino 18 yard pass from Boller (Jensen kick)	CAL 42–7
Q2	1:16	CAL	McArthur 5 yard run (Jensen kick)	CAL 49–7
Q3	:31	BAY	Golden 1 yard run (Ricks run)	CAL 49–15
Q4	12:12	CAL	Boller 3 yard run (Jensen kick)	CAL 56–14
Q4	10:06	CAL	Ward 52 yard pass from Robertson (Jensen kick)	CAL 63–14
Q4	4:16	CAL	O'Keith 2 yard run (Jensen kick)	CAL 70–15
Q4	1:31	BAY	Armstrong 6 yard run (Andino kick)	CAL 70–22

== Roster ==
2002 California Golden Bears football team roster
Players
Coaches
Offense

Pos.	#	Name	Class
QB	7	Kyle Boller	Sr
QB	13	Zac Wasserman	So
RB	18	Adimchinobe Echemandu	Jr
OL	63	Mark Wilson	Jr
G	64	Scott Tercero	Sr

Defense

Pos.	#	Name	Class
CB	1	Jemeel Powell	Sr
S	2	Nnamdi Asomugha	Sr
LB	48	Tully Banta-Cain	Sr

Special teams

Pos.	#	Name	Class

Head coach

- Jeff Tedford

Coordinators/assistant coaches

Legend

- (C) Team captain
- (S) Suspended
- (I) Ineligible
- Injured
- Redshirt

Roster
