= 2002 Holiday Bowl =

2002 Pacific Life Holiday Bowl
| Kansas State Wildcats | Arizona State Sun Devils |
| (10–2) | (8–5) |
| Big 12 | Pac-10 |
| 34 | 27 |
| Head coach: Bill Snyder | Head coach: Dirk Koetter |
| AP / Coaches / BCS; 6 / 6 / 8 |
| | 1 | 2 | 3 | 4 | Total |
|---|---|---|---|---|---|
| Kansas State | 0 | 14 | 0 | 20 | 34 |
| Arizona State | 0 | 20 | 0 | 7 | 27 |
- Date: December 27, 2002
- Season: 2002
- Stadium: Qualcomm Stadium
- Location: San Diego, California
- MVP: Offensive: Ell Roberson, Kansas State and Defensive: Terrell Suggs, Arizona State
- Favorite: Kansas State by 17.5
- Referee: Bill LeMonnier (Big Ten)
- Halftime show: Marching bands
- Attendance: 58,717
- Payout: US$2,035,788 per team

United States TV coverage
- Network: ESPN
- Announcers: Mike Tirico (Play by Play); Kirk Herbstreit (Analyst); Lee Corso (Analyst); Dr. Jerry Punch (Sideline)
- Nielsen ratings: 4.2

The 2002 Holiday Bowl was a college football bowl game played December 27, 2002 in San Diego, California. It was part of the 2002 NCAA Division I-A football season. It featured the Arizona State Sun Devils against the Kansas State Wildcats. Kansas State won the game by a 34–27 final score.

After a scoreless first quarter, Arizona State scored first following a 6-yard touchdown pass from quarterback Andrew Walter to wide receiver Justin Taplin for an early 7–0 lead. Arizona State added to the lead when Matt Barth drilled a 26-yard field goal to put Arizona State up 10–0. Kansas State finally got on the board when running back Darren Sproles rushed 41 yards for a touchdown making it 10–7. Running back Hakim Hill answered for ASU by rushing 9 yards for a touchdown, making it 17–7. Matt Barth later connected on a 39-yard field goal, increasing ASU's lead to 20–7. Before halftime, quarterback Ell Roberson rushed 32 yards for a touchdown, pulling Kansas State to within 20–14.

The defenses held in the third quarter, and the score remained 20–14 heading into the fourth quarter. Kansas State's Ell Roberson scored on a 3-yard touchdown run, but a missed PAT left the score tied at 20. Andrew Walter threw a 10-yard touchdown pass to wide receiver Mike Williams to give Arizona State a 27–20 fourth quarter lead. Ell Roberson scored the tying touchdown on a 1-yard quarterback sneak with just 7 minutes left in the game. With only 75 seconds left in the game, Roberson threw a 10-yard touchdown pass to Derrick Evans for the winning score.
