= Dirk Koetter =

American football coach (born 1959)

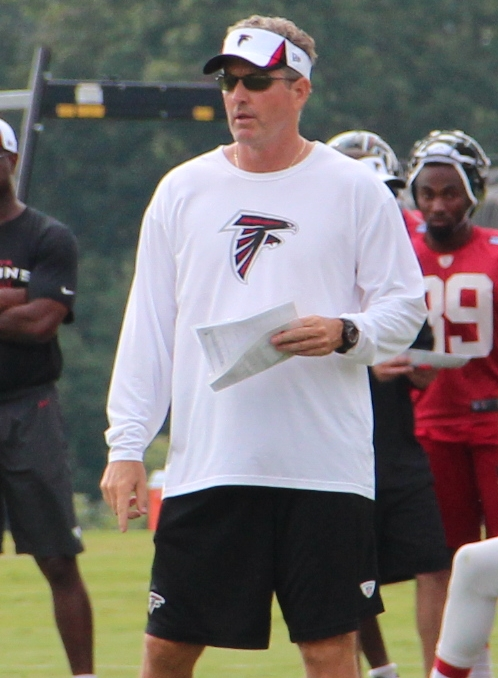
- Koetter with the Atlanta Falcons in 2013

Current position
- Title: Senior analyst
- Team: Boise State
- Conference: MW

Biographical details
- Born: February 5, 1959 (age 67); Pocatello, Idaho, U.S.

Playing career
- 1977–1981: Idaho State
- Position: Quarterback

Coaching career (HC unless noted)
- 1983–1984: Highland HS (ID)
- 1985: San Francisco State (OC)
- 1986–1988: UTEP (OC)
- 1989–1993: Missouri (OC)
- 1994–1995: Boston College (OC)
- 1996–1997: Oregon (OC)
- 1998–2000: Boise State
- 2001–2006: Arizona State
- 2007–2011: Jacksonville Jaguars (OC)
- 2012–2014: Atlanta Falcons (OC)
- 2015: Tampa Bay Buccaneers (OC)
- 2016–2018: Tampa Bay Buccaneers
- 2019–2020: Atlanta Falcons (OC)
- 2022: Boise State (offensive analyst)
- 2022: Boise State (interim OC)
- 2024: Boise State (OC/QB)
- 2025–present: Boise State (senior analyst)

Head coaching record
- Overall: 19–29 (NFL); 66–44 (college)
- Bowls: 4–2

Accomplishments and honors

Championships
- 2 Big West (1999–2000)

Dirk Jeffrey Koetter (/ˈkʌtər/ KUT-ər; born February 5, 1959) is an American former college and professional football coach. He recently served as the offensive coordinator and quarterbacks coach at Boise State. Koetter was the head coach of the Tampa Bay Buccaneers of the National Football League (NFL) from 2016 to 2018 and was the head coach at Boise State from 1998 to 2000 and at Arizona State University from 2001 to 2006, compiling a career college football head coaching record of 66–44 (.600). He also served as the offensive coordinator for the Jacksonville Jaguars, Atlanta Falcons, and Buccaneers.

== Early life ==
Born and raised in Pocatello, Idaho, Koetter is the son of Jim Koetter, who was also a football coach. A quarterback, he graduated from Highland High School in 1977 and stayed in town to play college football at Idaho State University under new head coach Bud Hake.

As a fifth-year senior in 1981, Koetter backed up Mike Machurek at quarterback; the Bengals went 12–1 and won the national championship in Division I-AA under second-year head coach Dave Kragthorpe. Koetter earned a bachelor's degree at ISU in 1981 and a master's in athletic administration the following year.

== Coaching career ==
=== High school and college coaching ===
Koetter was the head coach at Highland High School for two seasons (1983–84) before becoming a full-time college assistant coach in 1985 as the offensive coordinator at San Francisco State University. After his time at San Francisco State, Koetter coached at UTEP (1986–88), Missouri (1989–93), Boston College (1994–95), and Oregon (1996–97).

Koetter was the head coach for three seasons at Boise State from 1998 through 2000, then moved to Arizona State in 2001. His record with the Broncos was 26–10 (.722), with two Big West Conference titles and two bowl victories and was named Big West Coach of the Year twice. At Arizona State, Koetter compiled a 40–34 (.541) record, and four Bowl appearances in six years. Under Koetter, who was also the offensive play caller, the Sun Devils became known for a vertical passing attack. On November 26, 2006, The Arizona Republic reported that Koetter was being terminated as Arizona State football coach. His final game was the 2006 Hawaii Bowl on Christmas Eve, a 41–24 loss.

=== Jacksonville Jaguars ===
In 2007, Koetter accepted the position of offensive coordinator for the Jacksonville Jaguars of the National Football League (NFL). During his first year in the NFL, Koetter had immediate success, setting Jaguars franchise records for total points scored and yards gained while helping the Jaguars to an 11–5 record. In his five seasons with the Jaguars, the team cumulatively ranked third in the NFL in rushing yards over that time span in addition to having the NFL's leading rusher in Maurice Jones-Drew in 2010.

=== Atlanta Falcons ===
On January 15, 2012, Koetter was hired as the offensive coordinator for the Atlanta Falcons. On January 2, 2013, the team signed him to a contract extension that ran through the 2014 season after they finished the 2012 season with a league-best 13–3 record and the #1-seed in the NFC. The Falcons appeared in the NFC Championship Game at the end of the season but lost 28–24 to the San Francisco 49ers, who had made their first Super Bowl in 18 years, despite a 17–0 second quarter lead.

=== Tampa Bay Buccaneers ===
On January 8, 2015, Koetter was hired by the Falcons' division rival, the Tampa Bay Buccaneers, to become their offensive coordinator.

On January 15, 2016, Koetter was promoted to head coach after the Buccaneers fired head coach Lovie Smith. After posting a 9–7 record in 2016 and barely missing the playoffs, the team had high expectations for the 2017 season. However, the Buccaneers failed to meet those expectations, slipping to a 5–11 record. On December 29, 2017, the team announced that Koetter would be retained for the 2018 season despite regressing in his second year as head coach. After another 5–11 season in 2018, Koetter was fired on December 30, 2018. He finished his tenure in Tampa Bay with a 19–29 (.396) record.

=== Atlanta Falcons (second stint) ===
On January 8, 2019, Koetter was re-hired as the offensive coordinator for the Falcons. After not being retained under new head coach Arthur Smith following the 2020 season, Koetter announced his retirement from coaching on January 22, 2021.

=== Boise State ===
On June 15, 2022, Koetter returned to Boise State as an offensive analyst. On September 24, head coach Andy Avalos fired offensive coordinator Tim Plough and named Koetter the interim offensive coordinator for the rest of the season.

On January 2, 2025, Koetter announced his retirement from coaching.

== Head coaching record ==
=== College ===
| Year | Team | Overall | Conference | Standing | Bowl/playoffs | Coaches^{#} | AP^{°} |
|---|---|---|---|---|---|---|---|
Boise State Broncos (Big West Conference) (1998–2000)
| 1998 | Boise State | 6–5 | 2–3 | 4th | | | |
| 1999 | Boise State | 10–3 | 5–1 | 1st | W Humanitarian | | |
| 2000 | Boise State | 10–2 | 5–0 | 1st | W Humanitarian | | |
| Boise State: | | 26–10 | 12–4 | | | | |
Arizona State Sun Devils (Pacific-10 Conference) (2001–2006)
| 2001 | Arizona State | 4–7 | 1–7 | 9th | | | |
| 2002 | Arizona State | 8–6 | 5–3 | 3rd | L Holiday | | |
| 2003 | Arizona State | 5–7 | 2–6 | T–8th | | | |
| 2004 | Arizona State | 9–3 | 5–3 | T–3rd | W Sun | 20 | 19 |
| 2005 | Arizona State | 7–5 | 4–4 | 4th | W Insight | | |
| 2006 | Arizona State | 7–6 | 4–5 | T–5th | L Hawaii | | |
| Arizona State: | | 40–34 | 21–28 | | | | |
| Total: | | 66–44 | | | | | |
^{#}Rankings from final Coaches Poll.; ^{°}Rankings from final AP Poll.

=== NFL ===
| Team | Year | Regular season | | | | | Postseason | | | |
| Team | Year | Won | Lost | Ties | Win % | Finish | Won | Lost | Win % | Result |
|---|---|---|---|---|---|---|---|---|---|---|
| TB | 2016 | 9 | 7 | 0 | .563 | 2nd in NFC South | – | – | – | – |
| TB | 2017 | 5 | 11 | 0 | .313 | 4th in NFC South | – | – | – | – |
| TB | 2018 | 5 | 11 | 0 | .313 | 4th in NFC South | – | – | – | – |
| Total | | 19 | 29 | 0 | .396 | | 0 | 0 | – | |

== Personal life ==
Koetter married his wife, Kim, in 1988. They have four children: Kaylee, Kendra, Derek, and Davis.
