= 2002 Arizona State Sun Devils football team =

American college football season

2002 Arizona State Sun Devils football

Holiday Bowl, L 27–34 vs. Kansas State
- Conference: Pacific-10 Conference
- Record: 8–6 (5–3 Pac-10)
- Head coach: Dirk Koetter (2nd season)
- Defensive coordinator: Brent Guy (2nd season)
- Captains: Andrew Walter; Terrell Suggs
- Home stadium: Sun Devil Stadium

2002 Pacific-10 Conference football standings
	Conf.			Overall
Team	W		L	W		L
No. 10 Washington State $+	7	–	1	10	–	3
No. 4 USC %+	7	–	1	11	–	2
Arizona State	5	–	3	8	–	6
Oregon State	4	–	4	8	–	5
UCLA	4	–	4	8	–	5
California	4	–	4	7	–	5
Washington	4	–	4	7	–	6
Oregon	3	–	5	7	–	6
Arizona	1	–	7	4	–	8
Stanford	1	–	7	2	–	9
$ – BCS representative as conference champion; % – BCS at-large representative; + – Conference co-champions; Rankings from AP Poll

The 2002 Arizona State Sun Devils football team represented Arizona State University as a member of the Pacific-10 Conference (Pac-10) during the 2002 NCAA Division I-A football season. Led by second-year head coach Dirk Koetter, the Sun Devils compiled an overall record of 8–6 with a mark of 5–3 in conference play, placing third in the Pac-10. Arizona State was invited to the Holiday Bowl, where the Sun Devils lost to Kansas State. The team played home games at Sun Devil Stadium in Tempe, Arizona.

== Schedule ==
Date	Time	Opponent	Rank	Site	TV	Result	Attendance	Source
August 24	4:45 pm	at No. 10 Nebraska*		Memorial Stadium; Lincoln, NE (BCA Classic)	ESPN	L 10–48	77,779	
August 31	7:00 pm	Eastern Washington*		Sun Devil Stadium; Tempe, AZ		W 38–2	39,581	
September 7	7:00 pm	UCF*		Sun Devil Stadium; Tempe, AZ	AZTV	W 46–13	43,401	
September 14	7:00 pm	at San Diego State*		Qualcomm Stadium; San Diego, CA	AZTV	W 39–28	29,041	
September 28	12:30 pm	Stanford		Sun Devil Stadium; Tempe, AZ	ABC	W 65–24	51,443	
October 5	7:00 pm	North Carolina*		Sun Devil Stadium; Tempe, AZ		L 35–38	42,128	
October 12	7:00 pm	Oregon State		Sun Devil Stadium; Tempe, AZ	FSNAZ	W 13–9	47,434	
October 19	12:30 pm	at No. 6 Oregon		Autzen Stadium; Eugene, OR		W 45–42	56,432	
October 26	7:00 pm	Washington^{†}	No. 23	Sun Devil Stadium; Tempe, AZ		W 27–16	56,101	
November 2	12:30 pm	at No. 8 Washington State	No. 16	Martin Stadium; Pullman, WA	ABC	L 22–44	37,444	
November 9	4:30 pm	California	No. 25	Sun Devil Stadium; Tempe, AZ	FSN	L 38–55	40,769	
November 16	5:00 pm	at No. 8 USC		Los Angeles Memorial Coliseum; Los Angeles, CA	TBS	L 13–34	73,923	
November 29	1:00 pm	at Arizona		Arizona Stadium; Tucson, AZ (rivalry)	FSN	W 34–20	47,005	
December 27	6:00 pm	vs. No. 6 Kansas State*		Qualcomm Stadium; San Diego, CA (Holiday Bowl)	ESPN	L 27–34	58,717	
*Non-conference game; ^{†}Homecoming; Rankings from AP Poll released prior to the game; All times are in Mountain time

== Roster ==
2002 Arizona State Sun Devils football team roster
Players
Coaches
Offense

Pos.	#	Name	Class
C	53	Drew Hodgdon	So
FB	44	Mike Karney	Jr
WR	81	Shaun McDonald	Sr
QB	16	Andrew Walter	So

Defense

Pos.	#	Name	Class
LB	1	Solomon Bates	Sr
DT	95	Khon Nguyen	Sr
DE	48	Terrell Suggs	Jr
LB	52	Mason Unck	Sr

Special teams

Pos.	#	Name	Class

Head coach

- Dirk Koetter

Coordinators/assistant coaches

Legend

- (C) Team captain
- (S) Suspended
- (I) Ineligible
- Injured
- Redshirt
