= 2002 UCLA Bruins football team =

American college football season

2002 UCLA Bruins football

Las Vegas Bowl champion

Las Vegas Bowl, W 27–13 vs. New Mexico
- Conference: Pacific-10 Conference
- Record: 8–5 (4–4 Pac-10)
- Head coach: Bob Toledo (7th season; regular season); Ed Kezirian (interim; bowl game)
- Offensive coordinator: Kelly Skipper (2nd season)
- Offensive scheme: Pro-style
- Defensive coordinator: Phil Snow (2nd season)
- Base defense: 4–3
- Home stadium: Rose Bowl

2002 Pacific-10 Conference football standings
	Conf.			Overall
Team	W		L	W		L
No. 10 Washington State $+	7	–	1	10	–	3
No. 4 USC %+	7	–	1	11	–	2
Arizona State	5	–	3	8	–	6
Oregon State	4	–	4	8	–	5
UCLA	4	–	4	8	–	5
California	4	–	4	7	–	5
Washington	4	–	4	7	–	6
Oregon	3	–	5	7	–	6
Arizona	1	–	7	4	–	8
Stanford	1	–	7	2	–	9
$ – BCS representative as conference champion; % – BCS at-large representative; + – Conference co-champions; Rankings from AP Poll

The 2002 UCLA Bruins football team represented the University of California, Los Angeles in the 2002 NCAA Division I-A football season. They played their home games at the Rose Bowl in Pasadena, California and were led by head coach Bob Toledo, who was fired at the end of the regular season.

== Schedule ==
Date	Time	Opponent	Rank	Site	TV	Result	Attendance
September 7	7:15 pm	No. 19 Colorado State*		Rose Bowl; Pasadena, CA	FSN	W 30–19	58,078
September 14	4:00 pm	at Oklahoma State*	No. 23	Lewis Field; Stillwater, OK	FSN	W 38–24	43,020
September 21	12:30 pm	Colorado*	No. 20	Rose Bowl; Pasadena, CA	ABC	L 17–31	63,880
September 28	11:00 am	at San Diego State*		Qualcomm Stadium; San Diego, CA	ESPN2	W 43–7	33,610
October 5	12:30 pm	at Oregon State		Reser Stadium; Corvallis, OR	ABC	W 43–35	36,529
October 12	12:30 pm	No. 7 Oregon		Rose Bowl; Pasadena, CA	ABC	L 30–31	68,882
October 19	4:00 pm	at California		California Memorial Stadium; Berkeley, CA (rivalry)	TBS	L 12–17	46,697
October 26	3:30 pm	Stanford^{†}		Rose Bowl; Pasadena, CA (rivalry)	FSN	W 28–18	54,116
November 2	4:00 pm	at Washington		Husky Stadium; Seattle, WA	TBS	W 34–24	72,017
November 9	6:00 pm	at Arizona		Arizona Stadium; Tucson, AZ	FSNW2	W 37–7	43,613
November 23	12:30 pm	No. 7 USC	No. 25	Rose Bowl; Pasadena, CA (Victory Bell)	ABC	L 21–52	91,084
December 7	1:30 pm	No. 7 Washington State		Rose Bowl; Pasadena, CA	ABC	L 27–48	56,335
December 25	1:30 pm	vs. New Mexico*		Sam Boyd Stadium; Whitney, NV (Las Vegas Bowl)	ESPN	W 27–13	30,324
*Non-conference game; ^{†}Homecoming; Rankings from AP; All times are in Pacific time

== Roster ==
2002 UCLA Bruins football team roster
Players
Coaches
Offense

Pos.	#	Name	Class
WR	87	Craig Bragg	So
TE	89	Keith Carter	Fr
TE	19	Marcedes Lewis	Fr
QB	10	Cory Paus	Sr
WR	1	Tab Perry	So
TE	18	Mike Seidman	Sr

Defense

Pos.	#	Name	Class
DE	43	Dave Ball	Jr
DE	49	Mat Ball	Jr
DE	75	Ryan Boschetti	Jr
CB	15	Marcus Cassel	Fr
LB	11	Brandon Chillar	Jr
DB	24	Ben Emanuel	So
DT	77	Rodney Leisle	Jr
CB	9	Ricky Manning	Sr
LB	44	Marcus Reese	Sr
DB	17	Matthew Ware	So

Special teams

Pos.	#	Name	Class
P	39	Chris Kluwe	So

Head coach

- Bob Toledo

Coordinators/assistant coaches

Legend

- (C) Team captain
- (S) Suspended
- (I) Ineligible
- Injured
- Redshirt

Roster

== Team players in the NFL ==
Player	Position	Round	Pick	NFL club
Mike Seidman	Tight end	3	76	Carolina Panthers
Ricky Manning	Cornerback	3	82	Carolina Panthers
