= 2002 Washington State Cougars football team =

American college football season

2002 Washington State Cougars football
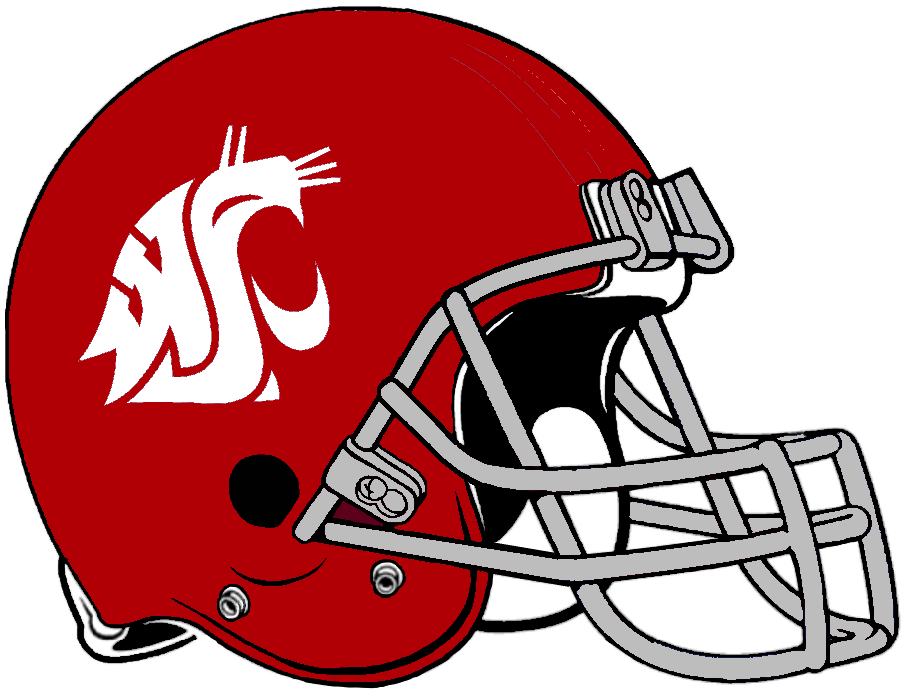

Pac-10 co-champion

Rose Bowl, L 14–34 vs. Oklahoma
- Conference: Pacific-10 Conference

Ranking
- Coaches: No. 10
- AP: No. 10
- Record: 10–3 (7–1 Pac-10)
- Head coach: Mike Price (14th season)
- Offensive coordinator: Mike Levenseller (2nd season)
- Offensive scheme: Spread
- Defensive coordinator: Bill Doba (9th season)
- Base defense: 4–3
- Captains: Jason Gesser; Curtis Nettles; Marcus Trufant
- Home stadium: Martin Stadium

2002 Pacific-10 Conference football standings
	Conf.			Overall
Team	W		L	W		L
No. 10 Washington State $+	7	–	1	10	–	3
No. 4 USC %+	7	–	1	11	–	2
Arizona State	5	–	3	8	–	6
Oregon State	4	–	4	8	–	5
UCLA	4	–	4	8	–	5
California	4	–	4	7	–	5
Washington	4	–	4	7	–	6
Oregon	3	–	5	7	–	6
Arizona	1	–	7	4	–	8
Stanford	1	–	7	2	–	9
$ – BCS representative as conference champion; % – BCS at-large representative; + – Conference co-champions; Rankings from AP Poll

The 2002 Washington State Cougars football team represented Washington State University as a member of Pacific-10 Conference the 2002 NCAA Division I-A football season. The team was led by Mike Price in his 14th and final season as head coach, and played its home games on campus at Martin Stadium in Pullman, Washington.

Washington State finished the regular season with an overall record of 10–2 and mark of 7–1 in the conference play, sharing the Pac-10 title with USC. They defeated the Trojans in overtime in early October, but lost to unranked Washington in triple overtime in the Apple Cup at Pullman; WSU regrouped and beat UCLA by three touchdowns two weeks later. The seventh-ranked Cougars were invited to the Rose Bowl on New Year's Day, but were soundly defeated by the Oklahoma Sooners, and dropped to tenth in the final rankings.

The Rose Bowl was the final game for Price at Washington State. He left to become the head football coach at the University of Alabama, but never coached a game for the Crimson Tide. Bill Doba, longtime defensive coordinator for the cougars, was promoted to head coach for the 2003 season, and he led the Cougar program through 2007.

== Schedule ==
Date	Time	Opponent	Rank	Site	TV	Result	Attendance	Source
August 31	12:00 pm	vs. Nevada*	No. 12	Seahawks Stadium; Seattle, WA (Cougar Gridiron Classic)		W 31–7	63,588	
September 7	3:00 pm	Idaho*	No. 11	Martin Stadium; Pullman, WA (Battle of the Palouse)		W 49–14	30,110	
September 14	12:30 pm	at No. 6 Ohio State*	No. 10	Ohio Stadium; Columbus, OH (College GameDay)	ABC	L 7–25	104,553	
September 21	2:00 pm	Montana State*	No. 16	Martin Stadium; Pullman, WA		W 45–28	23,713	
September 28	2:00 pm	at California	No. 16	California Memorial Stadium; Berkeley, CA		W 48–38	29,297	
October 5	4:00 pm	No. 18 USC^{†}	No. 17	Martin Stadium; Pullman, WA	TBS	W 30–27 ^{OT}	36,861	
October 12	2:00 pm	at Stanford	No. 12	Stanford Stadium; Stanford, CA		W 36–11	30,750	
October 26	7:00 pm	at Arizona	No. 9	Arizona Stadium; Tucson, AZ	FSN	W 21–13	46,462	
November 2	12:30 pm	No. 16 Arizona State	No. 8	Martin Stadium; Pullman, WA	ABC	W 44–22	37,444	
November 9	12:30 pm	No. 15 Oregon	No. 5	Martin Stadium; Pullman, WA	ABC	W 32–21	37,600	
November 23	3:30 pm	Washington	No. 3	Martin Stadium; Pullman, WA (Apple Cup)	FSN	L 26–29 ^{3OT}	37,600	
December 7	1:30 pm	at UCLA	No. 7	Rose Bowl; Pasadena, CA	ABC	W 48–27	56,335	
January 1, 2003	2:00 pm	vs. No. 8 Oklahoma*	No. 7	Rose Bowl; Pasadena, CA (Rose Bowl)	ABC	L 14–34	86,848	
*Non-conference game; ^{†}Homecoming; Rankings from AP Poll released prior to the game; All times are in Pacific time

== Game summaries ==
=== USC ===
#20 USC at #17 Washington State

Team	1	2	3	4	OT	Total
USC	7	0	7	13	0	27
• Washington St	10	0	7	10	3	30

- Date: October 5
- Location: Martin Stadium • Pullman, Washington
- Television network: TBS

Scoring summary
1		USC	Sultan McCullough 6 yard run (Ryan Killeen kick)	USC 7-0
1		WSU	Drew Dunning 48 yard field goal	USC 7-3
1		WSU	Mike Bush 3 yard pass from Jason Gesser (Drew Dunning kick)	Wash St 10-7
3		USC	Malaefou MacKenzie 15 yard pass from Carson Palmer (Ryan Killeen kick)	USC 14-10
3		WSU	Jermaine Green 75 yard run (Drew Dunning kick)	Wash St 17-14
4	10:03	WSU	Devard Darling 2 yard pass from Jason Gesser (Drew Dunning kick)	Wash St 24-14
4		USC	Carson Palmer 3 yard run (Ryan Killeen kick)	Wash St 24-21
4	4:10	USC	Mike Williams 55 yard pass from Carson Palmer (kick failed)	USC 27-24
4	1:50	WSU	Drew Dunning 35 yard field goal	Tie 27-27
OT		WSU	Drew Dunning 35 yard field goal	Wash St 30-27

Washington State's first win over USC in Pullman in sixteen years.

== Personnel ==
=== Coaching staff ===
- Head coach: Mike Price
- Assistants: Robb Akey, Chris Ball, Bob Connelly, Bill Doba, Kasey Dunn, Mike Levenseller, Robin Pflugrad, Aaron Price, Mike Walker

}

=== Roster ===
2002 Washington State Cougars football team roster
Players
Coaches
Offense

Pos.	#	Name	Class
OT	67	Calvin Armstrong	So
TE	81	Troy Bienemann	Fr
WR	5	Mike Bush	Sr
WR	1	Devard Darling	So
QB	17	Jason Gesser (C)	Sr
RB	30	Jermaine Green	Jr
C	52	Tyler Hunt	Sr
QB	4	Matt Kegel	Jr
G	71	Billy Knotts	Jr
OT	50	Josh Parrish	Jr
WR	84	Jerome Riley	Sr
G	77	Derrick Roche	Sr
QB	9	Josh Swogger	Fr
RB	25	John Tippins	Sr

Defense

Pos.	#	Name	Class
DB	28	Hamza Abdullah	So
LB	46	Pat Bennett	So
DE	9	Isaac Brown	Jr
FS	27	Erik Coleman	Jr
CB	29	Jason David	Jr
LB	58	Mawull Davis	Sr
LB	51	Will Derting	Fr
LB	48	Al Genatone	Jr
DT	88	Rien Long	Jr
CB	15	Karl Paymah	So
DE	6	Fred Shavles	Sr
CB	45	Marcus Trufant (C)	Sr
DT	95	Jeremey Williams	Jr
SS	24	Virgil Williams	Jr

Special teams

Pos.	#	Name	Class
P	8	Kyle Basler	Fr
K	10	Drew Dunning	Jr

Head coach

- Mike Price (14th year)

Coordinators/assistant coaches

- Mike Levenseller – (OC)
- Bill Doba – (DC)
- Chris Ball – (DB)

Legend

- (C) Team captain
- (S) Suspended
- (I) Ineligible
- Injured
- Redshirt

Roster

== 2002 Cougars in professional football ==
- Hamza Abdullah
- Calvin Armstrong
- Erik Coleman
- Devard Darling
- Jason David
- Rien Long
- Karl Paymah
- Marcus Trufant
