= Kyle Boller =

American football player (born 1981)

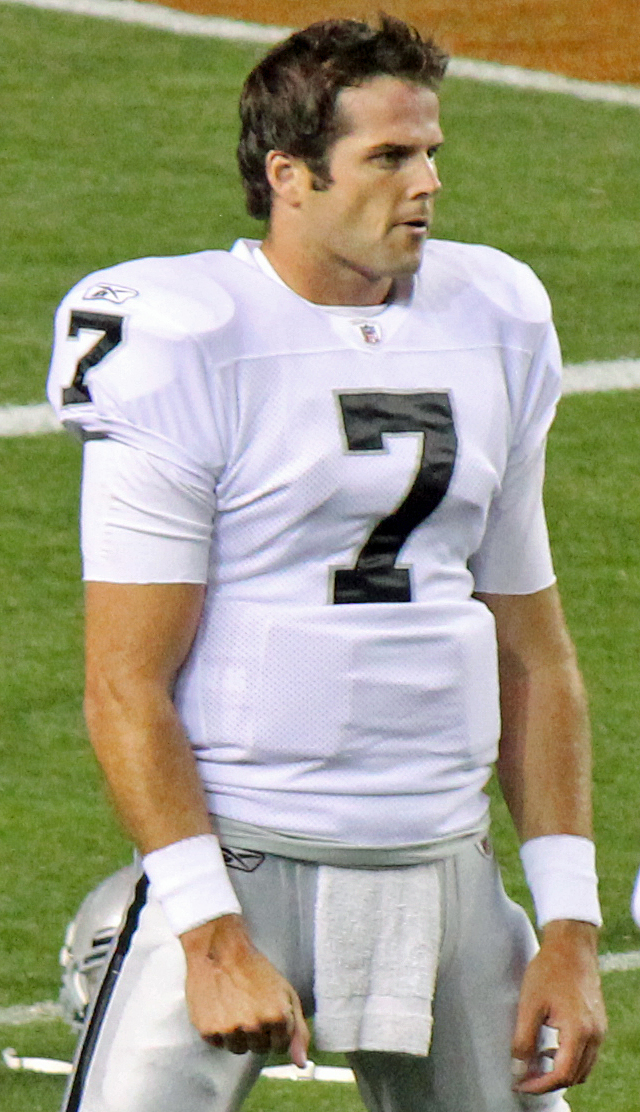
- Boller with the Oakland Raiders in 2010

No. 8, 7, 12
- Position: Quarterback

Personal information
- Born: June 17, 1981 (age 45); Burbank, California, U.S.
- Listed height: 6 ft 3 in (1.91 m)
- Listed weight: 220 lb (100 kg)

Career information
- High school: Hart (Santa Clarita, California)
- College: California (1999–2002)
- NFL draft: 2003: 1st round, 19th overall pick

Career history
- Baltimore Ravens (2003–2008); St. Louis Rams (2009); Oakland Raiders (2010–2011); San Diego Chargers (2012)*
- * Offseason or practice squad member only

Awards and highlights
- Second-team All-Pac-10 (2002)

Career NFL statistics
- Passing attempts: 1,519
- Passing completions: 861
- Completion percentage: 56.7%
- TD–INT: 48–54
- Passing yards: 8,931
- Passer rating: 69.5
- Stats at Pro Football Reference

Kyle Bryan Boller (born June 17, 1981) is an American former professional football player who was a quarterback in the National Football League (NFL). After playing college football for the California Golden Bears, he was selected by the Baltimore Ravens in the first round of the 2003 NFL draft. He was a member of the Ravens from 2003 to 2008, the St. Louis Rams in 2009, and the Oakland Raiders from 2010 to 2011.

== Early life ==
Boller was born in Burbank, California. He earned the 1998 California State Player of the Year honors after an outstanding senior season at William S. Hart High School in Santa Clarita, CA. He led Hart to the CIF Southern Section Division III title with a 13–1 record. He passed for California prep record of 4,838 yards and threw for 59 touchdowns, the 2nd-best mark in California prep history, and ended the season completing 290 of 454 passes (63.9%). Because of this, he was considered by many to be the best prospect to emerge from The Valley Region of Los Angeles since John Elway came out of Granada Hills High School in 1979. During the 1998 season, Boller also played the position of safety on defense, and intercepted a pass in the final minute of the sectional championship game. He was rated the number one quarterback prospect in the nation by PrepStar and was that publication's national Offensive Co-Player of the Year.

== College career ==
In college, Boller was a starter for three and a half seasons at the University of California, Berkeley, and graduated with several Golden Bears' career and single season records. He is currently No. 3 for all-time career passing yards, No. 3 in total offense and No. 2 for all time touchdown passes.

== Professional career ==
Pre-draft measurables
Height	Weight	Arm length	Hand span	40-yard dash	10-yard split	20-yard split	20-yard shuttle	Three-cone drill	Vertical jump	Broad jump
6 ft 3 in (1.91 m)	234 lb (106 kg)	32 5/8 in (0.83 m)	9 3/4 in (0.25 m)	4.61 s	1.60 s	2.69 s	4.02 s	7.20 s	35.5 in (0.90 m)	9 ft 9 in (2.97 m)
All values from NFL Combine

=== Baltimore Ravens ===
Boller became the Ravens' first round draft pick in 2003 NFL draft (19th overall pick). He was the second quarterback selected from the Pac-10 conference after the Cincinnati Bengals selected Carson Palmer from USC with the first overall pick. He started the first 9 games of the season, going 5–3, before being injured (thigh) in a game against the St. Louis Rams. He was inactive for most of the rest of the season, being replaced by backup Anthony Wright, as he also had to have surgery to repair a muscle in his quadriceps. Boller rushed 30 times for 62 yards, and completed 116 of 224 passes for 1,260 yards with 7 touchdowns and 9 interceptions.

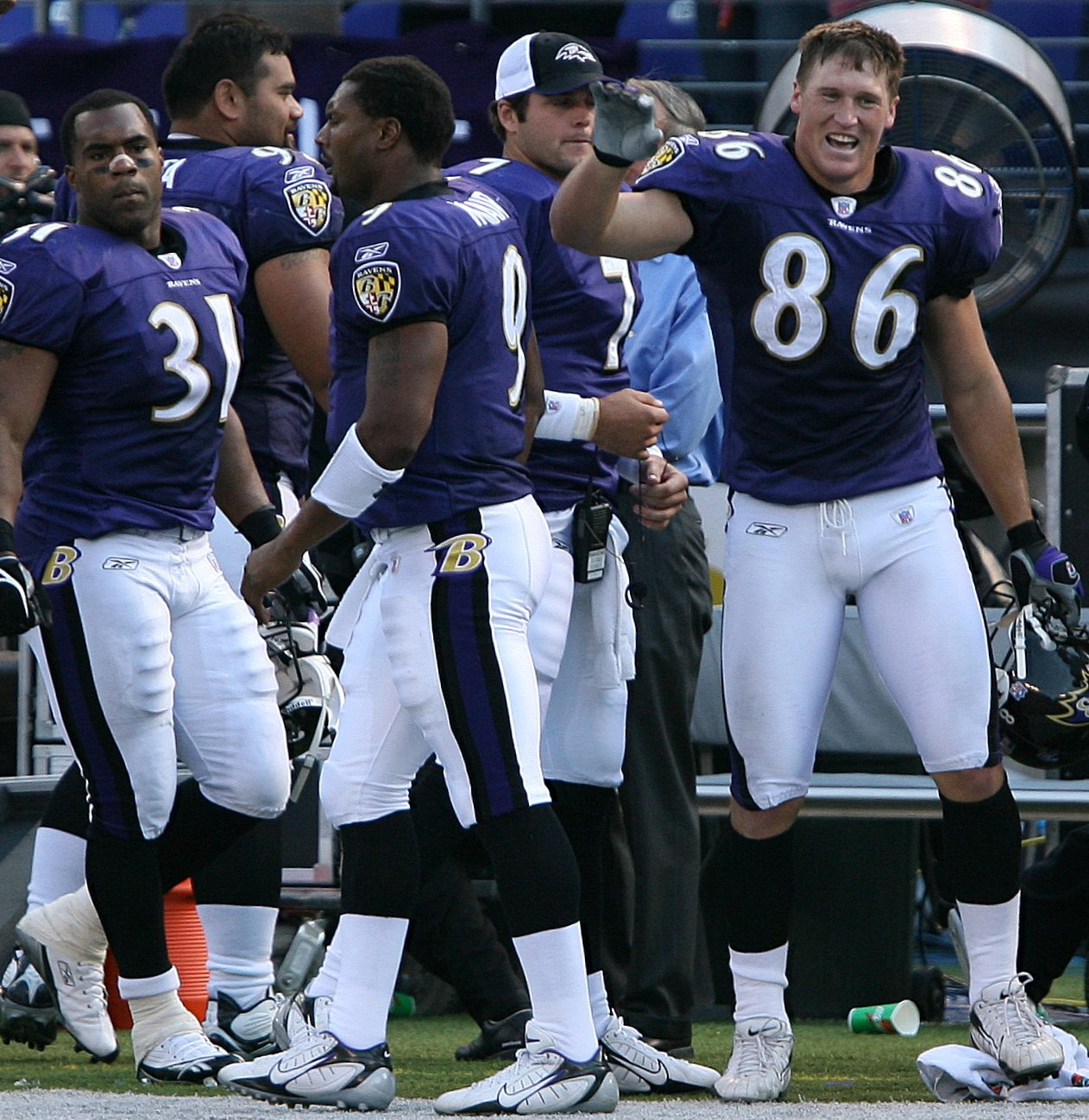
Boller (7) with the Ravens in 2006

Boller started all 16 games the only time in his career in 2004. He set career highs, completing 258-of-464 (55.6%) for 2,559 yards with 13 touchdowns and 11 interceptions. He also rushed 53 times for 189 yards and his 1st-career rushing touchdown. He had 4 games with QB ratings over 100, including a career-high 112.3 rating while going 18-of-34 for 219 yards, with a career-high four touchdowns and no interceptions against the Giants.

Despite not making the playoffs the previous year, the Baltimore Ravens were seen by the NFL and the sports media as being contenders for the Super Bowl, resulting in four primetime games: two Sunday night games, and two spots featured on Monday Night Football. A factor in this was Boller's perceived status of "coming into his own", and so the Ravens were poised to start what would be a great season by taking on the Indianapolis Colts on the first primetime Sunday Night game of the season. The Ravens held their own in the first half, limiting the Colts to only 3 points, and Boller looked solid in the pocket, leading the offense down the field to the red zone several times. But it did not last, as Boller was injured in the third quarter, suffering a bad case of "turf toe", that would wind up keeping him out of action for 7 games. The Ravens season went downhill after that, even going four games without a single passing touchdown. When Boller came back against the Bengals, after posting an 8.0 QB rating (4-of-12 [33%] for 37 yards and 1 interception) in the 1st half, he exploded in the 2nd half, going 14-of-20 [70%] for 174 yards, 3 touchdowns and 1 interception for a 115.4 QB rating in the final 2 quarters. In back to back games, he (and the entire team) finally seemed to come alive and show the promise everyone had been expecting, as he completed 19-of-27 passes (70.4%) for 253 yards, 3 touchdowns and no interceptions for a career-high 136.8 QB rating in the 48–3 victory in Week 14 vs. the Green Bay Packers. Then, against the Minnesota Vikings, he posted a career-high 70.6 completion percentage (24-of-34) for 289 yards, 3 touchdowns and 1 interception for a 113.5 QB rating.

However, despite this, he still finished 2005 completing a career-high 58.4% of his passes (171-of-293) for 1,799 yards with 11 touchdowns and 12 interceptions despite missing almost 8 games due to injury.

Steve McNair, former Tennessee Titans QB, was traded to Baltimore in 2006. Coach Brian Billick declared McNair the starter instead of having the two compete for the job, citing McNair's credentials, including 2003 NFL Co-MVP, and Boller's propensity to turn over the ball. In Week 6 of the 2006 NFL season, McNair was sacked by Carolina Panthers defenders Mike Rucker and Chris Draft. The result of that play was a mild concussion and a neck injury. McNair left the game and would not return. Boller came in to replace him in the final seconds of the first quarter, and completed 17 of 31 passes for a 58% completion percentage, 3 touchdowns, 226 yards, and one interception. Faced with a 9-point deficit with 5:10 remaining, Boller connected with Mark Clayton for a 62-yard touchdown pass to start a comeback attempt. When the Ravens defense gave up their second touchdown of the day, Boller was called upon to score again. This time, he faced 68 yards and was given 4:08 to score a touchdown, to still be behind in the game. He drove down the field and capped off his drive with a 7-yard touchdown pass to tight end Todd Heap. The Panthers were then able to run out the clock before the Raven's offense could get back on the field, and Baltimore lost 23 – 21. Then, after McNair's throwing hand was stepped on against Cleveland on Dec 17, Boller led the Ravens to victory with a 13-of-21, 238-yard and two-touchdown performance (112.3 passer rating), one touchdown being the game highlight, when he connected with explosive rookie receiver Demetrius Williams for the 77 yard score. That victory clinched a playoff berth for the Ravens, who had already all but locked up their division. With McNair as the starting quarterback the Ravens improved to a franchise best mark of 13–3 on the season, as compared to only going 6–10 the previous year with Boller at the helm.

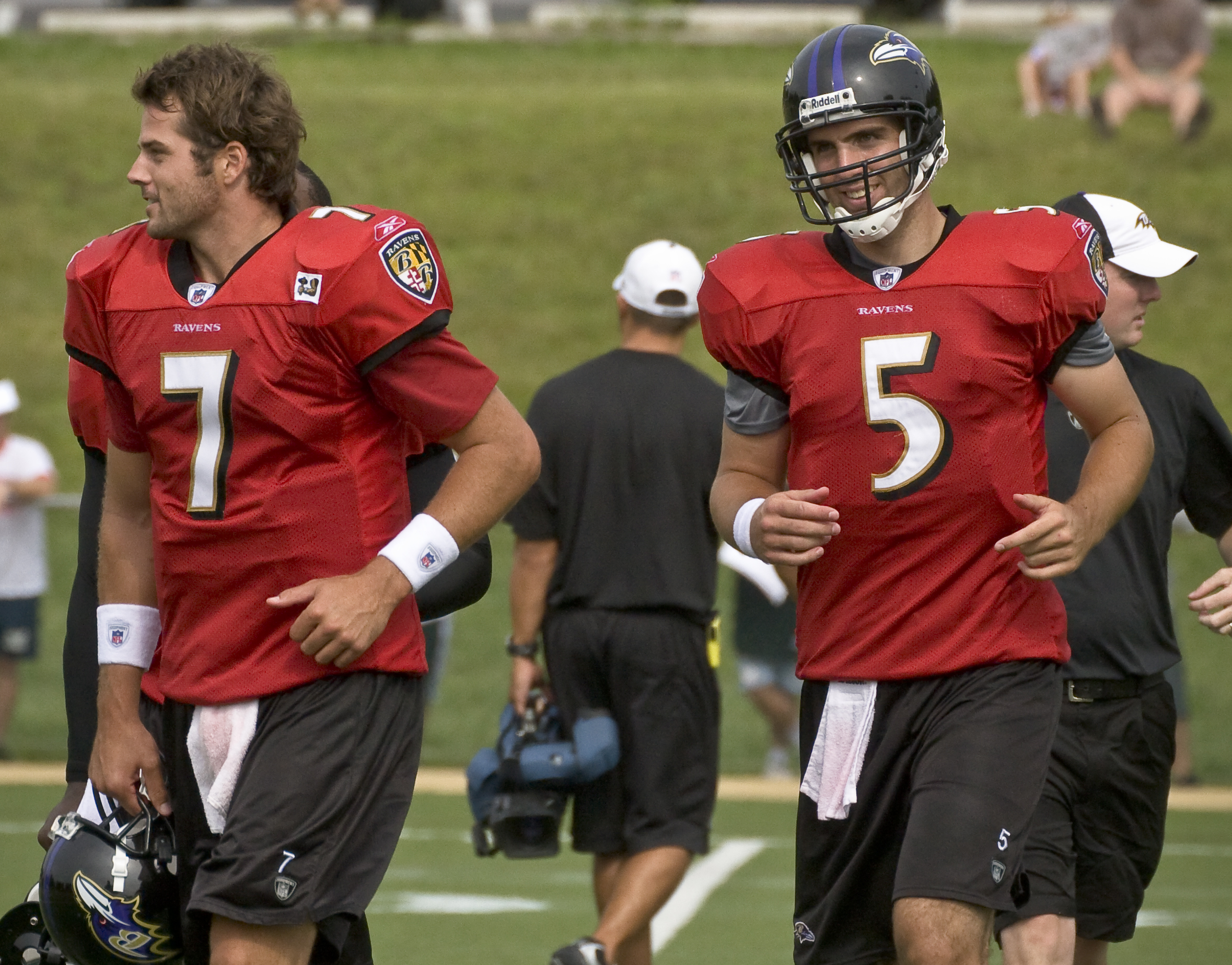
Boller (left) and Joe Flacco during Ravens 2008 training camp

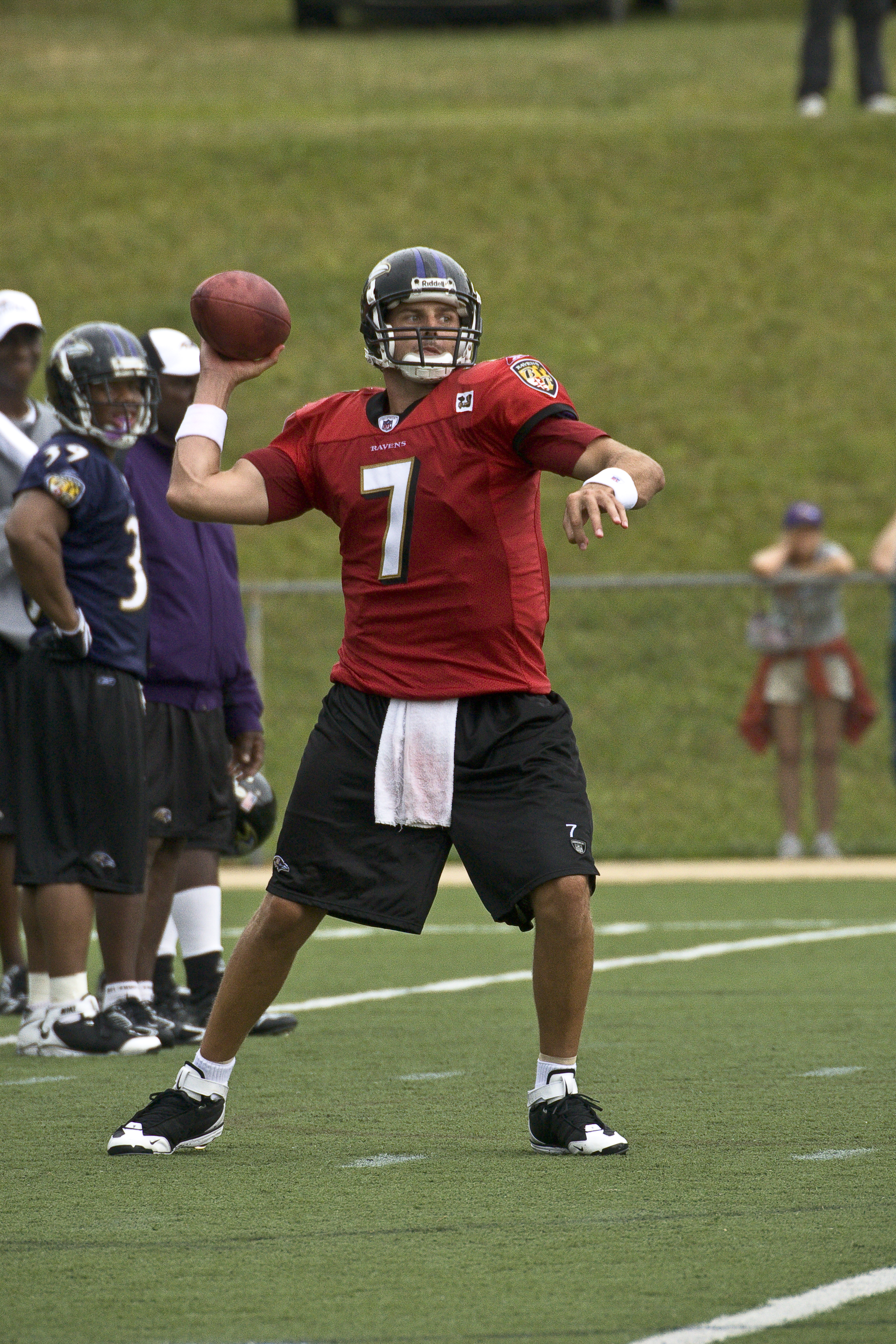
Boller (7) practices with the Ravens in 2008.

After McNair was injured in the first game of the 2007 season against the Cincinnati Bengals, Boller was given the opportunity to start. He came in late in the game and was unable to pull out a victory. Boller was then named the interim starter in Week 2, in a home game against the New York Jets. He had a strong showing, throwing two touchdowns and no interceptions for 185 yds and a QB rating of 97.9. In Week 3, McNair retook the reins of the team, facing the Arizona Cardinals. The team was up in the 4th, and they switched Boller in to rest McNair, and in spite of a late comeback effort by Kurt Warner, Boller managed to get the team in position for a game-winning field goal. The following 2 games Boller was back on the bench. In weeks 6 and 7, Boller was once again named the interim starter for the Ravens.

Following the Week 8 Bye, the Ravens once again decided to go with McNair as their starter. Two bad losses against division rivals followed. After Week 10, which featured a humiliating loss against the Cincinnati Bengals, during which McNair committed 3 fumbles, it was decided that Boller would officially be the starting quarterback for the remainder of the season. Boller led the Ravens in a hard-fought game against the Cleveland Browns, in which the Ravens attempted to make a late comeback, which ended in what seemed to be a win after a missed field goal attempt by Cleveland. However, the refs reviewed the play and found that it was in fact a good field goal, and the game went into overtime. Boller and the Ravens eventually lost 33–30.

They then faced the New England Patriots on Monday Night Football. Boller finished the game with 2 touchdowns and 1 interception. The Ravens lost 27–24.

The Ravens next traveled to Miami to face off against the winless Miami Dolphins. Boller had his season end early with yet another injury, this time a mild concussion. Backup rookie quarterback Troy Smith played the remainder of the game, leading the team into overtime, where they eventually lost, 22–16, giving the Dolphins their sole win of the season.

The 2007 Ravens ended their season with a record of 5–11, which led to the firing of head coach Brian Billick and the drafting of future quarterback Joe Flacco.

Following the retirement of Steve McNair, Boller faced a three-way battle for the starting job between himself, former Heisman Trophy winner Troy Smith, and the rookie Flacco, who was drafted with the Ravens' first round draft choice. Boller was given the starting job against the New England Patriots in the 2008 pre-season opener, but following another injury suffered in a preseason game against the Minnesota Vikings, his season ended when the Ravens placed him on injured reserve on September 3.

=== St. Louis Rams ===
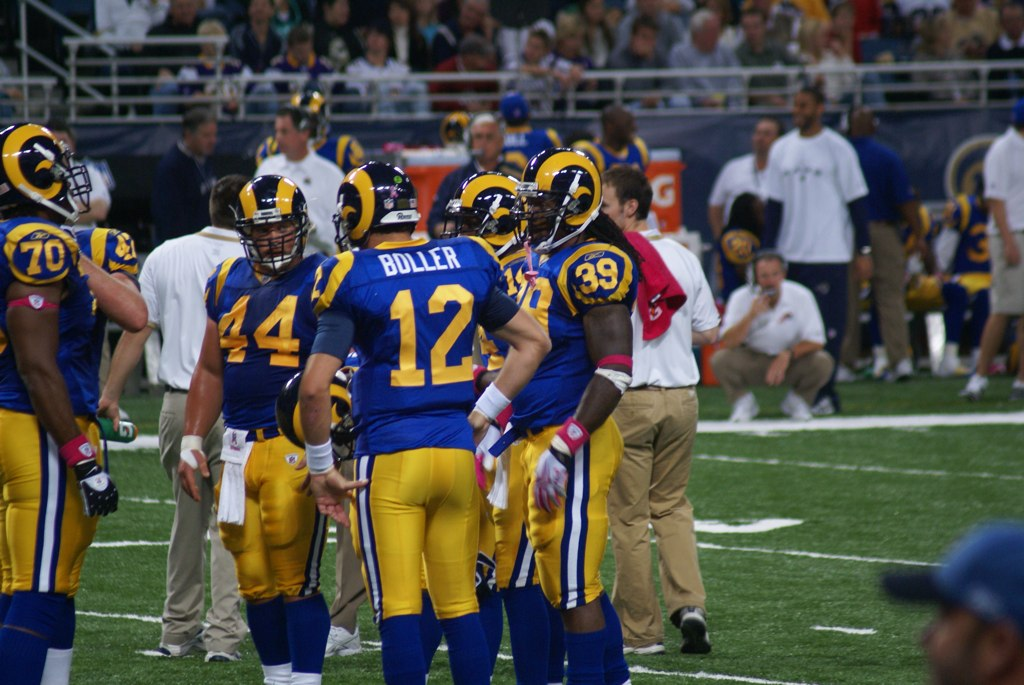
Boller (12) in the Rams' huddle in 2009

An unrestricted free agent in the 2009 offseason, Boller signed with the St. Louis Rams on April 4 as the backup to starting quarterback Marc Bulger. Boller saw action on September 27 against the Green Bay Packers after Bulger sustained a bruised rotator cuff. He passed for 164 yards, two touchdowns and an interception along with 31 rushing yards in the 36–17 loss. In Week 4 against the San Francisco 49ers, he threw an interception and fumbled, both returned for touchdowns.

=== Oakland Raiders ===
On April 15, 2010, Boller signed with the Raiders. On October 24, 2010, Boller saw some game action in the Raiders-Broncos game. He rushed six times for 11 yards in the Raiders' blowout 59–14 win. In March 2011, the Raiders resigned Boller for one year at $1.25 million. In October, Boller became the Raiders' starting quarterback after Jason Campbell suffered a collarbone injury against the Cleveland Browns. Boller replaced Campbell, and the Raiders held on to beat the Browns.

The following week, due to Campbell's injury, Boller started his first game as a Raider against the Chiefs. He was ineffective, throwing three interceptions, and was eventually replaced in the game by the newly acquired Carson Palmer, who went on to throw three interceptions himself. Boller became the primary backup to Palmer for the rest of the season.

=== San Diego Chargers and retirement ===
An unrestricted free agent in the 2012 offseason, Boller signed with the San Diego Chargers on July 27, 2012, after backup Charlie Whitehurst suffered a knee injury in training camp. After the signing, however, Boller opted to retire.

== Career statistics ==
=== NFL ===
Year	Team	Games			Passing								Rushing				Sacks		Fumbles	
Year	Team	GP	GS	Record	Cmp	Att	Pct	Yds	Avg	TD	Int	Rate	Att	Yds	Avg	TD	Sck	SckY	Fum	Lost
2003	BAL	11	9	5−4	116	224	51.8	1,260	5.6	7	9	62.4	30	62	2.1	0	17	92	9	3
2004	BAL	16	16	9–7	258	464	55.6	2,559	5.5	13	11	70.9	53	189	3.6	1	35	247	11	7
2005	BAL	9	9	4–5	171	293	58.4	1,799	6.1	11	12	71.8	23	66	2.9	1	23	146	8	2
2006	BAL	5	0	—	33	55	60.0	485	8.8	5	2	104.0	22	34	1.6	0	3	16	3	1
2007	BAL	12	8	2–6	168	275	61.1	1,743	6.3	9	10	75.2	19	89	4.7	0	24	159	5	4
2008	BAL	0	0	—	Did not play due to injury															
2009	STL	7	4	0–4	98	176	55.7	899	5.1	3	6	61.2	13	76	5.8	0	17	117	2	2
2010	OAK	5	0	—	2	4	50.0	25	6.3	0	1	30.2	7	18	2.6	0	1	6	1	0
2011	OAK	2	1	0–1	15	28	53.6	161	5.8	0	3	31.1	9	38	4.2	0	3	19	3	0
Career		67	47	20–27	861	1,519	56.7	8,931	5.9	48	54	69.5	176	572	3.3	2	123	802	42	19

=== College ===
Season	Team	GP	Passing						
Season	Team	GP	Cmp	Att	Pct	Yds	TD	Int	Rtg
1999	California	10	100	259	38.6	1,303	9	15	80.8
2000	California	11	163	349	46.7	2,121	15	13	104.5
2001	California	10	134	272	49.3	1,741	12	10	110.2
2002	California	12	225	421	53.3	2,815	28	10	126.8
Totals		43	622	1,301	47.8	7,980	64	48	108.2

== Career highlights ==
- Second-team All-Pac-10 (2002)
- AFC Offensive Player of the Week (week 14, 2004)
- 3rd all-time Baltimore Ravens record for most career passing yards (7,846).
- 3rd most games played as Baltimore Ravens quarterback (53).
- 3rd most games started as Baltimore Ravens quarterback (42).
- Boller's record as a starter in full games for the Ravens was 21–19. His home record at M&T Bank Stadium as a starter was 16–7.
- Boller has 9 career games with QB ratings over 100. He also has 11 career games with at least 1 touchdown thrown and no interceptions.
- In 2005, he led the Ravens to back-to-back primetime wins over the Packers and Vikings. The Ravens won those two games with a combined 78–26, with Boller throwing 6 touchdowns and 1 INT. The 48–3 victory over the Favre-led Green Bay Packers remains a Monday Night Football record.

== Personal life ==
On July 2, 2010, Boller married former Miss California USA Carrie Prejean. They have two children: Grace (b. 2011) and Brody (b. 2013).
