= Paul Arnold (Michigan politician) =

American politician (1893–1973)

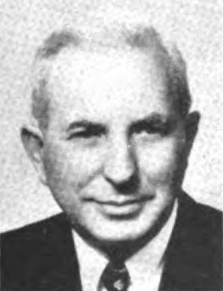

Member of the Michigan House of Representatives from the Wayne County 1st district
- In office January 1, 1947 – 1948

Personal details
- Born: June 29, 1893 Neckarwestheim, Württemberg, Germany
- Died: February 17, 1973 (aged 79) Pinellas, Florida, U.S.
- Party: Republican
- Spouse: Lillian Kroepel
- Children: 3

Paul Arnold (June 29, 1893 – February 17, 1973) was a Michigan politician.

== Early life ==
Arnold was born on June 29, 1893, in Neckarwestheim, Württemberg, Germany. Arnold was orphaned in 1907. Arnold moved to Philadelphia, Pennsylvania, where he learned about the butcher business.

== Career ==
In 1912, Arnold moved to Detroit. There, Arnold worked in the meat industry for 1913 to 1923. Arnold became a naturalized citizen in 1924. Arnold was an alternate delegate to Republican National Convention from Michigan in 1932 and 1936. In 1944, Arnold ran unsuccessfully to become a member of the Michigan House of Representatives from Wayne County 1st district. On November 5, 1946, Arnold was elected as a member of the Michigan House of Representatives from Wayne County 1st district where he served from January 1, 1947, to 1948. Arnold was not re-elected in 1948, was defeated again in both 1950 and 1952.

== Personal life ==
Arnold married Lillian Kroepel on November 26, 1914. Together they had three children.

== Death ==
Arnold died in last place of residence, St. Petersburg, Florida, on February 17, 1973. Arnold was interred at Royal Palm South Cemetery in St. Petersburg, Florida.
