= Paul Arnold (American football) =

American gridiron football player (born 1980)

No. 20
- Position: Running back

Personal information
- Born: September 27, 1980 (age 46); Seattle, Washington, U.S.
- Listed height: 6 ft 1 in (1.85 m)
- Listed weight: 213 lb (97 kg)

Career information
- High school: John F. Kennedy Catholic (Burien, Washington)
- College: Washington
- NFL draft: 2003: undrafted

Career history
- Indianapolis Colts (2003)*; Edmonton Eskimos (2003)
- * Offseason or practice squad member only

Paul Arnold (born September 27, 1980) is an American former football running back/wide receiver who played at the University of Washington from 1999 through 2002. He is one of the most decorated high school football players ever from Washington.

As a sophomore at O'Dea High School in Seattle, Washington, Arnold was the 1996 Class 2A player of the year after he rushed for 1,136 yards on 70 carries for 16.2 yards per carry and scored 26 TDs. As a junior in 1997, at Kennedy High School in Burien, a suburb of Seattle, he rushed for 800 yards and 11 TDs in an injury plagued season. In 1998, as a senior, he rushed for 1,974 yards and 32 TDs and had 2,555 all-purpose yards. He was named to the All-State team and selected as the Class 3A player of the year. He was also named to the Parade All-American team and to the USA Today All-American team. In track, as a junior, he won the state 3A title in the 200 meters with a time of 21.8. His top 100 meter time in high school was 10.6. At the Nike Football Training Camp in Portland, he ran the 40-yard dash in 4.33. In a recruiting battle, Arnold chose the University of Washington over Colorado, Notre Dame and other schools.

Playing as a running back as a true freshman in 1999, Arnold appeared in all 11 regular season games and in the Holiday Bowl against Kansas State University. In the second game of his college career, he set a school record with a 100-yard kickoff return for a TD against Air Force. It earned him the Pac-10 Special Teams Player of the week. In the Apple Cup game against rival Washington State University, he had an 80-yard TD run from scrimmage and finished the game with 126 yards on 14 carries. He finished the year 19th in the nation with a kickoff return average of 24.9 yards per return. In the 2000 season, he became the starting tailback. On October 7, 2000, against Oregon State University, in the Huskies 33–30 win over the Beavers, which was their only loss of the season, he rushed for 102 yards and had 65 receiving yards in earning the Pac 10 Offensive player of the week. Because of an injury, he missed the remainder of the 2000 season.

In 2001, he converted to wide receiver and started his last two years opposite All-Pac 10 wide receiver Reggie Williams.

Following his college career, he signed a free agent contract with the Indianapolis Colts in 2003, but he was released at the end of the preseason. He signed a contract with the Edmonton Eskimos of the Canadian Football League, but later decided not to pursue a professional football career.
