= Jason Fife =

American football player (born 1981)

No. 11, 12
- Position: Quarterback

Personal information
- Born: January 23, 1981 (age 45); San Bernardino, California, U.S.
- Listed height: 6 ft 4 in (1.93 m)
- Listed weight: 225 lb (102 kg)

Career information
- College: Oregon
- NFL draft: 2004: undrafted

Career history
- Detroit Lions (2004)*; Minnesota Vikings (2005)*; Rhein Fire (2005); Las Vegas Gladiators (2006); New Orleans Saints (2006); Washington Redskins (2007)*; Dallas Desperados (2008)
- * Offseason or practice squad member only

Career AFL statistics
- Comp. / Att.: 206 / 357
- Passing yards: 2,219
- TD–INT: 40-13
- QB rating: 88.91
- Rushing TD: 12
- Stats at ArenaFan.com

Jason Fife (born January 23, 1981) is an American former professional football player who was a quarterback in the Arena Football League (AFL). He played college football for the Oregon Ducks and was signed as an undrafted free agent by the Detroit Lions of the National Football League (NFL) in 2004.

== College career ==
Fife played college football at the University of Oregon, backing up Joey Harrington until Harrington left for the 2002 NFL draft and Fife became the starter. In 2002 Fife was ranked the #2 QB in the nation.

On September 20, 2003, Fife, sharing QB duties with Kellen Clemens, helped lead the 22nd-ranked Ducks in an upset of the then-third-ranked Michigan Wolverines. Fife's second-quarter 15-yard touchdown run became the cover of Sports Illustrated in the September 29th issue.

== Professional career ==
Fife was not drafted in the 2004 NFL draft. He signed with the Detroit Lions as a free agent, but was cut from the team during training camp.

Fife was on the practice squad for the New Orleans Saints from 2006 to 2007. In December 2007, he joined the Washington Redskins' practice squad.

Fife also played for a time in the Arena Football League for the Las Vegas Gladiators, and in 2008 with the Dallas Desperados.

== Coaching ==
Fife has also coached in various positions for different high school programs. Most recently, he is an assistant coach for the Sheldon High School Fighting Irish football team in Eugene, Oregon.

== Personal life ==
Jason is married, and has 4 children, all of which are named after comic book characters. He is now a dentist in Oregon.
