= List of USC Trojans football seasons =

This is a list of ongoing and completed seasons by the USC Trojans football team since its conception in 1888.

== Seasons ==
Year	Coach	Overall	Conference	Standing	Bowl/playoffs	Coaches^{#}	AP^{°}
Henry H. Goddard & Frank Suffel (Independent) (1888)
1888	Goddard & Suffel	2–0					
Independent (1889–1896)
1889	No coach	2–0					
1890	No team						
1891	No coach	1–2					
1892	No team						
1893	No coach	3–1					
1894	No coach	1–0					
1895	No coach	0–1–1					
1896	No coach	0–3					
Lewis R. Freeman (Independent) (1897)
1897	Lewis R. Freeman	5–1					
Independent (1898–1900)
1898	No coach	5–1–1					
1899	No coach	2–3–1					
1900	No coach	1–1–1					
Clair Tappaan (Independent) (1901)
1901	Clair Tappaan	0–1					
1902	No coach	2–3					
John Walker (Independent) (1903)
1903	John Walker	4–2					
Harvey Holmes (Independent) (1904–1907)
1904	Harvey Holmes	6–1					
1905	Harvey Holmes	6–3–1					
1906	Harvey Holmes	2–0–2					
1907	Harvey Holmes	5–1					
Bill Traeger (Independent) (1908)
1908	Bill Traeger	3–1–1					
Dean Cromwell (Independent) (1909–1910)
1909	Dean Cromwell	3–1–2					
1910	Dean Cromwell	7–0–1					
1911–13	No team						
Ralph Glaze (Independent) (1914–1915)
1914	Ralph Glaze	4–3					
1915	Ralph Glaze	3–4					
Dean Cromwell (Independent) (1916–1918)
1916	Dean Cromwell	5–3					
1917	Dean Cromwell	4–2–1					
1918	Dean Cromwell	2–2–2					
Gus Henderson (Independent) (1919–1921)
1919	Gus Henderson	4–1					
1920	Gus Henderson	6–0					
1921	Gus Henderson	10–1					
Gus Henderson (Pacific Coast Conference) (1922–1924)
1922	Gus Henderson	10–1	3–1	4th	W Rose		
1923	Gus Henderson	6–2	2–2	T–3rd			
1924	Gus Henderson	9–2	2–1	T–4th	W Christmas Festival		
Howard Jones (Pacific Coast Conference) (1925–1940)
1925	Howard Jones	11–2	3–2	T–3rd			
1926	Howard Jones	8–2	5–1	2nd			
1927	Howard Jones	8–1–1	4–0–1	T–1st			
1928	Howard Jones	9–0–1	4–0–1	T–1st			
1929	Howard Jones	10–2	6–1	1st	W Rose		
1930	Howard Jones	8–2	5–1	2nd			
1931	Howard Jones	10–1	7–0	1st	W Rose		
1932	Howard Jones	10–0	6–0	1st	W Rose		
1933	Howard Jones	10–1–1	4–1–1	3rd			
1934	Howard Jones	4–6–1	1–4–1	7th			
1935	Howard Jones	5–7	2–4	8th			
1936	Howard Jones	4–2–3	3–2–2	T–3rd			
1937	Howard Jones	4–4–2	2–3–2	7th			
1938	Howard Jones	9–2	6–1	T–1st	W Rose		7
1939	Howard Jones	8–0–2	5–0–2	1st	W Rose		3
1940	Howard Jones	3–4–2	2–3–2	7th			
Sam Barry (Pacific Coast Conference) (1941)
1941	Sam Barry	2–6–1	2–4–1	8th			
Jeff Cravath (Pacific Coast Conference) (1942–1950)
1942	Jeff Cravath	5–5–1	4–2–1	4th			
1943	Jeff Cravath	8–2	5–0	1st	W Rose		
1944	Jeff Cravath	8–0–2	3–0–2	1st	W Rose		7
1945	Jeff Cravath	7–4	5–1	1st	L Rose		11
1946	Jeff Cravath	6–4	5–2	3rd			
1947	Jeff Cravath	7–2–1	6–0	1st	L Rose		8
1948	Jeff Cravath	6–3–1	4–2	3rd			
1949	Jeff Cravath	5–3–1	4–2	T–3rd			
1950	Jeff Cravath	2–5–2	1–3–2	7th			
Jess Hill (Pacific Coast Conference) (1951–1956)
1951	Jess Hill	7–3	4–2	4th			
1952	Jess Hill	10–1	6–0	1st	W Rose	4	5
1953	Jess Hill	6–3–1	4–2–1	3rd			
1954	Jess Hill	8–4	6–1	2nd	L Rose	11	17
1955	Jess Hill	6–4	3–3	6th		12	13
1956	Jess Hill	8–2	5–2	T–2nd		15	18
Don Clark (Pacific Coast Conference / AAWU) (1957–1959)
1957	Don Clark	1–9	1–6	7th			
1958	Don Clark	4–5–1	4–2–1	3rd			
1959	Don Clark	8–2	3–1	1st		13	14
John McKay (AAWU / Pacific-8 Conference) (1960–1975)
1960	John McKay	4–6	3–1	2nd			
1961	John McKay	4–5–1	2–1–1	T–2nd			
1962	John McKay	11–0	4–0	1st	W Rose	1	1
1963	John McKay	7–3	3–1	2nd		16	
1964	John McKay	7–3	3–1	T–1st		10	10
1965	John McKay	7–2–1	4–1	2nd		9	10
1966	John McKay	7–4	4–1	1st	L Rose	18	
1967	John McKay	10–1	6–1	1st	W Rose	1	1
1968	John McKay	9–1–1	6–0	1st	L Rose	2	4
1969	John McKay	10–0–1	6–0	1st	W Rose	4	3
1970	John McKay	6–4–1	3–4	T–6th			
1971	John McKay	6–4–1	3–2–1	2nd			20
1972	John McKay	12–0	7–0	1st	W Rose	1	1
1973	John McKay	9–2–1	7–0	1st	L Rose	2	4
1974	John McKay	10–1–1	6–0–1	1st	W Rose	1	2
1975	John McKay	8–4	3–4	5th	W Liberty	19	17
John Robinson (Pacific-8 / Pacific-10 Conference) (1976–1982)
1976	John Robinson	11–1	7–0	1st	W Rose	2	2
1977	John Robinson	8–4	5–2	T–2nd	W Bluebonnet	12	13
1978	John Robinson	12–1	6–1	1st	W Rose	1	2
1979	John Robinson	11–0–1	6–0–1	1st	W Rose	2	2
1980	John Robinson	8–2–1	4–2–1	3rd		12	11
1981	John Robinson	9–3	5–2	T–2nd	L Fiesta	13	14
1982	John Robinson	8–3	5–2	T–3rd			15
Ted Tollner (Pacific-10 Conference) (1983–1986)
1983	Ted Tollner	4–6–1	4–3	4th			
1984	Ted Tollner	9–3	7–1	1st	W Rose	9	10
1985	Ted Tollner	6–6	5–3	T–4th	L Aloha		
1986	Ted Tollner	7–5	5–3	T–4th	L Citrus		
Larry Smith (Pacific-10 Conference) (1987–1992)
1987	Larry Smith	8–4	7–1	T–1st	L Rose	17	18
1988	Larry Smith	10–2	8–0	1st	L Rose	9	7
1989	Larry Smith	9–2–1	6–0	1st	W Rose	9	8
1990	Larry Smith	8–4–1	5–2–1	2nd	L John Hancock	22	20
1991	Larry Smith	3–8	2–6	8th			
1992	Larry Smith	6–5–1	5–3	T–3rd	L Freedom		
John Robinson (Pacific-10 Conference) (1993–1997)
1993	John Robinson	8–5	6–2	T–1st	W Freedom	25	
1994	John Robinson	8–3–1	6–2	T–2nd	W Cotton	15	13
1995	John Robinson	9–2–1	6–1–1	T–1st	W Rose	11	12
1996	John Robinson	6–6	3–5	T–5th			
1997	John Robinson	6–5	4–4	T–5th			
Paul Hackett (Pacific-10 Conference) (1998–2000)
1998	Paul Hackett	8–5	5–3	T–3rd	L Sun		
1999	Paul Hackett	6–6	3–5	T–6th			
2000	Paul Hackett	5–7	2–6	T–8th			
Pete Carroll (Pacific-10 Conference) (2001–2009)
2001	Pete Carroll	6–6	5–3	5th	L Las Vegas		
2002	Pete Carroll	11–2	7–1	T–1st	W Orange^{†}	4	4
2003	Pete Carroll	12–1	7–1	1st	W Rose^{†}	2	1
2004	Pete Carroll	13–0 (11-0) (Note: In 2010, NCAA imposed sanctions against the Trojan football program and vacated the last 2 wins in 2004, and all 12 wins from 2005, 2004 BCS Championship and Pacific-10 Conference titles from both years. However, the team's loss in 2005 was vacated as well.)	8–0 (7-0)	1st	W Orange^{†}	1	1
2005	Pete Carroll	12–1 (0-0)	8–0 (0-0)	1st	L Rose^{†}	2	2
2006	Pete Carroll	11–2	7–2	T–1st	W Rose^{†}	4	4
2007	Pete Carroll	11–2	7–2	T–1st	W Rose^{†}	2	3
2008	Pete Carroll	12–1	8–1	1st	W Rose^{†}	2	3
2009	Pete Carroll	9–4	5–4	T–5th	W Emerald	20	22
Lane Kiffin (Pacific-10 / Pac-12 Conference) (2010–2013)
2010	Lane Kiffin	8–5	5–4	T–3rd	Ineligible (Note: USC ineligible for championship and post–season due to NCAA sanctions..)		
2011	Lane Kiffin	10–2	7–2	1st (South)	Ineligible		6
2012	Lane Kiffin	7–6	5–4	T–2nd (South)	L Sun		
2013	Lane Kiffin (Note: Head coach Lane Kiffin, who was in his fourth year, was fired on September 29 after a 3–2 start to the season. He was replaced by interim head coach Ed Orgeron. At the end of the regular season, Washington head coach Steve Sarkisian was hired as the new head coach beginning in 2014. This prompted Orgeron to resign before the bowl game. Clay Helton led the Trojans in the Las Vegas Bowl.)	10–4	6–3	T–2nd (South)	W Las Vegas	19	19
Steve Sarkisian (Pac-12 Conference) (2014–2015)
2014	Steve Sarkisian	9–4	6–3	T–2nd (South)	W Holiday	21	20
2015	Steve Sarkisian (Note: Clay Helton became the interim head coach of the Trojans after head coach Steve Sarkisian took a leave of absence, and was then subsequently fired. On November 30, 2015, USC removed the interim tag and formally named Helton the 23rd head coach in school history.)	8–6	6–3	T–1st (South)	L Holiday		
Clay Helton (Pac-12 Conference) (2015–2021)
2016	Clay Helton	10–3	7–2	2nd (South)	W Rose^{†}	5	3
2017	Clay Helton	11–3	8–1	1st (South)	L Cotton^{†}	10	12
2018	Clay Helton	5–7	4–5	3rd (South)			
2019	Clay Helton	8–5	7–2	2nd (South)	L Holiday		
2020	Clay Helton	5–1	5–0	1st (South)		21	21
2021	Clay Helton (Note: Helton was fired on September 13 following the team's 28–42 loss to Stanford. Associate head coach Donte Williams took over as the team's interim head coach.)	4–8	3–6	T–4th (South)			
Lincoln Riley (Pac-12 Conference) (2022–2023)
2022	Lincoln Riley	11–3	8–1	2nd	L Cotton^{†}	13	12
2023	Lincoln Riley	8–5	5–4	T–4th	W Holiday		
Lincoln Riley (Big Ten Conference) (2024–present)
2024	Lincoln Riley	7–6	4–5	T–9th	W Las Vegas		
2025	Lincoln Riley	9–4	7–2	T–4th	L Alamo	21	20
Total:		888–376–54					
National championship Conference title Conference division title or championship game berth
^{†}Indicates Bowl Coalition, Bowl Alliance, BCS, or CFP / New Years' Six bowl.; ^{#}Rankings from final Coaches Poll.
