= List of USC Trojans head football coaches =

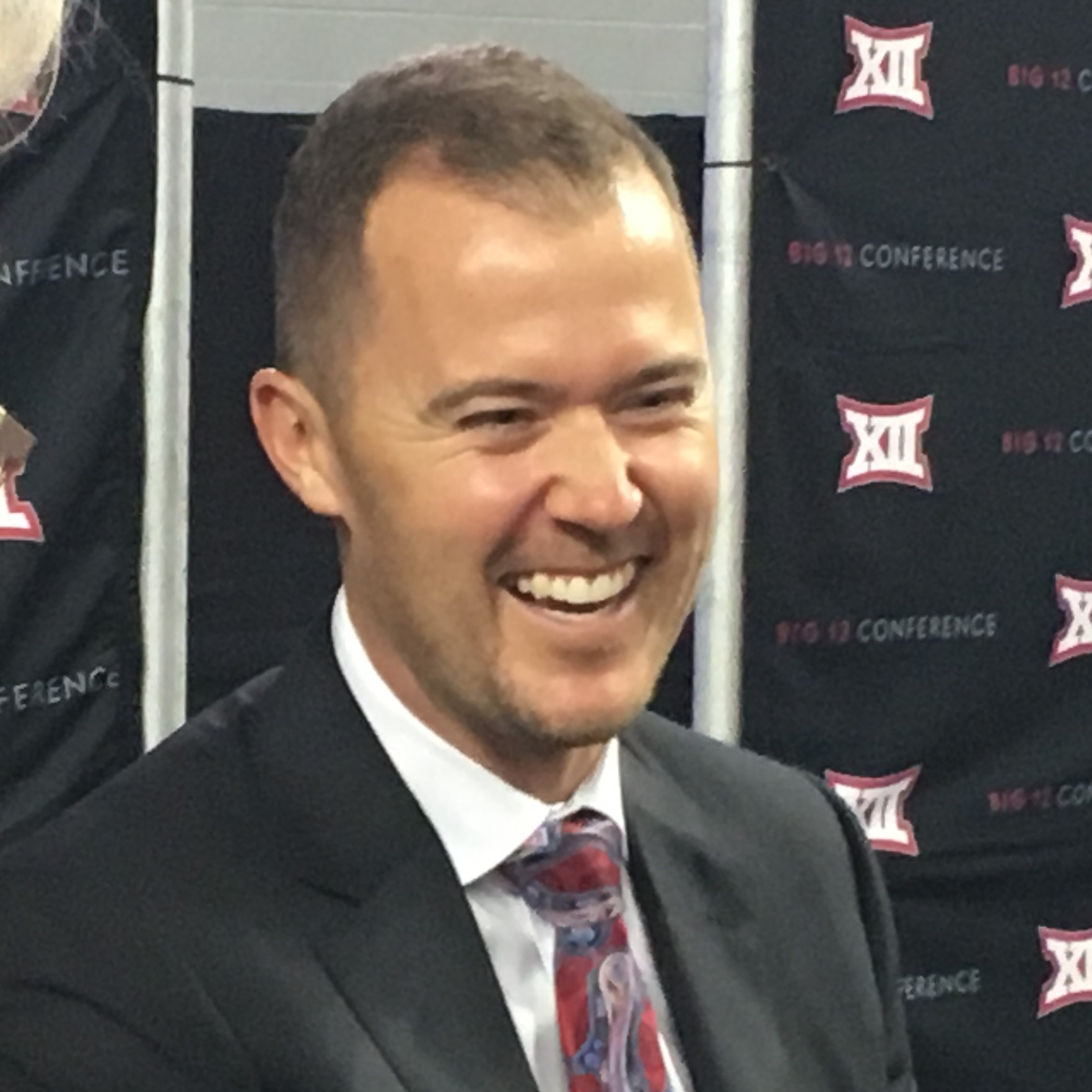
Lincoln Riley has served as head coach of the Trojans since 2022.

The USC Trojans college football team represents the University of Southern California (USC) in the Big Ten Conference. The Trojans compete as part of the NCAA Division I Football Bowl Subdivision. The program has had 26 head coaches and three interim head coaches since it began play during the 1888 season.

== Key ==
Key to symbols in coaches list
General		Overall		Conference		Postseason (Note: Although the first Rose Bowl Game was played in 1902, it has been continuously played since the 1916 game, and is recognized as the oldest bowl game by the NCAA. "—" indicates any season prior to 1916 when postseason games were not played.)	
No.	Order of coaches (Note: A running total of the number of head coaches, with coaches who served separate tenures being counted only once. Interim head coaches are represented with "Int" and are not counted in the running total. "—" indicates the team played but either without a coach or no coach is on record. "X" indicates an interim year without play.)	GC	Games coached	CW	Conference wins	PW	Postseason wins
DC	Division championships	OW	Overall wins	CL	Conference losses	PL	Postseason losses
CC	Conference championships	OL	Overall losses	CT	Conference ties	PT	Postseason ties
NC	National championships	OT	Overall ties (Note: Overtime rules in college football were introduced in 1996, making ties impossible in the period since.)	C%	Conference winning percentage		
†	Elected to the College Football Hall of Fame	O%	Overall winning percentage (Note: When computing the win–loss percentage, a tie counts as half a win and half a loss.)				

== Coaches ==
List of head football coaches showing season(s) coached, overall records, conference records, postseason records, championships and selected awards (Note: Statistics correct as of the end of the 2025 NCAA Division I FBS football season.)
No.	Name (Note: USC did not have a head coach for the 1889, 1891–1896, 1898–1900, and 1902 seasons.)	Season(s) (Note: USC did not field teams for the 1890, 1911–1913 seasons.)	GC	OW	OL	OT	O%	CW	CL	CT	C%	PW	PL	PT	CC	NC	Awards
1	Henry H. Goddard	1888	2	2	0	0	1.000	—	—	—	—	—	—	—	—	—	—
1	Frank H. Suffel	1888	2	2	0	0	1.000	—	—	—	—	—	—	—	—	—	—
2	Lewis R. Freeman	1897	6	5	1	0	0.833	—	—	—	—	—	—	—	—	—	—
3	Clair S. Tappaan	1901	2	0	2	0	.000	—	—	—	—	—	—	—	—	—	—
4	John Walker	1903	6	4	2	0	0.667	—	—	—	—	—	—	—	—	—	—
5	Harvey Holmes	1904–1907	27	19	5	3	0.759	—	—	—	—	—	—	—	—	—	—
6	William I. Traeger	1908	5	3	1	1	0.700	—	—	—	—	—	—	—	—	—	—
7 & 9	Dean Cromwell	1909–1910; 1916–1918	35	21	8	6	0.686	—	—	—	—	—	—	—	—	—	—
8	Ralph Glaze	1914–1915	14	7	7	0	0.500	—	—	—	—	—	—	—	—	—	—
10	Gus Henderson	1919–1925	52	45	7	0	0.865	7	4	0	0.636	2	0	0	0	0	—
11	Howard Jones^{†}	1925–1940	170	121	36	13	0.750	65	23	12	0.710	5	0	0	7	4; 1928; 1931; 1932; 1939	—
12	Sam Barry	1941	9	2	6	1	0.278	2	4	1	0.357	0	0	0	0	0	—
13	Jeff Cravath	1942–1950	90	54	28	8	0.644	37	12	5	0.731	2	2	0	4	0	—
14	Jess Hill	1951–1956	63	45	17	1	0.722	28	10	1	0.731	1	1	0	1	0	—
15	Don Clark	1957–1959	30	13	16	1	0.450	8	9	1	0.472	0	0	0	1	0	—
16	John McKay^{†}	1960–1975	175	127	40	8	0.749	70	17	3	0.794	6	3	0	9	4; 1962; 1967; 1972; 1974	AFCA Coach of the Year (1962, 1972); Eddie Robinson Coach of the Year (1962, 1972); Sporting News College Football COY (1972)
17 & 20	John Robinson^{†}	1976–1982; 1993–1997	143	104	35	4	0.741	63	23	3	0.725	7	1	0	5	1; 1978	—
18	Ted Tollner	1983–1986	47	26	20	1	0.564	21	10	0	0.677	1	2	0	1	0	—
19	Larry Smith	1987–1992	72	44	25	3	0.632	33	12	2	0.723	1	4	0	3	0	—
21	Paul Hackett	1998–2000	37	19	18	—	0.514	10	14	—	0.417	0	1	—	0	0	—
22	Pete Carroll	2001–2009	116	97	19	—	0.836	62	14	—	0.816	7	2	—	7	2; 2003; 2004	—
23	Lane Kiffin	2010–2013	43	28	15	—	0.651	17	12	—	0.586	0	1	—	0	0	—
Int.	Ed Orgeron	2013	8	6	2	—	0.750	6	1	—	0.857	0	0	—	0	0	—
Int. & 25	Clay Helton	2013; 2015–2021	70	46	24	—	0.657	36	13	—	0.735	1	3	—	1	0	—
24	Steve Sarkisian	2014–2015	18	12	6	—	0.667	7	5	—	0.583	1	0	—	0	0	—
Int.	Donte Williams	2021	10	3	7	—	0.300	3	5	—	0.375	0	0	—	0	0	—
26	Lincoln Riley	2022–present	53	35	18	—	0.660	24	12	—	0.667	2	2	—	0	0	—
