= 1888 California Golden Bears football team =

American college football season

1888 California Golden Bears football
- Conference: Independent
- Record: 6–1
- Head coach: None
- Captain: Charles W. Reed

1888 Western college football independents records
	Conf.			Overall
Team	W	L	T	W		L		T
USC		–		2	–	0	–	0
California		–		6	–	1	–	0

The 1888 California Golden Bears football team was an American football team that represented the University of California, Berkeley during the 1888 college football season. The team competed as an independent, without a head coach, and compiled a record of 6–1.

== Schedule ==
Date	Opponent	Site	Result
January 2	San Francisco Club	Berkeley, CA	W 26–0
February 25	Volunteers	Berkeley, CA	L 6–10
March 10	San Francisco Club	Berkeley, CA	W 20–0
March 17	Posens	Berkeley, CA	W 14–0
March 31	Wasps	Berkeley, CA	W 1–0
April 21	Wasps	Berkeley, CA	W 1–0
April 23	vs. San Francisco Club	Santa Rosa, CA	W 36–0
