= 1888 USC Methodists football team =

American college football season

1888 USC Methodists football
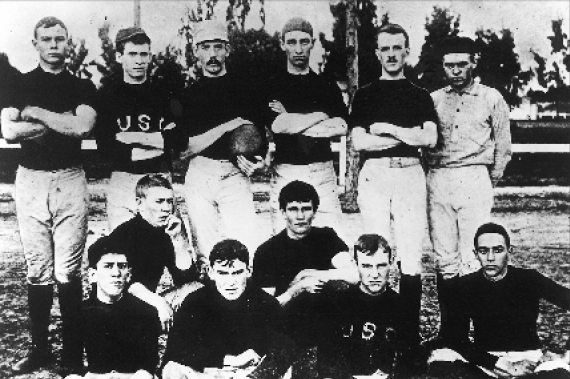
- The first USC football squad (1888)
- Conference: Independent
- Record: 2–0
- Head coach: Henry H. Goddard & Frank H. Suffel (1st season)
- Captain: Will Whitcomb
- Home stadium: USC campus

1888 Western college football independents records
	Conf.			Overall
Team	W	L	T	W		L		T
USC		–		2	–	0	–	0
California		–		6	–	1	–	0

The 1888 USC Methodists football team was an American football team that represented the University of Southern California during the 1888 college football season. The team competed as an independent under coaches Henry H. Goddard and Frank H. Suffel, compiling a 2–0 record.

== Schedule ==
Date	Opponent	Site	Result
November 14	Alliance AC	USC campus; Los Angeles, CA	W 16–0
January 19	vs. Alliance AC	Downtown lot; Los Angeles, CA	W 4–0
