= USC Trojans football =

American college football team at University of Southern California

2026 USC Trojans football team
- First season: 1888; 138 years ago
- Athletic director: Jennifer Cohen
- Head coach: Lincoln Riley; 5th season, 37–18 (.673)
- Location: Los Angeles, California
- Stadium: Los Angeles Memorial Coliseum (capacity: 77,500)
- NCAA division: Division I FBS
- Conference: Big Ten
- Colors: Cardinal and gold
- All-time record: 888–375–54 (.695)
- Bowl record: 36–20 (.643)

National championships
- Claimed: 1928, 1931, 1932, 1939, 1962, 1967, 1972, 1974, 1978, 2003, 2004
- Unclaimed: 1929, 1933, 1976, 1979, 2002, 2007

National finalist
- Poll era: 1931, 1932, 1962, 1968, 1972

Conference championships
- PCC: 1927, 1928, 1929, 1931, 1932, 1938, 1939, 1943, 1944, 1945, 1947, 1952 Pac-12: 1959, 1962, 1964, 1966, 1967, 1968, 1969, 1972, 1973, 1974, 1976, 1978, 1979, 1984, 1987, 1988, 1989, 1993, 1995, 2002, 2003, 2006, 2007, 2008, 2017

Division championships
- Pac-12 South: 2015, 2017, 2020, 2022
- Heisman winners: Mike Garrett – 1965; O. J. Simpson – 1968; Charles White – 1979; Marcus Allen – 1981; Carson Palmer – 2002; Matt Leinart – 2004; Reggie Bush – 2005; Caleb Williams – 2022
- Consensus All-Americans: 86
- Rivalries: UCLA (rivalry); Oregon (rivalry); Notre Dame (rivalry); Stanford (rivalry); California (rivalry)

Uniforms
- Fight song: "Fight On"
- Mascot: Traveler
- Marching band: Spirit of Troy
- Outfitter: Nike
- Website: usctrojans.com

The USC Trojans football team represents the University of Southern California in American football. The Trojans compete in the NCAA Football Bowl Subdivision (FBS) and the Big Ten Conference (Big Ten). They play home games at the 77,500-capacity Los Angeles Memorial Coliseum, located in Exposition Park adjacent to USC's University Park, Los Angeles, campus.

Formed in 1888, the program has over 860 wins and claims 11 national championships, including 7 from the major wire-services: AP Poll and/or Coaches Poll. USC has had 13 undefeated seasons including 8 perfect seasons, and 37 conference championships. The Trojans have produced eight Heisman Trophy winners, the most all-time by a university, and have had 582 NFL draft picks, which is only bettered by the University of Notre Dame. USC alumni include 84 first-team Consensus All-Americans, including 27 unanimous selections, and 35 College Football Hall of Fame members, including former players Matt Leinart, O. J. Simpson, and Ronnie Lott and former coaches John McKay and Howard Jones. The Trojans boast 14 inductees in the Pro Football Hall of Fame, tied with Notre Dame for most of any school, including Junior Seau, Bruce Matthews, Marcus Allen, and Ron Yary. Among all colleges and universities, as of 2022, USC holds the all-time record for the most quarterbacks (17) and is tied with the University of Miami for the most wide receivers (40) to play in the NFL. The Trojans have 56 bowl appearances, 39 of which are among the New Year's Six Bowls. With a record of 36–20, USC has the highest all-time post-season winning percentage of schools with 50 or more bowl appearances.

The Trojans play in red uniforms and helmets, both with gold highlights. Recognizable symbols include their fight song, "Fight On", and a horse mascot named Traveler. USC's fiercest and most prominent rivalry is with the Notre Dame Fighting Irish. It arose from frequent competition for national championships and is one of the best-known in college football. They also share a significant crosstown rivalry with the UCLA Bruins.

As of 2026, USC is the only FBS school to never play a school from the Football Championship Subdivision (FCS) since the 1978 split.

== History ==
=== 1888–1910s ===
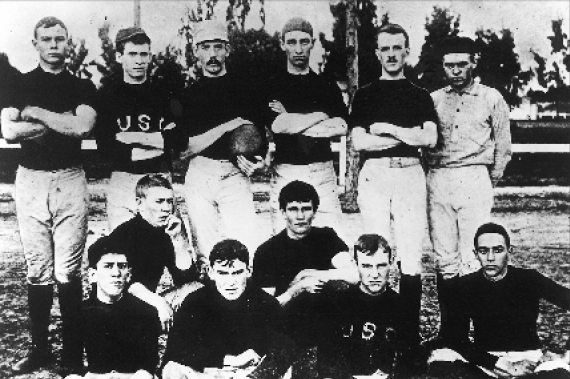
The first USC football squad (1888). Before they were nicknamed the "Trojans", they were known as the USC Methodists

USC first fielded a football team in 1888. Playing its first game on November 14 of that year against the Alliance Athletic Club, USC achieved a 16–0 victory. Frank Suffel and Henry H. Goddard were playing coaches for the first team which was put together by quarterback Arthur Carroll, who in turn volunteered to make the pants for the team and later became a tailor. USC faced its first collegiate opponent the following year in fall 1889, playing St. Vincent's College to a 40–0 victory.

In 1893, USC joined the Intercollegiate Football Association of Southern California (the forerunner of the SCIAC), which was composed of USC, Occidental College, Throop Polytechnic Institute (Caltech), and Chaffey College. Pomona College was invited to enter, but declined to do so. An invitation was also extended to Los Angeles High School.

Before they were named Trojans in 1912, USC athletic teams were called the Methodists (occasionally the "Fighting Methodists"), as well as the Wesleyans. During the early years, limitations in travel and the scarcity of major football-playing colleges on the West Coast limited its rivalries to local Southern Californian colleges and universities. During this period, USC played regular series against Occidental, Caltech, Whittier, Pomona and Loyola. The first USC team to play outside of Southern California went to Stanford on November 4, 1905, where they were trampled 16–0 by the traditional West Coast powerhouse. While the teams would not meet again until 1918 (Stanford dropped football for rugby union during the intervening years), this was also USC's first game against a future Pac-12 conference opponent and the beginning of its oldest rivalry. During this period USC also played its first games against other future Pac-12 rivals, including Oregon State (1914), California (1915), Oregon (1915), Arizona (1916) and Utah (1915–1917, 1919).

Between 1911 and 1913, USC followed the example of California and Stanford and dropped football in favor of rugby union. The results were disastrous, as USC was soundly defeated by more experienced programs while the school itself experienced financial reverses; it was during this period that Owen R. Bird, a sportswriter for the Los Angeles Times, coined the nickname "Trojans", which he wrote was "owing to the terrific handicaps under which the athletes, coaches and managers of the university were laboring and against the overwhelming odds of larger and better equipped rivals, the name 'Trojan' suitably fitted the players."

=== 1920s–1930s ===
After several decades of competition, USC first achieved national prominence under head coach "Gloomy" Gus Henderson in the early 1920s. Another milestone came under Henderson in 1922, when USC joined the Pacific Coast Conference (PCC), the forerunner of the modern Pac-12. Success continued under coach Howard Jones from 1925 to 1940, when the Trojans were just one of a few nationally dominant teams. It was during this era that the team achieved renown as the "Thundering Herd", earning its first four national titles.

=== 1940s–1950s ===
USC achieved intermittent success in the years following Jones' tenure. Jeff Cravath, who coached from 1942 to 1950, won the Rose Bowl in 1943 and 1945. Jess Hill, who coached from 1951 to 1956, won the Rose Bowl in 1953. From 1957 to 1959, the Trojans were coached by Don Clark. Future Hall of Famer Ron Mix was an All American for the Trojans in 1959.

=== 1960s–1970s ===
The program entered a new golden age upon the arrival of head coach John McKay (1960–1975). During this period, the Trojans produced two Heisman Trophy winners (Mike Garrett and O. J. Simpson) and won four national championships (1962, 1967, 1972 and 1974). McKay's influence continued even after he departed for the NFL when an assistant coach, John Robinson (1976–1982), took over as head coach. Under Robinson, USC won another national championship in 1978 (shared with Alabama; ironically, USC defeated Alabama, 24–14, that same season) and USC produced two more running-back Heisman Trophy winners in Charles White and Marcus Allen.

On September 12, 1970, USC opened the season at Alabama under legendary coach Paul "Bear" Bryant and became the first fully integrated team to play in the state of Alabama. The game, scheduled by Bryant, resulted in a dominating 42–21 win by the Trojans. More importantly, all six touchdowns scored by USC team were by black players, two by USC running back Sam "Bam" Cunningham, against an all-white Crimson Tide team. After the game, Bryant was able to persuade the university to allow black players to play, hastening the racial integration of football at Alabama and in the Deep South.

=== 1980s–1990s ===
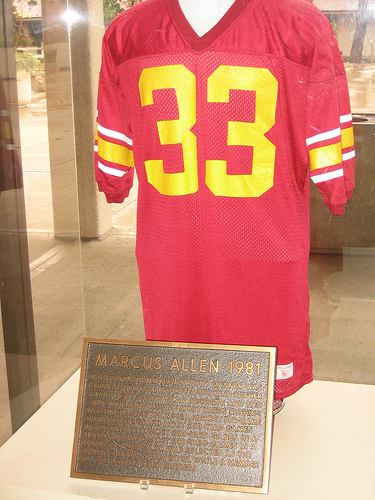
Marcus Allen's retired jersey

In the 1980s, USC football did not realize a national championship, though it continued to experience relative success, with top-20 AP rankings and Pac-10 Conference championships under head coaches Ted Tollner (1983–1986) and Larry Smith (1987–1992) Each coach led the team to a win in the Rose Bowl and USC was recognized among the nation's top-ten teams three times. Despite the moderate success of team during these years, some alumni had grown accustomed to the program's stature as a perennial national championship contender. In 1993, Robinson was named head coach a second time, leading the Trojans to a victory in the 1996 Rose Bowl over Northwestern.

It was during this time that the Trojans were unable to defeat their rivals. They suffered winless streaks of 13 years (1983–1995, including the 1994 17–17 tie) to rival Notre Dame and 8 years (1991–1998) to crosstown rival UCLA which were unacceptable to many USC supporters. Under Robinson the Trojans were 2–2–1 against Notre Dame, but unable to beat UCLA. After posting a 6–6 record in 1996, and a 6–5 record in 1997, Robinson was fired. In 1998, head coach Paul Hackett took over the team, but posted an even more disappointing 19–18 record in three seasons than any of his recent predecessors. By 2000, some observers surmised that USC football's days of national dominance were fading; the football team's record of 37–35 from 1996 to 2001 was their second-worst over any five-year span in history (only the mark of 29–29–2 from 1956 to 1961 was worse), and the period marked the first and only time USC had been out of the final top 20 teams for four straight years.

=== 2000s ===
==== 2001 ====
Carson Palmer's Heisman Trophy

In 2001, athletic director Mike Garrett released Hackett and hired Pete Carroll, a former NFL head coach. Carroll went 6–6 in his first year, losing to Utah in the Las Vegas Bowl, 10–6. After that, his teams became highly successful, ranking among the top ten teams in the country, with the exception of 2009 in which the team lost four regular season games. Carroll's final season with the Trojans was 2009.

==== 2002 ====
USC opened 3–2 in 2002, suffering losses to Kansas State and Washington State. However, the Trojans went on to win the rest of their games, completing the regular season 11–2 on the strength of senior quarterback Carson Palmer's breakout performance. After struggling for most of his collegiate career, Palmer excelled in the Pro Style offense installed by new offensive coordinator Norm Chow. In fact, Palmer's performance, particularly in the season-ending rivalry games against Notre Dame and UCLA, impressed so many pundits that he went on to win the Heisman Trophy, carrying every region of voting and becoming the first USC quarterback to be so honored. Despite tying for the Pac-10 title (with Washington State), having the highest BCS "strength of schedule" rating, and fielding the nation's top defense led by safety Troy Polamalu, USC finished the season ranked No. 5 in the BCS rankings. Facing off against BCS No. 3 Iowa in the Orange Bowl, USC defeated the Hawkeyes 38–17.

==== 2003 ====
In 2003, highly touted but unproven redshirt sophomore Matt Leinart took over the quarterback position from Palmer. Although his first pass went for a touchdown in a win over Auburn, the Trojans suffered an early season triple-overtime loss to their conference rival California in Berkeley. After the loss to California, USC went on a 10-game winning streak and finished the season with a record of 11–1. Before the postseason, both the coaches' poll and the AP Poll ranked USC number 1, but the BCS — which also gave consideration to computer rankings — ranked Oklahoma first, another one-loss team but one that had lost its own Big 12 Conference title game 35–7, with USC ranked third.

In the 2003 BCS National Championship Game, the Sugar Bowl, BCS No. 2 LSU defeated BCS No. 1 Oklahoma 21–14. Meanwhile, BCS No. 3 USC defeated BCS No. 4 Michigan 28–14 in the Rose Bowl. USC finished the season ranked No. 1 in the AP poll and was awarded the AP National Championship; LSU, however, won the BCS National Championship title for that year, prompting a split national title between LSU and USC. In the wake of the controversy, corporate sponsors emerged who were willing to organize an LSU-USC game to settle the matter; nevertheless, the NCAA refused to permit the matchup.

==== 2004 ====
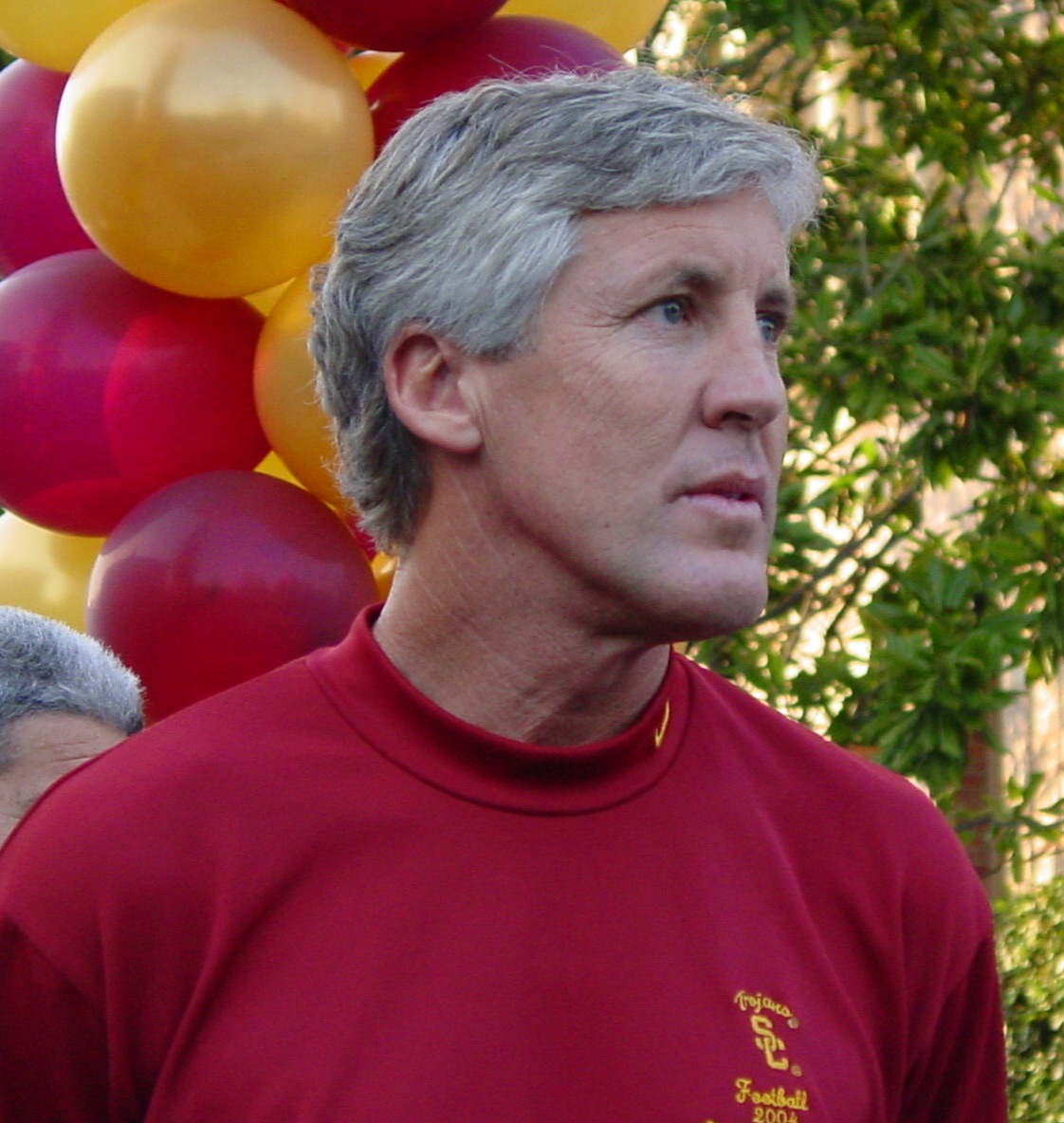
Pete Carroll at the USC 2004 national championship award rally

In 2004, USC was picked preseason No. 1 by the Associated Press, thanks to the return of Leinart as well as sophomore running backs LenDale White and Reggie Bush. The defense—led by All-American defensive tackles Shaun Cody and Mike Patterson, as well as All-American linebackers Lofa Tatupu and Matt Grootegoed—was considered to be among the finest in the nation. Key questions included the offensive line, with few returning starters, and the receiving corps, which had lost previous year's senior Keary Colbert and the breakout star of 2003, Mike Williams. Williams had tried to enter the NFL draft a year early during the Maurice Clarett trial when it was ruled that the NFL could not deny them entering the draft. The decision was appealed and overturned leaving Williams unable to enter the draft. When he applied to the NCAA for reinstatement of his eligibility, it was denied.

Despite close calls against Stanford and California, the Trojans finished the regular season undefeated and headed for the 2004 BCS Championship Game at the Orange Bowl. USC was the second team in NCAA football history to have gone wire-to-wire (ranked first place from preseason to postseason since the AP began releasing preseason rankings); the first was Florida State in 1999 (two other schools went wire-to-wire before the existence of preseason polls – Notre Dame in 1943 and Army in 1945). Quarterback Leinart won the Heisman Trophy, with running back Bush placing fifth in the vote tally. The Trojans' opponent in the Orange Bowl, Oklahoma, were themselves undefeated and captained by sixth-year quarterback Jason White, who had won the Heisman in 2003; the game marked the first time in NCAA history that two players who had already won the Heisman played against each other. Most analysts expected the game to be close—as USC matched its speed and defense against the Oklahoma running game and skilled offensive line—but the reality proved to be far different. USC scored 38 points in the first half, and won the BCS National Championship Game by the score of 55–19, making them the BCS Champions and earning the team the AP National Championship as well.

In June 2010, after a four-year investigation, the NCAA imposed sanctions against the Trojan football program for a "lack of institutional control," including a public reprimand and censure, a two-year postseason ban, a loss of 30 scholarships over three years, and vacating all games in which Bush participated as an ineligible player (14 wins, 1 loss), including the 2005 Orange Bowl, in which the Trojans won the BCS National Championship. These sanctions have been criticized by some NCAA football writers, including ESPN's Ted Miller, who wrote, "It's become an accepted fact among informed college football observers that the NCAA sanctions against USC were a travesty of justice, and the NCAA's refusal to revisit that travesty are a massive act of cowardice on the part of the organization."

Following the NCAA sanctions, BCS Executive Director Bill Hancock stated that a committee would decide whether to vacate USC's 2004 BCS Championship, but the final decision would be delayed until after the NCAA had heard USC's appeals against some of the sanctions. On July 20, 2010, incoming USC president Max Nikias stated that the school would remove jerseys and murals displayed in Bush's honor from its facilities, and would return the school's copy of Bush's Heisman Trophy. On September 14, Bush announced that he would forfeit the Heisman and return his copy of the trophy.

On May 26, 2011, the NCAA upheld all findings and penalties against USC. The team did not participate in the Pac-12 Football Championship Game or a bowl game during the 2011–12 season. The BCS announced June 6, 2011, that it had stripped USC of the 2004 title, but the Associated Press still recognizes USC as the 2004 AP National Champion.

==== 2005 ====
The 2005 regular season witnessed a resuscitation of the rivalry with Notre Dame, after a last-second play in which senior quarterback Matt Leinart scored the winning touchdown with help from a controversial push from behind by running back Reggie Bush, nicknamed the "Bush Push". The year climaxed with a 66–19 USC defeat of cross-town rival UCLA. Bush finished his stellar year by winning the Heisman Trophy (later returned by USC and reclaimed by the Heisman Trophy Trust considering Bush accepted improper benefits while at USC and was ineligible during the 2005 season), while Leinart finished third in the Heisman voting. Several other players also earned accolades, being named All-Americans (AP, Football Coaches, Football Writers, Walter Camp, ESPN.com, SI.com, CBS Sportsline.com, Rivals.com, Collegefootballnews.com). These include QB Matt Leinart, RB Reggie Bush, RB LenDale White, S Darnell Bing, OT Taitusi Lutui, OT Sam Baker, WR Dwayne Jarrett, C Ryan Kalil, OG Fred Matua, and DE Lawrence Jackson. Additionally, OL Winston Justice did well enough to forgo his senior year and enter the NFL draft. The regular season ended with two clear-cut contenders facing off in the Rose Bowl to decide the national championship. Both USC and Texas were 12–0 entering the game; although USC was the slight favorite, USC lost to Texas 41–38.

As with the 2004 season, later NCAA investigations into alleged improper benefits given to Bush altered the official record of the 2005 Trojan season. All twelve wins from the 2005 season were officially vacated. Bush would eventually manage to have his USC statistics and 2005 Heisman Trophy reinstated. Despite this, anything which USC lost as a result of what the NCAA imposed against the team for the 2004 and 2005 seasons has still not been recovered, including a national title win.

==== 2006 ====
For the 2006 football season, USC tried to rebuild its strength following the loss of offensive stalwarts Leinart, Bush, and White, defensive leader Bing, and offensive linemen Matua, Justice, and Lutui. The Trojans developed their offense using unproven QB John David Booty and returning star receivers Dwayne Jarrett and Steve Smith along with second-year wide-out Patrick Turner. Mark Sanchez, the highly touted QB of the recruiting class of 2005 (Mission Viejo High School) was widely viewed as a dark horse to win the starting job from Booty, although Booty was named the starter at the end of fall training camp. The starting tailback position was initially a battle between returning players Chauncey Washington and Desmond Reed (both recovering from injuries) and heralded recruits Stafon Johnson (Dorsey High School in Los Angeles), C. J. Gable, Allen Bradford and Emmanuel Moody.

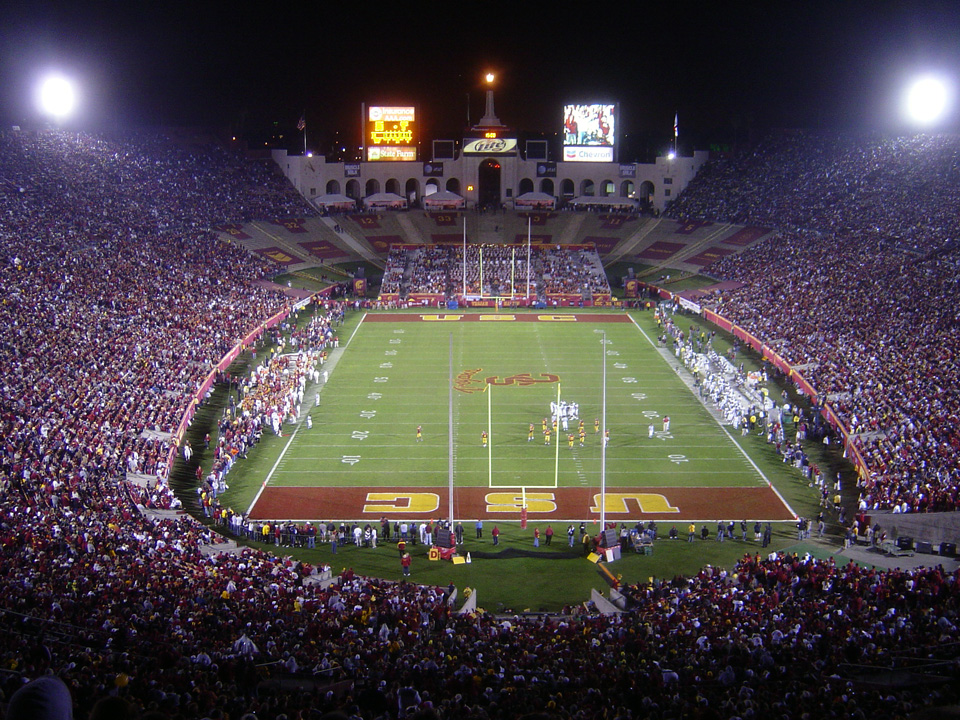
The Coliseum during a 2006 USC game

USC had many experienced players as well, including linebacker Dallas Sartz and wide receiver Chris McFoy, who had already graduated with their bachelor's degrees and were pursuing master's degrees. Fullback Brandon Hancock would have been part of that group as well until an injury ended his collegiate career. Additionally, fifth-year (redshirt) senior linebacker Oscar Lua, running back Ryan Powdrell and offensive lineman Kyle Williams were expected to either start or play frequently in 2006.

The 2006 Trojans came out strong, easily defending their top 10 status throughout the year. As the season progressed, USC began to display marked inconsistencies, as their margins of victory began to slip. The first setback proved to be a 31–33 loss to unranked Oregon State, in which the Beavers were able to repeatedly capitalize on several Trojan turnovers. Even though USC dropped initially in the polls, they worked their way back up. After defeating both Cal and Notre Dame, they held the number 2 spot heading into the final week of the season. The Trojans were considered to be a virtual lock for the BCS National Championship Game against Ohio State and just needed to beat UCLA. USC was shocked in the final game of the season, losing to crosstown rival UCLA 13–9. This eliminated the Trojans from championship contention and opened the door for Florida to become Ohio State's opponent. The Trojans did earn a Rose Bowl bid and defeated Michigan 32–18. It was the Trojans' fifth straight BCS Bowl appearance.

On January 6, 2007, six days after the Rose Bowl Game, USC kicker Mario Danelo was found dead at the bottom of the White Point Cliff near Point Fermin Lighthouse in San Pedro, California.

==== 2007 ====
In July 2007, ESPN.com named USC its No. 1 team of the decade for the period between 1996 and 2006, citing the Trojans' renaissance and dominance under Carroll.

The 2007 Trojans were the presumptive No. 1 pick before the season. However, they lost two games, including a major upset to 41-point underdog Stanford, and they did not get into the national championship game. However, the Trojans did win their sixth conference championship and defeated Illinois in the 2008 Rose Bowl Game.

Under Carroll, USC was known to attract numerous celebrities to its practices, including USC alumni Will Ferrell, George Lucas, LeVar Burton, and Sophia Bush as well as Snoop Dogg, Henry Winkler, Kirsten Dunst, Nick Lachey, Dr. Dre, Spike Lee, Alyssa Milano, Flea, Wilmer Valderrama, Jake Gyllenhaal and Andre 3000. The Trojans benefited from Los Angeles's lack of NFL teams (with the Los Angeles Rams and Raiders having left in the early 1990s), combined with the Trojans' 21st century success, leading them to sometimes be called LA's "de facto NFL team."

During Carroll's first eight years as head coach, USC lost only one game by more than seven points, a 27–16 loss at Notre Dame in his first season, until the second half of the 2009 season. The early part of the 2000s also saw the rise of USC football's popularity in the Los Angeles market: without any stadium expansions, USC broke its average home attendance record four times in a row: reaching 77,804 in 2003, 85,229 in 2004, 90,812 in 2005 and over 91,416 with one game to go in 2006 (the capacity of the Coliseum is 92,000).

==== 2008 ====
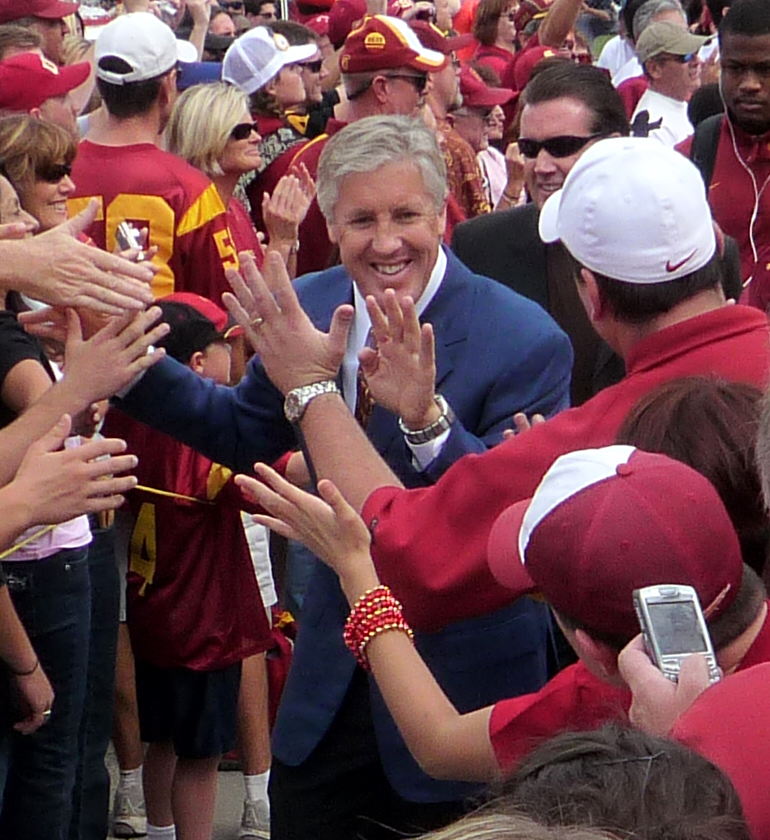
Coach Carroll at the pre-game "Trojan Walk"

After beating Penn State in the Rose Bowl, USC finished the season 12–1, and ranked No. 2 in the Coaches' Poll and No. 3 in the AP Poll. The 2008 season culminated in USC's seventh straight Pac-10 Championship, seventh straight BCS bowl appearance and seventh straight finish in the top 4 of the AP Poll. This also marked seven consecutive seasons where USC has not lost a game by more than 7 points. Their only loss was on the road against Oregon State, which was mentioned in the preseason as a possible upset.

==== 2009 ====
After beating Boston College in the Emerald Bowl, USC finished the season 9–4, and ranked No. 20 in the Coaches' Poll and No. 22 in the AP Poll. USC ended its seven-year streak of Pac-10 Championship, BCS bowl appearance and top 4 finish of the AP Poll. The Trojans started the season strong beating No. 8 Ohio State at The Horseshoe, but they would lose to four Pac-10 teams (Washington, Oregon, Stanford, and Arizona). Blowout losses to Oregon 47–20 and Stanford 55–21 marked a turning point in USC's season and sparked debate in the media about the future dominance of USC football. After the season concluded, head coach Pete Carroll resigned to accept a head coaching position with the Seattle Seahawks.

In 2009, USC was named "Team of the Decade" by both CBSSports.com and Football.com, as well as the "Program of the Decade" by SI.com, plus was No. 1 in CollegeFootballNews.com's "5-Year Program Rankings" and was ranked No. 2 in ESPN.com's "Prestige Rankings" among all schools since 1936 (behind Oklahoma). Additionally, in 2009, ESPN.com ranked USC the second-best program in college football history.

=== 2010s ===
==== 2010 ====
On January 12, 2010, Lane Kiffin was hired as the head coach. This came following Pete Carroll's departure from USC to become the head coach of the Seattle Seahawks.

In June 2010, after a prolonged four-year investigation into whether former USC running back Reggie Bush and his family had accepted financial benefits and housing from two sports agents in San Diego while he was a student athlete at USC, the NCAA imposed sanctions against the Trojan football program for a "lack of institutional control," including a two-year postseason ban, the loss of 30 scholarships over three years, and the vacation of all wins in which Bush participated as an "ineligible" player, including the 2005 Orange Bowl, in which the Trojans won the BCS National Championship. These sanctions have been criticized by many NCAA football writers, including ESPN's Ted Miller, who wrote, "It's become an accepted fact among informed college football observers that the NCAA sanctions against USC were a travesty of justice, and the NCAA's refusal to revisit that travesty are a massive act of cowardice on the part of the organization."

The 2010 team finished 8–5 (5–4 in the Pac-10) and was ineligible for post-season play.

==== 2011 ====
On February 9, 2010, Commissioner Larry Scott announced that the Pac-10 would be considering expanding to twelve schools. The Pac-10 Conference officially became the Pac-12 Conference following the addition of Colorado and Utah on July 1, 2011.

In 2011, although USC finished in first place in its conference division with a 7–2 record, due to their ineligibility to participate in a bowl game, the UCLA Bruins became champions of the inaugural Pac-12 South Division. In the final regular-season game, USC's 50–0 win over UCLA was the largest margin of victory in the rivalry since 1930.

The release of the December 4, 2011, final regular-season Associated Press college football poll marked USC's return to national prominence with the No. 5 ranking. The Trojans were not eligible for postseason play and did not participate in any Bowl game. When the final AP Football Poll was released, USC dropped one spot to the No. 6 ranking.

==== 2012 ====
USC was ranked number one in The Associated Press' preseason college football poll for the seventh time in school history and the first time in five seasons, edging out No. 2 Alabama and No. 3 LSU. However, the early season expectations would backfire as the Trojans would eventually finish 7–5 (5–4 versus Pac-12 opponents), including losses to all three of their major rivals (Notre Dame, UCLA, and Stanford) all in the same year for the first time since 1992. The team finished second in the Pac-12 South standings and unranked in any poll.

==== 2013 ====
The 2013 USC Trojans football team finished the season 10–4, 6–3 in Pac-12 play to finish in a tie for second place in the South Division. They were invited to the Las Vegas Bowl where they defeated Fresno State. Head coach Lane Kiffin, who was in his fourth year, was fired on September 29 after a 3–2 start to the season. He was replaced by interim head coach Ed Orgeron. At the end of the regular season, Washington head coach Steve Sarkisian was hired as the new head coach beginning in 2014. This prompted Orgeron to resign before the bowl game. Clay Helton led the Trojans in the Las Vegas Bowl.

==== 2014 ====
Steve Sarkisian, in his first year as head coach at USC, led the Trojans to a 9–4 season (6–3 in the Pac-12) to finish in a three-way tie for second place in the South Division. They were invited to the Holiday Bowl where they defeated Nebraska 45–42. On September 8, 2014, Sarkisian and athletic director Pat Haden were reprimanded by Pac-12 Conference commissioner Larry Scott for attempting "to influence the officiating, and ultimately the outcome of a contest" during the game against Stanford two days earlier.

==== 2015 ====
The 2015 season was a tumultuous one for the Trojans with a season record of 8–4 overall and 6–3 in Pac-12 play to finish as Pac-12 Southern Conference champions. Mid-season, coach Steve Sarkisian was fired to deal with personal issues, and Clay Helton was again named the interim head coach. ESPN later reported that Sarkisian came to a pre-practice meeting, appearing to be intoxicated. According to Scott Wolf, the USC beat writer for the Los Angeles Daily News, several players smelled alcohol on Sarkisian's breath.

The Trojans had lost to Stanford and Washington under Sarkisian. Under Helton, USC lost to Notre Dame, but then rallied to win the next four games. A loss to Oregon left the South Division conference championship to be decided by the USC–UCLA game; USC won 40–21. USC played in its first-ever Pac-12 Conference championship game, losing to Stanford (41–22) after the Cardinal (8–1 in Pac-12, 9–2 overall) locked up the North Division title, its third in four years, with its victory over California. USC went on to lose the 2015 Holiday Bowl 23–21 to the Wisconsin Badgers. Zach Banner started all 14 games at tackle, was First Team All-Pac-12, and won USC's Offensive Lineman of the Year Award after allowing only nine total pressures on 426 pass attempts, according to Pro Football Focus, which graded him as the season's top pass-blocking right tackle. On December 7, Sarkisian filed a $30 million termination lawsuit against USC.

==== 2016 ====
The 2016 USC Trojans football season marked Clay Helton's first full season as USC head coach. The team finished the season 10–3, (7–2 Pac-12), finishing as the runner-up of the South Division title and as Rose Bowl champions. After a 1–3 start during the month of September that featured losses to teams such as No. 1 Alabama, No. 7 Stanford, and No. 24 Utah, the Trojans began a nine-game winning streak to end their season. Some notable wins include victories over No. 21 Colorado, No. 4 Washington, and No. 5 Penn State in the Rose Bowl. Sam Darnold, a redshirt freshman quarterback, became the starter over Max Browne (1–2 record as starting QB) a few days before the Utah game. With that, the Trojans received much-needed stability after years of turmoil and coaching changes. The season was capped off with a dramatic 52–49 win in the Rose Bowl over Penn State, their first Rose Bowl victory in 8 years. USC finished No. 3 in the final AP polls for the season. Zach Banner, captain of the team, was again All-Pac-12 first-team, was CollegeSportsMadness.com All American first-team, Senior CLASS Award All-American first-team, Phil Steele All-Pac-12 first-team, a finalist for the Senior CLASS Award (given to the nation's top senior excelling in community/classroom/character/competition), and was the team's Co-Offensive Lineman of the Year.

==== 2017 ====
Entering the season, the Trojans were ranked No. 4 in the AP Poll's preseason rankings. They finished the season 11–3, 8–1 in Pac-12, to be champions of the South Division. They represented the South Division in the Pac-12 Championship Game where they defeated Stanford to become Pac-12 Champions. They were invited to play in the Cotton Bowl against Ohio State, but lost 24–7. In the final AP poll, they were ranked No. 12.

Notable players to depart to the NFL include Sam Darnold and Ronald Jones II. Darnold is the 5th USC quarterback to be drafted in the first round of the NFL since 1967.

==== 2018 ====
Though ranked No. 15 in the AP Poll's preseason rankings, the Trojans finished the season 5–7, (4–5 Pac-12), the program's first losing record since 2000 where they held the same record. USC lost to both of its major rivals, UCLA and Notre Dame, in the same season for the first time since 2013, and it also lost to all other California Pac-12 schools (UCLA, California, and Stanford) in the same season for the first time since 1996. They tied Arizona for third place in the Pac-12 South Division.

On November 25, USC athletic director Lynn Swann announced that head coach Clay Helton would return in 2019.

==== 2019 ====
The Trojans finished the regular season 8–4, (7–2 Pac-12), holding second place in the Pac-12's South Division. USC was 2–3 against ranked teams. Following the regular season, they lost to Iowa in the Holiday Bowl 24–49.

=== 2020s ===
==== 2020 ====
On September 24, the conference announced that a six-game conference-only season would begin on November 6 with the conference's championship game to be played on December 18 after initially announcing in August that all fall sports competitions were cancelled due to the COVID-19 pandemic. Teams not selected for the championship game would be seeded to play a seventh game.

The Trojans finished the regular season with a 5–0 record, and qualified for the Pac-12 Championship Game, which they lost to Oregon 24–31. The following day, USC announced that it would not play in any bowl game, ending the season with an overall 5–1 record.

==== 2021 ====
The Trojans were led by sixth-year head coach Clay Helton in the first two games. Helton was subsequently fired on September 13 following the team's 42–28 loss to Stanford. Associate head coach Donte Williams took over as the team's interim head coach. They finished the 2021 season with 4–8, their worst record since 1991 where they went 3–8. They were not bowl eligible for the second time in 4 years (they were not bowl eligible the 2018 season after finishing with a 5–7 record).

==== 2022 ====
On November 28, 2021, Lincoln Riley was named the 30th head coach coming off of a five year stint at Oklahoma. First-year offensive coordinator Josh Henson and first-year defensive coordinator Alex Grinch both intended to coach alongside him for the season. As of February 28, USC's recruiting class was ranked 65th among NCAA D1 schools. A notable incoming transfer was Oklahoma QB Caleb Williams, who reunited with Riley. The Trojans went on to improve dramatically over their 2021 season, going from finishing 4–8, to 10–1, and being ranked #5 in the AP poll as of Week 12. During Riley's inaugural season, the Trojans racked up wins against Rice 66–14, Stanford 41–28, Fresno State 45–17, Oregon State 17–14, Arizona State 42–25, and Washington State 30–14 before losing a close match to #20 ranked Utah 43–42. After this setback, the Trojans would bounce back and go on to beat Arizona 45–37, California 41–35, Colorado 55–17, and #16 ranked UCLA 48–45, clinching them a spot in the Pac-12 Championship.

==== 2023 ====
USC football started their last year in the Pac-12 ranked #6 in the pre-season AP Poll. The team, under the coaching guidance of Lincoln Riley, and with the second year of on field leadership by quarterback Caleb Williams won four games (San Jose State, Nevada, Stanford, and Arizona State) by impressive margins with over 40 offensive points on the board resulting in a bump in the polls to #5.

USC won its next two games against Colorado and Arizona, scoring 40 offensive points. But the winning margins were squashed to only 7 and 2 points, respectively, with the Trojans' 43-41 3OT win against Arizona on October 7, 2023. These close results dropped USC's ranking to #10. USC lost five of its six next games, ending the season outside the top 25 with an overall record of 7-5 and a conference record of 5-4.

Entering the season, Williams was the favorite to win the Heisman Trophy for the second year in a row, but after a disappointing second half of the season, he was eliminated from contention leading into the December ceremony.

USC played #16 Louisville in the 2023 Holiday Bowl without Williams, who instead turned his focus to the NFL draft. The Trojans ended up winning the game 42–28, with Miller Moss throwing a record 6 touchdown passes in the process.

== Conference affiliations ==
- Independent (1888–1921)
- Pac-12 Conference (1922–2023)
  - Pacific Coast Conference (1922–1958)
  - Athletic Association of Western Universities (1959–1967)
  - Pacific-8 Conference (1968–1977)
  - Pacific-10 Conference (1978–2010)
  - Pac-12 Conference (2011–2023)
- Big Ten Conference (2024–present)

== Championships ==
=== National championships ===
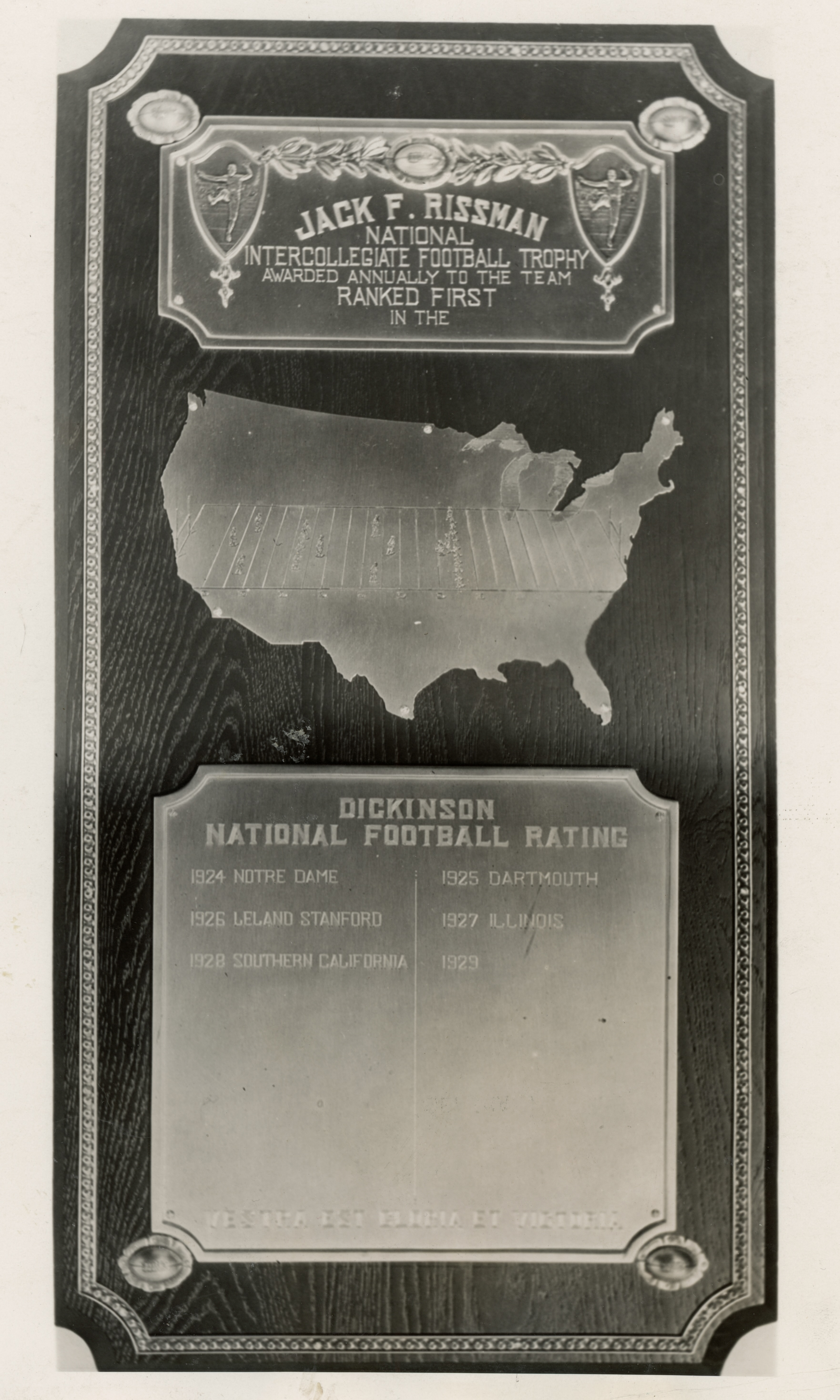
Jack F. Rissman Trophy awarded to Southern California for 1928 as Dickinson System national champions.

USC has won 17 national championships from NCAA-designated major selectors. USC claims 11 national championships, including 7 from the major wire-service: AP Poll and/or Coaches' Poll.

Two of USC's championships, 1928 and 1939, are based on the Dickinson System, a formula devised by a University of Illinois professor that awarded national championships between 1926 and 1940. The Dickinson System is cited in the Official 2010 NCAA FBS Record Book as a legitimate national title selector. USC's claim is consistent with other FBS programs that won the Dickinson title. In 2004, USC recognized the 1939 squad as one of their national championship teams. The 2004 team was forced to vacate the final two games of its season, including the 2005 Orange Bowl due to NCAA sanctions incurred as a result of loss of institutional control, and namely, in connection with Reggie Bush. USC appealed the sanctions, delaying consideration of vacating USC's 2004 championship by the BCS. Ultimately, USC lost the appeals and forfeited the 2004 BCS championship. The AP did not vacate its 2004 championship, hence the Trojans retain a share of the national title.

Year	Coach	Selectors	Record	Bowl	Final AP	Final Coaches
1928	Howard Jones	Dickinson System, Sagarin	9–0–1	–	–	–
1931	Howard Jones	Berryman, Billingsley, Boand, Dickinson, Dunkel, Helms, Houlgate, Football Research, NCF, Poling, Sagarin, Sagarin (ELOChess), Williamson	10–1	Won Rose	–	–
1932	Howard Jones	Berryman, Billingsley, Boand, Dunkel, Football Research, Helms, Houlgate, NCF, Parke Davis, Poling, Sagarin, Williamson	10–0	Won Rose	–	–
1939	Howard Jones	Dickinson	8–0–2	Won Rose	No. 3	–
1962	John McKay	AP, Berryman, DeVold, Dunkel, FB News, Football Research, FWAA, Helms, NCF, NFF, Poling, UPI (coaches), Williamson	11–0	Won Rose	No. 1	No. 1
1967	John McKay	AP, Berryman, Billingsley, DeVold, FB News, Football Research, FW, Helms, Matthews, NCF, NFF, Sagarin, Sagarin (ELO-Chess), UPI (coaches)	10–1	Won Rose	No. 1	No. 1
1972	John McKay	AP, Berryman, Billingsley, DeVold, Dunkel, FACT, FB News, Football Research, FW, Helms, Litkenhous, Matthews, NCF, NFF, Poling, Sagarin, Sagarin (ELO-Chess), UPI (coaches)	12–0	Won Rose	No. 1	No. 1
1974	John McKay	FW, Helms, NCF, NFF, UPI (coaches)	10–1–1	Won Rose	No. 2	No. 1
1978	John Robinson	Berryman, Billingsley, FACT, FB News, Helms, NCF, Sagarin (ELO-Chess), Sporting News, UPI (coaches)	12–1	Won Rose	No. 2	No. 1
2003	Pete Carroll	AP, CCR, Eck, FW, Matthews, NY Times, Sporting News	12–1	Won Rose	No. 1	No. 2
2004	Pete Carroll	Anderson & Hester, AP, Berryman, Billingsley, CCR, Colley Matrix, DeVold, Dunkel, Eck, Massey, Matthews, NFF, NY Times, Rothman, Sporting News, Sagarin, Williamson; Vacated †: BCS, FWAA, USA Today/ESPN (coaches)	13–0 †	Won Orange Bowl (BCS National Championship Game) †	No. 1	†

^Claimed national championships - USC claims the 1928, 1931, 1932, 1939, 1962, 1967, 1972, 1974, 1978, 2003, and 2004 championships.

† The FWAA stripped USC of its 2004 Grantland Rice Trophy and vacated the selection of its national champion for 2004. The BCS also vacated USC's participation in the 2005 Orange Bowl and USC's 2004 BCS National Championship, and the AFCA Coaches' Poll Trophy was returned. In addition to the Orange Bowl victory over Oklahoma, the 2004 regular season finale win against UCLA was also vacated, making the official record of 2004 USC Trojans 11-0.

=== Conference championships ===
USC has won 39 conference championships, all within the Pac-12 Conference or its predecessors. The 2004 and 2005 championships were vacated.

- 1927†, 1928, 1929†, 1931, 1932, 1938†, 1939, 1943, 1944, 1945, 1947, 1952, 1959†, 1962, 1964†, 1966, 1967, 1968, 1969, 1972, 1973, 1974, 1976, 1978, 1979, 1984, 1987†, 1988, 1989, 1993†, 1995†, 2002†, 2003, 2004^, 2005^, 2006†, 2007†, 2008, 2017

† Co-championship

^ Vacated due to NCAA penalty

=== Division championships ===
USC has won 4 division championships, all in the South division of the Pac-12.

Season	Division	Coach	Opponent	CG result
2015†	Pac-12 South	Steve Sarkisian / Clay Helton	Stanford	L 22–41
2017	Pac-12 South	Clay Helton	Stanford	W 31–28
2020	Pac-12 South	Clay Helton	Oregon	L 24–31
2022	Pac-12 South	Lincoln Riley	Utah	L 24–47

† Co-championship

== Bowl games ==
USC has a bowl game record of 36–20 through the 2024 season. The Trojans appeared in 34 Rose Bowls, winning 25, both records for the bowl. These are also the most times a team has appeared in or won any bowl game. USC was banned from entering a bowl during either the 2010 or 2011 seasons as part of the extremely extensive sanctions resulting from the University of Southern California athletics scandal. Below is the list of USC's ten most recent bowl appearances.

USC's last 10 bowl games
Bowl	Score	Date	Season	Opponent	Stadium	Location	Attendance	Head coach
Las Vegas Bowl	W 45–20	December 21, 2013	2013	Fresno State	Sam Boyd Stadium	Las Vegas, NV	42,178	Clay Helton
Holiday Bowl	W 45–42	December 27, 2014	2014	Nebraska	Qualcomm Stadium	San Diego, CA	55,789	Steve Sarkisian
Holiday Bowl	L 21–23	December 30, 2015	2015	Wisconsin	Qualcomm Stadium	San Diego, CA	48,329	Clay Helton
Rose Bowl	W 52–49	January 2, 2017	2016	Penn State	Rose Bowl	Pasadena, CA	95,128	Clay Helton
Cotton Bowl Classic	L 7–24	December 29, 2017	2017	Ohio State	AT&T Stadium	Arlington, TX	67,510	Clay Helton
Holiday Bowl	L 24–49	December 27, 2019	2019	Iowa	SDCCU Stadium	San Diego, CA	50,123	Clay Helton
Cotton Bowl Classic	L 45–46	January 2, 2023	2022	Tulane	AT&T Stadium	Arlington, TX	55,329	Lincoln Riley
Holiday Bowl	W 42–28	December 27, 2023	2023	Louisville	Petco Park	San Diego, CA	35,317	Lincoln Riley
Las Vegas Bowl	W 35–31	December 27, 2024	2024	Texas A&M	Allegiant Stadium	Paradise, NV	26,671	Lincoln Riley
Alamo Bowl	L 27–30 OT	December 30, 2025	2025	TCU	Alamodome	San Antonio, TX	54,571	Lincoln Riley

== Head coaches ==
USC head coaches from 1888 to present.

No.	Coach	Years	Seasons	Record
1, 2	Henry H. Goddard & Frank H. Suffel	1888	1	2–0
	No coach	1889, 1891–1896	7	7–7–1
3	Lewis R. Freeman	1897	1	5–1
	No coach	1898–1900	3	8–5–3
4	Clair S. Tappaan	1901	1	0–1
5	John Walker	1903	1	4–2
6	Harvey Holmes	1904–1907	4	19–5–3
7	William I. Traeger	1908	1	3–1–1
8, 10	Dean Cromwell	1909–1910, 1916–1918	5	21–8–6
9	Ralph Glaze	1914–1915	2	7–7
11	Gus Henderson	1919–1924	6	45–7
12	Howard Jones	1925–1940	16	121–36–13
13	Sam Barry	1941	1	2–6–1
14	Jeff Cravath	1942–1950	9	54–28–8
15	Jess Hill	1951–1956	6	45–17–1
16	Don Clark	1957–1959	3	13–16–1
17	John McKay	1960–1975	16	127–40–8
18, 21	John Robinson	1976–1982, 1993–1997	12	104–35–4
19	Ted Tollner	1983–1986	4	26–20–1
20	Larry Smith	1987–1992	6	44–25–3
22	Paul Hackett	1998–2000	3	19–18
23	Pete Carroll	2001–2009	9	83–18 †
24	Lane Kiffin	2010–2013	4	28–15
25	Ed Orgeron	2013	1	6–2
26, 28	Clay Helton	2013 (bowl), 2015–2021	8	46–24
27	Steve Sarkisian	2014–2015	2	12–6
29	Donte Williams	2021	1	4–8
30	Lincoln Riley	2022–present	4	26–14

† Does not include 14 wins and 1 loss vacated due to NCAA penalty
In 2013, Kiffin was fired after first 5 games, Orgeron served as interim head coach for next 8 games before resigning and Helton was interim head coach for bowl game. In 2015, Sarkisian was fired after first 5 games and Helton was interim head coach for next 7 games before becoming permanent head coach. In 2021, Helton was fired after first 2 games and Williams will serve as interim head coach for next 10 games.

=== Coaching staff ===
USC Trojans
Name	Position	Consecutive season at USC in current position	Previous position
Luke Huard	Offensive coordinator / offensive line	1st	Texas A&M – Offensive line (2019–2021)
Gary Patterson	Defensive coordinator	1st	TBA
Dennis Simmons	Assistant head coach/passing game coordinator/wide receivers	3rd	Oklahoma – Assistant head coach / passing game coordinator / outside receivers (2021)
Luke Huard	Interim inside wide receivers	3rd	Texas A&M – Offensive analyst (2019–2021)
Anthony Jones Jr	Running backs	1st	TCU – Running backs (2022–2023)
Zach Hanson	Tight ends	3rd	Tulsa – Offensive line (2020–2021)
Eric Henderson	Co-Defensive coordinator/run game coordinator/defensive line	1st	Los Angeles Rams - Defensive Line (2021–2023)
Rob Ryan	Assistant head coach for defense/linebackers	1st	Las Vegas Raiders – (2022–2024)
Shaun Nua	Defensive Ends	3rd	Michigan – Defensive line (2019–2021)
Doug Belk	secondary	1st	University of Houston – Defensive coordinator (2021-2023)
Bennie Wylie	Director of football sports performance	3rd	Oklahoma – Director of sports performance (2018–2021)

== Traditions ==
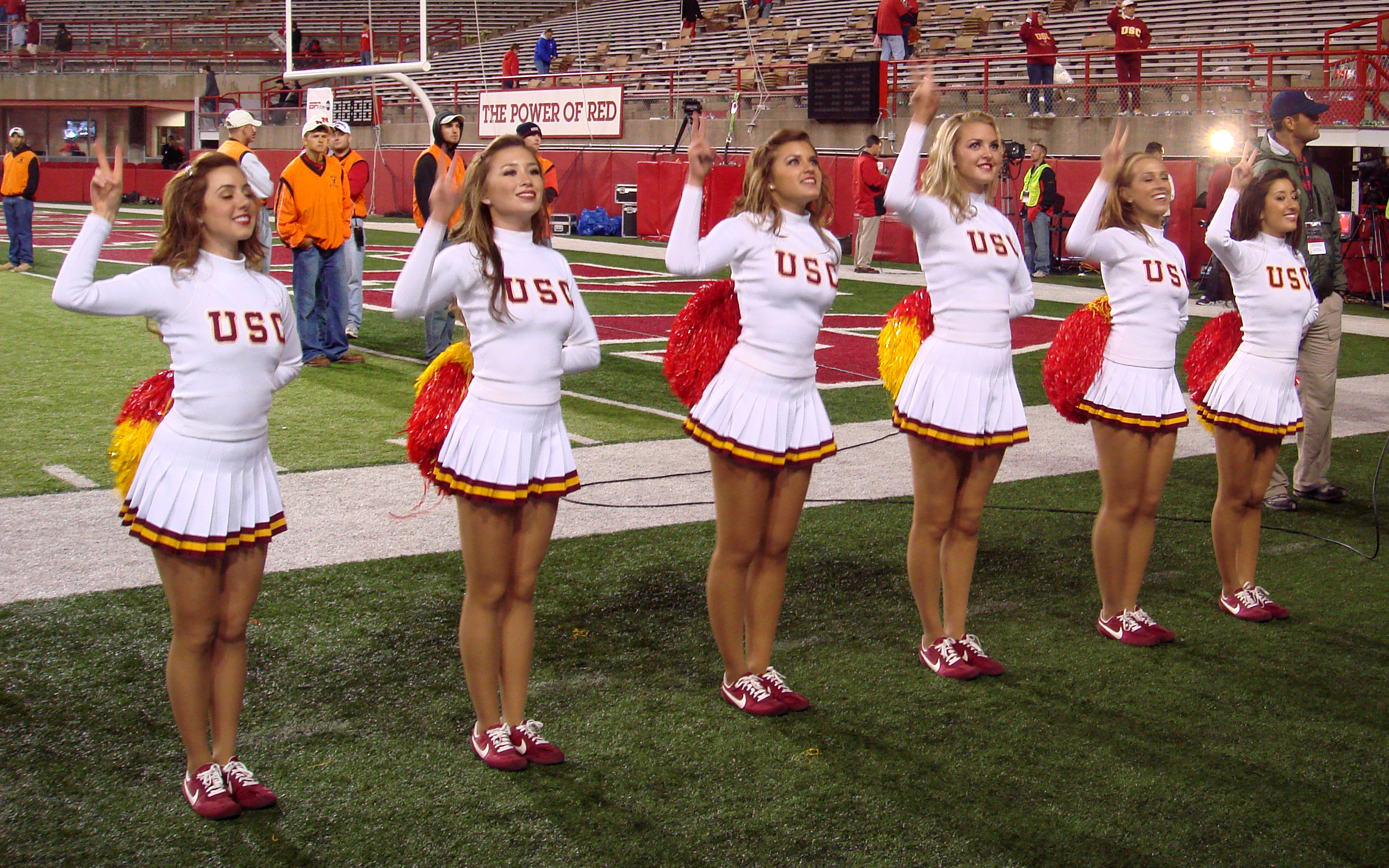
The USC Song Girls are making the traditional "V"-for-victory hand sign

=== Tailback U ===
USC is sometimes called "Tailback U" (Tailback University) because a number of running backs who played for the Trojans won the Heisman Trophy. These running backs include Mike Garrett (1965), O. J. Simpson (1968), Charles White (1979), Marcus Allen (1981), and Reggie Bush (2005).

=== "Fight On" ===
"Fight On" is the fight song of the USC Trojans. The term "Fight On" is also used as a battle cry, often with the two finger "V" salute for Victory given in accompaniment. The V gesture has its origins with the ancient Trojans, who would cut off the index and middle finger of soldiers they conquered so the conquered could no longer wield a sword in battle.

=== Jersey No. 55 ===
"Tradition surrounds certain numbers at USC, most notably 55," wrote Gary Klein of the Los Angeles Times. "Junior Seau, Willie McGinest, Chris Claiborne and Keith Rivers," he added, "are among the linebackers who have worn a number that Trojans coaches have been careful to distribute." Wrote Andy Kamenetzky of ESPN.com in an article titled "Tradition of elite linebackers alive in 55," "Membership, along with the hallowed No. 55 jersey, has been offered to a select few over the past few decades. Names such as Junior Seau. Keith Rivers. Willie McGinest. Chris Claiborne. Names forever etched in USC lore."

== Rivalries ==
In the first 30 years of USC football, the school maintained rivalries with local Southern California schools like Occidental and Pomona, but these ended by the 1920s when USC joined the PCC and grew into a national caliber team.

=== "Perfect Day" ===
A "Perfect Day" (a phrase created by the school's football announcer Pete Arbogast) to any USC fan is a USC win coupled with losses by UCLA and Notre Dame. There have been 66 "Perfect Days" since the first one occurred in 1921. Perfect Days have been possible since 1919 when UCLA began playing football.

The most recent Perfect Day occurred on September 13, 2025, when USC defeated Purdue, UCLA lost to New Mexico, and Notre Dame lost to Texas A&M.

=== Cal ===
USC has a rivalry with California. While not as significant as the Stanford or UCLA rivalries, for either school, USC and Cal played an annual game, and met more than 100 times. The game was often called The Weekender, referring to the weekend trip to the Bay Area; although, this term also applied to the Stanford game, as each series (USC/Cal and USC/Stanford) would alternate home and away. As of the 2023 season, USC had played Cal more than any other opponent, with the 2023 game marking the 112th meeting, according to Cal, and the 108th meeting according to USC, with discrepancies in the game record before 1920. The last Weekender was played on October 28, 2023, with Cal losing to USC 49-50. USC's record in the series was 72-32-4, as of 2023. In 2024, USC joined the Big Ten Conference while Cal joined the Atlantic Coast Conference. This put the rivalry between the Bears and Trojans on hiatus with no future meetings scheduled as of March 2024.

=== Notre Dame ===
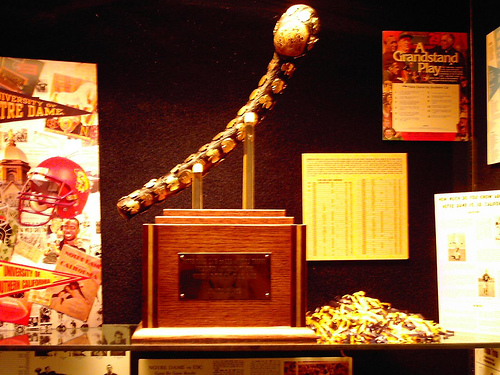
The first Jeweled Shillelagh

USC plays Notre Dame each year, with the winner keeping the Jeweled Shillelagh. The inter-sectional game has featured more national championship teams, Heisman trophy winners, All-Americans, and future NFL hall-of-famers than any other collegiate match-up. The two schools have played the game annually since 1926 (except for the years 1943–1945 when World War II travel restrictions kept the game from being played or 2020 due to the COVID-19 pandemic). Unlike most rivalry games, the game enjoys neither the possibility of acquiring regional "bragging rights" nor the import of intra-league play. The game has been referred to as the greatest inter-sectional rivalry in college football. Notre Dame leads the series 53–37–5 through the 2025 season.

=== Stanford ===
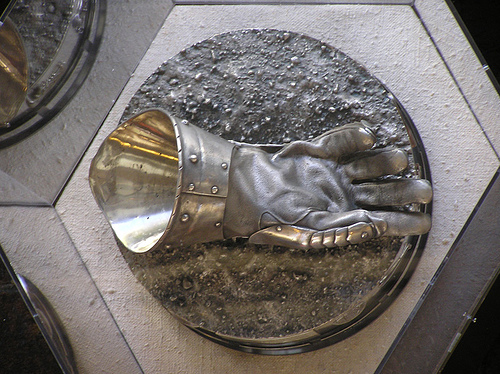
USC-UCLA Lexus Gauntlet.

Stanford is USC's oldest rival, in a series that dates to 1905. In the early years of football on the West Coast, the power sat in the Bay Area with the Stanford-Cal rivalry and USC rose to challenge the two established programs. During the early and mid-20th century Stanford football occasionally enjoyed periods of great regional success on the gridiron. USC and Stanford, being the two private universities with major football teams on the west coast, naturally drew the ire of one another. During the early 2000s, however, Stanford had not maintained their earlier success and the rivalry had faded to many USC fans.

Stanford and USC were the only private schools in the Pacific Coast Conference and its successors (AAWU/Pac-8/Pac-10/Pac-12).

The rivalry was renewed with the arrival of Jim Harbaugh at Stanford in 2007. Harbaugh defeated Carroll 2–1 in their three matchups with both victories occurring in the Coliseum. In the 2009 meeting, USC sustained their worst loss in 43 years and surrendered the most points to an opponent, a record that would stand for three seasons. The game led the Los Angeles Times to declare that Stanford was "at the top of the USC 'Must Kill' list." Harbaugh added another win in 2010 against Carroll's successor Lane Kiffin before leaving after that season to become head coach of the San Francisco 49ers.

The series became inactive following the 2023 season when USC left the Pac-12 for the Big Ten and Stanford departed for the Atlantic Coast Conference.

USC leads the series 65–34–3 through the 2023 season.

=== UCLA ===
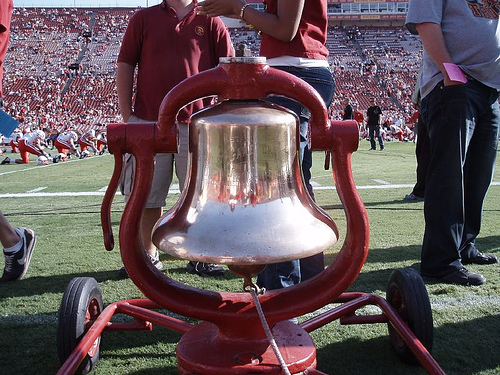
USC in possession of the Victory Bell.

USC's rivalry with UCLA is unusual in that they are one of a few pairs of Division I FBS programs that share a major city, as well as conference. Both are located within the Los Angeles city limits, approximately 10 miles (16 km) apart. Until 1982, the two schools also shared the same stadium: the Los Angeles Memorial Coliseum.

The crosstown rivals play each year for city bragging rights and the Victory Bell; and often for the right to go to the Rose Bowl as representative for the Pac-12. The UCLA rivalry tends to draw the focus of student supporters since many USC students have friends or family members attending "that other school" (of course, many UCLA students refer to their USC friends in the same manner) and many Southern California families are divided between Trojan Cardinal and Bruin Blue. The annual matchup always has both teams wearing their traditional home uniforms, featuring a Cardinal vs Blue matchup. USC leads the all-time series 52–34–7 through the 2025 season.

=== Oregon ===
While typically, the rivalry USC has with Oregon is less prominent than the school's other rivalries, a rivalry has formed in recent years. Back before the early 90s, USC and Oregon games were typical games; however, a competitive rivalry has formed between both schools.

This rivalry had been fought in the Pac-10, which then grew into the "Legacy" Pac-12, playing games against each other that would decide who went to, and sometimes who won the conference. It has been described as, "Perhaps one of the best new rivalries in college football" by journalists such as Chris Anderson, of the Bleacher Report.. With USC's invite to the Big 10, and Oregon's invite coming over a year later, the rivalry was set to be renewed in 2025, a season which saw USC falling to Oregon 42-27, in a competitive game, despite late game touchdowns that put the game out of reach.

== Facilities ==
=== Early facilities ===
Prior to the construction of the Los Angeles Memorial Coliseum in 1923, the Trojans played football in a number of facilities. Before 1893, the Trojans played football in a vacant lot on Jefferson Boulevard before the lot was developed as residences. In the 1890s, USC's primary home field was Athletic Park. Several games in the 1890s and all games in 1916 were played in Fiesta Park in downtown Los Angeles. The 1900 homestand was played at Chutes Park, a facility located within a Los Angeles pleasure park shared with the Los Angeles Angels baseball team, while the 1903 season was played at nearby Prager Park. Three games in the 1910s were played at Washington Park, the successor to Chutes Park. From 1904 to 1910, 1914–15, and 1917–22, most of USC's home games were played at the on-campus Bovard Field. USC also played home games in Pasadena, at Sportsman's Park, Tournament Park, and the Rose Bowl.

=== Los Angeles Memorial Coliseum ===
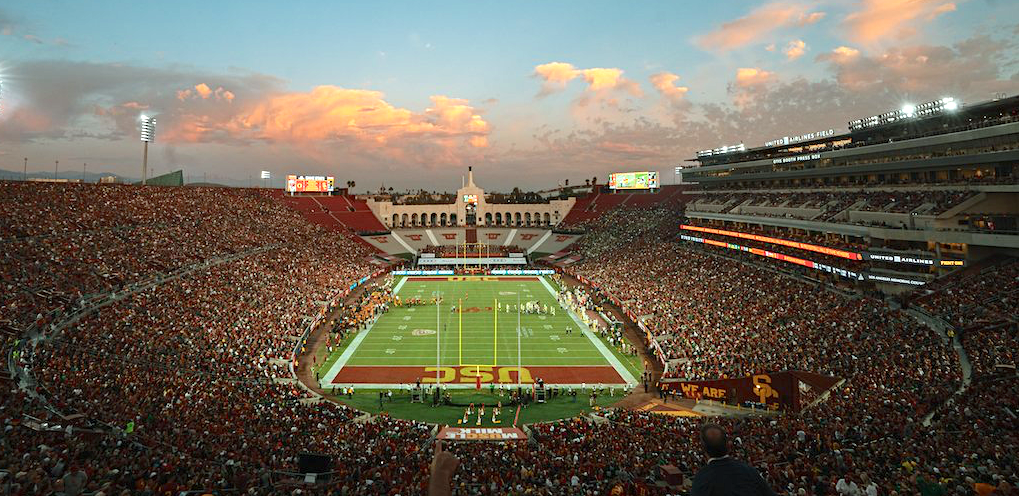
Los Angeles Memorial Coliseum in 2019

The Los Angeles Memorial Coliseum is one of the largest stadiums in the United States. USC has played football in the Coliseum ever since the grand stadium was built in 1923. In fact, the Trojans played in the first varsity football game ever held there (beating Pomona College 23–7 on October 6, 1923).

The Coliseum hosted the opening and closing ceremonies and track events of the 1932 and 1984 Summer Olympics, and is slated to be a venue for the 2028 Summer Olympics. Over the years, the Coliseum has been home to many sports teams besides the Trojans, including UCLA football, the NFL's Los Angeles Rams and Raiders, the Los Angeles Chargers in 1960 of the AFL, and Los Angeles Dodgers baseball, including the 1959 World Series. The Coliseum has hosted various other events, from concerts and speeches to track meets and motorcycle races. The Coliseum is located on 17 acres (69,000 m^{2}) in Exposition Park, which also houses museums, gardens and Banc of California Stadium. It has also earned the nickname, “The Grand Old Lady.”

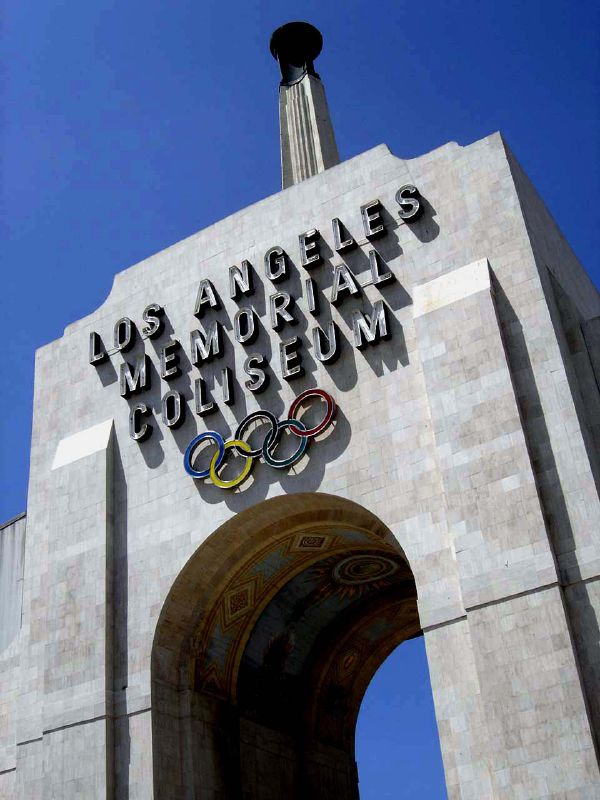
The peristyle and Olympic Torch of the Coliseum

The Coliseum is both managed and operated by USC under a master lease agreement with the LA Memorial Coliseum Commission, as was the Los Angeles Memorial Sports Arena for a number of years prior to its 2016 demolition. The Coliseum has a present full-capacity of 77,500 seats after USC completed a major $315 million renovation of the stadium in 2019 that added a new seven-story Tower on the stadium’s south side housing luxury suites, loge boxes, club seats, a new concourse with concession stands, a new press box, and rooftop club lounge.

=== The John McKay Center at USC ===
Opened in 2012, the $70 Million, 110,000-square-foot athletic and academic center named after legendary football coach John McKay was the home to the USC Trojan Football Department before it moved to the new Bloom Football Performance Center in August 2026. The building now houses meeting rooms, coaches' offices and a locker room for the other USC sports programs, as well as the Stevens Academic Center (including space for tutoring, counseling, study and computer rooms for student-athletes), a weight room, an athletic training room and a state-of-the-art digital media production facility for all of USC's 21 sports.

The centerpiece of the McKay Center is the two-story video board in the Parker Hughes atrium, which can display six big-screen televisions at once as well as promotional videos and graphics. The building's 60,000-square-foot basement includes a weight room, athletic training room, locker rooms and a players lounge, a 25,000-square-foot ground floor with Student-Athlete Academic Services center, a reception area and outdoor courtyard, and a 25,000-square-foot second floor with coaches' offices, team meeting rooms, outdoor patio and a state-of-the-art video production facility. The John McKay Center is adjacent to Heritage Hall, the Galen Dining Center, Brittingham Field, and the Bloom Football Performance Center.

=== Howard Jones Field/Brian Kennedy Field ===
The USC football team practices on campus at Howard Jones Field/Brian Kennedy Field. The facility originally known as Howard Jones Field was expanded in the fall of 1998 to include Brian Kennedy Field. In early 1999, Goux's Gate, named for the player and popular long-time assistant coach Marv Goux, was erected at the entrance to the practice field.

=== Bloom Football Performance Center ===
Field View of the USC Bloom Football Performance Center in August 2026

In June 2023, then USC President Carl Folt announced that USC football would receive a new performance center that includes three levels dedicated to football team operations. The new 165,000 square foot building was constructed on the site of the Brian Kennedy Field and includes two adjacent full-length outdoor practice fields – one turf and one natural grass (90,000 square feet) – which players will access directly from the performance center and its three-story building. It features student-athlete-centric spaces – including a new locker room, multiple player lounges, a recovery hub, nutritional support, sports sciences services, a weight room, a training room and an equipment room a team auditorium, position meeting rooms, recruiting areas, staff offices, a rooftop hospitality deck, and flexible space for future growth. Construction on the $225 million center began in 2024 and was completed in July 2026.

== Individual award winners ==
Individual players have won numerous accolades with seven officially recognized Heisman Trophy winners, 38 College Football Hall of Fame inductees, and 157 All-Americans. USC's first consensus All-American was offensive guard Brice Taylor in 1925, who notably excelled despite missing his left hand, and who was one of USC's first black players.

=== Heisman Trophy winners and retired numbers ===
Eight USC players have been awarded the Heisman Trophy. All of them have also had their numbers retired by the Trojans. In 2010, Bush's Heisman was forfeited after an NCAA investigation ruled him ineligible to participate as a student-athlete during his Trophy season. In 2024, Bush's Heisman was reinstated and his number retired.

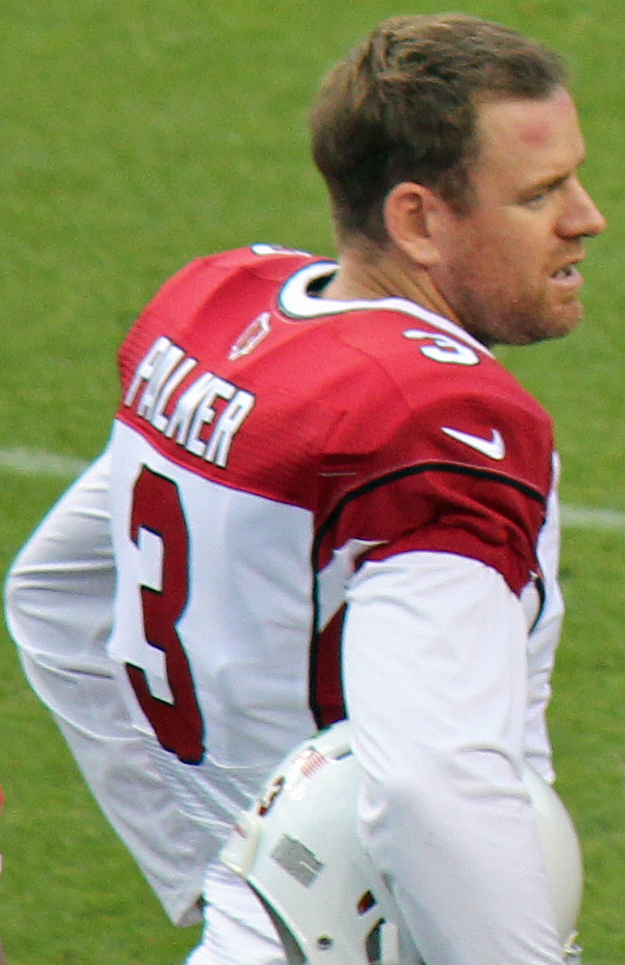
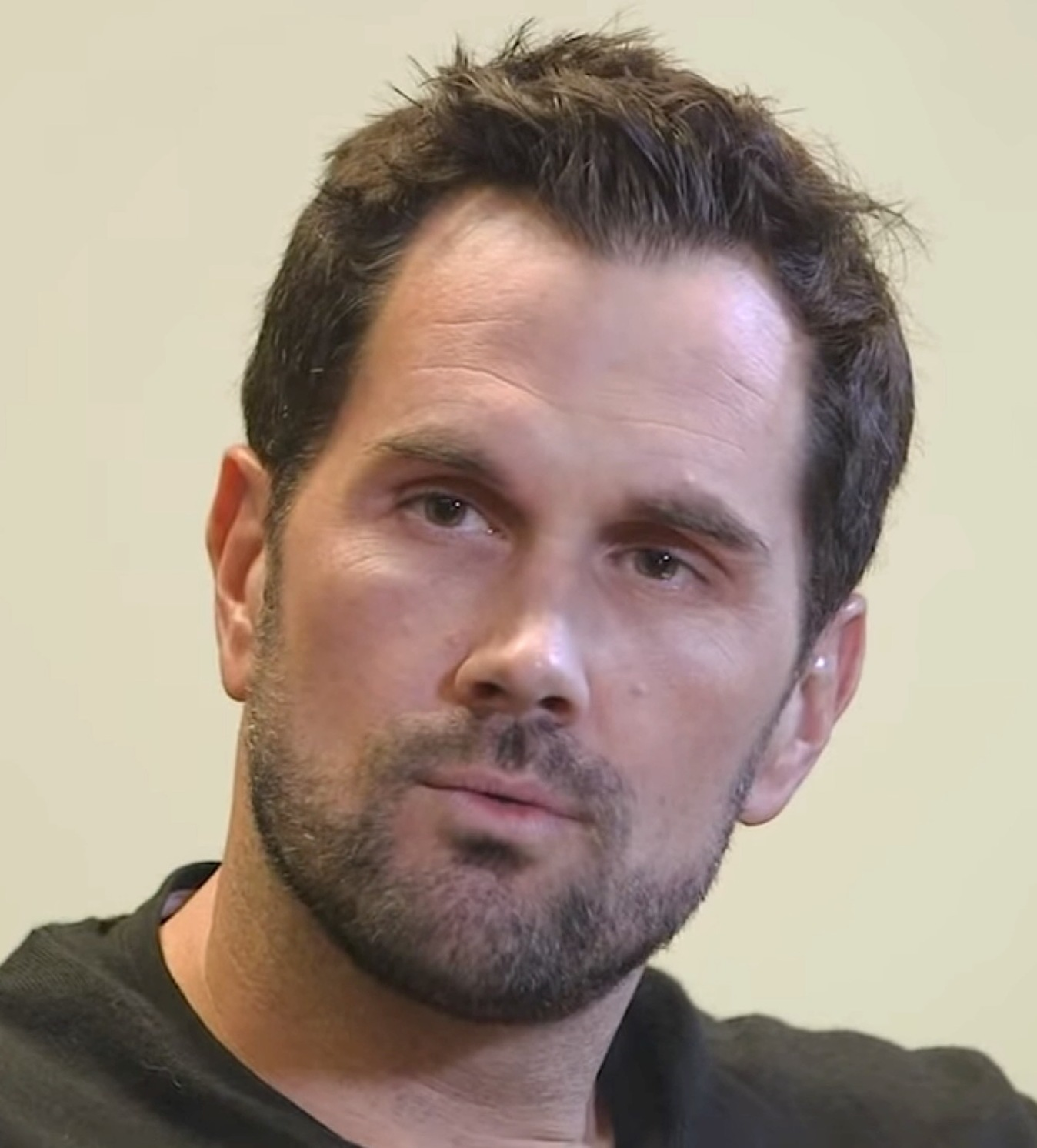
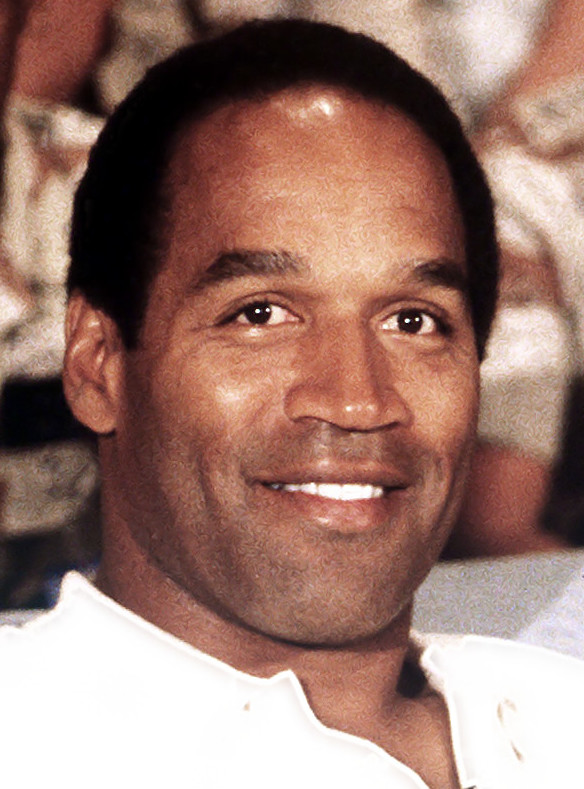
Left to right: Palmer, Leinart and Simpson, some of the Heisman Trophy winners who also have their numbers retired by USC.

USC Trojans Heisman Trophy winners and retired numbers
No.	Player	Pos.	Tenure	No. ret.	Ref.
3	Carson Palmer	QB	1999–2002	2002	
5	Reggie Bush	RB	2001–2005	2024	
11	Matt Leinart	QB	2001–2005	2004	
12	Charles White	RB	1977–1979	1979	
13	Caleb Williams	QB	2022–2023	2024	
20	Mike Garrett	RB	1963–1965	1965	
32	O. J. Simpson	RB	1967–1968	1968	
33	Marcus Allen	RB	1978–1981	1981	

=== Heisman Trophy voting ===
Name	Pos.	Year	Place
Jim Sears	HB/S	1952	7th
Jon Arnett	HB	1956	10th
O. J. Simpson	TB	1967	2nd
Anthony Davis	TB	1974	2nd
Ricky Bell	TB	1975	3rd
Ricky Bell	TB	1976	2nd
Charles White	TB	1978	4th
Paul McDonald	QB	1979	6th
Rodney Peete	QB	1988	2nd
Keyshawn Johnson	WR	1995	7th
Matt Leinart	QB	2003	6th
Mike Williams	WR	2003	8th
Matt Leinart	QB	2005	3rd
Matt Barkley	QB	2011	6th
Marqise Lee	WR	2012	4th

=== All-time USC football team ===
Chosen by Athlon Sports in 2001

Offense
WR: Lynn Swann 71-73
WR: Keyshawn Johnson 92-95
TE: Hal Bedsole 61-63
OL: Ron Yary 65-67
OL: Tay Brown 30-32
OL: Tony Boselli 91-94
OL: John Baker 29-31
OL: Brad Budde 76-79
OL: Anthony Muñoz 76-79
OL: Bruce Matthews 80-82
QB: Pat Haden 72-74
RB: Mike Garrett 63-65
RB: O. J. Simpson 67-68
RB: Charles White 76-79
RB: Marcus Allen 78-81
PK: Quin Rodriguez 87-90
Mgr: James "Jim" Gerson 79

Defense
DL: Ernie Smith 30-32
DL: Tim Ryan 86-89
DL: Harry Smith 37-39
DL: Aaron Rosenberg 31-33
LB: Chris Claiborne 96-98
LB: Richard Wood 72-74
LB: Jack Del Rio 81-84
LB: Junior Seau 88-89
DB: Ronnie Lott 77-80
DB: Morley Drury 25-27
DB: Mark Carrier 87-89
DB: Tim McDonald 83-86
P: Des Koch 51-53

=== National player awards ===
- Heisman Trophy

Mike Garrett, TB (1965)
O. J. Simpson, TB (1968)
Charles White, TB (1979)
Marcus Allen, TB (1981)
Carson Palmer, QB (2002)
Matt Leinart, QB (2004)
Reggie Bush, RB (2005)
Caleb Williams, QB (2022)

- Maxwell Award

O. J. Simpson, TB (1968)
Charles White, TB (1979)
Marcus Allen, TB (1981)
Caleb Williams, QB (2022)

- Archie Griffin Award

Matt Leinart, QB (2003, 2004)
Sam Darnold, QB (2016)

- Walter Camp Award

O. J. Simpson, TB (1967, 1968)
Charles White, TB (1979)
Marcus Allen, TB (1981)
Matt Leinart, QB (2004)
Reggie Bush, RB (2005)
Caleb Williams, QB (2022)

- Dick Butkus Award

Chris Claiborne, MLB (1998)

- Lombardi Award

Brad Budde, OG (1979)

- Chuck Bednarik Award

Rey Maualuga, LB (2008)

- AP Player of the Year

Matt Leinart, QB (2004)
Reggie Bush, RB (2005)
Caleb Williams, QB (2022)

- Manning Award

Matt Leinart, QB (2004)

- Johnny Unitas Golden Arm Award

Rodney Peete, QB (1988)
Carson Palmer, QB (2002)
Matt Leinart, QB (2005)

- Outland Trophy

Ron Yary, OT (1967)

- Jim Thorpe Award

Mark Carrier, FS (1989)
Adoree' Jackson, CB (2016)

- John Mackey Award

Fred Davis, TE (2007)

- Fred Biletnikoff Award

Marqise Lee, WR (2012)
Makai Lemon, WR (2025)

- Ray Guy Award

Eddie Czaplicki, P (2024)

- Jim Brown Award

Reggie Bush, RB (2005)

- Chic Harley Award

Mike Garrett, RB (1965)
O. J. Simpson, RB (1968)
Charles White, RB (1979)
Marcus Allen, RB (1981)
Reggie Bush, RB (2004, 2005)

- Paul Warfield Trophy

Keyshawn Johnson, WR (1995)
Dwayne Jarrett, WR (2005)
Marqise Lee, WR (2012)

=== National coaching awards ===
- Paul "Bear" Bryant Award

John McKay, Head coach (1962, 1972)

- Home Depot Coach of the Year Award

Pete Carroll, Head coach (2003)

- Broyles Award

Norm Chow, Offensive Coordinator (2002)

- FWAA Co-First Year Coach of the Year

Clay Helton, Head coach (2017)

== Hall of Fame ==
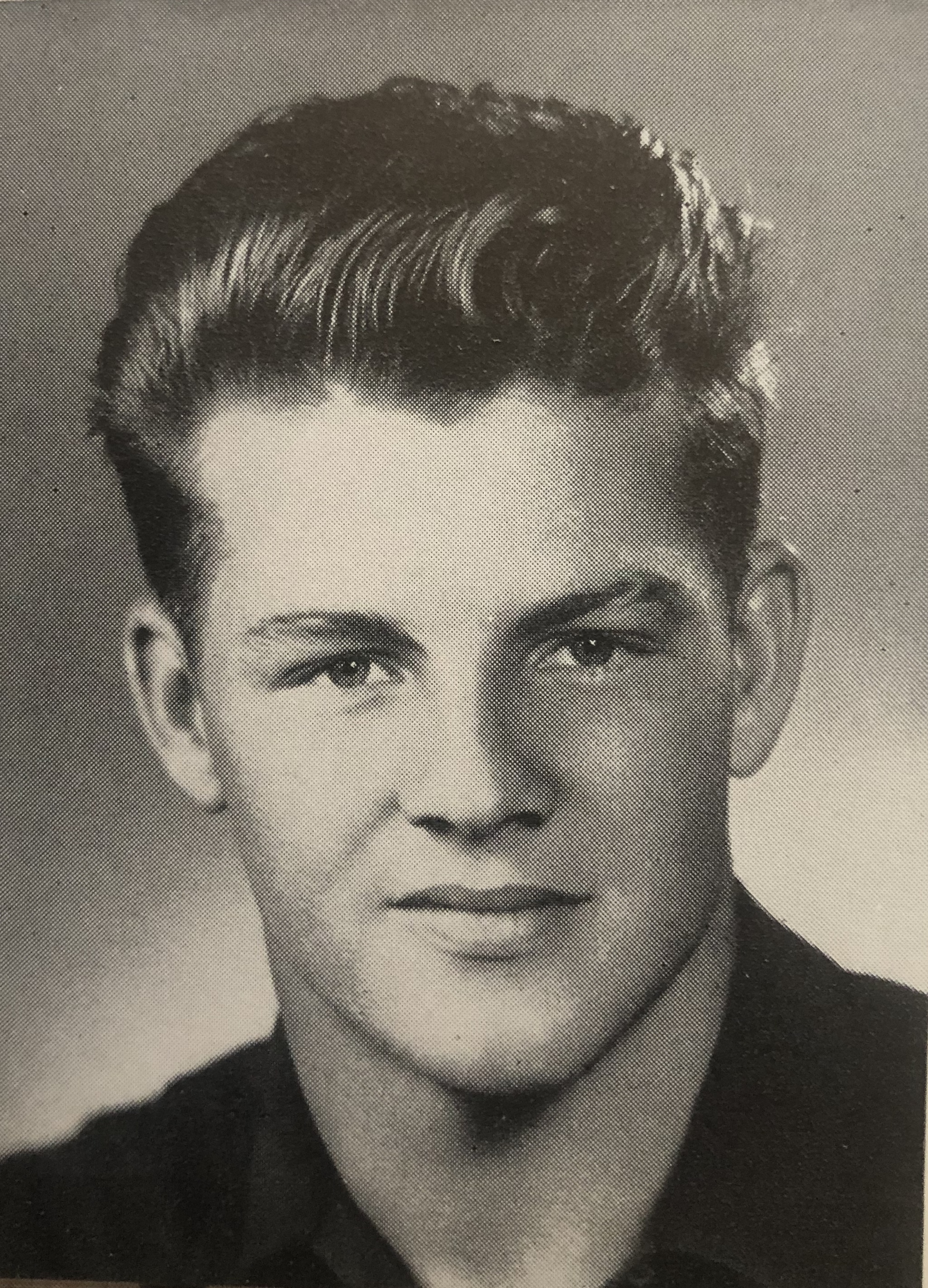
HB / WR Frank Gifford

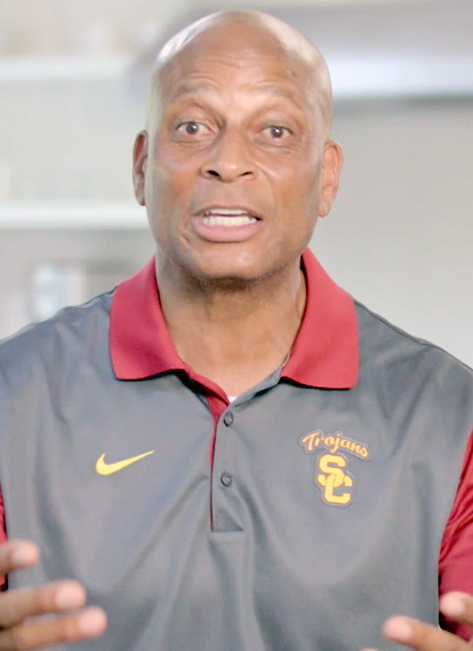
CB Ronnie Lott

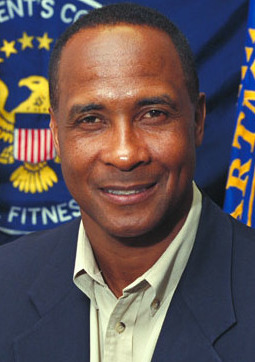
WR Lynn Swann

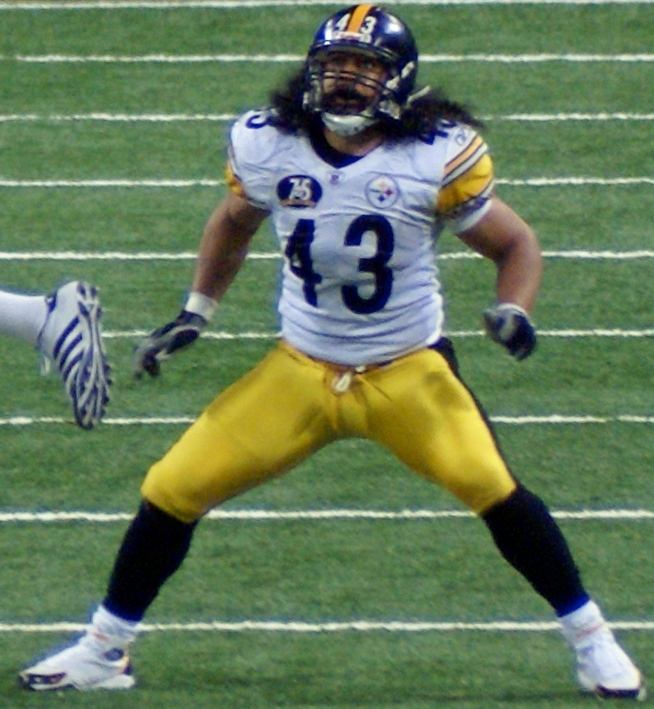
SS Troy Polamalu

=== College Football Hall of Fame inductees ===
Name	Position	Years	Inducted	Ref.
Howard Jones	Coach	1908–1940	1951	
Morley Drury	QB	1925–1927	1954	
Harry Smith	G	1937–1939	1955	
Erny Pinckert	HB	1929–1931	1957	
Aaron Rosenberg	G	1931–1933	1966	
Ernie Smith	T	1930–1932	1970	
Dan McMillan	T	1917, 1919–1921	1971	
Mort Kaer	HB	1924–1926	1972	
John Ferraro	T	1943–1944, 1946–1947	1974	
Frank Gifford	HB	1949–1951	1975	
Cotton Warburton	QB	1932–1934	1975	
Tay Brown	T	1930–1932	1980	
Johnny Baker	G	1929–1931	1983	
O. J. Simpson	HB	1967–1968	1983	
Mike Garrett	HB	1963–1965	1985	
Jeff Bregel	T	1983–1985	1986	
Mike McKeever	G	1958–1960	1987	
Ron Yary	OT	1965–1967	1987	
John McKay	Coach	1960–1975	1988	
Paul Cleary	End	1946–1947	1989	
Lynn Swann	WR	1971–1973	1993	
Marvin Powell	OT	1974–1976	1994	
Charles White	HB	1976–1979	1996	
Brad Budde	G	1976–1979	1998	
Marcus Allen	HB	1978–1981	2000	
Jon Arnett	HB	1954–1956	2001	
Ronnie Lott	S	1977–1980	2002	
Ricky Bell	RB	1973–1976	2003	
Charle Young	TE	1970–1972	2004	
Anthony Davis	RB	1972–1974	2005	
Richard Wood	LB	1972–1974	2007	
John Robinson	Coach	1976–2004	2009	
Sam Cunningham	FB	1970–1972	2010	
Tony Boselli	OT	1991–1994	2014	
Matt Leinart	QB	2003–2005	2017	
Troy Polamalu	S	1999-2002	2019	
Carson Palmer	QB	1998–2002	2021	
Reggie Bush	RB	2003–2005	2023	

=== Pro Football Hall of Fame ===
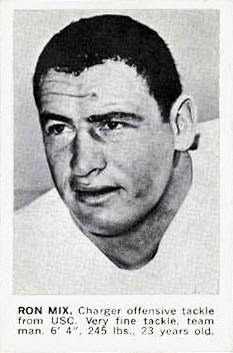
OT Ron Mix

- Frank Gifford, HB (1977)
- Ron Mix, OT (1979)
- Morris "Red" Badgro, E (1981)
- O. J. Simpson, RB (1985)
- Willie Wood, DB (1989)
- Anthony Muñoz, OT (1998)
- Ronnie Lott, DB (2000)
- Lynn Swann, WR (2001)
- Ron Yary, OT (2001)
- Marcus Allen, RB (2003)
- Bruce Matthews, OT, OG, C (2007)
- Junior Seau, LB (2015)
- Troy Polamalu, S (2020)
- Tony Boselli, OT (2022)

=== Canadian Football League ===
- C. J. Gable, RB
- Taylor Mays, S

== NFL ==
Among all colleges and universities, as of 2022, USC holds the all-time record for the most quarterbacks (17) and is tied with the University of Miami for the most wide receivers (40) to go on to play in the NFL.

== Trojans in the entertainment industry ==
Beginning in the silent movie era, wrote Garry Wills, "USC football players mingled with the movie stars who came to their games and offered them bit parts in their movies." One such player was John Wayne, who played tackle on the 1925 and 1926 team; another was Ward Bond, who played on the 1926–1928 teams. (As a publicity stunt, the Atlanta Falcons drafted the 64-year-old John Wayne the 1971 NFL draft.)

Other Trojan football players who went on to have movie careers include O. J. Simpson (actor), Allan Graf (director and stunt coordinator), Aaron Rosenberg (producer), Mazio Royster (actor), Patrick O'Hara (actor), Russell Saunders (director), Nate Barragar (director), Jesse Hibbs (actor), Tim Rossovich (actor), Phil Hoover, Cotton Warburton (film editor), and Mike Henry (actor),

== Media ==
- Radio flagship: KSPN 710 AM
- Spanish-language radio flagship: KTNQ 1020-AM in Glendale, California
- Broadcasters: Pete Arbogast (play-by-play), Shaun Cody and John Jackson share duties as color analyst with Jordan Moore acting as the sideline announcer.
- Spanish-language broadcasters: Pepe Mantilla (play-by-play), Daniel Arreola (analyst/play-by-play) and Erika Garza (analyst)
- Past broadcasters: Tom Kelly, Lee Hacksaw Hamilton, Larry Kahn, Mike Walden, Chick Hearn, have also been full time play-by-play announcers for the team since 1956.

Past color analysts include Paul McDonald, Tom Harmon, Braven Dyer, Bill Symes, Jim Wilkerson, Dick Danahe, Don Anderson, Bud Tucker, Jim Perry, Fred Gallagher, Mike Lamb and Jeremy Hogue.

Sideline announcers have been Arbogast, Jackson, Tony Femino, Tim Ryan, Petros Papadakis, Lindsay Soto-Rhodes, Mark Willard and Brandon Hancock.

Radio station KNX AM-1070 in Los Angeles has had the most years as the team's flagship station, holding that honor from 1956 to 1968 and again from 1977 to 1994. KFI AM-640 was the flagship from 1969 to 1972, KLSX FM-97.1 held the flag in 1998, followed by XTRA AM-690 in 1999 and 2000. From 2001 to 2005, KMPC AM-1540 was the Trojans' flagship station. KSPN AM-710 was the flagship from 2006 to 2018. Pete Arbogast, who has called Trojans football since 1989, announced his seventh Rose Bowl game on January 1, 2017. Arbogast also called the Rose Bowl game for USC for the university's campus radio station, KSCR, in 1978 and 1979. Arbogast, Kelly and Walden are all members of the Southern California Sportscasters Hall of Fame.

- Public address announcer: Eric Smith

Previously: John Ramsey (member of the Southern California Sportscasters Hall of Fame), and Dennis Packer.

== Future Big Ten Conference opponents ==
Announced schedules as of October 5, 2023.

2026	2027	2028
Maryland	Illinois	Iowa
Ohio State	Indiana	Nebraska
Oregon	Minnesota	Penn State
Washington	Wisconsin	Purdue
at Indiana	UCLA	at Michigan
at Penn State	at Iowa	at Michigan State
at Rutgers	at Maryland	at Northwestern
at Wisconsin	at Ohio State	at Oregon
at UCLA	at Washington	at UCLA

== Future non-conference opponents ==
Announced schedules as of February 25, 2026.

2026	2027	2028
San Jose State	UNLV	Fresno State
Fresno State	Nevada	
Louisiana		

== See also ==
- Giles Pellerin, who attended 797 consecutive USC football games from 1925 until his death during the USC–UCLA game in 1998
- American football in the United States
- College football
