= Lewis R. Freeman =

American explorer, journalist and war correspondent

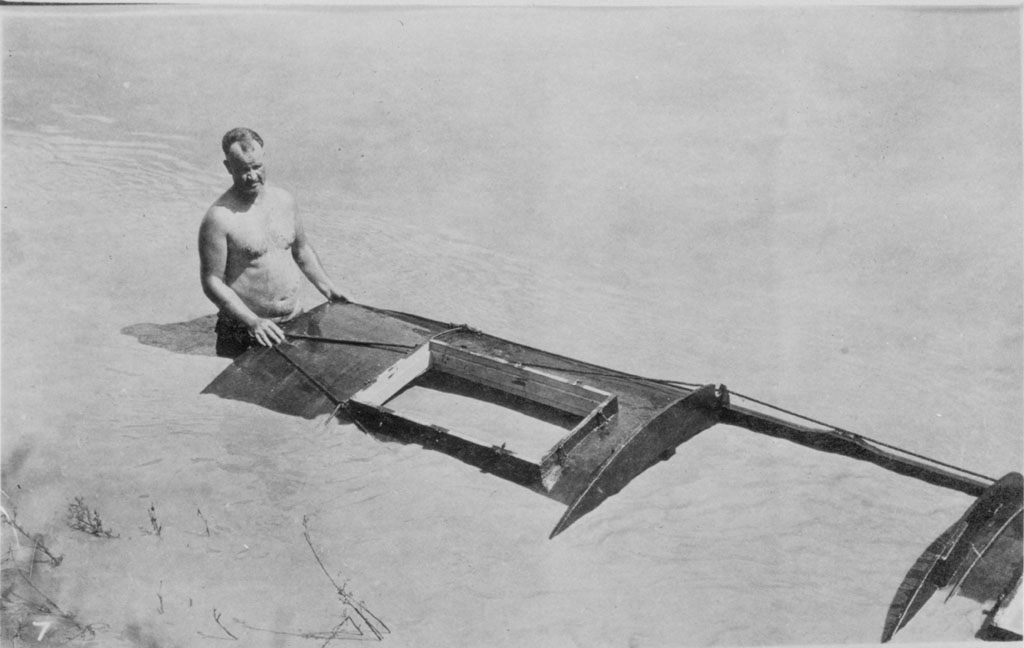
Lewis Freeman at Lees Ferry, Arizona, 1923

Lewis Ransome Freeman (4 October 1878, Genoa Junction, Wisconsin – 6 November 1960 Pasadena, California) was an American explorer, journalist and war correspondent who wrote over twenty books chronicling his many travels, as well as numerous articles.

== Biography ==
Freeman was born in Genoa Junction, Wisconsin, the son of Otto Freeman and Maria (Clary) Freeman, and moved with his family to Pasadena, California as a boy. He attended Stanford University, where he earned letters in football, baseball, tennis and track, and graduated in 1898. While a student at Stanford, he also served as coach of the University of Southern California's football team in 1897. The team's schedule included games on Thanksgiving, Christmas and New Year's Day, compiling a record of 5–1 and outscoring opponents 100–18; the only blemish was an 18–0 road loss on Christmas to a San Diego YMCA team, USC's second game ever outside of Los Angeles County. (USC teams were called the Methodists before becoming the Trojans in 1912.) Freeman was the team's first coach since its initial season in 1888, and brought the players new, standard uniforms with "USC" on the front and all the other elements common for the period. Afterward, USC football teams again played without a coach until 1901.

After graduating from Stanford, Freeman spent the years 1899 to 1912 traveling throughout the Americas, Asia, Africa and the Pacific Islands, although in his various returns to Pasadena he continued his athletic endeavours, winning the 1903 Ojai Tennis Tournament in both men's singles and doubles, also finishing as doubles runner-up in 1908. In 1905 he served as a war correspondent in the Russo-Japanese War, and in 1910 he was a member of a commission of Pacific Coast chambers of commerce which traveled to China. During World War I he was a correspondent with the British, French, and Italian armies from 1915 to 1917, and he became a lieutenant in the Royal Naval Volunteer Reserve in 1917–18. He was a correspondent attached to the Grand Fleet late in the war, and was a staff member for the Inter-Allied Naval Armistice Commission which traveled to Germany in 1918.

After World War I, Freeman focused on writing, turning out nine books between 1918 and 1922, and another each year through 1928. In 1925 he was a special correspondent with the U.S. Navy Pacific Fleet on its cruise to Australasia; he again served as a special naval correspondent covering Fleet maneuvers in 1929, 1932 and 1935. In 1923 he was boatman and photographer for a U.S. Geological Survey expedition through the Grand Canyon, and the same year he illustrated with photographs a special edition of Rudyard Kipling's poem "The Feet of the Young Men".

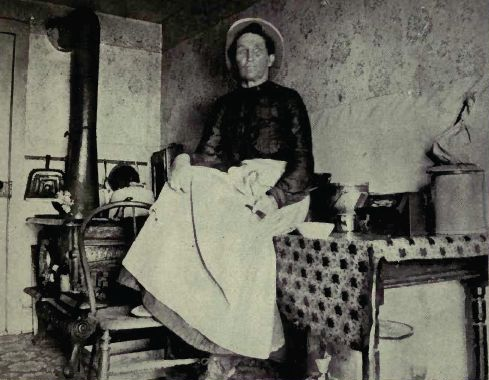
Calamity Jane in her kitchen in Livingston, Montana, when she met Louis R. Freeman in 1901, the meeting described in "Down the Yellowstone"

Freeman was invited to participate in the 1923 United States Geological Survey (USGS) of the Colorado River in Grand Canyon by E. C. LaRue. He had piloted a boat for the 1922 USGS survey of Glen Canyon. Freeman's flamboyant articles about the 1922 trip were a contributing factor to his being invited to participate in the 1923 trip. On the Grand Canyon cruise, Freeman's nickname was "The Gorilla." While portaging their boats at Lava Falls, the trip experienced a stunning up and down rise in river flow. The Colorado river was a mild 9,380 cubic feet per second by 17 September 1923. On 19 September, the river had risen to 98,500 cfs, and by 24 September, the river was back down to 14,200 cfs. The water began rising after the men had all just turned in for the night. The group, including Freeman, spent a sleepless night and all the next day moving their boats ever farther up the bank at the foot of the rapid. They were ten days late into Diamond Creek, but were otherwise fine. On 13 October 1923, the surveyors connected their level line. In recounting the event, Colorado River historian Otis R. Marston noted the boats were beached and the recorder worked on Burchard's readings, as all hands gathered around. The compilation showed the elevations checked within four feet at the end of their 251-mile survey, and there was general relief and rejoicing. Freeman made much of the ceremony of the event and shook Burchard's hand commenting, "this is a real triumph." An arch in the wall of the canyon was given the name Triumphal Arch and the rapid named Triumphal Arch Rapid.

In 1930–31, Freeman was part of an airplane and motorboat expedition to Central and South America, and in 1933 he embarked on a series of airplane flights exploring the coasts and interior of South America. In 1935 Freeman rode coast to coast on a bicycle, starting from Los Angeles to Vancouver, then from Vancouver to Montreal, and ending riding from Montreal to New York city. A total of more than 3500 miles. In 1936 he took part in cruises to the Juan Fernández Islands and Tierra del Fuego, as well as an expedition to the headwaters of the Amazon and Ecuador. In 1938 he undertook an expedition to the highlands of southern Mexico and Guatemala. In 1939 he took part in a cruise to the Galápagos Islands and the west coast of Colombia, and in 1941 he explored Bolivia, Peru and Brazil.

Freeman was a member of the Explorers Club in New York City, but also regularly traveled to his family home in Pasadena. He retired to Pasadena in 1955, and died there at age 82.

== Books ==
- Many Fronts (1918)
- Stories of the Ships (1919)
- Sea Hounds (1919)
- To Kiel in the Hercules (1919)
- In the Tracks of the Trades: The Account of a Fourteen Thousand Mile Yachting Cruise to the Hawaiis, Marquesas, Societies, Samoas and Fijis (1920)
- Hell's Hatches (1921)
- Down the Columbia (1921)
- Down the Yellowstone (1922)
- When Cassi Blooms (1922)
- The Colorado River – Yesterday, Today, and Tomorrow (1923)
- Down the Grand Canyon (1924)
- On the Roof of the Rockies (1925)
- By Water Ways to Gotham (1926)
- Waterways of Westward Wandering (1927)
- The Nearing North (1928)
- Afloat and Aflight in the Caribbean (1932)
- South America – Airwise and Otherwise (1933)
- Marquesan Nocturne (1936)
- Discovering South America (1937)
- Many Rivers (1937)
- Brazil, Land of Tomorrow (1942)
