= Harvey Holmes =

American football player and sports coach

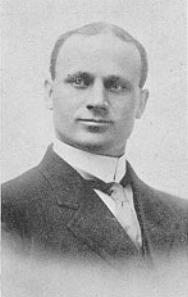
- Holmes pictured in Wickup 1913, Idaho State yearbook

Biographical details
- Born: January 16, 1873; Geneva, Minnesota, U.S.
- Died: May 10, 1948 (aged 75); Salt Lake City, Utah, U.S.

Playing career

Football
- 1897–1898: Wisconsin
- Position: Tackle

Coaching career (HC unless noted)

Football
- 1900–1903: Utah
- 1904–1907: USC
- 1909–1914: Academy of Idaho

Baseball
- 1901–1904: Utah
- 1908: USC

Track
- 1905–1908: USC

Head coaching record
- Overall: 60–24–4 (football); 21–11 (baseball)

Harvey Robson Holmes (January 16, 1873 – May 10, 1948) was an American football player and coach of football, baseball, and track. He served as the head football coach the University of Utah, (1900–1903), the University of Southern California (1904–1907), and the Academy of Idaho—now known as Idaho State University—(1909–1914), compiling a career college football record of 60–24–4. Holmes was the head baseball coach at Utah from 1901 to 1904 and at USC in 1908, tallying a career college baseball mark of 21–11. In addition, he served as the head track coach at USC from 1905 to 1908.

== Early life and playing career ==
Holmes was born in Geneva, Minnesota. He attended the University of Wisconsin–Madison, where he lettered in football in 1897 and 1898.

== Coaching career ==
Holmes became head football coach at the University of Utah in 1900, and led the team to a record of 16–9–1; he was the first Utah coach to coach for multiple seasons. But his most enduring contribution at Utah may have been his composition of the lyrics to the school song "Utah Man."

In 1904 Holmes became the first salaried head coach of the USC football team, and he compiled a 19–5–3 (.759) record over four seasons. USC's teams were called the Methodists before becoming the Trojans in 1912. In 1905, Holmes was the coach of the first USC team to play outside of Southern California. On November 4, playing a game at Stanford, the Methodists were trampled 16–0 by the traditional West Coast powerhouse; it was also USC's first game ever against major college competition, an experiment which the team would not repeat until 1914. While USC and Stanford would not meet again until 1918 (Stanford dropped football for rugby during those years), this was the beginning of USC's oldest rivalry. But college football was going through a crisis period in which numerous players were dying in games every year, and many schools dropped the sport in favor of rugby for several seasons; the University of California switched from football to rugby from 1906 through 1914, and Stanford dropped football from 1906 through the end of World War I in 1918. Given its schedule featuring small colleges, high schools, and military and club teams, USC in that period had little need for a football coach with Holmes' credentials, and he departed in 1908; the university eventually switched to rugby from 1911 to 1913. Holmes' 1906 and 1907 teams had a combined record of 7–1–2, and outscored their opponents 218–20.

Holmes also coached the USC track team from 1905 to 1908, and was the first formal coach of the baseball team in 1908, posting a record of 17–2. He was succeeded as football coach by USC Law School graduate Bill Traeger.

In 1909 Holmes became football coach at the Academy of Idaho, where his teams had a record of 28–8 over six seasons, including perfect records of 4–0 and 6–0 in his first two years.

== Death ==
Holmes died at the age of 75 on May 10, 1948, in Salt Lake City, Utah.

== Head coaching record ==
=== Football ===
Year	Team	Overall	Conference	Standing	Bowl/playoffs
Utah Utes (Independent) (1900–1913)
1900	Utah	2–1			
1901	Utah	3–1			
1902	Utah	5–2–1			
1903	Utah	3–5			
Utah:		13–9–1			
USC Methodists (Independent) (1904–1907)
1904	USC	6–1			
1905	USC	6–3–1			
1906	USC	2–0–2			
1907	USC	5–1			
USC:		19–5–3			
Academy of Idaho Bantams (Independent) (1909–1914)
1909	Academy of Idaho	5–0			
1909	Academy of Idaho	5–0			
1910	Academy of Idaho	6–1			
1911	Academy of Idaho	5–4			
1912	Academy of Idaho	1–2			
1913	Academy of Idaho	5–2			
1914	Academy of Idaho	6–1			
Academy of Idaho:		28–10			
Total:		60–24–4			
