= Frank H. Suffel =

Canadian-American lawyer, teacher, football coach

Biographical details
- Born: July 5, 1866; Vienna, Canada West
- Died: March 15, 1937 (aged 70); Pasadena, California, U.S.
- Education: University of Toronto (1888)

Coaching career (HC unless noted)
- 1888: USC

Head coaching record
- Overall: 2–0

Frank Hammond Suffel (July 5, 1866 – March 15, 1937) was a Canadian-born lawyer, college Latin instructor, and college football coach. Born in Vienna, Ontario, he worked as a Latin instructor at the University of Southern California (USC) during the 1888–89 academic year. Suffel served as the co-head football coach with Henry H. Goddard at USC in 1888, compiling a record of 2–0.

Suffel was the food administrator for Southern California during World War I. He died on March 15, 1937, after suffering a heart attack at his home in Pasadena, California.

== Head coaching record ==
Year	Team	Overall	Conference	Standing	Bowl/playoffs
USC Methodists (Independent) (1888)
1888	USC	2–0			
USC:		2–0			
Total:		2–0			
