= Don Clark (American football) =

American football player and coach (1923–1989)

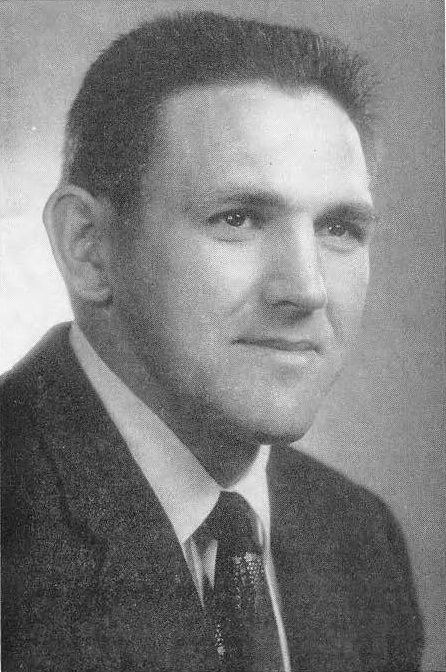
- Clark, c. 1958

Profile
- Positions: Guard, linebacker

Personal information
- Born: December 22, 1923; Churdan, Iowa, U.S.
- Died: August 6, 1989 (aged 65); Huntington Beach, California, U.S.
- Listed height: 5 ft 11 in (1.80 m)
- Listed weight: 197 lb (89 kg)

Career information
- College: USC

Career history
- 1948–1949: San Francisco 49ers

Awards and highlights
- Second-team All-PCC (1947)
- Stats at Pro Football Reference

Donald Rex Clark (December 22, 1923 – August 6, 1989) was an American football player and coach who was perhaps best known as the head coach of the USC Trojans football team from 1957 to 1959. He compiled a 13–16–1 record while coaching at USC, going 0–5–1 against rivals UCLA and Notre Dame. The highlight of his career was in 1959, when USC shared the inaugural AAWU title in a three-way tie. However, he remains the only coach to post a losing record at USC over more than one season.

== Early career ==
Clark was born in Churdan, Iowa, and his family moved to Los Angeles when he was 15. He attended USC, where he played as a guard on the football team under coach Jeff Cravath in 1942 before entering the military during World War II.

Playing alongside teammates including John Ferraro and Paul Salata, he returned to USC for the 1946 and 1947 seasons, and was captain of the latter team which lost the 1948 Rose Bowl to Michigan.

He served in a rifle platoon during the Battle of the Bulge, and lost fillings in six teeth when an 88 shell went off nearby. Following the war he competed in military track meets in the shot put, and received an athletic award from General George S. Patton.

He played for the San Francisco 49ers in the All-America Football Conference (AAFC) in 1948 and 1949 as a linebacker and guard.

== Coaching ==
In 1950, he became an assistant coach at Navy under head coach Eddie Erdelatz. He then returned to USC for five years as an assistant under Jess Hill, including the teams which won the 1953 Rose Bowl 7–0 over Wisconsin and played in the 1955 Rose Bowl against Ohio State. When Hill became USC's athletic director in 1957, Clark succeeded him as head coach on the recommendation of players including Jon Arnett. But USC, along with UCLA, Washington and California, was subjected at that time to Pacific Coast Conference sanctions; widespread displeasure over the issue among the various schools would lead to the reorganization of the conference in 1959. When Clark took over, the university had not recruited players for two years and had no scholarship quarterbacks or receivers.

USC posted a 1–9 record in his first season, their worst mark since 1901, but improved to 4–5–1 in 1958; Clark recruited talented players such as Marlin and Mike McKeever, and also brought in a number of excellent assistant coaches, including highly popular Marv Goux. The Trojans won their first eight games in 1959 with a team that featured Ron Mix and Willie Wood, sharing the conference title with UCLA and Washington, but were barred from a bowl game due to NCAA sanctions. The 1959 team also had an impressive coaching staff which included John McKay and Al Davis, but after season-ending losses to UCLA and Notre Dame, Clark resigned and was replaced by McKay.

== Business ==
Clark later became vice president of his family's business, the Prudential Overall Supply of Costa Mesa, California, and eventually became the company's president until his death. A resident of Fountain Valley, Clark died in Huntington Beach, California at age 65 after suffering a heart attack while jogging. He was survived by his wife Dorothy and their eight children, as well as 24 grandchildren.

== Head coaching record ==
Year	Team	Overall	Conference	Standing	Bowl/playoffs	Coaches^{#}	AP^{°}
USC Trojans (Pacific Coast Conference) (1957–1958)
1957	USC	1–9	1–6	T–7th			
1958	USC	4–5–1	4–2–1	3rd			
USC Trojans (Athletic Association of Western Universities) (1959)
1959	USC	8–2	3–1	T–1st		13	14
USC:		13–16–1	8–9–1				
Total:		13–16–1					
National championship Conference title Conference division title or championship game berth
^{#}Rankings from final Coaches Poll.; ^{°}Rankings from final AP Poll.
