= Donte Williams =

American football player and coach (born 1982)

Current position
- Title: Defensive backs coach
- Team: Georgia
- Conference: SEC

Biographical details
- Born: September 1, 1982 (age 43); Los Angeles, California, U.S.

Playing career
- 2002: Pasadena City
- 2003: Syracuse
- 2004–2005: Idaho State
- 2007: Rio Grande Valley Dorados
- 2008: Arkansas Twisters
- Position: Defensive back

Coaching career (HC unless noted)
- 2007: Los Angeles Harbor (CB)
- 2008: El Camino (CB)
- 2009: Mt. San Antonio (CB)
- 2010: Nevada (DQC)
- 2011–2012: Washington (GA)
- 2013: San Jose State (CB)
- 2014–2015: San Jose State (DB/RC)
- 2016: Arizona (CB)
- 2017: Nebraska (CB)
- 2018–2019: Oregon (CB)
- 2020: USC (PGC/CB)
- 2021: USC (AHC/PGC/CB)
- 2021: USC (interim HC)
- 2022–2023: USC (DB/PGC)
- 2024–present: Georgia (DB)

Head coaching record
- Overall: 3–7

Donte Antonio Williams (born September 1, 1982) is an American football coach who is the defensive backs coach at the University of Georgia. He previously served as USC's associate head coach under Clay Helton, and he became USC's interim head coach on September 13, 2021, after Helton was fired. After leading the Trojans for the final 10 games of the 2021 season, Williams remained at the school on the staff of new head coach Lincoln Riley. A coach with stints at Oregon, Nebraska, Arizona, and San Jose State, Williams has established himself as one of the nation's top college football recruiters.

Williams played college football at Pasadena City College, Syracuse, and Idaho State before playing professionally in the AF2.

== Coaching career ==
=== Early career ===
Williams began his coaching career in 2007 at Los Angeles Harbor College as their cornerbacks coach. He then went to serve in the same position at El Camino College in 2008. In 2009, Williams joined Mt. San Antonio College as their cornerbacks coach.

=== Nevada ===
In 2010, Williams was hired as a defensive quality control coach at the University of Nevada, Reno.

=== Washington ===
In 2011, Williams joined as a graduate assistant at the University of Washington.

=== San Jose State ===
In 2013, Williams was hired to be the cornerbacks coach at San Jose State University. In 2014, he was promoted to defensive backs coach and recruiting coordinator.

=== Arizona ===
In 2016, Williams joined the University of Arizona as their cornerbacks coach.

=== Nebraska ===
In 2017, Williams was hired to be the cornerbacks coach at the University of Nebraska–Lincoln.

=== Oregon ===
In 2018, Williams joined the University of Oregon as their cornerbacks coach under head coach Mario Cristobal.

=== USC ===
In 2020, Williams was hired as the defensive passing game coordinator and cornerbacks coach at the University of Southern California (USC) under head coach Clay Helton. In 2021, he was promoted to assistant head coach.

On September 13, 2021, Williams was named USC's interim head coach following Helton's dismissal. Williams became the first Black head coach in USC's football history. On September 18, 2021, Williams made his head coaching debut and led the Trojans to a 45–14 victory over Washington State. The Trojans went 3-7 under Williams during the program's worst season in 30 years.

Williams was retained on USC's staff by Riley in January 2022 as the Trojans' defensive backs coach and defensive passing game coordinator.

=== Georgia ===
In December 2023, Williams left USC to become the defensive backs coach at the University of Georgia.

== Head coaching record ==
Year	Team	Overall	Conference	Standing	Bowl/playoffs
USC Trojans (Pac-12 Conference) (2021)
2021	USC	3–7 (Note: Williams was named interim head coach on September 13 after Clay Helton was fired.)	3–5	T–4th (South)	
USC:		3–7	3–5		
Total:		3–7			
