= 2004 USC Trojans football team =

American college football season

2004 USC Trojans football

AP Poll national champion BCS national champion (vacated) Pac-10 champion (vacated) Orange Bowl champion (vacated)

Orange Bowl (BCS NCG), W 55–19 (vacated) vs. Oklahoma
- Conference: Pacific-10 Conference

Ranking
- Coaches: No. 1
- AP: No. 1
- Record: 11–0, 2 wins vacated (7–0 Pac-10, 1 win vacated)
- Head coach: Pete Carroll (4th season)
- Offensive coordinator: Norm Chow (4th season)
- Offensive scheme: Pro-style
- Base defense: 4–3
- Captains: Shaun Cody; Matt Grootegoed; Matt Leinart
- Home stadium: Los Angeles Memorial Coliseum (c. 92,000, grass)

2004 Pacific-10 Conference football standings
	Conf.			Overall
Team	W		L	W		L
No. 1 USC † $	8	–	0	13	–	0
No. 9 California	7	–	1	10	–	2
No. 19 Arizona State	5	–	3	9	–	3
Oregon State	5	–	3	7	–	5
UCLA	4	–	4	6	–	6
Oregon	4	–	4	5	–	6
Washington State	3	–	5	5	–	6
Stanford	2	–	6	4	–	7
Arizona	2	–	6	3	–	8
Washington	0	–	8	1	–	10
$ – Conference champion; † – USC later vacated 2 wins (1 in conference), as well as the BCS and Pac-10 championships, due to NCAA sanctions.; Rankings from AP Poll

The 2004 USC Trojans football team represented the University of Southern California in the 2004 NCAA Division I-A football season. The 2004 Trojans football team won the 2004 BCS National Championship by winning the 2005 Orange Bowl, that year's BCS National Championship Game. The team also won the AP title for the second year in a row. It was the Trojans' first unanimous national championship since 1972, and the second time a team had gone wire-to-wire, with the Trojans holding the number 1 spot in the polls all season. The team was coached by Pete Carroll in his fourth year with the Trojans, and played its home games in the Los Angeles Memorial Coliseum.

Quarterback Matt Leinart won the Heisman Trophy as the most outstanding collegiate football player in the U.S. His teammate, running back Reggie Bush, finished fifth in Heisman voting, winning the following year. Both were named co-winners of the Pac-10 Offensive Player of the Year. The team captains were Shaun Cody, Matt Grootegoed and Matt Leinart.

Because of the controversy that ended the 2003 NCAA Division I-A football season with a split national title between LSU and USC, the motto for the Trojans' 2004 season became "Leave No Doubt." Ironically, the changes made to the BCS due to the 2003 season did not resolve issues with multiple undefeated teams, as Auburn and Utah finished undefeated, yet they did not get to play USC or any other team for the title.

On June 10, 2010, USC was forced to vacate its two final wins from the 2004 season (December 2004 against UCLA and the BCS championship game), as well as all wins from the 2005 season, following an NCAA investigation into violations by the Trojans' football and men's basketball programs, mainly revolving around the eligibility of Reggie Bush. Since the vacated games included the Trojans' Orange Bowl win, the Trojans were later stripped of the 2004 BCS title in June 2011. However, the Associated Press (AP) still recognizes USC as winners of the 2004 national championship.

== Schedule ==
Date	Time	Opponent	Rank	Site	TV	Result	Attendance
August 28	4:45 p.m.	vs. Virginia Tech*	No. 1	FedExField; Landover, MD (BCA Classic)	ESPN	W 24–13	91,665
September 11	5:00 p.m.	Colorado State*	No. 1	Los Angeles Memorial Coliseum; Los Angeles, CA	ABC	W 49–0	85,521
September 18	7:00 p.m.	at BYU*	No. 1	LaVell Edwards Stadium; Provo, UT	ESPN	W 42–10	63,467
September 25	4:00 p.m.	at Stanford	No. 1	Stanford Stadium; Stanford, CA (rivalry)	TBS	W 31–28	55,750
October 9	12:30 p.m.	No. 7 California	No. 1	Los Angeles Memorial Coliseum; Los Angeles, CA (College GameDay)	ABC	W 23–17	90,008
October 16	12:30 p.m.	No. 15 Arizona State	No. 1	Los Angeles Memorial Coliseum; Los Angeles, CA	ABC	W 45–7	90,211
October 23	3:30 p.m.	Washington	No. 1	Los Angeles Memorial Coliseum; Los Angeles, CA	FSN	W 38–0	72,855
October 30	4:00 p.m.	at Washington State	No. 1	Martin Stadium; Pullman, WA	ABC	W 42–12	35,117
November 6	7:15 p.m.	at Oregon State	No. 1	Reser Stadium; Corvallis, OR	FSN	W 28–20	36,412
November 13	7:15 p.m.	Arizona^{†}	No. 1	Los Angeles Memorial Coliseum; Los Angeles, CA	FSN	W 49–9	80,167
November 27	5:00 p.m.	Notre Dame*	No. 1	Los Angeles Memorial Coliseum; Los Angeles, CA (rivalry, College GameDay)	ABC	W 41–10	92,611
December 4	12:30 p.m.	at UCLA	No. 1	Rose Bowl; Pasadena, CA (Victory Bell)	ABC	W 29–24 (vacated)	88,442
January 4, 2005	5:15 p.m.	vs. No. 2 Oklahoma*	No. 1	Pro Player Stadium; Miami Gardens, FL (Orange Bowl—BCS National Championship Game, College GameDay)	ABC	W 55–19 (vacated)	77,912
*Non-conference game; ^{†}Homecoming; Rankings from AP Poll released prior to the game; All times are in Pacific time

== Game summaries ==
=== Virginia Tech ===
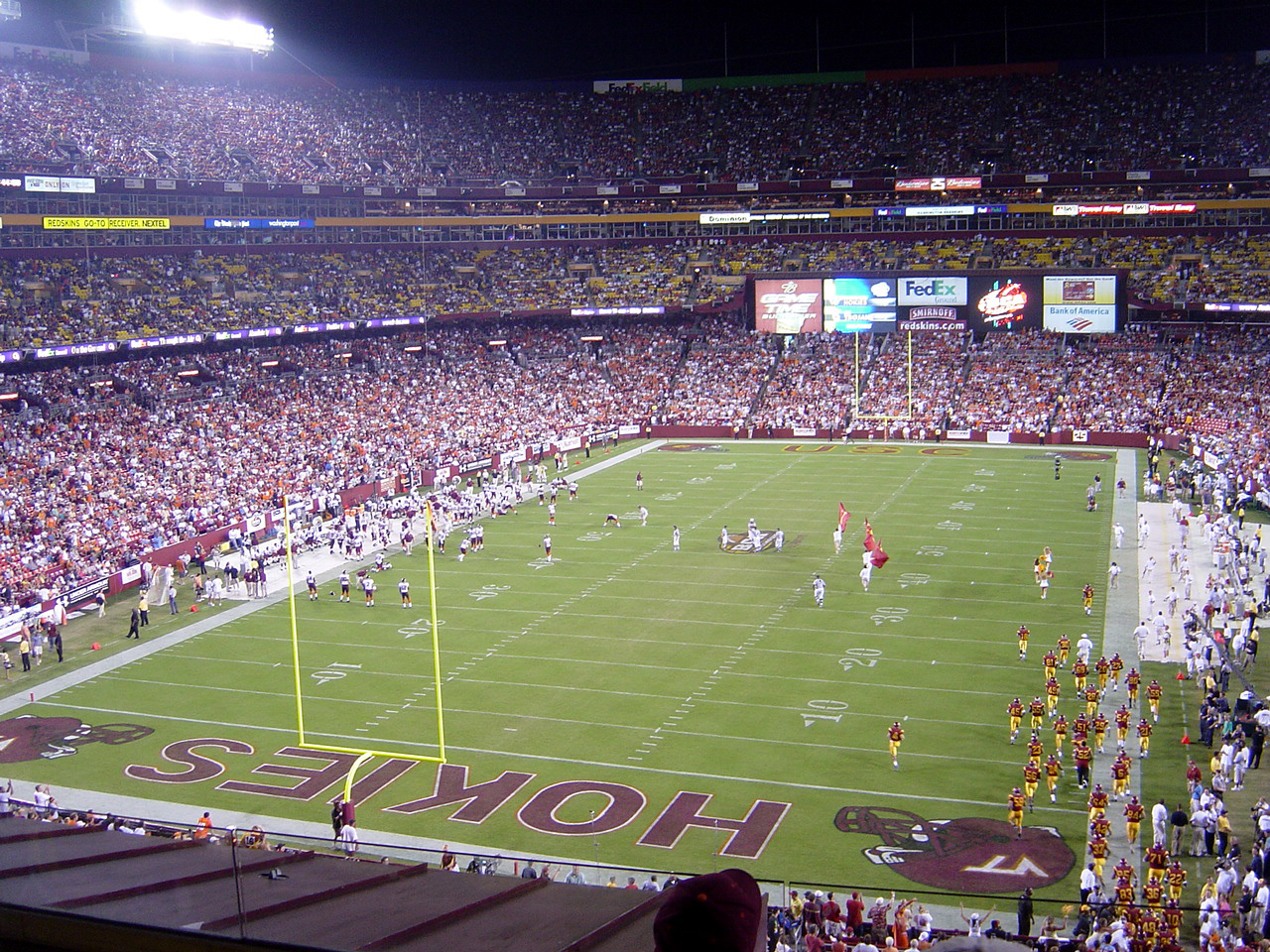
Trojans take the field at the 2004 BCA Classic.

	1	2	3	4	Total
Hokies	3	7	0	3	13
#1 Trojans	7	0	7	10	24

USC and Virginia Tech opened the 2004 college football season with the Black Coaches Association Football Classic at a sold out FedExField in Landover, Maryland. Days before the game, the NCAA declared star Trojans wide receiver Mike Williams ineligible to play after a failed attempt to join the NFL early, creating concern over whether the defending 2003 National Champions were prepared to try for another title. This was the first time the two teams had competed in football; and with the game held only three hours away from Virginia Tech, the crowd was dominated by Hokies fans. The game marked the emergence of running back Reggie Bush, who often lined up at wide receiver, catching five passes for 127 yards and scored three touchdowns in a tight game. Although Virginia Tech was not ranked going into the game, they ended the season ranked 9th, going 10–3 (7–1 in the ACC), becoming ACC Champions in their first year in the conference and were invited to the 2005 Nokia Sugar Bowl.

=== Colorado State ===
	1	2	3	4	Total
Rams	0	0	0	0	0
#1 Trojans	7	21	14	7	49

Colorado State visited USC in the first meeting between the two programs. The Trojans dominated the Rams en route to a 49–0 shut out, led by running back LenDale White who ran for 123 yards on 14 carries, scoring three touchdowns. Matt Leinart went 20-of-31 for 231 yards in three quarters before being retired from the game, Dwayne Jarrett caught a touchdown on what was his 18th birthday, and the Trojans handed the Rams their worse loss in eight years and first shut out in 85 games.

=== BYU ===
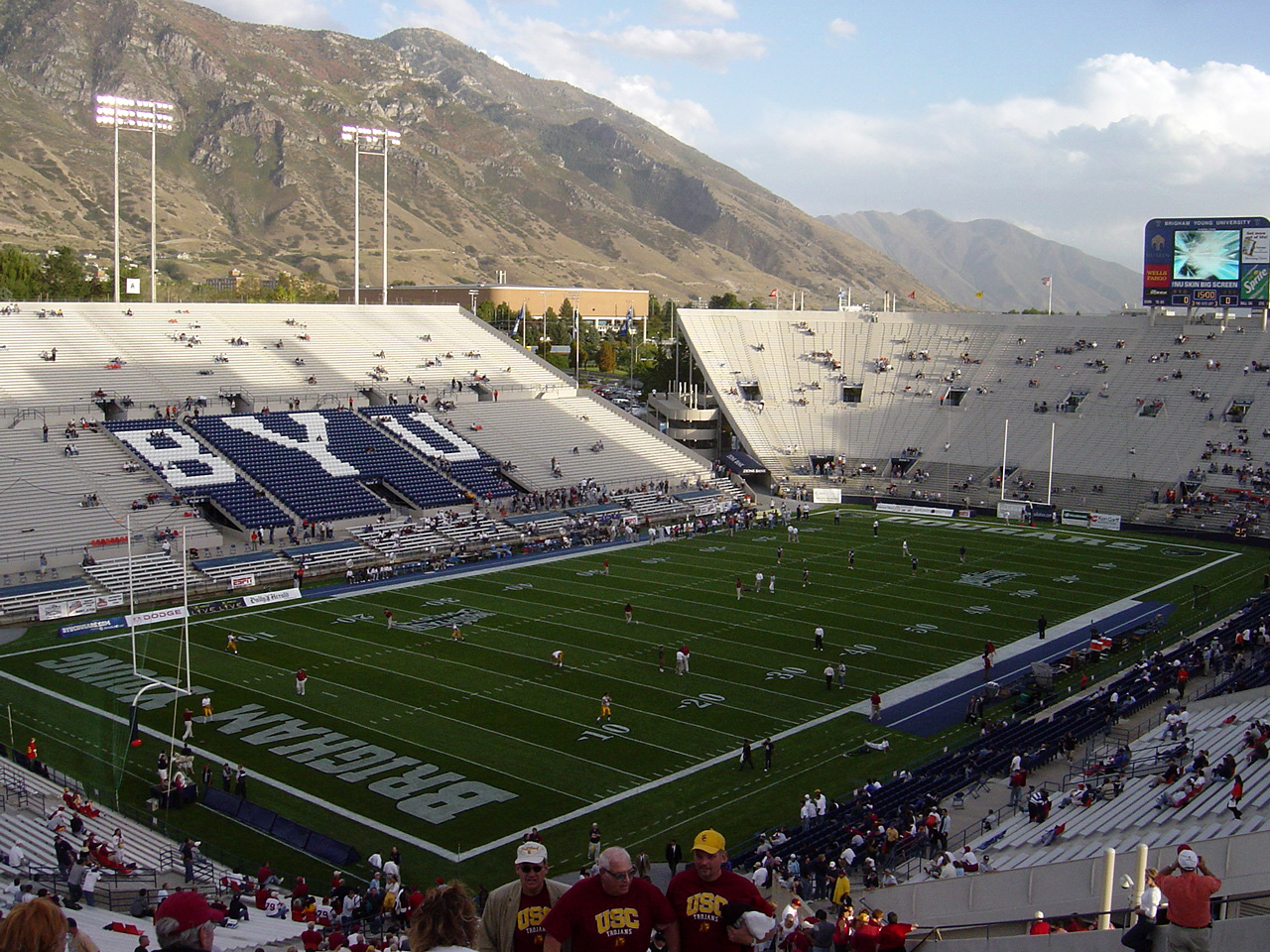
Fans enter the stadium before USC at BYU.

	1	2	3	4	Total
#1 Trojans	0	21	0	21	42
Cougars	0	3	7	0	10

The Trojans made their first visit to LaVell Edwards Stadium, on the campus of Brigham Young University in Provo, Utah. The game marked the return of USC Offensive Coordinator Norm Chow to the program where he spent 27 years as an assistant under former Coach LaVell Edwards. Running backs Reggie Bush and LenDale White both broke 100 yards each en route to victory.

=== Stanford ===
	1	2	3	4	Total
#1 Trojans	10	7	7	7	31
Cardinal	7	21	0	0	28

USC had what would be its closest game of the season against the unheralded Stanford Cardinal at Stanford Stadium in their Pacific-10 Conference opener. Both USC and Stanford had just previously beat BYU in convincing fashion; however, Stanford had the added benefit of a bye week to rest and reorganize between games. By halftime, USC found itself down 11 points after the Cardinal caught them by surprise with an 82-yard run final play while trying to run out the clock to end the half. After an energetic and emotional halftime in the locker room, the Trojan defense shut down the Cardinal while the offense put together the drives that gave the Trojans the lead and the victory.

=== California ===
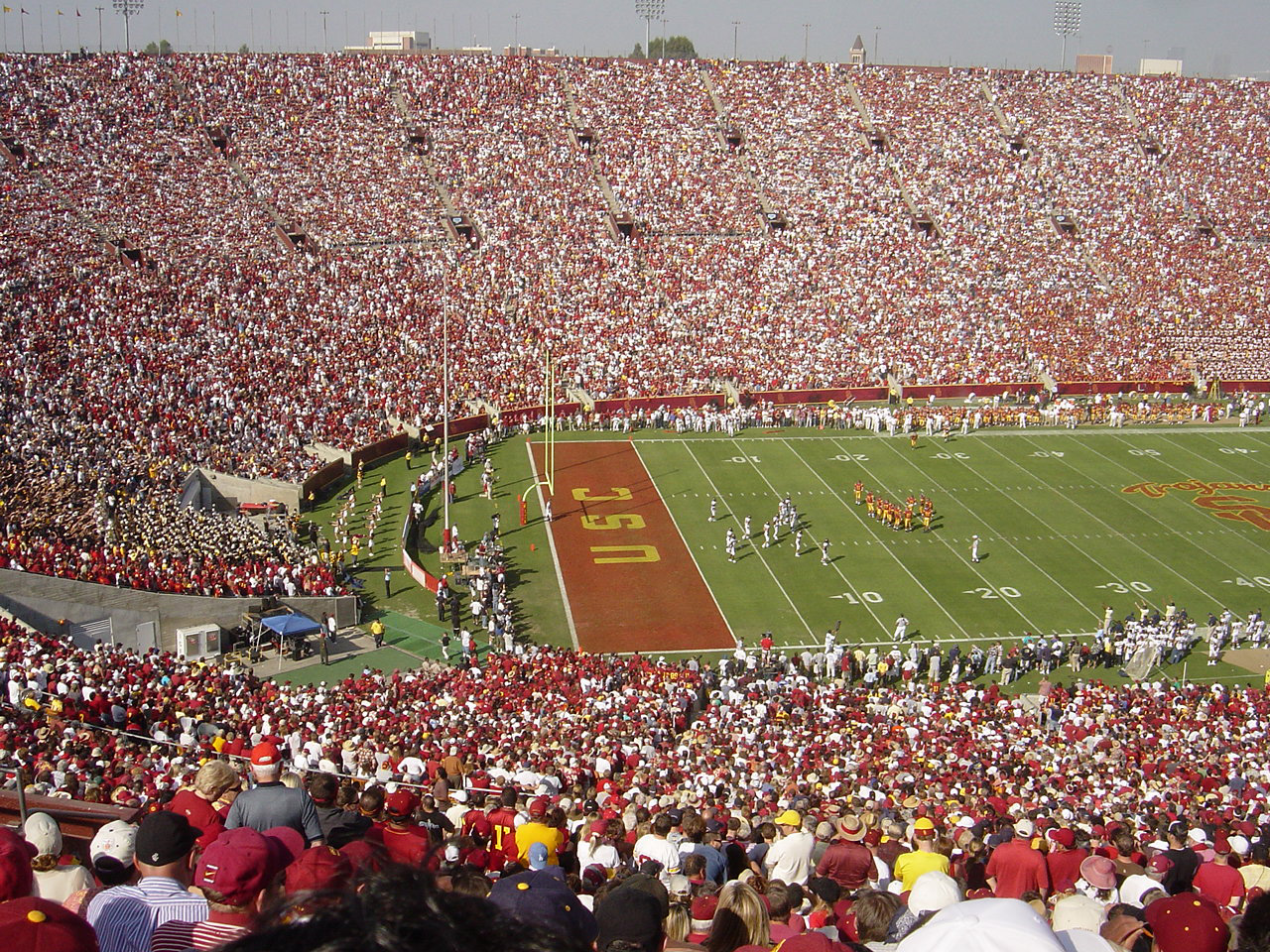
California at USC before the first non-rivalry-game sell out at the Los Angeles Coliseum in 52 years.

	1	2	3	4	Total
#7 Golden Bears	0	10	7	0	17
#1 Trojans	10	6	7	0	23

ESPN's College GameDay program visited the Los Angeles Coliseum for the first time in anticipation of a game between highly ranked and undefeated teams: 7th-ranked California had given USC its only loss in the 2003 season, resulting in the Trojans sharing the 2003 National Championship. It was the first time since 1968 that the teams met when both were ranked and it also was the highest-ranked Cal squad USC had faced since 1952, also the last time the two programs were ranked in the top ten. The Cal Golden Bears, led by Coach Jeff Tedford, were already ranked their highest since 1991 and looking to earn one of the biggest victories in program history. The crowd was USC's largest crowd for a non-UCLA/Notre Dame rivalry game since the 1952 Cal game.

The game was tightly fought: Cal dominated the statistics, more than doubling USC's first downs (28–12) and total yards (424–205) while getting more plays (79–50) and possession time (37:11–22:49); Cal quarterback Aaron Rodgers had a career performance, tying an NCAA single game record by completing his first 23 passes and guiding the Golden Bears to a first-and-goal at the Trojan 9-yard line with 1:47 to play. However, in the key final series, under heavy crowd noise, the USC defense caused an incomplete pass, a sack by defensive tackle Manuel Wright, and two more incomplete passes to cause a loss of possession and effectively end the game.

The game was highly touted by the media, with both teams earning praise for their performances. Beyond the 2004 season, the game marked a turning point in terms of crowd participation at the Coliseum, which thereafter garnered a reputation as a loud and difficult place to play for opposing teams.

The quality of play met expectations and had major ramifications for both programs that season: It would be the only game the Bears would lose in the regular season, costing them a shot at the national title and their first BCS bowl appearance, including what could've been their first appearance at the Rose Bowl since 1959; and it was the Trojans' toughest game of the season on their way to winning the national championship in the Orange Bowl.

=== Arizona State ===
	1	2	3	4	Total
#15 Sun Devils	0	7	0	0	7
#1 Trojans	14	28	0	3	45

The 15th-ranked Sun Devils, under Coach Dirk Koetter, were out to prove that they were a part of the national title picture and USC was out to prove it deserved its top-ranking after a series of close games to the Bay Area schools. USC quickly put the game out of reach, scoring 42 points in the first half behind 4 touchdown passes Matt Leinart and school single game record-tying 3 scoring grabs by Dwayne Jarrett. ASU quarterback Andrew Walter was rendered ineffective by the USC defense which achieved eight sacks, the same total ASU allowed in its previous five games. The decisive victory helped USC dispel concerns over its ability to dominate opponents. It was the second time the Trojans played before consecutive sellout crowds in the Coliseum, the first was in 1947 when the UCLA and Notre Dame rivalry games sold out, and the first against non-rival opponents.

At halftime USC recognized the 1939 Trojans as National Champions based on their #1 ranking in the contemporary Dickinson System, with surviving members of the team in attendance.

=== Washington ===
	1	2	3	4	Total
Huskies	0	0	0	0	0
#1 Trojans	0	10	21	7	38

The struggling Washington Huskies visited the Trojans for the 75th meeting in the series, with the Trojans dominating 38–0. The shutout was Washington's first since 1981, ending a national-best active streak of consecutive games without being shut out at 271. The victory put USC's winning streak at the Coliseum at 19, tying the school record set from 1931 to 1933. The game marked the first career start for Husky quarterback Isaiah Stanback.

=== Washington State ===
	1	2	3	4	Total
#1 Trojans	21	14	7	0	42
Cougars	0	0	12	0	12

USC became the first top-ranked team to visit Pullman, Washington, as the Trojans took on the Cougars at a sold-out Martin Stadium. The Trojans had lost in their previous visit to WSU, a 30–27 overtime game in 2002; since then the Trojans had gone 28–1. USC took the upper hand early on, taking a 14–0 lead before WSU's offense got on the field; by halftime, it was 35–0, as the Trojans had 289 yards and 16 first downs to the Cougars 54 and 4.

=== Oregon State ===
	1	2	3	4	Total
#1 Trojans	0	7	7	14	28
Beavers	6	7	0	7	20

The Trojans prevailed over the Beavers in a tight game in heavy fog at Reser Stadium in Corvallis, Oregon. After trailing 13–0 in second quarter, USC scored the next 28 points with a pivotal 65-yard scoring return by Reggie Bush in the 4th quarter with the game close at 14–13. Although the fog was thick enough at times to interfere with pass plays, USC tight end Dominique Byrd caught two touchdowns. It would be USC last win at Oregon State until 2013.

=== Arizona ===
	1	2	3	4	Total
Wildcats	3	0	6	0	9
#1 Trojans	0	14	21	14	49

USC clinched its third consecutive conference championship with a victory over the visiting Arizona Wildcats. LenDale White ran for 118 yards and three touchdowns while Matt Leinart passed for 280 yards and three more scores; the game guaranteed USC a spot in, at worst, the Rose Bowl

=== Notre Dame ===
	1	2	3	4	Total
Fighting Irish	7	3	0	0	10
#1 Trojans	3	14	10	14	41

After two weeks off, the Trojans were visited by the rival Fighting Irish, led by Coach Tyrone Willingham, in the inter-sectional rivalry for the Jeweled Shillelagh. The Irish had been inconsistent during the season, coming into the game at 6–4 having defeated strong teams and lost to weak teams. ESPN's College GameDay made its second-ever visit to the Coliseum. Matt Leinart passed for a career-high 400 yards and a school record-tying five touchdowns Saturday, leading the top-ranked Trojans to a 41–10 victory and adding a highlight performance to his ultimately successful Heisman campaign. Trailing 10–3, USC scored the final 38 points. Irish quarterback Brady Quinn completed 15-of-29 passes for 105 yards and a touchdown. The Trojans set a record for home wins (including pre-Coliseum), with their 21st victory; coincidentally, the previous team to defeat them at home were the Stanford Cardinal then-under Coach Willingham. USC set both a school home attendance (511,373) as well as the Pac-10 home per game average attendance (85,229) records. It was Willingham's third consecutive 31-point loss to USC in three seasons at Notre Dame; the Irish fired him the following Tuesday.

=== UCLA ===
	1	2	3	4	Total
#1 Trojans	10	10	3	6	29
Bruins	0	10	7	7	24

The top-ranked Trojans visited the Bruins for their annual crosstown rivalry game at the Rose Bowl in Pasadena, California on the 75th anniversary of the first USC-UCLA game in 1929. The Bruins, having come off a three-week break of consecutive bye weeks, came into the game as serious underdogs in the Victory Bell. Despite low expectations, the Bruins were able to shut down Leinart and give the Trojans a close game that was not decided until the final minutes. Reggie Bush scored on a pair of touchdown runs and totaled a career-best 335 all-purpose yards and placekicker Ryan Killeen kicked a USC and Pac-10 Conference game record 5 field goals. With the victory, USC sealed a bid for the BCS National Championship Game in the Orange Bowl.

The game against the Bruins was later vacated as a result of NCAA sanctions.

=== Oklahoma ===
	1	2	3	4	Total
#1 Trojans	14	24	10	7	55
#2 Sooners	7	3	0	9	19

The undefeated, top-ranked Trojans met the also undefeated, second-ranked Sooners in the 2005 BCS National Championship Game held at the FedEx Orange Bowl at Pro Player Stadium in Miami, Florida. The game was the first time two Heisman Trophy winners had faced each other in a college football game with Sooners quarterback and 2003 winner Jason White facing 2004 winner Matt Leinart. The game also featured four out of five of the 2004 Heisman finalists with Leinart, White, Reggie Bush and Sooner running back Adrian Peterson, the Heisman runner-up. Both USC and Oklahoma started and ended the season ranked No. 1 and No. 2 (wire-to-wire), respectively, in the AP and Coaches polls.

There was some controversy in the final team selections as the Auburn Tigers had also finished the regular season undefeated and won their bowl game, the Sugar Bowl, against the same Virginia Tech team USC defeated in the season opener; Auburn began the season ranked outside the top 15 and perhaps because of this they were unable to secure a spot in the national championship game, although they did tie Oklahoma at No. 2 in the AP poll at one point late in the season.

The Sooners scored first, having stopped an opening USC drive. USC scored next 28 points en route to a 38–10 halftime lead. The turning point in the game came early in the first quarter, with the game tied 7–7, Sooner Mark Bradley made a critical special teams error that resulted in USC gaining possession on the Oklahoma 6-yard-line; after that the game turned into a USC rout.

Leinart, the game's MVP, threw an Orange Bowl record (and at the time a USC record-tying) 5 touchdowns, including 3 to wide receiver Steve Smith, tying both an Orange Bowl and USC record; Ryan Killeen set the USC career scoring record with 329 career points; USC's 55 points tied its most ever in a bowl and were the most ever allowed in a bowl by Oklahoma. White threw for 24-of-36 for 244 yards with three interceptions and two touchdowns; Peterson ran for 82 yards on 25 carries. USC gained 525 total yards, averaging 8.3 yards per play, to the Sooners’ 372; OU ran off 13 more plays, 76 to 63, and held the ball for 35:06; however, Oklahoma had 5 turnovers to USC's none.

The championship game against the Sooners was later vacated as a result of NCAA sanctions and USC was stripped of the 2004 BCS title. The 2004 AP title, however, remains in place.

== Personnel ==
=== Coaching staff ===
Name	Position
Pete Carroll	Head coach, defensive coordinator
Norm Chow	Offensive coordinator
Ed Orgeron	Defensive line coach, recruiting coordinator
Tim Davis	Offensive line coach
Greg Burns	Secondary coach
Lane Kiffin	Wide receivers coach, pass game coordinator
Brennan Carroll	Tight ends coach
Rocky Seto	Linebackers coach
Ken Norton Jr.	Linebackers coach
Todd McNair	Running backs coach
Dennis Slutak	Special teams coordinator
Carl Smith	Quarterbacks coach

=== Roster ===
(as of August 10, 2010)
Wide receivers: 2 Steve Smith – Sophomore; 4 Whitney Lewis – Sophomore; 8 Dwayne Jarrett – Freshman; 9 Wil Smith* – (redshirt) Sophomore; 11 Christian Allen* – (redshirt) Freshman; 15 Jason Mitchell – (redshirt) Senior; 19 CJ Brewer – (redshirt) Junior; 26 Derrick Jones – Freshman; 27 John Zilka* – (redshirt) Freshman; 31 Will Buchanon – (redshirt) Junior; 82 Chris McFoy – (redshirt) Sophomore; Offensive line: 50 Will Collins – (redshirt) Freshman; 51 Fred Matua – (redshirt) Sophomore; 53 Jeff Byers – Freshman; 60 Drew Radovich – (redshirt) Freshman; 61 Ross Burruel* – (redshirt) Junior; 63 Travis Watkins – (redshirt) Senior; 64 Travis Draper – Freshman; 66 Chilo Rachal – Freshman; 67 Ryan Kalil – Sophomore; 69 Matt Spanos – (redshirt) Freshman; 70 Alatini Malu – Sophomore; 72 John Lanza* – (redshirt) Sophomore; 73 John Drake – Senior; 74 Winston Justice – Junior; 75 Kyle Williams – (redshirt) Sophomore; 77 Taitusi Lutui – Junior; 79 Sam Baker – (redshirt) Freshman; Tight ends: 43 Michael Stuart – (redshirt) Senior; 81 Alex Holmes – (redshirt) Senior; 83 Fred Davis – Freshman; 85 Kurt Katnik – (redshirt) Sophomore; 86 Dominique Byrd – Junior; 87 Nick Vanderboom* – (redshirt) Sophomore; 88 Owen Hanson* – (redshirt) Senior; 88 Jimmy Miller – Freshman; 89 Dale Thompson – Freshman	Quarterbacks: 16 Darren Vivian- Sophomore; 7 Conredge Holloway – Senior; 11 Matt Leinart – (redshirt) Junior; 13 Billy Hart – (redshirt) Junior; 16 Michael McDonald* – (redshirt) Freshman; 17 John David Booty – Sophomore; 18 Matt Cassel – (redshirt) Senior; Fullbacks: 35 Lee Webb – (redshirt) Senior; 37 David Kirtman – (redshirt) Junior; 40 Brandon Hancock – Junior; 41 Jody Adewale – (redshirt) Freshman; 47 Sean Kelly* – (redshirt) Freshman; 49 Mike Brittingham* – (redshirt) Sophomore; Running backs: 5 Reggie Bush – Sophomore; 22 Desmond Reed – (redshirt) Freshman; 21 LenDale White – Sophomore; 25 Chauncey Washington – Sophomore; 28 Andre Woodert* – (redshirt) Junior; 29 John Griffin* – (redshirt) Freshman; 34 Hershel Dennis – Junior; Defensive line: 9 Chris Barrett – (redshirt) Freshman; 49 Sedrick Ellis – (redshirt) Freshman; 52 LaJuan Ramsey – Junior; 54 Jeff Schweiger – Freshman; 84 Shaun Cody – Senior; 90 Frostee Rucker – (redshirt) Junior; 92 Manuel Wright – Sophomore; 93 Lawrence Miles – Freshman; 95 Travis Tofi – (redshirt) Sophomore; 96 Lawrence Jackson – (redshirt) Freshman; 97 Alex Morrow – (redshirt) Freshman; 98 Ryan Watson – (redshirt) Freshman; 99 Mike Patterson – Senior	Linebackers: 6 Matt Grootegoed – (redshirt) Senior; 41 Thomas Williams – (redshirt) Freshman; 42 Dallas Sartz – Junior; 45 Oscar Lua – (redshirt) Sophomore; 48 Marco Chavez* – (redshirt) Senior; 55 Keith Rivers – Freshman; 56 Ryan Powdrell – Junior; 58 Lofa Tatupu – (redshirt) Junior; 59 Collin Ashton* – (redshirt) Junior; Defensive backs: 17 Chris Bocage* – (redshirt) Senior; 18 John Walker – (redshirt) Junior; 20 Darnell Bing – Sophomore; 21 Justin Tolliver* – (redshirt) Junior; 22 Jim Abbott – Freshman; 23 Ronald Nunn – (redshirt) Senior; 24 Justin Wyatt – Junior; 25 Alex Gomez* – (redshirt) Junior; 26 Greg Farr* – (redshirt) Senior; 27 Jason Leach – (redshirt) Senior; 28 Terrell Thomas – (redshirt) Freshman; 29 Scott Ware – Junior; 30 Kevin Arbet – (redshirt) Senior; 36 Josh Pinkard – Freshman; 38 Brandon Ting – Sophomore; 39 Ryan Ting – Sophomore; 46 Eric Wright – (redshirt) Freshman; Punters: 14 Tom Malone – Junior; Kickers: 16 Ryan Killeen – Senior; 19 Mario Danelo* – (redshirt) Freshman
An * indicates that the player is a "walk-on" (non-scholarship player).

== After the season ==
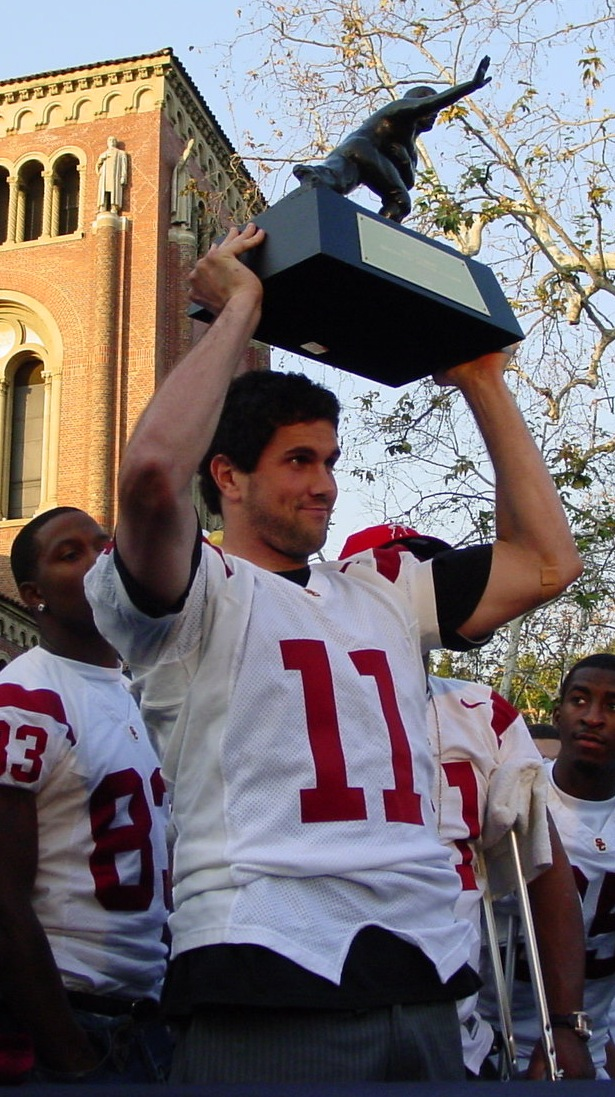
Matt Leinart hoists his Heisman Trophy at a 2005 campus rally

=== Coaching moves ===
After the regular season, the University of Mississippi hired USC assistant head coach Ed Orgeron, who also served as defensive line coach and recruiting coordinator, to be the new head coach of the Ole Miss Rebels football team. Although hired on December 16, 2004, he remained with USC through the Orange Bowl.

=== Awards ===
Quarterback Matt Leinart was awarded the Heisman Trophy as the most outstanding collegiate football player in the United States, with teammate Reggie Bush coming in 5th place.

A school-record 6 Trojans were awarded All-American first team honors in 2004: Matt Leinart, RB Reggie Bush, DE Shaun Cody, LB Matt Grootegoed, DT Mike Patterson and LB Lofa Tatupu. Wide receiver Dwayne Jarrett, offensive tackle Sam Baker and defensive end Lawrence Jackson were named to the Freshman All-American first team. In addition to winning the Heisman Trophy, Matt Leinart also won the Walter Camp Award and was named the AP Player of the Year.

In conference, Matt Leinart and Reggie Bush were named 2004 Pac-10 Co-Offensive Players of the Year, while DE-DT Shaun Cody was Pac-10 Co-Defensive Player of the Year; it marked the first time teammates had ever shared the honors on one side of the ball, the third time a school had won both offensive and defensive players of the year, and it was Leinart's second consecutive year being named the Offensive Player of the Year—making him the fourth to do so. Dating back to former Trojan QB Carson Palmer's 2002 season, it was the third year in a row that a Trojan was named the Pac-10 Offensive Player of the Year. All three players made the All-Pac-10 first team, with Bush making the team as both a running back and punt returner; they were joined by Mike Patterson, Matt Grootegoed, Lofa Tatupu and P Tom Malone. Making the second team where RB LenDale White, OT Sam Baker and S Darnell Bing, and honorable mentions to TE Dominique Byrd, TE Alex Holmes, WR Dwayne Jarrett, S Jason Leach, LB Dallas Sartz, DT Manuel Wright and CB Justin Wyatt.

Coach Pete Carroll was named the National Quarterback Club College Coach of the Year, as well as a finalist for the Bear Bryant and Eddie Robinson Coach of the Year Awards semifinalist, and was named the ESPN.com Pac-10 Coach of the Year.

=== NCAA investigation and sanctions ===
In June 2010, the NCAA imposed sanctions on USC as a result of an investigation into the football program. One of the major focuses was improper gifts given to Reggie Bush.

The NCAA found that Bush had received gifts from sports agents Lloyd Lake and Michael Michaels from at least December 2004 in violation of NCAA rules of amateurism. As a result, USC was placed on four years' probation and forced to vacate its last two wins of the 2004 season as well as all of its wins in the 2005 season. It was also banned from bowl games in 2010 and 2011 and lost 30 scholarships over three years. Running backs coach Todd McNair was banned from off-campus recruiting for one year after the NCAA determined he'd known about Bush's dealings with the agents. The NCAA also forced USC to permanently disassociate itself from Bush. However, USC lifted the restrictions related to Reggie Bush in 2020, welcoming him back to the program.

The vacated games included the Trojans' Orange Bowl win. On June 6, 2011, the BCS officially vacated USC's 2004 National Championship. The AP released a statement saying that USC will keep its 2004 AP title. The university filed an appeal of the sanctions which was later denied by the NCAA.

Reggie Bush would eventually have his USC career statistics and 2005 Heisman Trophy Award reinstated. Nevertheless, USC still has not managed to get back the things which the NCAA stripped the team of for this season, including the national title.
