= 2004 All-America college football team =

Official list of the best college football players of 2004

The 2004 All-America college football team is composed of the following All-America teams: Associated Press (AP), Football Writers Association of America (FWAA), American Football Coaches Association (AFCA), Walter Camp Football Foundation, The Sporting News, Sports Illustrated, Pro Football Weekly, ESPN, CBS Sports, College Football News, and Rivals.com.

The All-America college football team is an honor given annually to the best American college football players at their respective positions. The original usage of the term All-America seems to have been to such a list selected by Caspar Whitney in 1889. The NCAA officially recognizes All-Americans selected by the AP, AFCA, FWAA, SN, and the WCFF to determine consensus All-Americans.

Thirteen players were recognized as consensus All-Americans for 2004, 8 of them unanimously. Unanimous selections are followed by an asterisk (*)

2004 Consensus All-Americans
Name	Position	Year	University
Matt Leinart	Quarterback	Junior	USC
Adrian Peterson*	Running back	Freshman	Oklahoma
J. J. Arrington	Running back	Senior	California
Braylon Edwards*	Wide receiver	Senior	Michigan
Taylor Stubblefield	Wide receiver	Senior	Purdue
Heath Miller*	Tight end	Junior	Virginia
Alex Barron*	Offensive line	Senior	Florida State
Jammal Brown*	Offensive line	Senior	Oklahoma
Elton Brown	Offensive line	Senior	Virginia
David Baas	Offensive line	Senior	Michigan
Ben Wilkerson	Center	Senior	LSU
Erasmus James	Defensive line	Senior	Wisconsin
David Pollack	Defensive line	Senior	Georgia
Shaun Cody	Defensive line	Senior	USC
Marcus Spears	Defensive line	Senior	LSU
Derrick Johnson*	Linebacker	Senior	Texas
Matt Grootegoed	Linebacker	Senior	USC
A. J. Hawk	Linebacker	Junior	Ohio State
Antrel Rolle*	Defensive back	Senior	Miami (FL)
Marlin Jackson	Defensive back	Senior	Michigan
Carlos Rogers	Defensive back	Senior	Auburn
Ernest Shazor	Defensive back	Senior	Michigan
Thomas Davis Sr.	Defensive back	Junior	Georgia
Mike Nugent*	Kicker	Senior	Ohio State
Brandon Fields	Punter	Sophomore	Michigan State
Reggie Bush	Return Specialist	Sophomore	USC

== Offense ==
=== Quarterback ===
- Matt Leinart, Southern California (AP-1, AFCA, WCFF, ESPN, Rivals)
- Alex Smith, Utah (FWAA, SN, SI, PFW, CBS, CFN, AP-2, WCFF-2)
- Jason White, Oklahoma (AP-3)

=== Running backs ===
- Adrian Peterson, Oklahoma (AP-1, AFCA, FWAA, SN, WCFF, SI, PFW, CBS, CFN, Rivals)
- J. J. Arrington, California (AP-1, FWAA, SN, WCFF-2, SI, ESPN, CBS)
- Cedric Benson, Texas (WCFF, SI, ESPN, CFN, Rivals, AP-2)
- Cadillac Williams, Auburn (AFCA, AP-2)
- DeAngelo Williams, Memphis (PFW, AP-3)
- Jamario Thomas, North Texas (CBS, AP-3)
- Reggie Bush, USC (WCFF-2)

=== Fullback ===
- Brian Leonard, Rutgers (PFW)

=== Wide receivers ===
- Braylon Edwards, Michigan (AP-1, AFCA, FWAA, SN, WCFF, SI, PFW, ESPN, CBS, CFN, Rivals)
- Taylor Stubblefield, Purdue (AP-1, FWAA, SN, WCFF, ESPN, CBS, Rivals)
- Mark Clayton, Oklahoma (AFCA, AP-2, WCFF-2)
- Roddy White, UAB (PFW, AP-3)
- Dante Ridgeway, Ball State (CFN, AP-2, WCFF-2)
- Mike Hass, Oregon State (AP-3)

=== Tight end ===
- Heath Miller, Virginia (AP-1, AFCA, FWAA, SN, WCF, SI, PFW, ESPN, CBS, CFN, Rivals)
- Alex Smith, Stanford (AP-2, WCFF-2)
- Trey Haverty, Texas Tech (AP-3)

=== Linemen ===
- Jammal Brown, Oklahoma (AP-1, AFCA, FWAA, SN, WCFF, SI, PFW, ESPN, CBS, CFN, Rivals)
- Alex Barron, Florida State (AP-1, AFCA, FWAA, SN, WCFF, ESPN, CBS, CBS, CFN, Rivals)
- Elton Brown, Virginia (AP-1, AFCA, SN, WCFF, SI, ESPN, CBS, Rivals)
- David Baas, Michigan (AP-1, FWAA, WCFF, CBS)
- Chris Kemoeatu, Utah (FWAA, SI, PFW, CBS, CFN, AP-2)
- Vince Carter, Oklahoma (FWAA, WCFF, CBS, ESPN)
- Michael Muñoz, Tennessee (AP-1, AFCA, WCFF-2)
- Greg Eslinger, Minnesota (FWAA)
- Sam Mayes, Oklahoma State (SN, AP-3)
- Marcus McNeill, Auburn (SI, CBS, AP-2, WCFF-2)
- Marvin Philip, California (SI, AP-2)
- Adam Snyder, Oregon (ESPN)
- D'Brickashaw Ferguson, Virginia (PFW)
- Dan Buenning, Wisconsin (PFW, AP-2)
- Mark Setterstrom, Minnesota (Rivals)
- Wesley Britt, Alabama (CFN, AP-3)
- Daryn Colledge, Boise State (CFN)
- Jason Brown, North Carolina (PFW)
- Sam Baker, Southern California (CBS)
- Jonathan Scott, Texas (AP-2)
- Max Jean-Gilles, Georgia (WCFF-2)
- Logan Mankins, Fresno State (WCFF-2)
- Rob Petitti, Pittsburgh (AP-3)
- Travis Leffew, Louisville (AP-3)

=== Center ===
- Ben Wilkerson, LSU (AFCA, SN, AP-3, WCFF-2)

== Defense ==
=== Linemen ===
- Erasmus James, Wisconsin, (AP-1, AFCA, FWAA, WCFF, PFW, ESPN, CBS, CFN, Rivals)
- David Pollack, Georgia (AP-1, AFCA, WCFF, SI, PFW, ESPN, CFN)
- Shaun Cody, Southern California (AP-1, FWAA, WCFF, SI, ESPN, CBS)
- Marcus Spears, LSU (AP-1, AFCA, WCFF, CFN)
- Johnathan Goddard, Marshall (FWAA, CBS, CFN, AP-2, WCFF-2)
- Dan Cody, Oklahoma (FWAA, AP-2, WCFF-2)
- Mathias Kiwanuka, Boston College (AFCA, SN, Rivals, AP-3)
- Ryan Riddle, California (SN, SI, AP-2, WCFF-2)
- Mike Patterson, Southern California (SN, SI, Rivals, AP-3)
- Jesse Mahelona, Tennessee (SN)
- Travis Johnson, Florida State (PFW, ESPN, CBS, Rivals, AP-3)
- Luis Castillo, Northwestern (PFW)
- Matt Roth, Iowa (AP-2, WCFF-2)
- Jonathan Babineaux, Iowa (AP-3)

=== Linebackers ===
- Derrick Johnson, Texas (AP-1, AFCA, FWAA, SN, WCFF, SI, PFW, ESPN, CBS, CFN, Rivals)
- Matt Grootegoed, Southern California (AP-1, AFCA, WCFF)
- A. J. Hawk, Ohio State (AP-1, SN, WCFF, SI, CBS, Rivals)
- Kevin Burnett, Tennessee (AFCA, AP-2)
- Michael Boley, Southern Mississippi (FWAA, AP-2, WCFF-2)
- Lofa Tatupu, Southern California (SI, AP-3)
- Ahmad Brooks, Virginia (SN, PFW, AP-2, WCFF-2)
- Channing Crowder, Florida (ESPN)
- Ernie Sims, Florida State (ESPN)
- Chad Greenway, Iowa (PFW)
- Spencer Havner, UCLA (CBS, CFN, WCFF-2)
- Leroy Hill, Clemson (Rivals, AP-3)
- D'Qwell Jackson, Maryland (CFN)
- Barrett Ruud, Nebraska (AP-3)

=== Defensive backs ===
- Antrel Rolle, Miami (FL) (AP-1, AFCA, FWAA, SN, WCFF, SI, PFW, Rivals)
- Carlos Rogers, Auburn (AP-1, FWAA, WCFF, SI, ESPN, CBS, CFN, Rivals)
- Marlin Jackson, Michigan, (AP-1, AFCA, SN, FWAA, ESPN, WCFF-2)
- Ernest Shazor, Michigan (AP-1, FWAA, WCFF, SI, ESPN, CBS, CFN, Rivals)
- Thomas Davis Sr., Georgia (AFCA, SN, WCFF, PFW, CFN, Rivals, AP-2)
- Corey Webster, LSU (AFCA, SN, AP-2, WCFF-2)
- Junior Rosegreen, Auburn (SI, CBS, AP-2)
- Mitch Meeuwsen, Oregon State (ESPN, AP-3)
- Eric Green, Virginia Tech (PFW)
- Jim Leonhard, Wisconsin (PFW)
- Morgan Scalley, Utah (CBS, AP-2)
- Adam "Pacman" Jones, West Virginia (CFN)
- Brandon Payne, New Mexico (WCFF-2)
- Jim Leonhard, Wisconsin (WCFF-2)
- Jamaal Brimmer, UNLV (AP-3)
- Charles Gordon, Kansas (AP-3)
- Jason Allen, Tennessee (AP-3)

== Special teams ==
=== Kicker ===
- Mike Nugent, Ohio State (AP-1, AFCA, FWAA, SN, WCFF, SI, PFW, ESPN, CBS, CFN, Rivals)
- Tyler Jones, Boise State (AP-2, WCFF-2)
- Andrew Wellock, Eastern Michigan (AP-3)

=== Punter ===
- Brandon Fields, Michigan State (AP-1, FWAA, WCFF, SI, CBS, CFN)
- Matt Payne, BYU (AFCA, SN, Rivals, AP-2)
- John Torp, Colorado (ESPN)
- Daniel Sepulveda, Baylor (PFW, AP-3, WCFF-2)

=== Returners ===
- Reggie Bush, Southern California (AP-1[All-Purpose], AFCA, FWAA, SN-PR, SI-All-Purpose, ESPN, CBS, CFN, Rivals-Utility)
- Devin Hester, Miami (FL) (SN-KR, WCFF)
- Ashlan Davis, Tulsa (SI-KR, PFW-KR, Rivals-KR, WCFF-2)
- Ted Ginn Jr., Ohio State (SI-PR, PFW-PR, Rivals-PR, AP-3)
- Chad Owens, Hawaii (AP-2)

== See also ==
- 2005 All-Atlantic Coast Conference football team
- 2004 All-Big Ten Conference football team
- 2004 All-Big 12 Conference football team
- 2004 All-Pacific-10 Conference football team
- 2004 All-SEC football team
