= Sedrick Ellis =

American football player (born 1985)

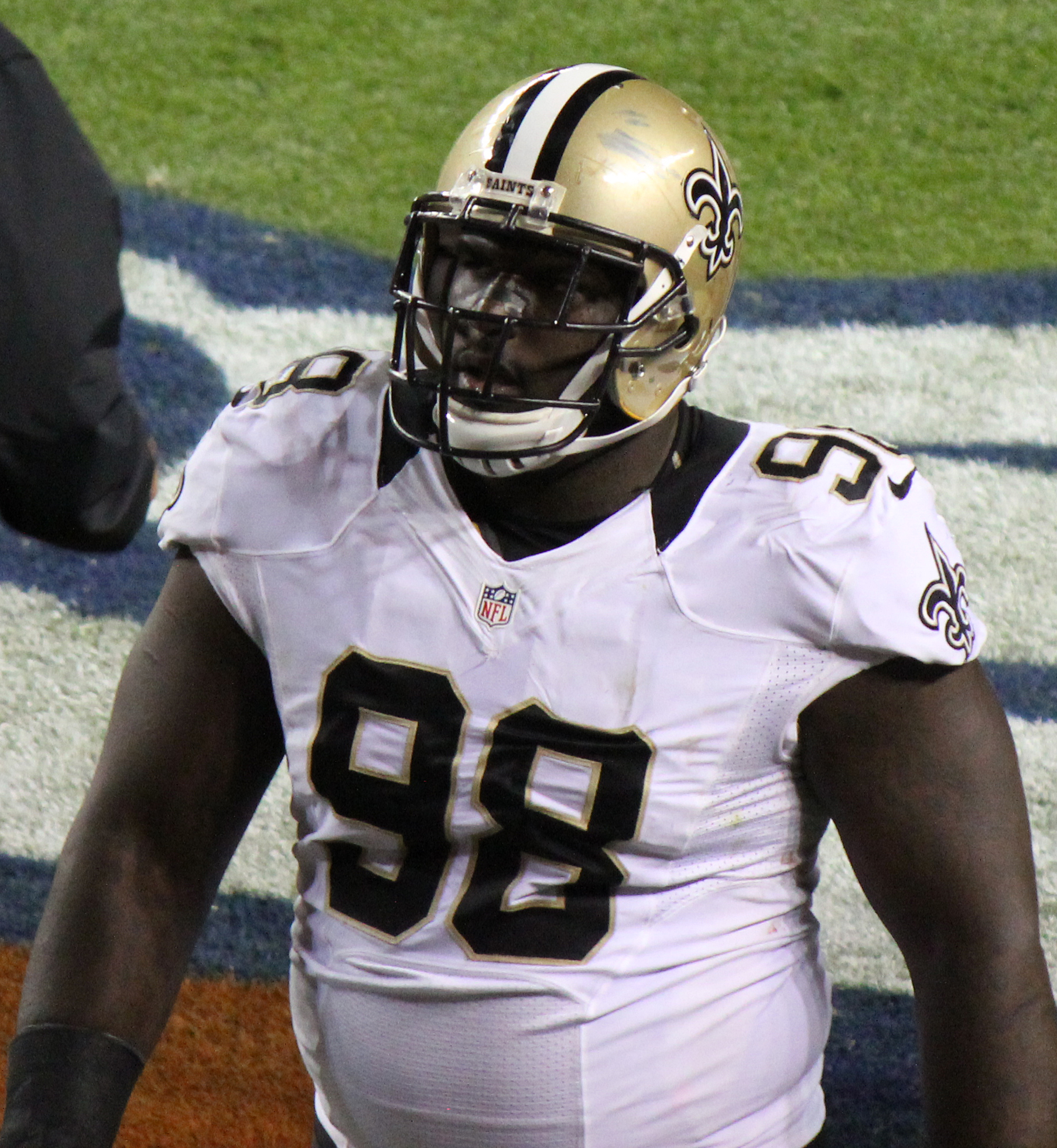
- Ellis with the New Orleans Saints in 2012

No. 98
- Position: Defensive tackle

Personal information
- Born: July 9, 1985 (age 41); Los Angeles, California, U.S.
- Listed height: 6 ft 1 in (1.85 m)
- Listed weight: 307 lb (139 kg)

Career information
- High school: Chino (CA)
- College: USC (2003–2007)
- NFL draft: 2008: 1st round, 7th overall pick

Career history
- New Orleans Saints (2008–2012); Chicago Bears (2013)*
- * Offseason or practice squad member only

Awards and highlights
- Super Bowl champion (XLIV); PFWA All-Rookie Team (2008); Unanimous All-American (2007); Pac-10 Defensive Player of the Year (2007); 2× Morris Trophy (2006, 2007); 2× First-team All-Pac-10 (2006, 2007)

Career NFL statistics
- Total tackles: 173
- Sacks: 12.5
- Forced fumbles: 2
- Fumble recoveries: 1
- Stats at Pro Football Reference

Sedrick Dwayne Ellis (born July 9, 1985) is an American former professional football player who was a defensive tackle in the National Football League (NFL). He played college football for the University of Southern California (USC), and earned unanimous All-American honors. He was selected by the New Orleans Saints seventh overall in the 2008 NFL draft.

== Early life ==
Ellis was born in Chino, California. Ellis prepped at Chino High School. He was involved with teams that went to back to back CIF title games 2000, 2001. Ellis, along with teammate Chris McFoy, who was on these Chino teams, played in the NFL. While in high school Ellis played defensive tackle and fullback in goal line situations.

== College career ==
Ellis attended the University of Southern California, where he played for coach Pete Carroll's USC Trojans football team from 2003 to 2007. As an underclassman, he learned under All-American Mike Patterson Ellis finished his redshirt junior season at USC during the 2006 season. He was first team coaches and Rivals.com All-Pac-10 conference, first-team College Football News All-American and won the Morris Trophy. Ellis was a major force in USC's victory over then-No. 3 Michigan in the 2007 Rose Bowl, recording a season-high seven tackles, a sack and a pass deflection. Following the performance, Ellis considered making the jump to the NFL in the 2007 NFL draft but decided to come back for his senior season and would go pro in 2008; part of his decision to stay was tied to classmate and highly touted defensive lineman Lawrence Jackson.

Bench pressing more than 500 pounds, he was the strongest player on the Trojans roster and was named one of the "Pac-10's Top 10 Players" by Sports Illustrated going into the 2007 season. At the end of the 2007 season, Ellis was voted the Pacific-10 Conference Defensive Player of the Year by league coaches, and was selected to the all-conference first team.

Ellis was recognized as a unanimous first-team All-American, having received first-team honors from the Associated Press, American Football Coaches Association, Football Writers Association of America, Walter Camp Football Foundation and The Sporting News, SI.com, Rivals.com.

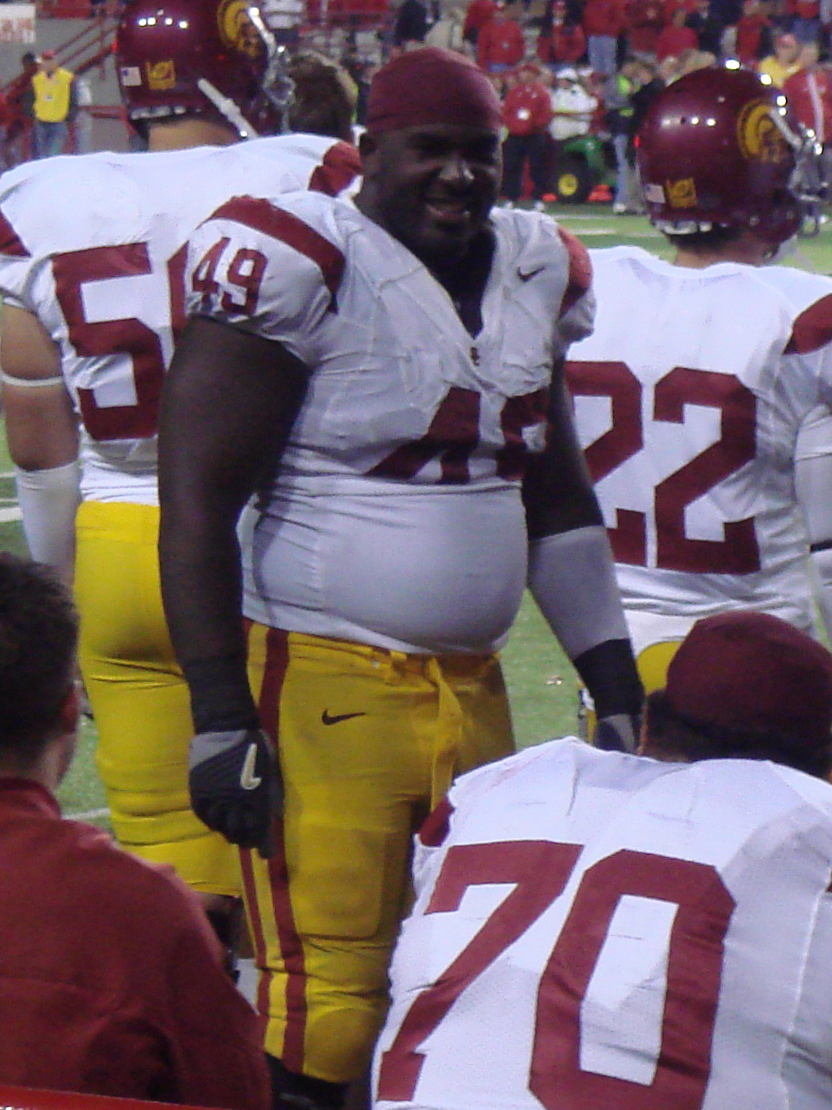
Ellis on the sidelines while playing for Southern California

Although Ellis was the strongest person on the 2007 Trojans and only the third player under Pete Carroll's Trojan tenure to lift over 500 lb (230 kg), he had only started lifting weights since he was 15 (10 years as of 2010) because his father would not allow him to lift at a younger age. In addition to benching a team-best 510 lb (230 kg), at the 2007 spring pro day Ellis hoisted 225 lb 42 times. Because of his strength, the Trojans had to purchase a set of 200-pound dumbbells for their weight room just to accommodate him (the previous high were 160s); Ellis would do sets of eight reps on the incline bench with the 200s.

== Professional career ==
Pre-draft measurables
Height	Weight	Arm length	Hand span	40-yard dash	10-yard split	20-yard split	20-yard shuttle	Three-cone drill	Vertical jump	Broad jump	Bench press
6 ft 0 1/2 in (1.84 m)	309 lb (140 kg)	33 in (0.84 m)	9 in (0.23 m)	5.05 s	1.69 s	2.91 s	4.73 s	7.78 s	30.0 in (0.76 m)	8 ft 9 in (2.67 m)	36 reps
All values from NFL Combine/USC Pro Day

Bench Press: 440 lb (200 kg); Squat: 560 lb (250 kg)

=== New Orleans Saints ===
Ellis was selected by the New Orleans Saints in the first round with the seventh overall pick in the 2008 NFL draft. The Saints original draft spot was 10th, but they traded up with the New England Patriots. The teams swapped first round picks, the Saints gave up their third round selection (78th) and the Pats gave back their fifth round selection (164th). The Patriots used the tenth pick to select linebacker Jerod Mayo.

Initially, New Orleans attempted to trade up for LSU DT Glenn Dorsey, whom they had valued higher than Ellis. They had purportedly offered a deal to the Kansas City Chiefs which included their first- and second-round picks and their first-round pick in the 2009 NFL draft but the Chiefs decided to draft Dorsey instead.

In New Orleans, Ellis was reunited with Saints defensive line coach Ed Orgeron, who was his assistant coach at USC for his freshman year and responsible for recruiting him. Extended negotiations over contract details, not uncommon with high draft picks, led the defensive tackle to miss six days and 12 practices of training camp until a contract was agreed to on July 29. His initial five-year contract is worth a maximum value of $49 million, with $19.5 million in guarantees; however portions are based on hard-to-reach incentives that may bring the realized value of the agreement lower.

==== 2008 season ====
Ellis started and played 13 regular season games in his rookie season for the Saints, who finished 8-8. Sedrick recorded 30 tackles (20 solo) and 4 sacks.

==== 2009 season ====
Ellis started and played 10 regular season games in his second season with the Saints, who finished 13-3 and went on to win Super Bowl XLIV. He recorded 34 tackles (26 solo) and 2 sacks in the regular season. Ellis started at Defensive Tackle for the Saints in the Super Bowl, recording three tackles.

==== 2010 season ====
Ellis started and played in all 16 regular season games for the Saints for the first time in his NFL career, recording 44 tackles (30 solo), which marked a career high. Ellis also led all Saints defenders with 6 sacks on the year. New Orleans finished 11-5, good for 2nd place in the NFC South. Ellis started at defensive tackle in the Saints' Wild Card playoff loss to the Seattle Seahawks, recording 3 total tackles.

==== 2011 season ====
Ellis started all but one game during the Saints 13-3 run in 2011 that resulted in another NFC South title. He had 32 tackles (including playoffs) and four passes defended.

==== 2012 season ====
Ellis started and played in all 16 regular season games, recording 36 tackles (23 solo).

=== Chicago Bears ===
On June 11, 2013, Ellis signed a one-year contract with the Chicago Bears, a team that had a top five defense in yards and point-per-game allowed the year prior.

On July 25, 2013, Ellis did not report to training camp and advised the Bears of his intention to retire from the NFL.

== Career statistics ==
=== NFL ===
Year	Team	GP	Tackles				Fumbles			Interceptions					
Year	Team	GP	Cmb	Solo	Ast	Sck	FF	FR	Yds	Int	Yds	Avg	Lng	TD	PD
2008	NO	13	30	20	10	4.0	0	0	0	0	0	0.0	0	0	5
2009	NO	10	34	26	8	2.0	0	1	7	0	0	0.0	0	0	2
2010	NO	16	44	30	14	6.0	2	0	0	0	0	0.0	0	0	2
2011	NO	15	29	9	20	0.5	0	0	0	0	0	0.0	0	0	4
2012	NO	16	36	13	23	0.0	0	0	0	0	0	0.0	0	0	1
Career		70	173	98	75	12.5	2	1	0	0	0	0.0	0	0	14

=== College ===
Season	Team	Games		Tackles					Defense						
Season	Team	GP	GS	Cmb	Solo	Ast	TfL	Sck	PD	Int	FF	FR	QBH	Blk	TD
2003	USC	1	0	0	0	0	0	0.0	0	0	0	0	0	0	0
2004	USC	11	0	2	0	2	0	0.0	0	0	0	0	2	0	0
2005	USC	13	13	50	28	22	8	4.5	3	0	1	1	6	0	0
2006	USC	10	10	34	17	17	8	4.5	3	0	0	2	7	1	0
2007	USC	14	13	58	29	29	12.5	8.5	7	0	1	2	9	0	0
Career		48	36	144	74	70	28.5	17.5	13	0	2	5	24	1	0
