= Chino High School =

Location
- 5472 Park Place; Chino, California 91710; United States; 34°01′17″N 117°41′06″W

Information
- Type: Public high school
- Established: 1897
- School district: Chino Valley Unified School District
- Principal: Jonathan Cervantes
- Teaching staff: 89.31 (FTE)
- Grades: 9-12
- Enrollment: 2,009 (2023–2024)
- Student to teacher ratio: 22.49
- Campus: Suburban
- Colors: Royal blue and white
- Nickname: Cowboys
- Rivals: Don Antonio Lugo High School
- Accreditation: WASC 3-year
- Test average: API 653 in 2008
- Newspaper: The Lariat
- Yearbook: El Chasqui
- Website: chinohigh.chino.k12.ca.us

Chino High School (CHS), located in Chino, California is one of the four regular high schools in the Chino Valley Unified School District. The school was established in 1897, making it one of the oldest schools in Southern California. Chino High moved from its original location in 1951 to its present location at Park Place and Benson Ave.

== Academics ==
In 2007, the rate of passing the English-Language Arts section of the California High School Exit Exam for sophomores was 76% and the rate of graduating seniors was approximately 70%. Dropout rates continue to stay low at less than 10% in 2008, Chino High School was recertified by the Western Association of Schools and Colleges for three years.

== Demographics ==
The demographic breakdown of the 2,498 students enrolled for the 2012-2013 school year was:

- Male - 49.0%
- Female - 51.0%
- Native American/Alaskan - 0.2%
- Asian/Pacific islander - 4.0%
- Black - 3.5%
- Hispanic - 75.4%
- White - 16.3%
- Multiracial - 0.6%

In addition, 57% of the students were eligible for free or reduced lunch.

== Athletics ==
Chino High School is a member of the California Interscholastic Federation Hacienda League in the southern section. Division 6

== Notable alumni ==
- Geoff Blum, professional baseball player.
- Sedrick Ellis, former NFL defensive tackle
- Jarron Gilbert, former NFL defensive end
- Justin Jacobs, professional baseball player
- Elita Loresca, Meteorologist for NBC 4 in Los Angeles, voted 9th "Hottest Weather Girl" by FHM Magazine
- Chris McFoy, former NFL wide receiver
- Greg Salas, former NFL wide receiver
- R. J. Stanford, former NFL cornerback
- Mark Vander Poel, former NFL offensive tackle
- Angela Williams, four times 100 meter NCAA champion at USC, world indoor 60 meter champion, current high school 100 meter record holder.
- Tony Zendejas, former NFL kicker
