= Ben Wilkerson =

American football player and coach (born 1982)

Las Vegas Raiders
- Title: Assistant offensive line coach

Personal information
- Born: November 22, 1982 (age 43); Port Arthur, Texas, U.S.
- Listed height: 6 ft 4 in (1.93 m)
- Listed weight: 310 lb (141 kg)

Career information
- Position: Center (No. 64, 67)
- High school: Hemphill (Hemphill, Texas)
- College: LSU (2001–2004)
- NFL draft: 2005: undrafted

Career history

Playing
- Cincinnati Bengals (2005–2006); Atlanta Falcons (2007–2008); Florida Tuskers (2009)

Coaching
- LSU (2010-2011) Graduate assistant; Grambling State (2012–2013) Offensive line coach; Chicago Bears (2015–2017) Assistant offensive line coach; New York Giants (2018–2021) Assistant offensive line coach; New York Jets (2022–2024) Assistant offensive line coach; Cleveland Browns (2025) Assistant offensive line coach; Las Vegas Raiders (2026–present) Assistant offensive line coach

Awards and highlights
- BCS national champion (2003); Rimington Trophy (2004) (Note: Co-winner with David Baas); Consensus All-American (2004); Second-team All-American (2003); First-team All-SEC (2004)

Career NFL statistics
- Games played: 32
- Stats at Pro Football Reference

Benjamin Lorenza Wilkerson (born November 22, 1982) is an American football coach and former player who is the assistant offensive line coach for the Las Vegas Raiders of the National Football League (NFL). He played as a center in the NFL for four seasons from 2005 to 2008. He played college football for the LSU Tigers, earning consensus All-American honors, and winning the Rimington Trophy. He signed with the Cincinnati Bengals as an undrafted free agent in 2005, and also played for the Atlanta Falcons, and the Florida Tuskers of the United Football League (UFL).

== Early life ==
Wilkerson was born in Port Arthur, Texas. He graduated from Hemphill High School in Hemphill, Texas.

== College career ==
He received an athletic scholarship to attend Louisiana State University, where he played for coach Nick Saban's LSU Tigers football team from 2001 to 2004. As a junior in 2003, he was a member of the Tigers' SEC Championship team that defeated the Oklahoma Sooners 21–14 to win the BCS National Championship. Following his senior 2004 season, he was recognized as a first-team All-Southeastern Conference (SEC) selection and a consensus first-team All-American, and was awarded the Rimington Trophy as the best college football center in the country.

== Professional career ==
Pre-draft measurables
Height	Weight
6 ft 3 1/2 in (1.92 m)	299 lb (136 kg)
Values from NFL Combine

Wilkerson was signed as an undrafted free agent in 2005 by the NFL's Cincinnati Bengals, and he was a member of the Bengals from 2005 to 2006, but appeared in only three games during the 2006 season. He also played for the NFL's Atlanta Falcons from 2007 to 2008, and appeared in twenty-nine games off the bench for the Falcons.

He was a member of the United Football League's Florida Tuskers for part of the 2009 season.

== Coaching career ==
=== LSU ===
Wilkerson served as an offensive graduate assistant for the LSU Tigers through the 2010 and 2011 football seasons under Les Miles.

=== Grambling State ===
He served as the offensive line coach at Grambling State University from 2012 to 2013.

=== North Shore Senior High School ===
Wilkerson was a PE teacher and assistant football and track coach at North Shore Senior High School in Texas during 2014.

=== Chicago Bears ===
On February 11, 2015, Wilkerson was hired by the Chicago Bears as their assistant offensive line coach.

=== New York Giants ===
On February 5, 2018, the New York Giants hired Wilkerson to serve as their assistant offensive line coach. Even with the coaching change in 2020, head coach Joe Judge decided to keep Wilkerson on the Giants staff in the same position. Wilkerson coached the team's offensive line when Dave DeGuglielmo missed their week 17 game against the Dallas Cowboys on January 3, 2021. He was not retained after the 2021 season.

=== New York Jets ===
Wilkerson was hired on March 7, 2022, by the New York Jets to be their assistant offensive line coach.

On January 29, 2025, Wilkerson and the Jets parted ways.

=== Cleveland Browns ===
On February 15, 2025, the Cleveland Browns hired Wilkerson to serve as their assistant offensive line coach.

=== Las Vegas Raiders ===
On March 1, 2026, it was announced that Wilkerson had been hired to serve as the assistant offensive line coach for the Las Vegas Raiders under head coach Klint Kubiak.

== Personal life ==
Wilkerson and his wife, Angi, have four children, Brianna, Isabella, Jordan, and Benjamin ll.
