= R. J. Stanford =

American football player (born 1988)

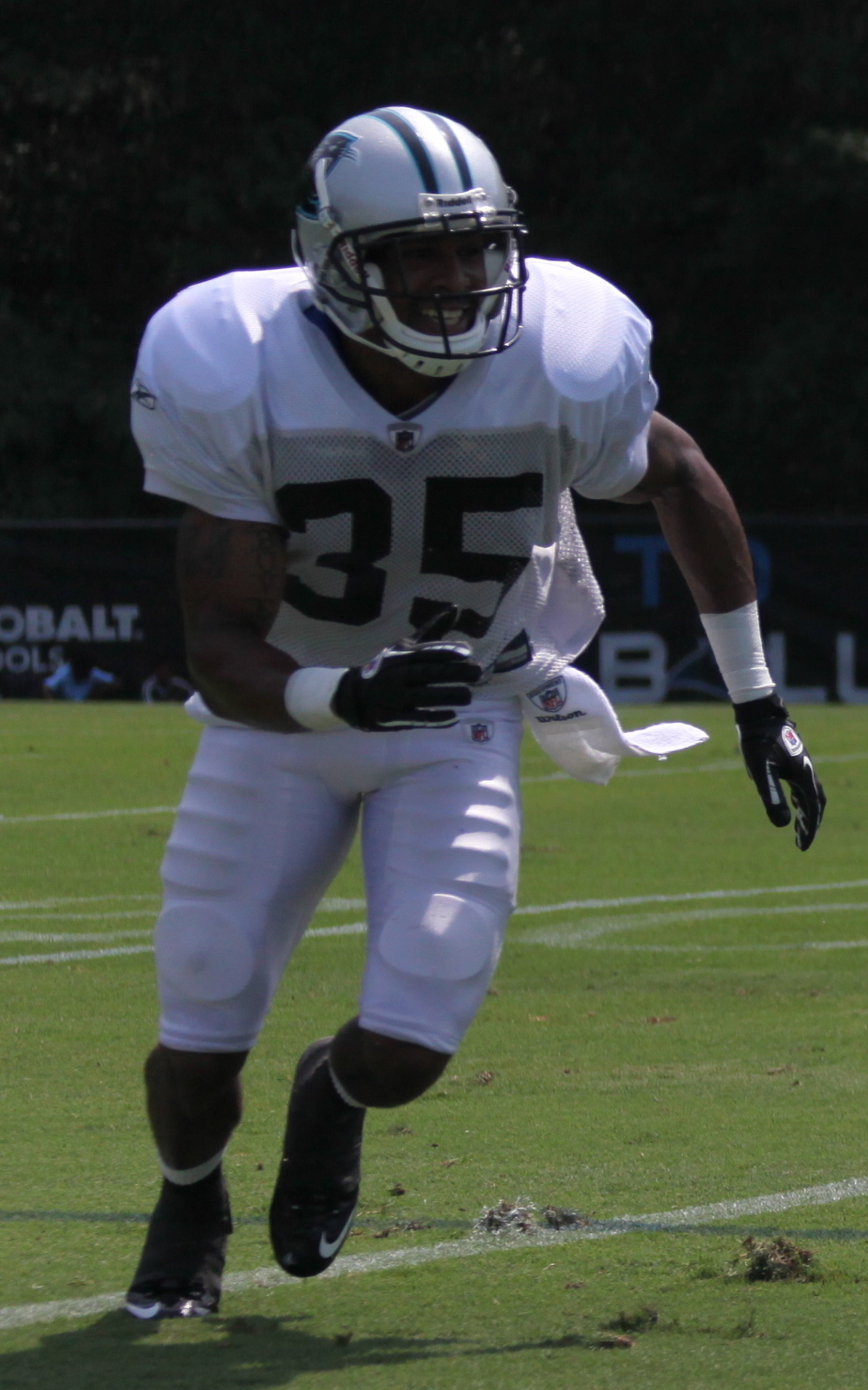
- Stanford with the Carolina Panthers in 2011

No. 25, 41
- Position: Cornerback

Personal information
- Born: May 6, 1988 (age 38); Inglewood, California, U.S.
- Listed height: 5 ft 10 in (1.78 m)
- Listed weight: 187 lb (85 kg)

Career information
- High school: Chino (Chino, California)
- College: Utah
- NFL draft: 2010: 7th round, 223rd overall pick

Career history
- Carolina Panthers (2010–2011); Miami Dolphins (2012–2013); Cincinnati Bengals (2014)*; Miami Dolphins (2014); Detroit Lions (2015)*
- * Offseason or practice squad member only

Career NFL statistics
- Total tackles: 51
- Pass deflections: 3
- Interceptions: 2
- Stats at Pro Football Reference

Raymond "R. J." Perry Stanford Jr. (born May 6, 1988) is an American former professional football player who was a cornerback in the National Football League (NFL). Stanford was selected by the Carolina Panthers in the seventh round of the 2010 NFL draft. He played college football for the Utah Utes. After retirement he became an agent in the United States Secret Service.

== Early life ==
He attended Chino High School in Chino, California. He was a first-team all C.I.F. and conference offensive player of the year in 2004-05. He carried the ball 233 times without a fumble as a senior, when he rushed for 1,800 yards and 28 touchdowns.

Considered a three-star recruit by Rivals.com, he was rated as the 16th best all-purpose back of his class.

== College career ==
While playing for the Utah Utes, he started at cornerback and at nickelback and played in 51 of 52 total games during his career, the lone exception being his college debut as a true freshman in 2006. Stanford began his college career as a running back before transitioning to the cornerback position midway through his freshman year.

== Professional career ==
Pre-draft measurables
Height	Weight	40-yard dash	10-yard split	20-yard split	20-yard shuttle	Three-cone drill	Vertical jump	Broad jump	Bench press
5 ft 10 1/8 in (1.78 m)	183 lb (83 kg)	4.42 s	1.59 s	2.59 s	4.38 s	6.80 s	37.5 in (0.95 m)	10 ft 11 in (3.33 m)	12 reps
All values from Pro Day

=== Carolina Panthers ===
Stanford was selected by the Carolina Panthers in the seventh round, 223rd overall of the 2010 NFL draft. He was waived by the Panthers on August 31, 2012.

=== Miami Dolphins (first stint) ===
He was claimed off waivers by the Miami Dolphins on September 1, 2012. He suffered a broken leg in a Week 14 matchup against the Pittsburgh Steelers on December 7, 2013.

=== Cincinnati Bengals ===
On March 24, 2014, Stanford signed a one-year deal worth $805,000 with the Cincinnati Bengals. The Bengals released Stanford on August 25, 2014.

=== Miami Dolphins (second stint) ===
Stanford signed with the Miami Dolphins on November 25, 2014.

=== Detroit Lions ===
On July 28, 2015, Stanford signed with the Detroit Lions.

== Personal life ==
Stanford appeared on Season 18 of American Ninja Warrior.
