= Ashlan Davis =

American football player (born 1983)

No. 14
- Position: Wide receiver / Return specialist

Personal information
- Born: February 15, 1983 (age 43); Mesquite, Texas, U.S.
- Listed height: 5 ft 9 in (1.75 m)
- Listed weight: 185 lb (84 kg)

Career information
- High school: Poteet (Mesquite)
- College: Tulsa
- NFL draft: 2006: undrafted

Career history
- Indianapolis Colts (2006)*; Montreal Alouettes (2006–2007); New York Jets (2008)*; Corpus Christi Sharks (2009); San Angelo Stampede Express (2010); West Texas Roughnecks (2011); Texas Revolution (2014)*
- * Offseason or practice squad member only

Awards and highlights
- Second-team All-American (2004); NCAA record for most kick return touchdowns in a season. (5); NCAA record for consecutive games with a kick return touchdown. (4)

Career CFL statistics
- Receptions: 36
- Receiving yards: 420
- Receiving TDs: 3
- Kickoff returns: 26
- Kickoff return yards: 554
- Stats at CFL.ca (archived)

Ashlan Davis (born February 15, 1983) is an American former professional football player. He was signed by the Indianapolis Colts as an undrafted free agent in 2007. He played college football for the Tulsa Golden Hurricane.

Davis was also a member of the Montreal Alouettes and New York Jets. He finished his career playing indoor football.

== Early life ==
Davis attended Poteet High School, where he was a three-year letterman in football. He was a starter for both his junior and senior seasons, at both Cornerback and Running back. In those seasons, he recorded a total of 11 interceptions. He was listed among Dave Campbell's Texas Football Magazine Top 300 Seniors.

== College career ==
Davis first attended Tyler Junior College where he would play for two seasons before transferring to the University of Tulsa. He started at Wide receiver his sophomore season, finishing the season with 34 receptions for 960 yards, and 11 touchdowns. He also had one punt return for touchdown. In 2004, he transferred to Tulsa. His junior year, he set multiple records for kickoff returns, including most kick return for a touchdown in a season with five and consecutive games with a kick return for touchdown with four. He also recorded 30 receptions for 462 yards and one touchdown. His senior season he recorded 35 receptions for 451 yards and five receiving touchdowns. While in college, he Communications major.

== Professional career ==
After going unselected in the 2006 NFL draft, Davis signed with the Indianapolis Colts on May 1, 2006. After spending time on the Colts practice squad, he was released and signed with the Montreal Alouettes of the Canadian Football League. He started 11 games for the Alouettes during the 2007 season. On June 10, 2008, he signed with the New York Jets. He was released by the team on July 7. On January 10, 2009, he was assigned to the Corpus Christi Sharks of af2.

== Personal life ==
Davis is the son of Darious and Carla Davis. His favorite NFL team was the Dallas Cowboys. His favorite NFL players are Terrell Owens and Randy Moss. His favorite sport to watch besides football is drag racing.
