= Elton Brown =

American football player (born 1982)

Norfolk State Spartans
- Title: Offensive line coach

Personal information
- Born: May 22, 1982 (age 44); Hampton, Virginia, U.S.
- Listed height: 6 ft 5 in (1.96 m)
- Listed weight: 338 lb (153 kg)

Career information
- Position: Offensive lineman (No. 61)
- High school: Hampton
- College: Virginia
- NFL draft: 2005: 4th round, 111th overall pick

Career history

Playing
- Arizona Cardinals (2005–2008); New York Sentinels (2009)

Coaching
- Phoebus HS (VA) (2013–2014) Offensive line coach; Warwick HS (VA) (2015–2016) Assistant head coach & offensive line coach; Apprentice (2018–2020) Assistant coach; Apprentice (2021–2024) Assistant head coach, offensive coordinator, & recruiting coordinator; Norfolk State (2025–present) Offensive line coach

Awards and highlights
- Consensus All-American (2004); First-team All-ACC (2004); Second-team All-ACC (2003); Jacobs Blocking Trophy (2003, 2004); Virginia Cavaliers Jersey No. 61 retired

Career NFL statistics
- Games played: 34
- Games started: 14
- Fumble recoveries: 1
- Stats at Pro Football Reference

Elton Gillett Brown (born May 22, 1982) is an American former professional football player who was a guard in the National Football League (NFL) for four seasons. He played college football for the University of Virginia, and was recognized as an All-American. The Arizona Cardinals chose him in the fourth round of the 2005 NFL draft, and he also played for the New York Sentinels of the United Football League (UFL). He currently is the assistant head coach and offensive coordinator for The Apprentice School in Newport News, Virginia.

== Early life ==
Brown was born in Hampton, Virginia. He has a brother named Scorpio Brown who played Wide receiver for the Baltimore Mariners, Richmond Raiders, and Harrisburg Stampede. He attended Hampton High School, where he was a standout player for the Hampton Crabbers high school football.

== College career ==
Brown accepted an athletic scholarship to attend the University of Virginia, where he played for coach Al Groh's Virginia Cavaliers football team from 2001 to 2004. As a senior in 2004, he was recognized as a first-team All-Atlantic Coast Conference (ACC) selection and a consensus first-team All-American. In recognition of his outstanding college football career, the Virginia athletic department retired his jersey, No. 61, on September 24, 2011.

== Professional career ==
The Arizona Cardinals selected Brown in the fourth round (111th pick overall) of the 2005 NFL draft, and he played for the Cardinals from 2005 to 2008. After four seasons with the Cardinals, Brown was cut on September 8, 2009. He had started fourteen of the thirty-four games he played for the Cardinals. He finished his professional playing career with the New York Sentinels of the UFL in 2009.

== Coaching career ==
Brown began his coaching career with Phoebus High School and Warwick High School before joining Apprentice. In 2025, after seven seasons, with the last four as assistant head coach, offensive coordinator, and recruiting coordinator, he joined Michael Vick at Norfolk State.
