= Super Agent =

- Presented by: Tony Gonzalez
- Starring: Shaun Cody
- Country of origin: United States

Original release
- Network: Spike TV
- Release: 2005

Super Agent is an American reality television series about nine sports agents competing to be selected for defensive lineman Shaun Cody. The series was shown on Spike TV in 2005.

In each episode the sports agents were given assignments that allowed them to demonstrate their skills and talents as agents for Cody as he deliberated on which agent would ultimately be hired to manage his multimillion-dollar American football career.

== Cast Members ==
- Starring: Shaun Cody, (himself), Blue Chip 2005 NFL Draft Prospect
- Host: Tony Gonzalez, NFL Tight end - Kansas City Chiefs
- Guest Host (episode 4): Simeon Rice, NFL Defensive end - Tampa Bay Buccaneers
- John Bermudez, Agent
- Justin Breece, Agent
- Scott Casterline, Agent
- Jeff Guerriero, Agent
- Harold Lewis, Agent
- Tim McIlwain, Agent
- Marlon Tucker, Agent
- Lisa Van Wagner, Agent
- Don West, Jr., Agent

== Director and producers ==
Directed by: Tony Gonzalez

Location producer: Bryan Bultz

Supervising producer: Brendan Carter

Executive producer: Rick de Oliveira

Executive producer: James DuBose

Supervising story producer: Kristian House
