= David Baas =

American football player (born 1981)

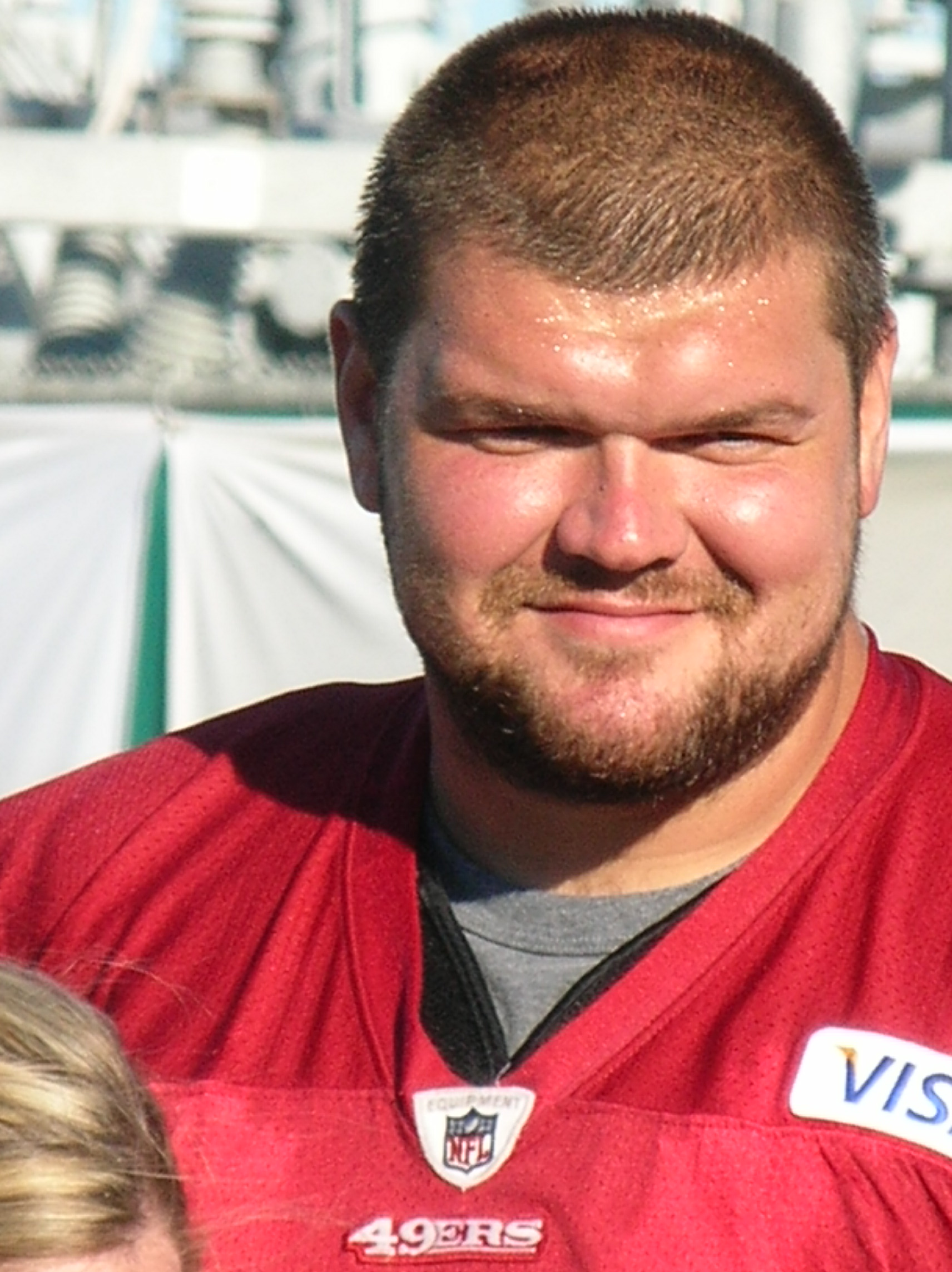
- Baas in 2010

No. 64
- Positions: Guard, center

Personal information
- Born: September 28, 1981 (age 45); Bixby, Oklahoma, U.S.
- Listed height: 6 ft 4 in (1.93 m)
- Listed weight: 312 lb (142 kg)

Career information
- High school: Riverview (Sarasota, Florida)
- College: Michigan (2000–2004)
- NFL draft: 2005: 2nd round, 33rd overall pick

Career history
- San Francisco 49ers (2005–2010); New York Giants (2011–2013)

Awards and highlights
- Super Bowl champion (XLVI); Rimington Trophy (2004) (Note: Co-winner with Ben Wilkerson); Consensus All-American (2004); Second-team All-American (2003); Big Ten Offensive Lineman of the Year (2004); 3× First-team All-Big Ten (2002–2004)

Career NFL statistics
- Games played: 122
- Games started: 84
- Fumble recoveries: 2
- Stats at Pro Football Reference

David Andrew Baas (born September 28, 1981) is an American former professional football player who was a guard and center in the National Football League (NFL). He played college football for the Michigan Wolverines, where he won the Rimington Trophy, and was recognized as a consensus All-American. He was selected by the San Francisco 49ers in the second round of the 2005 NFL draft. Baas also played for the New York Giants.

== Early life ==
Baas was born in Bixby, Oklahoma. He attended Riverview High School in Sarasota, Florida, and was a letterman in high school football and track and field for the Riverview Rams. In football, he was awarded USA Today All-USA honors. During his junior year, he recorded a school-record 70 pancake blocks.

== College career ==
Baas attended the University of Michigan, where he played for coach Lloyd Carr's Michigan Wolverines football team from 2001 to 2004. He earned first-team All-Big Ten Conference honors three times. He started at left guard until the middle of his senior season, when he was moved to center. As a senior in 2004, he was the Hugh H. Rader awardee as the Wolverines' best offensive lineman, a finalist for the Outland Trophy, given to college football's best interior lineman, and a co-recipient of the Rimington Trophy, awarded to college football's top center. He was also recognized as a consensus first-team All-American in 2004. He majored in general studies.

== Professional career ==
=== San Francisco 49ers ===
The 49ers drafted Baas in the second round (33rd overall) of the 2005 NFL Draft. He played in 13 games in 2005 and started in 5 of them. Baas' first game was in the historical Mexico City game on October 2 against the Arizona Cardinals as a special teams player. On December 4, he made his first start as a right guard against the same Cardinals team when Eric Heitmann was moved to center.

Baas played in all 16 games in 2006, mainly as a special teams player and as an extra eligible tackle on the offensive line.

In 2007, Baas started in 8 of the 15 games that he played in at right guard, after then-starter Justin Smiley was put on injured reserve with a shoulder injury.

He was re-signed to a one-year contract on April 13, 2010.

=== New York Giants ===
On July 29, 2011, Baas signed with the New York Giants as an unrestricted free agent. Baas was the starting center during Super Bowl XLVI in which the Giants defeated the New England Patriots.

In the August 18, 2013 preseason game against the Colts, David Baas sprained his MCL in the first quarter and underwent an MRI and additional tests. The Giants reported Baas could be out for 3–6 weeks. The Giants fell to the Colts 20–12 in the game. Due to injuries, Baas appeared in only 3 games for the Giants during the 2013 regular season, the last being a week 7 game against the Minnesota Vikings. In that game, he suffered a knee injury and was placed on injured reserve following the game.

On March 10, 2014, Baas was waived/failed physical from the Giants, designated as a post-June 1 cut. It was reported Baas may never play again due to neck and knee injuries.

== Personal ==
Baas is married to his wife, Elizabeth, and they reside in Lakewood Ranch, Florida.

While with the Giants, he was a resident of Ridgewood, New Jersey.
