= Shaun Cody =

American football player (born 1983)

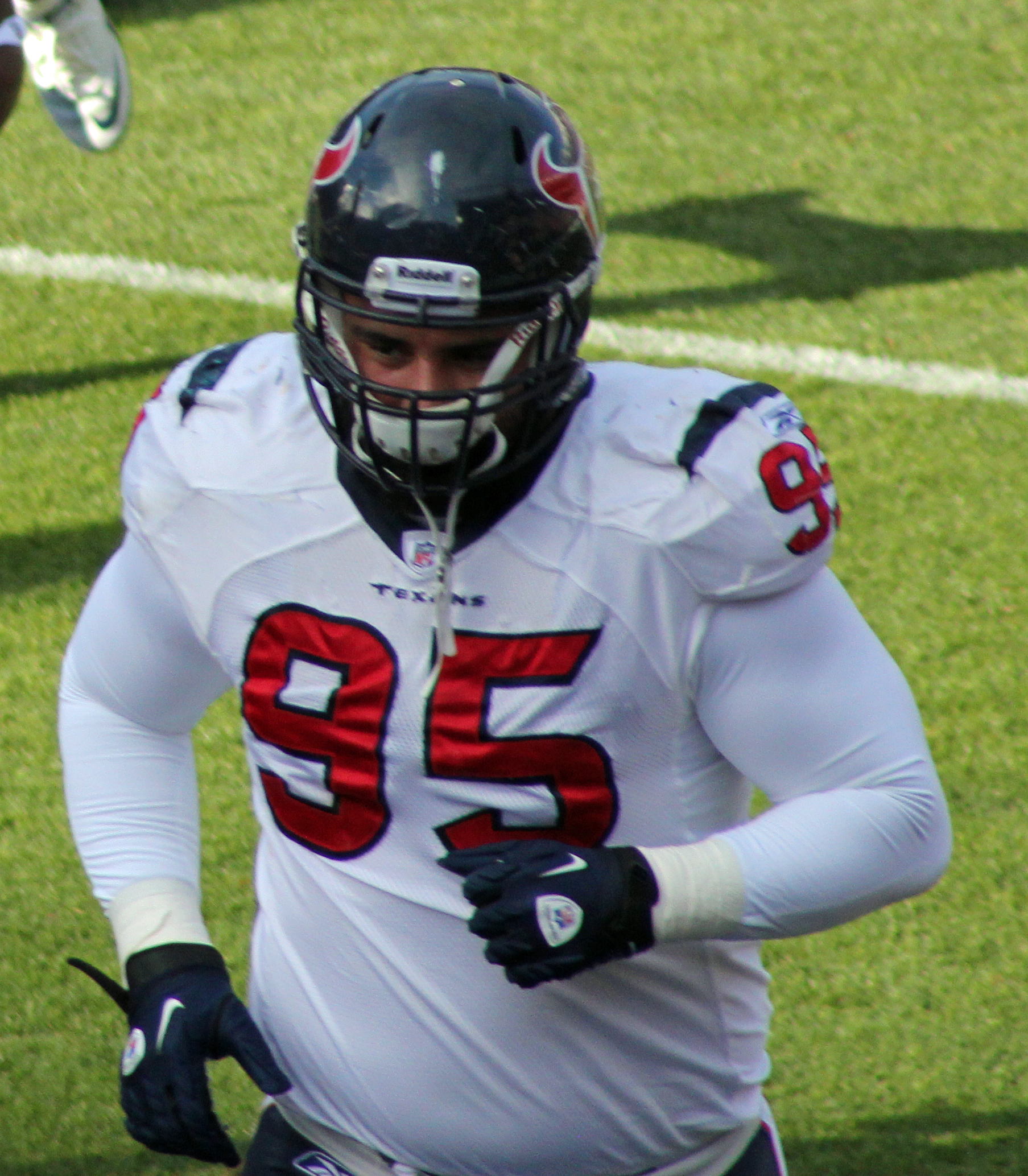
- Cody with the Houston Texans in 2010

No. 75, 95
- Position: Nose tackle

Personal information
- Born: January 22, 1983 (age 43); Whittier, California, U.S.
- Listed height: 6 ft 4 in (1.93 m)
- Listed weight: 307 lb (139 kg)

Career information
- High school: Los Altos (Hacienda Heights, California)
- College: USC (2001–2004)
- NFL draft: 2005: 2nd round, 37th overall pick

Career history
- Detroit Lions (2005−2008); Houston Texans (2009−2012)

Awards and highlights
- Consensus All-American (2004); Third-team All-American (2003); Pac-10 Co-Defensive Player of the Year (2004); 2× First-team All-Pac-10 (2003, 2004)

Career NFL statistics
- Total tackles: 191
- Sacks: 3
- Forced fumbles: 1
- Fumble recoveries: 2
- Interceptions: 1
- Stats at Pro Football Reference

Shaun Michael Cody (born January 22, 1983) is an American former professional football player who was a nose tackle in the National Football League (NFL). He played college football for the USC Trojans, earning consensus All-American honors. The Detroit Lions chose him in the second round of the 2005 NFL draft. He is currently a commentator for the USC football team.

== Early life ==
Cody was born in Whittier, California. After spending his freshman year at Damien High School in La Verne, he attended Los Altos High School in Hacienda Heights, and he played for the Los Altos Conquerors high school football team. Lining up as defensive end, Cody recorded 105 tackles and 22 sacks as a senior, while helping Los Altos to a 14–0 record and its second consecutive CIF Division VII championship. As a junior, he had 150 tackles, 51 tackles for losses, 35 sacks, 10 deflections and 10 forced fumbles. Cody was recognized by USA Today as its 2000 All-USA Defensive Most Valuable Player. He also played in the first-ever U.S. Army All-American Bowl game on December 30, 2000.

One of the most-sought after recruits of his class, Cody was particularly heavily recruited by the USC Trojans and their newly hired coaches Pete Carroll and Ed Orgeron. Cody was Carroll's first blue-chip recruit, which attracted other talented players and eventually led to USC's dominance in the early 2000s.

== College career ==
Cody attended the University of Southern California, and played for coach Pete Carroll's USC Trojans football team from 2001 to 2004. He was a backup defensive lineman for USC's first four games of 2001, and started the last eight at tackle, and posted 39 tackles, including seven for losses (with five sacks), and one fumble recovery. He was a first-team Freshman All-America selection. As a sophomore in 2002, Cody started for his second season at defensive while starting the first six games, and compiled 20 tackles, including one for a loss, a deflection, fumble recovery, and a blocked field goal.

Cody started all thirteen games as a junior defensive tackle in 2003, and had 26 tackles, including 10.5 for losses (with six sacks), plus a forced fumble, a deflection and three blocked field goals. He was a first-team All-Pac-10 selection and received third-team All-American honors from the Associated Press. He was recognized as a first-team All-Pac-10 selection and consensus first-team All-American as a senior in 2004, after he compiled a career-high 45 tackles (29 solo), 10 sacks, 13 stops for losses, two forced fumbles, two fumble recoveries and three pass deflections. He was also a team captain and voted Pac-10 Defensive Player of the Year.

== Professional career ==
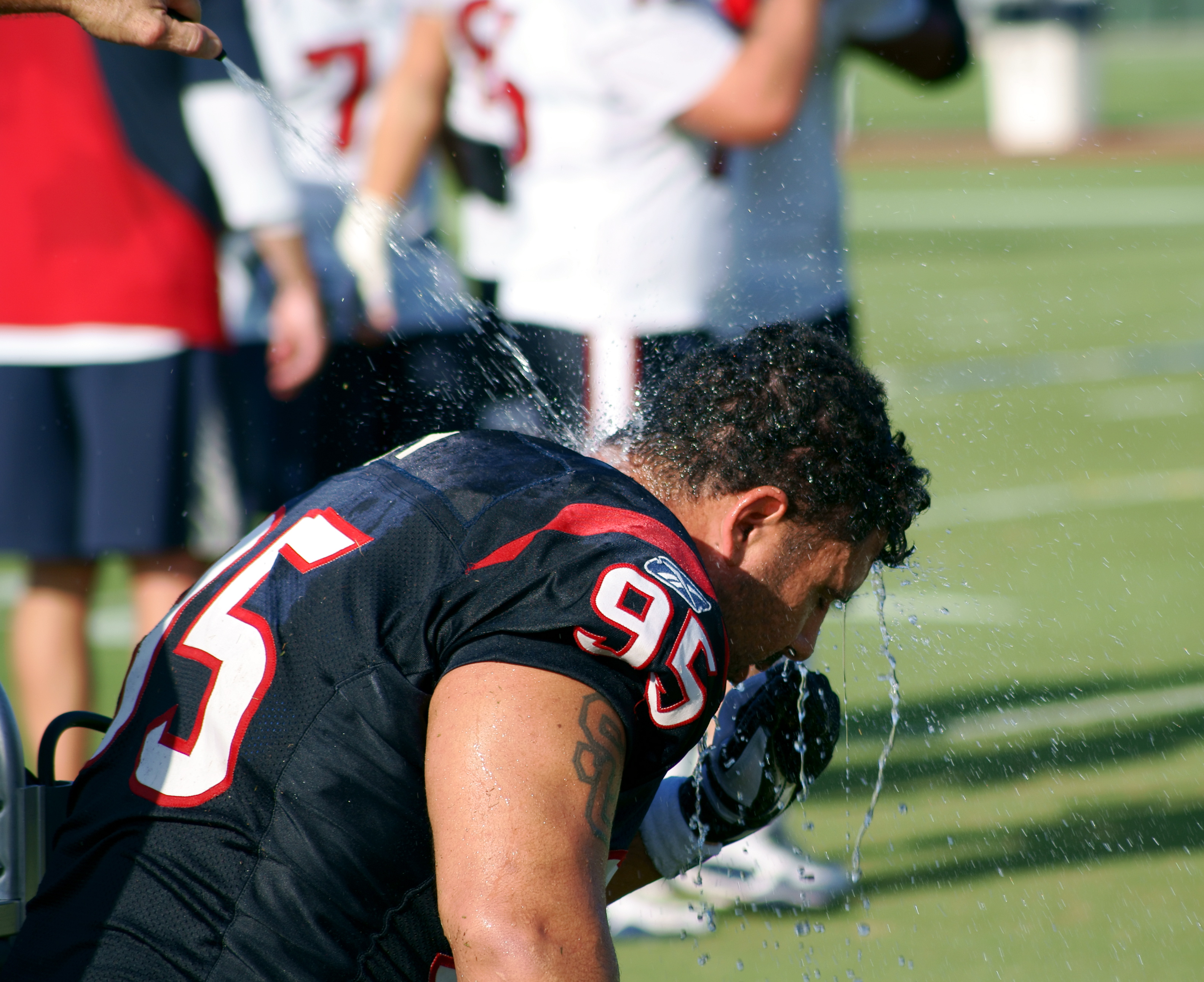
Cody at Texans training camp

=== 2005 NFL draft ===
Projected as a late first-round selection by Sports Illustrated, Cody was ranked as the No. 2 defensive tackle available in the 2005 NFL draft, behind only Travis Johnson. He eventually was the fourth lineman off the boards, after Johnson, Luis Castillo, and his USC teammate Mike Patterson.

=== Detroit Lions ===
Cody was selected with the 37th overall pick in the second round of the 2005 NFL draft out of the University of Southern California. He played four seasons for the Lions, recording 91 tackles, 1.5 sacks, one forced fumble and one interceptions in 53 games, before becoming a free agent following the 2008 season.

=== Houston Texans ===
An unrestricted free agent in the 2009 offseason, Cody agreed to terms on a three-year contract with the Houston Texans on March 23, 2009. In Week 9 against the Buffalo Bills in 2012, Cody suffered a punctured lung and broken ribs, but later returned to finish the game.

== NFL career statistics ==
Legend
**Bold**	Career high

=== Regular season ===
Year	Team	Games		Tackles					Interceptions					Fumbles			
Year	Team	GP	GS	Cmb	Solo	Ast	Sck	TFL	Int	Yds	TD	Lng	PD	FF	FR	Yds	TD
2005	DET	**16**	2	28	17	11	**1.5**	4	0	0	0	0	0	**1**	**1**	0	0
2006	DET	6	5	11	7	4	0.0	1	0	0	0	0	0	0	0	0	0
2007	DET	15	0	16	13	3	0.0	3	**1**	-2	0	-2	1	0	0	0	0
2008	DET	**16**	4	37	**26**	11	0.0	**5**	0	0	0	0	**3**	0	0	0	0
2009	HOU	14	13	21	12	9	0.5	1	0	0	0	0	1	0	0	0	0
2010	HOU	**16**	**16**	**38**	21	**17**	0.0	3	0	0	0	0	0	0	0	0	0
2011	HOU	**16**	**16**	23	16	7	1.0	2	0	0	0	0	2	0	**1**	0	0
2012	HOU	13	12	17	10	7	0.0	0	0	0	0	0	2	0	0	0	0
		112	68	191	122	69	3.0	19	1	-2	0	0	9	1	2	0	0

=== Playoffs ===
Year	Team	Games		Tackles					Interceptions					Fumbles			
Year	Team	GP	GS	Cmb	Solo	Ast	Sck	TFL	Int	Yds	TD	Lng	PD	FF	FR	Yds	TD
2011	HOU	**2**	**1**	**7**	**2**	**5**	0.0	0	0	0	0	0	0	0	0	0	0
2012	HOU	**2**	**1**	0	0	0	0.0	0	0	0	0	0	0	0	0	0	0
		4	2	7	2	5	0.0	0	0	0	0	0	0	0	0	0	0

== Personal life ==
Cody participated in a series for Spike TV entitled Super Agent, in which a number of sports agents competed to work for him and negotiate his NFL contract.

Cody is the host of "On The Nose ", a behind-the-scenes internet video show with a humorous, irreverent style, interviewing several Texans including Connor Barwin and Bob McNair.
