= Justin Jacobs =

American statistician (born c. 1981)

Justin W. Jacobs
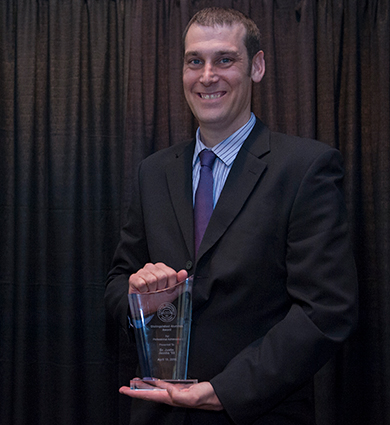
- Jacobs at Celebrate Carroll (Carroll University, 2016)
- Born: 1980 or 1981 (age 45–46); Cleveland, Ohio
- Education: University of Maryland, Baltimore County; University of Wisconsin–Milwaukee; Carroll University
- Awards: National Intelligence Medallion, PECASE
- Scientific career
- Fields: Statistics
- Thesis: Nonparametric Density Estimation on Riemannian Manifolds (2014)
- Doctoral advisors: John Zweck, Anindya Roy
- Website: www.squared2020.com

Justin Wayne Jacobs (born c. 1981) is an American statistician, currently serving as the Spatial Statistics Group Lead at Oak Ridge National Laboratory. Jacobs is a former applied research mathematician at the National Security Agency, a Senior Basketball Researcher with the Orlando Magic, a Spatiotemporal Analytics Researcher with the Houston Rockets, and an independent sports analytics researcher. Noted for his research into geolocation, geospatial statistics and spatio-temporal statistics, Jacobs was awarded a National Intelligence Medallion from the ODNI in January 2014 by the Director of National Intelligence as well as the Presidential Early Career Award for Science and Engineering (PECASE) in April 2014 by President Barack Obama.

== Life ==
Jacobs earned his Bachelor of Science (B.S.) degrees in mathematics and software engineering at Carroll University in Waukesha, Wisconsin in 2003; his Master of Science (M.S.) degree in mathematics at University of Wisconsin–Milwaukee in 2005, and his Ph.D. in statistics at University of Maryland Baltimore County in 2014. Jacobs is also a former NCAA basketball player.

Jacobs' M.S. research involved development of asymptotic confidence interval estimation for exponential distribution and Pareto distribution, with applications into insurance coverage for wind damage data. Jacobs' Ph.D. dissertation is in the field of statistics and differential geometry, titled "Nonparametric Bayesian Density Estimation on Riemannian Manifolds" and has applications in the fields of geolocation and geostatistics. Jacobs has also served in an advisory and support role for scientists who have been trying to recover the ill-fated MH370 Malaysian airlines crash in the South Indian Ocean.

== Career and achievements ==
Jacobs formerly served as an applied research mathematician in the National Security Agency with a main focus on geolocation and spatio-temporal analysis on the WGS 84 manifold. Much of Jacobs' work has involved nonparametric statistics and analysis of electromagnetic wavefront propagation analysis for RF geolocation in the presence of degraded Geospatial Navigation Satellite System (GNSS) signals. This includes signature building using other RF methods, which has resulted in a patent, an ODNI medallion award, and the PECASE award.

== Sports analytics ==
Jacobs also independently develops prediction models on data obtained from the National Collegiate Athletic Association NCAA and the National Basketball Association NBA. These methods range from score predictions of NCAA and NBA games based on several factors such as recent player performance, past positional match-ups and referee assignments to ranking algorithms based on win-loss models, player injuries, locations, and times of day. In his 2015 recent rankings algorithm, Jacobs' predicted 65 of 68 NCAA Division One Men's Basketball Teams that would make the field of 68 for the annual March Madness National Championship tournament. In contrast, Joe Lunardi of ESPN predicted 65 correct. In 2016, Jacobs' model correctly selected 65 of the 68 NCAA teams selected to the NCAA Tournament, again tying Lunardi. In 2017, Jacobs' model correctly selected all 68 of the 68 NCAA teams selected to the NCAA Tournament, this time beating the ESPN results that had 67 selected.

Jacobs maintains a website called Squared2020: Squared Statistics. Jacobs uses the site to break down basketball analytics and provide insight into advanced modeling techniques for spatial temporal data. In December 2017, Jacobs announced his signing to the Orlando Magic as a Senior Basketball Researcher.

Starting in 2022, Jacobs started the cataloguing of a stint database for NBA games prior to the 1996-1997 NBA season—the first season of play-by-play data. By December 25, 2025, Jacobs had accounted for 2,068 games from the 1984-1985 season through the 1995-1996 season—a total of 413,259 possessions logged. From this database, Jacobs produces Regularized Adjusted Plus-Minus (RAPM) tables that highlight the top players of that era.

Jacobs' work led him to guest appearances on shows such as the Basketball Illuminati discussing detailed historical player analyses such as the over-inflation of steal totals for then-Defensive Player of the Year Award Winner Michael Jordan.
