= Matt Grootegoed =

American gridiron football player (born 1982)

No. 48
- Position: Linebacker

Personal information
- Born: May 6, 1982 (age 44); Huntington Beach, California, U.S.
- Listed height: 5 ft 10 in (1.78 m)
- Listed weight: 212 lb (96 kg)

Career information
- High school: Mater Dei (Santa Ana, California)
- College: Southern California
- NFL draft: 2005: undrafted

Career history
- Tampa Bay Buccaneers (2005)*; Detroit Lions (2005); Calgary Stampeders (2007–2009)
- * Offseason or practice squad member only

Awards and highlights
- Grey Cup champion (2008); AP national championship (2003, 2004); Consensus All-American (2004); 2× First-team All-Pac-10 (2002, 2004)

Career NFL statistics
- Total tackles: 4
- Stats at Pro Football Reference

Career CFL statistics
- Total tackles: 41
- Forced fumbles: 2
- Stats at CFL.ca (archived)

Matthew Arthur Grootegoed (born May 6, 1982) is an American former professional football player who was a linebacker in the National Football League (NFL) and Canadian Football League (CFL). He played college football for the USC Trojans, earning consensus All-American in 2004. He was signed by the NFL's Detroit Lions as an undrafted free agent in 2005, and also played for the CFL's Calgary Stampeders in 2009.

== Early life ==
Grootegoed was born in Huntington Beach, California. He attended Mater Dei High School in Santa Ana, California. The Mater Dei Monarchs high school football team won three California Interscholastic Federation (CIF) championships while he was a member.

As a junior in 1998, he rushed for more than 1,600 yards with twenty-one touchdowns on offense, and made 130 tackles, six forced fumbles and three interceptions on defense. In the CIF Division I championship game, which Mater Dei won, he earned Offensive and Defensive Player of the Game honors (he ran for 244 yards, with a 7.4 average, and two touchdowns). Following the season, he was selected as a Student Sports Junior All-American, Cal-Hi All-State first-team, All-CIF Southern Section first-team, All-CIF Division I Defensive Most Valuable Player (MVP), Los Angeles Times All-Orange County Back of the Year and Orange County Register All-Orange County Defensive MVP.

During his 1999 senior season, he made 138 tackles, six interceptions (including two touchdown returns), seven tackles for losses and two forced fumbles as a free safety, and ran for 945 yards on 116 carries with fourteen touchdowns as a running back. He also played quarterback early in the season, completing 21 of 41 passes for 300-plus yards. Afterward, he was selected for the USA Today All-USA first-team, Parade All-American, Super Prep All-American, Prep Star All-American, ESPN All-American, Cal-Hi Sports All-State first-team, All-CIF Southern Section first-team, and received the All-CIF Division I Defensive MVP Award, Los Angeles Times Glenn Davis Award, Los Angeles Times All-Orange County first-team, Orange County Register All-Orange County Defensive MVP and All-Serra League MVP.

== College career ==
Grootegoed received an athletic scholarship to attend the University of Southern California, where he was a four-year starter for coach Pete Carroll's USC Trojans football team from 2000 to 2004. After redshirting as a true freshman in 2000, he earned a spot in the Trojans' starting line-up. Carroll said of him "Things just happen when he's on the field. He knocks the ball down, knocks the ball loose, forces plays in the backfield and makes plays getting off blocks. You can't hold him down." While Grootegoed played for the Trojans, the team won three straight Pacific-10 Conference championships (2002, 2003, 2004) and two consecutive Associated Press (AP) national championships in 2003 and 2004. He was a second-team All-Pac-10 selection in 2003. Following his senior season in 2004, he was a finalist for the Butkus Award, and was recognized as a first-team All-Pac-10 selection and a consensus first-team All-American.

== Professional career ==
On April 26, 2005, Grootegoed was signed as an undrafted free agent by the Tampa Bay Buccaneers following the 2005 NFL draft, eventually released to their practice squad, and was later picked up by the Detroit Lions. Grootegoed played for the Lions in the final three games of their 2005 season.

Grootegoed played for the CFL's Calgary Stampeders from 2007 to 2009, and was a member of the Stampeders' 2008 Grey Cup championship team. The Stampeders released Grootegoed on September 9, 2009.
