= Chris McFoy =

American football player (born 1983)

No. 14
- Position: Wide receiver

Personal information
- Born: August 14, 1983 (age 43); Chino, California, U.S.
- Listed height: 6 ft 2 in (1.88 m)
- Listed weight: 200 lb (91 kg)

Career information
- College: USC

Career history
- Oakland Raiders (2007)

Career NFL statistics
- Receptions: 1
- Receiving yards: 19
- Stats at Pro Football Reference

Chris McFoy (born August 14, 1983) is an American former professional football player who was a wide receiver for the Oakland Raiders of the National Football League (NFL).

== Early life ==
McFoy attended Chino High School in Chino, California and was ranked by rivals.com as the 3rd best high school wide receiver in America in 2002.

== College career ==
McFoy was one of the two senior wide receivers at the University of Southern California and ranked third on the team in receiving yards per game behind All-Americans Steve Smith and Dwayne Jarrett. He started over 15 games during his career. He played in the 2007 Hula Bowl.

== Professional career ==
McFoy was signed as a free agent by the National Football League's Oakland Raiders in April 2007. He was released on September 1, but was signed a day later after being named to the practice squad. On December 16, 2007, he was signed to the active roster.

He played the last three games in the 2007 season. He saw time as a receiver against the Indianapolis Colts on December 16, Jacksonville Jaguars on 12/23 (where he had one reception for 19 yards) and against the San Diego Chargers on 12/30.

McFoy was an exclusive rights free agent in 2008, but the Raiders re-signed him on March 21, 2008.

== Personal life ==
One of McFoy's brothers, Ryan McFoy, was the starting safety at Arizona State University.
