= 2006 Rose Bowl =

American college football bowl game

2006 Rose Bowl presented by Citi
- BCS National Championship Game; 92nd Rose Bowl Game "Game of the Century"
Texas Longhorns	USC Trojans
(12–0)	(12–0 (Note: After an investigation into the eligibility of Reggie Bush, USC later vacated all results during the season for an official 0–0 record.))
Big 12	Pac-10
41	38
Head coach: Mack Brown	Head coach: Pete Carroll
AP / Coaches / BCS; 2 / 2 / 2	AP / Coaches / BCS; 1 / 1 / 1
	1	2	3	4	Total
Texas	0	16	7	18	41
USC	7	3	14	14	38
- Date: January 4, 2006
- Season: 2005
- Stadium: Rose Bowl
- Location: Pasadena, California
- MVP: Offensive: Vince Young (QB, Texas); Defensive: Michael Huff (S, Texas)
- Favorite: USC by 7
- National anthem: LeAnn Rimes
- Referee: David Witvoet (Big Ten)
- Halftime show: Spirit of Troy; University of Texas Longhorn Band
- Attendance: 93,988
- Payout: US$14.998 million

United States TV coverage
- Network: ABC
- Announcers: Keith Jackson (play-by-play); Dan Fouts (analyst); Todd Harris and Holly Rowe (sideline)
- Nielsen ratings: 21.7 (35.6 million viewers)

The 2006 Rose Bowl Game, played on January 4, 2006, at the Rose Bowl in Pasadena, California, was an American college football bowl game that served as the BCS National Championship Game for the 2005 NCAA Division I-A football season. It featured the only two unbeaten teams of the season: the defending Rose Bowl champion and reigning Big 12 Conference champion Texas Longhorns played Pacific-10 Conference titleholders and two-time defending AP national champions, the USC Trojans. Texas would defeat USC (whose loss was later officially vacated) 41–38 to capture its fourth football championship in program history and first consensus national title since 1969.

The game was a back-and-forth contest; Texas's victory was not secured until the game's final nineteen seconds. Vince Young, the Texas quarterback, and Michael Huff, a Texas safety, were named the offensive and defensive Rose Bowl Players of the Game. ESPN named Young's fourth-down, game-winning touchdown run the fifth-highest rated play in college football history. The game is the highest-rated BCS game in television history with 21.7% of households watching it, and is often considered the greatest Rose Bowl game of all time, as well as the greatest college football game ever played.

Texas's Rose Bowl win was the 800th victory in school history and the Longhorns ended the season ranked third in Division I history in both wins and winning percentage (.7143). It was only the third time that the two top-ranked teams had faced each other in Rose Bowl history, with the 1963 Rose Bowl and 1969 Rose Bowl games being the others; these games also featured USC.

This was the final game ever called by longtime broadcaster Keith Jackson (as well as the final Rose Bowl to telecast under ABC Sports branding); the 2007 Rose Bowl would be an ESPN on ABC presentation. It was also the final time until the BCS National Championship Game for the 2009 Season that it was broadcast as an ESPN on ABC presentation. In addition, this was the last National Championship Game in the BCS era to be a nominal BCS bowl game (the National Championship and the four BCS bowls became separate events beginning with the 2006 season) as well as the last National Championship Game without a participant from the Southeastern Conference (SEC) in consecutive years until the 2024 season.

This was the first college football game to feature two Heisman Trophy winners in the same starting lineup. USC's quarterback Matt Leinart and running back Reggie Bush won the award in 2004 and 2005.

In 2010, USC was forced to vacate every game from the 2005 season due to violations involving the eligibility of Reggie Bush. While the NCAA normally only vacates victories, USC claims its Rose Bowl loss was later vacated from official NCAA records, along with its 12 wins from before the game, leaving an official 2005 regular season record of 0–0.

== Pre-game buildup ==
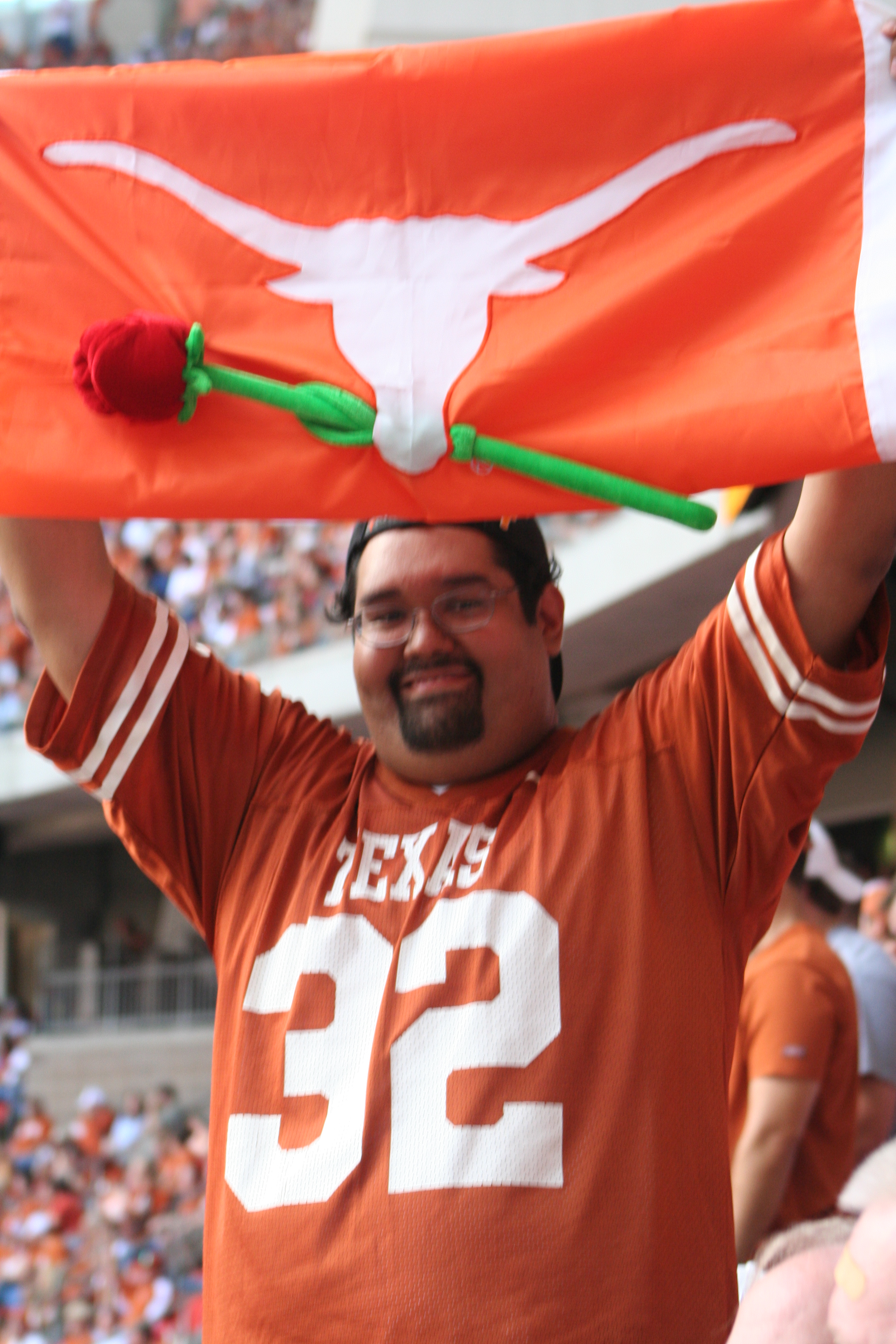
A Texas fan looks ahead to the Rose Bowl during Texas' 70–3 win over Colorado in the Big 12 Championship Game.

USC entered the game on a 34-game winning streak. It was the longest active streak in Division I-A. (Many of those wins have since been vacated following NCAA sanctions surrounding allegedly illegal benefits given to USC's Reggie Bush.) Texas brought the second-longest active streak, having won nineteen straight games and entered as the defending Rose Bowl champion, after defeating Michigan in the 2005 Rose Bowl. The teams' combined 53-game win streak was an NCAA record for teams playing each other. The game was also the first to pit against each other the teams ranked first and second in every iteration of the BCS standings. This was Texas's second trip to the Rose Bowl in two years (and second trip in the history of UT football).

A few weeks before the game, USC's Reggie Bush won the Heisman Trophy ahead of second-place finisher Vince Young. Bush had the second-highest number of first place votes in Heisman history (behind O. J. Simpson) and the highest percentage of first-place votes, while Young had a record number of second-place votes. Bush's 933-point margin of victory was the 17th highest in Heisman voting history. The other finalist was USC's Matt Leinart, who had won the Heisman trophy in 2004. This meant that the Rose Bowl would mark the first time that two Heisman-trophy winners had ever played in the same backfield.

The 2006 Rose Bowl was, in the eyes of many, the most-anticipated matchup in college football history. Both teams were considered good enough to win the National Championship had they existed in different years instead of having to play each other. USC had been ranked No. 1 since the preseason and Texas had held the No. 2 spot that entire time. Before the game, some commentators postulated that the 2005 USC team was one of the greatest college football teams of all time. ESPN analysts were virtually unanimous in declaring the 2005 USC Trojans as having the best offense in college football history (though it did not lead the nation in points scored; Texas did). Mark May and Kirk Herbstreit declared that the 2005 USC Trojans were the second-best college football team of the past 50 years (May placed them behind only the 1995 Nebraska Cornhuskers; Herbstreit behind only the 2001 Miami Hurricanes). This led Texas fans to mockingly chant "Best...Team...Ever" during the post-game celebration. Stewart Mandel of Sports Illustrated later observed, "ESPN spent the better part of Christmas season comparing that Trojans squad to some of the most acclaimed teams of all time only to find out that they weren’t even the best team that season." Lee Corso was one of the few ESPN analysts to predict a Texas win.

== Game summary ==
=== First quarter ===
USC received the opening kickoff and managed just three yards against a Texas defense that was stout early in the game. Aaron Ross fumbled the ball on the ensuing punt return, committing the first of four Texas fumbles on the day (though it would only lose one), and the Trojans recovered. A 23-yard Leinart pass to senior fullback David Kirtman, who was hit hard by Cedric Griffin and forced to leave the game briefly (Kirtman finished the game with three catches for 61 yards on the day), set up a four-yard touchdown run by running back LenDale White, a bruiser who out-rushed his speedy counterpart, Bush, on the day, gaining 124 yards on 20 carries. Kicker Mario Danelo's extra point gave USC a seven-point lead. The teams twice exchanged possessions to end the first quarter, as each defense held the opposing offense in check.

=== Second quarter ===
On the second play of the second quarter, Reggie Bush exploded for 35 yards off a Leinart pass, reaching Texas's 18-yard line before attempting to lateral pass the ball to an uncovered teammate; Texas strong safety Michael Huff recovered the loose ball. The Pac-10 football-officiating coordinator later stated that Bush's pass was incorrectly officiated because it was an illegal forward pass, not a lateral, so the Trojans should have retained possession. Young drove his team 53 yards on the ensuing possession, twice hitting senior tight end David Thomas, who finished the day as Young's leading receiver, catching ten passes for 88 yards. The Trojans' defense tackled sophomore running back Ramonce Taylor five yards behind the line of scrimmage and forced a fumble that Young recovered for an additional five-yard loss. This forced a Texas field-goal attempt, which David Pino converted from 46 yards to cut Texas's deficit to four.

On USC's next possession, Leinart drove his team into Texas territory, this time to the 25-yard line, before throwing an interception to Texas free safety Michael Griffin, who appeared to be out of the play but ran halfway across the field before making a leaping catch and barely staying in-bounds in the end zone. The turnover ended a second Trojans' drive with USC in scoring position. On the following Texas drive, Young connected with wide receiver Limas Sweed, who caught eight balls for 65 yards on the day, for a key first down. Young then led his team with his legs, capping the drive by running 10 yards before throwing a lateral pass to open running back Selvin Young, who ran for 12 more for the touchdown. The lateral, made after Young's knee had touched the ground, was not reviewed because of issues with the replay equipment. The game continued with a failed extra-point attempt by Texas, which, not knowing of the equipment issues, appeared to rush the kick to get the play off before the prior play could be reviewed. The NCAA football-officiating coordinator later asserted that Young's knee had been down, and expressed confusion about how the call had been handled.

A defensive stop on USC's next possession and a 15-yard punt return gave Texas the ball near midfield, and the Longhorns capitalized when Young found Thomas for 14 yards on one play, and Taylor running 30 yards for a touchdown on another. Pino's extra point extended the Longhorns' lead to 16–7. On the next drive, Leinart threw a pass intended for Reggie Bush that was grabbed by Texas linebacker/safety Drew Kelson. But Kelson landed on his back after catching the pass and the ball popped out. The pass was ruled incomplete; equipment issues again prevented a review. USC's drive continued with a Leinart pass to wide receiver Dwayne Jarrett, the top Trojan receiver of the day with ten catches totaling 121 yards, a quarterback keeper of 14 yards, and a Bush 12-yard run took the Trojans to the Texas 13-yard line with 40 seconds to play in the half. But two sacks by defensive tackle Frank Okam pushed USC back 13 yards and forced the Trojans to use two timeouts. Consequently, Danelo's 43-yard field goal allowed USC three points, and the half ended with Texas still ahead, 16–10.

=== Third quarter ===
The Trojan defense came back strong from the halftime break and forced a punt on the Longhorns' opening drive of the third quarter. During the following USC drive, Leinart hit Jarrett for three passes totaling 35 yards, and White added the final 17 yards over two carries, capping the seven-play, 62-yard drive with a three-yard touchdown run. It was his second of the game, and it put the Trojans ahead, 17–16.

Behind the running of Jamaal Charles, who finished the game with five carries for 34 yards, and Young, who ran 19 times for 200 yards, Texas quickly answered. Young scored the first of his three rushing touchdowns from 14 yards out, and Pino's successful extra-point attempt moved the Longhorns ahead, 23–17.

The lead changed hands once more with 4:07 to play in the third quarter, as Leinart hit tight end Dominique Byrd for two of his four catches and 21 of his 32 yards in the next drive and set up the next score. Although USC had been stopped on a fourth-and-short attempt earlier in the game, it decided to gamble again on fourth-and-one from the 12, and this time White muscled it all the way to the end zone to record his third rushing touchdown of the game and the 57th of his career. The achievement set a USC record.

The Longhorns reached Trojan territory on the ensuing drive, with Young's 45-yard run constituting most of the work, but ultimately the Trojans forced a field-goal attempt from USC's 14-yard line, and, on the first play of the fourth quarter, Pino missed a 31-yard kick that would have put his team ahead by two.

=== Fourth quarter ===
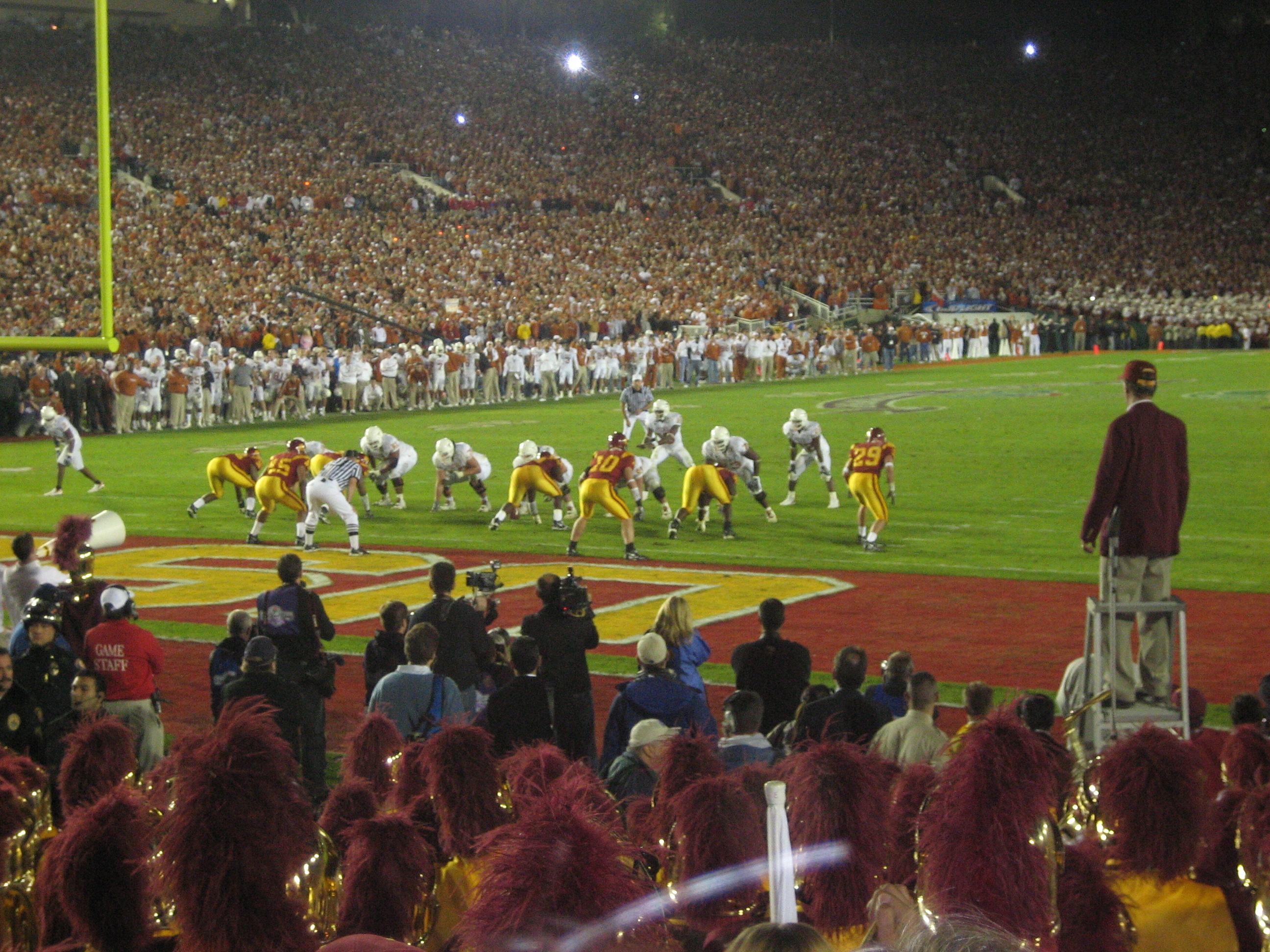
Vince Young about to score the go-ahead touchdown.

Behind Leinart's precise throwing (despite one interception, Leinart finished the day with otherwise stellar numbers, completing 29-of-40 passes for 365 yards and one touchdown), the Trojans drove 80 yards over nine plays in 3:36. Bush scored his only touchdown of the game on a 26-yard run to end the drive. (Bush finished the game with 95 yards on just six catches and gained 82 yards on 13 carries; he also averaged 20.2 yards on five punt returns.)

The Longhorns’ next possession began with an apparent reception and fumble by Jamaal Charles. The error would have given USC the ball on the Texas 40, but replay officials ruled the catch incomplete. Two Vince Young completions to wide receiver Billy Pittman, who caught four passes for 53 yards on the day, helped the Longhorns drive to USC's 17-yard line on the next possession. When Young fumbled on third down, Texas settled for a 34-yard field goal that brought the Longhorns to within five, 31–26.

On the ensuing possession, the Trojans gained 48 yards with a 33-yard Leinart pass to Kirtman and a 15-yard roughing-the-passer penalty. This set up a 22-yard toss from Leinart to Jarrett – a play that saw Texas cornerback Tarrel Brown get injured while trying to tackle Jarrett at the goal line. Brown and a teammate collided as Jarrett stretched the ball over the goal line, and the successful extra-point attempt gave USC its biggest lead of the game, 38–26.

As Texas took the ball trailing by two scores with just 6:42 to play, Young accounted for all 69 yards of a Longhorns scoring drive that took just 2:39 to complete, rushing for 25 (including a 17-yard touchdown run) and completing five passes for the rest of the necessary yardage. (For the game, Young completed 75 percent of his passes – 30-of-40 – for 267 yards, with no passing touchdowns and no interceptions.) Pino's extra point again brought Texas to within five with 3:58 to play.

Though the Longhorns' defense yielded one first down on the subsequent USC drive, it held the Trojans, who turned to LenDale White on a third down at midfield only to see him lose the ball and have it recovered by wide receiver Steve Smith just two yards short of a first down. A Texas timeout stopped the clock with 2:13 to play. Then, in what proved the most pivotal coaching decision of the game, Trojans coach Pete Carroll elected to give his #2-ranked offense (behind only Texas), which had averaged 582.2 yards and 50.0 points per game on the year, an opportunity to convert fourth down and two at the Texas 45-yard line. But the Texas defense, which had failed to stop this same play three times, held White to a one-yard gain. The result was a turnover on downs at the Longhorns' 44-yard line with 2:09 to play.

During its final drive, Texas faced third-and-12. Texas converted for a first down at USC's 46-yard line after a completed pass for seven yards and a Trojans face-mask penalty. From there, Young rushed once for seven yards between two passes for 26 yards to little-used wide receiver Brian Carter, moving the ball to the USC 14-yard line. Facing fourth-and-five from the nine-yard line, Young received the shotgun snap and found his receivers covered. Young bolted towards the right sideline and received a critical block from Justin Blalock and won a footrace to the end zone. That score, Young's third rushing touchdown of the game, gave the Longhorns a one-point lead with 19 seconds left to play. When Texas lined up for a two-point conversion, USC used its last time out. Young successfully reached the end zone on the ensuing play, giving his team a 41–38 lead. Leinart took the ball with only 16 seconds left and no timeouts. He drove the Trojans to the Texas 43-yard line when time expired. The loss was only the second of Leinart's college career, and the first Rose Bowl loss for USC since the 1989 game.

== Scoring summary ==
Rose Bowl – BCS National Championship Game: Texas Longhorns (12–0) vs. USC Trojans (12–0)

Quarter	1	2	3	4	Total
#2 Texas	0	16	7	18	41
#1 USC	7	3	14	14	38

at Rose Bowl • Pasadena, CA

- Date: Wednesday, January 4, 2006
- Game time: 5:26 PM PST
- Game weather: Hazy, 68 °F (20 °C)
- Game attendance: 96,986
- Referee: David Witvoet
- TV announcers (ABC): Keith Jackson, Dan Fouts, Todd Harris, Holly Rowe
- Box Score Recap

Game information

First Quarter

- (12:27) USC – LenDale White 4 yard run (Danelo kick), USC 7–0; 5 plays, 46 yards, 1:12

Second Quarter

- (10:38) UT – David Pino 46 yard field goal, USC 7–3; 9 plays, 52 yards, 4:02
- (4:57) UT – Selvin Young 12 yard run (Pino kick failed), UT 9–7; 7 plays, 80 yards, 1:53
- (2:34) UT – Ramonce Taylor 30 yard run (Pino kick), UT 16–7; 4 plays, 51 yards, 1:12
- (0:02) USC – Mario Danelo 43 yard field goal, UT 16–10; 11 plays, 54 yards, 2:32

Third Quarter

- (10:36) USC – LenDale White 2 yard run (Danelo kick), USC 17–16; 7 plays, 62 yards, 3:27
- (8:34) UT – Vince Young 14 yard run (Pino kick), UT 23–17; 7 plays, 80 yards, 2:02
- (4:07) USC – LenDale White 12 yard run (Danelo kick), USC 24–23; 9 plays, 74 yards, 4:27

Fourth Quarter

- (11:19) USC – Reggie Bush 26 yard run (Danelo kick), USC 31–23; 9 plays, 52 yards, 2:33
- (8:46) UT – David Pino 34 yard field goal, USC 31–26; 9 plays, 52 yards, 2:33
- (6:42) USC – Dwayne Jarrett 22 yard pass from Matt Leinart (Danelo kick), USC 38–26; 4 plays, 80 yards, 2:04
- (4:03) UT – Vince Young 17 yard run (Pino kick), USC 38–33; 8 plays, 69 yards, 2:39
- (0:19) UT – Vince Young 8 yard run (Young run), UT 41–38; 10 plays, 56 yards, 1:50

Statistics	TEX	USC
First downs	30	30
Total yards	556	574
Rushing: Att/Yds	36/289	41/209
Passing yards	267	365
Passing: Comp–Att–Int	30–40–0	29–41–1
Time of possession	28:00	32:00

Team	Category	Player	Statistics
Texas	Passing	Vince Young	30–40, 267 yards
Texas	Rushing	Vince Young	19 car, 200 yards, 3 TDs
Texas	Receiving	David Thomas	10 rec, 88 yards
USC	Passing	Matt Leinart	29–40, 365 yards, 1 TD, 1 INT
USC	Rushing	LenDale White	20 car, 124 yards, 3 TDs
USC	Receiving	Dwayne Jarrett	10 rec, 121 yards, 1 TD

== Analysis and aftermath ==
Vince Young was named the Rose Bowl's MVP for the second time in as many years (the first time being the 2005 Rose Bowl). He is only the fourth player in Rose Bowl history (and the only player from the Big 12 Conference) to accomplish this feat. USC head coach Pete Carroll regarded Young's performance as "the greatest he's ever seen by any one guy". Following the match, USC players Matt Leinart and Reggie Bush went to the Longhorns' locker room to personally congratulate the victors.

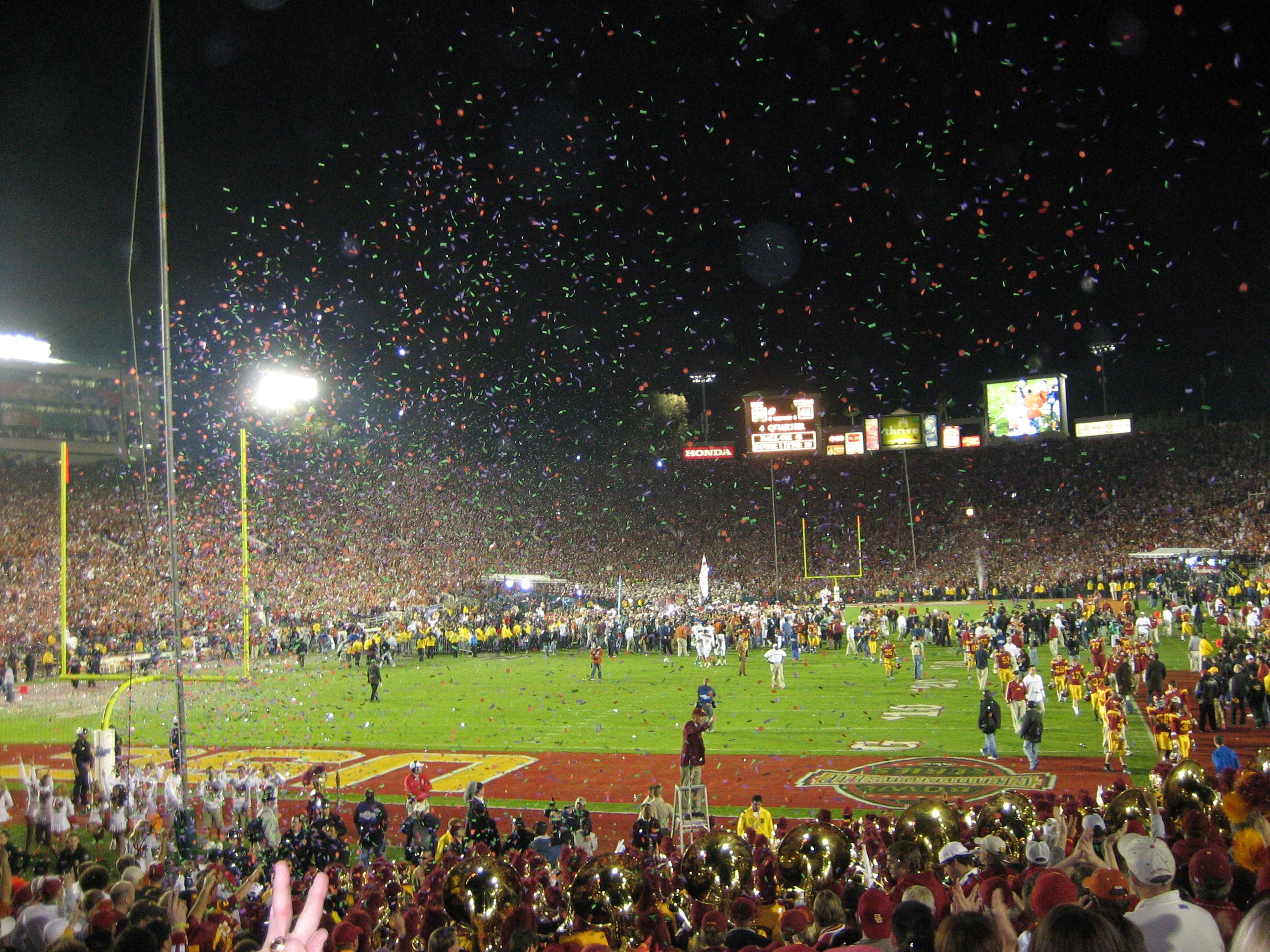
Confetti rains down on the field in the post-game celebration as Texas defeats USC.

Though USC converted on 57 percent of third downs (to only 27 percent for the Longhorns), it was unable to gain two yards on a 4th down try late in the 4th quarter when doing so might have ensured a Trojan victory. The Trojans did not have Heisman winner Bush on the field for the 4th down play; LenDale White received the handoff and was stuffed by the Longhorn defense. The Trojans also hurt themselves with two turnovers in Texas territory early in the game. Mack Brown, previously maligned for his inability to win big games, thus ended the fourth-longest winning streak in Division I-A history – and the longest since a 35-game streak by Toledo ended in 1971 – and, behind Young, who accounted for 839 yards of total offense in his two Rose Bowl appearances, won the first national title for Texas since 1970. Young accounted for 467 yards in the championship game, which stands as the best performance ever in a BCS Championship game. By winning, Texas assured itself a first-place ranking in the USA Today coaches' poll, and its achievement was confirmed when AP polling sportswriters unanimously voted Texas number one on January 5, 2006; USC finished a unanimous second in each poll. On January 11, 2006, Young was awarded the Manning Award, given annually to the nation's top quarterback. Unlike any other major college football award, the Manning is based partly on bowl results.

Four players from the game went on to become top-ten picks in the 2006 NFL draft: Reggie Bush (2nd overall, New Orleans), Vince Young (3rd overall, Tennessee), Michael Huff (7th overall, Oakland), and Matt Leinart (10th overall, Arizona). Taitusi Lutui, Fred Matua, LenDale White, David Kirtman, Winston Justice, Cedric Griffin, David Thomas, Frostee Rucker, Dominique Byrd, Darnell Bing, Jonathan Scott, LaJuan Ramsey, and Rodrique Wright were drafted in the next six rounds. This was longtime ABC Sports announcer Keith Jackson's last game, and was also the last college football game aired on ABC under the ABC Sports name, as ABC's sports division began going by the name of corporate sibling ESPN on ABC in September 2006.

The victory, Texas' 800th of all time, gave UT its fourth national championship in football. Since the game, the media, coaches, and other commentators have heaped praise upon the Texas team, Vince Young, and the Rose Bowl performance. For instance, Sports Illustrated called the game "perhaps the most stunning bowl performance ever". Both the Rose Bowl win as well as the Longhorns' overall season have both been cited as standing among the greatest performances in college football history by publications such as College Football News, the Atlanta Journal-Constitution, Scout.com, and Sports Illustrated. The Longhorns and the Trojans were together awarded the 2006 ESPY Award by ESPN for the "Best Game" in any sport. In December 2006, both Sports Illustrated and Time Magazine picked the game as the Best Sports Moment in 2006. Voters on Yahoo Sports also voted it as the Sports Story of the Year for both college football and overall, edging out 12 other stories in the overall voting and receiving 13,931 votes out of 65,641.

In the days that followed the Longhorns' victory, the Trinity River in Dallas mysteriously turned a "burnt orange" color. Authorities said that it may have been caused by someone dumping dye into the river.

The game received the highest Nielsen ratings for the Rose Bowl since the 1986 Rose Bowl between UCLA and Iowa. In 2007, ESPN compiled a list of the top 100 plays in college football history; Vince Young's game-winning touchdown in the 2006 Rose Bowl ranked number 5.

The 2006 Rose Bowl Game and its unreviewed, controversial officiants' rulings have been cited as a key reason the NCAA Football Rules Committee added a coach's challenge the following season. Ironically, USC opted to go without instant replay for its game against Notre Dame that season, and won on the final play when Reggie Bush illegally shoved Matt Leinart over the goal line.

Although the NCAA only vacated USC's victories, the school also claims to have had this defeat vacated. As a result, USC records show the Trojans as having a 0–0 record during the 2005 season.

This would be the last time USC and Texas met in a football game until 2017, which USC won in overtime 27–24. The two teams met again in 2018 in Texas as the second game of a home-and-home series between the two schools. Texas won 37–14 with USC failing to score any points after the first quarter and was the first time USC officially lost to Texas.

Assistant coaches Lane Kiffin and Steve Sarkisian would both end up as head coaches for USC after Pete Carroll left to join the NFL's Seattle Seahawks in 2010. Kiffin went 28–15 from 2010 before infamously being fired on the tarmac of LAX in the middle of the season in 2013, while Sarkisian went 12–6 in just two years from 2014-2015 before being fired due to numerous alcohol-related incidents. Alabama's Nick Saban would take a chance on both coaches and hire them as offensive assistants. The two would help the Crimson Tide reach a National Championship in 2016 in their lone season together.

== Game records ==
Team	Performance vs. Opponent	Year
First downs	30, Texas vs. USC; 30, USC vs. Texas	2006; 2006
Rushing yards	289, Texas vs. USC (36 att.)	2006
Passing yards	365, USC vs. Texas	2006
Total yards	574, USC vs. Texas (209 rush, 365 pass)	2006
Individual	Performance, Team vs. Opponent	Year
Total offense	467, Vince Young, Texas vs. USC (267 pass, 200 rush)	2006
Rushing yards	200, Vince Young (QB), Texas vs. USC (19 att.)	2006
Rushing TDs	3, Vince Young (QB), Texas vs. USC; 3, LenDale White, USC vs. Texas	2006; 2006
Passing yards	365, Matt Leinart, USC vs. Texas (29–40–1, 1 TD)	2006
Field goal	46, David Pino, Texas vs. USC	2006
