= List of most watched United States television broadcasts of 2006 =

The following is a list of most watched United States television broadcasts of 2006.

== Most watched by week ==
Broadcast (primetime only)
Week of	Title	Network	Viewers (in millions)	Ref.
January 2	Rose Bowl	ABC	35.63	
January 9	Broncos vs. Patriots (NFL)	CBS	26.25	
January 16	American Idol (Tues)	Fox	35.53	
January 23	American Idol (Tues)	Fox	34.96	
January 30	Super Bowl XL	ABC	90.75	
February 6	American Idol (Tues)	Fox	31.15	
February 13	American Idol (Wed)	Fox	28.78	
February 20	American Idol (Wed)	Fox	31.69	
February 27	American Idol (Tues)	Fox	30.09	
March 6	American Idol (Wed)	Fox	30.38	
March 13	American Idol (Tues)	Fox	32.77	
March 20	American Idol (Tues)	Fox	33.36	
March 27	American Idol (Tues)	Fox	31.71	
April 3	American Idol (Tues)	Fox	28.83	
April 10	American Idol (Tues)	Fox	29.65	
April 17	American Idol (Tues)	Fox	28.44	
April 24	American Idol (Tues)	Fox	28.67	
May 1	American Idol (Tues)	Fox	29.26	
May 8	American Idol (Tues)	Fox	28.85	
May 15	American Idol (Tues)	Fox	28.33	
May 22	American Idol (Wed)	Fox	36.38	
