= Rodrique Wright =

American gridiron football player and coach (born 1984)

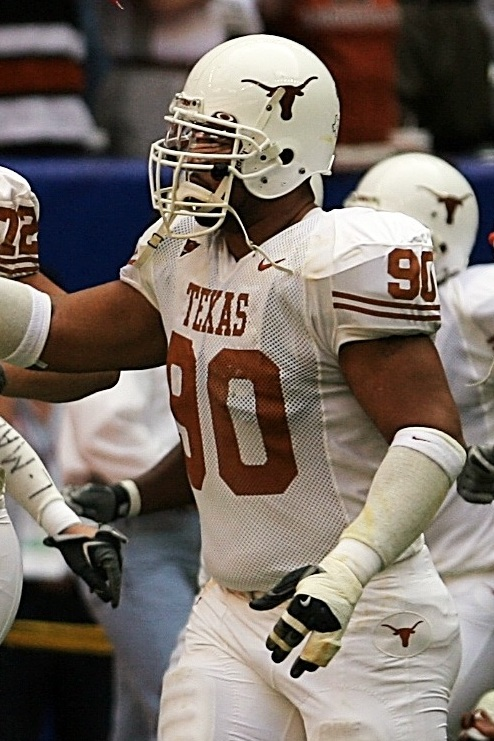
- Wright with the Texas Longhorns before the 2005 Big 12 Championship Game

Houston Texans
- Title: Defensive run game coordinator/defensive line coach

Personal information
- Born: July 31, 1984 (age 42); Houston, Texas, U.S.
- Listed height: 6 ft 5 in (1.96 m)
- Listed weight: 300 lb (136 kg)

Career information
- Position: Defensive tackle (No. 90)
- High school: Alief Hastings (Houston)
- College: Texas
- NFL draft: 2006: 7th round, 226th overall pick

Career history

Playing
- Miami Dolphins (2006–2008); New York Jets (2010)*; Saskatchewan Roughriders (2010–2011); Dallas Vigilantes (2011)
- * Offseason or practice squad member only

Coaching
- Texas (2010–2013) Student assistant & defensive special assistant; Sam Houston State (2014–2017) Defensive line coach; East Carolina (2018) Defensive line coach; UTSA (2019–2021); Defensive line coach (2019); Run game coordinator & defensive line coach (2020); Co-defensive coordinator & defensive line coach (2021); Miami (2022) Defensive ends coach; Houston Texans (2023–present); Assistant defensive line coach (2023); Defensive line coach (2024–2025); Defensive run game coordinator/defensive line coach (2026–present)

Awards and highlights
- BCS national champion (2005); Consensus All-American (2005); First-team All-Big 12 (2005); Second-team All-Big 12 (2004); Big 12 Defensive Freshman of the Year (2002)

Career NFL statistics
- Total tackles: 38
- Sacks: 1.5
- Fumble recoveries: 1
- Stats at Pro Football Reference
- Stats at CFL.ca (archive)

Rodrique Charles "Rod" Wright (born July 31, 1984) is an American professional football coach and former player who is the defensive run game coordinator and defensive line coach for the Houston Texans of the National Football League (NFL). He played for five seasons as a defensive end in the NFL and Canadian Football League (CFL). Wright played college football for the Texas Longhorns, earning consensus All-American honors in 2005 and a National Championship. The Miami Dolphins chose him in the seventh round of the 2006 NFL draft, and he also played for the CFL's Saskatchewan Roughriders.

== Early life ==
Wright was born in Houston, Texas. He was a three-year letterman and two-year starting defensive tackle for Alief Hastings High School in Houston. After seeing limited action as a sophomore, he was a first-team all-district selection as a junior after registering 92 tackles, nine quarterback sacks and a blocked extra point attempt.

Wright earned first-team high school All-America honors from USA Today as a senior. He was also a Parade magazine All-American and was rated among the nation's top 10 defensive line prospects by Student Sports. He was a first-team Class 5A all-state, All-Greater Houston and all-district selection as a senior. He was a finalist for the Greater Houston Touchdown Club Player of the Year award that season during which he posted 104 tackles, six sacks, three fumble recoveries and two blocked point-after attempts in 2001. Wright played in the 2002 U.S. Army All-American Bowl alongside fellow Texas Longhorns Kasey Studdard and Justin Blalock.

Considered a five-star recruit by Rivals.com, Wright was ranked second among defensive tackle prospects in the nation (behind Haloti Ngata).

=== Prep awards and honors ===
- First-team Parade All-American (2001)
- First-team USA Today All-American (2001)

== College career ==
Wright attended the University of Texas, where he played for coach Mack Brown's Texas Longhorns football team from 2002 to 2005. As a true freshman in 2002, he saw action in all 13 games and started nine. He was a first-team Freshman All-America selection by the Football Writers Association of America and The Sporting News. He earned Big 12 Defensive Freshman of the Year honors from the league's coaches, Fort Worth Star-Telegram, Houston Chronicle and The Sporting News. He shared the Longhorns' Outstanding Defensive Newcomer Award and ranked seventh on the team (first among true freshmen) in tackles (65), second in tackles for loss (13) and third in sacks (4.5) and quarterback pressures (15). He ranked in a third-place tie in tackles for loss and tied for fourth in sacks on Texas' freshman lists. Wright was a key member of a Longhorns defense that led the Big 12 and ranked eighth in the NCAA in pass defense (165.2 ypg), second in the conference and seventh in the nation in pass efficiency defense (96.1 rtg), eighth in the country in scoring defense (16.3 ppg) and 16th nationally in total defense (307.7 ypg). He performed particularly well in Big 12 action, posting 52 tackles (22 solo), 13 tackles for loss, 4.5 sacks, 10 pressures, one forced fumble and a blocked kick in eight league contests.

Wright started all 13 games at defensive tackle in 2003, earning consensus second-team All-Big 12 honors and sharing the Longhorns' Outstanding Defensive Lineman award. He recorded 80 tackles, a team-leading 7.5 sacks, 12 tackles for loss (tied for second on the team), a team-leading 30 pressures, three passes batted down and three forced fumbles. In four games against Top 25 teams, he registered a total of 31 tackles, three sacks, four tackles for loss and eight pressures. While only a sophomore, Wright was a key member of a defense which ranked ninth in the NCAA in pass defense (177.3 ypg), 25th in total defense (329.8 ypg) and 32nd in scoring defense (21.5 ppg).

Wright played in 11 games, making 10 starts, at defensive tackle as a junior in 2004. Despite battling an ankle injury for much of the season, he posted 36 tackles, a sack, three tackles for loss and seven quarterback pressures. He recorded 16 tackles, one tackle for loss and two pressures in five games versus Top 25 foes.

For his performance during the year, Wright was tabbed second-team All-American by The Sporting News and honorable mention All-American by Pro Football Weekly. He was also named first-team All-Big 12 by The Dallas Morning News and Fort Worth Star-Telegram. He earned second-team All-Big 12 honors from the Associated Press, the conference coaches, The Austin American-Statesman and the San Antonio Express-News. For the second straight year, he shared the team's Outstanding Defensive Lineman Award.

In 2005, Wright started all 13 games and posted 46 tackles, 14 tackles for loss, 4.5 sacks, 15 pressures, three passes defensed, one forced fumble and one fumble recovery. He was a finalist for the Lombardi Award and tabbed First-team All-America by the Walter Camp Football Foundation and the Associated Press. To end his career, he won the national championship in a Rose Bowl victory over Southern California.

=== Awards and honors ===
- Big 12 Freshman of the Year (2002)
- First-team Football Writers Association of America Freshman All-American (2002)
- First-team Sporting News Freshman All-American (2002)
- 2x Longhorns' Outstanding Defensive Lineman Award (2003, 2004)
- Second-team All-Big 12 (2003)
- Second-team AP All-Big 12 (2004)
- Second-team Sporting News All-American(2004)
- First-team All-Big 12 (2005)
- First-team AP All-American (2005)
- First-team Walter Camp Football Foundation All-American (2005)
- Lombardi Award finalist (2005)

== Professional career ==
Pre-draft measurables
Height	Weight	Arm length	Hand span	40-yard dash	10-yard split	20-yard split	20-yard shuttle	Three-cone drill	Vertical jump	Broad jump	Bench press
6 ft 5 1/8 in (1.96 m)	300 lb (136 kg)	33 1/2 in (0.85 m)	10 3/4 in (0.27 m)	5.13 s	1.70 s	2.92 s	4.51 s	7.84 s	32.0 in (0.81 m)	9 ft 2 in (2.79 m)	31 reps
All values from NFL Combine

=== Miami Dolphins ===
Despite being widely regarded as a very good pro prospect and one of the best defensive tackles in the nation at Texas, Wright fell all the way to the seventh round and was selected by the Miami Dolphins with the 226th overall pick in the 2006 NFL draft. It was later revealed that Wright had a torn rotator cuff, which he underwent surgery to repair in May 2006. In late July, Wright signed a four-year contract with the team.

Wright was not healthy enough to play during his rookie season. He spent all of 2006 on the non-football injury list.

Fully recovered from shoulder surgery, Wright practiced at defensive end as the backup to Vonnie Holliday during the team's April minicamps. Wright started his first game on October 7, 2007, against the Houston Texans. He played in 13 games with nine starts and registered 38 tackles, 1.5 sacks, a pass defensed and a fumble recovery.

Wright was waived on September 5, 2009.

=== New York Jets ===
Wright signed with the New York Jets on March 16, 2010. Wright would later be waived by the team on August 29, 2010.

=== Saskatchewan Roughriders ===
Wright signed with the Saskatchewan Roughriders on October 27, 2010 as an injury replacement at the end of the 2010 season., but was waived prior to the 2011 season. The Roughriders went to the Grey Cup game that year.

=== Dallas Vigilantes ===
Wright joined the Arena Football League and was assigned to the Dallas Vigilantes on July 13, 2011. He played in one game with them against Chicago on July 16th where he recorded an assist, but by July 27th, he was off the roster.

== Coaching career ==
=== Sam Houston State ===
Prior to his time at East Carolina, Wright spent four years at Sam Houston State. During his tenure, the Bearkats posted a 46–12 overall record, a 31-4 Southland Conference mark, reached the semifinals of the NCAA Division I Football Championship Subdivision (FCS) playoffs three times and the quarterfinals in another year. He also helped Sam Houston State to a pair of conference titles and top-five national ranking all four seasons.

Under Wright's tutelage, Sam Houston State defensive lineman P.J. Hall earned a spot on more than 10 All-America teams, including the Associated Press squad. He was a three-time finalist for the Buck Buchanan Award, which is symbolic of FCS Defensive Player-of-the-Year honors. He ranked among the nation's top 10 with 19.0 tackles for loss as a senior and finished his career with a school- and FCS-record 84.0 TFLs before being selected by the Oakland Raiders in the second round of the 2018 NFL Draft.

=== East Carolina ===
In Wright's lone season at East Carolina, the defense broke the American Athletic Conference (AAC) single-game record for tackles for loss with 15 against Old Dominion and eclipsed the school and league single-season marks with 105 TFL that season.

Under his tutelage at ECU, defensive end Nate Harvey was named AAC Defensive Player of the Year and first-team all-conference after posting 63 tackles, 25.5 tackles for loss, 14.5 sacks, four quarterback hurries, two forced fumbles and a fumble recovery. Harvey broke the school and AAC single-season TFL record and also matched set the conference single-season sacks standard in 2018.

=== UTSA ===
Wright, a former All-America defensive lineman at Texas, came to San Antonio from East Carolina, where he was the Pirates’ defensive line coach for the 2018 season.

Wright, who will continue to oversee the defensive line in 2021, played a key role on the defensive staff in 2020, including helping to coordinate the defense during the last two months of the campaign. The Roadrunners finished with a 7–5 record, a second-place finish in Conference USA's West Division with a 5–2 mark and an appearance in the SERVPRO First Responder Bowl. UTSA led C-USA in sacks (25), tackles for loss (85), interceptions (11), takeaways (19) and turnover margin (+7). In fact, the Roadrunners ranked in the top 30 nationally in five categories — 19th in turnovers gained, 23rd in passes intercepted, 25th in fumbles recovered (8), 26th in turnover margin and 29th in tackles for loss per game (7.1).

Three of his defensive linemen — Lorenzo Dantzler, Jaylon Haynes and Brandon Matterson — earned honorable mention all-conference recognition, while Christian Clayton was named to the 2020 C-USA All-Freshman Team.

Rod Wright is in his third season as a member of UTSA's defensive coaching staff. He was promoted to co-defensive coordinator in January 2021 after serving as run game coordinator and defensive line coach in 2020. Prior to that, he coached the Roadrunners' d-line during the 2019 campaign.

=== Miami ===
On March 3, 2022, Wright was hired as the defensive end coach at the University of Miami under head coach Mario Cristobal.

=== Houston Texans ===
On February 25, 2023, Wright was hired as the assistant defensive line coach for the Houston Texans under head coach DeMeco Ryans. On February 28 when Jacques Cesaire left to be the Cleveland Browns defensive line coach Wright was promoted to defensive line coach.

== Personal ==
Wright's uncle, Elmo Wright, holds the University of Houston records for receiving yards and receiving touchdowns, and was a first-round pick for the Kansas City Chiefs in 1971. Wright is a cousin of former Longhorns defensive end Cedric Woodard, who previously played for the Seattle Seahawks.
