= Greg Eslinger =

American football player (born 1983)

No. 67, 50
- Position: Center

Personal information
- Born: April 23, 1983 (age 43); Bismarck, North Dakota, U.S.
- Listed height: 6 ft 3 in (1.91 m)
- Listed weight: 292 lb (132 kg)

Career information
- High school: Bismarck
- College: Minnesota (2002–2005)
- NFL draft: 2006: 6th round, 198th overall pick

Career history
- Denver Broncos (2006–2007); → Cologne Centurions (2007): Cleveland Browns (2007); Houston Texans (2007–2008)*; Denver Broncos (2008)*
- * Offseason or practice squad member only

Awards and highlights
- First-team All-NFL Europa (2007); Outland Trophy (2005); Rimington Trophy (2005); Jim Parker Trophy (2005); Unanimous All-American (2005); First-team All-American (2004); Third-team All-American (2003); Big Ten Offensive Lineman of the Year (2005); 3× First-team All-Big Ten (2003–2005)
- College Football Hall of Fame

Greg Eslinger (born April 23, 1983) is an American former professional football player who was a center in the National Football League (NFL). He played college football for the Minnesota Golden Gophers, where he won both the Outland Trophy and the Rimington Trophy, also received unanimous All-American honors. He was selected by the Denver Broncos in the sixth round of the 2006 NFL draft, and was a member of several NFL teams, but never played in a regular season game.

== College career ==
A Bismarck, North Dakota native, Eslinger attended the University of Minnesota, where he was a four-year starter for the Minnesota Golden Gophers football team from 2002 to 2005. He was a three-time first-team All-Big Ten selection (2003, 2004, 2005) and a unanimous All-American in 2005. As a senior in 2005, he was awarded the Outland Trophy, which is given to college football's best interior lineman, as well as the Dave Rimington Trophy, awarded to college football's top center. Eslinger was named as a member of the 2025 class of the College Football Hall of Fame on January 15, 2025.

=== Awards and honors ===
- Sporting News Freshman All-American (2002)
- Third-team All-American (2003)
- First-team All-Big Ten (2003–2005)
- FWAA All-American (2004)
- Rimington Trophy finalist (2004)
- Big Ten Offensive Lineman of the Year (2005)
- Lombardi Award semifinalist (2005)
- Unanimous All-American (2005)
- Outland Trophy (2005)
- Rimington Trophy (2005)

== Professional career ==
Pre-draft measurables
| Height | Weight | Arm length | Hand span | 40-yard dash | 10-yard split | 20-yard split | 20-yard shuttle | Three-cone drill | Vertical jump | Broad jump | Bench press |
|---|---|---|---|---|---|---|---|---|---|---|---|
| 6 ft 3 1/8 in (1.91 m) | 292 lb (132 kg) | 31 1/2 in (0.80 m) | 9 3/8 in (0.24 m) | 5.13 s | 1.75 s | 2.98 s | 4.68 s | 7.59 s | 30.0 in (0.76 m) | 8 ft 5 in (2.57 m) | 28 reps |
All values from NFL Combine

The Denver Broncos chose Eslinger in the sixth round (198th overall pick) of the 2006 NFL draft. He was on their injured reserve list and did not play during the 2006 NFL season. Assigned to the Cologne Centurions of the NFL Europa for 2007, he started at center and earned All-NFL Europa honors. The Broncos moved Eslinger to the practice squad at the beginning of 2007. On November 13, 2007, the Cleveland Browns picked him off the Bronco practice squad. On December 12, 2007, he was released from the Cleveland Browns. On December 19, 2007, he was signed to the Houston Texans practice squad. Eslinger was re-signed to the Bronco practice squad in the 2008 season.
