= Ramonce Taylor =

American gridiron football player (born 1985)

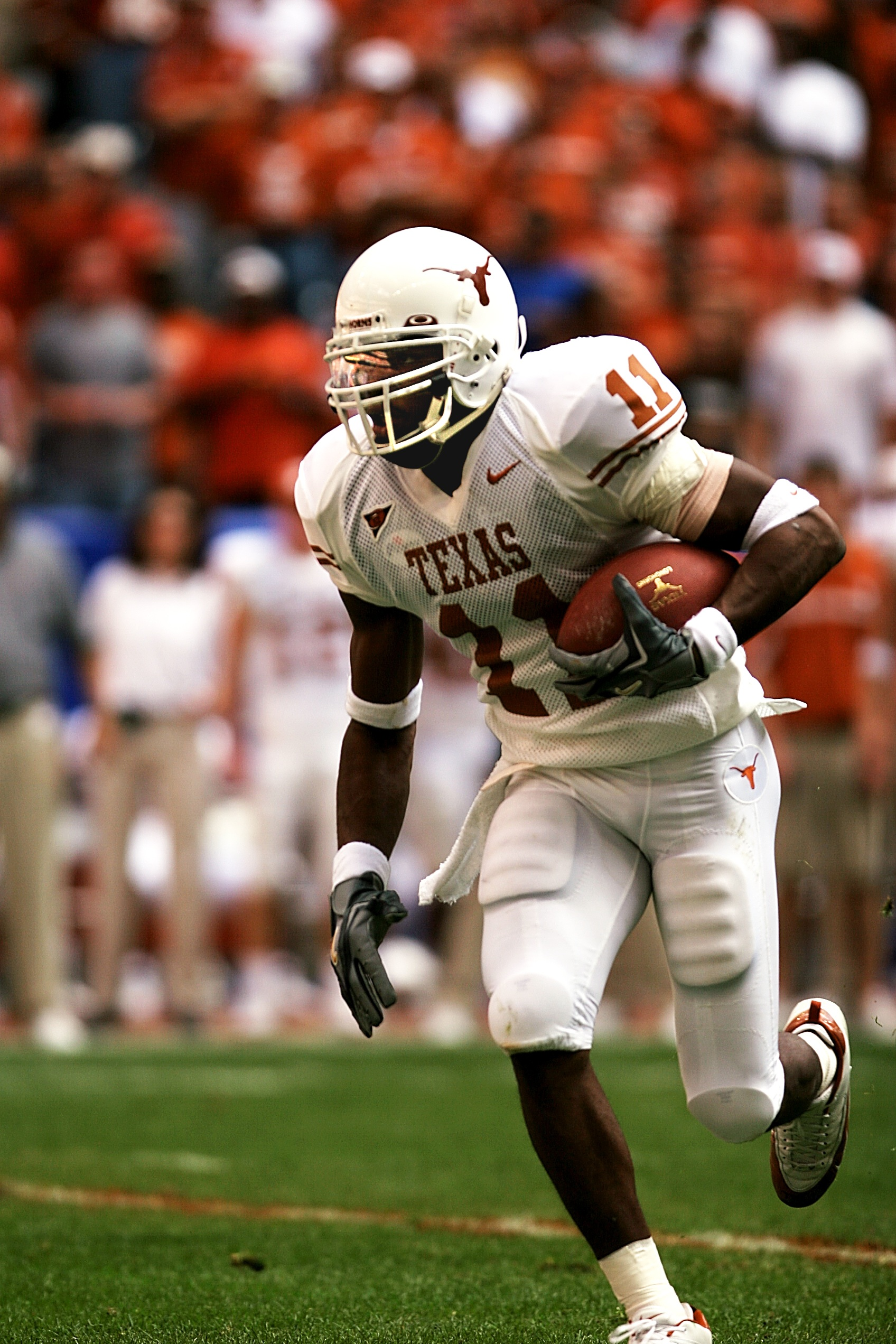
- Taylor in 2005

No. 11
- Positions: Running back, wide receiver, kick returner, quarterback

Personal information
- Born: September 11, 1985 (age 41); Temple, Texas, U.S.
- Listed height: 5 ft 11 in (1.80 m)
- Listed weight: 190 lb (86 kg)

Career information
- High school: Belton (Belton, Texas)
- College: Texas
- NFL draft: 2007: undrafted

Career history
- Rio Grande Valley Dorados (2009); Winnipeg Blue Bombers (2009)*; Edmonton Eskimos (2009–2010); Rio Grande Valley Magic (2011); Allen Wranglers/Texas Revolution (2012–2014); CenTex Cavalry (2017)
- * Offseason or practice squad member only

Awards and highlights
- BCS national champion (2005)

Ramonce DeRon Taylor Sr. (born September 11, 1985) is an American former football player best known for being the leading rusher on the 2005 National Championship Texas Longhorns football Team. He left the team early because of legal troubles and entered the NFL draft a year early. As a professional he spent two short stints in the Canadian Football League, but never played in a game. He also spent 6 seasons playing indoor football in the arenafootball2, IFL, SIFL and CIF leagues where he switched from running back to wide receiver and then, in his last season, quarterback.

== Early life ==
Taylor was born on September 11, 1985, in Temple, Texas. At Belton High School, Taylor was a multi-sport athlete who finished his high school career having set school records in three different sports.

In football, he produced a school record of 4,010 rushing yards and 62 touchdowns over three years. He was kicked off the team as a sophomore for what he called a "bad attitude" but worked his way back on. He led his team to the 2001 playoffs where they lost in the first round and set a school record for longest run from scrimmage (96 yards). In his junior year he set the school records for rushing yards in a season (1,529) and TDs (28) and rushing touchdowns in a game (6). He was named 1st team all district and 3rd-team all-state. In his senior year he led the team to a District Championship broke his own school record for yards in a season (2,371) and TDs (32) and broke the record for rushing yards in a game (347). That season he also played cornerback and punter. He was named district Offensive MVP and 1st team all-state. In 2005 he was named to the All-Time Centex Team.

Taylor was a four-year varsity track athlete. As a junior he won the state championship in the long jump with a 25' jump that was in the top mark in the country that year and as a result he was named a high school All-American. That summer he placed 3rd and 2nd in a pair of national high school meets. As a senior, he won both the long jump and triple jump at the District championship and also finished in 2nd in the 100 meters, 400 meters relay and 800 meter relay. He also won the long jump and triple jump at the regional championship and helped Belton to finish in 2nd at the meet. At the state championship he repeated as the long jump champion, came in 4th in the 100 meters and 7th in the triple jump.

In basketball, he helped Belton win the 2002 district championship for the first time in 35 years and advance to the 2nd round of the playoffs while earning 1st team all-district honors. He helped them to the 2nd round of the playoffs again in 2003, repeated as 1st team all district and was also named All-Centex by the Austin American Statesman. Belton won a share of the championship in his senior year and made it to the 3rd round of the playoffs. He was named 1st team all-district; 2nd team all-region; and 2nd team All-Centex as a senior and set the 37 year-old record for most points in a game (44) in an upset victory over #8 Amarillo.

== College career ==
Taylor played football at Texas in 2004–05.

In 2004, he accumulated 284 yards rushing, backing up Cedric Benson and helped the team get to the Rose Bowl, which they won.

In the 2005 season, his second with the Longhorns, he scored 4 TDs in his first 5 games, became a starter and compiled a total of 1,219 offensive yards for 15 touchdowns, which led the team. He was all an All-Big 12 Honorable Mention on an undefeated team that won the Big 12 and the BCS Championship.

After the National Champions game, Taylor started making some "bad decisions". He got into academic trouble and in May 2005, he was arrested on marijuana charges. Longhorn coach Mack Brown dismissed Taylor from the team due to academic and legal troubles. In September 2006, he pleaded guilty to the felony drug charges and was sentenced to 60 days in jail and five years deferred adjudication. He avoided jail time by participating in a work release program.

He attempted to transfer to Texas College, an NAIA school, and play football there – as he was academically ineligible to return to Texas – but could not get academically cleared to play in 2006.

With his college career over, he played in the Texas vs The Nation All-Star game in 2007.

== Professional career ==
Taylor entered the draft early, as a junior, and was expected to be taken in the 2007 NFL draft. He was invited to the NFL combine but after posting a 4.5 in the 40, he went undrafted. He was also not signed as a free agent.

In late 2007 he went to a tryout with the CenTex Barracudas.

Disappointed with his football career, Taylor went back to drinking too much and smoking weed. In February 2008, he was given a workout by the Kansas City Chiefs that went well enough for the Chiefs to offer him a 3 year contract, but just 7 days later he was sentenced to jail for 5 months for violating his probation and the deal fell apart.

=== Rio Grande Valley Dorados (first stint) ===
On January 15, 2009, Taylor signed with the af2 and was assigned to the Rio Grande Valley Dorados' training camp roster. He played one game for the Dorados before leaving for the Canadian Football League (CFL) in early April.

=== Winnipeg Blue Bombers ===
On June 4, 2009, the Winnipeg Blue Bombers of the CFL signed him to a contract. He was released on June 19, 2009, after muffing a punt in a pre-season game and with coach Mike Kelly questioning his maturity. He returned to the Dorados.

=== Rio Grande Valley Dorados (second stint) ===
Taylor returned to the Dorados for the last 6 games of the season. They lost in the first game of the playoffs to Bossier-Shreveport.

=== Edmonton Eskimos ===
On October 7, 2009, Taylor was signed by the Edmonton Eskimos of the CFL, but did not appear in any games that season. On June 22, 2010, before the 2010 season started, he was cut by the Eskimos.

=== Rio Grande Valley Magic ===
In March 2011, Taylor was signed by the Rio Grande Valley Magic of the Southern Indoor Football League (SIFL). He suffered a hamstring injury in the 3rd game of the season but recovered without missing a game, though other injuries hampered the start of his season. Taylor was the team's backup quarterback and when starting quarterback Billy Garza was injured at the end of a late April game, Taylor – who had 4 touchdowns already – filled in, throwing an incomplete pass on 4th and goal that sealed the Magic's loss. In that same game, he had the SIFL's season-high single game KO return performance with 216 yards. The team went 6–6 and lost in the first round of the playoffs.

=== Allen Wranglers ===
In 2012, Taylor signed with the Allen Wranglers of the Indoor Football League (IFL) after the team had signed Terrell Owens and about a month into the season. Taylor found himself playing sparingly in his first 5 games, mostly handling kickoff returns. But after Owens was waived, Taylor got more playing time and was named IFL offensive player of the week for week 15 and special teams player of the week in weeks 14 and 17. Despite a late start, he ended the season 3rd in the League in kickoff return TDs (5) and kickoff return average (22.5). He had over 900 yards in KO returns, 200 yards of receiving, 11 touchdowns and 142 tackles on defense. The Wranglers lost in the first round of the playoffs despite Taylor scoring 3 touchdowns on 93 yards receiving. In that game Taylor set two league post-season records with 165 yards in kickoff return yards in a game and 256 All-Purpose Yards in a game, including the 3rd longest post season KO Return of 56 yards and also had the 2nd highest KO return average in the IFL playoffs per season and 3rd highest per game with 27.5 yards per return.

=== Texas Revolution ===
At the end of the 2012 season, the Wranglers folded and were replaced by the Texas Revolution, which promptly signed Taylor. The Revolution went 5–9 and missed the playoffs in a season where Taylor played in 9 games.

In March 2014, the Revolution re-signed Taylor, but not until after week 4. Despite his late start he had the team's 2nd most all-purpose yards (1088), rushing yards (92), receiving yards (585) and return yards (41) while also scoring 11 touchdowns and recording 6 tackles. He also went 7 for 19 passing for 142 yards with 2 touchdowns and 3 interceptions. He earned honorable mention player of the week honors 3 times – once on special teams and twice on offense – in April of that season. That season he set the IFL record for most receiving yards in a game with 213 yards against Colorado. The Team went 3–11 and missed the playoffs.

In 2015 he worked out with Robert Griffin III and Adrian Peterson in the hopes of giving the NFL one last shot as a slot receiver, while also returning to Texas to finish his degree and working as a wide receiver's coach at St. Andrew's High School.

=== Centex Cavalry ===
On March 30, 2017, Taylor was signed by the CenTex Cavalry of Champions Indoor Football, which was about a month into the season. For the Cavalry he continued to return kicks, play defense, catch and run the ball, but he played more quarterback than any of the other offensive positions. He went 22 for 43 for 314 yards passing with 7 touchdowns and 2 interceptions. He also ran for 96 yards and 7 touchdowns on 34 attempts and had 47 yards receiving with 0 touchdowns on 6 receptions. As a kickoff returner he had 648 return yards and 1 touchdown on 32 returns. He even played kicker in one game sending both of his kickoffs out of bounds. The Cavalry went winless that season, did not make the playoffs and was shut down at the end of the season.

== Later life ==
After his football career, Taylor moved into coaching.
