= Jimmy Williams (cornerback, born 1984) =

American football player (born 1984)

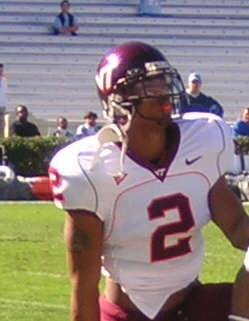
- Williams while playing for Virginia Tech in 2004

No. 24
- Position: Cornerback

Personal information
- Born: March 8, 1984 (age 42); Hampton, Virginia, U.S.
- Listed height: 6 ft 2 in (1.88 m)
- Listed weight: 216 lb (98 kg)

Career information
- High school: Bethel (Hampton)
- College: Virginia Tech (2002–2005)
- NFL draft: 2006: 2nd round, 37th overall pick

Career history
- Atlanta Falcons (2006–2007); San Francisco 49ers (2009)*; Spokane Shock (2014); New Orleans VooDoo (2015)
- * Offseason or practice squad member only

Awards and highlights
- Jack Tatum Trophy (2005); Unanimous All-American (2005); 2× First-team All-ACC (2004, 2005)

Career NFL statistics
- Total tackles: 48
- Pass deflections: 3
- Interceptions: 1
- Stats at Pro Football Reference
- Stats at ArenaFan.com

James Franklin Williams Jr. (born March 8, 1984) is an American former professional football player who was a cornerback for the Atlanta Falcons and San Francisco 49ers of the National Football League (NFL). He played college football for the Virginia Tech Hokies, earning unanimous All-American honors. Williams was selected by the Atlanta Falcons in the second round of the 2006 NFL draft, but was later suspended for violating the NFL's banned substances policy.

== Early life ==
Williams was born in Hampton, Virginia. As a child, he played for the Hampton Tornados in a youth football league. He attended Bethel High School as a senior, playing for the Bethel Bruins high school football team. He played the previous three seasons for Hampton High School, winning a state championship in 1998. Williams was known for his versatility during his prep career, competing at quarterback, safety, wide receiver, and outside linebacker. He earned All-Peninsula District honors as a junior and senior, adding first-team honors in 2001, and was elected to the Newport News Daily Press All-Star team as a senior. In his final season, he collected over 100 tackles with two sacks and intercepted seven passes, returning two for touchdowns as a safety and outside linebacker. On offense, he compiled over 1,000 yards of total offense as a quarterback, passing for five touchdowns and rushing for six. He also returned punts and kicks.

== College career ==
Williams enrolled at Virginia Polytechnic Institute and State University, where he played for coach Frank Beamer's Virginia Tech Hokies football team as a free safety from 2002 to 2005. He played sparingly his first year, backing up All-American Willie Pile.

In 2003 season, Williams moved into the starting job, and scored his first career touchdown, taking a 55-yard interception to the endzone against Rutgers.

In the Hokies' 2004 ACC championship season, Williams moved from safety to cornerback and played a critical role in two close games. In a 17–10 win against Wake Forest, Williams intercepted a Ben Mauk pass in Hokie territory and returned it to midfield to set up a Tech scoring drive. On Wake's final drive of the game, Williams broke up a pass in the endzone on third down that would have tied the game and potentially sent it into overtime. Against North Carolina, Williams intercepted a pass from Darian Durant just before halftime that set up a Hokies field goal.

During his senior year at Tech, Williams was a finalist for the Jim Thorpe Award and a unanimous first-team All-American. Williams nickname during his senior year at Tech was called "the trash talker supreme".

== Professional career ==
Pre-draft measurables
Height	Weight	Arm length	Hand span	40-yard dash	20-yard shuttle	Three-cone drill	Vertical jump	Broad jump	Bench press
6 ft 2 3/8 in (1.89 m)	213 lb (97 kg)	33 in (0.84 m)	8 3/4 in (0.22 m)	4.44 s	4.15 s	6.69 s	33.0 in (0.84 m)	9 ft 6 in (2.90 m)	12 reps
All values from NFL Combine/Pro Day

=== Atlanta Falcons ===
Williams was selected in the second round (37th overall) of the 2006 NFL draft by the Atlanta Falcons. In his rookie season with the Falcons, Williams started five games and made 33 tackles.

On June 2, 2007, Williams was cited in Richmond, Virginia for possession of marijuana during the 2007 offseason. Due to the NFL's personal conduct policy, he was suspended by Roger Goodell for the first five games of the 2008 season. Williams was released by the Falcons on June 17, 2008. He served the five-game suspension as a free agent and was not signed the rest of the year.

=== San Francisco 49ers ===
After spending the 2008 season out of football, Williams was signed to a future contract by the San Francisco 49ers on January 22, 2009.

Williams has been suspended for at least one year for violating the NFL's substance abuse policy,

=== Spokane Shock ===
On January 6, 2014, Williams was assigned to the Spokane Shock of the Arena Football League. He was placed on Injured Reserve on March 14, 2014. Williams was released from injured reserve on June 5, 2014.

=== New Orleans VooDoo ===
On March 6, 2015, Williams was traded to the New Orleans VooDoo for future considerations.
