= Deuce Lutui =

Tongan born American football player (born 1983)

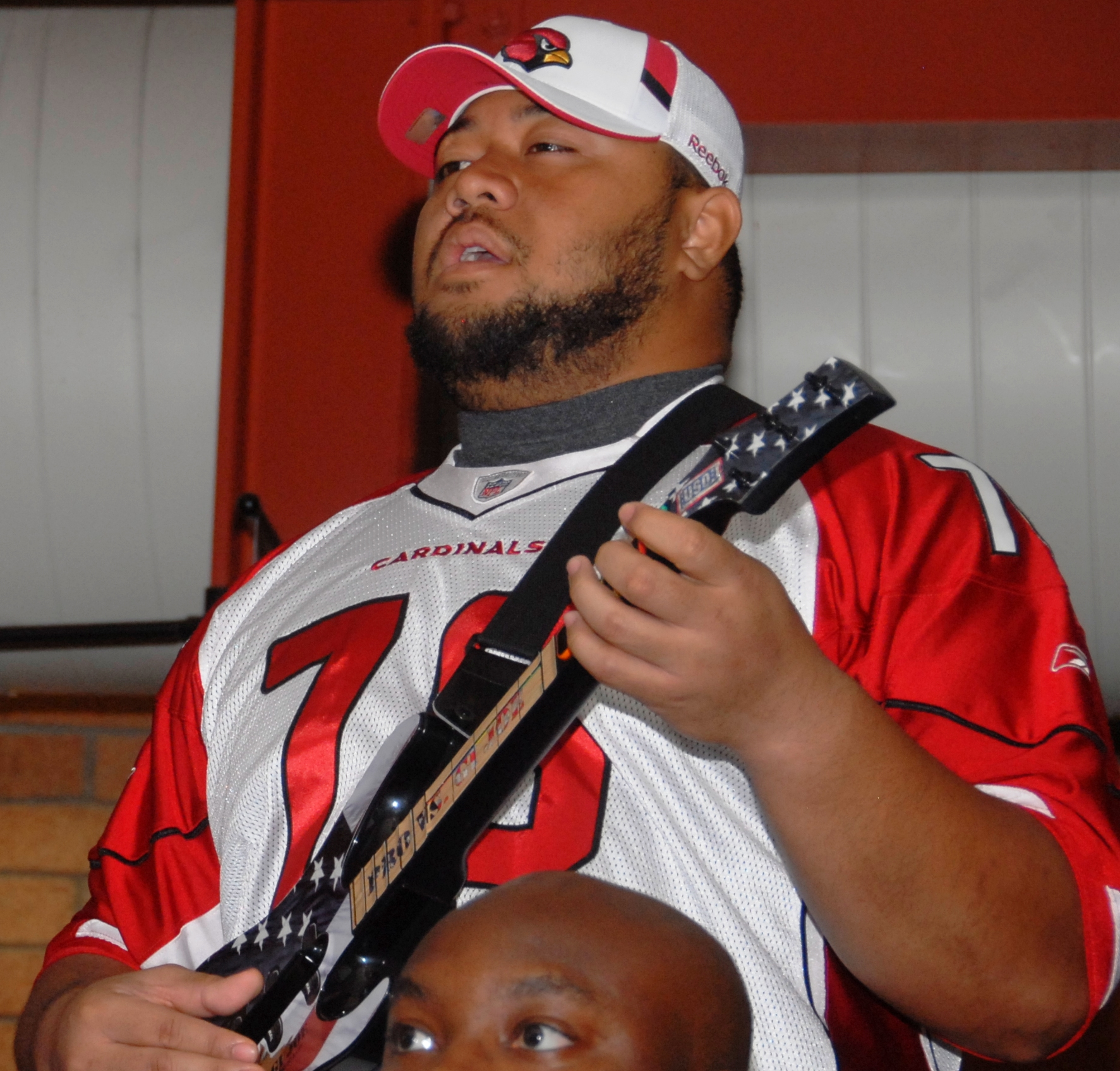
- Lutui in 2009

No. 72, 76
- Position: Guard

Personal information
- Born: May 5, 1983 (age 43); Ha'apai, Tonga
- Listed height: 6 ft 4 in (1.93 m)
- Listed weight: 338 lb (153 kg)

Career information
- High school: Mesa (Mesa, Arizona, U.S.)
- College: Mesa CC (2002); Snow (2003); USC (2004–2005)
- NFL draft: 2006: 2nd round, 41st overall pick

Career history
- Arizona Cardinals (2006−2011); Seattle Seahawks (2012)*; Tennessee Titans (2012)
- * Offseason or practice squad member only

Awards and highlights
- Consensus All-American (2005); First-team All-Pac-10 (2005)

Career NFL statistics
- Games played: 101
- Games started: 80
- Fumble recoveries: 1
- Stats at Pro Football Reference

Taitusi "Deuce" Lutui (born May 4, 1983) is a Tongan former player of American football who was a guard for seven seasons in the National Football League (NFL). He played college football for the USC Trojans, earning consensus All-American honors in 2005. He was selected by the Arizona Cardinals in the second round of the 2006 NFL draft, and also played for the NFL's Tennessee Titans. One of several Tongans who have played in the NFL, he is a cousin of Vai Sikahema, the first Tongan ever to play in the NFL.

== Early life ==
Lutui was born in Haʻapai in the Pacific island nation of Tonga. One of six siblings, he is a younger cousin of Vai Sikahema, who became the first Tongan to play in the National Football League when he joined the Arizona Cardinals as a kick returner in 1986. When Lutui was a few months old, his father, Inoke Lutui, moved the family to the United States, settling in Mesa, Arizona, a suburb of Phoenix. When he was six years old, Lutui survived a car accident that killed one of his sisters and left his father permanently disabled. As a teenager, Lutui had to work to support his family.

Lutui attended Mesa High School, where he played two-way lineman for the school's football team. In 2001, he was named Super Prep All-Farwest, Prep Star All-West, All-State, all-region and all-conference as a two-way lineman for Mesa High School.

== College career ==
After high school Lutui signed with the University of Southern California to play for the USC Trojans football team. However, he failed to qualify for admission to the school. Instead, he spent a year at Mesa Community College, where he played for the school's junior college football team. He then transferred to Snow College in Ephraim, Utah, where he received a number of junior college football honors. By 2004, he had improved his grades enough to enroll at USC.

Lutui was a first-team All-Pac-10 selection and a consensus first-team All-American at guard for the Trojans in 2005. At 370 pounds, he was the heaviest USC Trojans player of all time.

== Professional career ==
Pre-draft measurables
Height	Weight	Arm length	Hand span	40-yard dash	10-yard split	20-yard split	20-yard shuttle	Three-cone drill	Vertical jump	Broad jump	Bench press
6 ft 3 5/8 in (1.92 m)	334 lb (151 kg)	32 1/4 in (0.82 m)	10 3/8 in (0.26 m)	5.35 s	1.80 s	3.07 s	4.76 s	8.04 s	32.0 in (0.81 m)	8 ft 5 in (2.57 m)	26 reps
All values from NFL Combine/Pro Day

=== Arizona Cardinals ===
Lutui was selected in the second round (41st overall) of the 2006 NFL draft by the Arizona Cardinals, where he was reunited with former USC teammate Matt Leinart. As a rookie, Lutui started 9 games. In 2007, he started 15 games. In 2008, he started 16 games while the Cardinals won the NFC West with a 9–7 record and was part of an offensive line that allowed Cardinals quarterback Kurt Warner to break single season records in completions and touchdown passes. They then had a surprising playoff run getting to Super Bowl XLIII. During the Super Bowl, the Pittsburgh Steelers's offensive line featured Chris Kemoeatu, the other Tongan in the NFL. In 2009, he started 16 games as the Cardinals once again became NFC West champions with a 10–6 record.

The Cincinnati Bengals signed him to a two-year deal on July 29, 2011. On July 31, 2011, Kent Somers of The Arizona Republic revealed that Lutui failed his physical with the Bengals, and had re-signed with the Arizona Cardinals for one year.

=== Seattle Seahawks ===
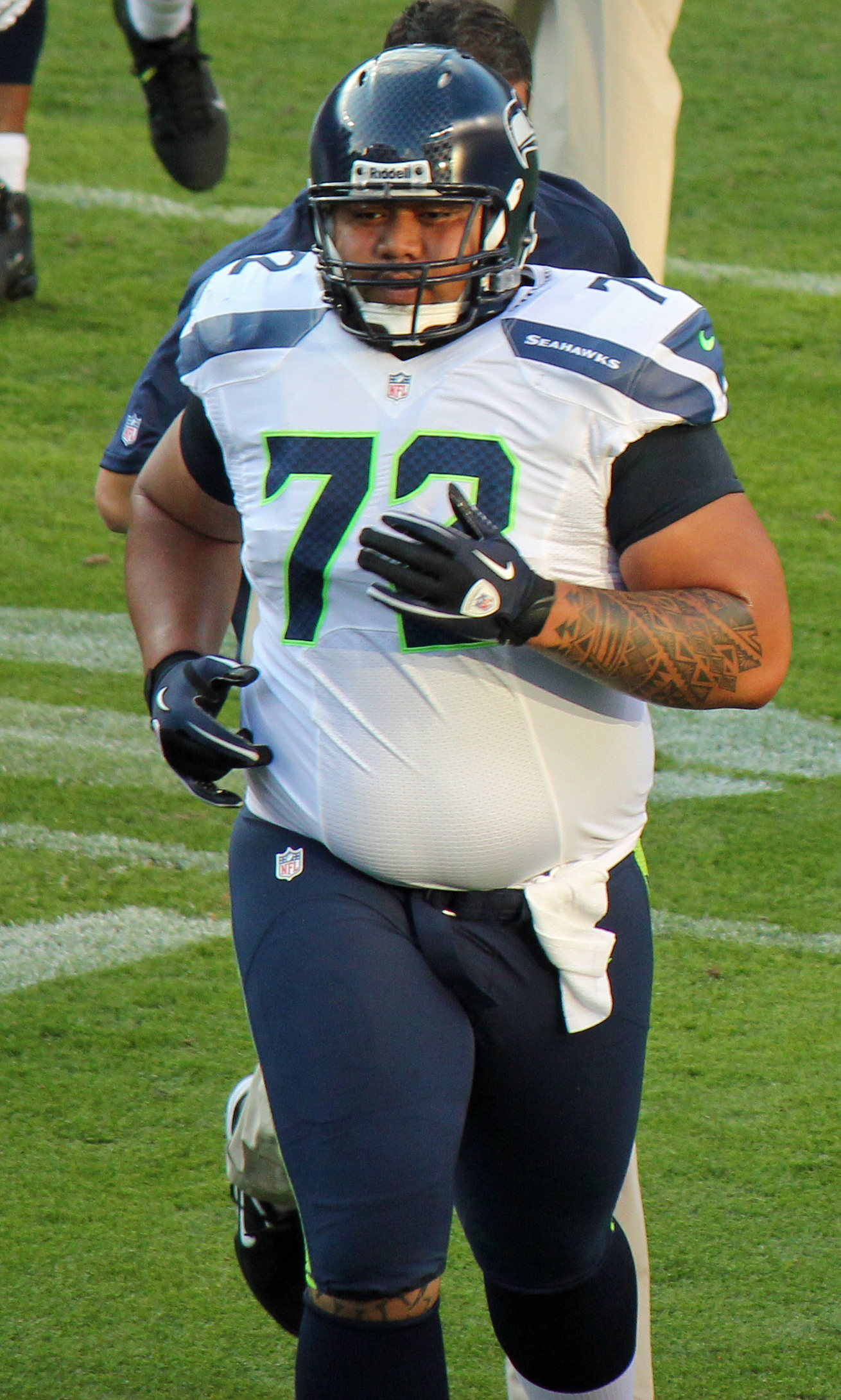
Lutui in the 2012 preseason.

Lutui signed with the Seattle Seahawks on April 6, 2012.

Lutui was released by the Seahawks on August 26, 2012, at the end of training camp.

=== Tennessee Titans ===
The Tennessee Titans signed Lutui to a one-year deal on September 10, 2012. He went on to start eight games at right guard. In March 2013, he was suspended four games by the NFL for violating the league's policy on performance-enhancing substances.

== Personal life ==
Lutui is a devout member of The Church of Jesus Christ of Latter-Day Saints. He is also an Eagle Scout. In 2004, he married the former Puanani Heimuli; they have six children.

On July 2, 2010, Lutui became a naturalized citizen of the United States.

Lutui follows a semi-vegan diet to help control his weight.
