= Jonathan Scott (American football) =

American football player (born 1983)

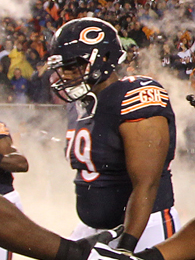
- Scott with the Chicago Bears in 2012

No. 72, 73, 79, 64
- Position: Offensive tackle

Personal information
- Born: January 10, 1983 (age 43); Dallas, Texas, U.S.
- Listed height: 6 ft 6 in (1.98 m)
- Listed weight: 318 lb (144 kg)

Career information
- High school: Dallas Carter
- College: Texas
- NFL draft: 2006: 5th round, 141st overall pick

Career history
- Detroit Lions (2006–2007); Buffalo Bills (2008–2009); Pittsburgh Steelers (2010–2011); Detroit Lions (2012)*; Chicago Bears (2012–2013); Atlanta Falcons (2014)
- * Offseason or practice squad member only

Awards and highlights
- BCS National Championship (2006); Unanimous All-American (2005); Second-team All-American (2004); 2× First-team All-Big 12 (2004, 2005)

Career NFL statistics
- Games played: 71
- Games started: 35
- Fumble recoveries: 2
- Stats at Pro Football Reference

Jonathan Ray Scott (born January 10, 1983) is an American former professional football player who was an offensive tackle in the National Football League (NFL). He played college football for the Texas Longhorns, unanimous All-American honors and helping the team win the 2005 BCS Championship. He had an eight-year, injury-plagued pro football career during which he played for the Detroit Lions, Buffalo Bills, Pittsburgh Steelers, Chicago Bears and Atlanta Falcons. He was selected by the Lions in the fifth round of the 2006 NFL draft and was the starting left tackle for the Steelers in Super Bowl XLV.

== Early life ==
Scott was born in Dallas, Texas. He attended David W. Carter High School in Dallas, where he was a three-sport athlete. In football, he played defensive tackle. While in high school, Scott played in the first-ever U.S. Army All-American Bowl on December 30, 2000.

== College career ==
Scott enrolled in the University of Texas, where he played for coach Mack Brown's Texas Longhorns football team from 2002 to 2005. In 2002 he was the starting right tackle but moved the left side in 2003. He was 3rd Team All-Big 12 Conference at offensive tackle in his Sophomore season and first-team in 2004 and 2005. In 2005, he was a unanimous first-team All-American and a played in the Rose Bowl when Texas defeated the USC Trojans 41–38 to win the BCS National Championship.

== Professional career ==
Pre-draft measurables
Height	Weight	Arm length	Hand span	40-yard dash	10-yard split	20-yard split	20-yard shuttle	Three-cone drill	Vertical jump	Broad jump
6 ft 6 3/8 in (1.99 m)	315 lb (143 kg)	34 in (0.86 m)	10 in (0.25 m)	5.35 s	1.84 s	3.06 s	4.85 s	7.73 s	24.5 in (0.62 m)	8 ft 5 in (2.57 m)
All values from NFL Combine

=== Detroit Lions (first stint) ===
Scott was selected by the Detroit Lions in the fifth round of the 2006 NFL draft. He played for Detroit for two seasons, playing in 20 games and starting 6. Though not expected to start in his rookie year, he became a starter before breaking his hip in the last game of the season that required surgery to repair. He spent the last five weeks of the 2007 season on the injured reserve. He was waived by the Lions during final cuts before the 2008 season on August 30, 2008.

=== Buffalo Bills ===
Late in the 2008 season, on December 18, he was signed by the Buffalo Bills, but did not play any that season. In 2009, he started 8 games for Buffalo and played in 2 more but spent some time inactive due to ankle and eye injuries. The Bills did not re-sign him after the season.

=== Pittsburgh Steelers ===
On March 8, 2010, Scott agreed to a contract with the Pittsburgh Steelers. He played in every game for the Steelers that season and started the last 11 in place of starter Max Starks, including Super Bowl XLV, which the Steelers lost 31–25 to the Green Bay Packers. Leading into the 2011 season, Scott re-signed with the Steelers to a one-year deal on July 29, 2011. He started 5 games that season and played in another 8, but was released by the Steelers on July 19, 2012.

=== Detroit Lions (second stint) ===
A few days after being cut by the Steelers, on July 24, 2012, Scott signed with the Detroit Lions again, but was subsequently released again in late August after being placed on injured reserve.

=== Chicago Bears ===
A couple of weeks later, on September 10, 2012, Scott was picked up by the Chicago Bears. Chicago acquired Scott after first conducting a workout with Scott on September 1, 2012. After Gabe Carimi was benched, Scott replaced him and saw significant playing time in 5 of the last 6 games of the season, missing one game due to an injured hamstring. After becoming an unrestricted free agent in 2013 Scott signed a one-year deal to stay with the Bears on March 27. On September 4, 2013, Scott was released, but was re-signed on September 9. He spent the entire 2013 season inactive.

=== Atlanta Falcons ===
He signed with Atlanta after Peter Konz was placed on injured reserve. He played three snaps in one game for Atlanta and was inactive the rest of the season. He was not signed by anyone after the 2014 season.

== Personal life ==
His father, Ray Scott, was a defensive lineman and tight end at Prairie View A&M and was drafted by the New York Jets in the ninth round of the 1967 NFL/AFL draft.

He became an assistant football coach for John Paul II High School in Plano, TX.
