= 2005 All-America college football team =

Official list of the best college football players of 2005

The 2005 All-America college football team is composed of the following All-American Teams: Associated Press, Football Writers Association of America, American Football Coaches Association, Walter Camp Foundation, The Sporting News, Sports Illustrated, Pro Football Weekly, ESPN, CBS Sports, College Football News, and Rivals.com.

The All-America college football team is an honor given annually to the best American college football players at their respective positions. The original usage of the term All-America was with lists selected by Caspar Whitney starting in 1889. The NCAA officially recognizes All-Americans selected by the AP, AFCA, FWAA, TSN, and the WCFF to determine consensus All-Americans.

Eighteen players were recognized as consensus All-Americans for 2005, 12 of them unanimously. Unanimous selections are followed by an asterisk (*)

2005 Consensus All-Americans
Name	Position	Year	University
Vince Young	Quarterback	Junior	Texas
Reggie Bush*	Running back	Junior	USC
Jerome Harrison	Running back	Senior	Washington State
Dwayne Jarrett*	Wide receiver	Sophomore	USC
Jeff Samardzija	Wide receiver	Junior	Notre Dame
Marcedes Lewis	Tight end	Senior	UCLA
Greg Eslinger*	Center	Senior	Minnesota
Max Jean-Gilles	Offensive line	Senior	Georgia
Marcus McNeill	Offensive line	Senior	Auburn
Jonathan Scott*	Offensive line	Senior	Texas
Deuce Lutui	Offensive line	Senior	USC
Elvis Dumervil*	Defensive line	Senior	Louisville
Tamba Hali*	Defensive line	Senior	Penn State
Haloti Ngata	Defensive line	Senior	Oregon
Rodrique Wright	Defensive line	Senior	Texas
A. J. Hawk*	Linebacker	Senior	Ohio State
Demeco Ryans*	Linebacker	Senior	Alabama
Paul Posluszny	Linebacker	Senior	Penn State
Jimmy Williams*	Defensive back	Senior	Virginia Tech
Michael Huff*	Defensive back	Senior	Texas
Greg Blue	Defensive back	Senior	Georgia
Tye Hill	Defensive back	Senior	Clemson
Mason Crosby	Kicker	Junior	Colorado
Ryan Plackemeier*	Punter	Senior	Wake Forest
Maurice Drew*	Return specialist	Junior	UCLA

== Offense ==
=== Quarterback ===
- Vince Young, Texas (AP-1, FWAA, TSN, SI, PFW, ESPN, CBS, CFN, Rivals.com, WCFF-2)
- Matt Leinart, Southern California (AFCA, WCFF, AP-2)
- Brady Quinn, Notre Dame (AP-3)

=== Running backs ===
- Reggie Bush, Southern California (AP-1, AFCA, FWAA, TSN, WCFF, SI, PFW, ESPN, CBS, CFN, Rivals.com-All-purpose)
- Jerome Harrison, Washington State (AP-1, FWAA, TSN, SI, ESPN, CBS, CFN, Rivals.com, WCFF-2)
- DeAngelo Williams, Memphis (AFCA, WCFF, AP-2)
- Laurence Maroney, Minnesota (PFW, Rivals.com, AP-3, WCFF-2)
- Brian Calhoun, Wisconsin (AP-2)
- LenDale White, USC (AP-3)

=== Fullback ===
- Brian Leonard, Rutgers (PFW)

=== Wide receivers ===
- Dwayne Jarrett, Southern California (AP-1, AFCA, FWAA, TSN, WCFF, SI, CBS, CFN)
- Jeff Samardzija, Notre Dame (FWAA, TSN, SI, PFW, ESPN, CBS, CFN, Rivals.com, AP-2, WCFF-2)
- Mike Hass, Oregon State (AP-1, WCFF, ESPN)
- Calvin Johnson, Georgia Tech (AFCA, PFW, Rivals.com, AP-2, WCFF-2)
- Greg Jennings, Western Michigan (AP-3)
- Derek Hagan, Arizona State (AP-3)

=== Tight end ===
- Marcedes Lewis, UCLA (FWAA, TSN, WCFF, Rivals.com, AP-2)
- Vernon Davis, Maryland (AP-1, AFCA, PFW, CFN)
- Garrett Mills, Tulsa (SI, ESPN, CBS, AP-3, WCFF-2)

=== Linemen ===
- Jonathan Scott, Texas (AP-1, AFCA, FWAA, TSN, WCFF, SI, ESPN, CBS)
- Marcus McNeill, Auburn (AP-1, FWAA, TSN, WCFF, SI, ESPN, CFN, Rivals.com)
- Max Jean-Gilles, Georgia (AP-1, AFCA, TSN, WCFF, PFW, ESPN, CFN, Rivals.com)
- Taitusi Lutui, Southern California (AFCA, FWAA, TSN, SI, ESPN, CBS, Rivals.com, AP-2, WCFF-2)
- Eric Winston, Miami (FL) (AFCA, WCFF, SI, CBS, CFN, Rivals.com, AP-2)
- D'Brickashaw Ferguson, Virginia (AP-1, WCFF-2, PFW)
- Zach Strief, Northwestern (FWAA)
- Sam Baker, Southern California (CBS, AP-3)
- Justin Blalock, Texas (CFN, AP-3)
- Davin Joseph, Oklahoma (PFW, CFN)
- Joe Thomas, Wisconsin (PFW, WCFF-2)
- Levi Brown, Penn State (AP-2)
- Mark Setterstrom, Minnesota (AP-2)
- Andrew Whitworth, LSU (AP-3, WCFF-2)
- Will Allen, Texas (AP-3)

=== Center ===
- Greg Eslinger, Minnesota (AP-1, AFCA, FWAA, TSN, WCFF, SI, ESPN, CBS, Rivals.com)
- Nick Mangold, Ohio State (PFW, WCFF-2)
- Dan Mozes, West Virginia (AP-2)

== Defense ==
=== Ends ===
- Tamba Hali, Penn State (AP-1, AFCA, FWAA, TSN, WCFF, ESPN, CBS, Rivals.com)
- Elvis Dumervil, Louisville (AP-1, AFCA, FWAA, TSN, WCFF, SI, ESPN, CBS, CFN)
- Mario Williams, North Carolina State (SI, PFW, AP-3, WCFF-2)
- Mathias Kiwanuka, Boston College (AFCA, CBS, Rivals.com, AP-2, WCFF-2)
- Darryl Tapp, Virginia Tech (AFCA, CFN, AP-2, WCFF-2)
- Kamerion Wimbley, Florida State (PFW)
- Willie Evans, Mississippi State (AP-3)

=== Tackles ===
- Haloti Ngata, Oregon (AP-1, FWAA, TSN, WCFF, SI, ESPN, CFN, Rivals.com)
- Rodrique Wright, Texas (AP-1, TSN, WCFF, ESPN, CBS);
- Brodrick Bunkley, Florida State (FWAA, SI, PFW, AP-3);
- Claude Wroten, LSU (CFN);
- Kyle Williams, LSU (PFW, Rivals.com, AP-2, WCFF-2)
- Orien Harris, Miami (AP-2)
- Jesse Mahelona, Tennessee (AP-3)

=== Linebackers ===
- A. J. Hawk, Ohio State (AP-1, AFCA, FWAA, TSN, WCFF, SI, PFW, ESPN, CBS, CFN, Rivals.com)
- Paul Posluszny, Penn State (AP-1, FWAA, TSN, WCFF, SI, ESPN, CBS, Rivals.com)
- DeMeco Ryans, Alabama (AP-1, AFCA, FWAA, TSN, WCFF, ESPN, CBS, Rivals.com)
- D’Qwell Jackson, Maryland (AFCA, SI, AP-2, WCFF-2)
- Chad Greenway, Iowa (PFW, CFN, AP-2, WCFF-2)
- Patrick Willis, Ole Miss, (PFW, CFN, AP-2, WCFF-2)
- Aaron Harris, Texas (AP-3)
- Nick Reid, Kansas (AP-3)
- Bobby Carpenter, Ohio State (AP-3)

=== Backs ===
- Jimmy Williams, Virginia Tech (AP-1, AFCA, FWAA, TSN, WCFF, ESPN, CBS, CFN, Rivals.com)
- Michael Huff, Texas (AP-1, AFCA, FWAA, TSN, WCFF, SI, PFW, ESPN, CBS, CFN, Rivals.com)
- Greg Blue, Georgia (AP-1, AFCA, TSN, WCFF, SI, ESPN, CFN)
- Tye Hill, Clemson (TSN, WCFF, ESPN, Rivals.com, AP-2)
- Darnell Bing, Southern California (AP-1, Rivals.com, WCFF-2)
- Dion Byrum, Ohio (AFCA, AP-2)
- Ko Simpson, South Carolina (FWAA, CBS, CFN, AP-3)
- Brandon Meriweather, Miami-FL (FWAA, WCFF-2)
- Kelly Jennings, Miami-FL (SI, PFW, CBS, AP-2)
- Dwayne Slay, Texas Tech (SI)
- Alan Zemaitis, Penn State (PFW, AP-2, WCFF-2)
- Donte Whitner, Ohio State (PFW)
- Aaron Gipson, Oregon (AP-3, WCFF-2)
- LaRon Landry, LSU (AP-3)
- Tom Zbikowski, Notre Dame (AP-3)

== Special teams ==
=== Kicker ===
- Mason Crosby, Colorado (AP-1, FWAA, TSN, WCFF, SI, PFW, ESPN, CBS, CFNews, Rivals.com)
- Alexis Serna, Oregon State (AFCA, AP-2, WCFF-2)
- Brandon Coutu, Georgia (AP-3)

=== Punter ===
- Ryan Plackemeier, Wake Forest (AP-1, AFCA, FWAA, TSN, WCFF, SI, ESPN, CBS, CFN, Rivals.com)
- Danny Baugher, Arizona (PFW, AP-3)
- Daniel Sepulveda, Baylor (AP-2)
- John Torp, Colorado (WCFF-2)

=== Returners ===
- Maurice Drew, UCLA (AP-1[All-Purpose], AFCA-Return Specialist, FWAA, TSN, WCFF, SI-PR, PFWeekly-PR, CBS, CFN-PR)
- Cory Rodgers, TCU (WCFF-2, SI-KR, PFW-KR, ESPN)
- Felix Jones, Arkansas (CFN-KR)
- Skyler Green, LSU (Rivals.com-PR, AP-3)
- Ted Ginn Jr., Ohio State (Rivals.com-KR)
- Brandon Williams, Wisconsin (AP-2)

== See also ==
- 2005 All-Atlantic Coast Conference football team
- 2005 All-Big Ten Conference football team
- 2005 All-Big 12 Conference football team
- 2005 All-Pacific-10 Conference football team
- 2005 All-SEC football team
