= Dwayne Jarrett =

American gridiron football player (born 1986)

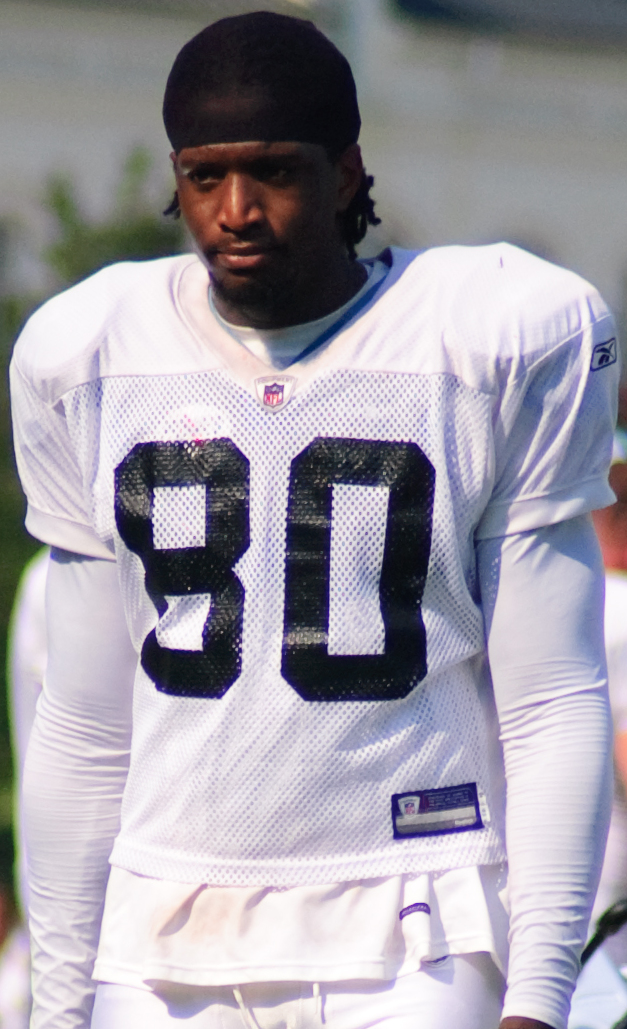
- Jarrett with the Carolina Panthers in 2009

No. 80
- Position: Wide receiver

Personal information
- Born: September 11, 1986 (age 40); New Brunswick, New Jersey, U.S.
- Listed height: 6 ft 4 in (1.93 m)
- Listed weight: 219 lb (99 kg)

Career information
- High school: New Brunswick
- College: USC (2004–2006)
- NFL draft: 2007: 2nd round, 45th overall pick

Career history
- Carolina Panthers (2007–2010); Saskatchewan Roughriders (2012)*
- * Offseason or practice squad member only

Awards and highlights
- Paul Warfield Trophy (2005); Unanimous All-American (2005); First-team All-American (2006); First-team All-Pac-10 (2005, 2006)

Career NFL statistics
- Receptions: 35
- Receiving yards: 428
- Receiving touchdowns: 1
- Stats at Pro Football Reference

Dwayne Jarrett (born September 11, 1986) is an American former professional football player who was a wide receiver for four seasons with the Carolina Panthers of the National Football League (NFL). He played college football for the USC Trojans, earning recognition as an All-American twice. Carolina selected him in the second round of the 2007 NFL Draft.

== Early life ==
Jarrett attended New Brunswick High School in New Brunswick, New Jersey. He was a 2003 Parade magazine All-American, Super Prep All-American, Prep Star All-American, Super Prep Elite 50, Prep Star Top 100 Dream Team, Super Prep All-Northeast Offensive MVP, and Prep Star All-East. Jarrett also played in the 2004 U.S. Army All-American Bowl. He was also New Jersey's Offensive Pick of the Year as a senior wideout and defensive back. He scored 26 touchdowns as a senior (with three of those touchdowns coming in New Brunswick's 21-14 state title victory), including five on 15 punt returns (for a 48-yard return average). He also played basketball in high school.

== College career ==
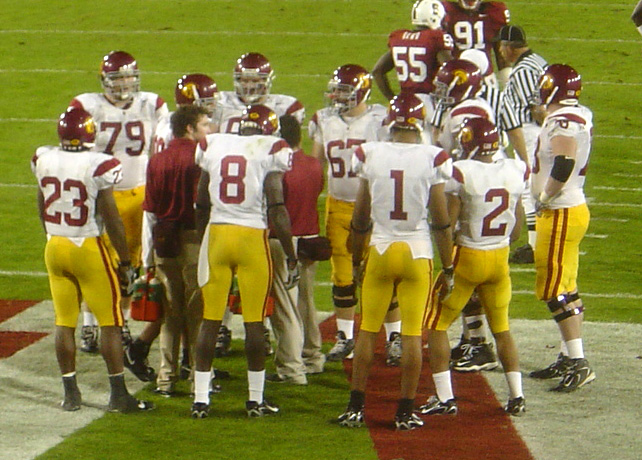
Jarrett (#8) in the huddle during a 2006 game

Jarrett attended the University of Southern California, where he played for coach Pete Carroll's USC Trojans football team from 2004 to 2006. He was a unanimous All-American in 2005, and a first-team All-American in 2006. He was USC's all-time receptions leader with 216 and the Pacific-10 Conference's all-time leader in touchdown receptions with 41.

As a freshman, he helped Trojan fans get over the loss of former USC standout wide receiver Mike Williams. He played in all 13 games and started 8 of them. He caught 55 passes for 849 yards and 13 touchdowns. He also made 5 catches for 115 yards in USC's FedEx Orange Bowl victory over Oklahoma in 2004.

As a sophomore, he became a frequent target for quarterback Matt Leinart. He recorded 91 receptions for 1,274 yards including 4 touchdowns while starting 6 games in 2005. In that season'smatchup against Notre Dame, with the Trojans down three and under two minutes left on the clock, Jarrett caught a Leinart pass on a fourth-and-nine play and ran the ball for 61 yards. This catch set up the winning touchdown, the famed and controversial Bush Push quarterback sneak. In USC's Rose Bowl loss to the Texas Longhorns he had 10 catches for 121 yards and a touchdown.

He was a 2005 unanimous All-American as a sophomore and one of three finalists for the Biletnikoff Award. He was on the 2006 Maxwell Award watch list as the best player in college football.

His height, hands, and quickness made him one of the premier receivers going into the 2006 college football season. With the departure of former Trojan running backs Reggie Bush and LenDale White, he was expected to be a big part of the Trojans' offense.

After a brief period of ineligibility due to his apparently inappropriate living situation with Leinart, the NCAA reinstated him on August 9, 2006, making him eligible to play for the 2006 football season. Despite being hampered by injuries, including missing games, Jarrett was named to the rivals.com and Pac-10 Coaches 2006 All-Pac-10 team First-team. He was also second-team All-America at rivals.com and SI and Walter Camp foundation first-team All-America. However, because of his lack of playing time, he was left off the 2006 list of Biletnikoff Award finalists, an omission noted by some sports writers.

On January 1, 2007, he was named offensive most valuable player of the Rose Bowl Game with a career-high 203 receiving yards and two touchdowns in the 32–18 win over Michigan. Jarrett finished the 2006 season as USC's all-time leading receiver with 216 catches The junior, a two-time All-American, had 70 catches for 1,015 yards and led the Trojans with 12 touchdowns in his final college season.

Projected as a first-round pick in the 2007 NFL draft, on January 10, 2007, Jarrett declared his intent to leave USC early to enter the NFL. At a press conference, the tearful Jarrett noted the best part of his USC career was being with his "teammates" but that he was "definitely doing it for my family, because I wasn't the most fortunate kid growing up."

== Professional career ==
Pre-draft measurables
Height	Weight	40-yard dash	10-yard split	20-yard split	20-yard shuttle	Three-cone drill	Vertical jump	Broad jump
6 ft 4 in (1.93 m)	219 lb (99 kg)	4.62 s	1.58 s	2.64 s	4.20 s	7.28 s	36.5 in (0.93 m)	10 ft 1 in (3.07 m)
All values from NFL Combine/Pro Day

=== Carolina Panthers ===
Jarrett was selected in the second round (45th overall) of the 2007 NFL draft by the Carolina Panthers, he was the eighth receiver selected. Originally projected as a first-round pick, Jarrett's stock fell due to his unremarkable time in the 40-yard dash.

Jarrett often drew similarities to former Pro Bowl WR Keyshawn Johnson. Both were considered "possession" receivers and both played at USC. Although Johnson had publicly stated that he looked forward to mentoring Jarrett, it did not become a reality as Johnson was released three days after Jarrett was drafted. Johnson had initially stated that he would be best served by staying at USC an extra year and entering the draft as a senior.

After being inactive for 7 of the first 8 games, Jarrett was activated for week 9 against the Atlanta Falcons due to the injury of 2nd string receiver Keary Colbert. He had two catches for 28 yards and recorded a special-teams tackle. On the year he had 6 catches for 73 yards and one tackle.

In 2008, Jarrett played in 9 games, starting one. He had 10 receptions for 119 yards.

On November 1, 2009, Jarrett made his second career start in place of an injured Muhsin Muhammad, in a victory over the Arizona Cardinals.

On January 3, 2010, Dwayne caught his first touchdown pass from Matt Moore. A pass of 30 yards against division rival New Orleans Saints. The Panthers went on to win the game 23–10.

Jarrett was cut from the Panthers on October 5, 2010, following his second DUI arrest. He had been pulled over for speeding on I-77 near Charlotte just before 2:00 a.m., according to Charlotte-Mecklenburg police spokesman Bob Fey. Jarrett had declined to take a breath test and was, instead, given a blood test. He was released on a bond of $2,000.

During the week of November 21, 2010, Jarrett worked out with the Seattle Seahawks and his former college coach, Pete Carroll.

=== Saskatchewan Roughriders ===
On May 11, 2012, Jarrett was signed by the Saskatchewan Roughriders of the Canadian Football League. On June 7, 2012, the Roughriders placed him on the retired list.

== Career statistics ==
=== NFL ===
Year	Team	Games		Receiving				
Year	Team	GP	GS	Rec	Yds	Avg	Lng	TD
2007	CAR	7	0	6	73	12.2	22	0
2008	CAR	9	1	10	119	11.9	25	0
2009	CAR	13	2	17	196	11.5	30	1
2010	CAR	3	0	2	40	20.0	21	0
Total		32	3	35	428	12.2	30	1

=== College ===
Season	Team	GP	Receiving			
Season	Team	GP	Rec	Yds	Avg	TD
2004	USC	13	55	849	15.4	13
2005	USC	13	91	1,274	14.0	16
2006	USC	13	70	1,015	14.5	12
Total		39	316	3,138	14.5	41

== Personal life ==
Jarrett credits his ability to growing up and playing catch with his uncle who "forced me to make one-handed catches."

During his sophomore year, Jarrett shared a Los Angeles apartment with quarterback Matt Leinart.

Jarrett has had some of his best college games against USC's rival, the University of Notre Dame. Jarrett credits this to how he was treated during the high school recruiting process: "They came down to recruit me, they talked to my coaches and everything. They didn't think I was intelligent enough to go to their school. That was kind of an insult to me. I've always had a little grudge against them."

=== DWI ===
Jarrett was arrested and charged for DWI on the morning of March 11, 2008 in a Charlotte suburb of Mint Hill. A police officer witnessed Jarrett run a red light and performed a sobriety test, which Jarrett failed. He was released on $1,000 bond. Jarrett later pleaded guilty to his DWI charge. Jarrett got a 30-day suspended sentence, must pay $420 in fines, and perform 24 hours of community service and could be suspended by the league.

On Tuesday, October 5, 2010, he was arrested for his second DWI in less than three years, after being pulled over shortly after 2 a.m. in Charlotte, North Carolina.

== See also ==
- List of NCAA major college football yearly receiving leaders
- List of NCAA Division I FBS career receiving touchdowns leaders
