= DeMeco Ryans =

American football player and coach (born 1984)

Demeco Ryans
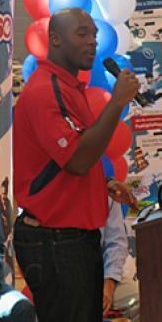
- Ryans in 2010

Houston Texans
- Title: Head coach

Personal information
- Born: July 28, 1984 (age 42); Bessemer, Alabama, U.S.
- Listed height: 6 ft 1 in (1.85 m)
- Listed weight: 247 lb (112 kg)

Career information
- Position: Linebacker (No. 59)
- High school: Jess Lanier (Bessemer)
- College: Alabama (2002–2005)
- NFL draft: 2006: 2nd round, 33rd overall pick

Career history

Playing
- Houston Texans (2006–2011); Philadelphia Eagles (2012–2015)

Coaching
- San Francisco 49ers (2017–2022); Defensive quality control coach (2017); Inside linebackers coach (2018–2020); Defensive coordinator (2021–2022); Houston Texans (2023–present) Head coach

Awards and highlights
- As a player: NFL Defensive Rookie of the Year (2006); Second-team All-Pro (2007); 2× Pro Bowl (2007, 2009); NFL solo tackles leader (2006); PFWA All-Rookie Team (2006); Lott Trophy (2005); SEC Defensive Player of the Year (2005); Unanimous All-American (2005); First-team All-SEC (2005); 2× Second-team All-SEC (2003, 2004); As a coach: AP NFL Assistant Coach of the Year (2022)

Career NFL statistics
- Total tackles: 971
- Sacks: 13.5
- Forced fumbles: 7
- Fumble recoveries: 10
- Interceptions: 7
- Stats at Pro Football Reference

Head coaching record
- Regular season: 35–25 (.583)
- Postseason: 3–3 (.500)
- Career: 38–28 (.576)
- Coaching profile at Pro Football Reference

DeMeco Ryans (/dɪˈmiːkoʊ/ dih-MEE-koh; born July 28, 1984) is an American professional football coach and former linebacker who is the head coach for the Houston Texans of the National Football League (NFL). He played college football for the Alabama Crimson Tide, where he was a unanimous All-American. Ryans was selected by the Texans in the second round of the 2006 NFL draft, where he was recognized as the Defensive Rookie of the Year. Ryans was selected to two Pro Bowls before being traded to the Philadelphia Eagles in 2012, where he spent four seasons before retiring.

Ryans joined the San Francisco 49ers as a coaching assistant in 2017 and coached the inside linebackers from 2018 to 2020 before being named their defensive coordinator in 2021. The following season, he was named NFL Assistant Coach of the Year after the 49ers finished with the top-ranked defense, leading in scoring and total yards allowed. Ryans was hired as the head coach for the Texans in 2023 and took them to the playoffs in his first three seasons in that role.

== Early life ==
Ryans was born on July 28, 1984, in Bessemer, Alabama. He attended Jess Lanier High School in Bessemer, where he played high school football. As a senior, Ryans had 135 tackles, 11 sacks, two forced fumbles, and two interceptions. Considered a three-star recruit by Rivals.com, he was listed as the No. 39 inside linebacker prospect in the nation from the class of 2002. Ryans picked Alabama over Mississippi State.

== College career ==
Ryans attended the University of Alabama, where he played outside linebacker for coach Mike Shula's Alabama Crimson Tide football team from 2002 to 2005.

Ryans started his career by earning a role on special teams and backup linebacker in his first season. By making great improvements every year in his college career, Ryans went on to become the SEC's Defensive Player of the Year for his performance in 2005. Later on, he attributed much of his collegiate success to his defensive coordinator at Alabama, Joe Kines. Ryans was named the 2006 Cotton Bowl Classic defensive MVP in their 13–10 victory over Texas Tech. Following his senior season, Ryans earned the Lott Trophy for his combination of athletic excellence and off-the-field achievements and was recognized as a unanimous All-American.

=== Awards and honors ===
- 2006 NCAA Top Eight Award (Class of 2006)
- 2006 Cotton Bowl Classic – Defensive MVP
- 2005 Unanimous first-team All-American
- 2005 SEC – Defensive Player of the Year
- 2005 First-team All-SEC
- 2005 Lott Trophy
- 2005 Bednarik Trophy Semifinalist
- 2005 Butkus Award Finalist
- 2005 Draddy Award Finalist
- 2005 Nagurski Award Finalist
- 2005 Lombardi Award Semifinalist
- 2004 Second-team All-SEC

== Professional career ==
Pre-draft measurables
| Height | Weight | Arm length | Hand span | 40-yard dash | 10-yard split | 20-yard split | 20-yard shuttle | Three-cone drill | Vertical jump | Broad jump | Bench press |
|---|---|---|---|---|---|---|---|---|---|---|---|
| 6 ft 1 1/4 in (1.86 m) | 236 lb (107 kg) | 31 3/8 in (0.80 m) | 8 5/8 in (0.22 m) | 4.67 s | 1.62 s | 2.73 s | 4.17 s | 7.19 s | 39 in (0.99 m) | 10 ft 9 in (3.28 m) | 23 reps |
All values from NFL Combine

=== Houston Texans ===
Ryans was selected with the first pick of the second round (33rd overall) in the 2006 NFL draft by the Texans. He was the highest-selected Alabama linebacker since Dwayne Rudd was selected 20th overall by the Minnesota Vikings in 1997. Though Ryans had been an outside linebacker in college, he earned the starting middle linebacker position due to his excellent performance in the preseason. In his first game, Ryans recorded a league-high 12 solo tackles against the Philadelphia Eagles. He had an overwhelming impact as a rookie, leading the Texans in tackles in the first half of the 2006 season. Ryans was named AFC Defensive Player of the Week for his performance during a Week 13 23–14 victory over the Oakland Raiders in which he recorded 15 tackles, three pass deflections, a sack, a forced fumble, a fumble recovery, and an interception.

Ryans was named the AP NFL Defensive Rookie of the Year after finishing second in the league with 155 total tackles (Zach Thomas led the NFL with 165), 31 more tackles than the next rookie (Detroit Lions linebacker Ernie Sims). Ryans was also named to the NFL All-Rookie Team. In 2007, Ryans was named a second-team All-Pro linebacker and was selected to the Pro Bowl in 2007 and 2009.

On March 30, 2010, Ryans signed a six-year extension worth $48 million, including $21.75 million guaranteed.

=== Philadelphia Eagles ===
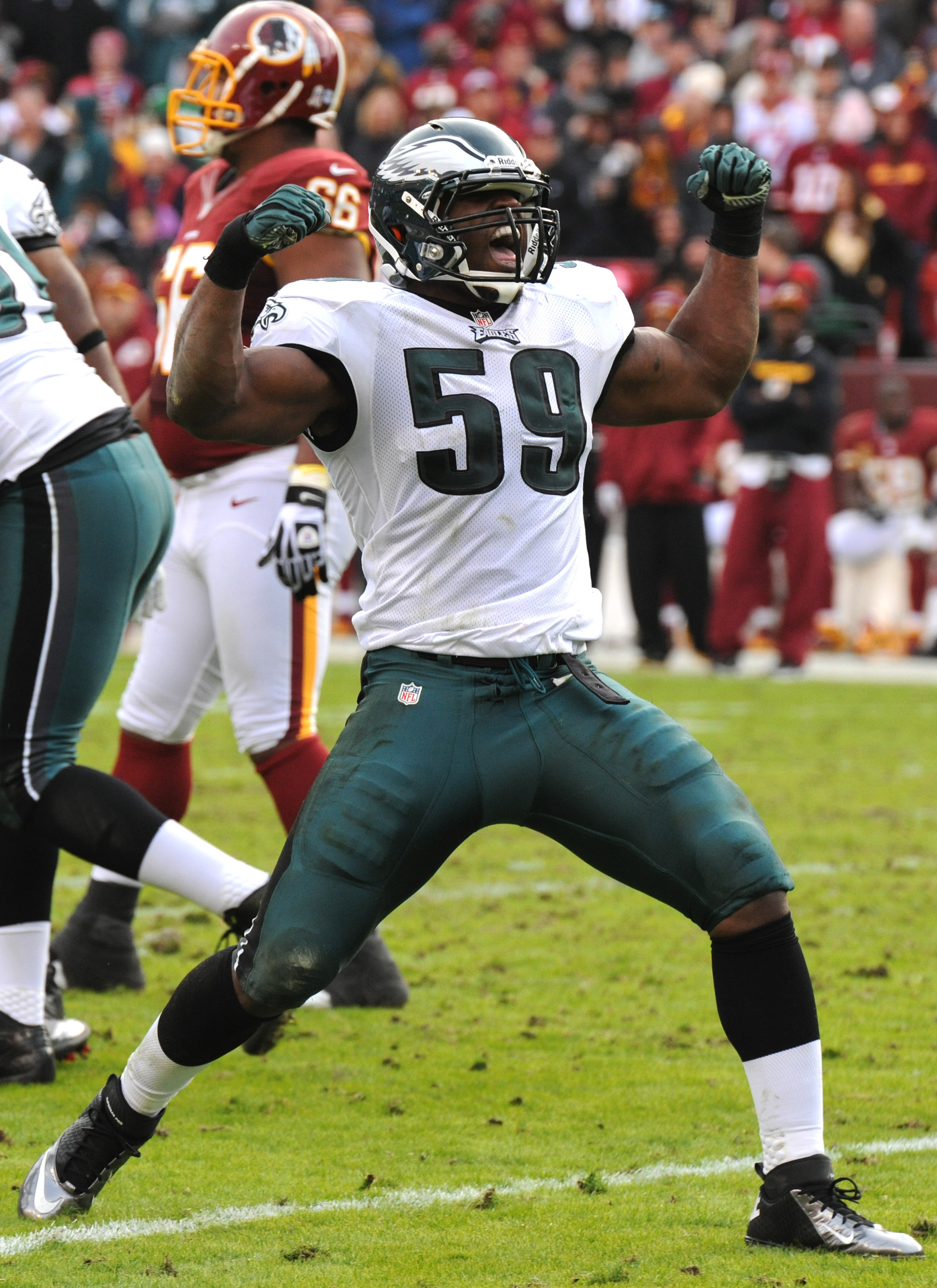
Ryans in 2012

On March 20, 2012, Ryans was traded to the Philadelphia Eagles in exchange for a 2012 fourth-round draft pick (used on Ben Jones) and a swap of third-round picks between the two teams (used on Brandon Brooks and Nick Foles). Ryans was immediately inserted as the team's starting middle linebacker. Although the Eagles were 4–12, Ryans still made plays, leading the team in tackles with 113 while adding a sack and interception.

In 2013, Ryans improved even further, leading the team in tackles once more with 127, while also recording career highs in sacks (4.0), interceptions (2), and interception return yardage (46). During the Wild Card Round against the New Orleans Saints, he had 10 tackles and his first postseason interception in the narrow 26–24 loss.

On November 3, 2014, Ryans was placed on injured reserve after tearing his Achilles.

Ryans was released on February 24, 2016.

== NFL career statistics ==
Legend
| | Led the league |
| **Bold** | Career high |

=== Regular season ===
| Year | Team | Games | | Tackles | | | | Interceptions | | | | | | Fumbles | | | |
| Year | Team | GP | GS | Cmb | Solo | Ast | Sck | PD | Int | Yds | Avg | Lng | TD | FF | FR | Yds | TD |
|---|---|---|---|---|---|---|---|---|---|---|---|---|---|---|---|---|---|
| 2006 | HOU | 16 | 16 | **156** | **126** | **30** | 3.5 | 5 | 1 | 16 | 16.0 | 16 | 0 | 1 | 1 | 0 | 0 |
| 2007 | HOU | 16 | 16 | 128 | 99 | 29 | 2.0 | **7** | 1 | 1 | 1.0 | 1 | 0 | 1 | **3** | 26 | **1** |
| 2008 | HOU | 16 | 16 | 112 | 86 | 26 | 1.0 | 4 | 0 | 0 | 0.0 | 0 | 0 | **2** | **3** | **47** | 0 |
| 2009 | HOU | 16 | 16 | 123 | 93 | **30** | 1.0 | 2 | 0 | 0 | 0.0 | 0 | 0 | 1 | 1 | 29 | 0 |
| 2010 | HOU | 6 | 6 | 54 | 32 | 22 | 1.0 | 2 | 0 | 0 | 0.0 | 0 | 0 | 0 | 0 | 0 | 0 |
| 2011 | HOU | 16 | 16 | 64 | 44 | 20 | 0.0 | 4 | 0 | 0 | 0.0 | 0 | 0 | 1 | 0 | 0 | 0 |
| 2012 | PHI | 16 | 16 | 113 | 86 | 27 | 1.0 | 4 | 1 | 0 | 0.0 | 0 | 0 | 0 | 0 | 0 | 0 |
| 2013 | PHI | 16 | 16 | 127 | 102 | 25 | **4.0** | **7** | **2** | **46** | **23.0** | **36** | 0 | 0 | 0 | 0 | 0 |
| 2014 | PHI | 8 | 8 | 45 | 36 | 9 | 0.0 | 4 | 1 | 0 | 0.0 | 0 | 0 | 0 | 1 | 0 | 0 |
| 2015 | PHI | 14 | 13 | 49 | 32 | 17 | 0.0 | 5 | 1 | 0 | 0.0 | 0 | 0 | 1 | 1 | 0 | 0 |
| Career | | 140 | 139 | 970 | 735 | 235 | 13.5 | 41 | 7 | 63 | 9.0 | 36 | 0 | 7 | 10 | 102 | 1 |

=== Postseason ===
| Year | Team | Games | | Tackles | | | | Interceptions | | | | | | Fumbles | | | |
| Year | Team | GP | GS | Cmb | Solo | Ast | Sck | PD | Int | Yds | Avg | Lng | TD | FF | FR | Yds | TD |
|---|---|---|---|---|---|---|---|---|---|---|---|---|---|---|---|---|---|
| 2011 | HOU | 2 | 1 | **11** | 4 | **7** | 0.0 | 0 | 0 | 0 | 0.0 | 0 | 0 | 0 | 0 | 0 | 0 |
| 2013 | PHI | 1 | 1 | 10 | **8** | 2 | 0.0 | **1** | **1** | **23** | **23.0** | **23** | 0 | 0 | 0 | 0 | 0 |
| Career | | 3 | 2 | 21 | 12 | 9 | 0.0 | 1 | 1 | 23 | 23.0 | 23 | 0 | 0 | 0 | 0 | 0 |

== Coaching career ==
=== San Francisco 49ers ===
On February 28, 2017, Ryans was hired by the San Francisco 49ers as a defensive quality control coach. He was promoted to inside linebackers coach the following season.

On January 18, 2021, Ryans was promoted to defensive coordinator following the departure of Robert Saleh, who left to become the head coach of the New York Jets four days prior. Following a successful postseason for the 49ers' defense, Ryans was interviewed for the head coaching vacancy at the Minnesota Vikings, but declined a second interview and opted to stay with the 49ers.

In 2022, Ryans' unit finished as the top defense in football by DVOA, second by weighted DVOA, fifth against the pass, and second against the rush. As a result, Ryans was named NFL Assistant Coach of the Year and PFWA Assistant Coach of the Year.

=== Houston Texans ===
==== 2023 season ====
On January 31, 2023, Ryans was hired as head coach of the Houston Texans, the same franchise he started his professional NFL career for, on a six-year deal. Ryans was the third head coach hired in the last three offseasons by the Texans.

The Texans started the 2023 season by losing their first two games. However, under Ryans' leadership, the team finished atop the AFC South with a 10–7 record and made the playoffs. The Texans defeated the Cleveland Browns by a score of a 45–14 in the Wild Card Round, which marked their first playoff win since 2019, and just the franchise's third playoff victory since 2013. The Texans saw their season end with a 34–10 road loss to the Baltimore Ravens in the Divisional Round.

==== 2024 season ====
In 2024, Ryans was one of three Pro Bowl linebackers to be a head coach. Antonio Pierce was hired to be the head coach of the Las Vegas Raiders and the New England Patriots followed suit by hiring Jerod Mayo.

After a victory over the Titans in the regular-season finale, Ryans became the fastest coach in franchise history to win 20 games (in 34 total games). He led the Texans to another 10–7 season and division title. They defeated the Los Angeles Chargers 32–12 in the Wild Card Round before losing on the road to the Kansas City Chiefs 23–14 in the Divisional Round.

==== 2025 season ====
In 2025, the Texans lost their first three games of the season, losing those games by a combined 13 points. They later entered the halfway point of the season at 3–5 following a loss to the Denver Broncos, which saw C. J. Stroud leave the game with a concussion.

During Week 10 against the Jacksonville Jaguars, the Texans were down 29–10 in the fourth quarter, but both Davis Mills and the defense hit a hot streak, and eventually won the game 36–29. The Texans thereafter would not lose a game for the rest of the regular season, finishing with a 12–5 record, which was an improvement from the previous two seasons and Ryans' best regular-season to date with the Texans. However, the Jaguars also did not lose a game following their fourth-quarter collapse against Houston, finishing with a 13–4 record. As a result, the Texans became a Wild Card team for the first time in franchise history as the #5-seed. During the Wild Card Round, they defeated the Pittsburgh Steelers 30–6 on the road, marking the first postseason road victory in franchise history. The Texans' season ended with a 28–16 road loss to the eventual AFC champion Patriots in the Divisional Round.

== Head coaching record ==
| Team | Year | Regular season | | | | | Postseason | | | |
| Team | Year | Won | Lost | Ties | Win % | Finish | Won | Lost | Win % | Result |
|---|---|---|---|---|---|---|---|---|---|---|
| HOU | 2023 | 10 | 7 | 0 | .588 | 1st in AFC South | 1 | 1 | .500 | Lost to Baltimore Ravens in AFC Divisional Game |
| HOU | 2024 | 10 | 7 | 0 | .588 | 1st in AFC South | 1 | 1 | .500 | Lost to Kansas City Chiefs in AFC Divisional Game |
| HOU | 2025 | 12 | 5 | 0 | .706 | 2nd in AFC South | 1 | 1 | .500 | Lost to New England Patriots in AFC Divisional Game |
| HOU | 2026 | 4 | 6 | 0 | .400 | TBD in AFC South | 0 | 0 | – | |
| Total | | 36 | 25 | 0 | .590 | | 3 | 3 | .500 | |

== Records ==
=== Houston Texans ===
- Most playoff wins: 3
- Most road playoff wins: 1

== Personal life ==
Ryans and his wife, Jamila, have four children: MJ, Micah, Xia, and Zuri. Ryans is a Christian and attends Fifth Ward Church of Christ in Houston, where he serves as a deacon.
