= Matt Leinart =

American football player (born 1983)

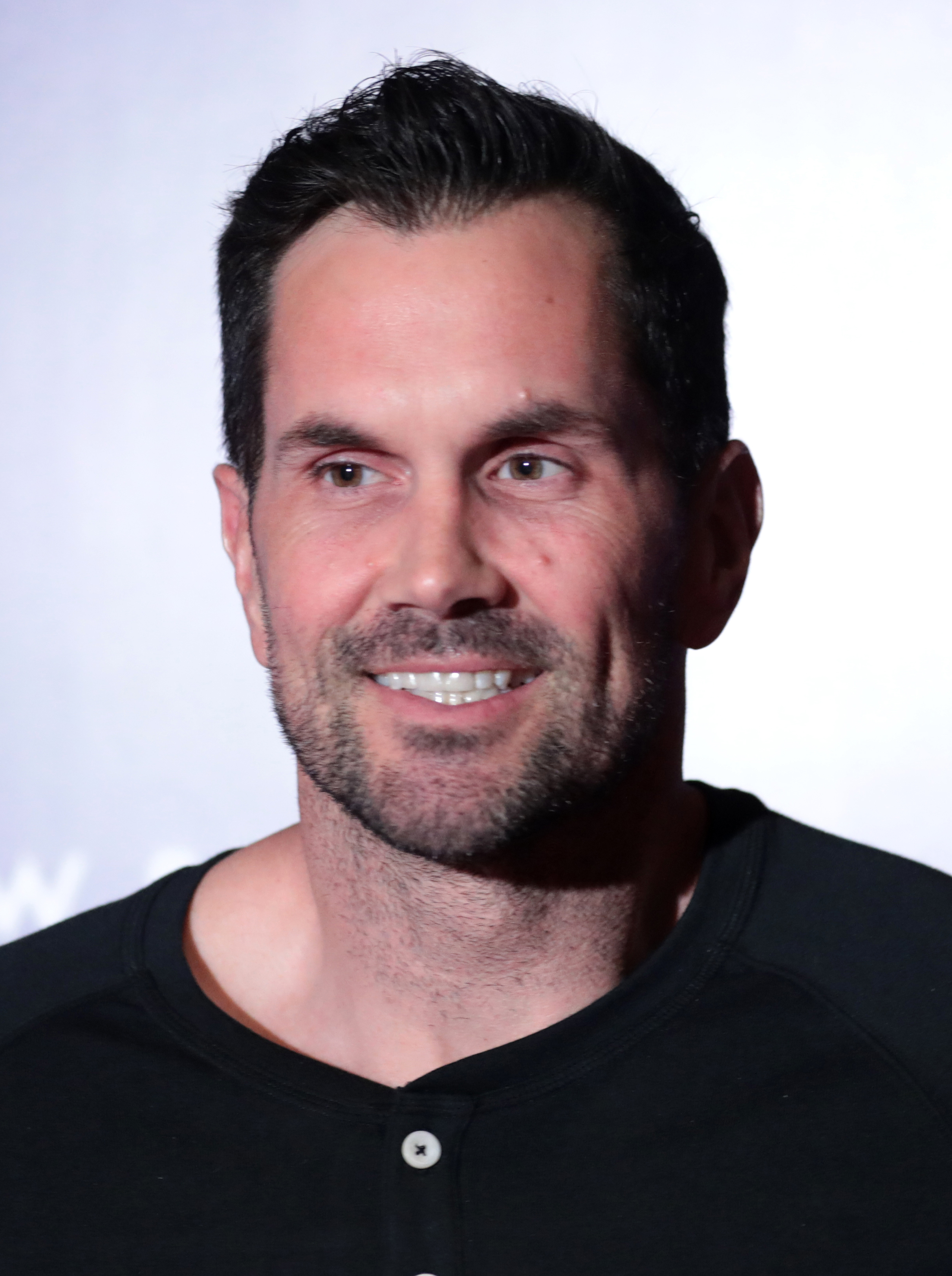
- Leinart in 2023

No. 7, 11
- Position: Quarterback

Personal information
- Born: May 11, 1983 (age 43); Santa Ana, California, U.S.
- Listed height: 6 ft 5 in (1.96 m)
- Listed weight: 227 lb (103 kg)

Career information
- High school: Mater Dei (Santa Ana)
- College: USC (2001–2005)
- NFL draft: 2006: 1st round, 10th overall pick

Career history
- Arizona Cardinals (2006–2009); Houston Texans (2010–2011); Oakland Raiders (2012); Buffalo Bills (2013)*
- * Offseason or practice squad member only

Awards and highlights
- BCS national champion (2004) (Note: The championship was later vacated by the BCS on June 6, 2011, following the imposition of sanctions by the NCAA, including vacation of games during the 2004 season); 2× AP national champion (2003, 2004); Heisman Trophy (2004); Consensus All-American (2004); First-team All-American (2005); SN Athlete of the Year (2005); USC Trojans No. 11 retired

Career NFL statistics
- Passing attempts: 641
- Passing completions: 366
- Completion percentage: 57.1%
- TD–INT: 15–21
- Passing yards: 4,065
- Passer rating: 70.2
- Rushing yards: 89
- Rushing touchdowns: 2
- Stats at Pro Football Reference
- College Football Hall of Fame

Matthew Stephen Leinart (born May 11, 1983) is an American former professional football player who was a quarterback in the National Football League (NFL) for seven seasons. He played college football for the USC Trojans, winning the Heisman Trophy and leading the team to a perfect season in 2004. Selected 10th overall by the Arizona Cardinals in the 2006 NFL draft, Leinart primarily served as Kurt Warner's backup for four seasons. He spent his final three seasons in a backup role for the Houston Texans and the Oakland Raiders. Leinart was inducted into the College Football Hall of Fame in 2017.

== Early life ==
Leinart was born in Santa Ana, California, with strabismus (commonly known as "crossed eyes"); his left eye was not aligned correctly with his right. He underwent surgery when he was three years old and was fitted with special glasses to correct the problem, but the eyewear, combined with Leinart's already-overweight frame, made him a target for other children's ridicule. "I used to get made fun of for being cross-eyed. It's just a terrible thing because kids are so cruel to the fat kid, to the kid with the glasses. So I turned to sports," he later said.

Leinart attended Mater Dei High School and was a letterman in football and basketball. As a junior, he led his team to a California Interscholastic Federation (CIF) Division I co-championship and was named the Serra League's Offensive Most Valuable Player. He was chosen as the Gatorade California high school football player of the year.

As one of the nation's top college football recruits, Leinart committed to USC under coach Paul Hackett, noting that a major factor was offensive coordinator Hue Jackson. However, after Hackett and most of his staff were fired in 2000, Leinart considered other programs such as Georgia Tech and Arizona State, and visited Oklahoma and Michigan before USC eventually hired Pete Carroll.

== College career ==
=== 2001–2003 seasons ===
Leinart attended the University of Southern California, where he played for coach Pete Carroll's USC Trojans football team from 2001 to 2005. He redshirted in 2001. As a freshman the next year, he understudied senior quarterback Carson Palmer, who went on to win the Heisman Trophy and was selected first overall by the Cincinnati Bengals in the 2003 NFL draft. Leinart appeared in only a few plays in 2002 but did not throw any passes. As a sophomore in 2003, Leinart competed with redshirt junior Matt Cassel, who was Palmer's backup the previous season, and Purdue transfer Brandon Hance for the vacant starting quarterback position. Going into the season, Carroll and his coaching staff selected Leinart, not because he had set himself significantly ahead of the pack in practice, but because they had to pick one of the three as the starting quarterback.

When the coaching staff told Leinart he would be the starter, he replied, "You're never going to regret this." There was some thought in the press that Leinart would merely hold the starting position until highly touted true freshman John David Booty, who had bypassed his senior year in high school to attend USC, could learn the offense.

Leinart's first career pass was a touchdown against Auburn in a 23–0 victory in the season opener. He won the first three games of his career before the then-#3 Trojans suffered a 34–31 triple-overtime defeat to California on September 27 that dropped the Trojans to #10. Leinart and the Trojans bounced back the next week against Arizona State. Leinart injured his knee in the second quarter and was not expected to play again that day, but he returned to the game and finished 13-of-23 for 289 yards in a 37–17 victory.

Leinart and the Trojans won their final eight games and finished the regular season 11–1 and ranked No. 1 in the AP and coaches' polls. However, USC was left out of the BCS championship game after finishing third in the BCS behind Oklahoma and LSU. The Trojans went to the Rose Bowl and played Michigan. Leinart was named the Rose Bowl MVP after he went 23-of-34 for 327 yards, throwing three touchdowns and catching a touchdown of his own from wide receiver Mike Williams. In 13 starts, Leinart was 255 for 402 for 3,556 yards, 38 touchdowns, and nine interceptions. He finished sixth in the Heisman voting. He was the Pac-10 Offensive Player of the Year.

In recognition of his Rose Bowl accomplishments, Leinart was inducted into the Rose Bowl Hall of Fame in 2019.

=== 2004 season ===
The Trojans started Leinart's junior season (2004) with victories in their first three games. On September 25, the Trojans played Stanford. After Stanford took a 28–17 halftime lead, Leinart sparked the offense with a 51-yard pass to Steve Smith and scored on a one-yard sneak to cut the Cardinal lead to four points. Leinart and the Trojans were able to take the lead on a LenDale White rushing touchdown and held on for the victory, 31–28. Leinart completed 24 of 30 passes. Leinart finished the final regular season game against UCLA, but was held without a touchdown pass for the first time in 25 starts. Nonetheless, Leinart was invited to New York for the Heisman ceremony, along with teammate Reggie Bush, Oklahoma's freshman running back sensation Adrian Peterson, quarterback and incumbent Heisman winner Jason White, and Utah's quarterback Alex Smith. In what many had considered one of the more competitive Heisman races, Leinart became the sixth USC player to claim the Heisman Trophy.

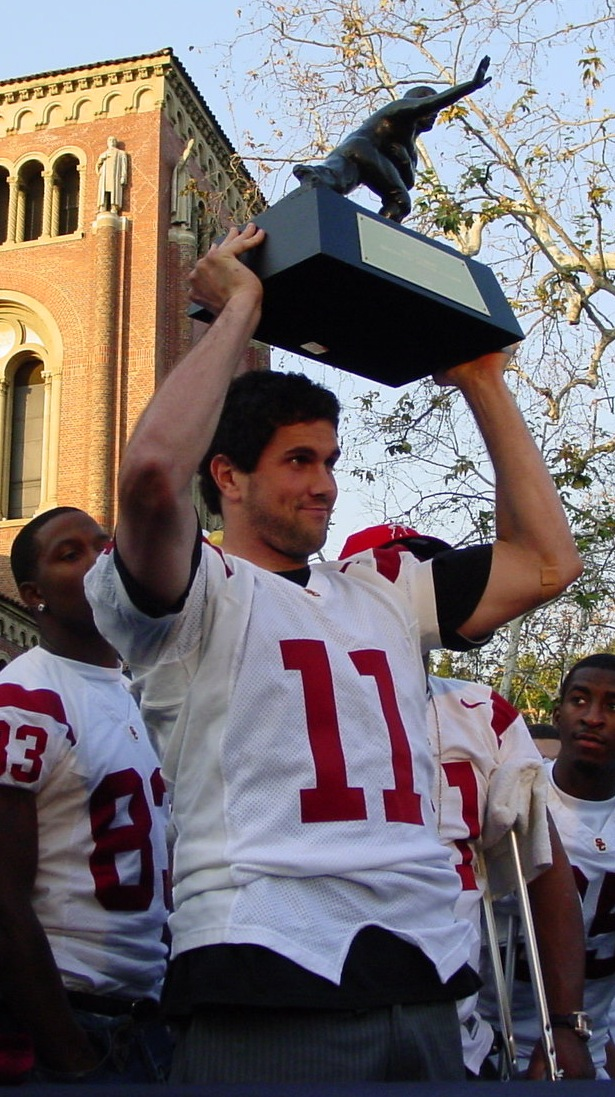
Leinart with his Heisman Trophy in 2005

In 2004, USC went wire-to-wire at No. 1 in the polls and earned a bid to the BCS title game at the Orange Bowl against Oklahoma, which was also 12–0. A dream matchup on paper (including White vs. Leinart, which was to be the first time two Heisman winners would play against each other), the Orange Bowl turned out to be a rout, as Leinart threw for five touchdown passes on 18-for-35 passing and 332 yards to lead the Trojans to a 55–19 victory. Leinart received Orange Bowl MVP honors and the Trojans claimed their first BCS National Championship and second straight No. 1 finish in the AP, extending their winning streak to 22 games. This victory and BCS championship were later vacated as a result of the Reggie Bush scandal (though the AP national championship still stands). He won Pac-10 Offensive Player of the Year for the second consecutive season but shared it with Reggie Bush.

=== 2005 season ===
Against Notre Dame, Leinart threw for a career-high 400 yards. After an incomplete pass and a sack led to a fourth-and-nine situation with 1:36 left—at the Trojans' own 26-yard line, Leinart called an audible "slant and go" route at the line of scrimmage and threw deep against the Irish's man-to-man coverage, where Dwayne Jarrett caught the ball and raced to the Irish' 13-yard line, a 61-yard gain. Leinart moved the ball to the goal line as time dwindled and scored on a quarterback sneak that gave the Trojans a 34–31 lead with three seconds to go, giving the Trojans their 28th straight victory and one of the most memorable and dramatic finishes in the history of the Notre Dame–USC rivalry.

The 2005 Trojans again had a perfect 12–0 regular season. Leinart was again invited to New York for the Heisman ceremony along with teammate Reggie Bush and Texas quarterback Vince Young. As a former Heisman winner, Leinart cast his first-place vote for Bush, and ended up third in the voting behind Bush and runner-up Young.

The Trojans advanced to the Rose Bowl to face Vince Young and #2 Texas in the BCS title game. The title game was considered another "dream matchup". Leinart completed 29 of 40 passes for a touchdown and 365 yards, but was overshadowed by Young, who piled up 467 yards of total offense and rushed for three touchdowns, including a score with 19 seconds remaining and two-point conversion to put the Longhorns ahead, 41–38. The Trojans lost for the first time in 35 games, and Leinart for just the second time in his 39 career starts. After graduation, Leinart's #11 jersey was retired at USC.

Leinart finished his college career with 807 completions on 1,245 attempts (64.8% completion percentage) for 10,693 yards, 99 touchdowns, and 23 interceptions. At the time of his departure, he was USC's all-time leader in career touchdown passes and completion percentage, and was second at USC behind Carson Palmer in completions and yardage. He averaged nearly 8.6 yards per attempt, and averaged only one interception every 54 attempts. He was 37–2 as a starter.

== Professional career ==
=== Pre-draft ===
Projected to be the first overall pick of the 2005 NFL draft, Leinart's draft stock decreased after he chose to return to USC for his senior season. Nonetheless, he remained one of the top prospects in the 2006 NFL draft. Scouts considered Leinart to be the archetypal NFL quarterback in size at 6 ft 5 in (1.96 m) and 225 pounds (102 kg), although his arm strength drew concerns.

Pre-draft measurables
Height	Weight	Arm length	Hand span	40-yard dash	Vertical jump	Broad jump	Wonderlic
6 ft 4 7/8 in (1.95 m)	223 lb (101 kg)	33 1/2 in (0.85 m)	10 1/8 in (0.26 m)	4.90 s	37 in (0.94 m)	9 ft 5 in (2.87 m)	35
All values from NFL Combine and Pro Day

=== Arizona Cardinals ===
==== 2006 season ====
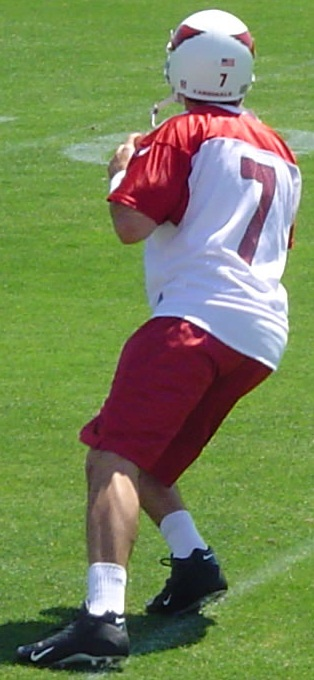
Leinart in minicamp as a rookie

Leinart was selected tenth overall in the first round of the 2006 NFL draft by the Arizona Cardinals. Leinart was the draft's second-highest selected quarterback after Vince Young, who defeated Leinart's team in the Rose Bowl.

Leinart spent four seasons with the Cardinals, primarily as a backup for veteran Kurt Warner.

In his first season, after a contentious negotiation making him the last member of the draft to sign a contract, Leinart agreed to a six-year, $51 million contract on August 14. Leinart played in the second quarter of the exhibition game against the New England Patriots on August 19.

Cardinals head coach Dennis Green held a press conference after a poor performance by Warner in Week 3 and announced Leinart would start. He made his debut in the fourth game of the season, throwing two touchdown passes.

In Week 6 against the 5–0 Chicago Bears, Leinart threw two touchdown passes in the first half, but the Bears came back in the second half to win 24–23.

In a November 26 game against the Minnesota Vikings, Leinart set a then-NFL rookie record with 405 passing yards, but only produced a quarterback rating of 74.0 as the team ultimately lost. He suffered a sprained left shoulder (throwing arm) in the Week 16 win over the San Francisco 49ers. In 11 starts, Leinart threw for 2,547 yards, 11 touchdowns, and 12 interceptions. He finished the season with a 4–7 record.

==== 2007–2010 seasons ====
Leinart opened the 2007 season on Monday Night Football against the San Francisco 49ers as the starting quarterback. After a sequence of drives, the offense stalled, which led new head coach Ken Whisenhunt to begin inserting Warner as a situational quarterback. On October 7, 2007, Leinart suffered a fractured left collarbone after being sacked by St. Louis Rams linebacker Will Witherspoon. Three days later, he was placed on injured reserve, ending his season. In his first two NFL seasons, Leinart had suffered two season-ending injuries, both due to being sacked. With Warner at the helm for the remainder of the season, the Cardinals mounted a late-season surge and won five of their final eight games.

In Leinart's second season with Arizona, he started five games, completed 53.6% of his passes (60/112), and threw for 647 yards, 5.8 yards per attempt, two touchdowns, and four interceptions. His passer rating was 61.9. He averaged 129 yards and 0.4 touchdowns per start. In the 2008 offseason, after he recovered from the injury, Leinart was handed his starting job back. Still, his hold on the job was tenuous after another strong training camp performance by Warner. Finally, after Leinart threw three interceptions within a matter of minutes versus the Oakland Raiders in the third preseason game, Warner was named the opening-day starter. Leinart picked up only a limited number of snaps in mop-up duty behind Warner. Warner started 16 games and took the Cardinals to their first ever Super Bowl, cementing his status as starter and Leinart's status as a backup. For the 2008 season, he completed 15 of 29 passing attempts (51.7%), one touchdown, one interception, and an 80.2 passer rating. In 2009, Leinart continued his role as back-up for Warner, who started all but one regular season game.

In 2010, Leinart was named the presumptive starter after Warner's retirement. However, due to poor play, the starting job in training camp was given to Derek Anderson. The Cardinals released Leinart on September 4, two days after the final preseason game, in favor of Anderson and rookies Max Hall and John Skelton.

=== Houston Texans ===
On September 6, 2010, the NFL announced that Leinart signed a one-year contract to back up Matt Schaub with the Houston Texans. Since Schaub played all 16 games, Leinart did not play during the 2010 season. During the 2011 offseason, despite speculation that he would sign with the Seattle Seahawks, who were coached by Leinart's college coach Pete Carroll, and compete for a starting position, Leinart ultimately agreed to return to Houston as a backup for the 2011 season. In Week 10, Schaub injured his right foot and the Texans named Leinart their starter. Leinart started for the first time in Week 12 against the Jacksonville Jaguars; however, during the first half he fractured his collarbone and was replaced by rookie quarterback T. J. Yates. At this point in his career, Leinart already suffered three season-ending injuries (2006, 2007, 2011) within his last eight starts.

On March 12, 2012, Leinart was released by the Texans.

=== Oakland Raiders ===
Leinart signed with the Oakland Raiders on May 1, 2012, as a backup to his former college teammate and fellow Heisman winner Carson Palmer. After Palmer suffered an injury in Week 16, Leinart and Terrelle Pryor split first-team reps. Pryor ended up getting the start in Week 17 and Leinart was not re-signed by the Raiders the following offseason.

=== Buffalo Bills ===
After injuries to quarterbacks EJ Manuel (knee surgery) and Kevin Kolb (concussion), the Bills decided to sign Leinart on August 25, 2013. Leinart and Thad Lewis (who was brought in on the same day through a trade) would compete for the fourth-string quarterback job behind undrafted rookie Jeff Tuel. Lewis won the competition, and Leinart was released by the team on August 30, 2013.

== Career statistics ==
Legend
**Bold**	Career high

=== NFL ===
Year	Team	Games			Passing								Rushing			
Year	Team	GP	GS	Record	Comp	Att	Pct	Yards	Avg	TD	Int	Rtg	Att	Yds	Avg	TD
2006	ARI	**12**	**11**	**4–7**	**214**	**377**	56.8	**2,547**	6.8	**11**	**12**	74.0	**22**	**49**	2.2	**2**
2007	ARI	5	5	3–2	60	112	53.6	647	5.8	2	4	61.9	11	42	**3.8**	0
2008	ARI	4	0	–	15	29	51.7	264	**9.1**	1	1	80.2	4	5	1.3	0
2009	ARI	8	1	0–1	51	77	66.2	435	5.6	0	3	64.6	9	−6	−0.7	0
2010	HOU	0	0	–	DNP											
2011	HOU	2	1	1–0	10	13	**76.9**	57	4.4	1	0	**110.1**	1	−1	−1.0	0
2012	OAK	2	0	–	16	33	48.5	115	3.5	0	1	44.4	0	0	0.0	0
Total		33	18	8–10	366	641	57.1	4,065	6.3	15	21	70.2	47	89	1.9	2

=== College ===
Legend
	Heisman Trophy
	Won the CFP National Championship
**Bold**	Career high

Season	Team	Games			Passing								Rushing			
Season	Team	GP	GS	Record	Cmp	Att	Pct	Yds	Y/A	TD	Int	Rtg	Att	Yds	Avg	TD
2001	USC	(redshirt) Redshirted														
2002	USC	3	0	—	0	0	0.0	0	0.0	0	0	0.0	0	0	0.0	0
2003	USC	**13**	**13**	12–1	255	402	63.4	3,556	8.8	**38**	**9**	**164.5**	32	−62	−1.9	0
2004	USC	**13**	**13**	**13–0**	269	412	65.3	3,322	8.1	33	6	156.5	49	−44	−0.9	3
2005	USC	**13**	**13**	12–1	**283**	**431**	**65.7**	**3,815**	**8.9**	28	8	157.7	**51**	**36**	**0.7**	**6**
Total		42	39	37–2	807	1,245	64.8	10,693	8.6	99	23	159.5	132	−70	−0.5	9

== Awards and honors ==
2004

- Heisman Trophy Winner
- Rose Bowl MVP
- Walter Camp Award
- AP Player of the Year
- Manning Award
- Touchdown Club QB of the Year
- Victor Award (Player of the Year)
- James E. Sullivan Award Finalist
- Newport college player of the year
- AP All-American first-team
- Football Coaches All-American first-team
- ESPN, CSTV, Rivals.com, SI.com, and CFBNews first-team All-American
- Pac-10 Co-offensive player of the year
- ESPN.com player of the year
- Rivals.com player of the year
- Pre-season All-American

2005

- Orange Bowl MVP
- Unitas Award
- Finalist for Heisman Trophy
- All-American Offensive Player
- LA Sports Sportsman of the Year
- The Sporting News Athlete of the Year

== Personal life ==
Leinart's mother was Linda (née Primak) and his father is Bob Leinart.

Leinart has a son, Cole, with Brynn Cameron, a former USC women's basketball player. The couple split before their son's birth in October 2006. Cole Leinart, a quarterback in high school, signed as a member of SMU's 2026 recruiting class in December 2025.

In May 2018, Leinart married Make It or Break It and The Mentalist actress Josie Loren at the Basilica of St. Lawrence in Asheville, North Carolina. In January 2020, Loren gave birth to Leinart's second son. In May 2021, Loren had Leinart's third son. Loren had their first daughter who was born in February 2025.

As of January 2023, Leinart is an analyst on Big Noon Kickoff for Fox Sports 1.

Leinart also co-hosts the Throwbacks podcast with Jerry Ferrara.

== See also ==
- List of Division I FBS passing yardage leaders
