= 2005 Texas vs. Ohio State football game =

First football game between Texas and Ohio State
Texas Longhorns	Ohio State Buckeyes
(1–0)	(1–0)
Big 12	Big Ten
25	22
Head coach: Mack Brown	Head coach: Jim Tressel
AP / Coaches; 2 / 2	AP / Coaches; 4 / 7
	1	2	3	4	Total
Texas	10	3	3	9	25
Ohio State	0	16	6	0	22
- Date: September 10, 2005
- Season: 2005
- Stadium: Ohio Stadium
- Location: Columbus, Ohio
- Referee: Randy Christal

The 2005 Texas vs. Ohio State football game, played September 10, 2005, was the first-ever meeting between The University of Texas at Austin and Ohio State University in a college football game. The two teams came into the game ranked No. 2 and No. 4, respectively. It was the second game of the 2005 season for both teams. Schools had become increasingly conservative in scheduling non-conference opponents of a high caliber, so a meeting of two top-five teams in the country was unusual this early in the season. For either team, winning the game would boost their chances of ultimately playing in the BCS National Championship Game while the loser likely faced the end of their national championship hopes.

According to observers such as USA Today, the game between the Texas Longhorns and Ohio State Buckeyes was one of the most-anticipated games of the 2005 season. Due to the high level of anticipation, ESPN chose the game for the location of its weekly College GameDay broadcast. ABC Sports’s pregame crew was also on site for the game.

The 2005 Texas Longhorns football team (variously "Texas" or "UT" or the "Horns") was coached by head football coach Mack Brown and led on the field by quarterback Vince Young. The 2005 Ohio State Buckeyes football team (variously "The Ohio State" or "OSU" or the "Bucks") was coached by Jim Tressel. Justin Zwick and Troy Smith shared time as quarterback due to disciplinary measures enforced against Smith. The game was a back-and-forth affair which was ultimately won by Texas, 25–22. The game's attendance was 105,565, which set the then all-time attendance record for Ohio Stadium. The game was televised nationally on ABC and drew 9.9 million viewers.

ESPN and College Football Rivals, were among the observers who named the game one of the best football games of the season. Texas' win kept them near the front of the national championship picture. They ultimately finished the season unbeaten, snaring the Big 12 Conference and NCAA championships. Ohio State finished the season with ten wins and two losses and ranked No. 4 in the nation.

== Leading into the 2005 season ==
The Ohio State Buckeyes and Texas Longhorns are two of the most storied programs in college football. Before 2005 each school had participated in college football for more than 100 years. They are home to nationally known traditions from the Buckeye leaf stickers and the O-H-I-O chant at Ohio State to Bevo and the Hook 'em Horns of Texas.

One of the three most victorious programs in college football history as judged by either number of wins or winning percentage, the University of Texas has traditionally been considered a college football powerhouse. From 1936 to 2004, the team finished the season in the top ten 23 times, or one-third of the time, according to the Associated Press. The team that coach Mack Brown fielded in 2005 has been called one of the most memorable in college football history by College Football News.

Like the Longhorns, the Buckeyes are an elite football program. The Buckeyes program has produced 164 first-team All-American players, including seven Heisman Trophy winners.

The 2005 UT team was attempting to follow on the success of the 2004 season, in which quarterback Vince Young led the team to Mack Brown's first Bowl Championship Series (BCS) game in the 2005 Rose Bowl and a top-5 finish in the polls. With the exception of Cedric Benson, Derrick Johnson, and Bo Scaife, Texas returned most of their key players from 2004–2005, including redshirt junior quarterback Vince Young.

Texas was given a pre-season No. 2 ranking (behind defending National Champions University of Southern California) by Sports Illustrated magazine and was also ranked second in the pre-season Associated Press Poll and USA Today Coaches Poll. This created anticipation that Texas might play for the national championship if they could win their road game against Ohio State University and if they could snap their five-game losing streak against the Oklahoma Sooners who started the season ranked at No. 7.

Ohio State had similarly high pre-season expectations with their No. 4 ranking. There was preseason speculation they might win the Big Ten Conference and possibly even to have a chance at the national championship. The team featured a "dynamic duo" of wide receivers in Ted Ginn Jr. and Santonio Holmes. Holmes entered his junior year as the No. 1 receiver for the Buckeyes after catching a pass in every game he played during the 2004 season; he finished the season with 769 yards and seven touchdowns on 55 catches. Ginn was known for his explosive plays and versatility. For instance in the 2004 game against the Michigan State Spartans, he scored three touchdowns (one rushing, one receiving, and one punt return).

For either team to play in the national title game, that team had to end up ranked No. 1 or No. 2 at the end of the regular season. Since the Bowl Championship Series was formed in 1998, 9 of the 14 teams were unbeaten going into the championship game. The only time the national champion has not been unbeaten during that stretch was in 2003 when LSU and USC claimed a share of the title as each finished with one loss. Ohio State tackle Kirk Barton would later say "There’ll probably be two undefeated teams at the end of the road and if you’re not one of them you’re probably not going to be playing for the championship. So you’ve got to treat every game like it's the Super Bowl. You only get one opportunity."

== Prior to the game ==
After they each won their home opener, Texas and Ohio State came into the game still ranked No. 2 and No. 4, respectively. According to observers such as USA Today, the match-up between the Longhorns and the OSU Buckeyes was one of the most-anticipated games of the 2005 season. Teams have become increasingly conservative in scheduling non-conference opponents of a high caliber, so a meeting of the number 2 and number 4 teams in the country is unusual this early in the season. Due to the high level of anticipation, ESPN chose the game for the location of its weekly College GameDay broadcast. ABC Sports’s pregame crew was also on site for the game.

This meeting was also the first-ever match-up between the two storied programs; the two teams had combined to play 1,594 games before meeting. For Texas, it also meant playing a second Big Ten Conference powerhouse soon after winning the first-ever matchup between Texas and the University of Michigan at the end of the 2004 season.

The Buckeyes entered the game with an all-time record of 766–298–53 including an Ohio Stadium mark of 356–101–20. During the 115 years the school has played football, the Buckeyes had won seven national championships, the most recent being in 2002 when they finished with a perfect 14–0 record. Texas came into the game with an all-time record of 788–310–33 since 1893. The Longhorns victory total and victory percentage are both the third highest in the NCAA annals. The Longhorns had won three national championships, most recently in 1970. OSU ranked sixth all-time winning percentage and was tied with Alabama for fifth in terms of total victories.

Before the game, it had been uncertain who would play at quarterback for Ohio State. Justin Zwick had started for OSU in the 2004 season, but three straight losses and an injury to Zwick gave Troy Smith a chance to start. However, an NCAA investigation found Smith took $500 from an Ohio State booster in violation of NCAA rules. Although he could have been dismissed from the team, ultimately he had to repay the money and was forced to sit out OSU's 2004 bowl game and the first game of 2005. Ohio State coach Jim Tressel announced ahead of time that both Zwick and Smith would play in the game.

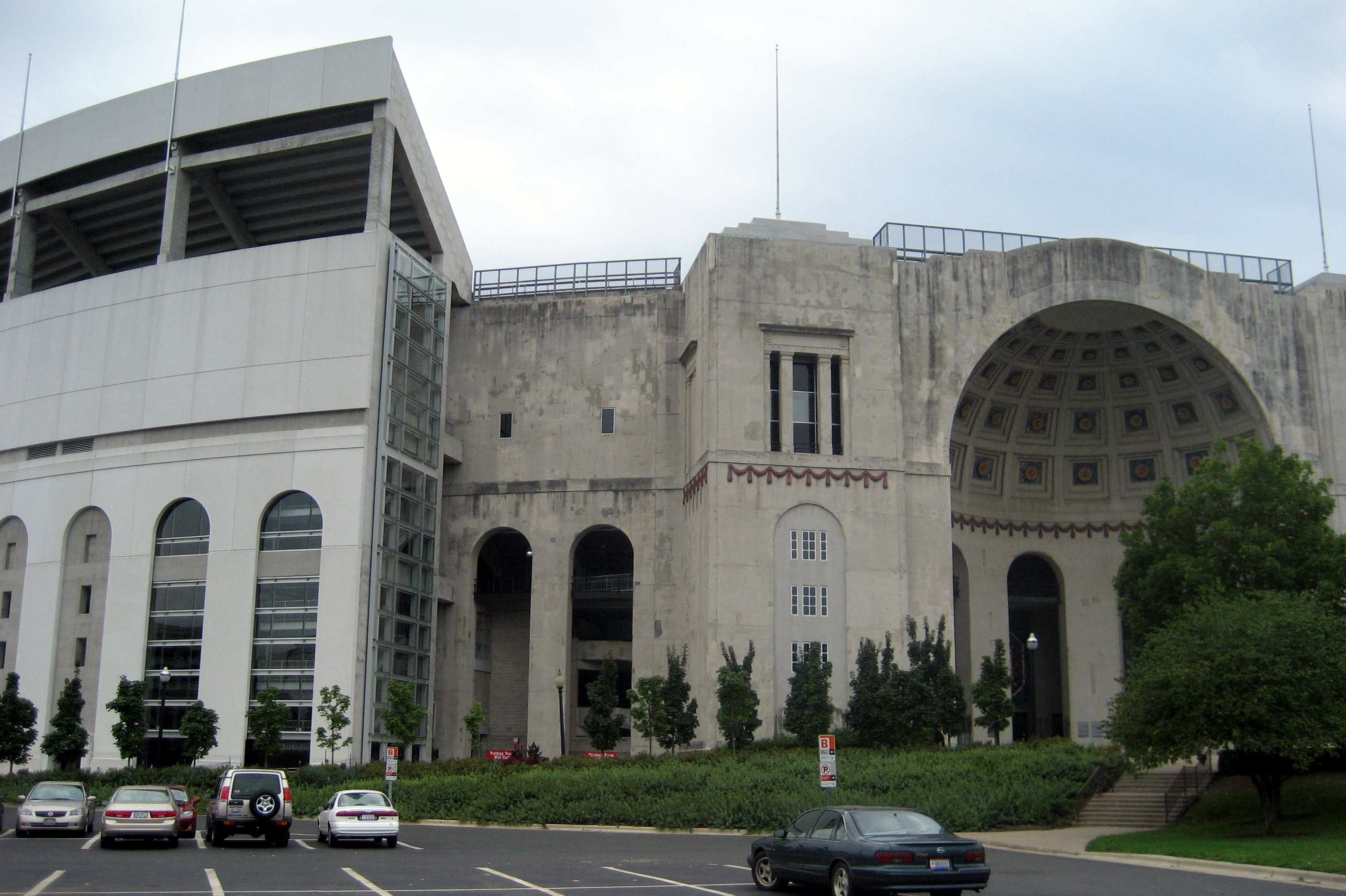
Ohio Stadium

The game was played at Ohio State University in Ohio Stadium, also known as "The Horseshoe" or "the Shoe". This stadium is notoriously tough for visiting teams, as its large capacity and structural design create a tremendous amount of crowd noise that can make it difficult for the visiting team to call audibles at the line of scrimmage. The Buckeyes had an active 36 consecutive game non-conference winning streak in the stadium. The game's attendance was 105,565, which set the all-time attendance record for Ohio Stadium. The game was televised nationally on ABC and drew 9.9 million viewers.

== First quarter ==
The Buckeyes got the ball to start the game and Justin Zwick was the starting quarterback. He led his team to advance only five yards in three plays so they punted from their own 46 yard-line to the UT eleven yard-line. Less than five minutes into the game, Texas scored first on a field goal by David Pino. The 42-yard kick was a career-long for Pino and also the first of what would be a career-high (single game) three field goals. Ohio State strung together 11 plays for 64 yards but had to punt. With 1:37 to play in the first quarter, Texas extended this lead to 10–0 with a five-yard touchdown pass from Vince Young to Billy Pittman. Troy Smith came into the game for the first time and was still leading the Buckeyes at the end of the first quarter.

== Second quarter ==
Ohio State controlled most of the second quarter. Their first score was a 45-yd field goal by Josh Huston followed by a 36-yard touchdown pass from Troy Smith to Santonio Holmes to tie the score at 10–10. They took the lead with two more field goals from Josh Huston; the first was from 36 yards and the second was from 25 yards. Following the kick-off, Texas took possession of the ball at their own 31 yard-line with only 31 seconds remaining in the first half. Young began the drive by throwing a 36-yard pass to the Ohio State 18 yard-line and then the receiver ran out of bounds to stop the clock with 20 seconds to play. On the next play, Young rushed for six yards and was tackled in-bounds, causing Texas to use a time out with 12 seconds on the clock. On second down, OSU's A. J. Hawk sacked Vince Young for a loss of 8 yards, forcing Texas to take another time-out with seven seconds remaining. Texas put in David Pino to complete a 37-yard kick with two seconds left, making the score 16–13 in favor of Ohio State. Texas kicked off and time expired on the ensuing 18-yard return by Erick Jackson.

== Halftime ==
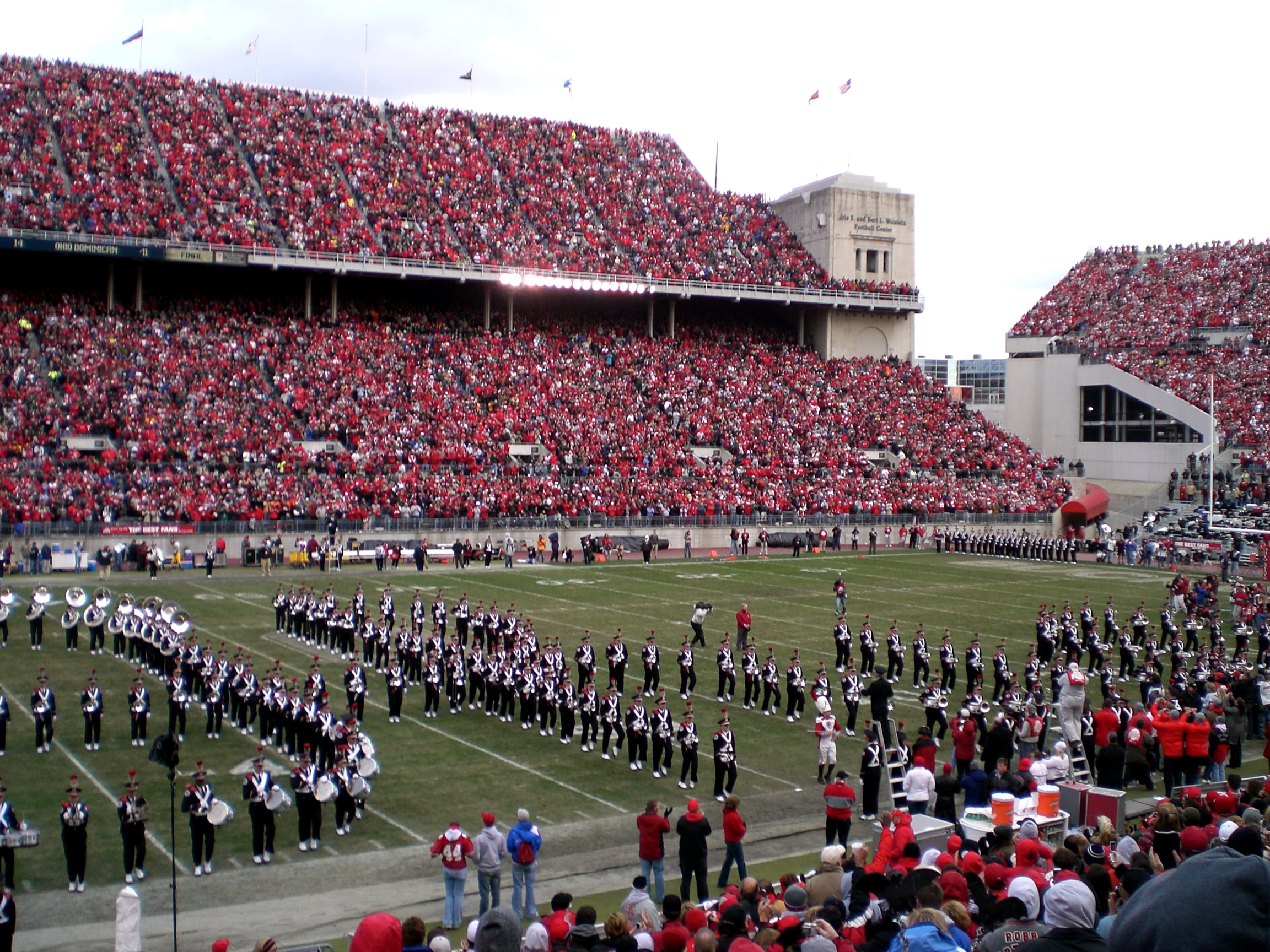
Script Ohio at Ohio Stadium

Just as it was the first-ever meeting of the two football teams, it was also the first time that The Ohio State University Marching Band (nicknamed "The Best Damn Band in the Land" or TBDBITL) and The University of Texas Longhorn Band (nicknamed "The Showband of the Southwest") had ever performed back-to-back halftime performances. The OSU band performed Script Ohio and the UT band performed Script Texas. Ohio State also held a ceremony to honor one of their longtime coaches, Woody Hayes, by placing his name on the east side of the stadium.

== Third quarter ==
Texas got the ball at their 20 to start the second half. On the first play from scrimmage, Jamaal Charles rushed for three yards. On second down, Vince Young's pass was intercepted by Nate Salley at the UT 37. Two rushes by Antonio Pittman resulted in a first down at the UT 30. After a short gain on first down and an incomplete pass on second down, Troy Smith recovered his own fumble on third down to set up a successful 44-yard field goal by Huston. Texas used six plays, including a 63-yard pass to Billy Pittman before being stopped at the Ohio State eight yard-line. David Pino made the 25-yard field goal. On the ensuing kick-off by Richmond McGee, OSU's Ted Ginn Jr. took the ball at the one yard-line and ran it out to almost mid-field. The drive ended with a successful 26-yard field goal by Huston. The following three possessions (two for Texas and one for Ohio State) resulted in punts. The third quarter expired with Ohio State leading 22 to 16 and with control of the ball near mid-field.

== Fourth quarter ==
Ohio State was unable to score and gave the ball back to Texas with 13:24 left in the game. Texas was forced to punt. On the Buckeyes' next possession they drove from their own 30 to the Texas 33 before settling for a sixth field goal attempt by Huston, this one from 50 yards out. Huston missed wide left to leave Ohio State still ahead by six points. Texas took over at their own 33 with 5:07 left in the game.

On an incomplete pass to Brian Carter, Texas benefited from a pass interference penalty which moved the ball to the UT 48. Vince Young rushed for four yards and then threw an incomplete pass to Ramonce Taylor before taking a timeout with 4:42 left to play. Young's next pass was complete for a first down to Jamaal Charles who went out-of-bounds to completely stop the clock. Vince Young rushed for one yard to the OSU 38 and then took a time-out at 3:53. Young threw to Jamaal Charles who gained eight yards and went out-of-bounds. An offsides penalty by Ohio State and a one-yard rush by Jamaal Charles gave Texas second and nine from the Ohio State 24. On second and nine with 2:37 remaining to play, Vince Young passed a touchdown pass over the head of a defender to find Limas Sweed in the end-zone. It was the 23rd touchdown pass by Young, putting him seventh in the all-time school record book. David Pino's kick gave Texas the lead at 23–22.

Texas kicked off to the Ohio State five yard-line and Holmes returned it 26 yards to the Buckeye 31. Justin Zwick was in at quarterback for Ohio State. On first-and-ten and needing a score to win the game, Zwick rushed around the left side to the 35 but a fumble was forced by UT's Drew Kelson. UT's Brian Robison recovered the fumble at the 30 and advanced it nine yards before being tackled by Vernon Gholston at the Ohio State 21.

With 2:19 to play and nursing a one-point lead, Texas was in position to win if they could run out the clock. They began with a 12-yard rush on the left side by Jamaal Charles for a first down. Charles then carried again up the middle for a two-yard gain to the Ohio State 7. OSU called a time-out to stop the clock at 1:36. On second-and-goal, Vince Young kept the ball and gained three yards before being tackled by A. J. Hawk. The Buckeyes again called time-out with 1:23 left. Young carried again for three yards before being brought down by B. Carpenter and A. J. Hawk just one yard short of the goal-line. This time, Texas took a time-out with 29 seconds left to play. Following the time-out, Young handed off to Henry Melton who was stopped for no gain. Ohio State took over on downs.

Troy Smith came back in as quarterback for Ohio State. On first down, Smith was sacked for a loss of one yard by Aaron Harris. This gave Texas a safety, extending their lead to 25–22. Josh Huston attempted an onside kick, but Texas was able to recover it at the Ohio State 32. Texas took a knee to end the game.

== Analysis ==
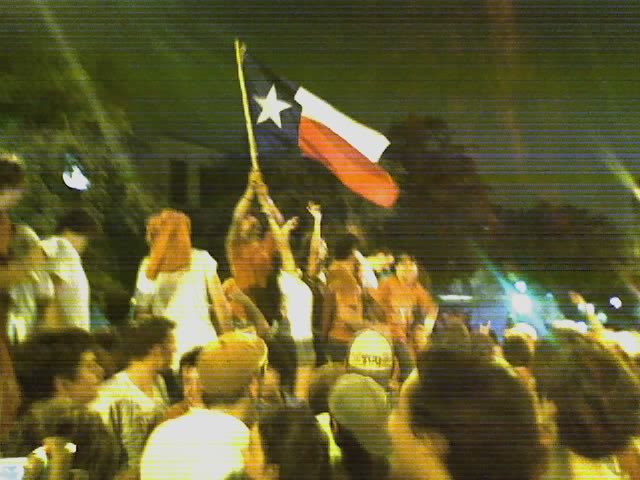
After the game, spontaneous celebrations occurred along Guadalupe Street a.k.a. "The Drag" which runs adjacent to the UT campus.

Ohio State recovered three turnovers in Texas territory, but each time the Texas defense held OSU to just a field goal. The five field goals by Josh Huston tied an Ohio State school and stadium record. He now shares the record with Mike Nugent (at North Carolina State, September 19, 2004) and Bob Atha (vs. Indiana, October 24, 1981, in Ohio Stadium). Wide receiver Ted Ginn Jr., usually an important contributor for the Buckeyes, was held to only nine yards receiving but he also contributed 82 yards on three kick-off returns (the longest was for 46 yards) and eight yards on one punt return.

Texas' win at 25–22 was the lowest scoring game the team would experience all season, both in terms of points scored by Texas and in terms of total points. UT's victory against fourth-ranked OSU marked the highest ranked non-conference opponent the Longhorns had ever beaten at the opponent's home stadium. The previous high came in 1983 when third-ranked Texas pulled off a 20–7 upset at fifth-ranked Auburn. Texas became the first non-conference opponent to beat The Buckeyes in Ohio Stadium since 1990, putting an end to a 36-game home victory string over non-conference opponents. The Longhorns also were the first team to ever beat the Buckeyes in a night game at The Horseshoe. It was UT's 10th straight victory in a night game road contest. ESPN and College Football Rivals, were among the observers who named the game one of the best football games of the season.

== After the game ==
Texas eventually finished the season of 2005–2006 as the only undefeated team, winning both the Big 12 Conference championship and the National Championship. The Longhorns' penultimate victory of the season, in the Big 12 Championship Game, featured the biggest margin of victory in the history of that contest. Their ultimate victory in the 2006 Rose Bowl against the University of Southern California Trojans for the national championship, as well as their overall season, have both been cited as standing among the greatest performances in college football history by publications such as College Football News, the Atlanta Journal-Constitution, Scout.com, and Sports Illustrated. The Longhorns and the Trojans were together awarded the 2006 ESPY Award by ESPN for the "Best Game" in any sport. The Longhorns finished the season as the only unbeaten team, with 13 wins and zero losses overall.

The season gave Texas its second Big 12 football championship (27 conference championships total, including 25 in the Southwest Conference), and fourth consensus national championship in football. It was the ninth perfect season in the history of Longhorn football.

UT set numerous school and NCAA records, including most points scored in a season (652). After the season ended, six Longhorns from this championship team were selected by professional football teams in the 2006 NFL draft.

Ohio State finished the season with an appearance in the 2006 Fiesta Bowl where they defeated the Notre Dame Fighting Irish 34–20. They finished the season ranked No. 4 in the nation.

The two teams met the next year in Texas, with Ohio State prevailing 24–7 in a rematch. In 2009, they met again in the Fiesta Bowl, with Texas scoring with 16 seconds left to win 24–21. This was the final matchup between the two teams until the 2025 Cotton Bowl Classic, which served as a semifinal game for the College Football Playoff (CFP). The Buckeyes sealed the game away by a Longhorns' fumble that was returned 83 yards in the other direction for a touchdown, with the final score being 28–14. Ohio State eventually went on to win the CFP National Championship following that game. The two teams were originally going to meet in another home and home series in 2022 and 2023, with the 2022 game occurring in Texas and the 2023 game occurring in Columbus. However, this has since been pushed back to 2025 and 2026, and Texas instead played a home and home series with Alabama during the 2022 and 2023 seasons. The 2025 game was played in Columbus, OH, and the 2026 game was played in Austin, TX. In the 2025 game, Ohio State defeated preseason-No. 1 Texas in a low-scoring game, 14–7, while Texas prevailed in the 2026 game 24-23.

== Notes and references ==
- "Official website of UT football – 2005 National Champions". Archived from the original on December 4, 2007.
- "2005 Bowl Championship Series Standings" (PDF). The National Football Foundation & College Hall of Fame, Inc. Archived from the original (PDF) on May 15, 2006.
- "Official website of OSU athletics". Archived from the original on April 7, 2007.
- "2005 Bowl Championship Series Standings" (PDF). The National Football Foundation & College Hall of Fame, Inc. Archived from the original (PDF) on May 15, 2006.
- "Client News". Harris Interactive. Archived from the original on July 15, 2006.
- "Final Dec. 4th Rankings from the Harris Interactive College Football Poll" (PDF). Harris Interactive. Archived from the original (PDF) on August 10, 2006.
- "2005 Preseason Consensus". Stassen.com. Archived from the original on July 16, 2006.
- "BCS Standings". BCSfootball.org. Archived from the original on June 29, 2006.
