= 2005 Texas Longhorns football team =

American college football season

2005 Texas Longhorns football

Consensus national champion Big 12 champion Big 12 South Division champion Rose Bowl champion

Big 12 Championship Game, W 70–3 vs. Colorado

Rose Bowl (BCS NCG), W 41–38 vs. USC
- Conference: Big 12 Conference
- South

Ranking
- Coaches: No. 1
- AP: No. 1
- Record: 13–0 (8–0 Big 12)
- Head coach: Mack Brown (8th season)
- Offensive coordinator: Greg Davis (8th season)
- Offensive scheme: Spread
- Co-defensive coordinators: Gene Chizik (1st season); Duane Akina (1st season)
- Base defense: 4–3
- Home stadium: Darrell K Royal–Texas Memorial Stadium

2005 Big 12 Conference football standings
	Conf.			Overall
Team	W		L	W		L
North Division
Colorado x	5	–	3	7	–	6
No. 24 Nebraska	4	–	4	8	–	4
Missouri	4	–	4	7	–	5
Iowa State	4	–	4	7	–	5
Kansas	3	–	5	7	–	5
Kansas State	2	–	6	5	–	6
South Division
No. 1 Texas x$#	8	–	0	13	–	0
No. 20 Texas Tech	6	–	2	9	–	3
No. 22 Oklahoma	6	–	2	8	–	4
Texas A&M	3	–	5	5	–	6
Baylor	2	–	6	5	–	6
Oklahoma State	1	–	7	4	–	7
Championship: Texas 70, Colorado 3
# – BCS National Champion; $ – BCS representative as conference champion; x – Division champion/co-champions; Rankings from AP Poll

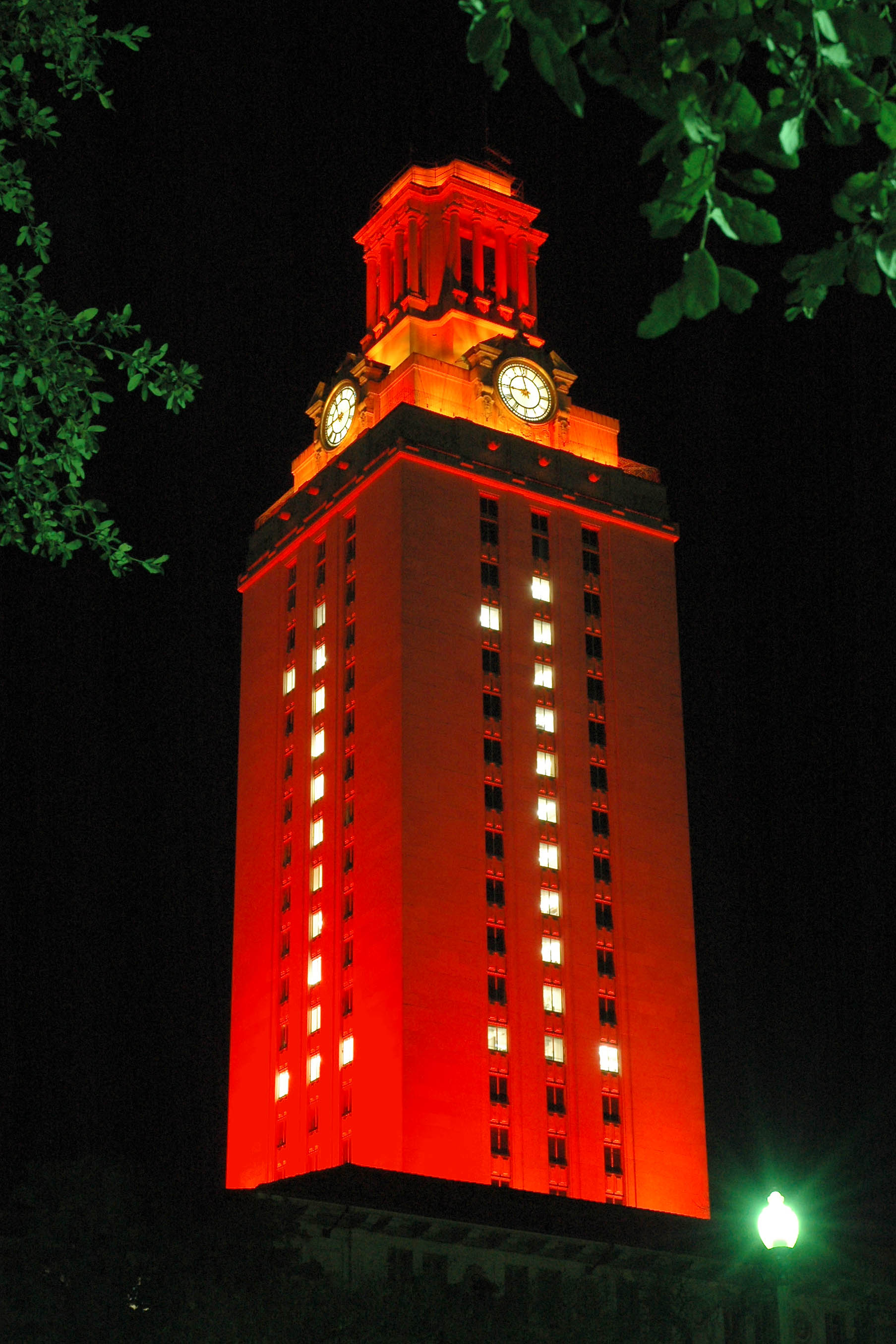
The UT Tower lit in a special configuration in honor of the 2005 National Championship football team.

The 2005 Texas Longhorns football team represented the University of Texas at Austin during the 2005 NCAA Division I-A football season, winning the Big 12 Conference championship and the national championship. The team was coached by Mack Brown, led on offense by quarterback Vince Young, and played its home games at Darrell K Royal–Texas Memorial Stadium.

The team's penultimate victory of the season, the Big 12 Championship Game, featured the biggest margin of victory in the history of that contest. They finished the season by winning the 2006 Rose Bowl against the USC Trojans for the national championship. Numerous publications have cited this victory as standing among the greatest performances in college football history, and ESPN awarded the 2006 ESPY Award for the "Best Game" in any sport to the Longhorns and the Trojans. The Longhorns finished as the only unbeaten team in NCAA Division I-A football that year, with thirteen wins and zero losses. Owing to its overwhelmingly dominant margins of victory, and its perfect record, this Longhorns team is often considered among the best in college football history.

Texas earned its second Big 12 Conference football championship to make 27 conference championships total, including 25 in the Southwest Conference. It was their fourth national championship in football and the ninth perfect season in the history of Longhorn football.

The team set numerous school and NCAA records, including their 652 points which set an NCAA record for points scored in a season. After the season ended, six Longhorns from this championship team joined professional football teams through the 2006 NFL draft. Seven more Longhorns followed suit in the 2007 NFL draft and they were joined by two free agents. Another nine followed through the 2008 draft and free-agency to make a total of twenty-four players who entered into the National Football League (NFL).

== Before the season ==
Media and fans of college football consider the UT program one of the great powerhouses of the game because of the school's winning record as well as their previous national championships in 1963, 1969 and 1970. From 1936 to 2004, the team finished the season in the top ten team of the Associated Press Poll 23 times, or one-third of the time. At the start of the 2005 season, the Longhorns were one of the most victorious programs in college football history; they were third in total victories and fourth if measured by winning percentage.

In the 2004 season Vince Young led the team to the 2005 Rose Bowl, the school's first Bowl Championship Series (BCS) game, and a top 5 finish in the major polls. It should also be noted that Vince Young predicted that the Longhorns would return to the Rose Bowl next season in a post game interview where he proclaimed, "We'll be back!" Young returned for the 2005–2006 season, as did most of the other key players from 2004 to 2005, with the exception of Cedric Benson, Derrick Johnson, and Bo Scaife. Texas was given a pre-season No. 2 ranking (behind the defending National Champions, the University of Southern California) by Sports Illustrated magazine, the Associated Press Poll and the USA Today Coaches Poll.

During the summer of 2005, a period free of official team practices, Young and his receivers spent extra practice time working on their timing and team-work. The fall Orange and White intra-team scrimmage was held on August 21, 2005, as an event open to the public. Running back Ramonce Taylor returned the opening kickoff 94 yards for a touchdown. Young completed five of seven passing attempts for 68 yards and one touchdown. Senior Richmond McGee made two 33-yard field goals and emerged as the top candidate to handle field goals, kickoffs and punts. Brown said of McGee, "We've never had one person do all three, so it's a concern, but right now, he would be the guy."

The success of the 2004 team and the efforts during the off-season fueled anticipation by sports writers that Texas would play for the national championship if they could win their away game against Ohio State University and end their five-game losing streak against Oklahoma. The BCS system required any team competing in the championship game to be ranked either number one or number two in the BCS Standings at the end of the season.

== Schedule ==
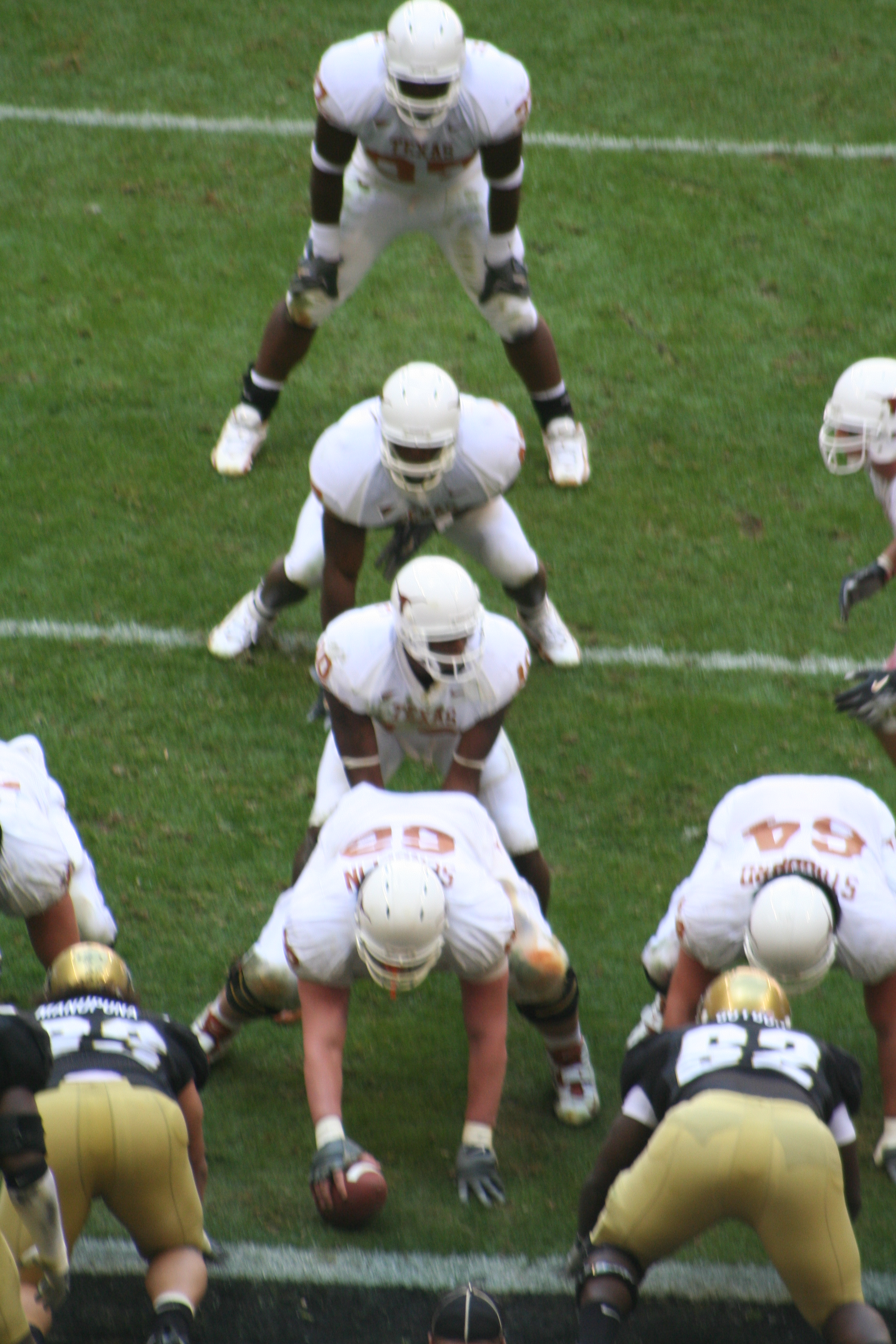
The Texas offense shown lined up in the I formation. The I formation is often used for short-yardage situations, the case here with Texas just outside Colorado's goal line. The 2005 UT team more commonly used the shotgun formation.

Date	Time	Opponent	Rank	Site	TV	Result	Attendance
September 3	6:00 p.m.	Louisiana–Lafayette*	No. 2	Darrell K Royal–Texas Memorial Stadium; Austin, TX	FSN	W 60–3	82,519
September 10	7:00 p.m.	at No. 4 Ohio State*	No. 2	Ohio Stadium; Columbus, OH (College GameDay)	ABC	W 25–22	105,565
September 17	6:00 p.m.	Rice*	No. 2	Darrell K Royal–Texas Memorial Stadium; Austin, TX (rivalry)	FSN	W 51–10	83,055
October 1	11:00 a.m.	at Missouri	No. 2	Faurot Field; Columbia, MO	ABC	W 51–20	57,231
October 8	12:00 p.m.	vs. Oklahoma	No. 2	Cotton Bowl; Dallas, TX (Red River Rivalry)	ABC	W 45–12	75,452
October 15	2:30 p.m.	No. 24 Colorado^{†}	No. 2	Darrell K Royal–Texas Memorial Stadium; Austin, TX	ABC	W 42–17	83,474
October 22	2:30 p.m.	No. 10 Texas Tech	No. 2	Darrell K Royal–Texas Memorial Stadium; Austin, TX (Battle for the Chancellor's Spurs) (College GameDay)	ABC	W 52–17	83,919
October 29	6:00 p.m.	at Oklahoma State	No. 2	Boone Pickens Stadium; Stillwater, OK	TBS	W 47–28	48,035
November 5	11:30 a.m.	at Baylor	No. 2	Floyd Casey Stadium; Waco, TX (rivalry)	FSN	W 62–0	44,783
November 12	2:30 p.m.	Kansas	No. 2	Darrell K Royal–Texas Memorial Stadium; Austin, TX	ABC	W 66–14	83,696
November 25	11:00 a.m.	at Texas A&M	No. 2	Kyle Field; College Station, TX (rivalry)	ABC	W 40–29	86,617
December 3	12:00 p.m.	vs. Colorado	No. 2	Reliant Stadium; Houston, TX (Big 12 Championship Game)	ABC	W 70–3	71,107
January 4, 2006	7:00 p.m.	vs. No. 1 USC*	No. 2	Rose Bowl; Pasadena, CA (Rose Bowl - BCS National Championship Game) (College GameDay)	ABC	W 41–38	93,986
*Non-conference game; ^{†}Homecoming; Rankings from AP Poll released prior to the game; All times are in Central time

== Roster ==
The final roster of the season:

2005 Texas Longhorns roster
Quarterbacks: 7 Matt Nordgren – Senior; 10 Vince Young – Junior; 12 Colt McCoy – Freshman; 13 Matthew McCoy* – Junior; 14 Freddy Torres* – Freshman; 16 Gilbert Zepeda* – Senior; 18 Will Buchanan* – Freshman; 22 Adair Fragoso* – Junior; Running backs: 3 Chris Ogbonnaya – Freshman; 11 Ramonce Taylor – Sophomore; 12 Derrick Quick* – Junior; 22 Selvin Young – Junior; 23 Jaime Carvajal* – Sophomore; 25 Jamaal Charles – Freshman; 26 Stephen Lane* – Freshman; 28 Antwaun Hobbs* – Junior; 29 Matthew Hofer* – Sophomore; 32 Marcus Myers – Junior; 37 Henry Melton – Freshman; 46 Ahmard Hall – Senior; 7 Andre Comfort – Senior	Wide receivers: 1 Tyrell Gatewood – Sophomore; 2 Brian Carter – Senior; 4 Limas Sweed – Sophomore; 5 Billy Pittman – Sophomore; 6 Quan Cosby – Freshman; 8 Jordan Shipley – Freshman; 9 Nate Jones – Sophomore; 17 Xang Chareunsab* – Senior; 23 Myron Hardy – Sophomore; 25 Mark McCoy* – Junior; 27 Clayton Tefteller* – Junior; 41 Matt Logan* – Senior; 82 Coy Aune* – Sophomore; 84 George Walker – Freshman; 85 Christoph Peters* – Junior; 89 Daniel Kendall* – Junior; Tight ends: 16 David Thomas – Senior; 83 Lucas Hampton – Freshman; 86 Kirby Portley* – Senior; 86 Peter Ullman – Freshman; 87 Neale Tweedie – Junior; 88 Mac McWhorter* – Freshman; Offensive guards: 51 Mike Garcia – Senior; 55 Cedric Dockery – Freshman; 64 Kasey Studdard – Junior; 71 Chris Hall – Freshman; 72 Will Allen – Senior	Offensive tackles: 63 Justin Blalock – Junior; 70 Greg Dolan – Freshman; 71 Brad Poronsky* – Senior; 73 Jonathan Scott – Senior; 78 William Winston – Senior; 79 Tony Hills – Sophomore; Centers: 52 Charlie Tanner – Freshman; 54 Michael Taylor* – Freshman; 62 Lyle Sendlein – Junior; 66 Brett Valdez – Junior; 67 Dallas Griffin – Sophomore; Defensive ends: 39 Brian Robison – Junior; 47 Steven Andrade* – Senior; 49 Eric Hall – Senior; 52 Cory Michner* – Freshman; 80 Tim Crowder – Junior; 93 Scott Hibbeler* – Senior; 95 Aaron Lewis – Freshman; 98 Brian Orakpo – Freshman; 99 Kaelen Jakes – Senior; Defensive tackles: 61 Jaicus Solis* – Junior; 76 Thomas Marshall – Sophomore; 90 Rodrique Wright – Senior; 91 Tully Janszen – Junior; 92 Larry Dibbles – Senior; 94 Marco Martin – Junior; 97 Frank Okam – Sophomore; Defensive linemen (unspecified): 75 Roy Miller – Freshman	Linebackers: 2 Aaron Harris – Senior; 4 Drew Kelson – Sophomore; 21 Eric Foreman – Sophomore; 30 Braden Johnson – Senior; 33 Scott Derry – Sophomore; 35 David Yi* – Sophomore; 38 Roddrick Muckelroy – Freshman; 40 Robert Killebrew – Sophomore; 43 Jeremy Campbell – Freshman; 44 Rashad Bobino – Freshman; 46 Julian Peterman* – Freshman; 48 Roberto Schuldes* – Freshman; 50 Luke Tiemann* – Sophomore; 57 Jason Perez* – Senior; Cornerbacks: 5 Tarell Brown – Junior; 8 Cedric Griffin – Senior; 13 Erick Jackson – Sophomore; 28 Brandon Foster – Sophomore; 31 Aaron Ross – Junior; Safeties: 7 Michael Huff – Senior; 10 Ishie Oduegwu – Freshman; 18 Matt Melton – Junior; 21 Michael Flath* – Sophomore; 26 Marcus Griffin – Sophomore; 27 Michael Griffin – Junior	Defensive backs (unspecified): 3 Karim Meijer – Senior; 24 Ryan Moench* – Freshman; 29 Ryan Palmer – Freshman; 36 James Ray* – Senior; 42 Cody Stavig* – Senior; 45 Jerren Wright* – Senior; Kickers: 15 David Pino – Senior; 39 Ryan Bailey* – Freshman; 35 Richmond McGee – Senior; 97 Greg Johnson – Junior; Punters: 17 Trevor Gerland – Freshman; 43 Justin Moore* – Freshman; Long snappers: 53 Nick Schroeder – Senior; 58 William Harvey* – Freshman; Terms: Freshman = a first year player; Sophomore = a second year player; Junior = a player in his third year; Senior = a player in his fourth year; A player can sit out a year, in which case he has a redshirt.; An * indicates that the player is a "walk-on" (a non-scholarship player).

Texas had very few problems affecting the roster. Only one defensive starter missed a game due to injury. On offense, starting running back Selvin Young injured his ankle in the game against Louisiana-Lafayette and re-injured it the following week against Ohio State. He did not play in the games against Rice or Baylor. Receiver Jordan Shipley missed the entire season due to a pulled hamstring.

The Austin Police Department charged UT receiver Myron Hardy with a Class A misdemeanor for carrying a prohibited weapon, a "'butterfly style knife' that operates like a switchblade, making it a prohibited weapon." Hardy appeared in four games for the 2004 team, catching one pass for four yards. He redshirted in 2005 and returned to the roster for 2006.

The police investigated assault allegations against Cedric Griffin and Ramonce Taylor but no charges were filed. The incident allegedly occurred December 10, 2005, near the Sixth Street entertainment district. The UT athletics department found no reason to discipline the players and they both played in the final game of the season. Also in December, the police announced they were investigating a Longhorn player in a separate incident that occurred in September. This incident allegedly involved armed robbery with a handgun. The police did not name the target of the investigation.

Three Longhorns, freshman running backs Michael Houston and Jerrell Wilkerson and sophomore defensive back Bobby Tatum, elected to transfer prior to UT's bowl game. All three were reserve players.

=== Depth chart ===
Defense

FS
Michael Griffin
Marcus Griffin
⋅

WILL	MIKE	SAM
Rashad Bobino	Aaron Harris	Robert Killebrew
Drew Kelson	Chris Brown	Eric Foreman
⋅	⋅	⋅

SS
Michael Huff
Matt Melton
⋅

CB
Tarell Brown
Aaron Ross
Erick Jackson
⋅

DE	DT	DT	DE
Tim Crowder	Frank Okam	Rodrique Wright	Brian Robison
Eric Hall	Larry Dibbles	Derek Lokey	Brian Orakpo
⋅	⋅	⋅	⋅

CB
Cedric Griffin
Brandon Foster
⋅

Offense

FLANKER
Quan Cosby
Nate Jones
Brian Carter

LT	LG	C	RG	RT
Jonathan Scott	Kasey Studdard	Lyle Sendlein	Will Allen	Justin Blalock
Tony Hills	Mike Garcia	Dallas Griffin	Cedrick Dockery	William Winston
⋅	⋅	⋅	⋅	⋅

TE
David Thomas
Neale Tweedie
⋅

SPLIT END
Limas Sweed
Tyrell Gatewood
HB Billy Pittman

QB
Vince Young
Matt Nordgren
⋅

RB
Jamaal Charles
Ramonce Taylor
Selvin Young
Henry Melton
⋅

FB
Ahmard Hall
Michael Houston
⋅

Special teams
PK David Pino
P Richmond McGee
KR Ramonce Taylor
PR Aaron Ross
LS \

== Game summaries ==
=== Louisiana Lafayette ===
Team	1	2	3	4	Total
Louisiana-Lafayette	3	0	0	0	3
• Texas	13	26	14	7	60

- Date: September 3
- Location: Darrell K Royal–Texas Memorial Stadium, Austin, Texas
- Game start: 7:00
- TV announcers (FSN): Joel Meyers, Dave Lapham, Jim Knox

This game marked the second meeting of the Texas Longhorns and the Louisiana Lafayette Ragin' Cajuns. In their first meeting in 2000, UT fell behind 10–0 before quarterback Major Applewhite entered the game late in the first quarter and threw for 315 yards and 4 touchdowns as the Longhorns scored 52 unanswered points in a 52–10 victory.

Prior to kickoff of the 2005 game, the stadium announcer made an appeal for donations to help those suffering in the aftermath of Hurricane Katrina, which devastated parts of Louisiana five days previously. Donations were not accepted at the game because of a policy against official fund-raising. As the Longhorns entered the field, special teams player Karim Meijer carried a United States flag that was given to the team on Thursday by former Longhorn Nathan Kaspar who flew the flag during missions in southeastern Iraq. For this game only, the Longhorns wore throwback uniforms furnished by Nike as a way of honoring the past. The throwback jerseys were similar to jerseys worn during their 1963 National Championship season under Coach Darrell K. Royal. Football's origins in the Northeastern United States have created an expectation that it is a cold-weather sport, but the temperature at kickoff was 90 °F (32 °C) which is also the average temperature in Austin for the month of September.

Texas scored first when Selvin Young ran the ball in for a touchdown. The extra point attempt by Richmond McGee was no good. The Cajuns were able to score three points on a field goal by Sean Comiskey making the score Texas 6, Louisiana Lafayette 3. Texas replied with 54 unanswered points to win the game 60–3. With the win, Texas improved its record in season-opening games to 93–17–3 and 72–2–2 when they open the year at home. That figure includes 11 straight wins and victories in 30 of their last 31 games at home. Their home record under Mack Brown improved to 39 wins and 3 losses.

Several new Longhorn players entered the game. True freshman running back Jamaal Charles set the UT rushing record for a debut game with 135 yards and a rushing touchdown alongside one reception for 18 yards, after taking over during the game for injured running back Selvin Young. True freshman running back Henry Melton also saw his first action and scored his first touchdown at the college level. True freshman Quan Cosby got his first college start, and two other true freshmen (Roy Miller and Aaron Lewis) saw action.

=== Ohio State ===
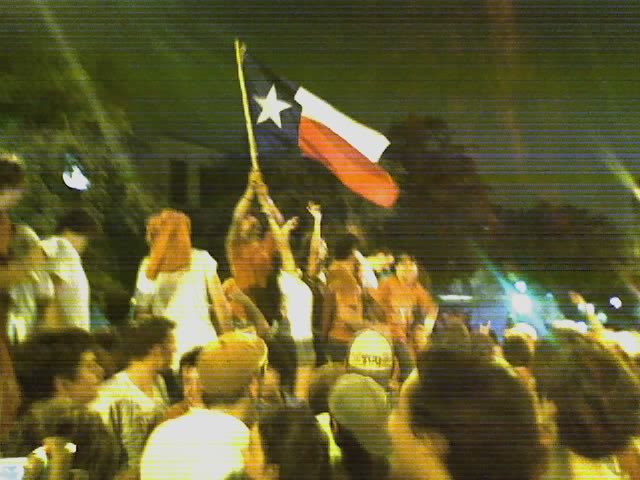
After the game, spontaneous celebrations occurred along Guadalupe Street (the "Drag") which runs adjacent to the UT campus.

Team	1	2	3	4	Total
• Texas	10	3	3	9	25
Ohio St	0	16	6	0	22

- Date: September 10
- Location: Ohio Stadium, Columbus, Ohio
- Game start: 8:00 p.m. EST
- TV announcers (ABC): Brent Musburger, Gary Danielson, Jack Arute

Scoring summary
Q1	10:03	TEX	David Pino 42 yard field goal	TEX 3–0
Q1	1:37	TEX	Billy Pittman 5 yard pass from Vince Young (David Pino kick)	TEX 10–0
Q2	14:17	OHST	Josh Huston 47 yard field goal	TEX 10–3
Q2	8:11	OHST	Santonio Holmes 36 yard pass from Troy Smith (Josh Huston kick)	Tie 10–10
Q2	4:33	OHST	Josh Huston 36 yard field goal	OHST 13–10
Q2	:35	OHST	Josh Huston 25 yard field goal	OHST 16–10
Q2	:02	TEX	David Pino 37 yard field goal	OHST 16–13
Q3	11:46	OHST	Josh Huston 44 yard field goal	OHST 19–13
Q3	7:36	TEX	David Pino 25 yard field goal	OHST 19–16
Q3	5:12	OHST	Josh Huston 26 yard field goal	OHST 22–16
Q4	2:37	TEX	Limas Sweed 24 yard pass from Vince Young (David Pino kick)	TEX 23–22
Q4	:19	TEX	Safety, Troy Smith tackled by Larry Dibbles in end zone	TEX 25–22

According to USA Today, the match-up between the Longhorns and the Ohio State Buckeyes (OSU) was one of the most-anticipated games of the 2005 season. Teams have become increasingly conservative in scheduling highly ranked non-conference opponents, so a meeting of the number 2 and number 4 teams in the country was unusual this early in the season. Because of the significance of the game in the national championship race, ESPN College GameDay chose the game as the site of its weekly broadcast. The American Football Coaches Association brought the national championship trophy to the game and displayed it on the field near Bevo, the UT mascot (photo below).

Texas and Ohio State are two of the oldest and "most storied" programs in college football, but this game was the first meeting between the two teams. For Texas, it meant playing a second Big Ten Conference "powerhouse" less than one year after winning the first meeting between Texas and the University of Michigan at the end of the 2004 season.

The game was played in Ohio Stadium, also known as "The Horseshoe" or "the Shoe". This stadium is notoriously tough for visiting teams, as its large capacity and structural design focus a tremendous amount of crowd noise that can make it difficult for the visiting team to call audibles at the line of scrimmage.

Texas scored first with a 42-yard field goal, which was a career-long for Longhorn kicker David Pino. A five-yard touchdown pass from Vince Young to Billy Pittman gave the Longhorns a 10–0 lead at the end of the first quarter. The Buckeyes controlled most of the second quarter. Their first score was a 45 yd field goal by Josh Huston followed by a 36-yard touchdown pass from Troy Smith to Santonio Holmes to tie the score at 10–10. They took the lead with two more field goals from Josh Huston. Texas made a field goal to trim Ohio State's lead to 16–13 at the half. In the third quarter, Texas made one field goal and OSU made two, extending Ohio State's lead to 22–16. In the fourth quarter, Texas regained the lead with a touchdown pass from Young to Limas Sweed. UT's Aaron Harris sacked OSU's Troy Smith for a safety and Texas took a three-point lead, which they held when time expired.

Texas' win, by a score of 25–22, was the lowest scoring game Texas would experience all season, both in terms of points scored by Texas and total points. Fourth-ranked OSU became the highest-ranked non-conference opponent the Longhorns had ever beaten at an opponent's home stadium. The previous high came in 1983 when third-ranked Texas pulled off a 20–7 upset versus fifth-ranked Auburn. Texas became the first non-conference opponent to beat the Buckeyes in Ohio Stadium since 1990, putting an end to a 36-game home victory string over non-conference opponents. The Longhorns also were the first team to beat the Buckeyes in a night game at The Horseshoe and it was UT's 10th straight victory in a night-game road contest. ESPN and College Football Rivals each named the game one of the best football games of the season.

=== Rice ===
Team	1	2	3	4	Total
Rice	0	0	3	7	10
• Texas	14	28	9	0	51

- Date: September 17
- Location: Darrell K Royal–Texas Memorial Stadium, Austin, Texas
- Game start: 7:00
- TV announcers (FSN): Joel Meyers, Dave Lapham, Jim Knox

The Rice Owls and Texas met in 2005 for the 88th time. Texas held a 65–21–1 lead in the series, which began in 1914. For the Longhorns this series ranks fourth in number of games played, behind Texas A&M, Oklahoma, and Baylor. The two schools were once conference foes in the Southwest Conference and have maintained a rivalry despite the fact that Texas enjoys a sizable lead in the series. President John F. Kennedy alluded to the lopsidedness of the rivalry in his 1962 speech on America's space program: "But why, some say, the Moon? ... And they may well ask why climb the highest mountain. Why, 35 years ago, fly the Atlantic? Why does Rice play Texas? ... We choose to go to the Moon ... and do the other things, not because they are easy, but because they are hard." In addition to continuing a traditional rivalry, playing Rice in a home and away series allows for Texas to play games in Houston, Texas, an important recruiting base for UT, which has a significant Texas Exes alumni population.

The Horns took possession of the ball to start the game and used less than two minutes in scoring on a 25-yard carry by Jamaal Charles. Rice advanced to the Texas 43-yard line before punting the ball to Texas' one-yard line, forcing the Longhorns to start from inside their own end zone. UT drove the ball 99 yards in seven plays for a second touchdown. With four seconds left in the first quarter, Vince Young threw a pass that was intercepted by Ja'Corey Shepherd at the UT 20-yard line. Rice lost yardage on their possession and failed to convert on fourth down so they turned the ball over on downs. The rest of the first-half scoring was dominated by the Longhorns as they scored four more touchdowns to take a 42–0 lead. The Owls had four–more possessions in the second–quarter but never advanced the ball past their own 30-yard line.

In the second half, each team scored one field goal and one touchdown, although Texas missed their extra point so they won the game 51–10. UT's Jamaal Charles ran for 189 yards and three touchdowns on 16 carries in his first start for the Longhorns. After the game, Charles said that his goal was to rush for 200 yards each game but that he was not disappointed to fall short of 200 yards rushing because he hit his goal of rushing for three touchdowns.

=== Missouri ===
Team	1	2	3	4	Total
• Texas	14	10	13	14	51
Missouri	13	0	0	7	20

- Date: October 1
- Location: Faurot Field, Columbia, Missouri
- Game start: 12:00
- TV announcers (ABC): Gary Thorne, Ed Cunningham, Mark Morgan

Sportscasters touted the contest with the Missouri Tigers as a showcase between of the two best dual-threat quarterbacks playing in college football, pitting Missouri quarterback Brad Smith against Vince Young of Texas. The two players combined for 582 yards total offense. Both Young and Smith led their respective team in rushing yards. Young had 108 rushing yards while Smith had 57. Young had 236 passing yards compared to Smith's 181.

The Longhorns and the Tigers each scored two touchdowns in the first quarter, though Missouri missed an extra point to let Texas take a 14–13 lead. Texas scored another touchdown and a field goal to make a 24–13 lead at halftime. In the second half, Texas scored four more touchdowns, missing one extra point to increase their lead to 51–13. Missouri was scoreless for 40 minutes of play until they scored a touchdown with 3:54 left to play; it was their only score of the second half. Texas won the game 51–20 to extend its series lead over Missouri to 15–5.

=== Oklahoma ===
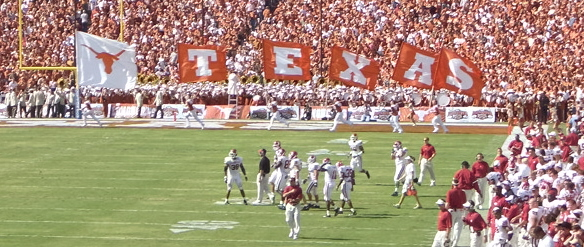
2005 Red River Shootout – fourth quarter

Team	1	2	3	4	Total
Oklahoma	6	0	0	6	12
• Texas	14	10	7	14	45

- Date: October 8
- Location: Cotton Bowl, Dallas, Texas
- Game start: 1:00 p.m. EST
- TV announcers (ABC): Keith Jackson, Dan Fouts, Todd Harris
- Source: ESPN

Scoring summary
1	9:04	TEX	Ramonce Taylor 15-yard pass from Vince Young (David Pino kick)	TEX 7-0
1	4:16	OKLA	Garrett Hartley 52-yard field goal	TEX 7-3
1	1:31	OKLA	Garrett Hartley 26-yard field goal	TEX 7-6
1	1:18	TEX	Jamaal Charles 80-yard run (David Pino kick)	TEX 14-6
2	3:46	TEX	David Pino 37-yard field goal	TEX 17-6
2	0:17	TEX	Billy Pittman 64-yard pass from Vince Young (David Pino kick)	TEX 24-6
3	5:26	TEX	Billy Pittman 27-yard pass from Vince Young (David Pino kick)	TEX 31-6
4	13:06	TEX	Selvin Young 5-yard run (David Pino kick)	TEX 38-6
4	11:35	OKLA	Joe Jon Finley 15-yard pass from Rhett Bomar (pass failed)	TEX 38-12
4	7:41	TEX	Rodrique Wright 67-yard fumble return (David Pino kick)	TEX 45-12

Football fans consider the annual game between Texas and the Oklahoma Sooners (OU) one of the greatest rivalries games in all of college sports. Though officially called the Red River Rivalry, it remains better known by its traditional name, the Red River Shootout; the 2005 match-up was the 100th in the series.

Since 1912 the teams have played the game at the Cotton Bowl stadium in Dallas, Texas, amid the atmosphere of the adjacent Texas State Fair. This is unusual because most college football games alternate between the opponents home stadiums. Dallas was chosen as the neutral site because it is approximately halfway between the two schools. The stadium is divided down the 50-yard line, with half of the stadium predominantly clad in the crimson and cream colors of Oklahoma, and the other half mostly wearing the burnt orange and white of Texas.

The game frequently has implications for the conference and national championship races. Since 1945, at least one of the teams was ranked among the top 25 teams in the nation coming into 60 out of 65 games. Prior to the 2005 game, Texas held an advantage in the all-time series 55–39–5, which included a 43–35–4 edge in Dallas, but Oklahoma had won the 5 previous games, including the two worst losses ever for a Texas team in the series. Those losses had helped build a reputation that Mack Brown was not capable of winning in "Big Games". Four times during those five years, Texas' loss to Oklahoma prevented them from playing in the Big 12 Conference Championship Game. One of these two teams appeared in four of the nine BCS national championship games from 1999 to 2007.

The Longhorns scored first with a touchdown pass from Vince Young to Ramonce Taylor; this was the first time for Texas to lead Oklahoma since 2002 and Texas' first passing touchdown against Oklahoma since 2000. The Sooners' Garrett Hartley answered with a 52-yard field goal, the longest of his college career, and a 9-yard field goal. Longhorn Jamaal Charles scored next on an 80-yard touchdown run. UT then scored with a 38-yard field goal by Richmond McGee and a 64-yard long bomb from Young to Billy Pittman just before halftime, giving Texas a 24–6 lead at the half. UT made the only score of the third quarter: a 27-yard touchdown pass from Young to Pittman. In the fourth quarter UT scored two touchdowns while OU scored one.

UT was favored by 14 points and won the game by 33 points, tying the biggest margin of victory for the Longhorns in the history of the rivalry, a 40–7 victory in 1941. The game also marked the sixth time the Longhorns entered the contest ranked second nationally; they have won all six. With the win, Texas started their season 5–0 for the first time since 1983.

=== Colorado ===
Team	1	2	3	4	Total
Colorado	0	10	0	7	17
• Texas	14	21	0	7	42

- Date: October 15
- Location: Darrell K Royal-Memorial Stadium, Austin, Texas
- Game start: 3:30
- TV announcers (ABC): Mike Tirico, Tim Brant, Suzy Shuster

Of all the teams on Texas regular season schedule, Colorado had the best historical record against Texas up to the start of the season. The all-time record was tied at 7–7, and the record since the formation of the Big 12 conference was tied at 3–3. Texas established a lead early in the game and never lost it; they led 35–10 at halftime and defeated the 2005 Colorado team by a final score of 42–17.

Texas scored touchdowns on all five of their first half possessions; these included three rushing touchdowns by Vince Young, one rushing touchdown by Selvin Young, and one touchdown pass from Vince Young to Limas Sweed. Colorado was scoreless in the first quarter. In the second quarter they scored with a 48-yard field goal by Mason Crosby and a touchdown pass from Joel Klatt to Evan Judge. After neither team scored in the third quarter, each team completed one touchdown pass in the final period.

Vince Young had the best statistical performance of his career to date, completing 25 of 29 passing attempts for 336 yards and two passing touchdowns in addition to 58 yards rushing and 3 rushing touchdowns. His 86.2% completion percentage set a new single-game record for UT, breaking his previous record of 85.7% set against Oklahoma State in 2004. After the game, Colorado Head Coach Gary Barnett said of Young's passing performance, "We can't do that in practice against air." meaning that his team would not have been able to complete 86.2% of their passes even if playing unopposed.

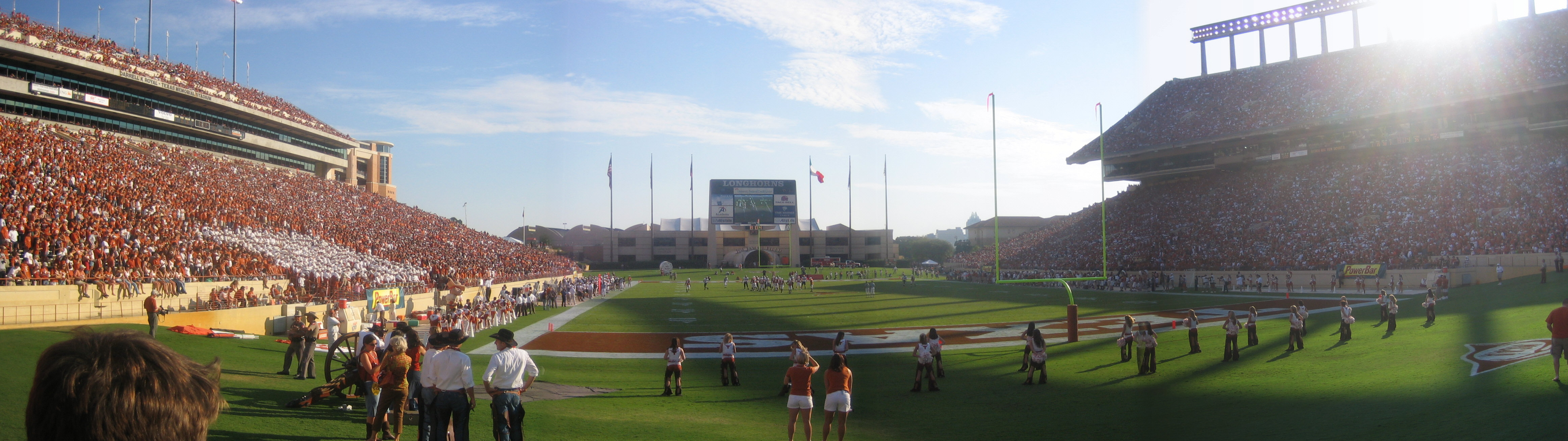
Colorado at Texas

=== Texas Tech ===
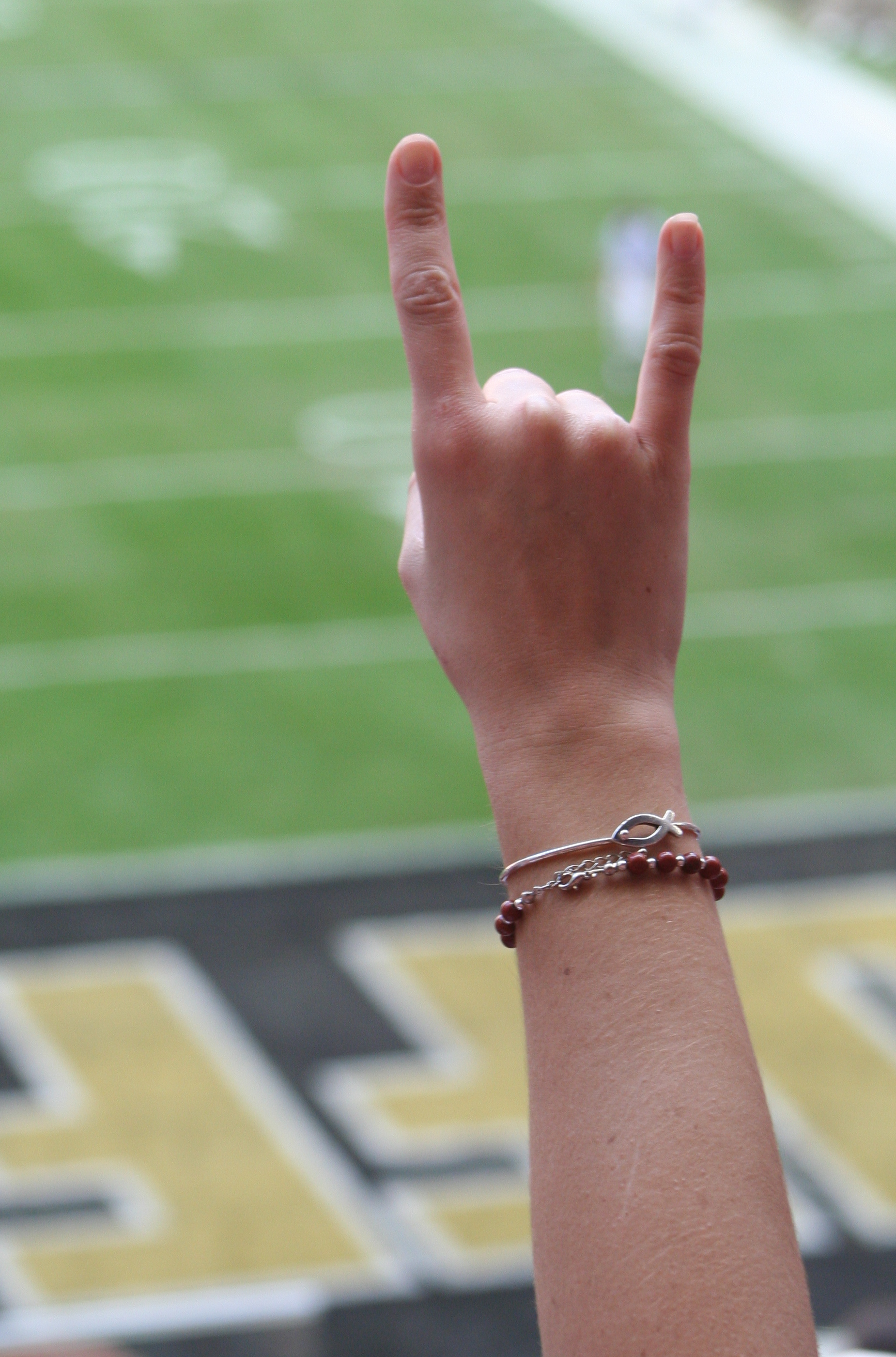
A fan gives the Hook 'em Horns sign. The 2005 season marked the 50th anniversary of the hand sign, one of the most widely recognized hand signs in college sports.

Team	1	2	3	4	Total
Texas Tech	7	3	7	0	17
• Texas	10	21	14	7	52

- Date: October 22
- Location: Darrell K Royal–Texas Memorial Stadium, Austin, Texas
- Game start: 3:30
- TV announcers (ABC): Brent Musburger, Gary Danielson, Jack Arute

The Texas Tech Red Raiders came into the game undefeated and ranked number 10 in the nation with hopes of beating Texas, winning out the season, and playing for a national championship.

The Longhorns scored a field goal on their first possession and Texas Tech answered with a touchdown pass by Cody Hodges. Texas regained the lead when Henry Melton rushed for a touchdown. In the second quarter, the Red Raiders tied up the game with a field goal before Texas regained the lead with two touchdown runs by Selvin Young and a touchdown pass to Billy Pittman. In the third quarter, the Longhorns extended their lead with two touchdowns to one by Texas Tech. Texas' seventh touchdown came with 6:30 left in the game and it was the last points scored in the game.

Texas won the game 52–17 and moved into first place in the Bowl Championship Series (BCS) standings for the first time since they were implemented in 1998. The BCS formula took into account strength of schedule so that teams received more credit for beating stronger opponents. This allowed Texas to advance in the rankings since they beat an unbeaten team while University of Southern California, who previously held the number one spot, beat Washington, a 1–6 team.

The week following the Texas Tech game Vince Young said he still planned to return for his senior season in 2006. Young, a candidate for the Heisman Trophy, also apologized for striking the "Heisman pose" during the win over Texas Tech; this had been viewed as an immodest indiscretion.

=== Oklahoma State ===
Team	1	2	3	4	Total
• Texas	9	3	22	13	47
Oklahoma St	21	7	0	0	28

- Date: October 29
- Location: Boone Pickens Stadium, Stillwater, Oklahoma
- Game start: 7:00
- TV announcers (TBS): Ron Thulin, Charles Davis, Craig Sager

Texas place at the top of the BCS rankings lasted only one week. On October 29, 2005, Texas initially trailed but rallied to beat an Oklahoma State Cowboys team that had held a losing record through the season so far. Texas retained the top spot in the computer rankings, but not by enough to stay ahead of USC in the overall BCS standings.

Oklahoma State scored first, with a surprising 48 yard pass from Al Pena to D'Juan Woods. The Cowboys had lined up tight on 4th and inches as if trying a short, power run, but faked that play and threw a deep pass instead, catching the Longhorn defense off-guard. Texas replied with a touchdown pass from Young to Thomas, but David Pino missed the extra point, allowing the Cowboys to retain the lead. Oklahoma State scored another touchdown and Texas completed a field goal to make the score 21–9 at the end of the first quarter. The Cowboys scored one touchdown in the second quarter off of a pass that was deflected by Texas, and Texas made a field goal near the end to cut into the lead, leaving Oklahoma State ahead 28–12 at halftime. The second half was dominated by Texas as they scored five unanswered touchdowns to win the game. The scores consisted of two rushing touchdowns by Vince Young, two rushing touchdowns by Ramonce Taylor, and a 21-yard touchdown pass to Neale Tweedie.

Despite Oklahoma State's 0–4 start to conference play, they led Texas the entire first half, including a lead of as much as nineteen points. It was the third straight year that Texas trailed Oklahoma State at halftime and came from behind to win by a sizable margin (47–28). Vince Young set a school record for total yards in one game with 506 yards (239 passing, 267 rushing). Young also became one of only seven players in NCAA history to have accumulated over 200 yards rushing and 200 yards passing in a single game. Over the past three meetings between the two schools (2003–2005), the Longhorns outscored the Cowboys by a combined second-half score of 118–0.

TBS announced that the Longhorns' come-from-behind victory scored a record viewership rating of 1.927 million viewers. This represented a 21 percent increase over the previous TBS network record for Southern California vs. Stanford in 2004.

=== Baylor ===
Team	1	2	3	4	Total
• Texas	6	21	21	14	62
Baylor	0	0	0	0	0

- Date: November 5
- Location: Floyd Casey Stadium, Waco, Texas
- Game start: 12:30
- TV announcers (FSN): Joel Meyers, Dave Lapham, John Rhadigan

The Longhorns first played the Baylor Bears in 1901 and have faced them annually since both were members of the Southwest Conference. In the 95 meetings through 2005, Texas' record was 69 wins, 22 losses, and 4 ties. Only Texas A&M and the University of Oklahoma had faced Texas more often on the football field.

Texas was stopped on their first drive due to an unsuccessful fourth down conversion. Baylor's first possession ended when UT's Michael Huff intercepted a pass from Baylor's Terrance Park. Longhorn Jamaal Charles scored a touchdown on the drive but the kick was blocked, giving Texas the only first-quarter score and a 6–0 lead. Texas extended the lead in the second quarter with rushing touchdowns from Henry Melton, Jamaal Charles, and Ramonce Taylor. Taylor made two more touchdowns in the third quarter and Quan Cosby caught a touchdown pass from Young. In the fourth quarter, Taylor scored his fourth touchdown and backup quarterback Matt Nordgren scored on an odd play where he was hit and fumbled while scrambling for the goal line but the ball traveled forward at about the same speed he was running and bounced right back up into his hands. Texas won the 2005 game 62–0 making it the only shutout of the 2005 season for the Longhorns.

The 2005 Baylor game was played in Waco, Texas, approximately 100 miles (161 km) north on Interstate 35 from Austin. Since UT home games are usually sold out and Waco is relatively close to Austin, recent games against Baylor have attracted numerous Texas fans driving to Waco to see the game. The Baylor athletic department suspended ticket sales at one point in an effort to limit the number of Longhorn fans who purchased tickets. The average attendance for Baylor's home games for the season was 38,899, but for the UT game the attendance was 44,783 still short of the 50,000 official capacity for Baylor's Floyd Casey Stadium.

=== Kansas ===
Team	1	2	3	4	Total
Kansas	0	0	14	0	14
• Texas	28	24	7	7	66

- Date: November 12
- Location: Darrell K Royal–Texas Memorial Stadium, Austin, Texas
- Game start: 3:30
- TV announcers (ABC): Brad Nessler, Bob Griese, Lynn Swann

In order to win the 2004 game against the Kansas Jayhawks, Texas had to convert a 4th-and-18 situation and complete a touchdown pass with only eleven seconds remaining on the clock. The 2005 game provided much less on-field drama, as Texas led 52–0 by halftime and defeated Kansas 66–14.

In the first quarter, Texas scored touchdowns on a pass to Limas Sweed, a run by Jamaal Charles, a pass to Quan Cosby, and a punt return by Aaron Ross. In the second quarter, the Longhorns had a touchdown run by Ramonce Taylor and touchdown catches from David Thomas and Peter Ullman. David Pino also kicked a field goal for the Horns. In the third quarter, Kansas opened the scoring with a 59-yard touchdown by Jon Cornish. Taylor scored another touchdown. UT had the only score of the fourth quarter, a touchdown by Selvin Young.

UT fans were unhappy with ABC's television coverage of the event. The network elected to stick with the Oklahoma vs. Texas A&M game instead of switching to the Kansas vs. Texas game. ABC stayed with the Oklahoma vs. A&M game through the final down and then ran three full minutes of commercials while the Texas vs. Kansas game continued. By the time they switched over Texas was already leading 14–0. The ABC announcers started their coverage saying "And now, we'll join the game you've been waiting for all week, which has pretty much already been decided." ABC then broke away from their coverage at halftime to broadcast other events. This left thousands of UT fans who assembled to watch the game in Darrell K. Royal – Texas Memorial Stadium stranded without coverage for much of the game.

The lopsided victory allowed Texas to play several less-experienced players. Back-up quarterback Matt Nordgren entered the game in the third quarter, replacing Vince Young. Third-string quarterback Matt McCoy replaced Nordgren just past the midpoint of the fourth quarter. Since Colt McCoy was listed third on the UT depth chart, television broadcasters referred to Matt McCoy (no relation) as Colt McCoy, a mistake they repeated over the season. The Longhorns did not play Colt in the 2005 season, choosing to redshirt him instead. After viewing this game as part of a recruiting visit to UT, Jevan Snead – ranked as one of the top high school quarterbacks in the nation, elected to switch his commitment from University of Florida to Texas.

=== Texas A&M ===
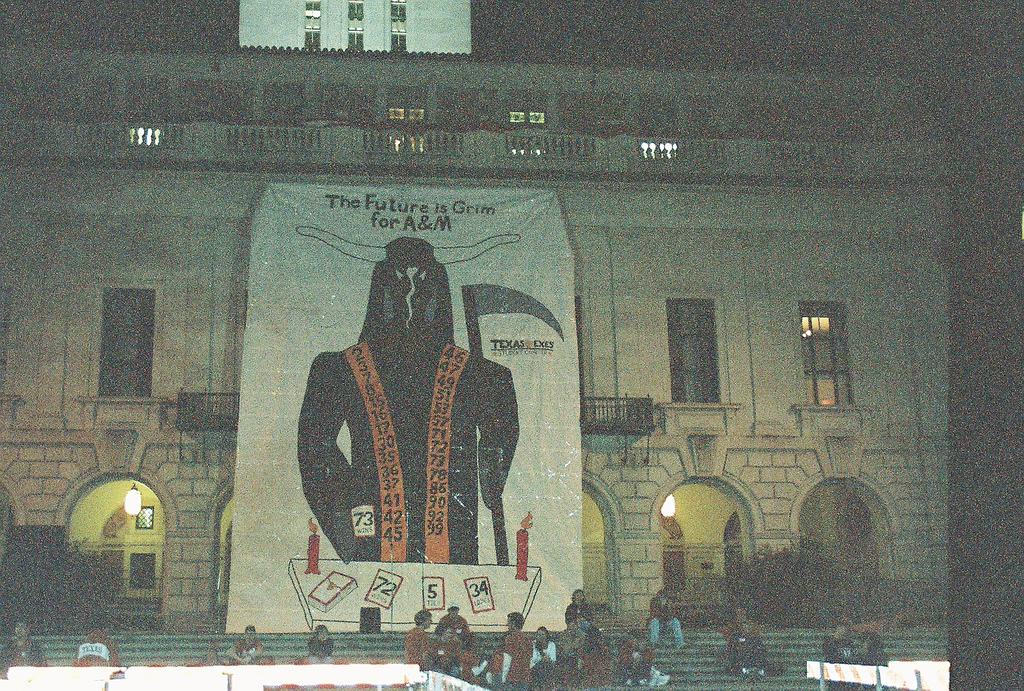
Poster hanging from the UT Tower during the 2005 Hex Rally

Team	1	2	3	4	Total
• Texas	14	7	13	6	40
Texas A&M	9	6	14	0	29

- Date: November 25
- Location: Kyle Field, College Station, Texas
- Game start: 12:00
- TV announcers (ABC): Gary Thorne, Ed Cunningham, Craig James, Vince Welch

This game marked the 112th meeting between Texas and the Texas A&M Aggies and the game is part of a multi-sport rivalry called the Lone Star Showdown. It is the longest-running rivalry for both the Longhorns and the Aggies and the football series is the third most-played rivalry in college football. Texas came into the 2005 contest with a 72–34–5 record. During the week before the game, the Longhorns conducted their traditional Hex Rally. As a result of a tragic accident in 1999, the Aggies did not host a school-sponsored version of their traditional Bonfire but an unofficial version called "Student Bonfire" was held November 19, 2005 despite a county-wide ban on bonfires. The game's attendance was 86,616, which was 4,016 more than the official stadium capacity for Kyle Field.

Like the contest against Missouri, sportswriters touted the Texas A&M game as showcasing two of the best dual-threat quarterbacks playing in college football. However, Texas A&M's starting quarterback Reggie McNeal missed the game due to an ankle injury; instead, freshman quarterback Stephen McGee made his first start. The game was a back-and-forth affair ultimately won by Texas, 40–29. The eleven point win was their second slimmest margin of victory of the regular season to that point, and they lost points in all three major polls but still remained solidly in second place.

The game was the poorest performance of the season by the Longhorns, both offensively and defensively. On offense, Vince Young had only 162 yards of offense, his lowest output of the season. The Associated Press remarked on the poor performance and said that Young, considered one of the nations best quarterbacks and a Heisman trophy candidate coming into the game, was "not even the best quarterback on the field that day". The Daily Texan predicted that the game could hurt Young's chances for the Heisman, but they also quoted UT head coach Mack Brown as saying "Looking at the numbers from what Reggie Bush did last week and Vince did today, Reggie probably leads, but next week, Vince plays at noon, and Reggie at 3, so I think voters will wait and watch to see what happens."

UT running backs Henry Melton and Ramonce Taylor also received criticism. Taylor was criticized for running backwards and sideways in an effort to gain yards, instead of moving ahead and breaking tackles. The Daily Texan observed "Five of Taylor's 15 carries resulted in a loss or no gain for a total of minus-17 yards. However, the other 10 carries totaled 119 yards for an average of 11.9 yards per positive running play. The sophomore didn't have a positive gain of fewer than 5 yards and accumulated three runs of 20 yards or longer." Greg Davis, UT's offensive coordinator, said "Ramonce is a darter. The only time that really concerned me was a third-and-two situation. We talked to him on the sideline about a little bit more down and distance awareness." Melton was criticized for "tiptoeing indecisively". and letting himself get tackled near the line of scrimmage.

On defense, the Longhorns held A&M to only 118 yards passing but gave up 277 yards rushing; the highest allowed by the Longhorns all season. Despite the poor outing, Texas finished the regular season undefeated. Gene Chizik, UT's defensive coordinator, said "This really is an eye-opening experience. Obviously, we've got to get better. But I'll tell you what, we're all going to drive home 11–0."

=== Vs. Colorado – Big 12 Championship ===
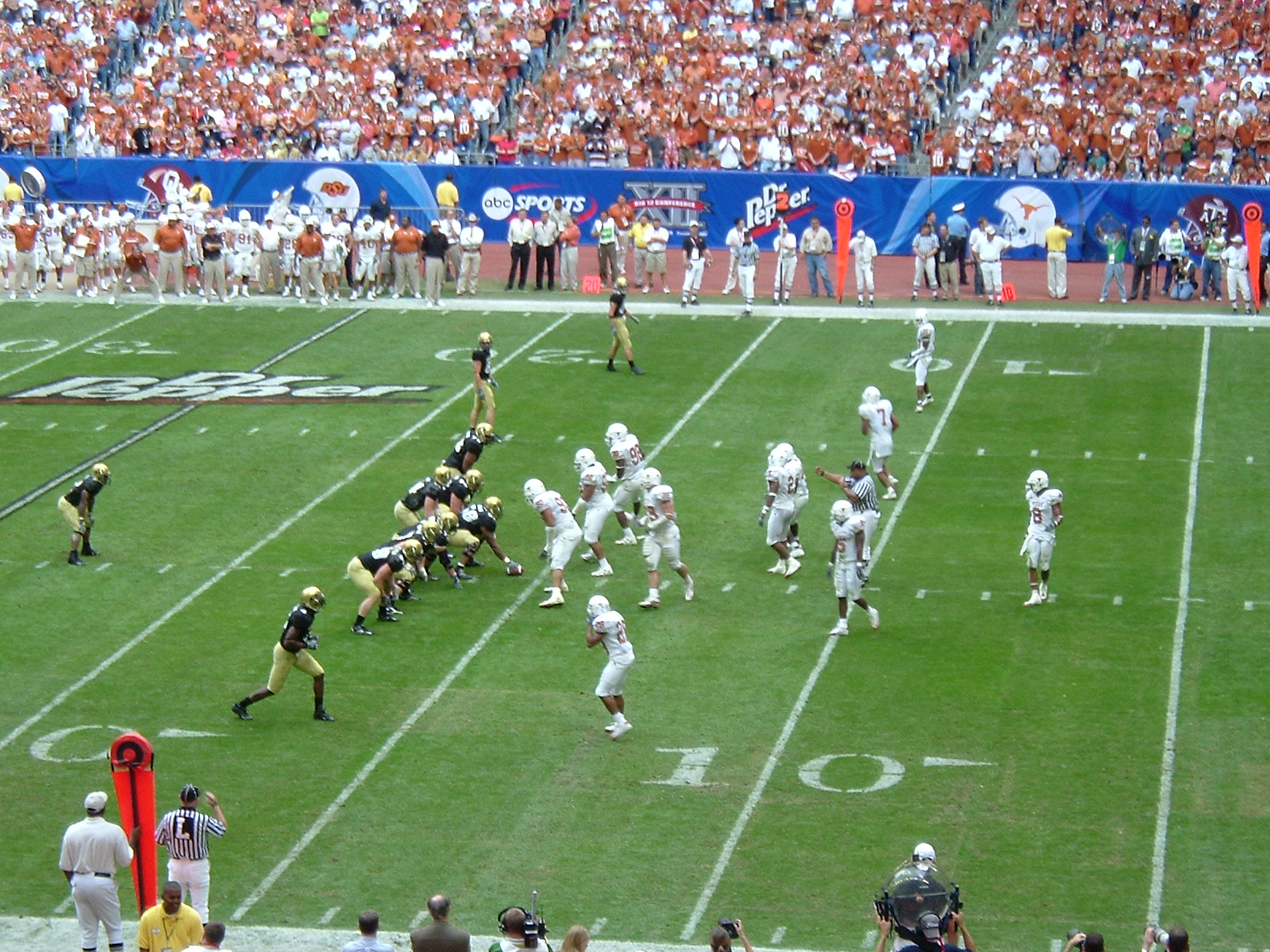
Texas lining up on defense against the Buffaloes

Team	1	2	3	4	Total
• Texas	14	28	28	0	70
Colorado	0	3	0	0	3

- Date: December 3
- Location: Reliant Stadium, Houston, Texas
- Game start: 12:00
- TV announcers (ABC): Brad Nessler, Bob Griese, Lynn Swann

The Big 12 Championship Game is held by the Big 12 Conference each year. The championship game pits the Big 12 North Division champion against the South Division champion in a game held after the regular season has been completed. Despite losing the last two games of the regular season, Colorado retained the best record in the North Division of the Big 12 Conference. Prior to the game, Colorado head coach Gary Barnett said, "I do not think anybody expects us to come in here and beat Texas." His team lost the game 70–3, the most lopsided score in any college football conference championship to date.

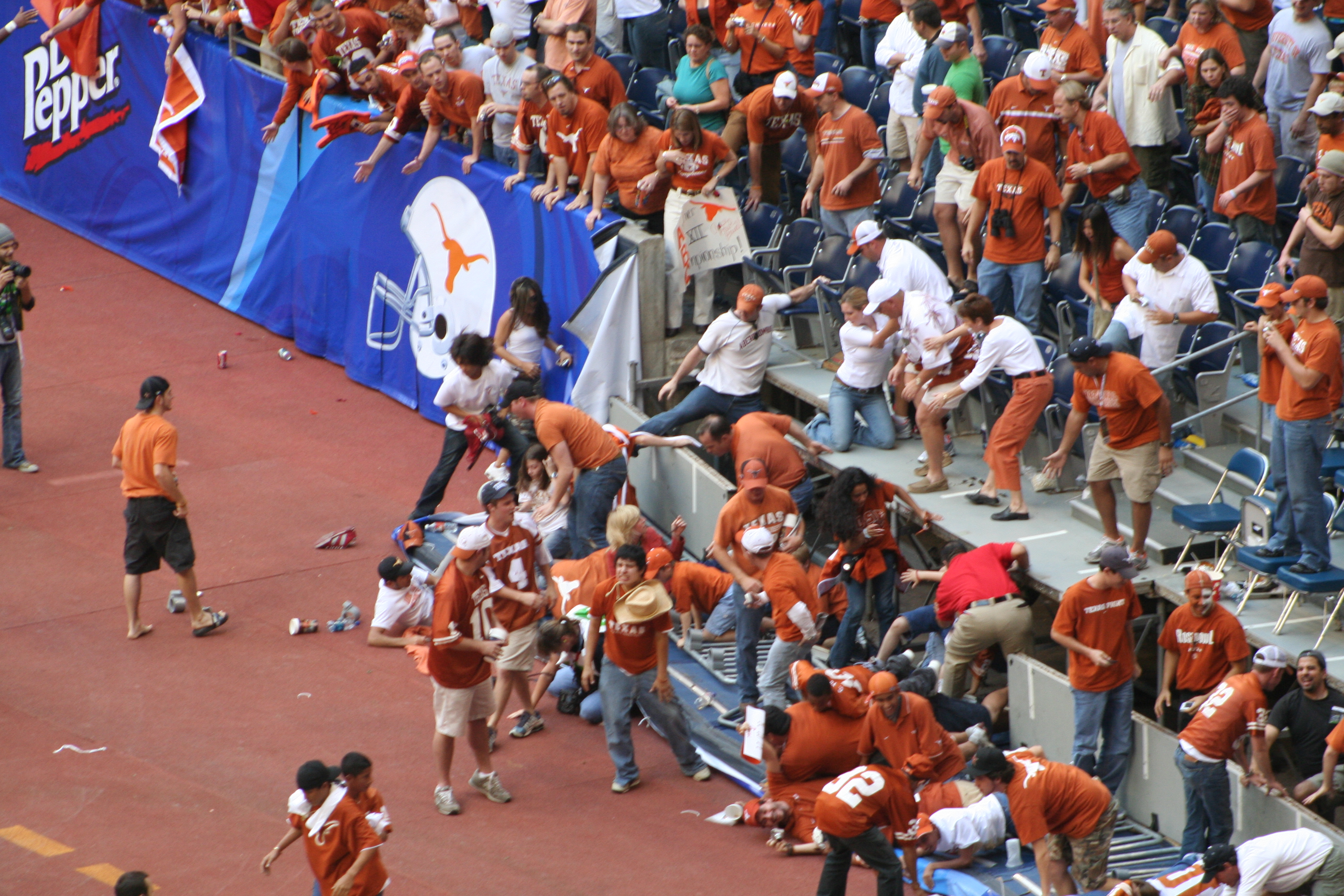
A railing collapsed after the end of the Big 12 Championship Game, causing minor injuries to fans.

The Longhorns scored ten touchdowns in their first eleven possessions. They started with first-quarter touchdowns by Henry Melton and Jamaal Charles. The Buffaloes got their only score of the game, a field goal, at the start of the second quarter. Vince Young, Limas Sweed, David Thomas, and Jamaal Charles scored touchdowns in the second quarter to give the Horns a 42–3 lead at halftime. In the third quarter, Selvin Young, Charles and Melton each scored rushing touchdowns. Brandon Foster scored a touchdown on defense due to Michael Griffin blocking a Colorado punt. Halfway through the third quarter, Texas already had 70 points, but went on cruise control from that point on and did not score again.

Following the victory, the largely UT crowd stayed in the stands to celebrate the Longhorns' return to the Rose Bowl—this time for a shot at a National Championship. As players circled the stadium giving high-fives and handshakes to fans, a section of the railing collapsed and fans spilled onto the sideline. One person suffered injuries and was removed from the field on a stretcher.

Texas earned its second Big 12 football championship to make 27 conference championships total, including 25 in the Southwest Conference. The week after the game, Barnett was fired as Colorado's head coach and replaced by Dan Hawkins, the former head coach of Boise State.

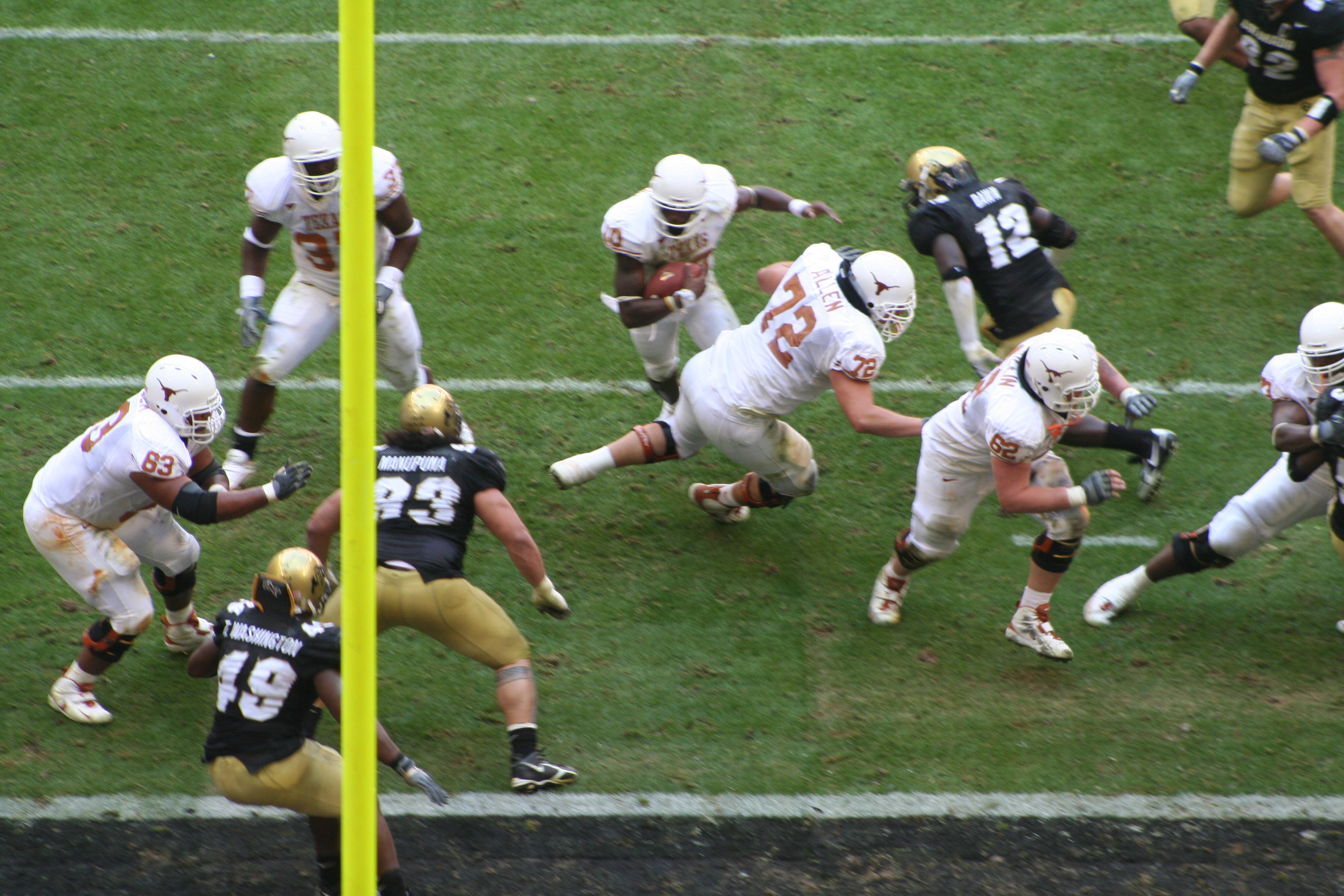
Vince Young scores a touchdown in the 2005 Big 12 Championship Game

=== Vs. USC – Rose Bowl ===
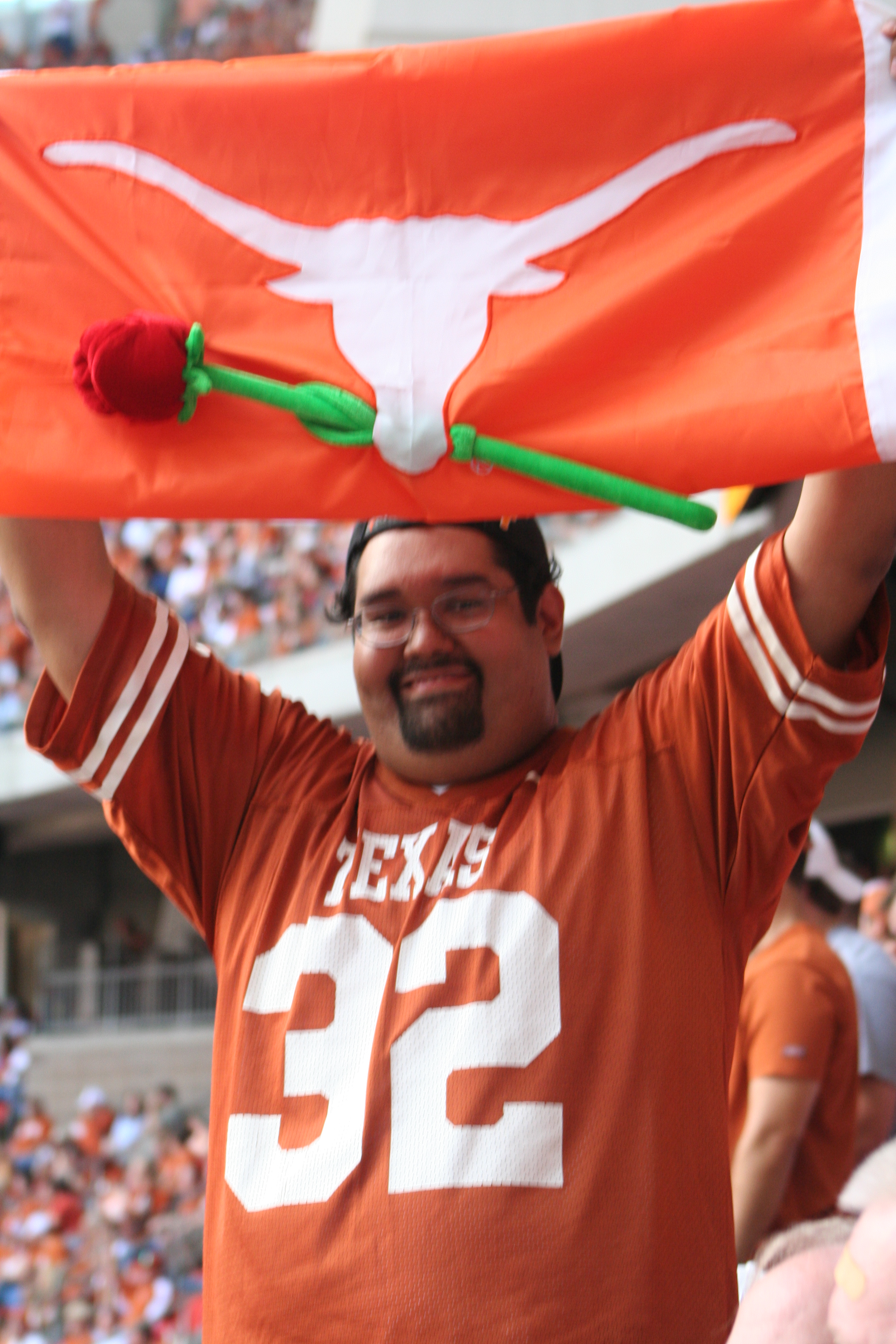
Rose Bowl Bound – a fan at the Big 12 Championship Game celebrates UT's upcoming appearance in the Rose Bowl with a home-made flag.

For the 2005 season, the Rose Bowl also served as the BCS National Championship Game as a result of the Bowl Championship Series agreement. In the weeks leading up to the 2006 Rose Bowl, the game was described by numerous publications as one of the most-anticipated match-ups in college football history and even as the greatest college football game of all time. This was Texas' second trip to the Rose Bowl in school history, alongside their trip the previous season.

Less than three weeks before the game, USC Trojan Reggie Bush won the Heisman Trophy—since vacated—ahead of second place finisher Vince Young. Bush had the second highest number of first place votes in Heisman history (behind O. J. Simpson) and the highest percentage of first place votes, while Young had a record number of second place votes. Bush's 933-point margin of victory was the 17th highest in the history of the Heisman voting. The third finalist was USC's Matt Leinart, who won the Heisman Trophy in 2004. This Rose Bowl would mark the first time two Heisman Trophy winners would play in the same backfield.

The game's outcome was in doubt until the final minute of play. With 19 seconds left on the game clock, Vince Young ran for a touchdown and regained the lead for the Longhorns. He followed up by running the ball into the end zone for a two-point conversion. Leinart had time to attempt one pass but his pass fell out of bounds as time expired; UT beat USC by the score of 41–38.

Young completed 30 of 40 passes for 267 yards and carried the ball 19 times for 200 yards and 3 rushing touchdowns. His 467 total yards set a new Rose Bowl and BCS Championship Game record. He won the Rose Bowl "Most Valuable Player" (MVP) award for the second consecutive year, joining Ron Dayne, Bob Schloredt, and Charles White as the only two-time winners but the only player from outside the Big Ten or Pac-10. David Thomas' ten receptions set a UT record for most receptions in a game by a tight end.

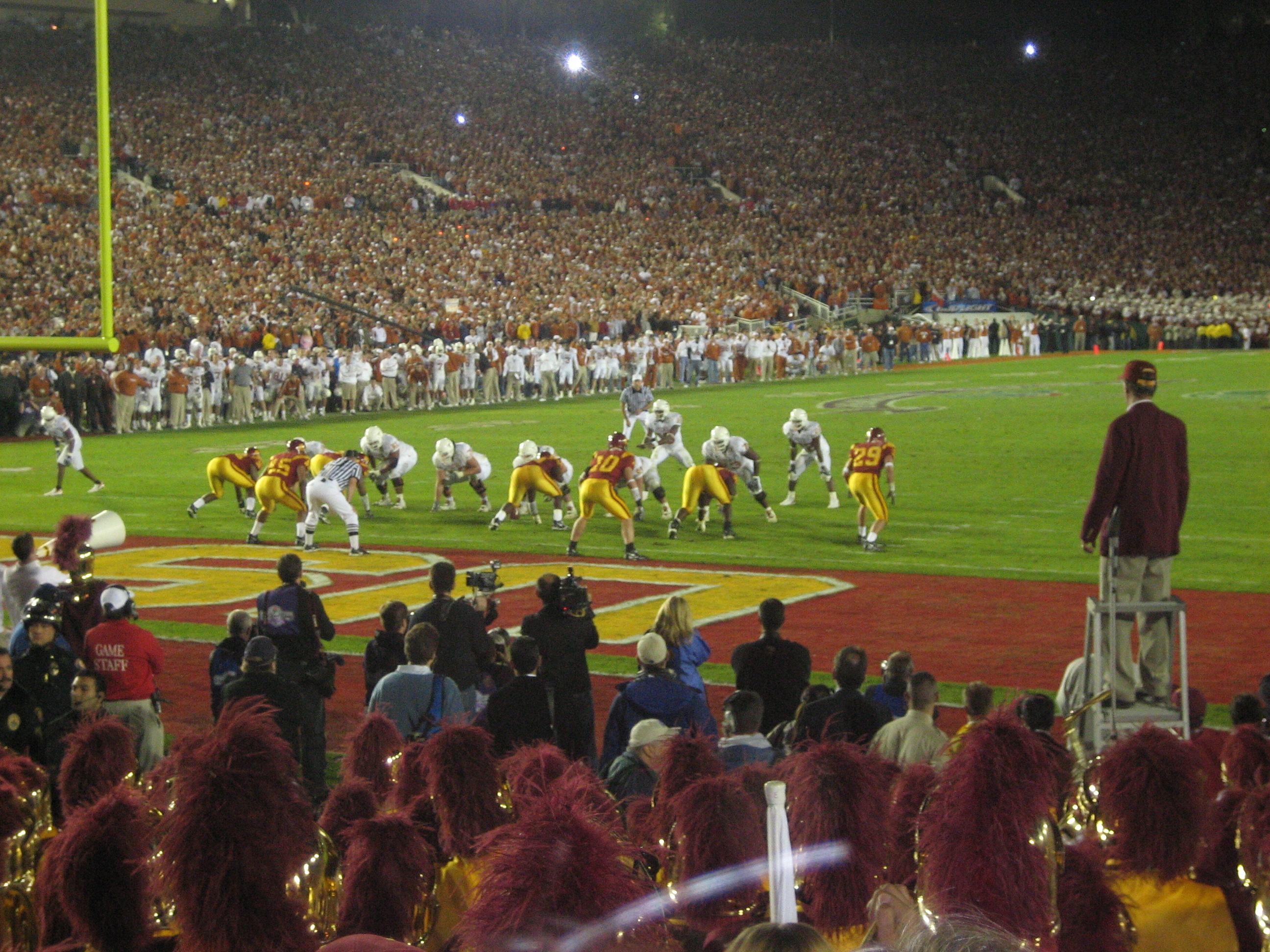
Vince Young about to score the two point conversion after the go-ahead touchdown

Prior to the game, commentators had postulated that the 2005 USC team was one of or even the "greatest team of all-time". ESPN analysts were virtually unanimous in their declaration of the 2005 USC Trojans as the best offense in the history of college football, despite the fact that they were in second place behind Texas in terms of points scored during the season. ESPN analysts Mark May and Kirk Herbstreit declared, before the 2005 Rose Bowl had even been played, that the 2005 USC Trojans were the second best college football team of the past 50 years. May placed them behind only the 1995 Nebraska Cornhuskers; Herbstreit behind only the 2001 Miami Hurricanes. This led to Texas fans at the Rose Bowl mockingly chanting "Best ... Team ... Ever" during the post-game celebration. Stewart Mandell of Sports Illustrated observed, "ESPN spent the better part of Christmas season comparing that Trojans squad to some of the most acclaimed teams of all time only to find out that they weren't even the best team that season."

Texas' Rose Bowl win was the 800th victory in school history and it earned the Longhorns their fourth consensus national championship in football. Since the game, the media, coaches, and other commentators have heaped praise upon the Texas team, Young, and the Rose Bowl performance. Both the Rose Bowl win as well as the Longhorns' overall season have both been cited as standing among the greatest performances in college football history by observers such as College Football News, the Atlanta Journal-Constitution, Scout.com, Austin American-Statesman, and Sports Illustrated. ESPN awarded the two teams the 2006 ESPY Award for the "Best Game" in any sport.

Texas' win over USC was their ninth consecutive victory when facing a ranked opponent. Texas broke USC's winning streak (then the longest in the nation) at 34 and claimed the longest running winning streak for themselves at 20 wins in a row. Texas' 20-game winning streak was the second-longest winning streak in school history; Texas had 30 wins in a row from 1968 to 1970. Texas extended the winning streak to 21 before a September 9, 2006, loss to Ohio State University. In beating USC, Texas defeated a No. 1 ranked team for the first time since defeating Alabama in the Orange Bowl on January 1, 1965. The Longhorns ended the season ranked third in the all-time list of both total wins and winning percentage (.7143).

Rose Bowl – BCS National Championship Game: Texas Longhorns (12–0) vs. USC Trojans (12–0)

Quarter	1	2	3	4	Total
#2 Texas	0	16	7	18	41
#1 USC	7	3	14	14	38

at Rose Bowl • Pasadena, CA

- Date: Wednesday, January 4, 2006
- Game time: 7:00 PM CDT
- Game weather: Hazy, 68 °F (20 °C)
- Game attendance: 96,986
- Referee: David Witvoet
- TV announcers (ABC): Keith Jackson, Dan Fouts, Todd Harris, and Holly Rowe
- Box Score Recap

Game information

First Quarter

- (12:27) USC – LenDale White 4 yard run (Danelo kick), USC 7–0; 5 plays, 46 yards, 1:12

Second Quarter

- (10:38) UT – David Pino 46 yard field goal, USC 7–3; 9 plays, 52 yards, 4:02
- (4:57) UT – Selvin Young 12 yard run (Pino kick failed), UT 9–7; 7 plays, 80 yards, 1:53
- (2:34) UT – Ramonce Taylor 30 yard run (Pino kick), UT 16–7; 4 plays, 51 yards, 1:12
- (0:02) USC – Mario Danelo 43 yard field goal, UT 16–10; 11 plays, 54 yards, 2:32

Third Quarter

- (10:36) USC – LenDale White 2 yard run (Danelo kick), USC 17–16; 7 plays, 62 yards, 3:27
- (8:34) UT – Vince Young 14 yard run (Pino kick), UT 23–17; 7 plays, 80 yards, 2:02
- (4:07) USC – LenDale White 12 yard run (Danelo kick), USC 24–23; 9 plays, 74 yards, 4:27

Fourth Quarter

- (11:19) USC – Reggie Bush 26 yard run (Danelo kick), USC 31–23; 9 plays, 52 yards, 2:33
- (8:46) UT – David Pino 34 yard field goal, USC 31–26; 9 plays, 52 yards, 2:33
- (6:42) USC – Dwayne Jarrett 22 yard pass from Matt Leinart (Danelo kick), USC 38–26; 4 plays, 80 yards, 2:04
- (4:03) UT – Vince Young 17 yard run (Pino kick), USC 38–33; 8 plays, 69 yards, 2:39
- (0:19) UT – Vince Young 8 yard run (Young run), UT 41–38; 10 plays, 56 yards, 1:50

Statistics	TEX	USC
First downs	30	30
Total yards	556	574
Rushing: Att/Yds	36/289	41/209
Passing yards	267	365
Passing: Comp–Att–Int	30–40–0	29–41–1
Time of possession	28:00	32:00

Team	Category	Player	Statistics
Texas	Passing	Vince Young	30–40, 267 yards
Texas	Rushing	Vince Young	19 car, 200 yards, 3 TDs
Texas	Receiving	David Thomas	10 rec, 88 yards
USC	Passing	Matt Leinart	29–40, 365 yards, 1 TD, 1 INT
USC	Rushing	LenDale White	20 car, 124 yards, 3 TDs
USC	Receiving	Dwayne Jarrett	10 rec, 121 yards, 1 TD

== Rankings ==
Ranking movements Legend: ██ Increase in ranking ██ Decrease in ranking ( ) = First-place votes
	Week															
Poll	Pre	1	2	3	4	5	6	7	8	9	10	11	12	13	14	Final
AP	2 (4)	2 (4)	2 (8)	2 (8)	2 (6)	2 (6)	2 (7)	2 (8)	2 (10)	2 (8)	2 (8)	2 (9)	2 (14)	2 (10)	2 (9)	1 (65)
Coaches	2 (2)	2 (2)	2 (3)	2 (2)	2 (1)	2 (1)	2 (4)	2 (7)	2 (8)	2 (5)	2 (6)	2 (7)	2 (13)	2 (9)	2 (7)	1 (62)
Harris	Not released				2 (3)	2 (4)	2 (13)	2 (17)	2 (18)	2 (16)	2 (16)	2 (19)	2 (25)	2 (14)	2 (14)	Not released
BCS	Not released							2	1	2	2	2	2	2	2	Not released

The pre-season editions of the Associated Press Poll and USA Today Coaches Poll pre-season polls both ranked Texas number two in the nation behind defending National Champion University of Southern California. The two teams maintained those rankings throughout the entire 2005 regular season. Texas was ranked second in each week of the BCS rankings, except for one week where Texas took the top spot with USC falling to number two. The BCS rankings during 2005 were based on a formula which factored in the votes of two human polls (the USA Today coach's poll and the Harris Interactive poll), combined with a variety of computer rankings. The computer rankings favored Texas as the No. 1 team throughout the entire season, due partly to Texas's wins over ranked programs such as Ohio State University and Texas Tech University.

On October 24, 2005, Texas passed USC in the BCS rankings due to a strong showing in the computer rankings, which favored the Longhorns because of the overall strength of their opponents as well as the October 22, 2005, win over previously unbeaten Texas Tech. The first-place ranking was the first for UT in the BCS era, and the first top ranking in any major football poll since October 8, 1984, when they were atop both the Associated Press and Coaches polls. The 0.0007% margin separating Texas from USC was the slimmest margin between the top two teams since the inception of BCS rankings.

The stay at the top was short-lived. With the October 31, 2005, BCS rankings, Texas remained first in the computer rankings, with Virginia Tech pulling even with USC for number two in the computer rankings. However, USC remained atop both human polls and was able to reclaim the top overall ranking. Texas and USC won the rest of their games and faced each other in the National Championship, which Texas won 41–38. This was only the 35th meeting of the two top-ranked teams in the history of college football, including both regular season and bowl games. The BCS system now ensures that the two top teams in the BCS rankings face each other annually in a national championship game, but the methodology for ranking the teams remains controversial among fans and sportswriters.

The 2005 season marks only the eighth time in 50 years that exactly two teams have gone into the bowl season undefeated. This has been a major criticism of the BCS format, which does not use a playoff to determine the national championship. Unless there are exactly two unbeaten teams, both from BCS conferences, the choice of the top two teams can generate controversy. If more than two undefeated teams remain, then one or more of those teams must be left out. If one or fewer undefeated teams remain, then an opponent must be chosen from among the one-loss teams, meaning that other one-loss teams will be left out.

In the eight National Championship games through the 2006 Rose Bowl, the team ranked number one prior to the game has won five times, while the number two team has won three times. Up to the 2007 season, no school had won the BCS championship twice. In the final polls after the bowl games, Texas received all 62 first place votes in the Coaches Poll and all 65 first place votes in the AP Poll.

== After the season ==
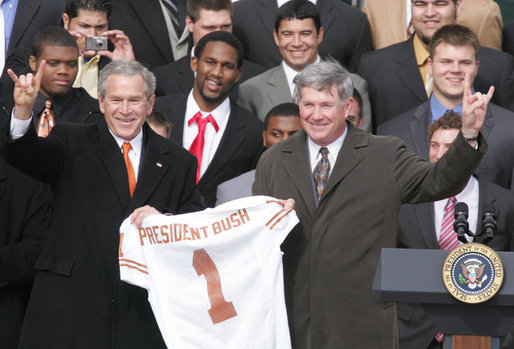
George W. Bush and Mack Brown give the Hook 'em Horns at the White House with the 2005 Texas Longhorn football team

Analysts labeled the team, their season, and their championship victory as the greatest or among the greatest in the history of the sport. College Football News judged the 2005 Longhorns to have played the greatest college football season ever. Sports-writers at College Football News also consider the 2006 Rose Bowl to be the best college football game ever played. Furman Bisher of the Atlanta Journal-Constitution said "if there ever has been a greater game, I never saw it, and I've been watching college football games since 1934." Scout.com called it "one of the best national title games ever", while Kevin Hench of Fox Sports called it "perhaps the greatest college football game ever played." ESPN declared the 2006 Rose Bowl Game an instant classic and re-aired it within a week of the original broadcast. ESPN later awarded the 2006 ESPY Award to the Longhorns and Trojans for the 2006 "Best Game" in any sport. Vince Young and Matt Leinart accepted the award on behalf of their teams. ESPN columnist Mark Schlabach ranked the 2005 Texas Longhorns as fourth-best among the first ten BCS-era champions.

The championship game drew attention from political figures. Head Coach Mack Brown took a congratulatory call from United States President George W. Bush, who told Brown, "Congratulations on a wonderful moment ... Tell the team congratulations, we're proud of them." White House Press Secretary Scott McClellan said Bush wished Brown and the Longhorns all the best, and said that he looked forward to having them visit the White House soon. Bush was formerly a governor of Texas and his daughter Jenna is a UT graduate. On February 14, 2006, Bush did host the team and coaches at the White House. California Governor Arnold Schwarzenegger lost a bet with Texas Governor Rick Perry on the outcome and had to send Perry a basket of "California wines, fruit and other goodies". The food was donated to National Guard troops in Texas. Both governors also offered autographed, handmade cowboy boots that were auctioned to benefit survivors of Hurricane Rita and Hurricane Katrina. Los Angeles Mayor Antonio Villaraigosa lost a bet with Austin Mayor Will Wynn and had to send a basket of produce, such as avocados, from a local farmers' market; Wynn had bet Texas' finest barbecue.

Seconds after Texas beat Southern California 41–38, the university lit the UT tower orange, the traditional signal of victory on the campus. Since this was a national championship, office lights were also left selectively lit in order to form a number "1" on all four sides of the tower (pictured). Texas students and fans spilled onto the streets of Austin and made their way to campus for an impromptu celebration. Though police were out in force, there were no reports of problems. The school commissioned a painting titled The University of Texas National Championship 2005 by Opie Otterstad to commemorate the win in the Rose Bowl and the National Championship.

Special editions of magazines and products featured the team. Dave Campbell's Texas Football put out a 45,000-copy special issue titled One for the Ages – Vince Young Leads Longhorns to the Fourth National Title. This issue included a column from Longhorn fan Matthew McConaughey as well as 15 pages of photos from the Rose Bowl. The cover featured Young kissing the "crystal football" national championship trophy. Sports Illustrated held up their regular weekly edition to await the results of the Rose Bowl. They finally went to press with a cover showing Young diving into the end zone with the label "Superman". Analysis inside the issue gave Young a large part of the credit for the win. They also printed a special commemorative issue in the state of Texas with Young on the cover, shouting in triumph amidst a storm of multi-colored confetti after winning the game. Features in the special edition included a story on Vince Young's Glory Days by Tim Layden, as well as a story dissecting How the Rose Bowl was won by Austin Murphy. The issue was on sale alongside the regular edition of the magazine. General Mills produced a commemorative issue Wheaties box featuring Mack Brown and a Texas Longhorns football helmet on the front. The commemorative packaging was sold nationwide. Texas is the first national college football champion to be featured since Nebraska was on the box in 1997.

Individual players and coaches also received honors. "Vince Young Day" was proclaimed by Mayor Bill White in Houston on January 10, 2006, to honor the Houston native. White said that Young is "an inspiration to all Houstonians, both young and old." On January 15, 2006, 51,244 Texas fans gathered in Darrell K. Royal – Texas Memorial Stadium to celebrate the team and their victorious season. Mack Brown was named the Paul "Bear" Bryant College Football Coach of the Year, as voted on by the National Sportscasters and Sportswriters Association. Brown became the first winner of the award from UT since Darrell Royal in 1963. The championship season lifted the reputation of Mack Brown and the offensive coordinator, Greg Davis. Davis was consistently criticized for over-conservative play-calling. After the championship win the criticism quieted down, but did not go away completely. As of 2007 sportswriters continue to debate whether Vince Young and the other talented UT players succeeded despite Davis or because of him.

Despite previous statements that he would return for his senior season, redshirt junior quarterback Vince Young announced that he would forgo his final year of NCAA eligibility and made himself eligible for the 2006 National Football League draft. The Tennessee Titans chose him as the third overall draft pick. Besides Young, five other Longhorns from this championship team joined professional teams through the 2006 NFL draft – Michael Huff (number 7 overall), Cedric Griffin (number 48 overall), David Thomas (number 86 overall), Jonathan Scott (number 141 overall) and Rodrique Wright (number 222 overall). As a result, fullback Ahmard Hall was re-united with his former teammate Vince Young in the NFL, playing for Tennessee. One year later, seven more members of this team were selected in the 2007 NFL draft – Michael Griffin (number 19 overall), Aaron Ross (number 20 overall), Justin Blalock (number 39 overall), Tim Crowder (number 56 overall), Brian Robison (number 102 overall), Tarell Brown (number 147 overall), Kasey Studdard (number 183 overall). Lyle Sendlein and Selvin Young were not drafted but signed with NFL teams as free agents. In the 2008 NFL draft, five more Longhorns from this team were selected: Limas Sweed (number 53rd overall), Jamaal Charles (number 73 overall), Jermichael Finley (number 91 overall), Tony Hills (number 130 overall), and Frank Okam (number 151 overall). In addition, Brandon Foster, Marcus Griffin, Nate Jones and Derek Lokey agreed to sign free-agent contracts with NFL teams.

For the fiscal year which ended in August 2005, just as the 2005 football season was starting, Texas was the nation's richest and most profitable football program, with revenue of $53.2 million, and a profit of $38.7 million. Following the national championship, for the 2005–2006 fiscal year, UT also led the nation in royalties from merchandise sales, setting a new national record at $8.2 million. These royalties went to the university as a whole, not specifically to the athletics programs. The team topped the merchandise rankings again for the 2006–2007 fiscal year.

The official website of UT football posted a special logo (pictured) proclaiming the Longhorns as the national champions. The logo featured the script "National Champions" centered prominently in the center, with "MACKBROWN-TEXASFOOTBALL.COM" in the lower left and "THE OFFICIAL SITE OF THE UNIVERSITY OF TEXAS LONGHORNS" in the lower right. In the background was an image of a rose, with a small Longhorn symbol appearing in front of the rose and between the two sections of the smaller print. In the upper right-hand side, the years "1963, 1969, 1970, 2005" appear, with the "2005" given special emphasis. These years correspond to the four consensus national championships won by the UT football team. The special logo was removed from the website's home page after a few months, but as of 2007 it is still found on certain portions of the site related to the 2005 season.

== List of accomplishments ==
Longhorn players from both the offense and defense set records for their performance during the season or received national recognition and awards.

- Vince Young won the Davey O'Brien Award, presented annually to the quarterback adjudged by the Davey O'Brien Foundation to be the best of all National Collegiate Athletic Association quarterbacks. Young also won the Maxwell Award, presented annually to the nation's top college football player as adjudged by a panel of sportscasters, sportswriters, and National Collegiate Athletic Association (NCAA) head coaches and the membership of the Maxwell Football Club. Furthermore, he won the Manning Award, the only quarterback award which takes into account the athlete's performance in the bowl season, as opposed to being awarded at the end of regular season play.
- Young had 1,050 rushing yards and 3,036 passing yards, making him the first player in NCAA Division I-A or I-AA history to rush for 1,000 yards and throw for 2,500 yards in a single season.
- In 2007, ESPN compiled a list of the top 100 plays in college football history; Vince Young's game-winning touchdown in the 2006 Rose Bowl ranked number 5.
- Michael Huff, Jonathan Scott, Rodrique Wright, and Vince Young were named to first team of the 2005 Associated Press All-American Team; Justin Blalock and Aaron Harris were named to the third team.
- Michael Huff won the Jim Thorpe Award, presented annually to the top defensive back in college football as adjudged by the Jim Thorpe Association.

The team also set school and NCAA records and received accolades.

- UT completed the ninth perfect season in the history of Longhorn football, and the first undefeated season since 1969.
- This season marked the first football championship by any university in Texas since the 1970 UT championship season.
- The Longhorns finished the season as the only unbeaten team in the nation, going 13–0 overall. Texas won 13 games in a season for the first time in school history. Only five teams have ever won more games (14) and posted a perfect record in a single NCAA Division I-A football season before the College Football Playoff: Ohio State in 2002, Alabama and Boise State in 2009, Auburn in 2010, and Florida State in 2013. Fourteen other teams have scored 13 wins in a season.
- With the conclusion of the 2005 season, UT posted five consecutive ten-win seasons and eight consecutive nine-win campaigns for the first time in school history (though seasons are generally longer than in the past).
- Texas' 652 points were an NCAA Division I record for points scored in a season (broken by the 716 points scored by the 2008 Oklahoma Sooners). The previous record was 624 points scored by Nebraska in 1983 (under NCAA rules, bowl game statistics count toward the total in 2005. Thus, all thirteen of Texas's games are counted in accumulating the 652 points. The 1983 Nebraska team scored 654 points, including its bowl game, but only its twelve regular season games are counted for statistics, thus the 624 total points). Their 50.2 points per game set a new school record.
- The Horns set two new school records for total yardage. The first was a new single-season total-yardage record with 6,657, passing the previous record of 5,709 set in 2003. Of the 6,657 yards, 556 yards were earned in the Rose Bowl. The second record was most total yards per game at 512.1. They also set a school single-season record for yards per rushing play with 5.9.
- In total yards per play, 2005 stands second on the UT record list with 7.07. The record for most yards per play is held by the 1993 team with 7.44.
- With 5 rushing touchdowns scored in the Rose Bowl, Texas scored 55 for the season, setting a new single-season school record. The old record of 52 touchdowns was set in 1969 and equaled in 1970.
- On January 25, 2006, the United States Senate bestowed another honor on the team when Senator Kay Bailey Hutchison presented Senate Resolution 352 commending the team for winning their fourth national championship.
