= Tony Hills (American football) =

American football player (born 1984)

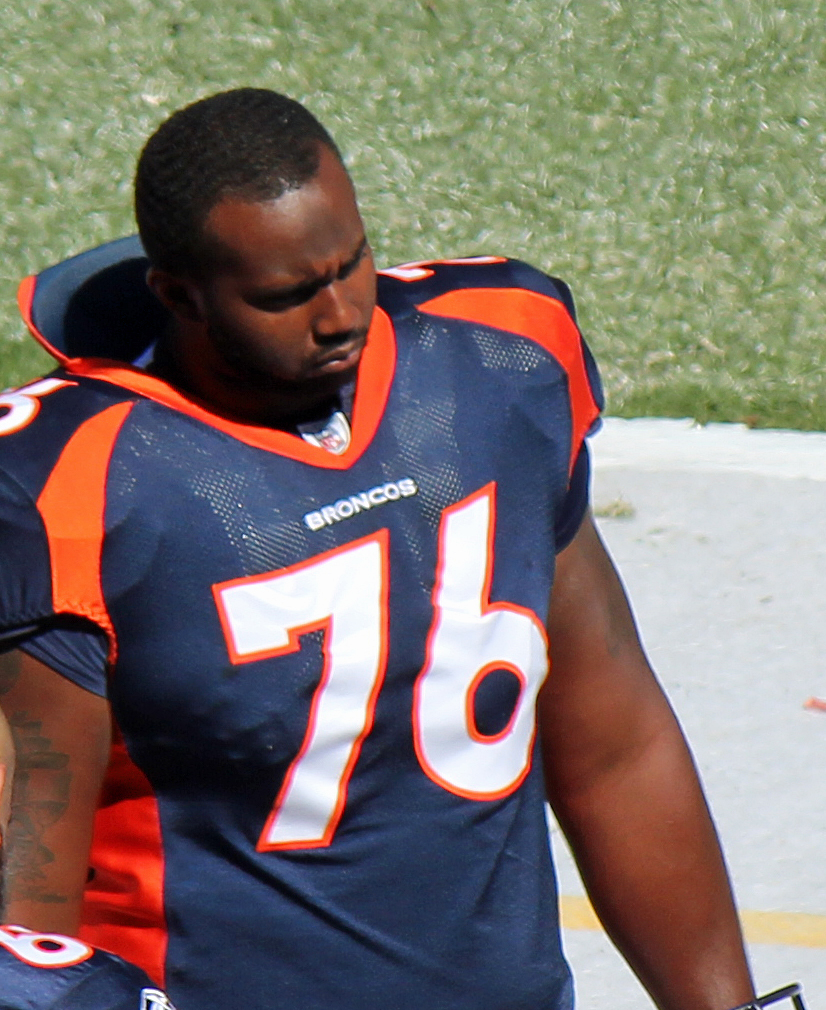
- Hills with the Denver Broncos in 2011

No. 66, 76, 78, 67
- Position: Offensive tackle

Personal information
- Born: November 4, 1984 (age 42); Dallas, Texas, U.S.
- Listed height: 6 ft 5 in (1.96 m)
- Listed weight: 304 lb (138 kg)

Career information
- High school: Alief Elsik (Houston, Texas)
- College: Texas
- NFL draft: 2008: 4th round, 130th overall pick

Career history
- Pittsburgh Steelers (2008−2010); Denver Broncos (2011); Indianapolis Colts (2012); Buffalo Bills (2013)*; Oakland Raiders (2013)*; Miami Dolphins (2014)*; Dallas Cowboys (2014); Carolina Panthers (2015)*; Baltimore Ravens (2015)*; New Orleans Saints (2015–2016); Detroit Lions (2017)*
- * Offseason or practice squad member only

Awards and highlights
- Super Bowl champion (XLIII); BCS national champion (2005); First-team All-American (2007); First-team All-Big 12 (2007); 2005 Rose Bowl champion; 2007 Holiday Bowl champion; 2006 Alamo Bowl champion

Career NFL statistics
- Games played: 32
- Games started: 1
- Stats at Pro Football Reference

Anthony Tremaine Hills (born November 4, 1984) is an American former professional football player who was an offensive tackle for nine years in the National Football League (NFL). He played college football for the Texas Longhorns. He won championships at both the collegiate and pro levels.

Hills was an All-American at Texas and won a national championship. He was selected by the Steelers in the fourth round of the 2008 NFL draft. He played six seasons with the Pittsburgh Steelers, Denver Broncos, Indianapolis Colts, Dallas Cowboys, and New Orleans Saints. He also spent time in training camp or on practice squads with the Buffalo Bills, Oakland Raiders, Miami Dolphins, Carolina Panthers, Baltimore Ravens, and Detroit Lions. He won Super Bowl XLIII with Pittsburgh and played in Super Bowl XLV with the same team.

== Early life ==
Though born in Dallas, Hills grew up in Houston, where he was an All-State tight end and Parade All-American at Alief Elsik High School. During Hills' senior year, he was rated by some scouting services as the top tight end prospect in the country, and he committed to play college football at Texas. His team reached the 5A state semifinals, but lost 30-21 to Converse Judson. During that game, Hills suffered a severe injury to his peroneal nerve and was told that he might not be able to play football again. He underwent two surgeries and lengthy rehabilitation before reporting to Texas (which was honoring his scholarship despite the injury) in spring 2004.

== College career ==
Hills attended the University of Texas, where he was forced to redshirt the 2003 season after reconstructive surgery on his left knee following a career-threatening injury (nerve damage). When he returned, he was moved from tight end to offensive tackle, and appeared in 31 games during his first three seasons (2004–2006). In 2005, he was part of the Longhorn team that won the National Championship. As a junior in 2006, Hills started at left tackle in all 13 games of the season. He started the Longhorns' first 11 games of 2007, but suffered a fractured left fibula that cost him the last two games. Nonetheless, that season he made the Walter Camp All-American team, was on the Outland Trophy watch list and was a first-team All-Big 12 selection. During his four years with the Longhorns, they won four straight bowl games, the 2004 and 2005 Rose Bowls, the 2006 Alamo Bowl and the 2007 Holiday Bowl.

== Professional career ==
=== Pre-draft ===
Hills was considered to be part of a strong group of offensive tackles and was seen by most analysts as a third-round pick.

=== Pittsburgh Steelers ===
Hills was selected by the Pittsburgh Steelers in the fourth round with the 130th pick.

Hills spent three seasons with the Steelers. He was with the team when they won Super Bowl XLIII, though he did not play in that game. He played in 4 games during the 2010 season and played in Super Bowl XLV. Prior to the start of the 2011 season, he was released by the Steelers.

=== Denver Broncos ===
On September 6, 2011, he signed with the Denver Broncos. He was only active for one game for the Broncos and was cut prior to the 2012 season.

=== Indianapolis Colts ===
A few weeks after being cut by the Broncos, he was signed to the Indianapolis Colts practice squad. On October 6, 2012, he was promoted to the roster. He played in 6 games for the Colts during the 2012 season and recorded the only start of his career.

=== Buffalo Bills ===
On July 28, 2013, Hills signed with the Buffalo Bills as a free agent, but was released by them a few weeks later.

=== Oakland Raiders ===
Two days after being cut by the Bills, on August 20, 2013, Hills was signed by the Oakland Raiders, but they cut him 11 days later.

=== Miami Dolphins ===
After sitting out the 2013 season, Hills was signed by the Miami Dolphins on July 28, 2014. He was moved to the practice squad before the season started. He was cut by the Dolphins in mid-October.

=== Dallas Cowboys ===
On October 15, 2014 Hills was signed by the Dallas Cowboys on the same day he was cut by the Dolphins. He played in 3 games for the Cowboys during the 2014 season.

=== Carolina Panthers ===
On July 28, 2015, Hills was signed by the Carolina Panthers as a free agent, but was cut by them before the season started.

=== Baltimore Ravens ===
A few weeks after being cut by the Panthers, Hills was signed by the Baltimore Ravens to their practice squad, but was released after 5 days. On September 21, 2015, he was waived by the Ravens.

=== New Orleans Saints ===
On October 6, 2015, shortly after being cut by the Ravens, Hills signed with the New Orleans Saints, his tenth team of his NFL career. Expected to be only a backup in his first game after signing, a nationally televised Thursday Night Football game against Atlanta, he ended up playing left tackle for most of the game after an injury to Saints rookie Andrus Peat. Hills ultimately played in 8 games for the Saints in 2015. He started the 2016 off-season as a free agent, but returned to the Saints on August 1, 2016. On September 3, 2016, he was released by the Saints. He re-signed on September 21, 2016 after an injury to P.J. Williams. His two years with the Saints were his most productive, appearing in 19 games, more than double with all other teams combined. At the end of the 2016 season he was asked to not re-sign.

=== Detroit Lions ===
On June 8, 2017, Hills signed with the Detroit Lions, his 11th team.

On July 31, 2017, Hills announced his retirement from the NFL.

== Personal life ==
Hills' younger brother Jeremy also attended Alief Elsik, and played running back at the University of Texas.
