= Bowie High School (Austin, Texas) =

James Bowie High School

Location
- 4103 W Slaughter Lane; Austin, Texas; United States; 30.187°N 97.856°W

Information
- Type: public
- Established: 1988; 38 years ago
- School district: Austin Independent School District
- Principal: Brad Lancaster
- Staff: 143.93 (FTE)
- Grades: 9–12
- Enrollment: 2,869 (2025–2026)
- Student to teacher ratio: 18,71
- Campus: 160 acres
- Colors: Black, Red, Silver
- Athletics conference: UIL Class 6A
- Mascot: Bulldogs
- Website: bowie.austinschools.org

James Bowie High School is a public high school in the southwest region of Austin, Texas. It is named after James Bowie, a prominent figure in Texan History who played a role in the Texas Revolution and gained recognition for his actions in the Battle of the Alamo. With 2,875 students, James Bowie High School is the largest school within the Austin Independent School District and the fourth largest secondary school in Central Texas. The school was established in 1988 on 60 acres (240,000 m^{2}) of land donated to the school district by Circle C Ranch, which again in 2011 donated 100 acres (400,000 m^{2}) for athletic purposes.

== Academics ==
Bowie was named a National Blue Ribbon School in 1992-93. Other awards include 2002 "Exemplary" School of Excellence by Texas Education Agency, 2002 "Gold Performance Acknowledgments" by Texas Education Agency, 2002 5 Star High School by Texas Monthly & National Center for Educational Accountability, and 2004 Recognized High School by Texas Education Agency. Children at Risk ranked Bowie the #8 public high school in Austin in 2012.

== Notable people ==
- Twins Marcus and Michael Griffin, former NFL players.
- Stephen Randolph, former MLB and NPB baseball player.
- Elijah Higgins, NFL tight end for the Arizona Cardinals
