= Marcus Griffin =

American football player (born 1985)

No. 35
- Position: Safety

Personal information
- Born: January 4, 1985 (age 41); Austin, Texas, U.S.
- Listed height: 5 ft 10 in (1.78 m)
- Listed weight: 201 lb (91 kg)

Career information
- High school: Austin (TX) Bowie
- College: Texas (2003–2007)
- NFL draft: 2008: undrafted

Career history
- Minnesota Vikings (2008)*
- * Offseason or practice squad member only

Awards and highlights
- BCS national champion (2005); First-team All-Big 12 (2007)

Marcus Kevin Griffin (born January 4, 1985) is an American former football safety. He played college football at the University of Texas and entered the 2008 NFL draft; however, he went unselected. Griffin was signed as an undrafted free agent by the Minnesota Vikings on April 28, 2008, but subsequently waived on June 30, 2008. He has a twin brother Michael, who played with him at Texas.

== Early life ==
Griffin attended Bowie High School where he was coached by Jeff Ables. As a senior, he earned Austin American-Statesman All-Central Texas honors as a defensive back and was first team All-district on both offense and defense. He made 82 tackles-including 62 solo, 3 interceptions, and 1 fumble recovery. He also played quarterback. As a quarterback he threw for 1028 yards and rushed for 560.

== College career ==
Griffin was a walk-on at UT in 2003. The 5th year strong safety had a great first year as a starter as he earned UT's Outstanding Defensive Newcomer Award. In all 5 years in college, he had 227 tackles, 6 interceptions and 91 yards.

Griffin started his career with the Longhorns as a redshirt freshman with the 2004 Texas Longhorns football team. That year, he played in all 12 games and made 10 tackles, including 7 on special teams.

In 2005, he played in all 13 games for the 2005 Texas Longhorns football team at free safety and on special teams and recorded 32 tackles.

In 2006, he appeared in 11 games for the 2006 Texas Longhorns football team, starting 10, all at strong safety. The two missed games were against Rice and Baylor and were due to injury. He was named a second-team Academic All-Big 12 honoree as well as UT's Outstanding Defensive Newcomer.

Griffin had a great 2007 senior season, in which he led the Longhorns in tackles (99) and interceptions (5).

== Personal ==
Marcus' twin brother, Michael Griffin, was also a defensive back at UT. Michael was a first rounder for the Tennessee Titans in the 2007 NFL draft. Their parents, Ronald and Mae, are both retired from the United States Armed Forces.
