= Richmond McGee =

American football player (born 1983)

No. 8
- Position: Punter

Personal information
- Born: April 25, 1983 (age 43); Garland, Texas, U.S.
- Listed height: 6 ft 4 in (1.93 m)
- Listed weight: 203 lb (92 kg)

Career information
- High school: Garland
- College: Texas
- NFL draft: 2006: undrafted

Career history
- Philadelphia Eagles (2008)*; Chicago Bears (2009–2010); Cleveland Browns (2011)
- * Offseason or practice squad member only

Awards and highlights
- National champion (2005)

Career NFL statistics
- Punts: 8
- Punt yards: 288
- Punting average: 36
- Stats at Pro Football Reference

Richmond McGee (born April 25, 1983) is an American former professional football player who was a punter in the National Football League (NFL). He was signed by the Philadelphia Eagles as a street free agent in 2008. He played college football for the Texas Longhorns.

He was also a member of the Chicago Bears and Cleveland Browns.

== Early life ==
McGee attended Garland High School in Garland, Texas and was a student and a letterman in football. In football, as a junior, he helped his team win the 1999 Texas 5A Division II State Championship team. Richmond McGee graduated from Garland High School in 2001.

== College career ==
McGee was a college football placekicker for the University of Texas Longhorns. He played four years for the team and handled at various times the punts, kickoffs, and field goals. He was the starting kicker for the Longhorn football team as they won the NCAA National Championship.

His primary duty was as a punter, but he also had experience as a placekicker. During 2003 he was the starting punter for the team, and also handled all the kick-offs.

As a member of the 2004 Texas Longhorns football team he made the only field goal he attempted. On the 2005 Texas Longhorns football team he made four successful kicks out of five attempts.

== Professional career ==
McGee was eligible for the 2006 NFL draft but was not selected.

=== Philadelphia Eagles ===
On April 16, 2008, the Philadelphia Eagles signed McGee to a three-year contract. He was waived on August 26.

=== Chicago Bears ===
McGee signed a one-year contract with the Chicago Bears on July 31, 2009. He was waived on August 31. He was re-signed on December 28 after an injury to punter Brad Maynard. He was waived again on August 4, 2010. He was re-signed to the team's practice squad on October 26, 2010. His contract was terminated on November 2, 2010. On February 18, 2011, the Bears signed McGee to a two-year deal. He was waived on August 1.

=== Cleveland Browns ===
McGee signed with the Cleveland Browns on August 3, 2011. He made his NFL regular season debut in the 2011 season opener against the Cincinnati Bengals, punting eight times for 288 yards (36 yard average). However, he suffered an injury during the game and was placed on injured reserve on September 13, 2011, after the Browns signed Brad Maynard. McGee was waived following the 2011 season on March 13, 2012.
