= Justin Zwick =

American football player (born 1983)

No. 12
- Position: Quarterback

Personal information
- Born: May 12, 1983 (age 43); Orrville, Ohio, U.S.
- Listed height: 6 ft 4 in (1.93 m)
- Listed weight: 225 lb (102 kg)

Career information
- High school: Massillon Washington (Massillon, Ohio)
- College: Ohio State
- NFL draft: 2007: undrafted

Career history
- Carolina Panthers (2007)*; Columbus Destroyers (2008)
- * Offseason or practice squad member only

Awards and highlights
- BCS national champion (2002)

Career AFL statistics
- Comp. / Att.: 1 / 1
- Passing yards: 47
- TD–INT: 1-0
- Passer rating: 158-33
- Total tackles: 1
- Stats at ArenaFan.com

Justin Zwick (born May 12, 1983) is an American former football quarterback who played college football for the Ohio State Buckeyes from 2002 to 2006. He played professionally with the Columbus Destroyers in the Arena Football League (AFL).

== Early life ==
Zwick played his freshman year of high school football at Orrville High School in Orrville, Ohio. While there, Zwick's team won a state championship his freshman year. Following his sophomore year, he transferred to Massillon Washington High School in Massillon, Ohio, where he also played basketball and ran track. While at Massillon, he played with future Buckeye teammate Devin Jordan. His senior year in Massillon was impressive, throwing for 3,821 yards and 40 touchdowns. His 110 career passing touchdowns puts him at third all-time in Ohio high school history, and at the time of his graduation, his 10,500 career passing yards was the state record. He also still holds the Massillon Tigers record for passing yards in a game - 407, vs. Javon Ringer led Chaminade-Julienne his senior year, and passing yards in a season - 3,281, also his senior year. He once held the record at Orrville High School for passing yards in a season, with 2,556 yards his sophomore year, but that has since been surpassed.

Zwick earned several accolades following his senior year, including a consensus All-Ohio selection, being named the Associated Press Co-Offensive Player of the Year, appearing on almost every All-American team, and garnering an Elite 11 invitation.

== College career ==
Zwick went to Ohio State as one of the highest rated quarterbacks in the nation coming out of high school. He was redshirted his freshman year, with Craig Krenzel and Scott McMullen already ahead of him at the quarterback position. Following the 2003 season, Zwick was expected by most to be the replacement to the departing Krenzel. He began the 2004 season, his sophomore year of eligibility, as the starter, and started the first six games of the year. During the game against Iowa, Zwick was forced to leave with an injury, opening the door for Troy Smith. Smith's exciting style of play kept him in the starting role, rendering Zwick to the backup position. He would return to the starter's role for the Alamo Bowl following Smith's suspension from the team, and led the Buckeyes to a dominating 33–7 victory over the Oklahoma State Cowboys. Zwick completed 17 of his 27 passing attempts for 189 yards in the bowl game.

The following season, controversy abounded in Columbus over which player should be the starting quarterback. Zwick started the season opener against Miami (OH), because Smith was still suspended, and the following game against Texas. Many fans feel that Ohio State lost that game because of their indecisiveness at the quarterback position, with Zwick and Smith subbing in and out for most of the game. After the loss against Texas, Smith was named the team's full-time starter. Zwick would appear in four more games that season, after the Buckeyes had comfortable leads and the games were well in hand.

== Professional career ==
Zwick got his first professional experience with the Indianapolis Colts, who invited him to mini-camp on a tryout basis. Zwick got an opportunity to work with his idol, Peyton Manning, but was not offered a contract following this chance. He was subsequently signed by the Carolina Panthers on June 11, 2007, between their mini-camp and training camp. However, he was released on July 9, prior to the start of training camp.

On February 9, 2008, the Columbus Destroyers of the Arena Football League signed Zwick to their roster. Several weeks later, the Destroyers announced intentions to move Zwick to the practice squad, but he was given an outright release on February 24. Just two days later, though, the team signed Zwick to play as the backup to starting quarterback Matt Nagy.

== Sources ==
- "Scout.com: Justin Zwick Profile." Retrieved August 3, 2006.
- (December 29, 2004). "2006 Alamo Bowl History." Retrieved August 3, 2006.
- (September 13, 2005)."Buck the Starter: Smith Replaces Zwick for Ohio State". Retrieved August 20, 2006.
- (April 4, 2006). "State Records: Football." Retrieved August 3, 2006.
