= Billy Pittman =

American football player (born 1984)

No. 5
- Position: Wide receiver

Personal information
- Born: September 19, 1984 (age 42); Cameron, Texas, U.S.
- Listed height: 6 ft 0 in (1.83 m)
- Listed weight: 200 lb (91 kg)

Career information
- College: Texas
- NFL draft: 2008: undrafted

Career history
- San Diego Chargers (2008)*
- * Offseason or practice squad member only

Awards and highlights
- BCS national champion (2005)

Billy Pittman (born September 19, 1984) is an American former football player. He played college football as a wide receiver for the University of Texas Longhorns from 2003 to 2007 and was the leading receiver on the 2005 Texas team that won the BCS National Championship.

== Early life ==
He attended C.H. Yoe High School in Cameron, Texas. He started at quarterback for the Yoemen for four years and accounted for 7,090 yards and 66 touchdowns during his prep career. In his senior year, Pittman was third-team 3A THSCA All-State and District 18-3A MVP. He once completed 13-of-19 passes for 223 yards and a touchdown and rushed 24 times for 267 yards and two touchdowns against Waco Connally.

== University of Texas ==
Pittman played college football at the University of Texas from 2003 to 2007. As a freshman in 2003, he sustained a torn quadriceps muscle and was a redshirt. In 2004, he missed the entire season after sustaining a separated shoulder, another torn leg muscle and being diagnosed with Bell's Palsy, a rare condition that results in inability to control facial muscles on the affected side and can also cause facial paralysis. In 2006, Stewart Mandell published a feature story in Sports Illustrated on Pittman's comeback from the rare disorder. Mandell described Pittman's discovery of his condition as follows:

"It started with a simple twitch. Billy Pittman woke up one spring morning two years ago to find his eye was twitching, and it wouldn't stop. Eye drops, a splash of water to the face -- no help. He went back to bed that afternoon, woke up, and now noticed his nostril wasn't moving. By the next morning, he couldn't feel the left side of his face."

Texas coach Mack Brown recalled that, after missing the 2003 and 2004 seasons, Pittman nearly quit the team: "That poor young man had everything that could possibly happen happen. He was ready to quit." After coming back from the condition, Pittman told a local reporter for the Associated Press, "I've come through a lot. What don't kill you will make you stronger."

Pittman was able to overcome the disorder and became the leading receiver on the 2005 Texas Longhorns football team that finished the regular season with a perfect record and defeated the USC Trojans for the BCS National Championship. During the 2005 campaign, Pittman became the favorite receiver for Texas quarterback Vince Young. In the second game of the season, Pittman helped the Longhorns defeat Ohio State in Columbus, Ohio. Pittman scored the first touchdown against the Buckeyes and gained 63 yards on a catch in the third quarter. He finished the game with five catches for 130 yards. He added a 64-yard touchdown catch against Oklahoma and a 75-yard catch against Texas Tech. Pittman caught 34 passes from Young in 2005 for 750 receiving yards, an average of 22.1 yards per catch, and five touchdowns.

Pittman had a second strong showing in 2006 with 35 catches for 456 yards and four touchdowns.

Pittman was suspended for the first three games of the 2007 season for "infringement of amateurism rules". According to Pittman, he drove a friend's car for the duration of this summer, which classifies as an improper benefit. In nine games for the Longhorns during the 2007 season, Pittman had 11 catches for 77 yards.

== Professional football ==
Pittman ran a relatively slow time of 4.76 seconds in the 40-yard dash at the NFL Combine. At Texas's Pro Day, he improved it slightly to that of 4.71 seconds and had a vertical leap of 32.5 inches. He was signed by the San Diego Chargers as an undrafted free agent on the 28 April 2008. Pittman was put on waivers at the end of August 2008 as the Chargers made cut the roster to 75 players.
