= Brandon Foster =

American gridiron football player (born 1984)

Profile
- Position: Cornerback

Personal information
- Born: December 25, 1984 (age 41); Dallas, Texas, U.S.
- Listed height: 5 ft 8 in (1.73 m)
- Listed weight: 185 lb (84 kg)

Career information
- High school: Bowie (Arlington, Texas)
- College: Texas
- NFL draft: 2008: undrafted

Career history
- Indianapolis Colts (2008–2009); Saskatchewan Roughriders (2010)*
- * Offseason or practice squad member only

Awards and highlights
- BCS national champion (2005); Second-team All-Big 12 (2007)

Brandon Foster (born December 25, 1984) is an American former professional football cornerback. He was signed by the Colts as an undrafted free agent in 2008. He played college football for the Texas Longhorns.

== Early life ==
Foster attended Bowie High School in Arlington, Texas and was a two-year starter. He was also and all-district selection as a senior with 42 tackles, 4 interceptions and two forced fumbles. He also was a 2003 state track champion as a member of the 4x100 and 4x200 relay team. The 4x100 meter recorded a time of 40.06 which was the 3rd fastest time in nation at the time.

== College career ==
Foster played 8 games as a redshirt freshman in 2004 and had two tackles. As a sophomore, he had 16 tackles in the 10th ranked defense. In 2006, he had 15 tackles and 4 interception in which he returned 2 for touchdown which tied as a UT record all in his first year as a starter. In 2007, he was named All-Big 12 Second-team with 4 interceptions. In all his four years, he had 106 tackles and 4 interceptions.

== Professional career ==
=== Indianapolis Colts ===
Foster was signed as a rookie free agent on May 2, 2008. He was released by the team during final cuts and re-signed to the practice squad on September 1. The Colts promoted him to the active roster on November 19 when cornerback Nick Graham was placed on injured reserve. Foster was waived on December 2 and re-signed to the practice squad a day later.

After finishing the season on the practice squad, Foster was re-signed to a future contract on January 5, 2009. He was waived on July 29, 2009.

=== Saskatchewan Roughriders ===
On March 24, 2010, Foster signed with the Saskatchewan Roughriders of the Canadian Football League.
