= 2011 University of Miami athletics scandal =

College sports scandal in the United States

The 2011 University of Miami athletics scandal was a University of Miami athletics scandal involving the university's football and men's basketball programs between 2002 and 2010.

As part of the scandal, these two University of Miami programs were investigated for alleged violations of National Collegiate Athletic Association (NCAA) rules violations, including improper benefits given by University of Miami booster Nevin Shapiro. The story was first reported by investigative reporters at Yahoo! Sports.

== Past scandals ==
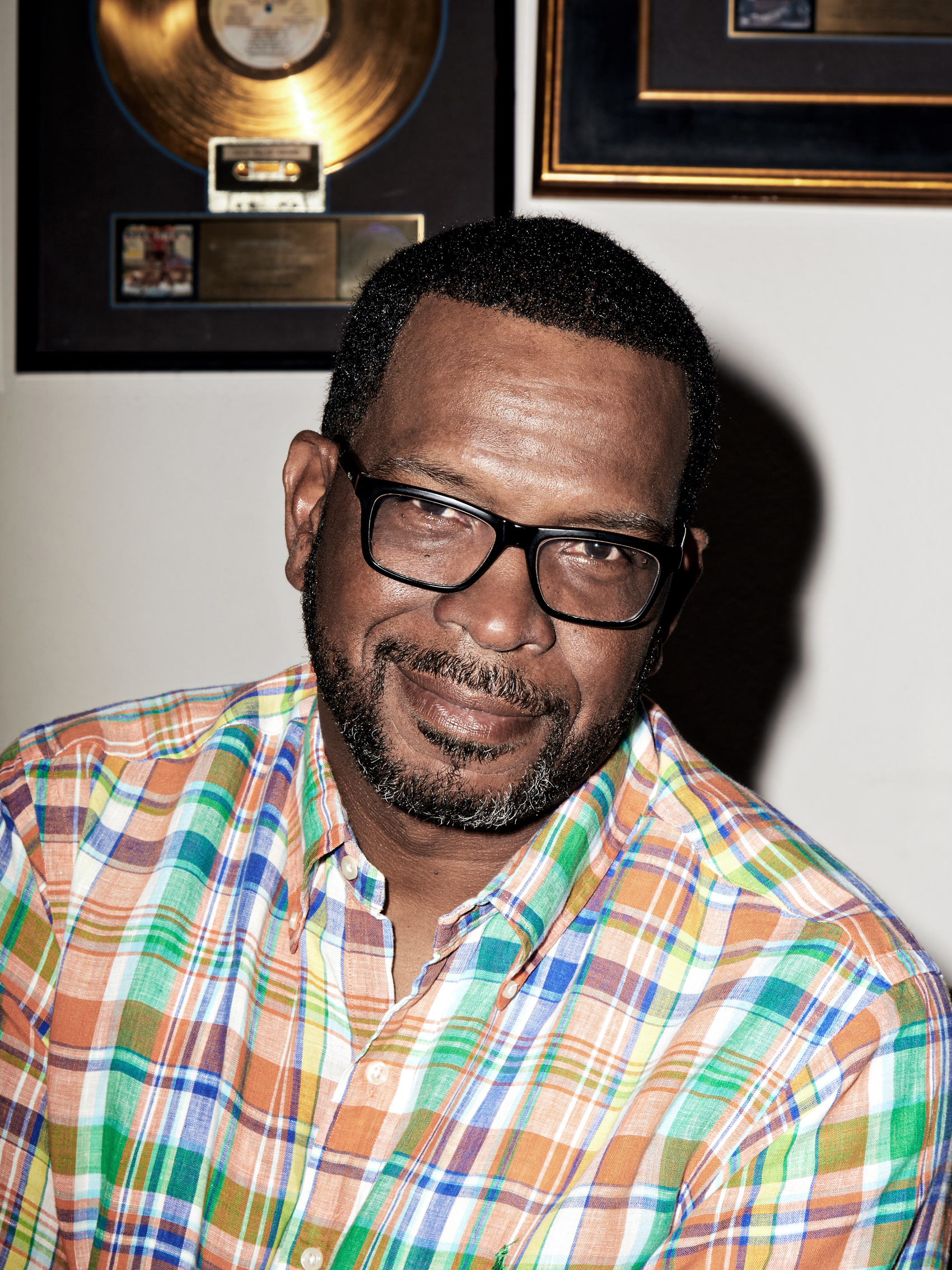
Rapper Uncle Luke of 2 Live Crew in May 2017

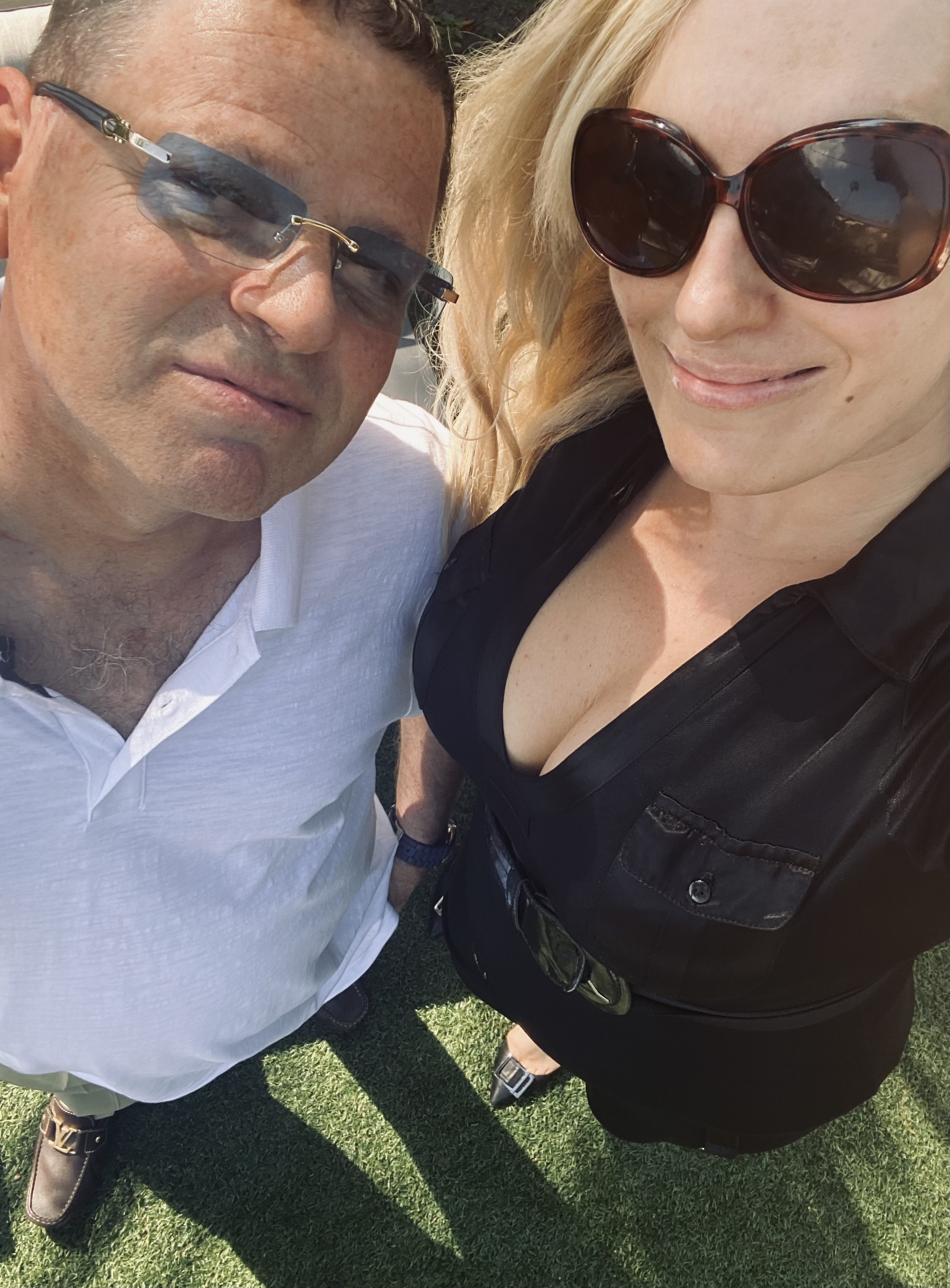
Nevin Shapiro (left) in August 2020

The University of Miami and its football team were the subject of a number of past scandals. In May 1994, The Miami Herald reported that 2 Live Crew member Uncle Luke and several NFL players had offered a pay-to-play scheme from 1986 through 1992, giving cash rewards to University Miami players for acts such as scoring touchdowns and big hits. This allegation was verified in a subsequent NCAA investigation, which also found that the University of Miami's "head football coach and the associate director of athletics for compliance and internal operations were aware" of the payments.

In 1994, former University of Miami academic advisor Tony Russell pleaded guilty to helping 57 football players and more than 23 other scholarship athletes falsify applications for Pell Grants. From 1989 to 1992, Russell had helped players receive more than $220,000 of fraudulent grants, which federal officials later called "perhaps the largest centralized fraud ever committed" against the Pell Grant program. As a result of the scandal, Alexander Wolff wrote a Sports Illustrated cover story suggesting Miami should temporarily shutter its football program and that athletic director Paul Dee should be fired.

In 1995, the NCAA announced that the University of Miami had provided or allowed "more than $412,000 of excessive aid" to student-athletes between 1990 and 1994, failed to implement its drug testing program, and lost institutional control over the football program. That December, the NCAA announced that the University of Miami's multiple infractions would result in severe sanctions, including a one-year ban from postseason play and a 31-scholarship reduction between 1996 and 1999. In addition to the football team, violations also involved the University of Miami's baseball, men's tennis, and women's golf teams.

== Nevin Shapiro ==
Much of the 2011 University of Miami athletics scandal involved acts by Nevin Shapiro, a University of Miami booster and fan. Some time between 1999 and 2003, under cover of a grocery business called Capitol Investments USA, Shapiro operated a $930 million Ponzi scheme, which eventually collapsed in November 2009. On April 21, 2010, Shapiro was charged in New Jersey with securities fraud and money laundering, and he pleaded guilty to one count of each on September 15, 2010. On June 7, 2011, he was sentenced to twenty years in federal prison and ordered to make $82,657,362.29 in restitution.

In 2002, Shapiro paid $1.5 million for thirty percent in a sports management company called Axcess Sports, which had been started by Michael Huyghue. The agency signed several University of Miami athletes, including Vince Wilfork. Shapiro was a major booster of the University of Miami's athletic programs, and reportedly spent $2 million from 2002 to 2010 in support of the football and men's basketball teams.

In August 2010, Shapiro told The Miami Herald that he was writing a book titled, The Real U: 2001 to 2010. Inside the Eye of the Hurricane in which he promised to tell how the University of Miami had violated NCAA rules involving more than 100 University of Miami players. "Once the players turned pro, they turned their back on me. It made me feel like a used friend," he said. The potential violations were also reported in an August 31, 2010 article by Marcus Session in Bleacher Report.

On August 16, 2011, Yahoo! Sports writer Charles Robinson published an article based on 100 hours of jailhouse interviews with Shapiro, detailing his allegations regarding his illegal and unethical behaviors and lack of oversight in the University of Miami athletics department.

== Allegations ==
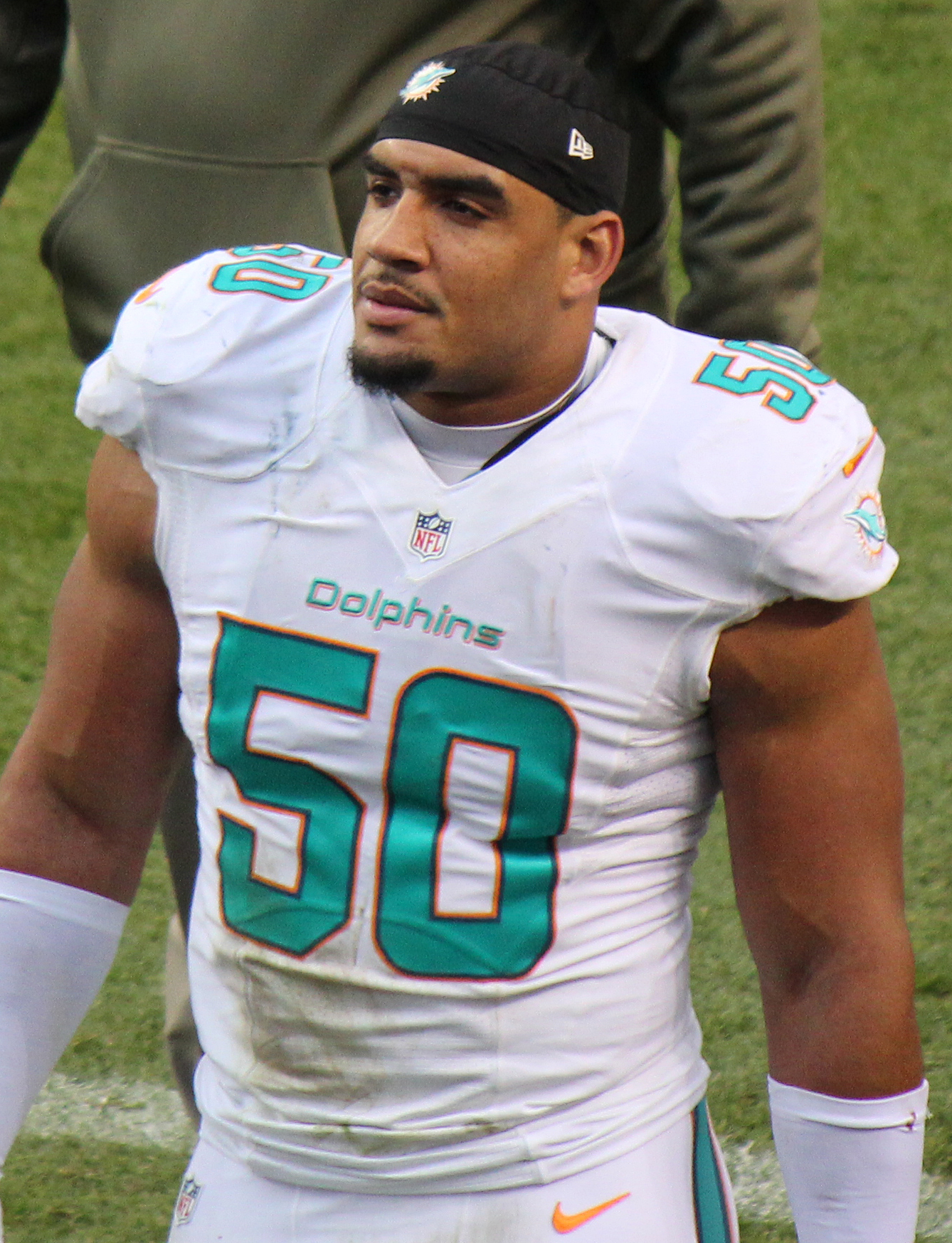
Olivier Vernon, suspended six games

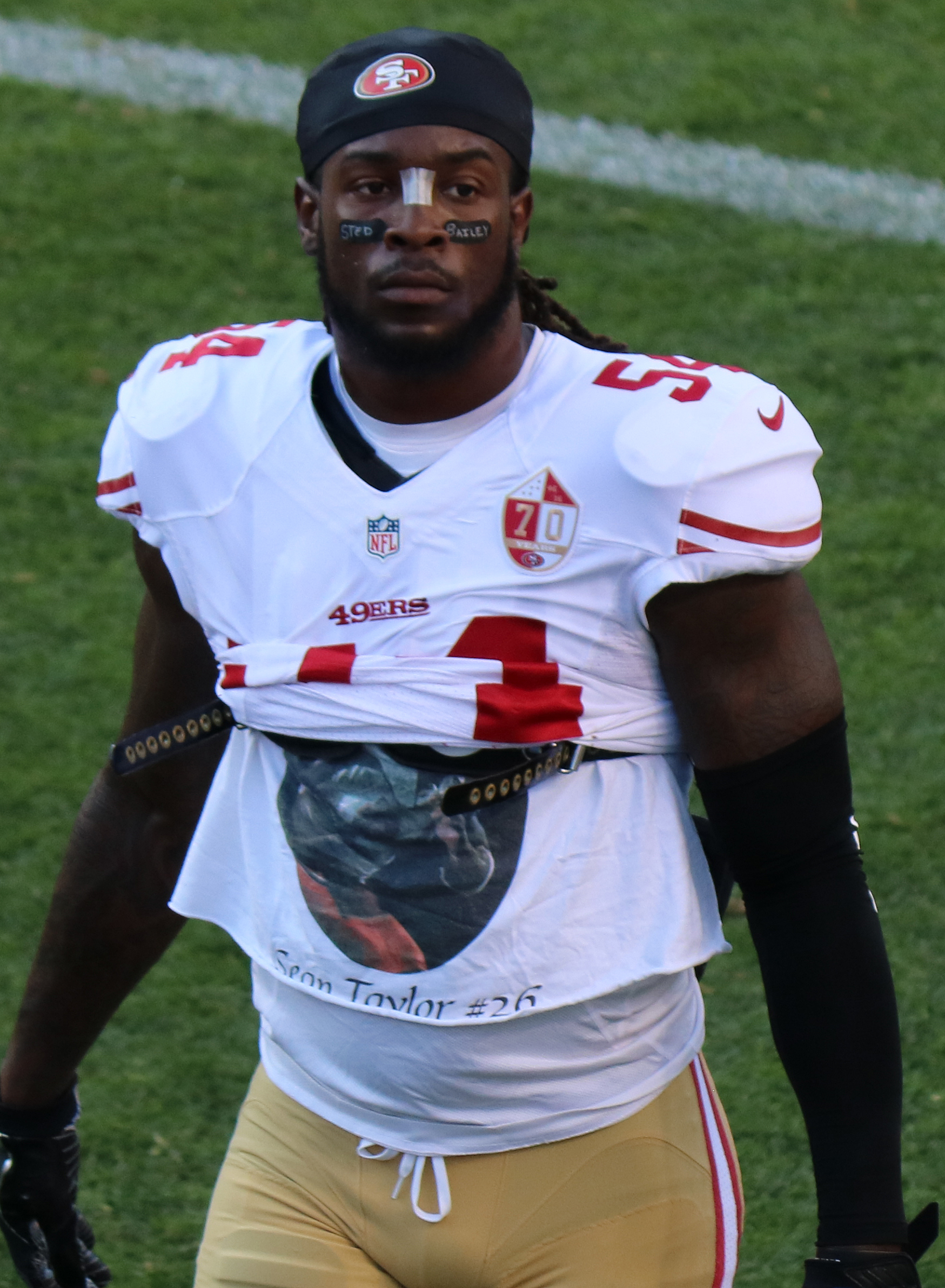
Ray-Ray Armstrong, suspended four games

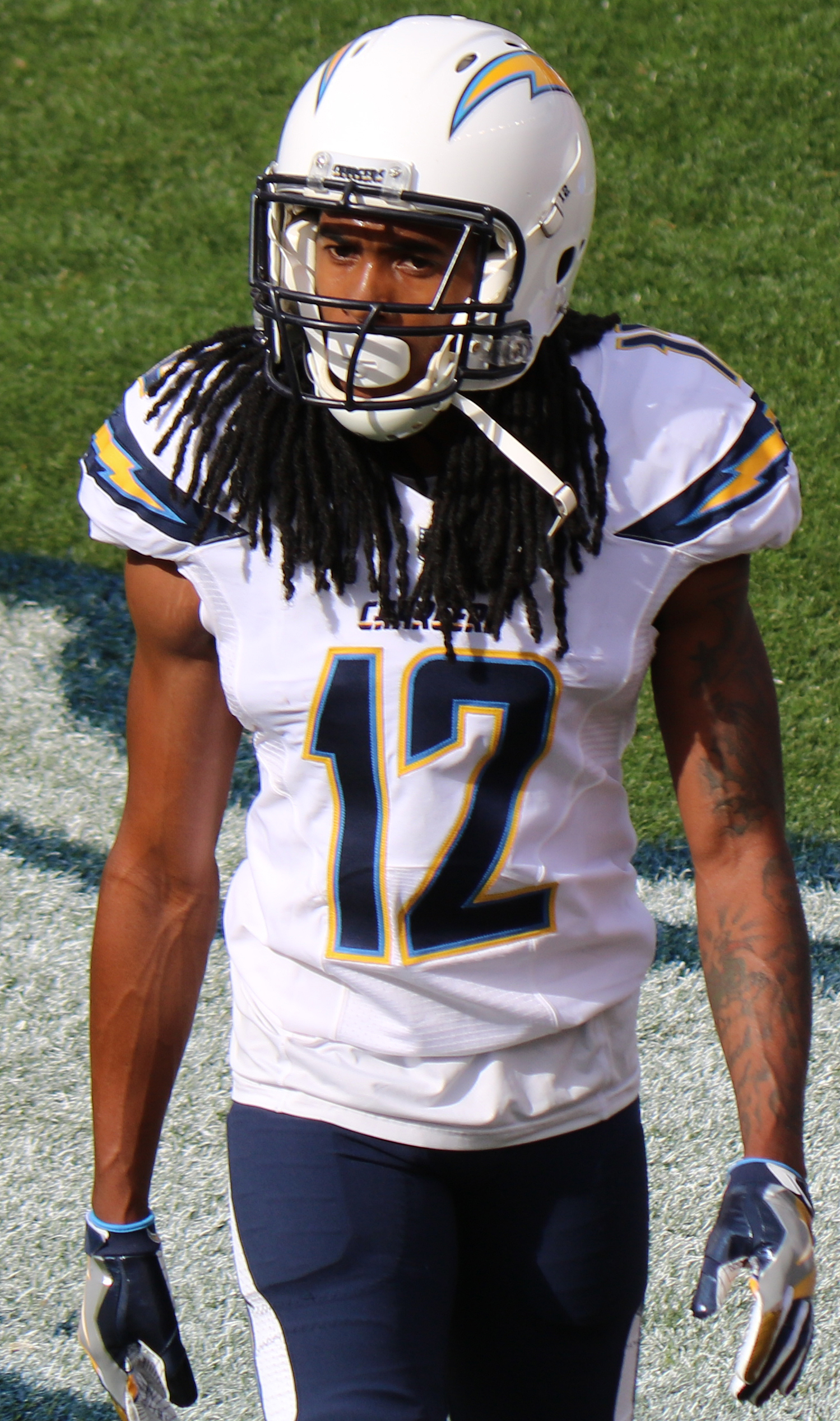
Travis Benjamin, suspended one game

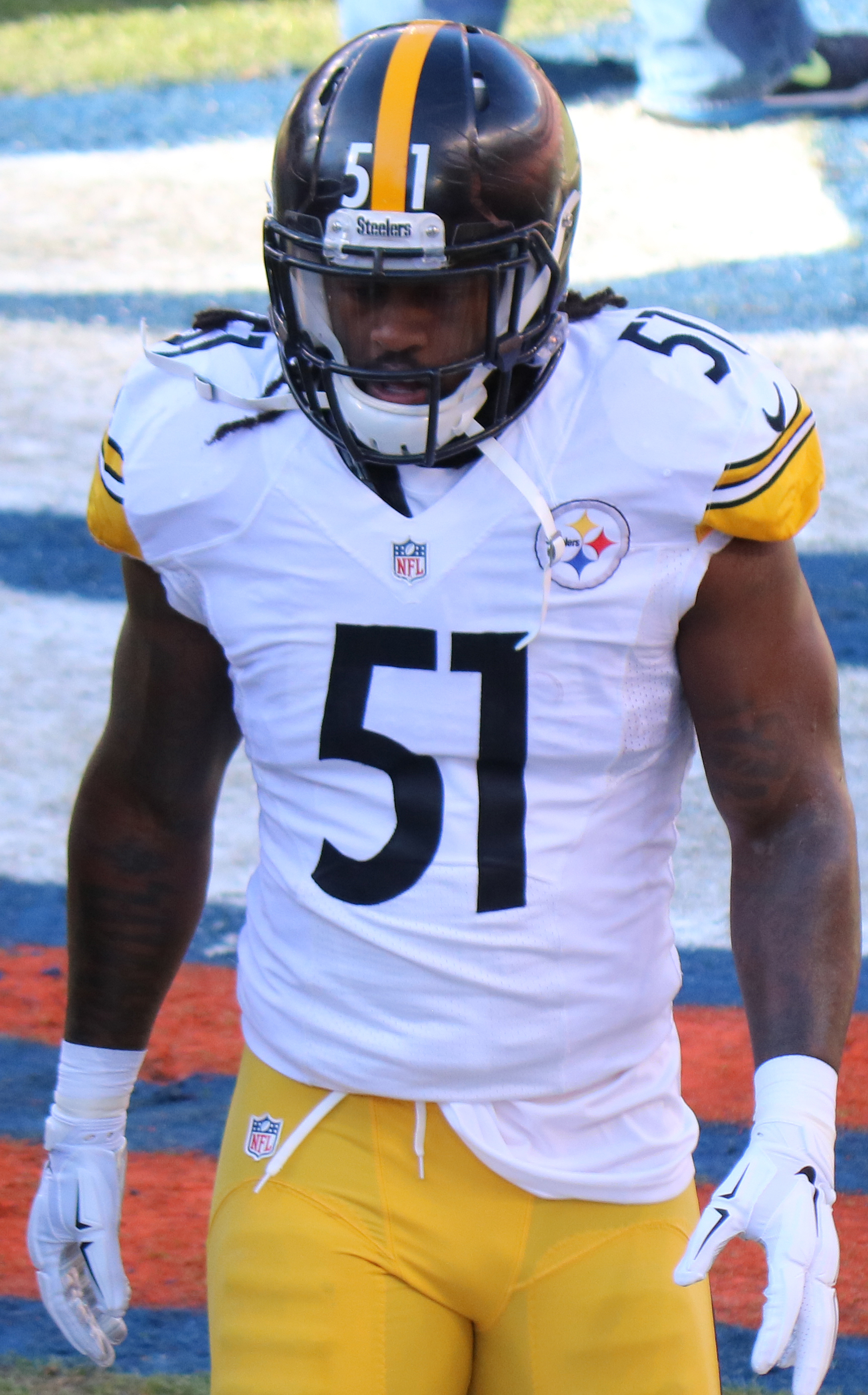
Sean Spence, suspended one game

Shapiro allegedly used investor funds to finance donations to the University of Miami's athletic program and claimed that he gave an estimated $2 million in prohibited benefits to at least 72 current or former University of Miami football and basketball players and coaches from 2002 to 2010. Yahoo! Sports alleged that Shapiro, through his donations, violated at least four major NCAA bylaws:

- Bylaw 11, involving impermissible compensation to coaches;
- Bylaw 12, involving amateurism of athletes;
- Bylaw 13, involving improper recruiting activity; and
- Bylaw 16, involving extra benefits to athletes.

Shapiro saw his involvement as a direct continuation of Luther Campbell, telling Yahoo! Sports, "Here’s the thing: Luther Campbell was the first uncle who took care of players before I got going. His role was diminished by the NCAA and the school, and someone needed to pick up that mantle. That someone was me. He was 'Uncle Luke', and I became 'Little Luke'."

If they're found to be true, it appears we've had a third-party individual have a really pernicious impact on a huge cross-section of student-athletes. The breadth of that would be pretty shocking. --NCAA president Mark Emmert, August 24, 2011

=== NCAA sanctions on players ===
On August 25, 2011, media reports indicated that the University of Miami had declared as many as thirteen current football players ineligible, including projected starting quarterback Jacory Harris, as a result of the investigation. The University of Miami then petitioned the NCAA for reinstatement of at least some of the players involved. The following day, head coach Al Golden confirmed these reports, though did not name any players or indicate the number of reinstatements sought. The University of Miami began the process in hopes that the NCAA would make its decisions on all players before their season opener at Maryland on September 5, 2011.

On August 30, 2011, the NCAA announced results of the University of Miami's petition, clearing one named player, Marcus Robinson, but finding that the other twelve had received impermissible benefits. All of these players were suspended from play until they made restitution. Four found to have received less than $100 were not suspended and were eligible to play once certified as having completed restitution requirements. In total, University of Miami players repaid about $4,000 in restitution with the greatest single amount being $1,200.

The three who drew the longest suspensions accepted gifts from Shapiro during their recruitment and had received the greatest amount of improper benefits among the group. The NCAA announced the following penalties on University of Miami players implicated in the scandal:

- One game suspension: Travis Benjamin, Marcus Forston, Jacory Harris, Adewale Ojomo, and Sean Spence
- Four game suspension: Ray-Ray Armstrong and Dyron Dye
- Six game suspension: Olivier Vernon

=== NCAA sanctions on coaches ===
On October 22, 2013, the NCAA announced its sanctions against the University of Miami and four former coaches, alleging "a lack of institutional control in the poorly monitored activities of a major booster, the men's basketball and football coaching staffs, student-athletes and prospects."

The NCAA sanctions included three years of probation for the entire University of Miami athletic program, an end to the post season ban on the University of Miami football team, the loss of nine football scholarships over the 2014, 2015, and 2016 seasons, prohibiting players on unofficial visits from receiving more than one complimentary ticket to University of Miami home football games in 2014 and 2015, the loss of one men's basketball scholarship for the 2014–15, 2015–16, and 2016–17 seasons, suspension of men's basketball coach Frank Haith for the first five games of the 2013–14 season, and a two-year show-cause penalty for three University of Miami assistant coaches Aubrey Hill (football), Clint Hurtt (football), and Jorge Fernández (men's basketball).

=== Reactions ===
Due to the nature of the allegations and the prominence of the University of Miami football program team and the history of scandals surrounding the program, reactions to the expose were rapid. Paul Dee, who served as University of Miami athletic director from 1993 through 2008, a period including both the current scandal and violations uncovered from 1995, was a recipient of heavy criticism. Sports Illustrated's Stewart Mandel described Dee's involvement as follows:

Dee, you may recall, was the Committee on Infractions chairman for USC's much-publicized case last summer involving former stars Reggie Bush and O. J. Mayo. It was Dee who, in announcing some of the stiffest penalties of the last 20 years (a two-year bowl ban and 30 docked scholarships), closed with the preachy reminder that "high-profile athletes demand high-profile compliance". Dee, Miami's AD during most of the period covering Shapiro's allegations, is retired and no longer under NCAA jurisdiction. Still, it seems only fair he should spend a day at USC's Heritage Hall wearing a sandwich board with the word "Hypocrite."

According to NCAA president Mark Emmert, the NCAA began investigating the University of Miami football program "four or five months" prior to media coverage of the scandal, and NCAA investigators conducted multiple interviews with Shapiro. Many sportswriters, including Charles Robinson and Dan Wetzel of Yahoo! Sports, speculated that if the allegations were found to be true, that the University of Miami could face the NCAA's "death penalty," which was last given to a major program in 1987 when Southern Methodist University's football season was cancelled.

On November 20, 2011, the University of Miami announced that it was withdrawing from bowl consideration for the 2011 season due to the ongoing NCAA probe. In 2012, with the NCAA yet to announce its findings as the end of the 2012 season approached, the University of Miami again chose to withdraw from postseason play, giving up a berth in the ACC Championship Game.

On February 19, 2013, the University of Miami received a notice of allegations from the NCAA.
