= University of Southern California athletics scandal =

2010 college sports scandal

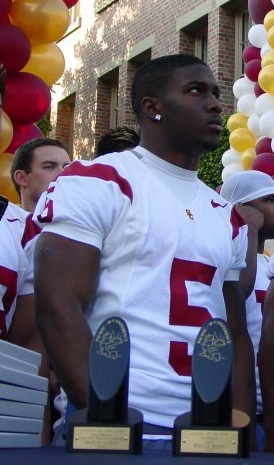
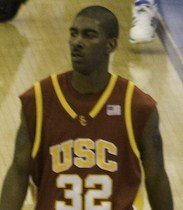
Reggie Bush (left) and O. J. Mayo (right), who played football and basketball, respectively, for the University of Southern California (USC) Trojans, were accused of receiving improper benefits by the NCAA.

In the University of Southern California athletics scandal, the University of Southern California (USC) was investigated and punished for NCAA rules violations in the Trojan football, men's basketball and women's tennis programs.

The sanctions were announced on June 10, 2010, and affected the USC football program from 2010 to 2012. Sanctions for the football team included postseason bans (2 years), scholarship losses (3 years), vacating old games (including a BCS Championship game), and disassociating with Reggie Bush. Separately, Bush returned his Heisman Trophy. USC head coach Pete Carroll also left USC shortly before sanctions were announced.

== Background ==
In 2006, reports surfaced raising questions about whether football star and 2005 Heisman Trophy winner Reggie Bush's family received gifts in violation of NCAA policies. The school requested that the conference investigate the matter, and Bush denied any impropriety. Sports agent Lloyd Lake sued Bush and his family in November 2007 in an effort to recoup $291,600 in cash and gifts. Lake also agreed to cooperate with the NCAA.

On May 11, 2008, ESPN reported that a former "confidant", Louis Johnson, revealed on ESPN's TV show Outside the Lines that basketball star O.J. Mayo received numerous gifts in violation of NCAA rules. The report stated that Mayo received the gifts from Rodney Guillory before and during his tenure at USC. Guillory is said to have received the money from the Bill Duffy Associates Sports Management (BDA).

In April 2009, the Los Angeles Times reported that the NCAA had merged its investigations of Bush and Mayo into a single probe of the Trojans athletic programs. On December 28, 2009, it was announced that Bush had lost his bid for confidential arbitration in this matter and that the case would proceed to trial.

On January 3, 2010, USC announced that it had retroactively determined Mayo was ineligible for the 2007–2008 season. It concluded Mayo forfeited his amateur status before ever playing a game for USC by receiving improper benefits. As a result, USC vacated all 21 of its wins from the 2007–08 season, dropping its record to 0–12. A vacated game does not count as a win for the other team, but is officially treated as having never happened. USC also withdrew from postseason consideration (including the Pac-10 conference tournament) for the 2009–10 season.

The case was settled in April 2010. Probes by both USC and the NCAA found that Bush and Mayo had effectively forfeited their amateur status (in Mayo's case, before he ever played a game for USC) by accepting gifts from agents. In addition, the women's tennis team was cited in the report for unauthorized phone calls made by a former player. As a result of the ongoing investigation, which progressed well into the 2010–11 seasons for both USC and Reggie Bush's New Orleans Saints, Bush voluntarily gave up his 2005 Heisman Trophy, which the Heisman Trust decided to leave vacant.

== Punishment ==
As a result of sanctions issued by both USC and the NCAA, the Trojan athletic program received some of the harshest penalties ever meted out to a Division 1 program. The football team was forced to vacate the final two wins of its 2004 national championship season, as well as all of its wins in 2005. It was also banned from bowl games in both 2010 and 2011 and was docked 30 scholarships over three years. The basketball team gave up all of its wins from the 2007-08 season and sat out postseason play in 2010. The NCAA accepted USC's earlier elimination of its women's tennis wins between November 2006 and May 2009 and did not sanction the team further.

In announcing the penalties, the NCAA faulted USC for not invested more effort in monitoring Bush's relationships, given his high-profile status. NCAA infractions committee chairman Paul Dee said, "High-profile players merit high-profile enforcement."

Shortly after the NCAA handed out its penalties, the Football Writers Association of America announced it would no longer recognize the Trojans as its 2004 national champion. In June 2011, the Bowl Championship Series stripped the Trojans of the 2004 BCS title and declared that there would be no winner of the 2004 BCS, though the Associated Press still recognizes the Trojans as its national champions for 2004.

Bush was the first person in the Heisman Trophy's history to give his trophy back to the Heisman Trust (albeit voluntarily), and the 2005 season was the only one in the award's history for which there is officially no winner before the trophy was returned to him.

== Criticism of sanctions ==
These sanctions have been criticized by some NCAA football writers, including ESPN's Ted Miller, who wrote, "It's become an accepted fact among informed college football observers that the NCAA sanctions against USC were a travesty of justice, and the NCAA's refusal to revisit that travesty are a massive act of cowardice on the part of the organization."

Miller also suggested that the sanctions had more to do with objections to the football culture at USC than its alleged noncompliance with NCAA rules:

During a flight delay last year, I was cornered at an airport by an administrator from a major program outside the Pac-12. He made fun of me as a "USC fanboy" because of my rants against the NCAA ruling against the Trojans. But we started talking. Turned out he agreed with just about all my points. (He just didn't like USC.)

He told me, after some small talk and off-the-record, that "everybody" thought USC got screwed. He said that he thought the NCAA was trying to scare everyone with the ruling, but subsequent major violations cases put it in a pickle.

Then he told me that USC was punished for its "USC-ness," that while many teams had closed down access — to media, to fans, etc. — USC under Pete Carroll was completely open, and that was widely resented. There was a widespread belief the national media fawned on USC because of this. Further, more than a few schools thought that the presence of big-time celebrities, such as Snoop Dogg and Will Ferrell, at practices and at games constituted an unfair recruiting advantage for the Trojans.

It wasn't against the rules, but everyone hated it. This, as he assessed his own smell test, was a subtext of the so-called atmosphere of noncompliance that the NCAA referred to — an atmosphere that oddly yielded very few instances of noncompliance around the football program even after a four-year NCAA investigation.

In February 2014, in a talk on the campus of USC, former coach and recent Super Bowl winner Pete Carroll said about the sanctions, "I thought (the NCAA's investigation into USC) was dealt with poorly and very irrationally and done with way too much emotion instead of facts. I sat in the meetings. I listened to the people talk. I listened to the venom that they had for our program... They tried to make it out like it was something else. They made a terrible error."

=== Comparison with later scandals ===
Further criticism of the sanctions came during later NCAA's investigations into other programs such as the University of Miami and University of Oregon for recruiting violations, all of which led to substantially more lenient punishments than USC's for arguably greater offenses. This has led many people to think that the NCAA's sanctions of USC were intended to make an example out of the school to other programs that the NCAA hasn't followed through on with other college programs.

Most notable of these scandals was that against Miami, given Dee's involvement and his argument that "high-profile athletes demand high-profile compliance." Accusations later came out that, while Dee was athletic director there, Miami's football program had been flagged for major improper benefits, specifically from university booster Nevin Shapiro from 2002 until 2010. Writers noted the hypocrisy of Miami's more lenient punishment (loss of nine scholarships and three years) compared to USC's, despite Miami committing more serious infractions through university employees over a longer time. One writer stated: "it seems only fair [Dee] should spend a day at USC's Heritage Hall wearing a sandwich board with the word 'Hypocrite.'"

In 2014, USC's sanctions once again became a talking point because of the Penn State child sex abuse scandal. Sanctions against Penn State, which included a four-year bowl ban and forty lost scholarships, were significantly reduced after two years. USC petitioned the NCAA for similar leniency but was denied, the NCAA finding the situations to be distinguishable. This incident led to more outcry over the inconsistency of punishment by the NCAA, and its seeming bias against USC.

== Todd McNair lawsuit against the NCAA ==
Todd McNair, a running backs assistant coach at USC, sued the NCAA in June 2011, claiming that the NCAA's investigation was one-sided and his future earnings were impaired by its report on the scandal that led to sanctions against USC. The NCAA determined McNair lied about knowing about some of the gifts to Bush's family.

On November 21, 2012, Los Angeles Superior Court Judge Frederick Shaller ruled that the NCAA was "malicious" in its investigation of McNair. In his ruling, the Judge stated that e-mails between an investigative committee member, an NCAA worker, and a person who works in the agency's appeals division "tend to show ill will or hatred" toward McNair. In an e-mail, one staffer called McNair "a lying morally bankrupt criminal, in my view, and a hypocrite of the highest order." Judge Shaller said he would unseal the entire inquiry into McNair in December. "I understand [why] the NCAA wants to keep this quiet," the Judge said. "But I'm not going to seal the record... I know you guys are going to appeal it but from my part.. There's no reason to seal it. I think the public has a right to know."

However, on 19 December 2012, the NCAA requested and was granted a stay of Judge Shaller's order to unseal the files, much of which contain e-mails from NCAA staff personnel and committee members to one another. As a result of the stay, files regarding the NCAA's investigation into USC remained sealed until the California Appellate Court ruled on the NCAA's appeal.

In February 2015, the California appellate court ruled that the NCAA cannot seal the estimated 400 pages of material regarding McNair's defamation lawsuit. The NCAA may petition the appellate court for a rehearing as well as take the matter to the California Supreme Court.

In July 2021, McNair and the NCAA settled the lawsuit through mediation. Financial terms of the settlement were not disclosed.

== Reinstatement of Bush's Heisman Trophy ==
On June 9, 2020, USC announced they would be ending their disassociation with Bush following the conclusion of the NCAA's mandated 10-year span. After the NCAA ruled to allow players to make money from their name, image, and likeness (NIL) on June 30, 2021, Bush began advocating for the reinstatement of his Heisman Trophy and USC records. He reached out to the NCAA and the Heisman Trust president Michael Comerford, but received a call from Rob Whalen, the executive director stating that Comerford would not be corresponding with them. On July 2, the Heisman Trust issued a statement saying that the award would be returned to Bush if the NCAA reinstated his 2005 status at USC. On July 28, a statement issued by the NCAA said that no previous infractions would be re-evaluated, as the updated NIL rules continued to prohibit “pay-for-play type arrangements.”

In April 2023, billboards began appearing in the Los Angeles area demanding the return of Bush's Heisman. On August 14, 2023, attorneys representing USC and Bush submitted a petition to the NCAA Committee on Infractions, asking them to review their 2010 case and reconsider their decision. On August 23, Bush announced that he was filing a defamation lawsuit against the NCAA. The lawsuit alleges that their use of the phrase “pay-for-play” in their July 2021 statement was a false claim directed at him that, consequently, damaged his reputation. The purpose of this lawsuit was to help him achieve his goal of reacquiring his trophy. Former Heisman winners Eddie George and Johnny Manziel voiced their support of Bush, with the latter announcing that he would boycott all future Heisman ceremonies until Bush would be allowed to stand on stage with him.

On April 24, 2024, the Heisman Trust announced it would return the Heisman Trophy to Bush, citing "enormous changes in the college football landscape". Among the changes cited, were changes to the NCAA's NIL payment policy and the U.S. Supreme Court's 2021 decision that questioned the legality of the NCAA's amateurism model. USC also restored Bush's banner at the Los Angeles Memorial Coliseum and retired his number alongside the school's other Heisman winners. Bush said in a statement: "I am grateful to once again be recognized as the recipient of the Heisman Trophy. This reinstatement is not only a personal victory, but also a validation of the tireless efforts of my supporters and advocates who have stood by me throughout this arduous journey".

== See also ==
- Ohio State University football scandal
- University of Michigan basketball scandal
- University of Minnesota basketball scandal
- 2015 University of Louisville basketball sex scandal
