= Yahoo Sports =

Sports news website

Yahoo! Sports
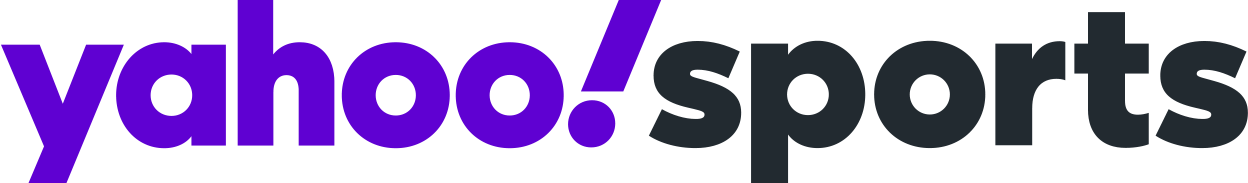

- Yahoo Sports Homepage
- Website type: Sports
- Owner: Yahoo Inc.
- Creator: Yahoo!
- Website: sports.yahoo.com
- Launched: December 8, 1997; 28 years ago
- Current status: Active

Yahoo! Sports is a sports news website launched by Yahoo! on December 8, 1997. It receives a majority of its information from Stats Perform. It employs numerous writers, and has team pages for teams in almost every North American major sport. Before the launch of Yahoo Sports, certain elements of the site were known as Yahoo! Scoreboard.

From 2011 to 2016, the Yahoo Sports brand had also been used for a US sports radio network. That network is now known as SportsMap.

== Sports covered ==
The United States edition of Yahoo Sports covers many sports, including WWE, NFL, MLB, NBA, NHL, college football, college basketball, NASCAR, golf, tennis, FIFA World Cup, UEFA Champions League, Premier League, arena football, boxing, CFL, cycling, IndyCar, Major League Soccer, motorsport, Olympics, NCAA baseball, NCAA ice hockey, NCAA women's basketball, WNBA, alpine skiing World Cup, track & field, cricket (UK), figure skating, rugby (UK), swimming, mixed martial arts, and horse racing. Yahoo Sports also previously covered the now defunct ABL and WUSA.

== Writers ==
Yahoo Sports employs many reporters, including Dan Wetzel.

== Key dates in Yahoo Sports ==
- December 8, 1997: Yahoo Sports is launched.
- January 17, 2003: Yahoo Sports launched the first major redesign of the website.
- February 8, 2006: Yahoo Sports launched the Yahoo Sports Blog.
- May 8, 2006: Yahoo Sports starts streaming free live NHL games.
- May 30, 2006: Yahoo Sports launched the Yahoo Sports Beta website.
- February 1, 2007: Yahoo Sports launched the current homepage.
- February 1, 2007: Yahoo Sports Beta website was taken offline.
- June 21, 2007: Yahoo Sports acquires Rivals.com.
- January 11, 2011: Yahoo Sports combines with SportsFanLive.com. to begin producing ThePostGame.com, a daily online magazine.
- August 26, 2013: Yahoo Sports page launches a new graphical look with dark backgrounds and bigger text. The new redesign was met with highly negative reactions.
- June 3, 2015: the NFL awards Yahoo Sports the exclusive right to broadcast the October 25 game between the Buffalo Bills and Jacksonville Jaguars from London, England, via free livestream.
- January 29, 2016: Yahoo Sports launches The Vertical subsection for news involving the NBA.
- June 13, 2017: Verizon takes control of Yahoo! Sports.
- December 11, 2017: Verizon and the NFL sign deal to allow NFL Streaming of live local and primetime games to the Yahoo! Sports Mobile App on Mobile Phones and Tablets.
- January 17, 2018: Verizon gets rights to stream NBA League Pass the out of market sports package that shows every out-of-market non nationally televised game to the Yahoo! Sports app for $200 a year.
- On October 29, 2019, Yahoo Sports announced a sports betting partnership with BetMGM, a joint venture of casino operator MGM Resorts and UK gambling operator GVC Holdings. On November 14, 2019, the Yahoo Sportsbook launched in New Jersey, with launches in other U.S. states dependent on those states approving legal wagering.

== Yahoo and NBC Sports Group ==
On December 9, 2012, Yahoo and the NBC Sports Group announced a content and promotional deal combining Yahoo Sports' original reporting expertise, coverage of big events, Rivals' college content and popular fantasy sports products with NBC Sports Group's growing digital assets, and significant television promotion and integration.

While Yahoo Sports and the NBC Sports Group will continue to maintain separate sites and editorial control of their respective newsrooms and digital properties, they will collaborate on premium sports news and events coverage both online and on the air. Yahoo Sports' popular products will also be included in the NBC Sports Group's digital assets.

Key features of the alliance include:

Editorial Depth: The combined talent roster of Yahoo Sports and NBC Sports features award-winning reporters and commentators, such as NBC's Bob Costas and Mike Florio as well as Yahoo Sports' Dan Wetzel and Adrian Wojnarowski. Yahoo Sports' investigative reporting will be featured on NBC TV, giving fans multiple-platform delivery.

Original Video Programming Concepts: Yahoo Sports and NBC Sports will work together to develop original made-for-web video programs that will appear on both Yahoo Sports and NBCSports.com featuring fan favorites from among the award-winning editorial teams' rosters, including:

NBC Sports host and Emmy Award-winning commentator Bob Costas: video sports news interviews and editorials Football Night in America's Tony Dungy & Rodney Harrison: video segments during NFL season

Mike Florio of ProFootballTalk on NBCSports.com: daily, weekday NFL web show, Pro Football Talk Live

Rivals on Recruiting: weekly college recruiting show with Rivals and NBC Sports talent.

Live Streaming: Yahoo Sports will link to and promote the NBC Sports Live Extra video player. Fans will be able to watch live streams of some of NBC's biggest events, starting with Sunday Night Football and NHL Game of the Week. Live content from NBC Sports Network will continue to be distributed through NBC Sports Live Extra on a TV Everywhere basis.

Fantasy Sports: Yahoo Sports, the leading fantasy platform, will become the exclusive fantasy game provider of NBC Sports' Rotoworld, the premiere fantasy news and information site. This will include Yahoo Sports' fantasy experiences for football, baseball, hockey, soccer, College Bowl Pick'em and Tourney Pick'em.

Rivals.com: The college sports destination will power recruiting and college sporting news for NBCSports.com and the NBC Sports Regional Networks.

NBC Sports Regional Networks: The authentic, local sports properties will serve as Yahoo Sports' preferred content provider in relevant markets, and integrate Yahoo Sports' team pages, fantasy experts and sports talent.

NBC's Alli Sports: Providing youth-focused, action-sports video and other content to Yahoo Sports.

== Blogs ==
| Sport | Title | Editor |
|---|---|---|
| NFL | Shutdown Corner | Frank Schwab |
| MLB | Big League Stew | Kevin Kaduk |
| NBA | Ball Don't Lie | |
| NHL | Puck Daddy | |
| College football | Dr. Saturday | Graham Watson |
| College basketball | The Dagger | Jeff Eisenberg |
| NASCAR | From the Marbles | Jay Busbee |
| Golf | Devil Ball Golf | Shane Bacon |
| Olympics | Fourth-Place Medal | Maggie Hendricks |
| Mixed martial arts | Cagewriter | Maggie Hendricks |
| Fantasy sports | Roto Arcade | Andy Behrens |
| Tennis | Busted Racquet | Shane Bacon |
| Association Football | Dirty Tackle | Brooks Peck |
| High School Sports | Prep Rally | Cameron Smith |

== Notable accomplishments ==
- In 2006 it was revealed that "Fans spend more time on Yahoo Sports than any other sports site" according to comScore Media Metrix.
- Before the 2006 NFL draft, Yahoo Sports revealed the allegations that Reggie Bush accepted gifts from an upstart sports marketing firm in exchange for his patronage.
- On August 16, 2011, Yahoo Sports broke the story of a massive scandal involving the University of Miami, based on over 100 hours of interviews with former Hurricanes booster and convicted fraudster Nevin Shapiro.
- On June 23, 2016, Yahoo Sports via The Vertical name-hosted the first-ever live stream of an NBA draft by hosting the 2016 NBA draft and unveiling information as it was revealed, which usually happened moments in advance of the original selections were revealed on TV. The livestream produced over 2.8 million unique viewers for an average of 34 minutes per user, with there being 3.7 million viewers throughout the course of over four hours of extensive coverage. It also beat out ESPN's viewership results for the draft, with it holding a rating of 2.4 million viewers. This resulted in their return to the livestream for the 2017 NBA draft on June 22 a year later.
