= Alexander Wolff =

American sportswriter

Alexander Wolff is a writer for Sports Illustrated and former owner of the Vermont Frost Heaves of the Premier Basketball League (PBL).

== Career ==
Wolff has written several books about basketball, among them Big Game, Small World (ISBN 0-446-52601-0), a look at basketball around the world.

=== University of Miami articles ===
Wolff's most notable and notorious work was a cover article in Sports Illustrated in the magazine's June 12, 1995 edition, titled "Why the University of Miami Should Drop Football." In it, Wolff wrote an open letter to then University of Miami president Edward T. Foote II, expressing his view that the Hurricanes had become a "disease" that had ruined the school's image and needed to be at least temporarily shut down.

In 2011, Wolff wrote a follow-up letter in 2011 to then University of Miami president Donna Shalala following the Nevin Shapiro booster controversy.

=== Book ===
Endpapers: A Family Story of Books, War, Escape, and Home, Wolff's memoir of his father and grandfather Kurt Wolff, and observations drawn from his year living in Berlin, was published in 2021.

== Filmography ==
Year	Title	Role	Notes	Ref
2012	The Other Dream Team	Himself	Documentary about the Lithuania men's national basketball team at the 1992 Summer Olympics.	
