= Olivier Vernon =

American football player (born 1990)

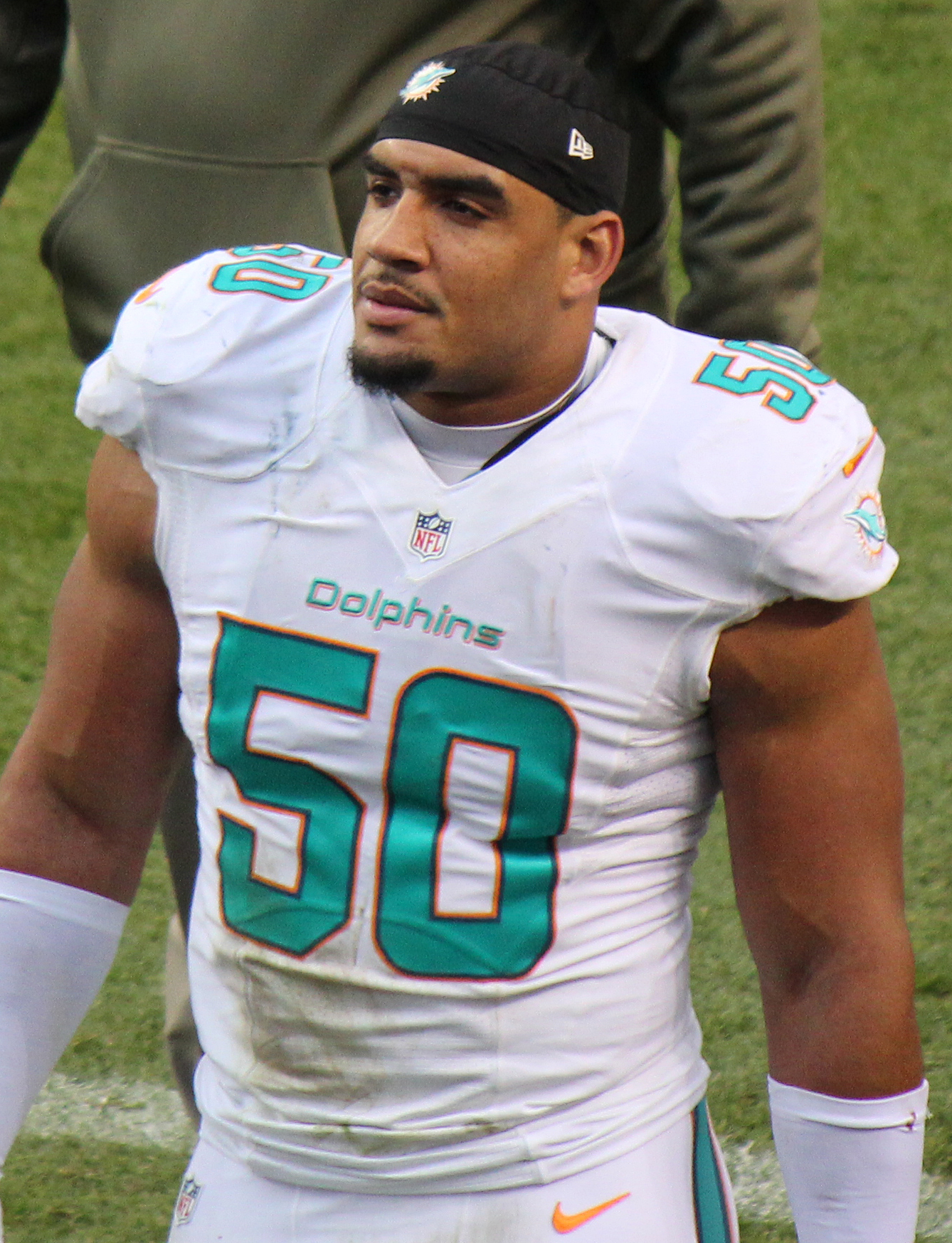
- Vernon with the Miami Dolphins in 2014

No. 50, 54
- Position: Defensive end

Personal information
- Born: October 7, 1990 (age 36); Miami, Florida, U.S.
- Listed height: 6 ft 2 in (1.88 m)
- Listed weight: 262 lb (119 kg)

Career information
- High school: American (Hialeah, Florida)
- College: Miami (FL) (2009–2011)
- NFL draft: 2012: 3rd round, 72nd overall pick

Career history
- Miami Dolphins (2012–2015); New York Giants (2016–2018); Cleveland Browns (2019–2020)

Awards and highlights
- Second-team All-Pro (2016); Pro Bowl (2018)

Career NFL statistics
- Total tackles: 389
- Sacks: 63.5
- Forced fumbles: 9
- Fumble recoveries: 3
- Interceptions: 1
- Total touchdowns: 1
- Stats at Pro Football Reference

Olivier Alexander Vernon (born October 7, 1990) is an American former professional football player who was a defensive end and outside linebacker in the National Football League (NFL). He played college football at the Miami Hurricanes. He was selected by the Miami Dolphins in the third round of the 2012 NFL draft and also played for the New York Giants and the Cleveland Browns.

== Early life ==
Vernon attended American High School in Miami, Florida.

Considered a four-star recruit by Rivals.com, he was rated as the 11th best weakside defensive end prospect of his class.

== College career ==
Vernon attended the University of Miami, playing for the Miami Hurricanes football team for three seasons. During his career, he totaled 81 tackles, including 20.5 for loss, and nine sacks. Vernon was one of the guilty players in the 2011 University of Miami athletics scandal receiving a six game suspension for accepting bribes from a booster Nevin Shapiro.

== Professional career ==
Pre-draft measurables
Height	Weight	Arm length	Hand span	40-yard dash	10-yard split	20-yard split	20-yard shuttle	Three-cone drill	Vertical jump	Broad jump	Bench press
6 ft 2 1/8 in (1.88 m)	261 lb (118 kg)	33 in (0.84 m)	10 1/8 in (0.26 m)	4.80 s	1.64 s	2.78 s	4.50 s	7.39 s	34 1/2 in (0.88 m)	10 ft 2 in (3.10 m)	31 reps
All values from NFL Combine

=== Miami Dolphins ===
==== 2012 ====
The Miami Dolphins selected Vernon in the third round (72nd overall) of the 2012 NFL draft. Vernon was the eighth defensive end drafted in 2012. His selection ended a drought of eight years without the Miami Dolphins drafting a player from the University of Miami. The last one had been Vernon Carey in 2004.

On July 25, 2012, the Dolphins signed Vernon to a four-year, $2.84 million contract that includes a signing bonus of $630,080.

Throughout his first training camp, Vernon competed against Jared Odrick, Randy Starks, Jonathan Freeny, and Jamaal Westerman for a job as a starting defensive end. Head coach Joe Philbin named Vernon a backup defensive end to begin the regular season, behind Cameron Wake and Jared Odrick.

He made his professional regular season debut in the Miami Dolphins' season-opener at the Houston Texans and recorded one solo tackle in their 30–10 loss. On September 23, 2012, Vernon collected a season-high five sacks and was credited for half a sack to mark the first of his career during a 23–20 loss against the New York Jets in Week 3. Vernon's first sack was alongside teammate Jared Odrick, as both of them brought Jets' quarterback Mark Sanchez down for a six-yard loss in the second quarter. In Week 6, he recorded four solo tackles and made a season-high two sacks on Rams' quarterback Sam Bradford as the Dolphins defeated the St. Louis Rams 17–14. On October 28, 2012, Vernon recorded a tackle and scored the first touchdown of his career after recovering a blocked punt by teammate Jimmy Wilson in the end zone during the first quarter of a 30–9 win at the New York Jets in Week 8. Vernon also blocked a 35-yard field goal attempt by Jets' kicker Nick Folk in the end of the second quarter. Vernon finished his rookie season in 2012 with 32 combined tackles (25 solo), 3.5 sacks, one forced fumble, and a touchdown in 16 games and zero starts.

==== 2013 ====
During training camp, Vernon competed against Jared Odrick and Dion Jordan to be a starting defensive end, opposite Cameron Wake. Head coach Joe Philbin names Vernon and Cameron Wake the starting defensive ends to start the regular season. They began the season alongside defensive tackles Paul Soliai and Randy Starks.

On September 8, 2013, Vernon earned his first career start during the Miami Dolphins' season-opening 23–10 victory at the Cleveland Browns. On December 1, 2013, Vernon collected a season-high ten combined tackles (eight solo) and recorded a season-high three sacks during a 23–3 victory at the New York Jets in Week 13. Vernon recorded one of his sacks on Jets' quarterback Geno Smith and earned another two by sacking backup quarterback Matt Simms. He finished the 2013 NFL season with 57 combined tackles (46 solo) and a career-high 11.5 sacks in 16 games and 14 starts.

==== 2014 ====
Vernon entered training camp slated as a starting defensive end in 2014. Head coach Joe Philbin retained Vernon and Cameron Wake as the starting defensive ends to begin the 2014 regular season. In Week 6, he collected a season-high seven combined tackles and made 1.5 sacks on Packers' quarterback Aaron Rodgers during a 27–24 loss to the Green Bay Packers. Vernon started in all 16 games in 2014 and recorded 46 combined tackles (31 solo) and 6.5 sacks.

==== 2015 ====
Defensive coordinator Kevin Coyle retained Vernon as a starting defensive end entering training camp. Head coach Joe Philbin names Vernon and Cameron Wake the starting defensive ends to begin the regular season. They started alongside defensive tackles Ndamukong Suh and Earl Mitchell. In Week 13, he recorded six combined tackles and made a season-high 2.5 sacks during a 15–13 win against the Baltimore Ravens. On December 20, 2015, Vernon collected a season-high 11 combined tackles (six solo) and was credited with half a sack in the Dolphins' 30–14 loss at the San Diego Chargers in Week 15. Vernon started in all 16 games in 2015 and recorded 61 combined tackles (41 solo) and 7.5 sacks.

=== New York Giants ===
==== 2016 ====
On March 9, 2016, the New York Giants signed Vernon to a five-year, $85 million contract that included $52.5 million guaranteed and a signing bonus of $20 million.

Head coach Ben McAdoo named Vernon and Jason Pierre-Paul the starting defensive ends. They started alongside defensive tackles Damon Harrison and Johnathan Hankins. In Week 10, he collected a season-high ten combined tackles (four solo) and made one sack during a 21–20 win against the Cincinnati Bengals. On November 27, 2016, Vernon recorded four solo tackles and made a season-high two sacks on Browns' quarterback Josh McCown during a 27–13 win at the Cleveland Browns in Week 12. The following week, he made four solo tackles and tied his season-high of two sacks during a 24–14 loss at the Pittsburgh Steelers in Week 13. Vernon finished his first season as a member of the New York Giants with a career-high 63 combined tackles (44 solo) and 8.5 sacks. He was named second-team All-Pro.

==== 2017 ====
Defensive coordinator Steve Spagnuolo retained Vernon and Jason Pierre-Paul as the starting defensive ends in 2017. In Week 3, he collected a season-high five combined tackles and made one sack as the Giants lost 27–24 at the Philadelphia Eagles. Vernon was sidelined for four games (Weeks 5–9) due to an ankle injury. On November 12, 2017, Vernon recorded four combined tackles, deflected a pass, and made his first career interception during the Giants' 31–21 loss at the San Francisco 49ers in Week 10. Vernon intercepted a pass by 49ers' quarterback C. J. Beathard, that was intended for running back Matt Breida, during the third quarter. On December 4, 2017, the New York Giants fired head coach Ben McAdoo after the Giants fell to a 2–10 record. Defensive coordinator Steve Spagnuolo was named the interim head coach for the last four games of the season. He finished the 2017 NFL season with 37 combined tackles (22 solo), 6.5 sacks, two forced fumbles, one interception, and one sack in 12 games and 12 starts. He received an overall grade of 84.2 from Pro Football Focus.

==== 2018 ====
On January 22, 2018, the New York Giants announced their decision to hire Minnesota Vikings' offensive coordinator Pat Shurmur as their new head coach. Shumur hired James Bettcher as defensive coordinator and changed the base 4-3 defense into a base 3-4 defense. As a result, Vernon was moved from defensive end to outside linebacker. Vernon entered training camp slated as a starting outside linebacker, but saw competition from Kareem Martin, Connor Barwin, and Lorenzo Carter. Head coach Pat Shumur named Vernon and Kareem Martin the starting outside linebackers to star the regular season. They started alongside inside linebackers B. J. Goodson and Alec Ogletree.

He missed the first five games (a Week 1–5) due to an ankle injury. In Week 13, Vernon collected a season-high five solo tackles, made two sacks, and one pass deflection during a 30–27 win against the Chicago Bears. On December 18, 2018, Vernon was named as an alternate to the 2019 Pro Bowl. On December 30, 2018, he recorded five combined tackles and made a season-high 2.5 sacks during a 36–35 loss against the Dallas Cowboys in Week 17. He finished the season with 30 combined tackles (23 solo), seven pass deflections, and one pass deflection in 11 games and 11 starts. Vernon received an overall grade of 86.3 from Pro Football Focus in 2018, which ranked 14th among all edge rushers. On January 19, 2019, it was announced that Vernon was selected to play in the 2019 Pro Bowl as a replacement for Khalil Mack who was unable to play due to an injury.

=== Cleveland Browns ===
On March 13, 2019, Vernon was acquired by the Cleveland Browns, along with Odell Beckham Jr., in exchange for Jabrill Peppers, Kevin Zeitler, and the Browns' first- and third-round picks in the 2019 NFL draft.

In Week 8 of the 2020 season against the Las Vegas Raiders, Vernon recorded his first two sacks of the season on Derek Carr during the 16–6 loss. In Week 11 against the Philadelphia Eagles, Vernon recorded three sacks on Carson Wentz, including one in the endzone for a safety, during the 22–17 win, later earning the AFC Defensive Player of the Week award. In Week 17 against the Pittsburgh Steelers, Vernon recorded his ninth sack of the season on Mason Rudolph prior to tearing his Achilles during the 24–22 win. On January 5, 2021, Vernon was placed on injured reserve.

Vernon became an unrestricted free agent following the 2020 season.

== NFL career statistics ==
Year	Team	Games		Tackles							Fumbles				Interceptions				
Year	Team	GP	GS	Cmb	Solo	Ast	Sck	TFL	QBH	Sfty	FF	FR	Yds	TD	Int	Yds	Lng	TD	PD
2012	MIA	16	0	23	18	5	3.5	3	9	0	1	0	0	0	—	—	—	—	—
2013	MIA	16	14	57	46	11	11.5	13	16	0	—	—	—	—	—	—	—	—	—
2014	MIA	16	16	47	32	15	6.5	9	13	0	2	0	0	0	—	—	—	—	—
2015	MIA	16	16	61	41	20	7.5	18	36	0	—	—	—	—	—	—	—	—	—
2016	NYG	16	16	64	46	18	8.5	17	23	0	1	1	0	0	—	—	—	—	—
2017	NYG	12	12	37	23	14	6.5	6	12	0	2	0	0	0	1	0	0	0	1
2018	NYG	11	11	30	23	7	7.0	5	21	0	1	1	43	0	0	0	0	0	1
2019	CLE	10	10	26	20	6	3.5	5	11	0	1	0	0	0	—	—	—	—	—
2020	CLE	14	13	36	24	12	9.0	12	16	1	1	1	0	0	0	0	0	0	3
Career		127	108	389	279	110	63.5	87	157	1	9	3	43	0	1	0	0	0	5

== Personal life ==
Vernon is currently married to Eden Marley, the daughter of former football player Rohan Marley, and granddaughter of reggae singer Bob Marley. In 2021, the couple welcomed a daughter named Ocean.

Vernon's mother is Swiss, emigrating to the United States from Uzwil in the 1980s.
