= Michael Huyghue =

American businessman (born 1961)

Michael L. Huyghue
- Born: September 21, 1961 (age 65)
- Education: Cornell University; University of Michigan
- Occupations: Head Coach, Cornell University Sprint Football Chairman, Axcess Sports & Entertainment, LLC; Commissioner, United Football League, LLC
- Spouse: Kimberly Huyghue
- Children: 3
- Parent(s): Bruce and Joan Huyghue
- Website: Michael Huyghue

Michael L. Huyghue (born September 21, 1961; pronounced "hewg") is a sports lawyer and businessman and former commissioner of the United Football League, having served in that capacity since the league's founding in 2007. He was previously a member of the legal department of the NFL Players Association before joining the NFL Management Council. Uniquely positioned from having thus worked on both sides of the player/management relationship, he called for the 2011 NFL labor standoff to be settled by keeping the lawyers for both sides out of the negotiating process.

After the formulation of the World League of American Football, the predecessor of NFL Europa, Huyghue joined the Birmingham Fire as general manager. After the league's demise in 1992, he moved to the Detroit Lions of the National Football League as vice-president, a role he also fulfilled for the expansion Jacksonville Jaguars from 1994 until 2001. Huyghue was also previously a sports agent, managing NFL players such as Adam "Pacman" Jones.

Huyghue is originally from suburban Hartford, Connecticut, a situation that was a factor in his placing a UFL franchise, the Hartford Colonials, in the area. His family is from St. Thomas, United States Virgin Islands. Huyghue was a three-year football and baseball player while at Cornell University, and received a Juris Doctor degree from the University of Michigan. He now is the Terry Cullen Head Coach of Sprint Football at Cornell University, where he is also a visiting professor at the law school. His expertise is in Sports Law.

== Controversy ==
On August 16, 2011, Yahoo! Sports reported that Nevin Shapiro, a former University of Miami booster incarcerated for his role in a $930 million Ponzi scheme, was alleging that he had provided "thousands of impermissible benefits to at least 72 University of Miami athletes from 2002 through 2010." In the article, Shapiro claimed that during his time as a University of Miami booster, he also co-owned a sports agency, Axcess Sports & Entertainment, with Huyghue. Shapiro alleged that he introduced Huyghue to several Miami Hurricanes players, leaving it to Huyghue to provide "his own set of extra benefits to athletes as he saw fit, including cash payments, travel and other inducements." Shapiro "told federal prosecutors that's precisely what Huyghue did, giving multiple illicit benefits, including cash, to several players at Miami."

Huyghue rejected Shapiro's claims. "He's a convicted felon," Huyghue said in the same article. "I just don't want to get into such fantasy. I just wouldn't want to even go down that path. I don't even care what he said. Whatever he could say, there's just no substance to it."

On January 31, 2012, Huyghue resigned as commissioner of the United Football League.
