= Aubrey Hill =

American football player and coach (1972–2020)

Biographical details
- Born: February 18, 1972; Miami, Florida, U.S.
- Died: August 16, 2020 (aged 48)

Playing career
- 1991–1994: University of Florida
- Position: Wide receiver

Coaching career (HC unless noted)
- 1996–1998: University of Florida (GA)
- 1999–2003: Duke University (WR)
- 2004: Elon University (WR)
- 2005–2007: University of Pittsburgh (WR)
- 2008–2009: University of Miami (WR)
- 2010: University of Miami (WR/RC)
- 2011–2012: University of Florida (WR/RC)

Aubrey Hill (February 18, 1972 – August 16, 2020) was an American college football player and coach. Hill was the wide receivers coach for the Florida Gators football team that represents the University of Florida in Gainesville, Florida.

== Career ==
Hill grew up in his hometown of Miami, Florida. He played high school football at Miami Carol City Senior High, where he won a State championship in 2016 as the Chiefs Head Coach. He played college football at the University of Florida for 4 seasons, from 1991 to 1994. During this time the Gators won their first 3 official Southeastern Conference championships, in 1991, and 1993-94.

Hill began his coaching career at his alma mater, serving as a graduate assistant at Florida from 1996 to 1998. During his first season as a graduate assistant, the Gators won the 1997 Sugar Bowl to capture their first national championship.

Hill departed Florida for Duke University in 1999 and served as wide receivers coach during the tenure of Carl Franks. Following Franks' dismissal, Hill coached receivers at Elon University for one year (2004), then at the University of Pittsburgh from 2005 to 2007.

He joined the Miami Hurricanes as wide receivers coach in 2008 under Randy Shannon. In 2010 Hill also earned the title of recruiting coordinator.

On December 20, 2010, incoming Hurricanes head coach Al Golden announced that Hill would be retained from Shannon's staff with the same responsibilities in 2011. However, on December 31, 2010, Hill announced to ESPN's Bruce Feldman that he was going to return to the University of Florida under new Florida head coach, Will Muschamp.

Amid allegations that he was one of the coaches involved in the 2011 University of Miami athletics scandal during his tenure with the Hurricanes, Hill resigned from Florida days before the 2012 season. On October 22, 2013, the NCAA handed down a two-year show-cause penalty against Hill, essentially blacklisting him from college football during that time.

Hill was the head coach of the Carol City Chiefs, the team for which he played in high school.

== Death ==
Hill died on August 16, 2020, at the age of 48 from cancer.
