= Paul Dee =

American college athletic director (1947–2012)

- Born: January 6, 1947; Hoboken, New Jersey, U.S.
- Died: May 12, 2012 (aged 65)
- Education: University of Florida
- Known for: Athletic Director University of Miami (1993-2008), Past Chairman NCAA Committee on Infractions

Paul T. Dee (January 6, 1947 – May 12, 2012) was general counsel and athletic director of the University of Miami in Coral Gables, Florida. He held the position of University of Miami athletic director from 1993 until 2008.

== Early life and education ==
Dee was born in Hoboken, New Jersey, and grew up in West Palm Beach, Florida. He attended the University of Florida, graduating in 1970 with a Bachelor of Arts. At the University of Florida, he was a member of the Alpha Tau Omega fraternity.

Dee earned a master's degree in education from the University of Miami in 1973 and a Juris Doctor from the University of Miami School of Law in 1977.

== Career ==
=== University of Miami ===
After graduating from the University of Miami School of Law, Dee began his career at the University of Miami as an attorney for the university. In 1981, he was appointed University of Miami vice president and general counsel. In 1993, Dee was named the athletic director for the Miami Hurricanes athletics program.

==== NCAA rules violations 1993-1995 ====
From 1993 through 1995, eighty students, 57 of whom were football players, falsified their Pell Grant applications, illegally securing more than $220,000 in federal grant money. Federal officials described the scam as "perhaps the largest centralized fraud ever committed in the history of the Pell Grant program."

The University of Miami provided over $400,000 worth of other improper payments to University of Miami football players. The NCAA also ruled that the university failed to wholly implement its drug-testing program, and permitted three football student-athletes to compete without being subject to the required disciplinary measures specified in the policy. From 2002 to 2010, the University of Miami football program was provided with thousands of impermissible benefits to at least 72 athletes from booster Nevin Shapiro.

==== NCAA violations 2003-2011 ====
According to news reports, from 2002 through the end of Dee's tenure, booster Nevin Shapiro provided the University of Miami football and basketball players with numerous benefits that violated NCAA rules including hundreds of thousands of dollars, gifts, prostitutes, access to yachts and housing, and expensive social events.

=== University of Southern California ===
After leaving the University of Miami, Dee was chairman of the Committee on Infractions at the NCAA, the committee responsible for enforcing NCAA rules and punishing violators. He oversaw the investigation into the University of Southern California's improper relationship with Reggie Bush.

== Death ==
Dee died of cancer on May 12, 2012, at age 65.
