= Reggie Bush =

American football player (born 1985)

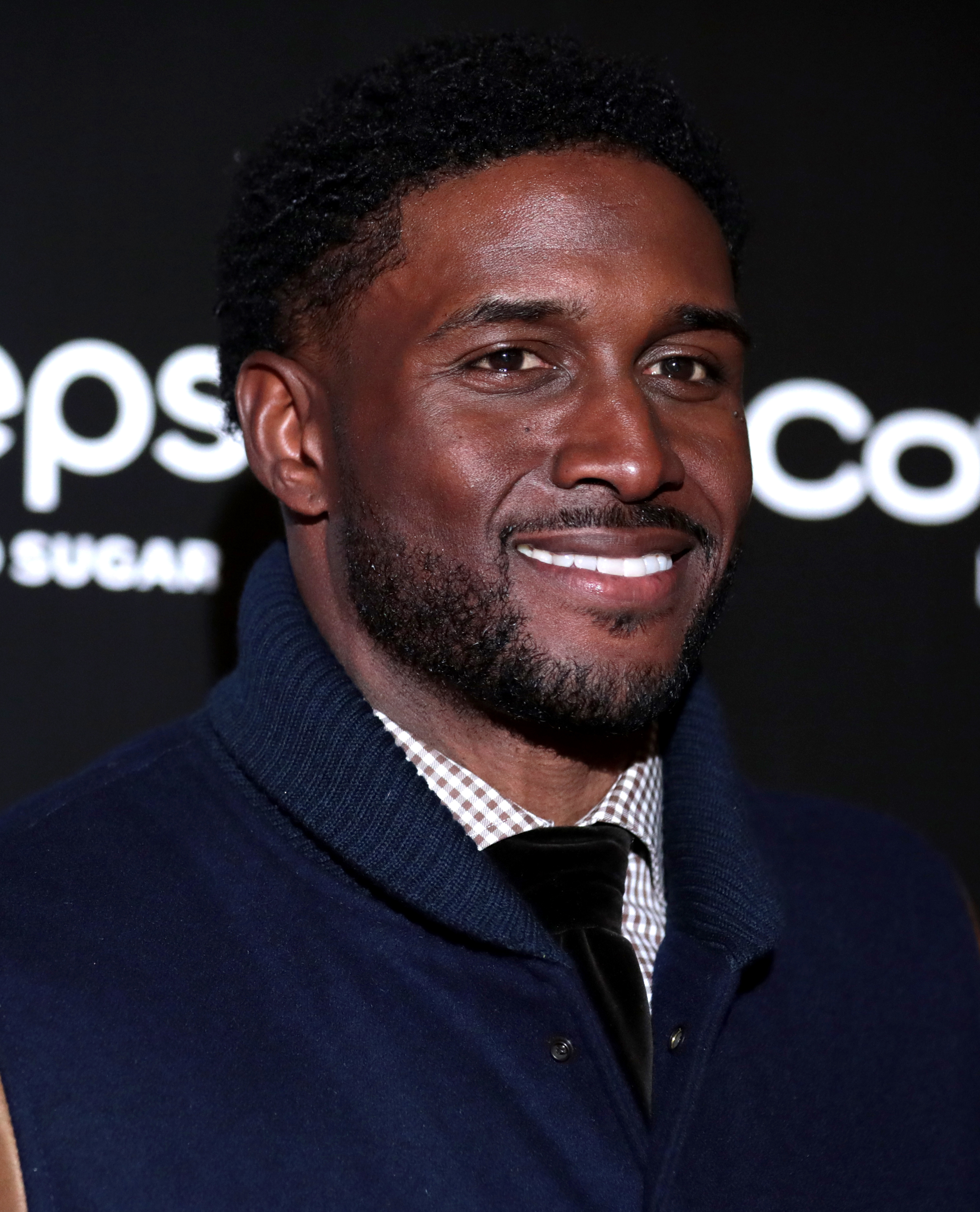
- Bush in 2023

No. 5, 25, 22, 21, 23
- Position: Running back

Personal information
- Born: March 2, 1985 (age 41); Spring Valley, California, U.S.
- Listed height: 6 ft 0 in (1.83 m)
- Listed weight: 205 lb (93 kg)

Career information
- High school: Helix (La Mesa, California)
- College: USC (2003–2005)
- NFL draft: 2006: 1st round, 2nd overall pick

Career history
- New Orleans Saints (2006–2010); Miami Dolphins (2011–2012); Detroit Lions (2013–2014); San Francisco 49ers (2015); Buffalo Bills (2016)

Awards and highlights
- Super Bowl champion (XLIV); First-team All-Pro (2008); NFL PFWA All-Rookie Team (2006); New Orleans Saints Hall of Fame; BCS national champion (2004) (Note: The championship was later vacated by the BCS on June 6, 2011, following the imposition of sanctions by the NCAA, including vacation of games during the 2004 season.); 2× AP national champion (2003, 2004); Heisman Trophy (2005); 2× Consensus All-American (2004, 2005); USC Trojans No. 5 retired

Career NFL statistics
- Rushing attempts: 1,286
- Rushing yards: 5,490
- Receptions: 477
- Receiving yards: 3,598
- Return yards: 929
- Total touchdowns: 58
- Stats at Pro Football Reference
- College Football Hall of Fame

Reginald Alfred Bush II (born March 2, 1985) is an American former professional football player who was a running back in the National Football League (NFL). He played college football for the USC Trojans, earning consensus All-American honors twice and winning the 2005 Heisman Trophy. Bush is widely regarded as one of the greatest college football players of all time.

He was selected by the New Orleans Saints second overall in the 2006 NFL draft. Bush was named an All-Pro punt returner in 2008 and helped the Saints win Super Bowl XLIV in 2010. He also played for the Buffalo Bills, Miami Dolphins, Detroit Lions, and San Francisco 49ers before retiring from professional football in 2017. Bush later worked as a college football analyst for Fox Sports.

Allegations that he received improper benefits with USC in 2004 were central to an NCAA investigation of the USC football program that led to severe sanctions against the school, including a two-year postseason ban and the vacating of the 2004 national championship. Bush voluntarily forfeited his Heisman Trophy in 2010 during the scandal, but it was reinstated 14 years later during the NCAA rule changes.

== Early life ==
Reginald Alfred Bush II was born on March 2, 1985 in Spring Valley in San Diego County, California, and named after his biological father, Reginald Sr. He was a running back at Helix High School in La Mesa, California. While at Helix, he played with 2004 Heisman Trophy finalist and first overall pick in the 2005 NFL draft Alex Smith. During his prep career with the Helix Highlanders, he won the prestigious Silver Pigskin trophy awarded by KUSI's Prep Pigskin Report. Smith and Bush were later finalists for the 2004 Heisman, making it the first time a high school had two finalists at the same ceremony. He played in the 2003 U.S. Army All-American Bowl.

Considered a five-star recruit by Rivals.com, Bush was listed as the No. 1 running back in the nation in 2003.

Bush was also a track star at Helix, placing second (10.72) -1.7m in the 2002 CIF California State Meet 100 meters final and posting bests of 10.42 seconds in the 100 meters (both the fastest prep time in the state and among the nation's senior football players) and 21.06 seconds in the 200 meters (third fastest prep in California in 2002). Bush is still 3rd all-time on the 100m dash list for San Diego. He placed second in the boys' 50 meters, clocking at 5.85 at the 2003 Los Angeles Invitational Indoor Meet.

== College career ==
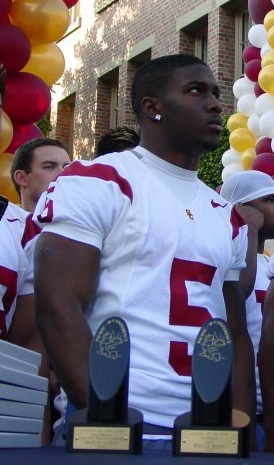
Bush with the USC Trojans in 2005

=== USC ===
Bush received an athletic scholarship to attend the University of Southern California, where he played for the Trojans from 2003 to 2005 under head coach Pete Carroll. When Carroll recruited Bush he envisioned using him as a five-way threat.

==== 2003 season ====
The freshman quickly proved effective in carrying, catching, throwing, and returning the ball. Bush was a consensus first-team Freshman All-American selection in 2003, and became the first Trojan since Anthony Davis in 1974 to lead the Pacific-10 Conference in kickoff returns. His 1,331 all-purpose yards set a USC freshman record. The ESPN Pac-10 Newcomer of the Year also amassed 521 yards rushing that year, with three touchdowns on 91 carries.

==== 2004 season ====
University of Utah quarterback Alex Smith and Bush were both finalists for the 2004 Heisman Trophy, making it the first time a high school had two finalists at the same ceremony. In 2004, Bush finished fifth in the Heisman voting and was named the team's MVP. He earned consensus All-American honors and was a finalist for the Walter Camp Player of the Year Award.

He finished second on the team with 143 carries for 908 yards (6.3 avg) and six touchdowns, adding 509 yards and seven scores on 43 receptions (11.8 avg). Bush returned 21 kickoffs for 537 yards (25.6 avg) and 24 punts for 376 yards (15.7 avg) and a pair of touchdowns. He became the first Trojan since Marcus Allen to lead the Pac-10 in all-purpose yardage, totaling 2,330 yards. He also threw for one touchdown, tossing a 52-yard scoring strike.

==== 2005 Heisman season ====
In 2005, Bush had amassed 2,611 all-purpose yards and scored 18 touchdowns (15 rushing, two receiving, one punt return). He led the Trojans with 1,740 yards on 200 carries (8.7 avg) with 16 touchdowns and ranked third on the squad with 39 receptions for 481 yards (12.9 avg), including a pair of scores as a junior. He returned 18 punts for 179 yards (9.9 avg) and a touchdown, and gained 493 yards on 28 kickoff returns (17.6 avg).

He led the nation with an average of 222.3 all-purpose yards per game and finished fourth in the NCAA Division I-A ranks with an average of 133.85 rushing yards per game. He set the Pac-10 record for all-purpose yards in a game, with 513 (294 rushing, 68 receiving, 151 return) against the Fresno State Bulldogs on November 19, 2005. Bush also became known for the "Bush Push," which occurred on a game-winning score against the Notre Dame Fighting Irish.

By the end of the season, Bush was a unanimous first-team All-American. He was also named the Associated Press College Football Player of the Year, the Pigskin Club of Washington, D.C. Offensive Player of the Year, and the Touchdown Club of Columbus (Ohio) Player of the Year. In addition to the Walter Camp Award, Bush also won the Doak Walker Award, which is given to the nation's best running back.

He was awarded the Heisman Trophy on December 10, 2005. He had 784 first-place votes while University of Texas Longhorns quarterback Vince Young finished second with 79 first-place votes, an overall edge in voting points of 2,541 to Young's 1,608. Teammate Matt Leinart came in third with 18 first-place votes. Bush had the second most first-place votes and the second-highest total points in the history of Heisman voting at that time, behind only O. J. Simpson's 855 in 1968. Bush became the 71st winner of the Heisman Trophy, and the seventh USC player to receive the award.

On January 4, 2006, Bush and Leinart became the first pair of Heisman Trophy winners to play together for the same team in a single game, against the Longhorns in the Rose Bowl. Bush amassed a total of 279 all-purpose yards (82 rushing yards, 95 receiving yards, 102 kickoff return yards) and one touchdown, but he was overshadowed in a losing effort by Heisman runner-up Vince Young and Bush's teammate LenDale White, who led USC in rushing with 123 yards and three touchdowns. Bush also attempted to lateral when he was tackled after a long run in the second quarter, but the lateral fell to the ground and was recovered by the Longhorns.

=== Legacy ===
Bush started only 15 times in 39 games at USC. However, he finished tenth in NCAA Division I-A history with 6,541 all-purpose yards, racking up 3,169 yards and 25 touchdowns on 433 carries (7.3 avg) and 1,301 yards with 13 scores on 95 catches (13.7 avg). Bush returned 67 kickoffs for 1,522 yards and a touchdown, adding 559 yards and three scores on 44 punt returns (12.7 avg). He also completed one of three pass attempts for a 52-yard touchdown.

In celebration of their stellar college football careers, Bush and Leinart appeared on the cover of the December 25, 2005, issue of Sports Illustrated. The magazine anointed the pair as the "Best in College Football" in 2005. Bush was featured on the cover of NCAA Football 2007, released on July 18, 2006. He would later be ranked No. 24 on ESPN's 25 Greatest Players in College Football list.

=== USC athletics scandal ===
==== NCAA investigation and sanctions (2006–2010) ====
In 2006, reports surfaced raising questions about whether Bush's family received gifts in violation of NCAA policies. The school requested that the conference investigate the matter, and Bush denied any impropriety.

Sports agent Lloyd Lake sued Bush and his family in November 2007 in an effort to recoup $291,600 in cash and gifts. Lake also agreed to cooperate with the NCAA. In April 2009, the Los Angeles Times reported that the NCAA had merged its investigations of Bush and former USC basketball player O. J. Mayo into a single probe of the Trojans athletic programs. On December 28, 2009, it was announced that Bush had lost his bid for confidential arbitration in this matter and that the case would proceed to trial. The case was settled in April 2010.

On June 10, 2010, the NCAA announced major sanctions against USC. The NCAA found that Bush had received lavish gifts from Lake and his partner, Michael Michaels, from at least December 2004 onward, including a limousine ride to the 2005 Heisman Trophy presentation. As a result, USC was given four years of probation and forced to vacate its last two wins of the 2004 season – including the 2005 Orange Bowl – as well as all of its wins in the 2005 season. The Trojans were also banned from bowl games in 2010 and 2011 and lost 30 scholarships over three years. Running backs coach Todd McNair was banned from off-campus recruiting for one year after the NCAA determined he had known about Bush's dealings with the agents. McNair sued the NCAA for damages related to his dismissal and the NCAA lost. The judge in the case found the NCAA conducted the USC investigation and that of McNair with "malice". The NCAA also forced USC to disassociate itself from Bush for 10 years.

The NCAA determined that, given Bush's high-profile status, USC should have invested more effort in monitoring Bush's relationships. In announcing the penalties, NCAA infractions committee chairman Paul Dee said, "High-profile players merit high-profile enforcement."

==== Bush begins ten-year USC dissociation, vacates Heisman Trophy (2010–2020) ====
On July 20, 2010, incoming USC president Max Nikias said the school would remove from its facilities all jerseys and murals displayed in Bush's honor, and would return the school's copy of Bush's Heisman Trophy. On August 12, USA Today reported that Bush had called USC's new athletic director, Pat Haden, and apologized for making poor decisions that led to the NCAA sanctions. However, in a subsequent report in the Los Angeles Times, Haden said the characterization of Bush's call as an "apology" was incorrect; Haden described it as "a conversation of him being contrite, but not an apology", and he also noted that Bush had not admitted to any specific wrongful acts.

Amidst reports that the Heisman Trophy Trust would strip his award, Bush in September voluntarily forfeited his title as the 2005 winner. The Heisman Trust decided to leave the award vacated with no new winner to be announced, although it is speculated by Bush and others that the NCAA offered the award to both Vince Young and Matt Leinart, something that Bush said Vince Young confirmed to him. The San Diego Hall of Champions sports museum returned the copy of the award it possessed back to Bush's parents in 2011. Bush eventually returned his trophy to the Heisman Trust in 2012.

USC would unsuccessfully attempt to prematurely end their disassociation with Bush on several occasions. On September 20, 2019, Bush would make his first appearance in the Los Angeles Memorial Coliseum since sanctions began, as part of the Big Noon Kickoff crew to cover USC's game against the Utah Utes. Because his appearance in the stadium was for work-related purposes, the NCAA deemed it not in violation with the terms of the sanctions. Appearing alongside his old college teammate Leinart, Bush received a warm welcome by the USC fans, with the stadium chanting his name at several points throughout the game. In a May 2020 interview with The Athletic, Bush said the sanctions against USC due to his conduct was "one of the worst feelings in the world" and that the sanctions "felt like I died when I had to hear that there weren't gonna be scholarships for kids because of me or because of something connected to me... I'm still not over that. It's just something you learn to live with."

==== Heisman reinstatement campaign and success (2020–2024) ====
On June 9, 2020, USC announced they would be ending their disassociation with Bush following the conclusion of the NCAA's mandated 10-year span. After the NCAA ruled to allow players to make money from their name, image, and likeness (NIL) on June 30, 2021, Bush began advocating for the reinstatement of his Heisman Trophy and USC records. He reached out to the NCAA and the Heisman Trust president Michael Comerford, but received a call from Rob Whalen, the executive director stating that Comerford would not be corresponding with them. On July 2, the Heisman Trust issued a statement saying that the award would be returned to Bush if the NCAA reinstated his 2005 status at USC. On July 28, a statement issued by the NCAA said that no previous infractions would be re-evaluated, as the updated NIL rules continued to prohibit "pay-for-play type arrangements."

In April 2023, billboards began appearing in the Los Angeles area demanding the return of Bush's Heisman. On August 14, 2023, attorneys representing USC and Bush submitted a petition to the NCAA Committee on Infractions, asking them to review their 2010 case and reconsider their decision. On August 23, Bush announced that he was filing a defamation lawsuit against the NCAA. The lawsuit alleges that their use of the phrase "pay-for-play" in their July 2021 statement was a false claim directed at him that, consequently, damaged his reputation. The purpose of this lawsuit was to help him achieve his goal of reacquiring his trophy. Former Heisman winners Eddie George and Johnny Manziel voiced their support of Bush, with the latter announcing that he would boycott all future Heisman ceremonies until Bush would be allowed to stand on stage with him.

On April 24, 2024, the Heisman Trust announced it would return the Heisman Trophy to Bush, citing "enormous changes in the college football landscape". Among the changes cited, were changes to the NCAA's NIL payment policy and the U.S. Supreme Court's 2021 decision that questioned the legality of the NCAA's amateurism model. USC also restored Bush's banner at the Coliseum and retired his number alongside the school's other Heisman winners. Bush said in a statement: "I am grateful to once again be recognized as the recipient of the Heisman Trophy. This reinstatement is not only a personal victory, but also a validation of the tireless efforts of my supporters and advocates who have stood by me throughout this arduous journey".

== Professional career ==
On January 12, 2006, Bush elected to forgo his senior season at USC and declared himself eligible for the NFL draft. Bush's on field performances made him a contender for the top pick in the 2006 NFL draft, and he also made an impressive appearance at USC's highly publicized post-season pro day showcase, where he ran the 40-yard dash in 4.33 seconds. Draft analysts predicted that he would be the first overall pick in the draft, a pick held by the Houston Texans. However, in a surprising move on the night before the draft, the Texans signed Mario Williams, a defensive end from North Carolina State University, meaning that Bush would not be the first draft pick. Bush's representatives spoke that night with the New Orleans Saints, who said they intended to use the second overall pick to select Bush.

Bush was indeed drafted by the Saints with the second overall pick in the 2006 NFL Draft. The Houston Texans' decision to not take Bush was derided by many sports analysts. At the time, ESPN commentator Len Pasquarelli claimed that Houston selecting Williams ahead of Bush was one of the biggest mistakes made in NFL Draft history.

On April 26, 2006, three days prior to the draft, Bush had signed a multi-year endorsement with Adidas to promote football and training clothes, and help the athletic sportswear company launch cleats in 2007.

Pre-draft measurables
Height	Weight	Arm length	Hand span	40-yard dash	Vertical jump	Broad jump	Bench press
5 ft 10 7/8 in (1.80 m)	201 lb (91 kg)	30 1/4 in (0.77 m)	9 3/4 in (0.25 m)	4.33 s	40.5 in (1.03 m)	10 ft 8 in (3.25 m)	24 reps
All values from NFL Combine

=== New Orleans Saints ===
==== 2006 season ====
Bush's selection by the New Orleans Saints in the NFL Draft generated excitement and celebration among Saints fans. By the end of the week after the draft, Reebok reported receiving over 15,000 orders for Bush's Saints jersey, even though his jersey number with the Saints had not yet been determined. Bush had petitioned the NFL to wear the number 5, which he has worn throughout his high school and college careers. However, in order for him to wear that number, the NFL would have to revise its numbering regulations, which require running backs to wear a number between 20 and 49. Bush was allowed to wear the number 5 during the Saints' minicamp practices pending the NFL's ruling.

On May 23, 2006, the NFL competition committee officially rejected his request. On May 25 it was officially announced that Bush would be wearing number 25, acquired from Saints running back Fred McAfee. Although Bush had earlier pledged to donate a quarter of the money he received from jersey sales to Hurricane Katrina victims if allowed to wear the number 5, he later said he would make that donation no matter what number he wears. As part of the deal with McAfee to wear the number 25, Bush agreed to allocate half the money to charities of McAfee's choosing, the other half going to charities of Bush's choosing. McAfee pledged to donate his share to Katrina victims in his home state of Mississippi.

Bush was second to Peyton Manning in NFL endorsement deals, amounting to roughly US$5 million annually. He signed contracts with Pepsi, General Motors, Adidas, Pizza Hut and the Subway restaurant chain.

Amazed by the warm reception he received from the fans in New Orleans as well as the magnitude of the devastation caused there by Hurricane Katrina, Bush expressed excitement about playing with the Saints and pledged to help the city recover from the hurricane. On May 15, 2006, Bush donated US$50,000 to help keep Holy Rosary High School, a Catholic school for students with learning disabilities, from closing. During training camp, Saints receiver Joe Horn dubbed him "Baby Matrix" because of his seemingly impossible evasive maneuvers (apparently comparing him to the movie The Matrix, which features characters who move faster than humanly possible to dodge bullets).

Bush's rookie season had both ups and downs, although as the season wore on he became more productive and integral to the Saints' surprising success. In the first game of Bush's NFL career, he amassed 141 total yards against the Cleveland Browns. He carried the ball fewer times than his counterpart Deuce McAllister, putting off any speculation that he would immediately supplant McAllister as the starter in New Orleans. The Saints won the game by a score of 19–14. In his team's Week 9 contest against the Tampa Bay Buccaneers, Bush finished the game with minus-5 yards on eleven carries despite the Saints' 31–14 victory. This effort lowered his league-worst rushing average among running backs to only 2.55 yards per carry. However, he finished the midway point of the season with 46 receptions, the most by any running back in the league.

At the midway point of the season, Bush had yet to score a touchdown either receiving or running the ball; however, on November 12, 2006, Bush rushed for his first touchdown from scrimmage on a reverse against the Pittsburgh Steelers. On December 3, Bush tied the Saints' single-game touchdown record, held by Joe Horn, by scoring four touchdowns against the San Francisco 49ers. He gained 168 all-purpose yards as he sparked the Saints to their eighth win of the season. On December 10, Bush scored a 62-yard touchdown against the Dallas Cowboys in Dallas, contributing to the Saints' 42–17 drubbing of the Cowboys in what was expected to be a more competitive matchup that would be important to the playoff race. On December 24, Bush scored a one-yard touchdown on a reverse against the New York Giants. Bush also had a career-high 126 rushing yards on the day. On December 31, Bush scored a one-yard touchdown against the Carolina Panthers but carried the ball only three times, even though backfield counterpart Deuce McAllister did not play. This was because the New Orleans Saints had already clinched the No. 2 NFC seed in the playoffs.

In the NFC Divisional Playoff game on January 13, 2007, Bush ran for 52 yards on twelve carries and scored a touchdown, and added three catches for 22 yards, as New Orleans edged the Philadelphia Eagles 27–24 to earn its first NFC Championship Game appearance in the team's 40-year history. The game was also notable for the vicious hit that Bush absorbed from Sheldon Brown while attempting to catch a swing pass on the Saints' first play of the game. On January 21, in the NFC Championship playoff game, Bush caught a pass on the 22 and ran 78 yards downfield (eluding the Chicago Bears safety) for an 88-yard touchdown thrown by Drew Brees. This comeback was the first score of the second half and closed the gap from 16–7 (in favor of Chicago) to 16–14. That was the last time, however, the Saints would score. The Bears went on to trounce the Saints 39–14 to earn a berth to the Super Bowl.

Bush was fined by the NFL after the game for US$5,000 for taunting: which consisted of wagging his finger at All-Pro linebacker Brian Urlacher and doing a somersault after the 88-yard reception score. Bush apologized immediately after the event.

==== 2007 season ====
In the season opener of the 2007 season, Bush and the Saints lost to the defending Super Bowl champion Indianapolis Colts 41–10. Bush was tied for a team-best 38 rushing yards on 12 carries. He also had seven yards on four receptions and a punt return for two yards in a disappointing opener for him and the Saints. Their next game was equally disappointing, as the Saints were beaten 31–14 by the Tampa Bay Buccaneers and Bush averaged 2.7 yards per carry and 27 yards from scrimmage – over a third of which came on one play.

Bush scored two rushing touchdowns, both one-yard runs, in the Saints' Week 3 loss to the Tennessee Titans. In that game, Bush carried seven times for 15 yards while catching six passes for 20 yards. Bush missed the final four games of the 2007 season with a partially torn posterior cruciate ligament in his left knee. Bush finished the season with six total touchdowns and 581 yards rushing, averaging 3.6 yards per carry.

==== 2008 season ====
Bush and the New Orleans Saints faced the Tampa Bay Buccaneers to open the 2008 season. With Deuce McAllister out due to injury, Bush started the game. He showed great improvement early in the season, particularly during Week 3 against the Denver Broncos, in which he had 18 carries for 73 yards and two touchdowns, one touchdown that included a run up the middle, cutting back to the outside for 23 yards. He added a second touchdown on a six-yard swing pass from Drew Brees near the goal line. Bush ended the game with eleven receptions for 75 yards and one receiving touchdown.

Since he came into the league, no running back has caught more passes out of the backfield than Bush, who collected 171 receptions in his first two years. On October 6, in a home game against the Minnesota Vikings, he returned two punts for touchdowns and nearly had a third, tying an NFL record for single-game punt returns for touchdowns and becoming the 12th player to do so. In a home game against the Oakland Raiders on October 12, Bush tied the NFL record for fastest time to his 200th catch, doing so in only 34 games.

Bush was injured in the October 19 game against the Carolina Panthers. He had surgery to repair a torn meniscus in his left knee the next day and was expected to miss the next three to four games. Bush returned on November 30 against the Tampa Bay Buccaneers and registered three carries for no yards and five catches for 32 yards in a 23–20 Saints loss. However, one week later he was back on track, producing over 100 yards from scrimmage and a touchdown catch in an important 29–25 home win against the division rival Atlanta Falcons to keep the Saints' slim playoff hopes alive.

On December 11, Bush sprained his medial collateral ligament in his left knee in the Saints' 27–24 overtime loss on the road against the Chicago Bears. Although diagnosed as a sprain, given that it was the same knee he had surgery on earlier in the year – and that the Saints were now out of the playoff picture with only two games left in the 2008 season – Bush was placed on injured reserve, ending his season early for the second year in a row. He finished the season with 404 rushing yards on 106 carries, 440 yards receiving with 52 receptions and nine total touchdowns, playing in ten games. Bush was additionally named First Team All-Pro as a punt returner after finishing the season with 20 punt returns for 270 yards and three touchdowns.

On January 7, 2009, the New Orleans Saints confirmed that Bush had surgery on his left knee, and would require months of rehabilitation. However, Bush was expected to be ready for minicamp in June.

==== 2009 Super Bowl season ====
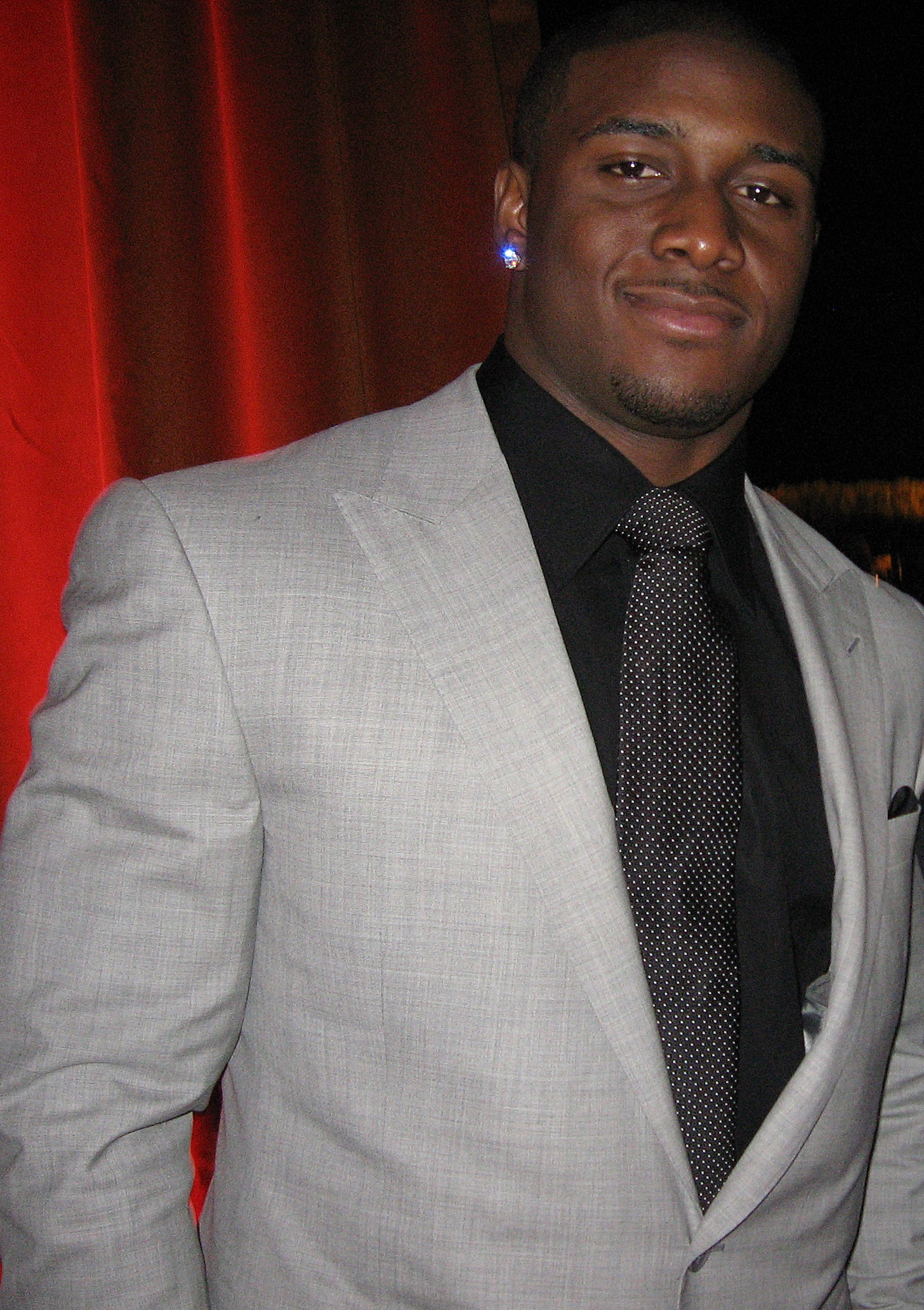
Bush in 2009

On August 16, 2009, Bush left practice due to continuing problems with his left knee, later to return with his knee wrapped in an icepack. Bush and the Saints said that he iced the knee as a precaution. Bush missed the last three games of the 2009 preseason due to a calf injury and to rest his surgically repaired knee. Team officials called it precautionary in nature and stated that Bush would be ready to play during the regular season.

Bush missed games in Weeks 11 and 12 of the regular season due to soreness in his surgically repaired knee. He also missed most of game 15 due to a minor hamstring injury.

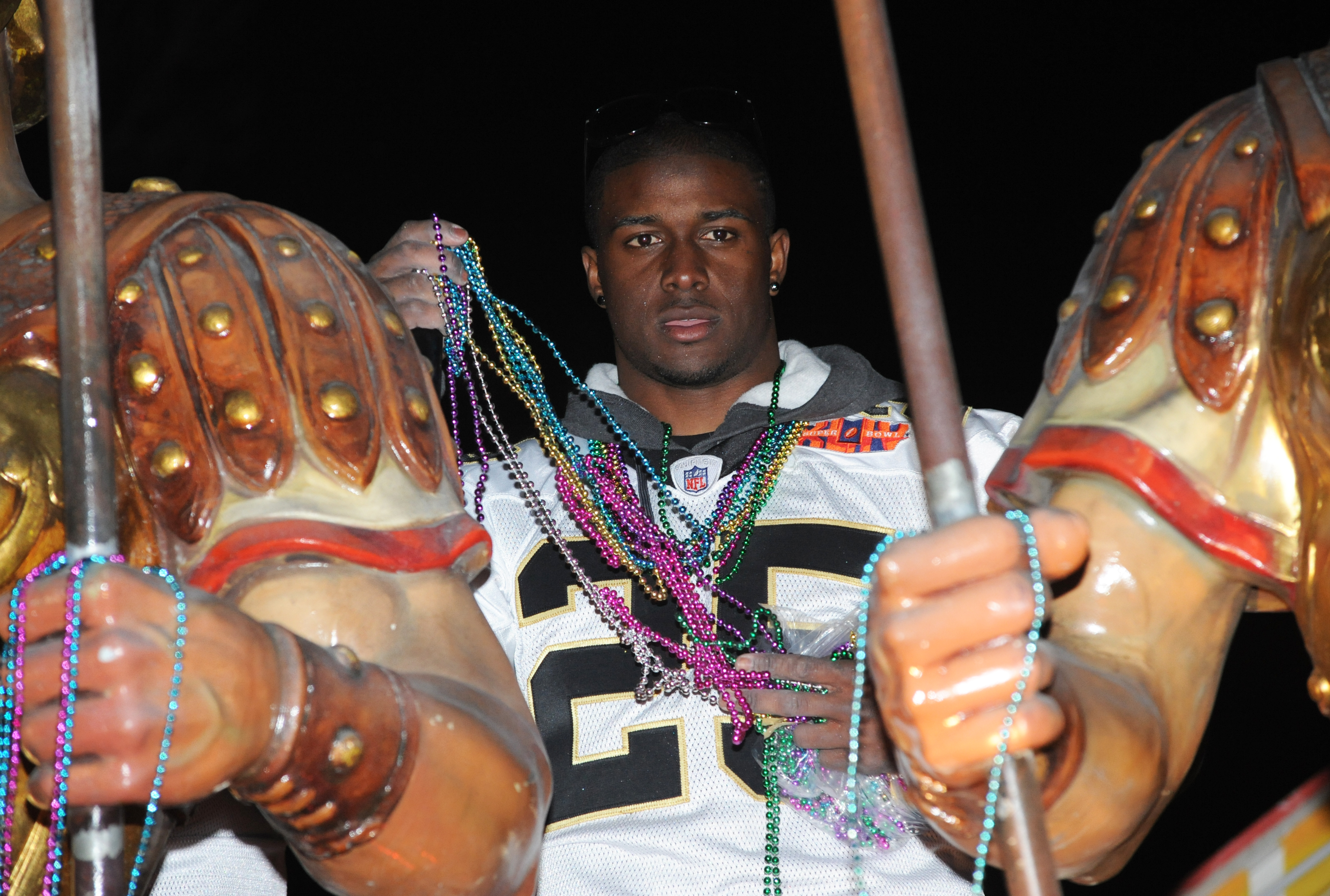
Bush at the Saints' Super Bowl XLIV victory parade.

Bush experienced career lows in every major category for the 2009 season. While he had eight total touchdowns, good for third on the team, Bush was used sparingly during the year due to Mike Bell and Pierre Thomas dominating the backfield carries. Bush ended the year playing in 14 games with 70 carries for 390 yards and five touchdowns, and 47 receptions for 335 yards and three touchdowns.

On January 16, 2010, in the NFC divisional playoff game against the Arizona Cardinals, Bush had one of the best games of his professional career. He rushed for 84 yards on only five carries, including a 46-yard touchdown run. This play was the longest run by a New Orleans Saints player in the postseason. He also added an 83-yard punt return touchdown late in the third quarter, the Saints' last score in their 45–14 win.

In the NFC Championship Game against the Minnesota Vikings on January 24, Bush had only eight yards rushing on seven carries with two receptions for 33 yards, and he fumbled a punt return. However, one of his receptions was a late touchdown that helped the Saints win their first NFC championship and their first Super Bowl appearance and eventual victory in franchise history. On February 7, 2010, Bush won his first Super Bowl with a 31–17 win over the Indianapolis Colts in Miami.

==== 2010 season ====
Bush's 2010 season was overshadowed by the controversy over his Heisman Trophy, as well as other matters related to his years at USC. During the second regular-season game, a Monday Night Football contest with the San Francisco 49ers, he was injured while returning a punt. He did not return to the game. The injury was diagnosed as a broken bone in his right leg and he was expected to miss at least six weeks. He returned on Thanksgiving Day to play against the Dallas Cowboys. Overall, he finished the 2010 season with 150 rushing yards and 34 receptions for 208 yards and a receiving touchdown.

=== Miami Dolphins ===
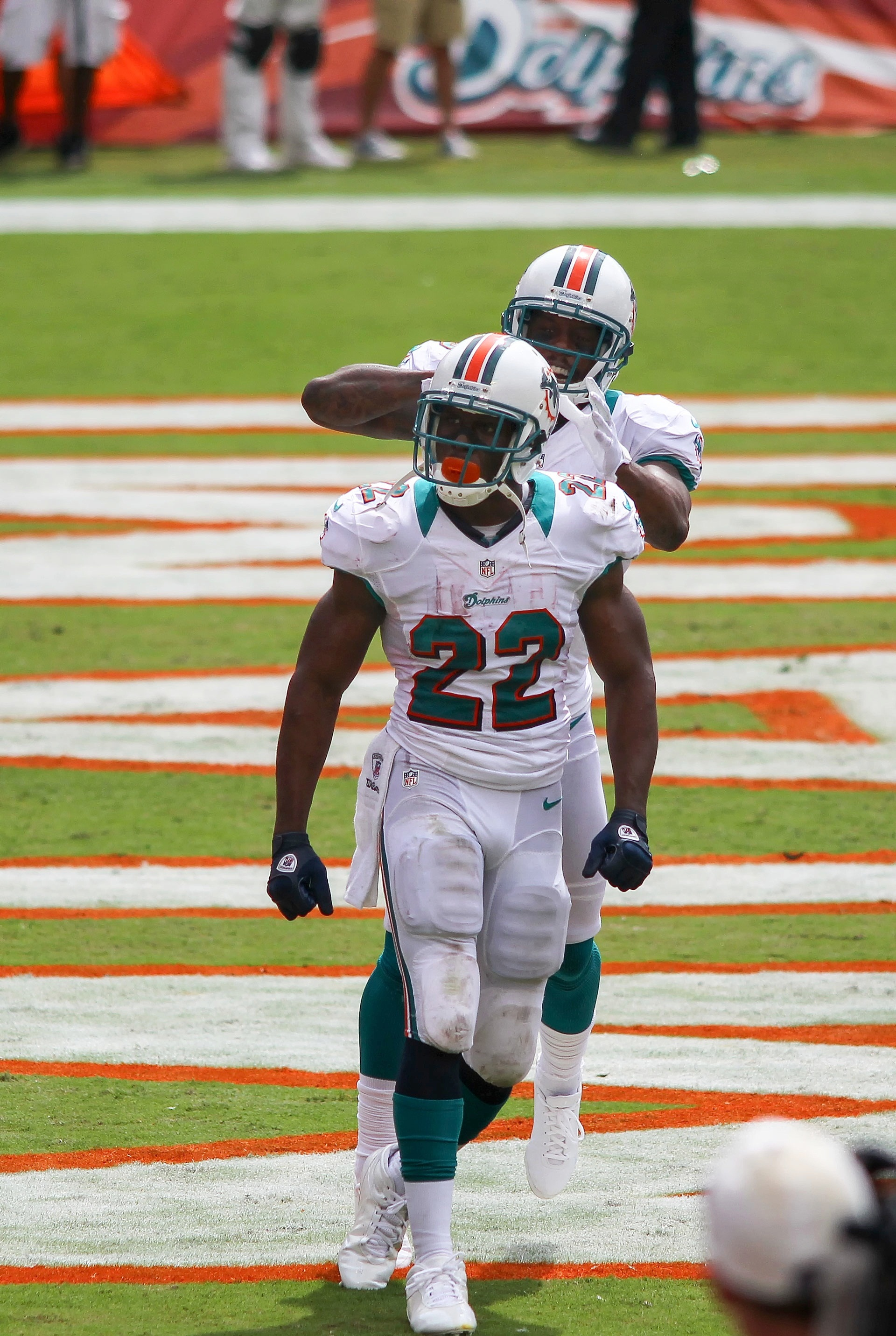
Bush with the Miami Dolphins during the 2012 season

==== 2011 season ====
On July 28, 2011, the Saints traded Bush to the Miami Dolphins for reserve safety Jonathon Amaya and a swap of sixth-round draft picks. After an 0–7 start, during the Dolphins' first win of the 2011 season against the Kansas City Chiefs, Bush scored his first rushing touchdown since 2009. Bush had his second career 100-yard game against the New York Giants with 103 yards on 15 carries in the 20–17 loss. In Week 13, Bush rushed 22 times for 100 yards and a touchdown on 22 carries in a 34–14 win over the Oakland Raiders.

Bush again eclipsed the 100-yard mark in a 26–10 loss to the Philadelphia Eagles the following week, rushing for 103 yards on 14 carries. On December 18, Bush rushed for a career-high 203 yards and a touchdown on 25 carries in a 30–23 win over the Buffalo Bills in Week 15. Bush rushed for 113 yards on 22 carries on Christmas Eve in a losing effort at the New England Patriots. Early in the game, he eclipsed the 1,000-yard rushing mark in a season for the first time in his professional career. Overall, in the 2011 season, he finished with 1,086 rushing yards, six rushing touchdowns, 43 receptions, 296 receiving yards, and one receiving touchdown.

==== 2012 season ====
After a solid season opener against the Houston Texans with 14 carries for 69 rushing yards in the 30–10 loss, Bush broke out on the ground with 172 yards on a career-high 26 carries and two rushing touchdowns, as well as 25 receiving yards, in a 35–13 win over the Oakland Raiders. Bush was named AFC Offensive Player of the Week for Week 2, the second time since joining the Miami Dolphins, and third time in his career. In Week 15, against the Jacksonville Jaguars, he had 104 rushing yards in the 24–3 victory. In Week 16, against the Buffalo Bills, he had 65 rushing yards, one rushing touchdown, and four receptions for 42 yards and two receiving touchdowns in the 24–10 victory. Overall, on the season, he had 986 rushing yards, six rushing touchdowns, 35 receptions, 292 receiving yards, and two receiving touchdowns.

=== Detroit Lions ===
==== 2013 season ====
Bush signed with the Detroit Lions on March 13, 2013. Bush's contract with the Lions was a four-year deal, worth $16 million with $4 million guaranteed. Yahoo! Sports' Jason Cole reported that Detroit planned to utilize Bush as a "three-down back" and Bush described playing for the Lions as a "running back's dream." He and Joique Bell shared the majority of the workload in the backfield. On his debut for the Lions against the Minnesota Vikings, he recorded 191 yards from scrimmage and a receiving touchdown. On September 29, against the Chicago Bears, he had 18 carries for 139 rushing yards and a rushing touchdown in the 40–32 victory in Week 4.

In Week 10, in the second divisional game against the Chicago Bears, he had 14 carries for 105 rushing yards in the 21–19 victory. In Week 13, against the Green Bay Packers, he had 20 carries for 117 rushing yards and a rushing touchdown in the 40–10 victory. Overall, on the 2013 season, he had 1,006 rushing yards, four rushing touchdowns, 54 receptions, 506 receiving yards, and three receiving touchdowns. He was ranked 85th by his fellow players on the NFL Top 100 Players of 2014.

==== 2014 season ====
The 2014 season saw Bush's production drop as Bell's production increased. His first rushing touchdown of the season came against the Green Bay Packers in Week 3 as part of a season-high 61-yard performance in the 19–7 victory. He only topped 50 rushing yards once more and scored one more rushing touchdown, which came against the Chicago Bears in Week 16, in the 2014 season. Overall, he finished with 297 rushing yards, two rushing touchdowns, 40 receptions, and 253 receiving yards. The Lions made the playoffs and faced off against the Dallas Cowboys in the Wild Card Round. In the 24–20 loss, he had an 18-yard rushing touchdown in the first quarter.

On February 25, 2015, Bush was released by the Lions.

=== San Francisco 49ers ===
On March 18, 2015, Bush signed with the San Francisco 49ers. His one-year contract was for $2.5 million, with $500,000 guaranteed, and a $500,000 signing bonus. He joined a very crowded backfield that contained Carlos Hyde and Shaun Draughn. On September 14, 2015, in the 49ers season opener against the Minnesota Vikings, Bush left the game with a leg injury. On November 1, 2015, during a game against the St. Louis Rams, Bush slipped on the concrete surrounding the field at the Edward Jones Dome and crashed into the wall. He suffered a season-ending tear of his left meniscus. In limited action, he had eight carries for 28 rushing yards and four receptions for 19 receiving yards on the 2015 season.

On January 8, 2016, it was announced that Bush sued the St. Louis Rams, St. Louis Regional Convention and Sports Complex Authority and the St. Louis Convention and Visitors Commission, contending that what he described as a "concrete ring of death" around the field caused his injury. On June 13, 2018, the St. Louis Post-Dispatch reported that Bush had won the lawsuit and that the Rams were ordered to pay Bush $12.45 million in damages: $4.95 million in compensatory damages and $7.5 million in punitive damages. In making the ruling, the judge left the Rams as the sole defendant, dismissing the convention authority and sports complex from the suit.

=== Buffalo Bills ===
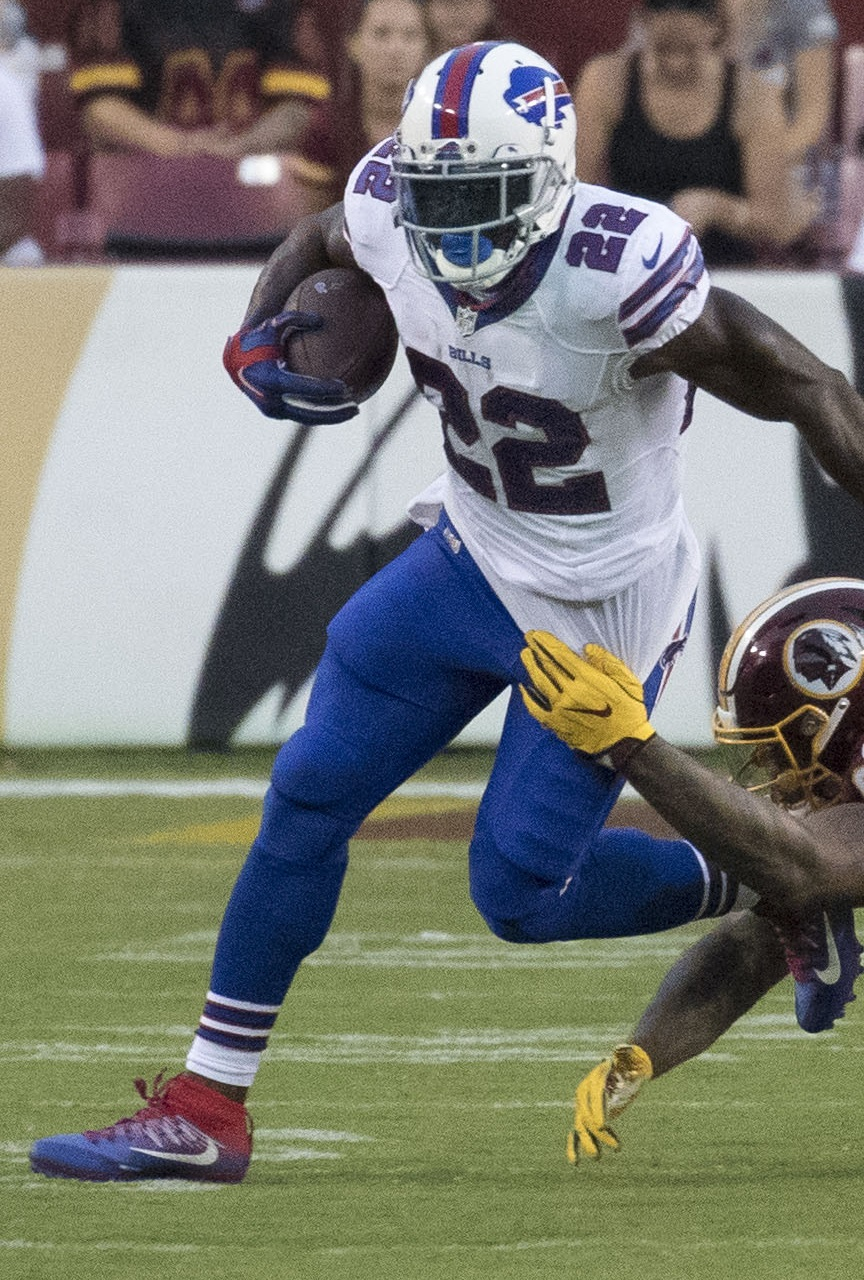
Bush playing for the Buffalo Bills in 2016

On August 1, 2016, Bush signed with the Buffalo Bills on a one-year deal. He joined a backfield that was dominated by LeSean McCoy and Mike Gillislee. Bush rushed for his first touchdown, and only rushing touchdown of the season, with the Bills on October 23, 2016, in a 28–25 loss to the Miami Dolphins. Bush finished the season with seven catches for 90 yards, and 12 carries for −3 yards and a rushing touchdown, making him the first player in NFL history, other than quarterbacks, to carry the ball at least ten times and have negative yardage for a season.

=== Retirement ===
On December 15, 2017, Bush announced his retirement from the NFL.

Bush finished his career with 5,490 rushing yards, 3,598 receiving yards, 929 return yards, and 58 touchdowns.

On June 5, 2019, Bush was inducted into the New Orleans Saints Hall of Fame.

== Career statistics ==
=== NFL ===
Legend
	Won the Super Bowl
	Led the league
**Bold**	Career high

Year	Team	Games		Rushing					Receiving					Punt returns					Kick returns					Fumbles	
Year	Team	GP	GS	Att	Yds	Avg	Lng	TD	Rec	Yds	Avg	Lng	TD	Ret	Yds	Avg	Lng	TD	Ret	Yds	Avg	Lng	TD	Fum	Lost
2006	NO	**16**	8	155	565	3.6	18	**6**	**88**	**742**	8.4	74	2	**28**	216	7.7	65	1	—	—	—	—	—	2	2
2007	NO	12	10	157	581	3.7	22	4	73	417	5.7	25	2	3	12	4.0	10	0	—	—	—	—	—	**7**	3
2008	NO	10	9	106	404	3.8	43	2	52	440	8.5	42	**4**	20	**270**	**13.5**	**71**	**3**	—	—	—	—	—	3	2
2009	NO	14	8	70	390	**5.6**	55	5	47	335	7.1	29	3	27	130	4.8	23	0	—	—	—	—	—	2	1
2010	NO	8	6	36	150	4.2	23	0	34	208	6.1	20	1	14	92	6.6	43	0	1	32	**32.0**	32	0	0	0
2011	MIA	15	15	216	**1,086**	5.0	**76**	**6**	43	296	6.9	34	1	6	52	8.7	16	0	—	—	—	—	—	4	2
2012	MIA	**16**	**16**	**227**	986	4.3	65	**6**	35	292	8.3	25	2	—	—	—	—	—	—	—	—	—	—	4	2
2013	DET	14	14	223	1,006	4.5	39	4	54	506	9.4	**77**	3	—	—	—	—	—	—	—	—	—	—	5	**4**
2014	DET	11	9	76	297	3.9	26	2	40	253	6.3	28	0	—	—	—	—	—	—	—	—	—	—	0	0
2015	SF	5	1	8	28	3.5	9	0	4	19	4.8	8	0	2	9	4.5	9	0	—	—	—	—	—	0	0
2016	BUF	13	0	12	−3	−0.3	5	1	7	90	**12.9**	25	0	2	13	6.5	13	0	**5**	**103**	20.6	**35**	0	1	0
Total		134	96	1,291	5,490	4.3	76	36	477	3,598	7.5	77	18	102	794	7.8	71	4	6	135	22.5	35	0	27	16

=== College ===
Legend
	Heisman Trophy
	Won the CFP National Championship
	Led the NCAA
**Bold**	Career high

Season	Team	GP	Rushing				Receiving				Kick returns				Punt returns			
Season	Team	GP	Att	Yds	Avg	TD	Rec	Yds	Avg	TD	Ret	Yds	Avg	TD	Ret	Yds	Avg	TD
2003	USC	13	90	521	5.8	3	15	314	**20.9**	4	18	492	**27.3**	**1**	2	4	2.0	0
2004	USC	13	143	908	6.3	6	**43**	**509**	11.8	**7**	21	**537**	25.6	0	**24**	**376**	**15.7**	**2**
2005	USC	13	**200**	**1,740**	**8.7**	**16**	37	478	12.9	2	**28**	493	17.6	0	18	179	9.9	1
Total		39	433	3,169	7.3	25	95	1,301	13.7	13	67	1522	22.7	1	44	559	12.7	3

== Awards and honors ==
NFL

- Super Bowl champion (XLIV)
- First-team All-Pro (2008)
- NFL PFWA All-Rookie Team (2006)
- New Orleans Saints Hall of Fame
- Ranked No. 85 in the Top 100 Players of 2014

College

- BCS national champion (2004) (Note: The championship was later vacated by the BCS on June 6, 2011, following the imposition of sanctions by the NCAA, including vacation of games during the 2004 season.)
- 2× AP national champion (2003, 2004)
- Heisman Trophy (2005)
- Walter Camp Award (2005)
- AP College Football Player of the Year (2005)
- Sporting News Player of the Year (2005)
- 2× Chic Harley Award (2004, 2005)
- Doak Walker Award (2005)
- Jim Brown Trophy (2005)
- 2× Consensus All-American (2004, 2005)
- 2× Pac-10 Offensive Player of the year (2004, 2005)
- 2× First-team All-Pac-10 (2004, 2005)
- USC Trojans No. 5 retired

== Media career ==
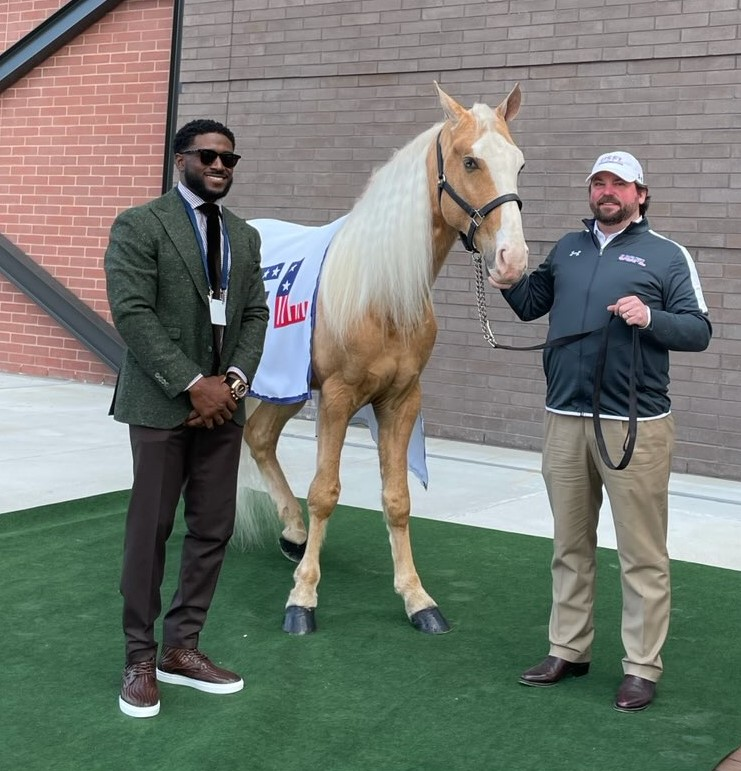
Bush posing with the United States Football League's Birmingham Stallions mascot in 2022

In February 2007, Bush appeared as Ciara's love interest in the music video for her single, "Like a Boy".

On June 26, 2007, David Beckham's first major US television advertising campaign since joining the Los Angeles Galaxy debuted via the internet. Titled "Futbol Meets Football", it paired Beckham with Bush in a 12-part video series, with additional television, radio and online promotion by Adidas.

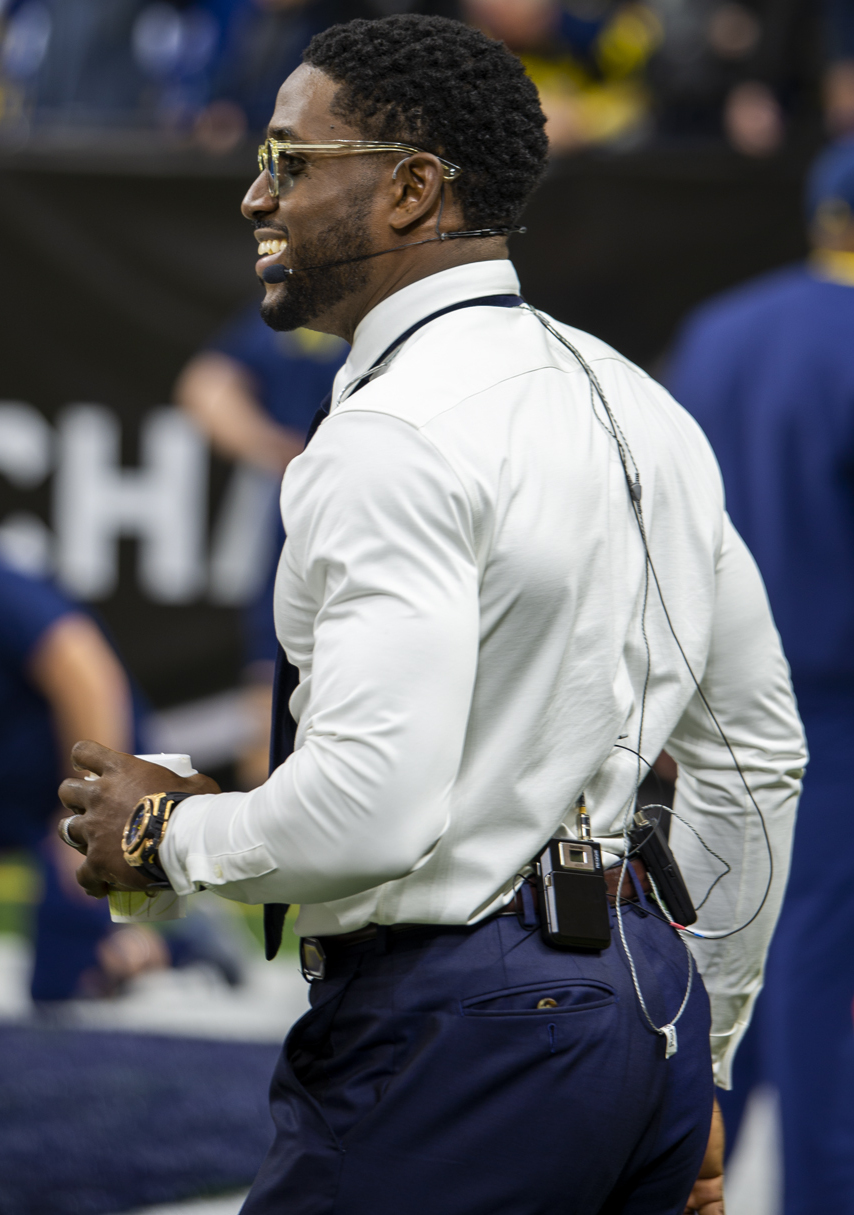
Bush in 2021

In August 2007, he signed a deal with Sirius Satellite Radio to be a weekly announcer for the 2007 season.

Bush was nominated for Male Athlete of the Year at the 2007 and 2009 BET Awards.

Bush in a public service announcement for the State of California thanking essential workers on International Workers' Day 2020.

Bush was featured almost shirtless on the February 2010 cover of Essence for the theme "Black Men, Love & Relationships." However, this appearance generated controversy as some among the magazine's readers took offense to Bush on the cover of such an issue; at the time he was involved with Kim Kardashian and Bush was criticized for dating only non-black women.

Also in 2010, Bush's fundraising work for organizations that benefit Haiti and diamond-producing countries in Africa earned him a nomination for the VH1 Do Something Awards. Specifically, Bush worked on behalf of the Diamond Empowerment Fund, visiting Botswana and South Africa and raising money for education there. He is a founding member of the Fund's Athletes for Africa program. The awards show, produced by VH1, is dedicated to honoring people who do good and is powered by Do Something, an organization that aims to empower, celebrate, and inspire young people.

In March 2012, Bush became a partner and spokesperson for skincare company Barc, makers of BumpDown Razor Bump Relief.

In 2018, Bush appeared as a contestant on Talk Show the Game Show with Guy Branum.

In 2019, Bush signed on with Fox Sports as a college football analyst for their Big Noon Kickoff pregame show. He left the show in 2023 when they could not come to an agreement on his next contract.

In October 2022, he signed an ambassador deal with golf brand Srixon.

On September 24, 2024, it was reported he is suing USC, the Pac-12 Conference and the NCAA for illegal use of his name' image and likeness without permission nor compensation.

== Personal life ==
At one time, Bush dated Kim Kardashian while at USC, after Matt Leinart introduced them at the 2007 ESPY Awards. The pair were reported as having gotten back together on September 28, 2009. Bush was romantically linked to country singer Jessie James Decker in 2010.

Bush began dating Armenian dancer Lilit Avagyan in 2011 and the two married on July 12, 2014. The couple have three children: daughter, Briseis (born May 6, 2013) and sons, Uriah (born July 12, 2015) and Agyemang (born September 2, 2017).

== See also ==
- List of college football yearly rushing leaders
