= Nevin Shapiro =

American fraudster

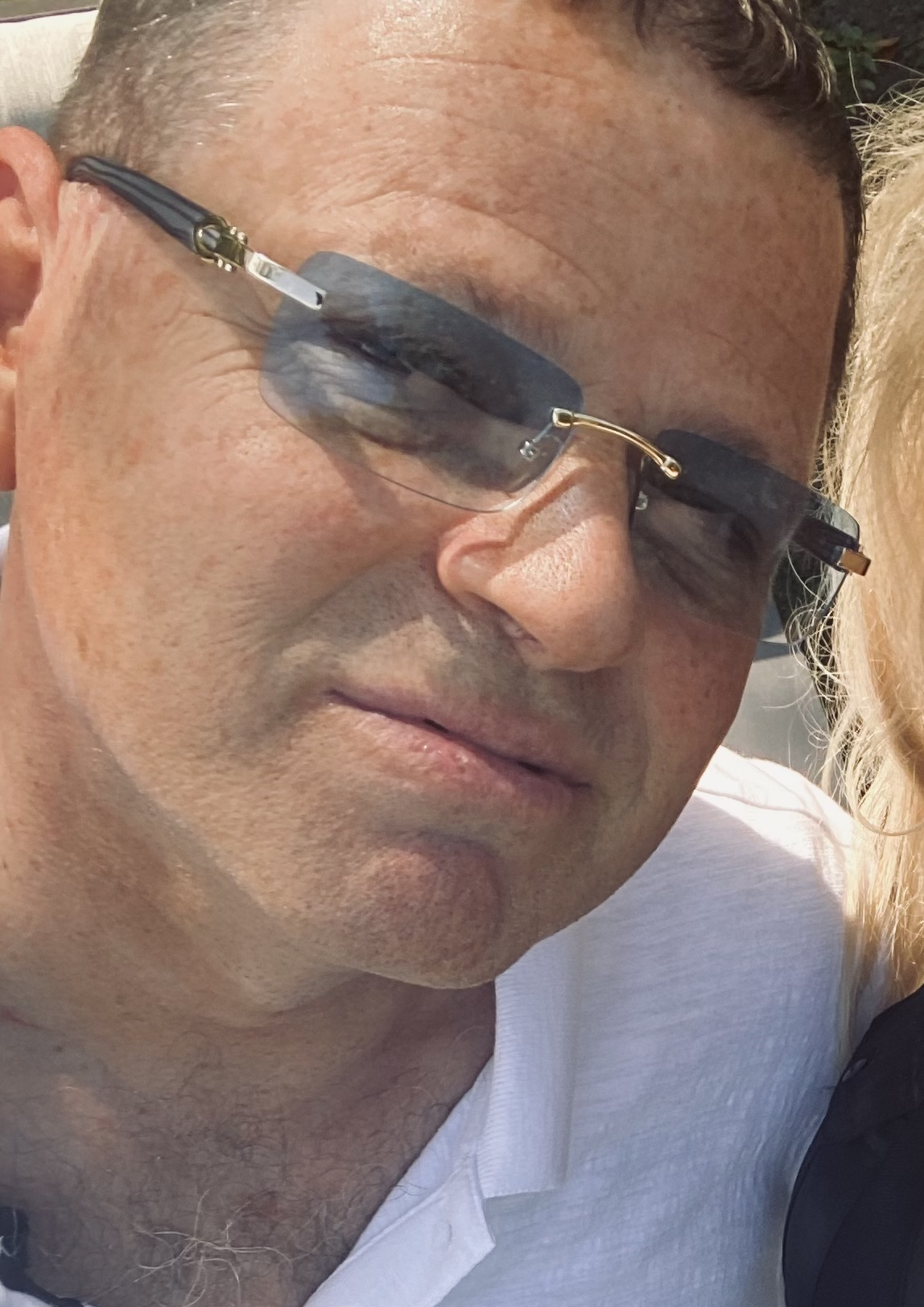
- Shapiro in 2020
- Born: April 13, 1969 (age 57); Brooklyn, New York City, U.S.
- Known for: Former University of Miami Booster 2001-2010

Nevin Karey Shapiro (born April 13, 1969) is an American fraudster who received a 20-year prison sentence for orchestrating a $930 million Ponzi scheme. The remainder of Shapiro's sentence was commuted by President Joe Biden in December 2024. According to interviews, he allegedly engaged in rampant violations of NCAA rules over eight years as a booster for University of Miami athletes. Shapiro allegedly provided football players cash, goods, prostitutes, and assorted favors.

== Early life and education ==
Shapiro was born in Brooklyn on April 13, 1969, to a Jewish family and moved with his family to Miami Beach, Florida at an early age. He graduated in 1986 from Miami Beach Senior High School. Shapiro was a member of the school's basketball and wrestling teams.

== Ponzi scheme ==
=== Federal criminal allegations ===
Shapiro started Capitol Investments USA, which he claimed bought wholesale groceries and shipped them to more expensive markets, although he said that he never actually sold the groceries. Shapiro's Ponzi scheme was based on attracting investors to Capitol Investments. He promised investors they would make 10 to 26 percent commissions every month.

In 2003, his business grew quickly through connections with Sherwin Jarol in Chicago, Craig Currie in New Jersey, and Sydney "Jack" Williams, who had real estate in Naples, Florida and Indianapolis.

According to FBI Special Agent Gregory Yankow in a Federal Criminal Complaint dated April 20, 2010 (Case No. 10-8082), Shapiro "directed others to create and show to the investors documents fraudulently touting Capitol's profitability. Those documents included: financial statements; profit and loss figures fraudulently representing that Capitol's wholesale grocery business was generating tens of millions of dollars in annual sales; personal and business tax returns for Shapiro and Capitol also fraudulently reflecting those sales; and numerous invoices fraudulently reflecting transactions between Capitol and other companies in the wholesale grocery business."

According to the criminal complaint, Shapiro incurred "millions of dollars in debts resulting from illegal gambling on sporting events; more than $400,000 for floor seats to the Miami Heat professional basketball team; approximately $26,000 monthly for mortgage payments on his residence in Miami Beach, which was recently appraised at approximately $5.3 million; approximately $7,250 monthly for payments on a $1.5 million Riviera yacht; approximately $4,700 monthly for the lease of a Mercedes-Benz automobile;" and an undisclosed amount "for a pair of diamond-studded handcuffs, which he gifted to a prominent professional athlete."

The FBI reported that he had diverted $35 million for his personal use from 2005 to 2009. Shapiro allegedly rented his yacht to NBA players Shaquille O'Neal, Dwyane Wade, and Kevin Garnett and pledged $150,000 to the University of Miami to have his name placed on the student lounge.

The scheme fell apart in November 2009 during the 2008-09 recession when Chicago real estate investor Sherwin Jarol sued to force him into involuntary bankruptcy after Shapiro had stopped making payments to his investors. More than 60 investors, largely from Naples, Indianapolis, and Chicago, including Barry Alvarez, had invested $600,000 in the scheme.

=== Federal criminal charges ===
On April 21, 2010, he was charged in New Jersey with securities fraud and money laundering.

=== Federal plea and sentencing ===
On September 15, 2010, he pleaded guilty before U.S. District Judge Susan D. Wigenton in Newark, New Jersey in U.S. v. Shapiro, 10-cr-00471, to one count of securities fraud and one count of money laundering. On June 7, 2011, he was sentenced to 20 years in federal prison and ordered to make $82,657,362.29 in restitution.

=== Home transfer ===
Shapiro was transferred from federal prison to home confinement on June 11, 2020, where he will continue to serve out the remainder of his 20-year sentence under monitoring by the Federal Bureau of Prisons (BOP). The transfer comes on the heels of recent federal prison directives to move some at-risk inmates to home confinement in the face of COVID-19 outbreaks. Shapiro, who was 51 at the time, was aided by having served over 50 percent of his sentence, while also demonstrating hypertrophic cardiomyopathy and hypertension, both of which put him at a higher risk of life-threatening complication if he were to contract coronavirus.

Shapiro was transferred to the home of a family member. He was to be monitored electronically by the Bureau of Prisons and subject to a range of the bureau's guidelines, which included a ban on the consumption of alcohol, random drug testing, and a monitored walking radius near the residence, and other criteria. He was also required to wear an ankle monitor at all times. He remained eligible to hold a job, although any work would require approval through the bureau and his earnings were garnished to repay remaining restitution to his victims.

Shapiro also faces a civil case in Miami, U.S. Securities and Exchange Commission v. Shapiro, 10-cv-21281.

Capitol Investments USA, Inc. was placed into involuntary Chapter 7 bankruptcy in the United States Bankruptcy Court for the Southern District of Florida before Judge Laurel M. Isicoff, after Chicago investor Sherwin Jarol filed a petition alleging Shapiro was concealing assets. Miami attorney Joel Tabas of Tabas Freedman was appointed as bankruptcy trustee and pursued clawback actions against financial institutions and professional firms that had facilitated or failed to detect the fraud. The trustee's recoveries included a $5.9 million settlement with Bank of America and a $5 million settlement with Greenberg Traurig LLP. Additional recovery litigation was handled by firms including Shook, Hardy & Bacon LLP, Levine Kellogg Lehman Schneider + Grossman LLP, Law Office of Mark S. Roher, and the Law Office of Maria Elena Perez, representing various creditor and investor interests throughout the proceedings.

=== Commutation ===
In December 2024, President Joe Biden commuted Shapiro's sentence, which the Department of Justice stressed "does not imply forgiveness of the underlying offense, but simply remits a portion of the punishment." He was officially listed as released on December 22.

== University of Miami scandal ==
In 2002, Shapiro paid $1.5 million for a 30 percent stake in a sports management company called Axcess Sports, founded by Michael Huyghue. The agency signed several Miami Hurricanes football players, including Vince Wilfork.

In August 2010, Shapiro told the Miami Herald that he was writing a book The Real U: 2001 to 2010 Inside the Eye of the Hurricane in which he promised to tell how the University of Miami had violated NCAA rules affecting more than 100 players. "Once the players turned pro, they turned their back on me. It made me feel like a used friend," he said. Shapiro was reported to have spent $2 million from 2002 to 2010 boosting University of Miami sports, primarily football, but also included contact with the basketball team under Frank Haith.

On August 16, 2011, in a jailhouse interview with Yahoo! sports writer Charles Robinson conducted over 100 hours, Shapiro made good on his promise for revelations, exposing a lack of NCAA-mandated institutional oversight at the university that apparently allowed his illegal and unethical behavior to continue unimpeded for years. To date, 72 University of Miami football players are alleged by Shapiro to have received impermissible benefits from him between 2002 and 2010, including Wilfork, Jon Beason, Antrel Rolle, Devin Hester, Willis McGahee, Sean Taylor.

Photos in the Yahoo article showed Shapiro with Kellen Winslow Jr. and Joe Kolchinsky in the VIP section of the Opium Garden Nightclub in 2005, with Haith, Joe Kolchinsky and University of Miami President Donna Shalala in 2008 as he donated $50,000 to the basketball program as well as $3 million in other donations to undisclosed recipients, and with Vince Wilfork in 2002.

In response to the allegations, the University of Miami imposed significant penalties on itself, including the suspension of eight football players, and removed itself from post-season bowl contention for one year.

On October 22, 2013, after a two-and-a-half year of investigation, the NCAA announced that the University of Miami football team would be docked three scholarships in each of the next three seasons, a three-year probation, recruiting restrictions, a five-game suspension for the Miami Hurricanes men's basketball coach, and a two-year show-cause order on a total of three former assistant football and basketball coaches. Considering such a long investigation yielded very little incriminating evidence, it was widely viewed that the NCAA investigation and the media attention to the case did not match the relatively minor infractions that were proven to be committed.

Before the NCAA penalties were announced, it was revealed that NCAA enforcement staff paid Shapiro's lawyer $25,000 to call in University of Miami personnel during an unassociated legal deposition for Shapiro's bankruptcy, and ask a specific list of questions related to the university's scandal. Shapiro's attorney used her subpoena power in the bankruptcy case to question two witnesses who were crucial to the NCAA's case. The NCAA had no subpoena power, and neither witness had any obligation to talk to the association. The backlash from the revelations about the NCAA's activities, coupled with the university's unprecedented self-imposed sanctions, helped the Miami Hurricanes escape additional harsh NCAA penalties.
