= Hiram Clarke, Houston =

Area in Texas, United States

Coordinates: 29.627757°N 95.446108°W

Hiram Clarke is an area in Houston, Texas, United States, southwest of NRG Park (formerly Reliant Park).

== History ==
Hiram Clarke Road was named after Hiram Clarke, a Houston Lighting & Power Co. assistant general manager and executive vice president. The Hiram Clarke area was annexed by Houston in the 1950s.

The community originally consisted primarily of middle-class white residents, many of whom worked in the Texas Medical Center. As white flight to more suburban areas became the norm of the 1970s, racial and ethnic minorities replaced the original white residents. Black residents moving from inner city communities such as Fifth Ward and, later, Hispanic immigrants settled into the community. Many of the Hispanic residents initially apartment-shared as a money-saving device and later occupied single-family homes. Stephen Klineberg, a Rice University sociology professor, stated that the new residents, in close proximity to wealthier areas like Meyerland, are able to observe but not partake in the affluence of the areas.

With the development of the Corinthian Pointe Neighborhood, the area saw a boon of new construction and commercial development beginning in the mid-2000s and continuing into the present day—primarily along S. Post Oak Road. The newly developed homes were up to twice as large as the traditional ranch homes that covered the area.

In 1998, the area advocacy group South Houston Concerned Citizens Coalition received nonprofit status, so it could apply for grants to fund neighborhood projects and organize homebuyer fairs and community festivals.

In 2006, a parade honoring Vince Young occurred in Hiram Clarke.

== Boundaries ==
The area is primarily composed of the ZIP codes 77085, 77045, and 77047.

The ZIP code 77085, which covers an area similar to a triangle, roughly bounded by U.S. Route 90A (South Main), Hiram Clarke Road, and Beltway 8 (Sam Houston Tollway), saw the number of population rise to over 200% of its original population, between 2000 and 2010. Carol Christian of the Houston Chronicle said that the Windsor Village United Methodist Church was a primary factor.

The area is included in the Five Corners District, which was drawn by the 80th State Legislature, and is associated with a twelve year Service and Improvement Plan scheduled to run through 2022. The plan seeks to address crime reduction, control and prevention; business development; transportation planning; and beautification, visual improvement and cultural promotion in the Hiram Clarke and surrounding areas.

== Communities ==
The Hiram Clarke Civic Club serves portions of the area. The group's boundaries are West Airport Boulevard, Hiram Clarke Road, Landmark Street, and West Orem Drive. It has two subdivisions, with almost 1,200 households living in them. As of 2003 it had 175 members who paid dues. Matt Schwartz of the Houston Chronicle said "Even with dues of $50 a year, enforcing restrictions with letters from attorneys or lawsuits can quickly drain resources." One of the subdivisions it represents is Brentwood.

Other subdivisions in the Hiram Clarke area include:

- Cambridge Village
- Keswick Place
- Ramblewood

== Cityscape ==
Hiram Clarke is 5 miles (8.0 km) southwest of NRG Stadium and NRG Park (previously Reliant Stadium and Reliant Park), about a 13 minute commute. Most of the houses in the wider area were developed in the 1960s. Mimi Swartz of Texas Monthly said in 2006 that, compared to Meyerland, Hiram Clarke was "a world away from its comforts" and that "the ranch houses were much smaller, the windows had bars, and weeds choked the front yards." In 2019 John Nova Lomax, writing for Texas Monthly, referred to Swartz' comparison of Hiram Clarke and Meyerland.

== Government and infrastructure ==
=== Local government ===
As of 2011 Hiram Clarke is a part of Houston City Council District K. Previously it was served by District D.

Residents are a part of the City of Houston Central Southwest Super Neighborhood, which has a coverage area of 12,760 acres (5,160 ha). Its boundaries are U.S. Route 90A and Holmes Road on the north, Beltway 8 on the south, Texas State Highway 288 to the east, and Holmes Road to the west. It became a super neighborhood around 1999. It has forty separate neighborhoods.

The Houston Police Department serves Hiram Clarke through the Southwest Patrol Division. The Hiram Clarke Storefront is a part of the Southwest Patrol District. The South Houston Concerned Citizens Coalition had lobbied for the city to add a substation.

The City of Houston operates the Hiram Clarke Multi Service Center. The 42,000-square-foot (3,900 m^{2}) facility is located on an 8-acre (3.2 ha) site. Originally named the South Post Oak Multi-Service Center, it had a price tag of $10 million. It was scheduled to open at the end of 2008. Mayor of Houston Bill White, other city politicians, and other community figures attended the groundbreaking ceremony on Friday October 12, 2007. It was the City of Houston General Services Department's pilot project in combining several municipal functions in one site, lowering construction, design, and land acquisition expenses.

The city government designed the facility so it would get Leadership in Energy and Environmental Design (LEED) certification. To do this, the city installed low flow plumbing, roof overhangs, a metal roof, and high performance windows. The windows reduce heat absorption and allow natural light to enter the building. The complex includes a library facility, the Vinson library, a Head Start Center, office space for nonprofit organizations, an auditorium, youth program areas, elderly program areas, and a resource room. Sheila Savannah, the bureau chief of the City of Houston Department of Health and Human Services, said that the demographics of Hiram Clarke, with its mix of families and older, long-time inhabitants, made the community well-suited for a multi-service center.

=== County representation ===
Harris County Precinct 7 Constable patrols the community.

== Transportation ==
Metropolitan Transit Authority of Harris County (METRO) operates the Hiram Clarke Bus Operating Facility. When METRO received a $15.5 million federal fund package for transit upgrade, METRO announced that it will spend $8 million to complete renovations on the Hiram Clarke and Kashmere bus operating facilities.

METRO also operates the Hiram Clarke Transit Center. Several intersecting routes meet at the transit center. The METRO hired Del E. Webb Construction Services, a Phoenix, Arizona-based company to build the transit center. In the northern hemisphere spring of 1983, the staff of METRO examined the plans for the construction, then in-progress, and recommended a series of changes. METRO said that its recommendations would, over a period of 30 years, save $6 million. But because METRO demanded the changes, Webb had to perform work out of sequence, costing the company time and money. Webb said that the move forced $3.2 million in additional expenses on the company. About $700,000 of that figure would have gone to subcontractors working for Webb. METRO and Webb entered a legal dispute, which lasted three years until 1986, when METRO paid a $1.8 million settlement to Webb. In 1986, due to financial issues, METRO said that it was scaling back its plans for the transit center, then a planned project, due to financial issues at METRO.

== Health care ==
The southeast branch of the American Red Cross serves Hiram Clarke.

== Crime ==
Vince Young, an American football player who grew up in the area in the late nineties and early aughts and continues to live there today, described the area, in 2006, as "a real foul neighborhood." In 2006 Chip Brown of The Dallas Morning News described the area as being the "mean streets." In 2005 Dick Weiss of the New York Daily News described Hiram Clarke as "run-down" and "drug-infested". In 2005 Jennifer Floyd Engel of the Fort Worth Star Telegram referred to Weiss's assessment and added that Hiram Clarke was "written off as ghetto by almost everybody else." In 2005 Jessica Garrison of CSTV said that Hiram Clarke was "Houston's toughest neighborhood."

Vince Young added that "There may have been gangs, drugs and crime in my neighborhood. But we all had each other's back. It was always Hiram Clarke versus somebody else. When I was younger, it was either, 'You gonna hang with the guys or we're going to beat you every day.' That made me the physical guy I am now."

Mimi Swartz of Texas Monthly said in 2006 that 76% of deaths occurring in Hiram Clarke were associated with "destructive habits" including alcohol dependency and drug abuse.

In 2019, writer John Nova Lomax, in Texas Monthly, stated that Hiram Clarke "is not the worst neighborhood in Houston by a long stretch."

== Culture ==
The local hip hop name for Hiram Clarke is "the Clarke".

Around 1989 a haircut popular among youths in the area was called the "South Side fade". The haircut features a narrow path etched on the head in a long, straight line. Ananiaz Johnson, a 1989 graduate of James Madison High School quoted in a Houston Chronicle article, said that "It's named after our area because it's popular here. Generally people from this neighborhood have that part. It probably originated here, and Shuntel popularized it." Johnson referred to Shuntel Coco, a Houston Community College School of Cosmetology student. Shea Serrano of the Houston Press said that the rapper Big Mello was famous for "repping Hiram Clarke in the 90's[...]"

One of the cult icons of outsider music, rapper and producer Viper, is also associated with the neighborhood to which he moved at the age of six. One of his most notable albums, The Hiram Clarke Hustler (2009) describes his experiences from living there as well as mentions some of the local landmarks.

== Education ==
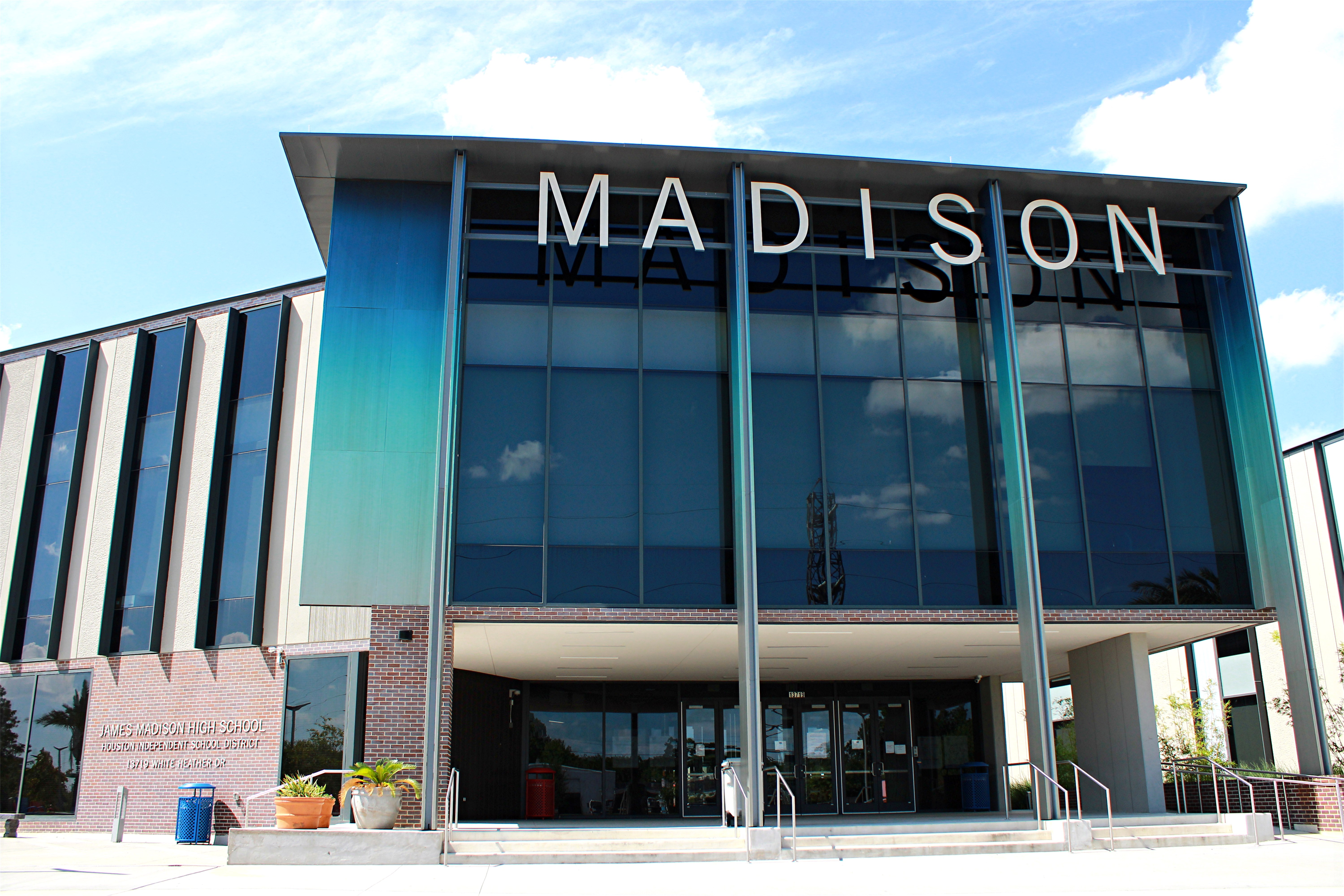
Madison High School

The Houston Independent School District operates district public schools.

Elementary schools serving portions of the Hiram Clarke area include Montgomery Elementary School, Grissom Elementary School, Hobby Elementary School, Petersen Elementary School, and Jean Hines-Caldwell Elementary School. Before the opening of Hines-Caldwell, Red Elementary School in Willowbend served a section of the Hiram Clarke area.

Audrey H. Lawson Middle School (formerly Dick Dowling Middle School) is located in the Hiram Clarke area. It opened on February 9, 1968. Frank Tritico had given the school district a paper highlighting the life of Richard William "Dick" Dowling, and therefore the district chose to name the school after him. It replaced the former junior high school component of Madison High School and had an initial enrollment of 1,107. At first it had grades 7-8, with the 9th grade opening in 1969. Its magnet program began on January 9, 1993, making it Richard W. Dowling Middle School of Fine Arts; the HISD board approved the establishment of the magnet program the previous November. As of 2009, 99% of the student body consists of racial and ethnic minorities. In 2016 the HISD board sought to rename schools named after officials in the Confederate States of America; it was renamed after Wheeler Avenue Baptist Church first lady Audrey H. Lawson that year. Groundbreaking for Lawson's new 1,500 student, $59 million, three-story campus occurred in September 2016. Madison High School is located in Hiram Clarke and serves residents of the Hiram Clarke area.

The charter school KIPP Sunnyside High School (KSHS) of KIPP Public Schools has some Hiram Clarke students.

Residents are also zoned to the Houston Community College system.

The Houston Public Library operates the Vinson Neighborhood Library at the Hiram Clarke Multi-Service Center. The library has traditional library services, a public reading room, an internet café, and HPL Express library services. The library was originally located at 3100 Fuqua; the city relocated it to the multi service center, where the library space had doubled in size from its previous location.

=== History of education ===
What is now Hiram Clarke became a part of HISD in 1938. Residents were initially zoned to Almeda School and San Jacinto High School. In the 1960s several new elementary schools opened, and in 1965 Madison High opened.

== Parks and recreation ==
Hiram Clarke is included in the service area of the Sam Houston Area Council Boy Scouts W.L. Davis District.

As of 2013, the area, along with a portion of Southeast Houston, comprises the South Bridge Community. It formerly comprised the San Jacinto Girl Scout Council's Sunshine Service Unit. It combined with a Southeast Houston service unit (Sunnyside's Edgewood Service Unit) in 2013.

== Notable residents ==
- Michael Arceneaux - Author of I Can't Date Jesus
- Viper (Lee Carter)
- Big Mello (Curtis Donnell Davis)
- LaToya Luckett (former member of the Destiny's Child)
- Vince Young
- César Cedeño (Professional Baseball Player for the Houston Astros). Resident of Cambridge Village in 1970s.
- Sid Blanks (Professional Football Player for the Houston Oilers). Resided in Cambridge Village on Trail Lake Lane late 1960s and 1970s.
- Jimmy Wynn (Professional Baseball Player for the Houston Astros). Resident in Cambridge Village late 1970s.
