= Madison High School (Houston) =

James Madison High School
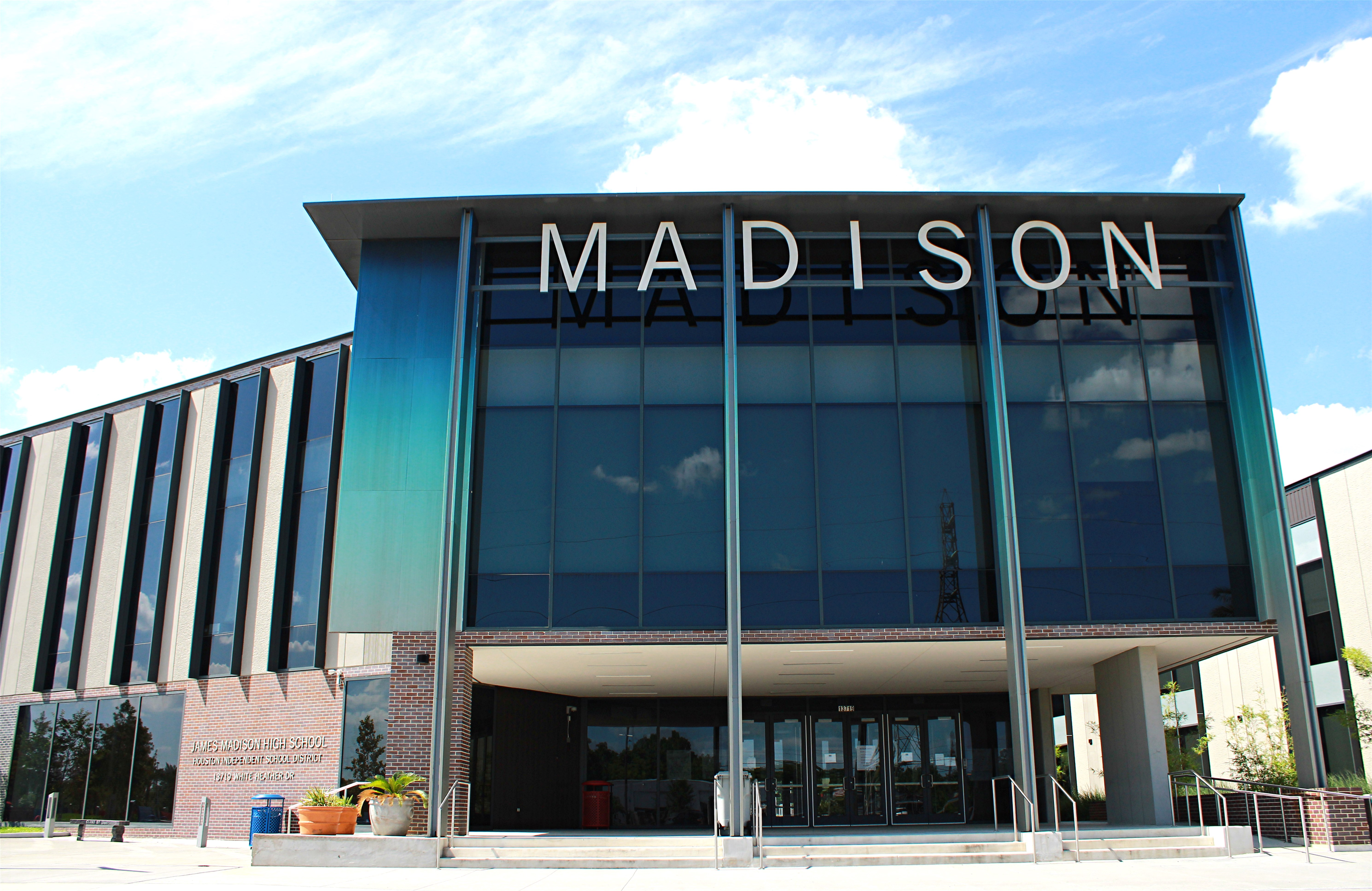
- Madison High School Entrance

Location
- 13719 White Heather Drive; Houston, Texas 77045; United States; 29.6299°N 95.43687°W

Information
- Former name: James Madison Junior-Senior High School
- Type: Public
- Established: September 8, 1968; 58 years ago
- School district: Houston Independent School District
- NCES District ID: 482364002530
- Principal: Janet Orozco
- Grades: 9–12
- Enrollment: 1,855 (2023-2024)
- Student to teacher ratio: 14.95
- Colors: Light blue, red and white
- Nickname: Marlins
- Website: madison.houstonisd.org

James Madison High School is a public high school located in the Hiram Clarke area of Houston, Texas, United States. The school, located in the Five Corners District, serves grades 9 through 12 and is part of the Houston Independent School District. The school is named after James Madison, the fourth President of the United States.

Madison contains HISD's magnet program for Space and Meteorological Sciences; the program is known as the High School for Meteorology & Space Science.

== History ==
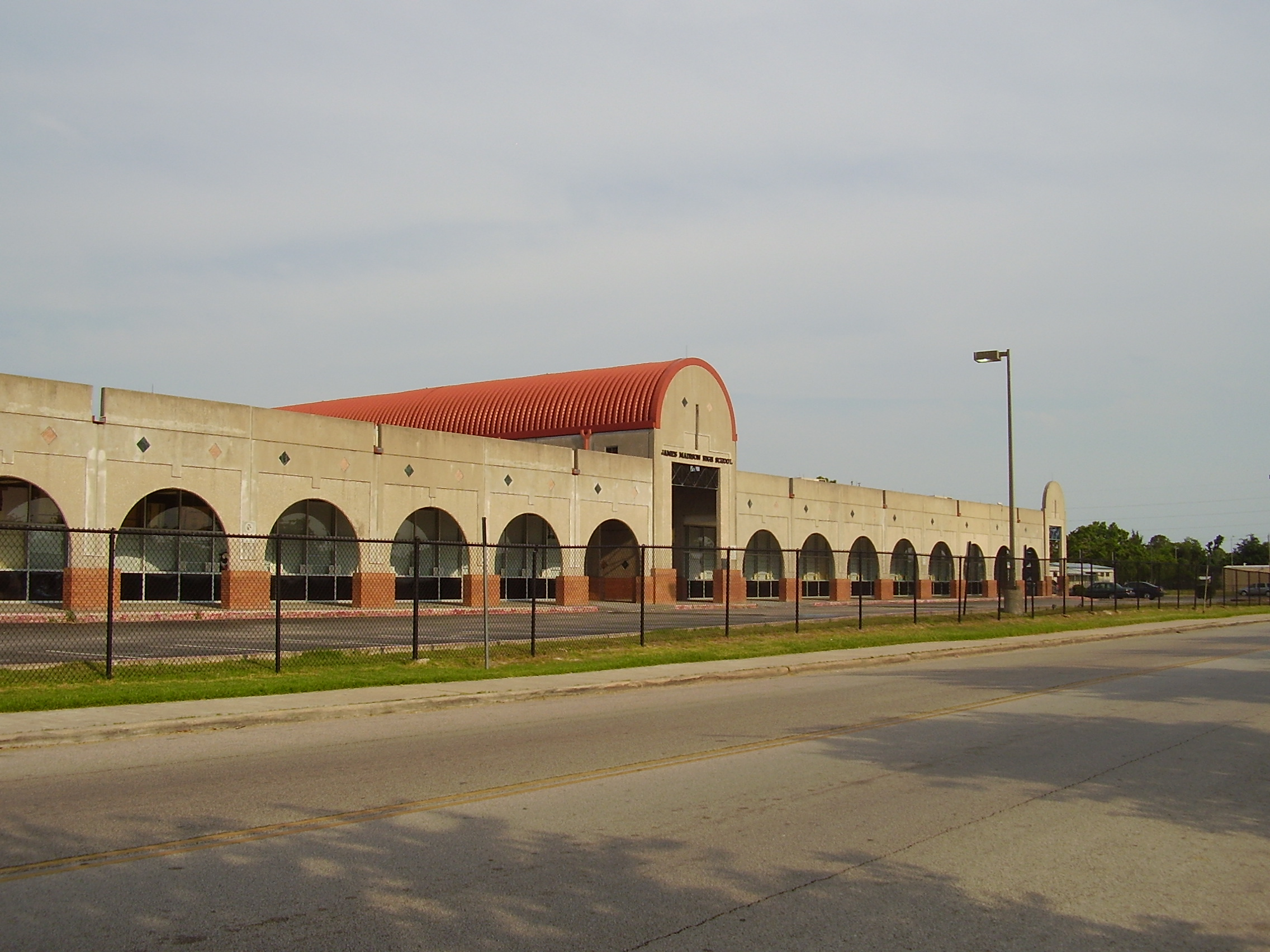
Former Madison High School building

James Madison Junior-Senior High School was opened on September 8, 1965. In February 1968, Dick Dowling Junior High School (now Audrey Lawson Middle School) was opened and James Madison became a high school that temporarily taught 9th graders for that first year. By the next year, it was for grades 10 through 12.

In 1974 Carrie Rochon McAfee became the principal of Madison and worked there for 15 years. She was the first woman to become the principal of a traditional public high school in Texas. The Madison community knows her as "Marlin Mama."

In the northern hemisphere fall of 1981, Madison again covered the ninth grade.

In the 1980s the school was called the "James Madison Academy of International Education."

The magnet program opened in 1995 with a partnership with KPRC-TV (Channel 2).

In 2007, a study by the Associated Press and Johns Hopkins University referred to Madison as a "dropout factory" where at least 40% of the entering freshman class does not make it to their senior year.

In the period 2014-2019 Madison had five principals. In early 2019, Carlotta Outley Brown, previously principal of Peck Elementary School, became the principal; this occurred at the mid-point of the second semester of the 2018–2019 school year.

== Location ==
Madison is in Houston's neighborhood "Hiram Clarke" nearby Hiram Clarke Road and West Orem Street, a major thoroughfare.

== Neighborhoods served by Madison ==
Houston neighborhoods served by Madison include portions of Almeda, Link Valley and the Hiram Clarke area, including Dumbarton Village, Almeda Plaza, Almeda Manor, Brentwood, Keswick Place, Westbrook, Krogerville, Briarwick, Townwood, Cambridge Village, Corinthian Pointe, Glen Iris (including Angel Lane), Meredith Manor, Pamela Heights, Post Oak Village, Summerlyn , San Pablo, Willow Glen, and Windsor Village. In addition portions of unincorporated Harris County are served by Madison. One Houston Housing Authority public housing complex, Peninsula Park, is zoned to Madison High.

In 1970 Westwood, along with some other White communities, was rezoned from Westbury High School to Madison because of a court ruling. By 1990, Madison was 1% White while Westbury was about 50% Black, 25% White, 15% Hispanic, and 10% Asian. In 1992 an attendance boundary shift occurred but Westwood was still in the Madison zone. The Westwood community advocated for a rezoning to Westbury, and after the community gave a presentation to the HISD board, the board unanimously rezoned the community to Westbury.

== Dress code ==
As of 2019 the students are required to wear school uniforms. In 2019 principal Outley Brown instituted a dress code for parents visiting the school. The principal instituted this after objecting to the dress of a parent trying to register her child for school. This dress code bars parents from wearing pajamas, hair rollers, satin caps, shower caps, and other casual items.

== Student body ==
As of the 2016–2017 school year, 1,661 students attended Madison.

By race/ethnicity:

- 58% were Hispanic
- 40% were African American
- 1% were white
- 1% were Asian-Pacific Islanders
- Less than 1% were Native American
- Less than 1% were of 2 or more races/ethnicities

== Feeder patterns ==
The following elementary schools feed into Madison High School:

- Fondren
- Grissom
- Hines-Caldwell
- Hobby
- Montgomery
- Petersen
- Windsor Village

(partial)

- Shearn

All elementary and middle school students of Reagan K-8 are zoned to Madison. Portions of the Dowling Middle School, Pershing Middle School and Welch Middle School boundaries feed into Madison. Any students zoned to Pershing may apply to Pin Oak Middle School's regular program, so Pin Oak also feeds into Madison.

== Notable alumni ==
- Michael Arceneaux - Author of I Can't Date Jesus
- Kirk Baptiste - 1984 Olympics silver medalist.
- Lance Blanks - Former basketball player for the Detroit Pistons. (Did not graduate from Madison)
- Brett Cullen - Actor
- Donald Jordan - former NFL running back
- Garry Kimble - former NFL cornerback
- Greg Kite - Former basketball player for the Boston Celtics, the Los Angeles Clippers, the Sacramento Kings, the Orlando Magic, the New York Knicks and the Indiana Pacers.
- Chuck LaMar First General Manager of the Tampa Bay Devil Rays Baseball Club
- Tommy Mason-Griffin - Professional basketball player.
- Chad Jackson - Former American basketball player and Ozone award-winning Music writer
- Jerel Myers - Former American football player of the Buffalo Bills and Washington Redskins.
- Moran Norris - Fullback for the Houston Texans.
- Richard Seals - former NFL defensive tackle
- Broderick Thomas - Former American football player for the Tampa Bay Buccaneers, the Detroit Lions, the Minnesota Vikings, and the Dallas Cowboys
- Vince Young - Former American football player
