= Brentwood, Houston =

Neighborhood of Houston, Texas

Coordinates: 29.64°N 95.44°W

Brentwood is a residential subdivision in the Hiram Clarke community, in Southwest Houston, Texas. Jennifer Frey of The Washington Post said in 2001 that Brentwood was "a medium-size, lower-middle class neighborhood[...]"

== History ==
Originally Brentwood was a White community, settled in the 1960s. Claudia Kolker of the Houston Press said that the first generation of settlers, who were White, as well as the second and third, who were Black, came for the "small-town quality." By the mid-1970s the community was changing into an African-American neighborhood. Kolker said "the transition by most accounts was fairly gentle -- and if anything, scaled Brentwood even further up economically." Kolker added "Over the years, most of the white residents moved out and Brentwood became a sought-after prize for successful Black Houstonians tired of the city. And in contrast to the stereotype of what happens when a neighborhood changes hue, Brentwood became if anything more pristine, more fiercely nurtured, as its Black residents multiplied." During the transition period there was a conflict between area White people and area Black people who wanted to assume control of a local church. The church later evolved into a multimillion-dollar organization.

As the community matured, some portions decayed. Rod Paige, a man who would later become the superintendent of the Houston Independent School District and the Secretary of Education, spearheaded a move to excise a dump from the edge of the community. The Texas Supreme Court eventually sided with the residents. In the 1990s the Brentwood Baptist Church, a local church, suggested housing AIDS victims on the property. This led to controversy and paranoia within the neighborhood. Some residents felt that the church had betrayed their community, and moved to keep their families away from the AIDS victims.

As of 1996, the subdivision has a lot of stability in its pool of residents since relatively few people moved in and out of the community. This differed from nearby areas which have many rental units, such as Glen Iris, Meredith Manor, and Pamela Heights. Stanley O'Bryant, a realty agent of B E Henson & Associates and a letter carrier, said that Brentwood was "a very stable neighborhood. Hardly anybody moves." By 1996 the Hiram Clarke Civic Club had prevented the establishment of a correctional facility and an animal shelter on Brentwood's periphery.

In late August 1997, after legal wrangling, the AIDS housing opened. By 1999, the controversy over the church's AIDS victim housing cooled when the community's perception of the disease as a disease for White people waned and the community recognized AIDS as a problem affecting the African American community.

By 2002 Brentwood residents lobbied against the installation of an affordable housing project.

== Cityscape ==
Brentwood is near West Airport Boulevard and Hiram Clarke Road. Brentwood is 6 miles (9.7 km) from the intersection of the 610 Loop and U.S. Route 59 (Southwest Freeway). Most houses in Brentwood have one story each, and are made of brick.

In 1995 Claudia Kolker of the Houston Press described Brentwood as "pristine" and "orderly" which contains "decorously maintained homes." Kolker said "It's the very intimacy between these places that impresses a visitor: the way the ranch-style houses nudge against the grade school grounds, and how the playground stretches toward the parking lot that fronts the church. Almost a physical definition of the word community, this piece of Brentwood seems an icon of a time when home, education and religion all clasped together into one, universally accepted whole." In regards to the surrounding area, Kolker said "a skein of high tension wires laces a long pasture nibbled by cows. Buildings are few, and sound seems somehow muffled out here along Hiram Clarke Road, the thoroughfare that borders these fields. Here in the southwest suburbs, even the grimy Eagle Food Mart, stocked with requisite ATM machines, gas pumps and parking lot loiterers, retains the air of a small country store." Kolker said "Today, to pass the redwood "Brentwood" sign on Airport Street beside Eagle Food Mart is to enter a lapidary haven of gemlike lawns, immaculate houses and burnished cars" and that the local elementary school is "a brief walk from streets with storybook names such as Wuthering Heights, White Heather and Regency." She concluded "While Brentwood's population has changed over the past three decades, its charms have remained much the same."

In 1996 few of the houses had burglar bars. Houses had few "for sale" signs and lawns were manicured. Many lawns had "poodle bushes." Around that time houses were listed for sale in the range $42,000 ($86218.97 in today's money) to $74,900 ($153757.16 in today's money). The houses were more inexpensive than similar houses in Fondren Southwest and sections of Missouri City.

As of 2007 most houses had burglar bars, and many have placed cameras at the corners of their houses. One woman installed motion sensors, rigged her doors and windows, and booby trapped her backyard gate.

== Government and infrastructure ==
The Hiram Clarke Civic Club is an area civic club that covers the community. Covers Brentwood and one other subdivisions, with almost 1,200 households living in the two subdivisions combined. As of 2003 it had 175 members who paid dues. Matt Schwartz of the Houston Chronicle said "Even with dues of $50 a year, enforcing restrictions with letters from attorneys or lawsuits can quickly drain resources."

== Culture ==
Brentwood Baptist Church is located in Brentwood. It originally had a small congregation; as of 1996 its membership had over 10,000 people. Katherine Feser of the Houston Chronicle said in 1996 that the church "anchored" Brentwood. In 1995 Claudia Kolker of the Houston Press said that Brentwood Baptist Church did not function as a community church, and that many residents went to church in the original "wards" where they had been raised.

== Education ==
Residents are zoned to the Houston Independent School District. Hobby Elementary School is located inside the neighborhood. Residents are zoned to Hobby, Lawson Middle School (formerly Dowling Middle School), and Madison High School.

Effective 2026, Hobby Elementary will move onto the property of Lawson Middle while remaining a separate institution.

Residents are also zoned to the Houston Community College system.

== Parks and recreation ==
Residents are served by Brentwood Park, a City of Houston park.

== Notable residents ==
- Rod Paige (would later become the superintendent of the Houston Independent School District and the United States Secretary of Education) - He served as the president of the Hiram Clarke Civic Club.
  - Paige lived in a one-story brick and wood house with a driveway and a garage. Its front windows have tinted glass. Paige bought the house after he moved to Houston in the early 1970s. As of 2001 Paige still resides in this house; he said that he has no interest in living elsewhere. Jennifer Frey of The Washington Post described Paige's house as "modest".
