= Vince Young =

American football player (born 1983)

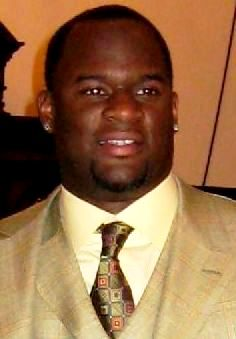
- Young in 2007

No. 10, 9
- Position: Quarterback

Personal information
- Born: May 18, 1983 (age 43); Houston, Texas, U.S.
- Listed height: 6 ft 5 in (1.96 m)
- Listed weight: 232 lb (105 kg)

Career information
- High school: Madison (Houston)
- College: Texas (2002–2005)
- NFL draft: 2006: 1st round, 3rd overall pick

Career history

Playing
- Tennessee Titans (2006–2010); Philadelphia Eagles (2011); Buffalo Bills (2012)*; Green Bay Packers (2013)*; Cleveland Browns (2014)*; Saskatchewan Roughriders (2017)*
- * Offseason or practice squad member only

Coaching
- Texas (2021–present) Special assistant

Awards and highlights
- NFL Offensive Rookie of the Year (2006); 2× Pro Bowl (2006, 2009); PFWA All-Rookie Team (2006); BCS national champion (2005); Maxwell Award (2005); Davey O'Brien Award (2005); Manning Award (2005); Consensus All-American (2005); Big 12 Offensive Player of the Year (2005); Big 12 Offensive Freshman of the Year (2003); First-team All-Big 12 (2005); Second-team AP All-Time All-American (2005); Texas Longhorns No. 10 retired

Career NFL statistics
- Passing attempts: 1,304
- Passing completions: 755
- Completion percentage: 57.9%
- TD–INT: 46–51
- Passing yards: 8,964
- Passer rating: 74.4
- Rushing yards: 1,459
- Rushing touchdowns: 12
- Stats at Pro Football Reference
- College Football Hall of Fame

Vincent Paul Young Jr. (born May 18, 1983) is an American former professional football quarterback who played in the National Football League (NFL) for six seasons, primarily with the Tennessee Titans. He played college football for the Texas Longhorns, winning the Maxwell, Davey O'Brien, and Manning awards in 2005 en route to a victory in the 2006 Rose Bowl. Young was selected by the Titans third overall in the 2006 NFL draft.

In his first season, Young won NFL Offensive Rookie of the Year and was named to the Pro Bowl. Young helped the team reach the playoffs the following year and received a second Pro Bowl selection in 2009. Due to conflict with Titans management, he was released in 2010. Young spent his last season as a backup for the Philadelphia Eagles. He was inducted to the College Football Hall of Fame in 2019.

== Early life ==
Young grew up in the 4th Ward and Hiram Clarke neighborhoods of Houston, Texas, where he was primarily raised by his mother and his grandmother. His father, Vincent Young Sr., missed much of Vince's college career due to a 2003 burglary conviction and prison sentence. Young credits his mother and grandmother for keeping him away from the street gangs. At the age of seven, Young was struck by a vehicle while riding his bicycle at the corner of Tidewater and Buxley, streets in his Houston neighborhood. The accident nearly killed him, leaving him hospitalized for months after the bicycle's handle bar went into his stomach. Today, he credits this event for making him into a "tougher" individual. Young wore the #10 to show love and respect for his mother, Felicia Young, whose birthday is June 10. Young attended Dick Dowling Middle School in Hiram Clarke. Some of Young's friends were a part of the "Hiram Clarke Boys", a local street gang; many of those friends died as a result of their activities. Young's mother confronted him after he had been involved in a fight between gangs, and told him that he needed to change his behavior.

=== High school career ===
You can't turn on a television in Houston without seeing Vince Young. You might see him more than the Texans. He was like LeBron James in Houston when he was coming out of high school.

— Rodrique Wright, Alief Hastings High School, and later Texas defensive tackle.

Young was coached by Ray Seals at Madison High School in Houston, where he started at quarterback for three years and compiled 12,987 yards of total offense during his high school career. During his senior season, he led his Madison Marlins to a 61–58 victory in the 5A Regionals over the previously undefeated Galena Park North Shore Mustangs, accounting for more than 400 yards of total offense, while passing for three touchdowns and rushing for two more before a crowd of 45,000 in the Houston Astrodome. After beating Missouri City Hightower 56–22 in the state quarterfinals, Houston Madison faced Austin Westlake in the state semifinals. Although Young completed 18 of 30 passes for 400 yards and five touchdowns and rushed for 92 yards (on 18 carries) and a touchdown, Houston Madison lost by a score of 48–42.

Among the honors Young received in high school were:

- being named Parade's and Student Sports' National Player of the Year after compiling 3,819 yards and 59 touchdowns as a senior,
- being named 2001 Texas 5A Offensive Player of the Year,
- designation as The Sporting News's top high-school prospect,
- and the Pete Dawkins Trophy in the U.S. Army All-American Bowl.

Young was also a varsity athlete in numerous other sports. In basketball, he played as a guard/forward and averaged more than 25 points per game over his career. This allowed him to be a four-year letterman and two-time all-district performer. In track and field, he was a three-year letterman and member of two district-champion 400-meter relay squads. In baseball, he played for two seasons, spending time as both an outfielder and pitcher. He also made the all-state team in football and in track.

== College career ==
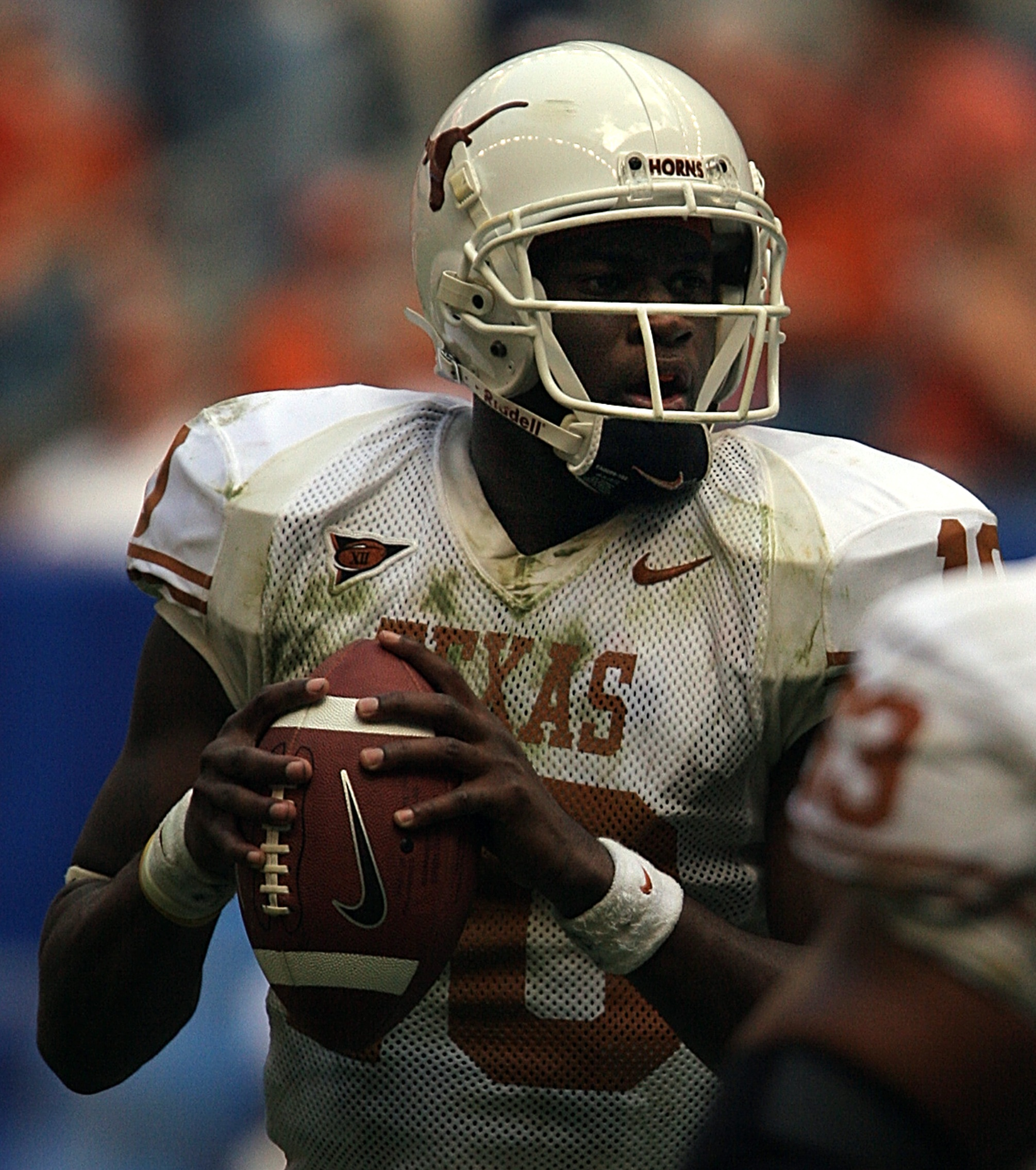
Young during the 2005 Big XII Championship game

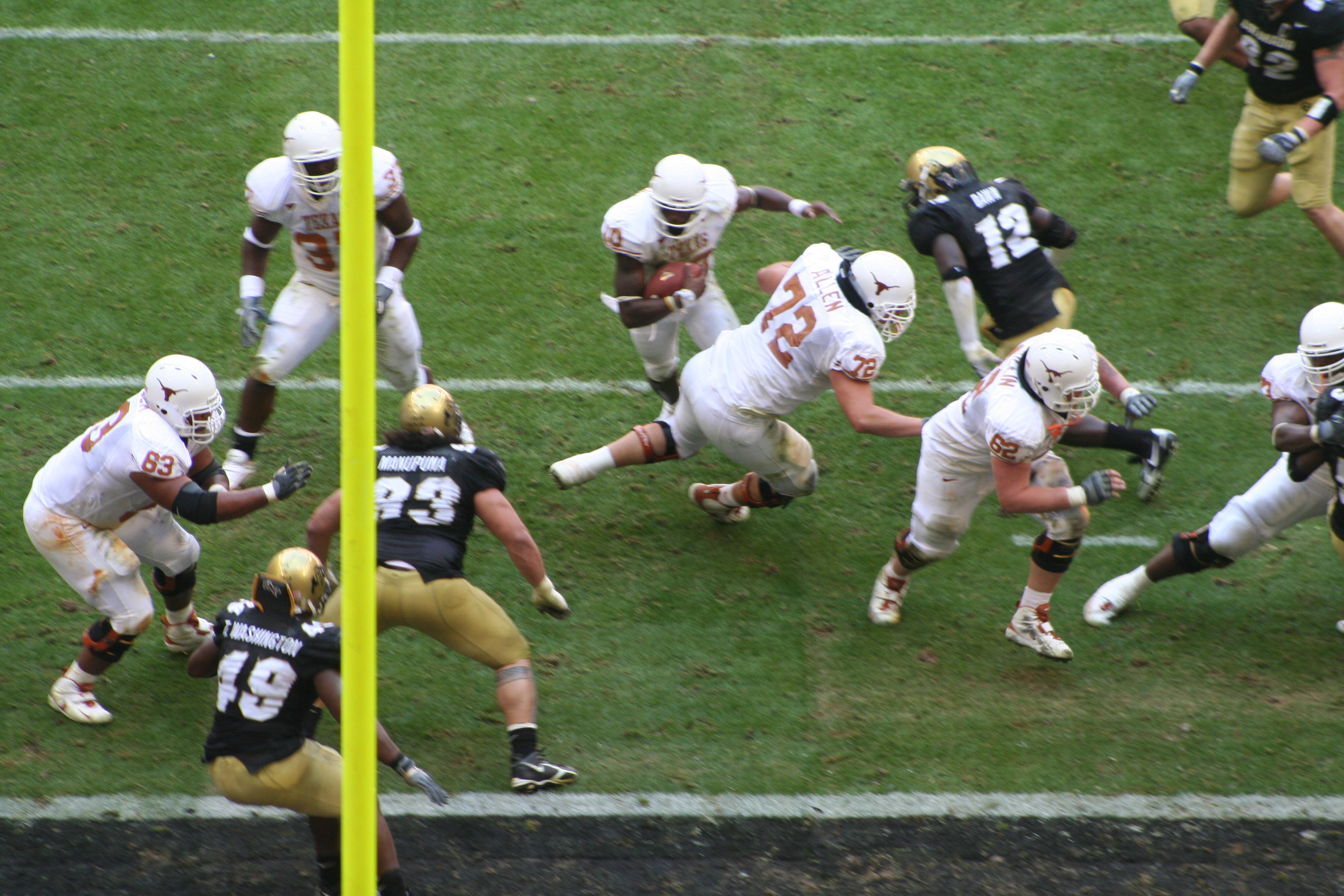
Young scores a touchdown in the 2005 Big 12 Championship Game.

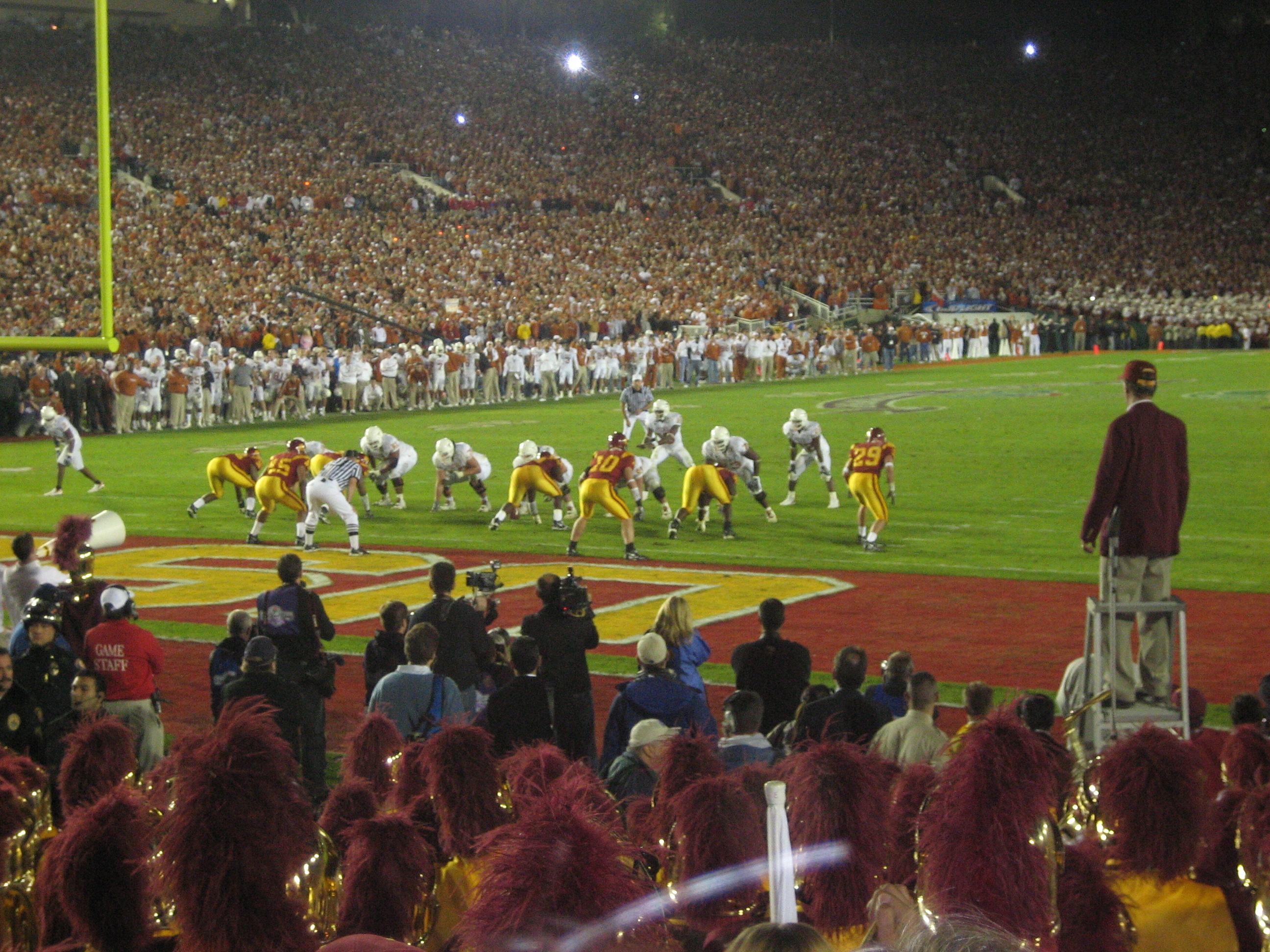
Young about to score the go-ahead touchdown in the 2006 Rose Bowl

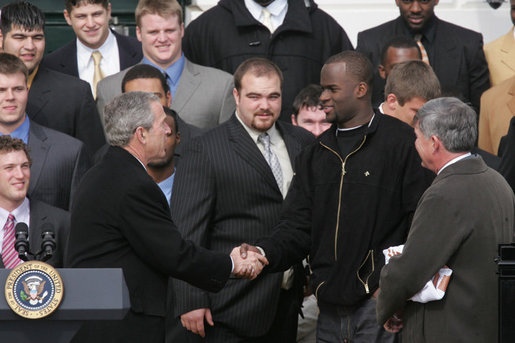
Young at the White House with George W. Bush, Mack Brown, and members of the 2005 national championship team

Young enrolled at the University of Texas, where he played for coach Mack Brown's Texas Longhorns football team from 2002 to 2005. He was part of an exceptionally strong Texas recruiting class that included future NFL players Rodrique Wright, Justin Blalock, Brian Robison, Kasey Studdard, Lyle Sendlein, David Thomas, Selvin Young, and Aaron Ross. Young redshirted his freshman year.

=== 2003 season ===
As a redshirt freshman during the 2003 season, Young was initially second on the depth chart behind Chance Mock. However, Mock was benched halfway through the season (in the game against Oklahoma) in favor of Young. After that game, Young and Mock alternated playing time. Young appeared in 12 games and passed for 1,155 yards, six passing touchdowns, and seven interceptions to go along with 135 carries for 998 rushing yards and 11 rushing touchdowns.

=== 2004 season ===
As a redshirt sophomore in the 2004 season, Young started every game and led the Longhorns to an 11–1 season record (losing to rival Oklahoma in a shutout), a top-five final ranking, and the school's first-ever appearance in the Rose Bowl, in which they defeated the University of Michigan. He began to earn his reputation as a dual-threat quarterback by passing for 1,849 yards and rushing for 1,189 yards. The Texas coaches helped facilitate this performance by changing the team offensive scheme from the more traditional I-formation to a shotgun formation with three wide receivers. This change gave the offense more options in terms of play selection, and consequently made defending against it more difficult.

Before his junior season, Young appeared on the cover of Dave Campbell's Texas Football alongside Texas A&M quarterback Reggie McNeal.

=== 2005 season: National Championship ===
As a redshirt junior in the 2005 season, Young led the Longhorns to an 11–0 regular-season record. The Longhorns held a number-two ranking in the preseason, and held that ranking through the season except for one week when they were ranked number one in the Bowl Championship Series. Texas won the Big 12 championship game 70–3 over Colorado and still held their number-two BCS ranking, which earned them a berth in the National Championship Rose Bowl game against the USC Trojans. Before the game, the USC Trojans were being discussed on ESPN and other media outlets as possibly the greatest college football team of all time. Riding a 34-game winning streak, including the previous National Championship, USC featured two Heisman Trophy winners in the backfield – quarterback Matt Leinart (2004 Heisman winner) and running back Reggie Bush (2005 Heisman winner)

In the 2006 Rose Bowl, Young accounted for 467 yards of total offense (200 rushing, 267 passing) and three rushing touchdowns (including a 9-yard touchdown scramble on fourth down with 19 seconds left) to lead the Longhorns to a 41–38 victory. This performance led to him winning Rose Bowl Most Valuable Player honors. Young finished the season with 3,036 yards passing and 1,050 yards rushing earning him the Davey O'Brien Award. He was also named the Longhorns MVP. He was named an All-American. In recognition of his Rose Bowl accomplishments, Young was inducted into the Rose Bowl Hall of Fame in 2018.

Early in his college career, Young had been criticized as "great rusher...average passer", and his unconventional throwing motion had been criticized as being "side-arm" as opposed to the conventional "over-the-top" throwing motion typically used by quarterbacks.

Young reached a win–loss record as a starter of 30–2, ranking him number one of all University of Texas quarterbacks by number of wins, although his successor, Colt McCoy, far surpassed him with 45. His .938 winning percentage as a starting quarterback ranks sixth-best in Division I history. During his career at Texas (2003–05), Young passed for 6,040 yards and 44 touchdowns while rushing for 3,127 yards (first on Texas's all-time QB rushing list and number seven on Texas's all-time list) and 37 touchdowns (number five on Texas's all-time rushing touchdowns list and tied for first among quarterbacks). He was also number 10 on ESPN/IBM's list of the greatest college football players ever. In 2007, ESPN compiled a list of the top-100 plays in college football history; Young's game-winning touchdown in the 2006 Rose Bowl ranked fifth.

The University of Texas retired Young's number 10 jersey during the 2008 season-opening football game on August 30, 2008.

== Professional career ==
=== Pre-draft ===
Throughout the 2005 season Young had indicated that he planned to return to the University of Texas for his senior year in 2006. The day after Texas won the BCS National Championship, Young accepted an invitation to appear on The Tonight Show with Jay Leno. When Leno asked Young whether he would stay for his senior year of college or declare for the 2006 NFL Draft, Young replied that he would discuss the matter with his pastor, his family, and coach Mack Brown. On January 8, 2006, Young announced he would enter the NFL draft, where he was expected to be drafted early in the first round. Even after his Rose Bowl performance, some observers said he may have difficulty in the NFL because of his unorthodox sidearm throwing motion and the different style of play in the NFL.

The Saints, who held the second overall pick, were likely to pass on drafting a high-rated quarterback after Drew Brees signed with the team as a free agent. Though Titans quarterback Steve McNair was a personal friend of Young's and favored him as his "heir apparent", Tennessee's coaches reportedly favored drafting Matt Leinart, and Young was no longer thought to be a consensus top five pick. Some had speculated that he would not even be picked in the top ten.

News regarding the Wonderlic, a standardized test given to all recruits, was problematic for Young. On February 25, 2006, during the NFL Combine, it was reported that Vince scored a 6 out of a possible 50 points on his Wonderlic Test. The test is designed to measure a player's ability to learn a complex NFL playbook. Some observers believed this score would lower Young's draft selection and faulted his agent, Major Adams, for not preparing Young ahead of time with practice tests.

However, on February 26, 2006, combine officials said the reported score of 6 was incorrect. According to NFL Spokesman Steve Alic, "I can tell you absolutely that the score that has been reported on the Internet is inaccurate. I spoke to the person who graded the test, and he assured me that that number was not correct." The next day, the test was re-administered and Young allegedly scored a 16.

Pre-draft measurables
Height	Weight	Arm length	Hand span	40-yard dash	Wonderlic
6 ft 4 5/8 in (1.95 m)	228 lb (103 kg)	33 1/4 in (0.84 m)	9 1/8 in (0.23 m)	4.58 s	6, 16
Wonderlic was taken at NFL Scouting Combine; others are from Texas Pro Day.

=== Tennessee Titans ===
==== 2006 season: Rookie season ====
The NFL Draft was held on April 29–30, 2006. The Tennessee Titans drafted Young in the first round as the 3rd overall pick, confirming the predictions of many draft experts. He was the first quarterback taken in the draft, with the Titans choosing him instead of Matt Leinart. The Titans general manager, Floyd Reese, said Young's upside was the deciding factor in his being chosen. Reese said, "Last night at 11:35, I was on my knees praying ... he will rewrite the position. This guy physically is such a combination of arms and legs. People want to make him out to be a Michael Vick. He's not that. He's different."

On July 27, 2006, Young agreed to terms on his initial contract with the Titans. Terms of the deal were reported to include five years with a sixth year team option and as much as US$58 million overall including $25.7 million in guaranteed money. As a quarterback, Young was able to reach a deal similar to that signed by the draft's #1 overall pick, Texans defensive end Mario Williams.

On September 17, Young threw for his first career touchdown against the San Diego Chargers in a 40–7 loss. Young made his first career start versus the Dallas Cowboys on October 1, 2006, completing 14 of 29 passes for 155 yards, one touchdown, and two interceptions. He achieved his first NFL victory (against the Washington Redskins, 25–22) on October 15, 2006.

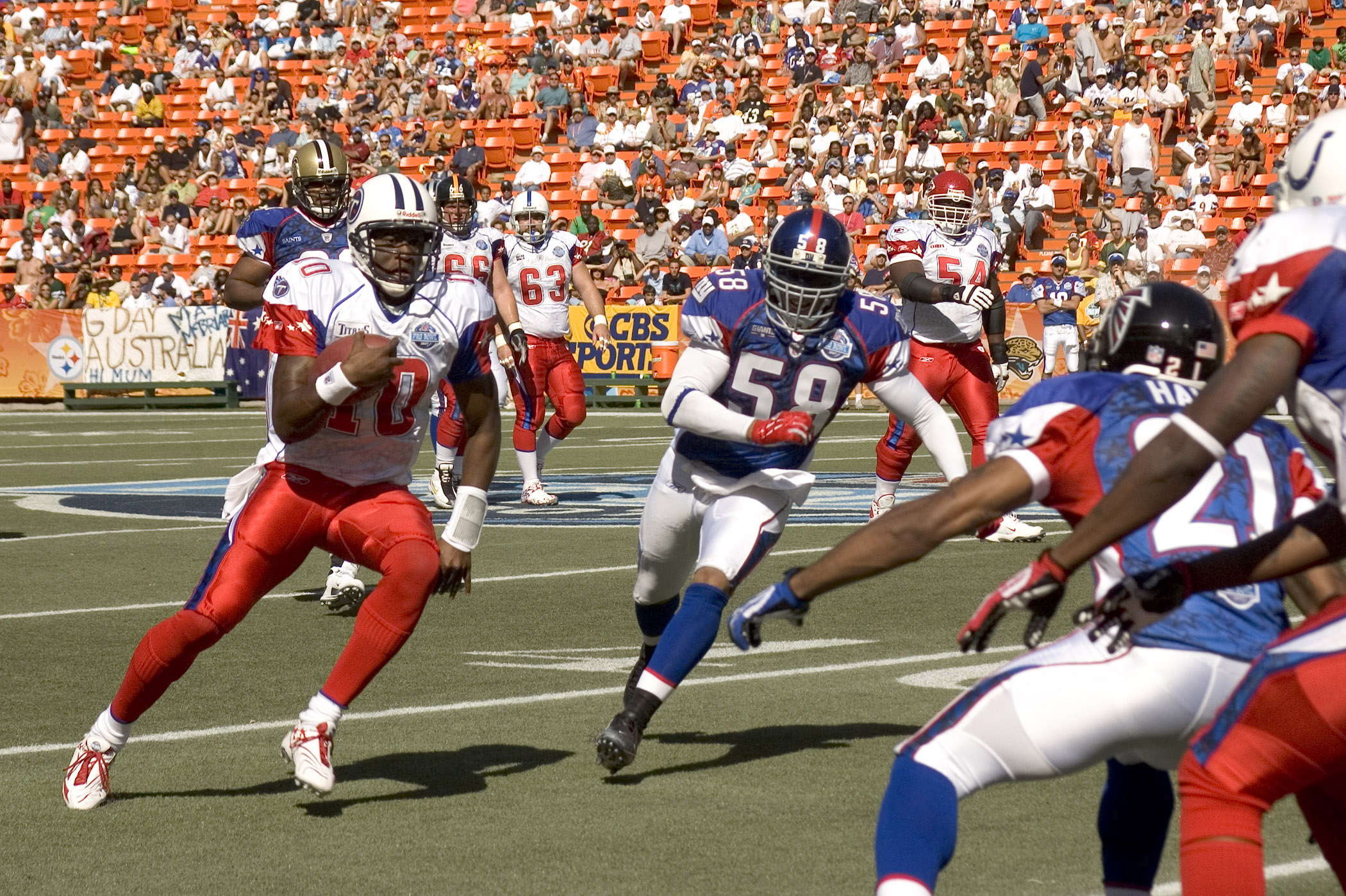
Young during the 2007 Pro Bowl, wearing red/white #10

On November 26, 2006, Young led his first NFL fourth-quarter comeback, against the New York Giants. With the Giants leading 21–0, the tide suddenly changed after New York quarterback Eli Manning threw an interception to Pacman Jones. Young subsequently led a scoring drive, throwing a touchdown pass to ex-Longhorn teammate Bo Scaife. After the Titans forced a three-and-out, Young ran an option play for a touchdown on the next drive. Another successful stop led to Young throwing his second touchdown of the quarter. After another Eli Manning interception to Pacman Jones, this time with only 30 seconds left in the game, Young calmly led his team down the field for Rob Bironas' game-winning field goal to clinch a 24–21 victory over the Giants. It was statistically the best performance of Vince Young's NFL career: he went 24/35 for 249 yards and two touchdowns, with a 107.9 passer rating. He also rushed 10 times for 69 yards and a touchdown.

A week later, Young led another come-from-behind victory over the Indianapolis Colts who were 10–1, with Rob Bironas icing the game with a 60-yard field goal. The 14-point comeback marked the first time in NFL history that a rookie quarterback led two 14+ point comebacks in the same season.

The following week marked Young's first pro game in his hometown of Houston vs the Texans, who had notably chosen Williams over Young months prior. He led the Titans back from a 4th quarter deficit for the 3rd consecutive week, with the game eventually going into OT. On 3rd and 14, Young burst up the middle for a 39-yard game winning TD run.

On December 24, 2006, Young led yet another come-from-behind victory over the Buffalo Bills who, along with the Titans, had a 7–7 record and were competing for an AFC wild card playoff spot. This time the comeback was from nine points down after Rian Lindell kicked a 24-yard field goal at the end of the 3rd quarter to make the score 29–20 in favor of the Bills. Young then led the Titans on a 9-play, 62-yard drive that spanned 4:16 and ended with a 29-yard touchdown pass to Brandon Jones to make the score 27–29. After a three and out by the Bills, Young again led his team on a 7:15, 14-play scoring drive that culminated in a 30-yard field goal by Rob Bironas, putting the Titans on top in a 30–29 victory. Young ended the day going 13-of-20 for 183 yards, two touchdowns, and no interceptions, with a rating of 127.7. He also rushed eight times for 61 yards and one touchdown.

Young set the NFL record for rushing yards by a rookie quarterback with 552, breaking the old record of 509 yards set by Billy Kilmer in 1961. Cam Newton broke the record in 2011, and Jayden Daniels set the current record in 2024 with 891, although Young's 552 rushing yards still ranks 6th among rookie quarterbacks. He won the Associated Press NFL Offensive Rookie of The Year honors at the conclusion of the 2006 NFL campaign, becoming only the third quarterback to win the award, along with Dennis Shaw and Ben Roethlisberger.

On February 3, Young was named to the 2007 Pro Bowl to replace Philip Rivers whose foot injury kept him out of what would have been his first Pro Bowl appearance. Young threw one interception in limited play time in the Pro Bowl.

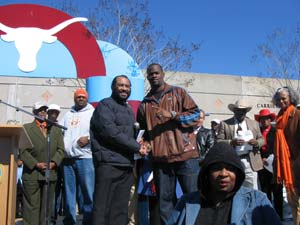
Young along with Congressman Al Green at the Vince Young Parade in Houston on February 11, 2006

Of the rookie quarterback class of 2006, Young had the best record as a starter, surpassing the only other three starting rookie quarterbacks: Matt Leinart, Jay Cutler, and Bruce Gradkowski. During the 2006 season, Young led the Tennessee Titans to eight wins, including six straight wins. He had a record of 8–5 as a starter. Of the wins, four of them were fourth quarter comebacks, including three straight fourth quarter comebacks. His passer rating was 66.7, which ranked 30th of 31 qualified quarterbacks in the NFL that season. Only Tampa Bay quarterback Bruce Gradkowski had a lower rating of 65.9.

Young has also appeared on the cover of Sports Illustrated six times: once in the 2005 College Football season preview issue, on a December issue prior to the Big 12 Championship game versus Colorado, on the weekly edition after the 2006 Rose Bowl and also the Commemorative edition following the 2006 Rose Bowl, once for the 2006 NFL draft preview issue, and most recently after the Titans won four straight games in the 2006 NFL season. Young's performance in his rookie season earned him the honor of being the cover athlete for the video game Madden NFL 08.

Young was awarded the NFL Rookie of the Year honors for 2006. In spite of this, Young considered ending his career. In an article published by NFL.com Young was quoted as saying he thought about retiring from professional football after his first season stating "I really thought long and hard about it. There was so much going on with my family. It was crazy being an NFL quarterback. It wasn't fun anymore. All of the fun was out of it. All of the excitement was gone. All I was doing was worrying about things." However, Young would later recant this stating he never considered quitting football and his remarks were blown out of proportion.

==== 2007 season ====
For the first exhibition game against the Washington Redskins on August 11, 2007, Titans head coach Jeff Fisher benched Young after he broke one of the team rules. Though Fisher declined to mention the rule Young broke, Young later hesitantly admitted that he left the team hotel the previous night in order to sleep at his home without informing Fisher. Young apologized for his behavior and was allowed to play for the next game.

During the Titans first game, a 13–10 win against the Jacksonville Jaguars, Young threw for 78 yards with 1 interception and ran for 22 yards, including a touchdown. In Week 2, the Titans lost 22–20 to the Indianapolis Colts at home. Vince threw for 164 yards and a touchdown and ran for 53 yards on 5 carries. During Week 3, the Titans played the New Orleans Saints in the first of their 2 appearances on Monday Night Football in the 2007 season. The Titans beat the Saints 31–14 behind Young's 185 total yards (21 rushing, 164 passing) and 2 touchdowns with 1 interception. On Sunday October 7, Vince Young and the Titans took to the field in Nashville as they took on the Atlanta Falcons. Despite a lackluster day, the Titans and Young would come away with the victory 20–13. Young was 20–33 with 153 yards and 3 interceptions.

Young injured his quadriceps during the first half of a matchup against Tampa Bay Buccaneers in Week 6. Young went to the dressing room clutching his leg, but returned after half-time and was shown warming up on the sidelines. However, he would not return to the game as a precautionary measure. The Titans would go on to lose the game 13–10.

Despite an upcoming divisional matchup against the Houston Texans Young missed the following week's matchup after being listed as a gametime decision. This would be Young's first start missed due to injury. He returned the next week against the Oakland Raiders to complete 6 of 14 attempts for 42 yards in a 13–9 win. The following week against Carolina, Young would complete 14 of 23 attempts for 110 yards and 2 interceptions and add 25 rushing yards and a rushing touchdown in a 20–7 win.

In Week 10 Young completed 24 of 41 passes for 257 yards, 1 touchdown, and 2 interceptions in 28–13 loss against the Jacksonville Jaguars. Young's 257 yards passing in the game would become a new career high passing his previous best of 249 yards in a 24–21 comeback win over the New York Giants in Week 12 of the 2006–2007 season. His 41 attempts would also be a new career high.

The following week Young eclipsed his previous mark for passing yards in a game by throwing for 305 yards with 1 touchdown and 2 interceptions as well as rushing for 74 yards and 1 touchdown in a 34–20 loss against the Denver Broncos on Monday Night Football. His 379 combined yards would set a new career mark passing his previous best of 318 total yards in a 24–21 comeback win over the New York Giants in Week 12 of the 2006–2007 season. He would also equal his career high in attempts with 41.

In Week 13, Young had his best overall passing game of the season against the Houston Texans. Young ended the day by going 21 of 31 for 248 yards with 2 touchdowns and 1 interception for a 99.9 QB Rating in a 28–20 win. Young also added 5 carries for 44 yards which brought his streak of 250+ combined yardage games to 4 straight.

In Week 15, Young posted his best QB Rating of the season by going 16 of 26 for 191 yards with 2 touchdown and 0 interceptions for a QB Rating of 109.6. He would also add 7 carries for 32 yards as the Titans overcame a 14–10 halftime lead by the Kansas City Chiefs to win the game 26–17 and keep their playoff hopes alive moving to 8–6 for the season.

In Week 16, Young completed 12 of 22 passes for 166 yards and 1 interception and added 1 rushing yard in a 10–6 win against the New York Jets. The win against the Jets combined with a loss by the Cleveland Browns earlier in the day put the Titans in position for the last play off spot in the AFC.

In Week 17, Vince Young and the Titans' playoff wishes came to life as they defeated the Indianapolis Colts 16–10 to clinch the 6th seed in the AFC Playoffs. Young would leave the game in the 3rd quarter after suffering what seemed to be a re-injury of his right quad which kept him out for a game earlier in the season. Backup quarterback Kerry Collins would enter in the game and lead the Titans to 2 field goals to break a 10–10 tie and seal the victory. Before the injury, Young posted some of his best numbers of the year by completing 14 of 18 passes for 157 yards with 0 touchdowns, 0 interceptions, and posting a 103.0 QB Rating.

At the end of the regular season, Young finished with 2,459 passing yards with 9 touchdowns and 17 interceptions. Additionally, Young would finish with 395 rushing yards and 3 rushing touchdowns.

In Young's first playoff game, he completed 16 of 29 passes for 138 yards and one interception and had 12 rushing yards for a 53.5 passer rating in a 17–6 loss to the Chargers.

==== 2008 season ====
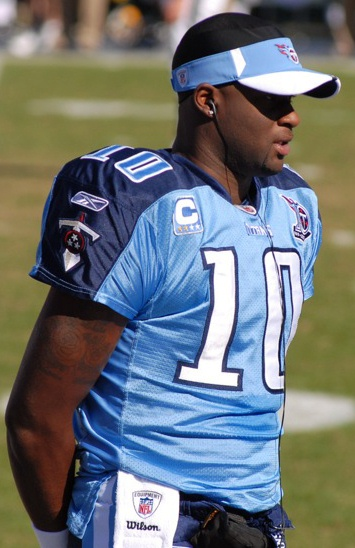
Young with the Tennessee Titans in 2008

In the first game against the Jacksonville Jaguars, Young injured his knee and was expected to miss 2 to 3 weeks. On September 15, Jeff Fisher made the decision to go with Kerry Collins and for Collins to remain the starter for the rest of the season. The Titans finished 13–3 in the regular season, with Young assuming backup duties.

==== 2009 season ====
During the 2009 offseason, head coach Jeff Fisher announced that Kerry Collins would remain the Titans' starting quarterback for the 2009 season; Fisher said that if Young wanted to become the starting quarterback, he would have to "earn his job back".

On October 29, 2009, following a disappointing 0–6 start to the season, Fisher announced that Young would replace Collins as starter. Titans owner Bud Adams had reportedly urged Fisher to give Young more playing time following the team's 59–0 loss to the New England Patriots on October 18, and became even more insistent during the team's bye week that followed. Fisher nonetheless withheld announcing the change "for competitive reasons" until the Thursday afternoon before the Titans' next game, on Sunday, November 1, against the Jacksonville Jaguars. Upon announcing the change, Fisher further stated: "I'm still in Kerry Collins' corner because I don't believe that our record is a reflection of the quarterback play", Fisher said. "It's a reflection of the team play. I'm still in his corner, but we've decided to go ahead and make this change."

Young won eight of his ten starts in the 2009 campaign. The 2009 Titans are the first team in NFL history to win five straight after losing their first six games. On November 29, 2009, Young led the Titans on a 2:37 long, 99-yard drive near the end of their game against the Arizona Cardinals. Young sealed the deal, with a 10-yard game-winning touchdown pass to Kenny Britt on 4th down as time expired. The Titans won 20–17. Young finished with a 99.7 quarterback rating, went 27 for 43, with a career-high 387 yards, one touchdown, and had four carries for eight yards. Incidentally, due to an injury to Cardinals' starting quarterback Kurt Warner, this would mark a rematch of the 2006 Rose Bowl between Young and Cardinals' back-up quarterback Matt Leinart.

Young finished third in the bidding for the NFL Comeback Player of the Year award behind Tampa Bay Buccaneers running back Carnell Williams and the winner, New England Patriots quarterback Tom Brady. Shortly thereafter, Young was announced as the Sporting News comeback player of the year.

Young played in the 2010 Pro Bowl, taking the roster spot of the injured Philip Rivers after Ben Roethlisberger and Carson Palmer declined to replace Rivers due to their own respective injuries.

==== 2010 season ====
Young led the Titans to a 4–5 record in nine of their first ten games in 2010 while throwing for ten touchdowns with a 98.6 passer rating.

During a Week 11 loss to the Washington Redskins, Young suffered a torn flexor tendon in his right thumb, and was held out of the game after he prepared to reenter. Following the game, Young threw his shoulder pads into the crowd as he left the field, had an altercation with Fisher in the locker room, and stormed out. Fisher then declared that Rusty Smith would become the Titans' starting quarterback.

On January 5, 2011, Titans owner Bud Adams issued a press release stating that Young would no longer be on the team's roster for the 2011 season. Young would finish his Titans career with a 30–17 record (63.8%) over five years. As a Titan, Young finished with a 75.4 quarterback rating, with 42 touchdown passes and 42 interceptions.

On July 28, 2011, Young was released by the Titans.

=== Philadelphia Eagles ===
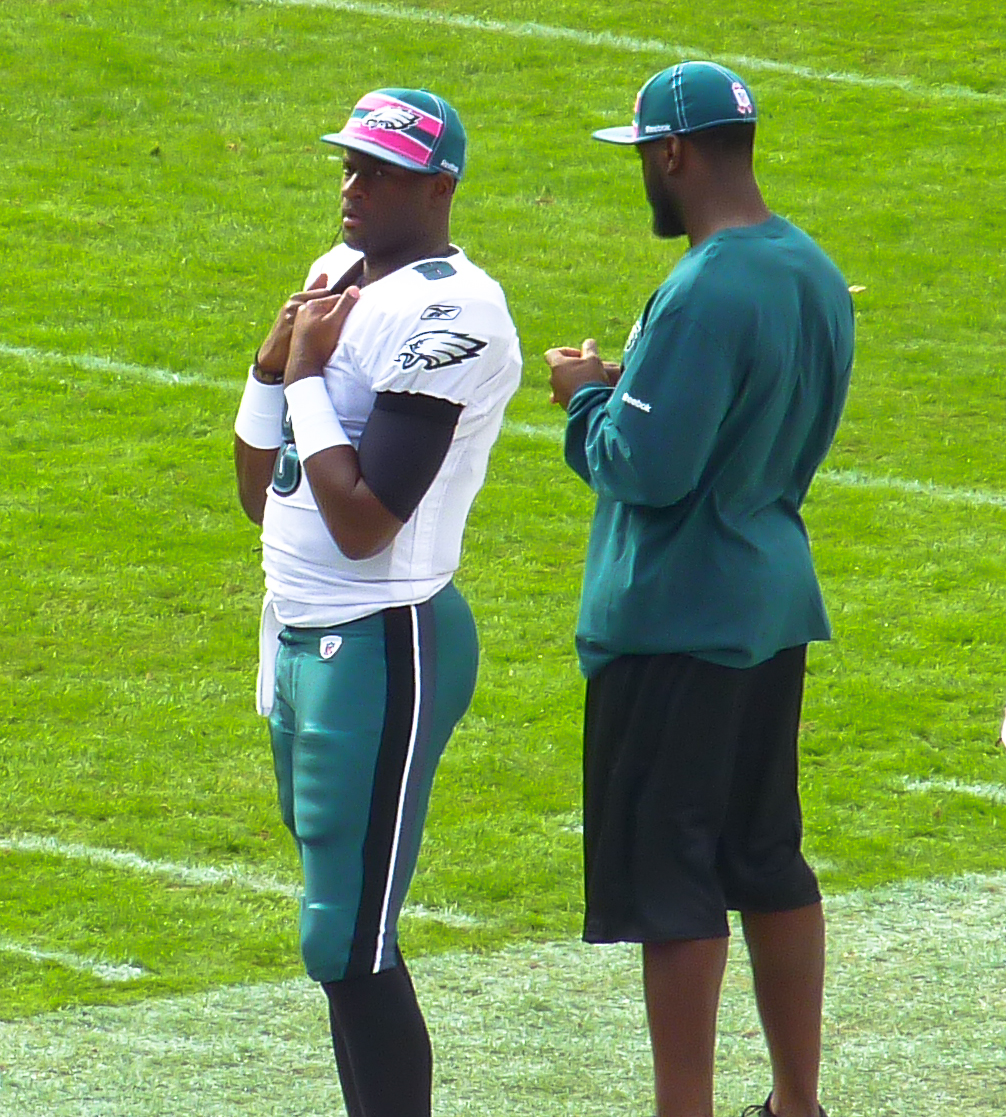
Young on the sidelines during an Eagles game in 2011.

Young was signed by the Philadelphia Eagles to a one-year contract on July 29, 2011. Upon signing, Young declared the Eagles would become the "Dream Team", a label which would become highly publicized by media outlets.

Young's first start as an Eagle came on November 20, 2011, in a Sunday Night Football match up against the New York Giants. Young played quarterback in the Eagles' 17–10 win, finishing the game with 258 passing yards, two touchdowns, and three interceptions. The Eagles subsequently lost Young's second start of the season, 38–20 the following week against the New England Patriots. Young finished with 400 yards with one touchdown and one interception in a losing effort. In his third and final start the following week, Young threw one touchdown and four interceptions as the Eagles lost to the Seattle Seahawks 31–14, dropping the Eagles record to 4–8 and Young's record as a starter to 1–2 on the season.

=== Final NFL years ===
Young signed a one-year deal with the Buffalo Bills on May 11, 2012. He was released by the team on August 27, 2012.

On August 6, 2013, Young signed a one-year contract with the Green Bay Packers. He was released by the team on August 31, 2013.

On May 1, 2014, Young signed a one-year contract with the Cleveland Browns. He was released by the team on May 12, 2014.

=== Saskatchewan Roughriders ===
In early February 2017, the Saskatchewan Roughriders of the Canadian Football League (CFL) added Young to their negotiation list. A couple weeks later Leigh Steinberg, Young's agent, confirmed he had conducted talks on behalf of his client with the Roughriders. On March 8, 2017, Young was rumored to be signing with the Roughriders imminently.

On March 9, 2017, the Roughriders held a press conference to formally announce the signing of Young. Young entered training camp fighting alongside Bryan Bennett and Brandon Bridge for the backup quarterback position to CFL-veteran Kevin Glenn. On June 6, 2017, partway through training camp, Young suffered a hamstring injury. On June 12, 2017, following the team's first preseason game, it was announced that Young would miss 4–6 weeks with a torn hamstring. Five days later, he was waived by the Roughriders.

== Career statistics ==
=== NFL ===
==== Regular season ====
Year	Team	Games			Passing								Rushing				Sacks		Fumbles (Note: Fumbles lost data taken from Pro Football Reference career game log)	
Year	Team	GP	GS	Record	Cmp	Att	Pct	Yds	Y/A	TD	Int	Rtg	Att	Yds	Avg	TD	Sck	SckY	Fum	Lost
2006	TEN	**15**	13	8–5	184	357	51.5	2,199	6.2	**12**	13	66.7	83	**552**	**6.7**	**7**	**25**	129	**12**	3
2007	TEN	**15**	**15**	9–6	**238**	**382**	**62.3**	**2,546**	6.7	9	**17**	71.1	**93**	395	4.2	3	**25**	**157**	10	3
2008	TEN	3	1	1–0	22	36	61.1	219	6.1	1	2	64.5	8	27	3.4	0	3	13	2	0
2009	TEN	12	10	**8–2**	152	259	58.7	1,879	7.3	10	7	82.8	55	281	5.1	2	9	36	8	2
2010	TEN	9	8	4–4	93	156	59.6	1,255	**8.0**	10	3	**98.6**	25	125	5.0	0	13	80	6	**4**
2011	PHI	6	3	1–2	66	114	57.9	866	7.6	4	9	60.8	18	79	4.4	0	8	34	2	0
Career		60	50	31–19	755	1,304	57.9	8,964	6.9	46	51	74.4	282	1,459	5.2	12	83	449	40	12

==== Playoffs ====
Year	Team	Games			Passing								Rushing				Sacks		Fumbles	
Year	Team	GP	GS	Record	Cmp	Att	Pct	Yds	Y/A	TD	Int	Rtg	Att	Yds	Avg	TD	Sck	SckY	Fum	Lost
2007	TEN	1	1	0–1	16	29	55.2	138	4.8	0	1	53.5	2	12	6.0	0	3	9	0	0
2008	TEN	0	0	DNP																
Career		1	1	0–1	16	29	55.2	138	4.8	0	1	53.5	2	12	6.0	0	3	9	0	0

=== College ===
Legend
	Won the CFP National Championship
**Bold**	Career high

Season	Team	Games			Passing								Rushing			
Season	Team	GP	GS	Record	Cmp	Att	Pct	Yds	Avg	TD	Int	Rate	Att	Yds	Avg	TD
2003	Texas	12	7	6–1	84	143	58.7	1,155	8.1	6	7	130.6	135	998	**7.4**	11
2004	Texas	12	12	11–1	148	250	59.2	1,849	7.4	12	**11**	128.4	**167**	**1,079**	6.5	**14**
2005	Texas	**13**	**13**	**13–0**	**212**	**325**	**65.2**	**3,036**	**9.3**	**26**	10	**163.9**	155	1,050	6.8	12
Career		37	32	30–2	444	718	61.8	6,040	8.4	44	28	144.9	457	3,127	6.8	37

== Career highlights ==
=== Awards and honors ===
NFL

- 2× Pro Bowl selection (2006, 2009)
- 2006 NFL Rookie of the Week Awards (four separate weekly awards)
- 2006 NFL AP Offensive Rookie of the Year
- 2006 Diet Pepsi NFL Rookie of the Year

College

- 2006 – ESPY Award for Best Championship Performance
- 2006 – ESPY Award for Best Game (2006 Rose Bowl; joint award shared between Texas and USC – accepted award along with Matt Leinart).
- 2006 – Big 12 Male Athlete of the Year (for 2005–2006 scholastic year)
- 2006 – Manning Award winner
- 2006 – Rose Bowl MVP (at end of 2005 season)
- 2005 – BCS National Championship
- 2005 – The Cingular All-America Player of the Year Award
- 2005 – Consensus All-American
- 2005 – The Maxwell Award – College Player of the Year
- 2005 – Davey O'Brien National Quarterback Award
- 2005 – 1st Team All-Big 12 Conference honors (unanimous decision)
- 2005 – Rose Bowl Most Valuable Player (at end of 2004 season)
- 2003 – Big 12 Conference Offensive Freshman of the Year
- Texas Longhorns #10 retired

=== Accomplishments and records ===
- Young was the first player in NCAA I-A history to pass for 3,000 yards and rush for 1,000 yards in the same season.
- Young owns five of the top seven single-game quarterback rushing performances in UT history: 267 yards vs Oklahoma State as a Junior; 200 yards vs USC as a Junior; 192 yards vs. Michigan as a Sophomore; 163 yards vs. Nebraska as a Freshman; 158 yards at Texas Tech as a Sophomore.
- Young has six of the top 8 longest runs by a quarterback in UT history.
- Young became the first player in UT history to pass and rush for 1,000 or more yards in the same season.
- Young became the first quarterback in UT history to have three 100-yard rushing games (vs. Oklahoma, at Baylor, vs. Nebraska) in the same season and is tied with Ricky Williams (1995) for the third-most 100-yard games by a freshman in school history.
- Young's 17 wins and 43 touchdowns accounted for in 2003–2004 were the most ever by a UT quarterback in their first two years. However, Colt McCoy surpassed both of these, accounting for 57 touchdowns and 20 wins in 2006–2007.
- Young is a two-time winner of the Rose Bowl MVP award, joining Ron Dayne, Bob Schloredt, and Charles White as the only two-time winners.
- He passed for 44 touchdowns (No. 4 in UT history)
- Rose Bowl Record & BCS Championship Game Record – Total yards (467)
- Rose Bowl Record – Touchdowns responsible for (5), tied by Mark Sanchez in 2009
- Rose Bowl Record & BCS Record- Net rushing yards by a quarterback (200), broke his own record
- Rose Bowl Record – Points responsible for (30), tied by Mark Sanchez in 2009
- Bowl Record – Net rushing yards by a quarterback (201), tied by Dwight Dasher in the 2009 New Orleans Bowl, then surpassed by Johnny Manziel (229) in the 2013 Cotton Bowl Classic
- BCS Record – Total yards (467), surpassed by Tim Tebow in 2009
- BCS Record – Touchdowns responsible for (5), tied Matt Leinart, tied by Mark Sanchez in 2009
- BCS Record – Rushing touchdowns (4), tied Dominick Davis and Ron Dayne
- BCS Record – Points Scored (24), tied Dominick Davis and Ron Dayne
- BCS Record & BCS Championship Game Record – Most rushing yards per attempt (10.53)
- BCS Championship Game Record – Rushing yards (200)
- BCS Championship Game Record – Net rushing yards by a quarterback (200)
- BCS Championship Game Record – Rushing touchdowns (3), tied LenDale White in same game
- BCS Championship Game Record – Pass completions (30)
- BCS Championship Game Record – Passes without an interception (40)
- BCS Championship Game Record – Completion percentage (75.0%)
- BCS Championship Game Record – Points Scored (20), tied Peter Warrick
- UT Record – Touchdown passes, season (26), tied with Chris Simms, surpassed by Colt McCoy
- UT Record – Passing completion percentage, careers (61.8%), surpassed by McCoy
- UT Record – Total Offense, game (506)
- UT Record – Total Offense, season (4,086), surpassed by McCoy
- UT Record – Total Offense, career (9,167), surpassed by McCoy
- UT Record – Average gain per play, season (8.5 yards)
- UT Record – Average gain per play, career (7.8 yards)
- UT Record – Pass completion percentage, game (86.2%) against Colorado in 2005, surpassed by McCoy
- UT Record – Pass completion percentage, career (61.8%) (min 100 attempts), surpassed by McCoy in 2009
- UT Record – Wins by a quarterback, Career (30), surpassed by McCoy
- UT Record – Longest run by a Quarterback (80 yards)
- UT Record – Most rushing yards by a Quarterback, game (267), against Oklahoma State, broke his own record previously set against Michigan
- UT Record – Most rushing yards by a Quarterback, career (3,127), also 5th best by any UT player
- UT Record – Most rushing touchdowns by a quarterback, season (14), surpassed by Sam Ehlinger in 2018
- UT Record – Most rushing touchdowns by a quarterback, career (37), also 4th best by any UT player
- UT Record – Most games rushing and passing for more than 100 yards, career (5 games)
- UT Record – Most 300 yard total offense games, season (6), tied by and then surpassed by McCoy
- UT Record – Most 300 yard total offense games, career (10), surpassed by McCoy
- UT Record – Most 400 yard total offense games, season (2), tied by and then surpassed by McCoy
- UT Record – Most 400 yard total offense games, career (4)
- UT Record – Most 500 yard total offense games, season (1)
- UT Record – Most 500 yard total offense games, career (1)
- UT Record – Most Offensive yards, game (506 yards), against Oklahoma State on October 29, 2005, broke his own record
- UT Record – Most 100 yard rushing games by a quarterback, season (3 games), tied his own record twice
- Big 12 & UT Record – Passing efficiency, season (163.9), surpassed by Sam Bradford in 2007 for Big 12 and McCoy for UT
- Big 12 & UT Record – Win/loss record as a starter of 30–2 gives him a .938 winning percentage as a starting quarterback. This also ranks sixth best in NCAA Division I football history.
- Big 12 & UT Record – Yards per rush, career (6.8)
- In the Rose Bowl on January 4, 2006, the BCS National Championship, he completed 30 of 40 passes for 267 yards and carried the ball 19 times for 200 yards and 3 rushing touchdowns. Those 200 rushing yards set a Bowl game rushing record by a QB. He was named Rose Bowl MVP for the second time in his career. UT beat USC by the score of 41 to 38 and Vince Young ran in the winning touchdown. In this game, UT ended USC's 34-game win streak. Young's 467 total yards set a new Rose Bowl record.

== Retirement, post-NFL career ==
On June 14, 2014, Young announced his retirement. After announcing his retirement, he did say for a "guaranteed offer", he would come out of retirement. Young stated he also planned to work at the University of Texas in some form following his retirement. On August 14, 2014, Young had been hired by the University of Texas to work for its Division of Diversity and Community Engagement as a development officer for program alumni relations and raising money for programs that assist first-generation and low-income college students. His employment with the University of Texas ended on March 9, 2019, due to poor performances and absences, having been given job warnings dating back to 2017. In 2021, he was hired by the University of Texas as a special assistant in the athletic department.

In 2025, Young hosted a podcast with Mack Brown called The Stampede, moderated by KEYE-TV sports director Bob Ballou. The program covers both the current Texas football team as well as memories of Young's tenure with the Longhorns.

== Personal life ==
As a result of his strong on-field performance and his ties to the Houston area, January 10, 2006, was proclaimed "Vince Young Day" in his hometown. The Texas Senate passed a resolution on February 20, 2007, to declare the day "Vince Young Day" throughout the state.

Young has been in a number of television commercials for Madden 08 (for which he was on the cover), Reebok with Allen Iverson, and Campbell's Chunky Soup. He appears in rapper Mike Jones's video, "My 64". Young was also interviewed by 60 Minutes for an episode that was aired on September 30, 2007.

Young re-enrolled at the University of Texas for the 2008 spring semester. In 2013, Young graduated from Texas with a degree in youth and community studies from the College of Education.

Young continues to live in Houston's Hiram Clarke neighborhood. Young's grandmother, Betty, lives in the Sunnyside area of Houston.

=== Disappearance ===
On September 9, 2008, a distraught Young left his home without his cell phone. The reasons given were that Young was upset over being booed by fans after throwing a second interception against the visiting Jacksonville Jaguars the previous day and the sprained medial collateral ligament in his left knee suffered four plays after head coach Jeff Fisher prodded him back into the game. Young postponed a doctor's examination until the following day. After speaking to members of Young's family, Fisher called Nashville police. After a four-hour search, they found Young, who agreed to meet with Fisher and police at the team's training facility.

In regard to the incident, Young's mother (Felicia Young) stated that her son was "hurting inside and out."

=== Financial problems ===
In September 2012, the Associated Press reported that Young had spent much of the $34 million salary he earned in the NFL and was facing financial problems after defaulting on a $1.9 million high interest payday loan. Young filed a lawsuit seeking to stop the lender, Pro Player Funding LLC, from enforcing a judgment of nearly $1.7 million with a claim that the loan documents were forged and he did not knowingly execute the loan. However, Young had authorized $1 million in loan payments to Pro Player directly from his Eagles salary prior to defaulting and Young's signatures on loan documents were notarized. Young also filed lawsuits against his former agent, Major Adams, and a North Carolina financial planner, Ronnie Peoples, alleging that they misappropriated $5.5 million of funds. When asked to give a general assessment of Young's finances, Young's attorney, Trey Dolezal, stated "I would just say that Vince needs a job." Young's financial problems have reportedly been a result of lavish spending and, by his account, the betrayal of trusted advisers.

In addition to the $34 million salary during his career in the NFL, Young had signed $30 million in endorsement deals with Reebok, Campbell's Soup, Madden NFL, Vizio and the National Dairy Council.

In January 2014, Young filed for Chapter 11 bankruptcy in a Houston federal bankruptcy court. On January 30, Young petitioned the court to dismiss the bankruptcy filing due to a settlement with Adams and Peoples, and a resulting settlement with Pro Player Funding.

=== Lawsuits ===
In December 2008, Young filed suit against former Major League Baseball player Enos Cabell and two others for applying for a trademark to use his initials and "Invinceable" nickname to sell products without his permission in 2006. The suit claims that their use of Young's name has damaged endorsement deals for Young; he asked the court to give him the exclusive rights to use the initials and nickname.

=== Impersonator ===
On September 23, 2011, Stephan Pittman, a registered sex offender in Maryland, was arrested on felony fraud charges for impersonating Young.

=== Legal issues ===
On January 25, 2016, Young was arrested for DWI in Austin, Texas. He pleaded no contest, was fined $300, and ordered to undergo 60 hours of community service.

On February 5, 2019, Young was arrested for DWI in Fort Bend County, Texas. He was released on a $500 bail the same day. The charges were dismissed on August 25, 2020, after he completed a diversion program.

== See also ==
- Madden Curse
