= Michael Arceneaux =

American writer

- Born: Michael Joseph Arceneaux; April 12, 1984 (age 41); Houston, Texas
- Education: Howard University
- Occupation: Writer
- Era: 21st century
- Notable work: I Can't Date Jesus
- Website: michael-arceneaux.com

Michael Arceneaux (born April 12, 1984) is an American writer. He is the author of three essay collections: I Can't Date Jesus (2018, a New York Times bestselling book), I Don't Want to Die Poor (2020), and I Finally Bought Some Jordans (2024).

== Early life ==
Michael Joseph Arceneaux was born April 12, 1984, in Houston, Texas, to a working-class Black family from Louisiana. His mother, a registered nurse, was a devout Catholic, and Arceneaux was raised in the church, even briefly considering the priesthood.

Arceneaux, from the Hiram Clarke community, attended Madison High School in Houston. With a combination of scholarships and student loans, he enrolled at Howard University, where he majored in broadcast journalism and wrote for campus newspaper The Hilltop. He graduated in 2007, becoming the first man in his family to graduate from college.

== Career ==
After college, Arceneaux moved to Los Angeles, where he began his writing career. He was an intern at MTV News, and later a columnist for the website. He has written for The Guardian, New York magazine, Essence, Rolling Stone, Teen Vogue, BuzzFeed, Vulture, The Washington Post, The New York Times, and XOJane, as well as writing an advice column, called "Dearly Beloved", at Into.

=== Books ===
==== I Can't Date Jesus ====
Arceneaux's first book, a collection of 17 humorous personal essays entitled I Can't Date Jesus: Love, Sex, Family, Race, and Other Reasons I’ve Put My Faith in Beyoncé, was published on July 24, 2018 from Atria Books. The book debuted at number 14 on The New York Times best-seller list for paperback nonfiction. It focuses on his early life as a young Black gay man growing up in a religious household in the southern United States. The book's title arises in response to Arceneaux's Catholic upbringing and its implications for him as a gay man, particularly the idea that even if being gay was not a choice, he should not act on it. Finding that theological debates on the subject did not tend to prove fruitful, Arceneaux decided, "Easier to just clarify, 'I plan to have sex, so I can't date Jesus.'" Arceneaux completed the manuscript in 2011, but the search for an agent delayed the book's publication. Ultimately he signed with Jim McCarthy, who had originally declined his query but Arceneaux persisted, sending him more essays to read and McCarthy changed his mind.

Reviewers have compared Arceneaux's essay collection to the work of Roxane Gay, David Sedaris, and Samantha Irby. In Vogue, Chloe Schama and Bridget Read noted Arceneaux's "hysterically funny, vulnerable" style, calling the collection "a triumph of self-exploration, tinged with but not overburdened by his reckoning with our current political moment...The result is a piece of personal and cultural storytelling that is as fun as it is illuminating."

==== I Don't Want to Die Poor ====
Arceneaux's second book, I Don't Want to Die Poor (2020), expands on his essay for The New York Times describing his private student loan debt.

=== I Finally Bought Some Jordans ===
Arceneaux’s third book, I Finally Bought Some Jordans, was scheduled to be released on March 12, 2024.

== See also ==
- History of African Americans in Houston
- LGBT culture in Houston
- Christianity in Houston
