= Almeda, Houston =

Area in Houston, Texas, US

Coordinates: 29.604122°N 95.4171624°W

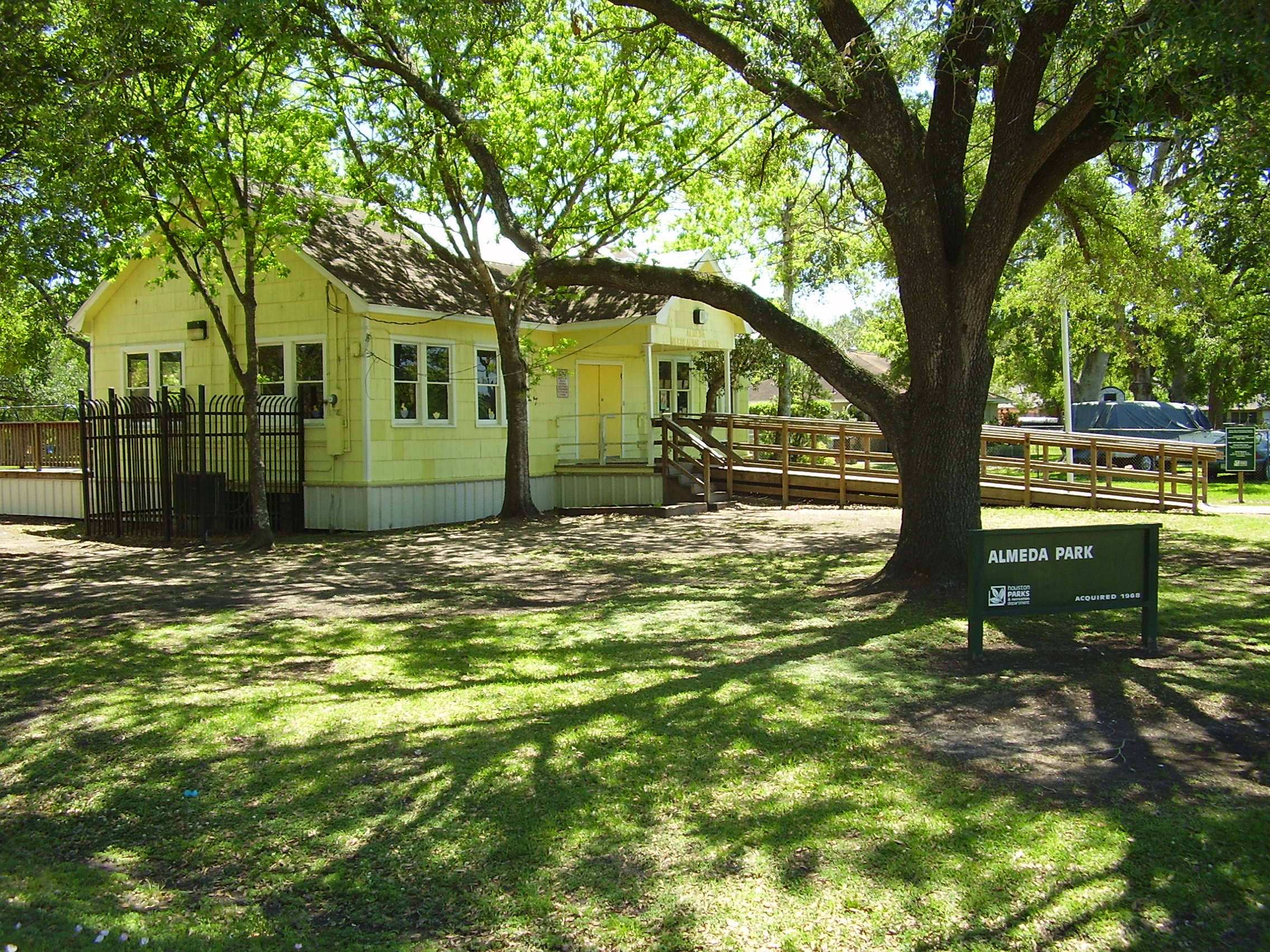
Almeda Park and Community Center

Almeda is an area located along Texas State Highway 288 and the Missouri Pacific Railroad in Southwest Houston, Texas, United States that used to be a distinct unincorporated community in Harris County. Almeda is 11 miles (18 km) from Downtown Houston.

== History ==
Dr. Willis King promoted the Almeda area in the early 1880s. The community's name comes from Almeda King, the promoter's daughter. The town, along the International-Great Northern Railroad, functioned as a trading area for agriculture and lumber. In 1893 Almeda, with 50 people, received a post office. Almeda had 200 people, two general stores, and a lumber company in 1914. In 1925 the community had 80 residents. Almeda had four businesses in the 1930s. 1936 state highway maps indicated several buildings in the area. In 1948 the community had 125 residents. In the 1950s, Almeda had 20 buildings. Around 1953 the community had 1,750 residents. The post office closed in 1959. By 1960 Almeda residents continued to lack public water and fire department services. Almeda had 40 buildings in the 1960s. In 1962 Almeda had 1,200 residents. Almeda first received sewers in 1963. In the 1980s Almeda had a school, three churches, an abandoned railroad station, and scattered houses. As of 1998 Almeda was still a rural area.

== Government and infrastructure ==
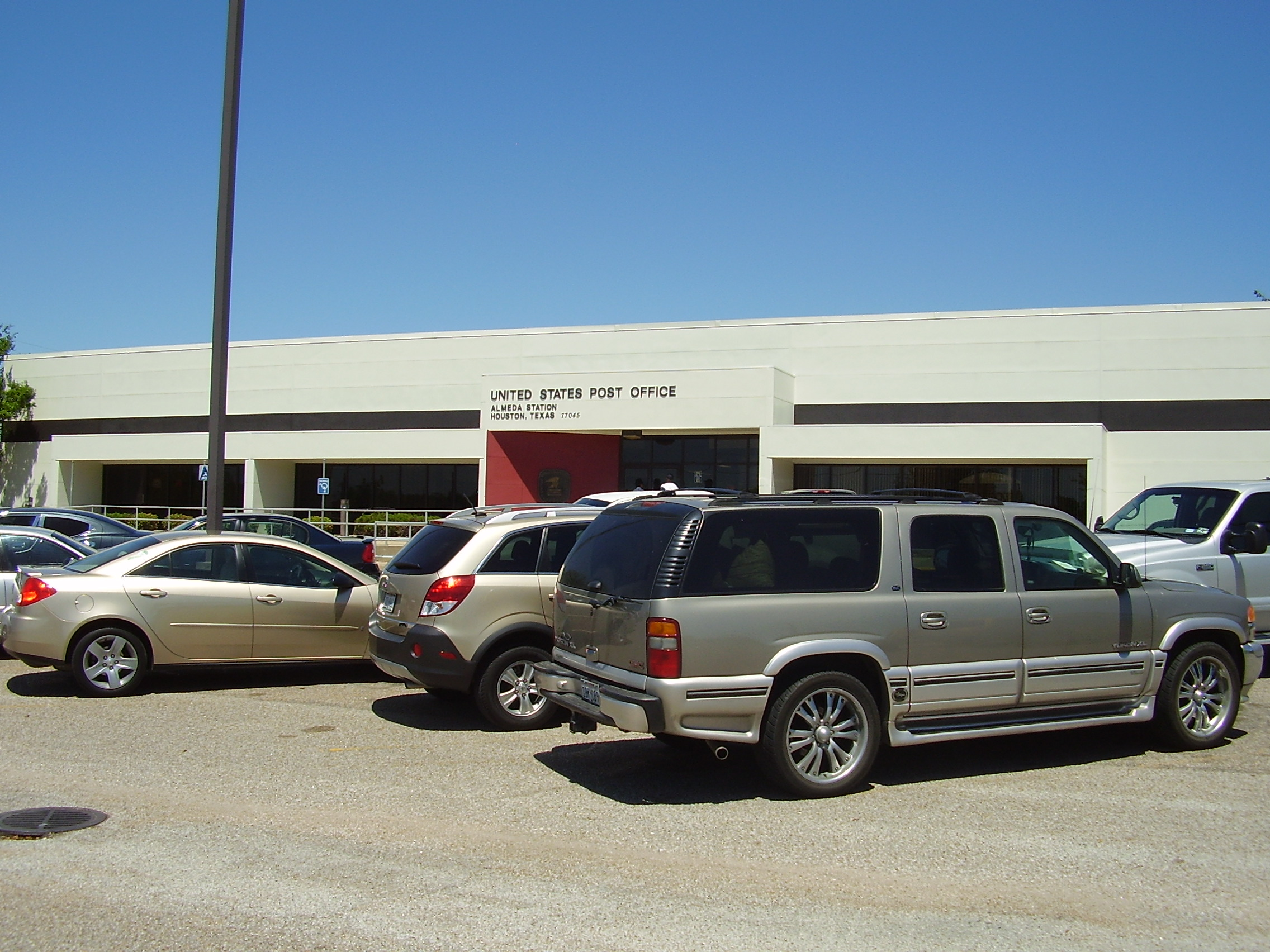
Almeda Station Post Office

=== Local government ===
Houston City Council districts D and K serve portions of Almeda. Previously all of City Council District D served Almeda.

The community is served by the Houston Police Department Southwest Patrol Division, headquartered at 4503 Beechnut Street.

=== County, state, and federal representation ===
Almeda is located in District 131 of the Texas House of Representatives. As of 2008, Alma A. Allen represents the district. Genoa is within District 13 of the Texas Senate; as of 2008 Rodney Ellis represents that district.

Almeda is in Texas's 9th congressional district. As of 2008, Al Green represents the district. The United States Postal Service operates the Almeda Post Office at 3030 West Fuqua Street.

== Education ==
=== Primary and secondary schools ===
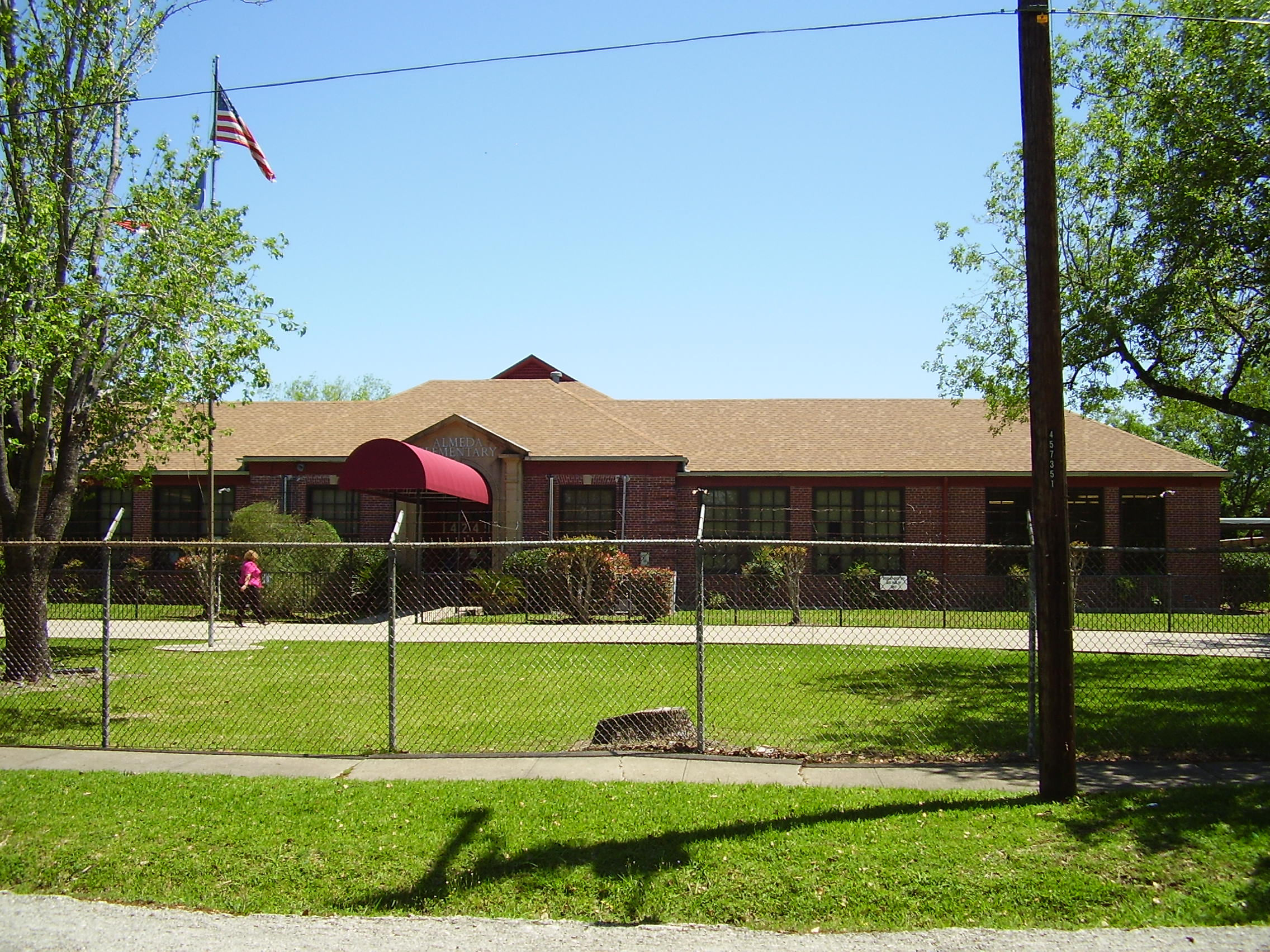
The former Almeda Elementary School building

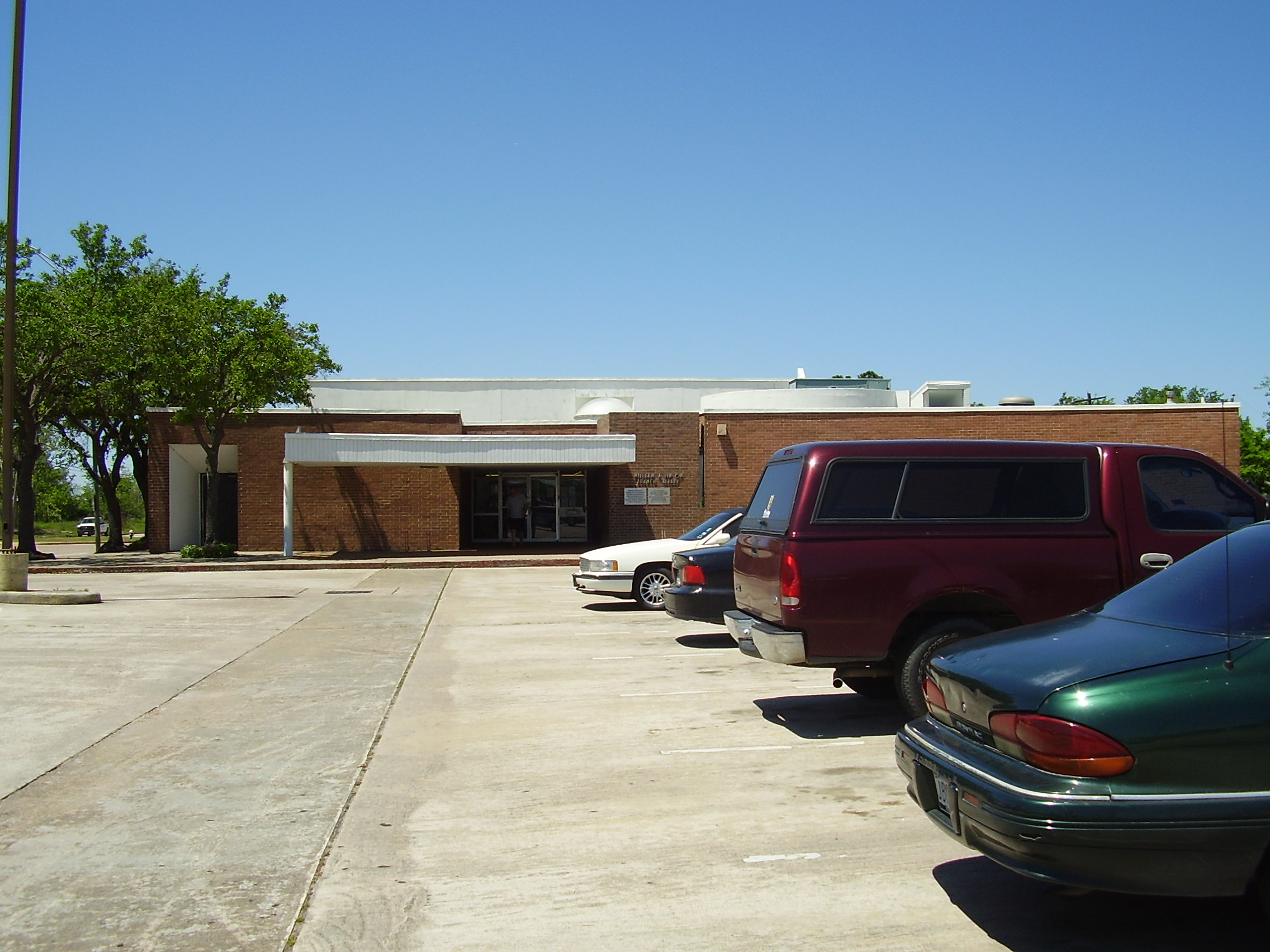
Former location of the Vinson Neighborhood Library

Almeda is within the Houston Independent School District (HISD). Almeda is within Trustee District IX, represented by Lawrence Marshall as of 2008.

Almeda Elementary School serves the area east of Almeda Road. As of 1998, 60% of the students were Hispanic and Latino. Since 1994 and as of 1998 the school used the "Success For All" reading program for its English language classes. For bilingual English-Spanish classes it uses "Exito Para Todos," the Spanish version. As of the same year, many parents have some English fluency, but take English classes four days per week in order to improve it. Residents east of Almeda Road are zoned to Audrey H. Lawson Middle School (formerly Dick Dowling Middle School). Residents west of Almeda Road, for K-8, are zoned to Billy Reagan K-8 School. Residents east of Almeda Road are zoned to Worthing High School. while residents west of Almeda Road are zoned to Madison High School.

The Almeda School District was established in 1893; students originally attended school in a barn and utilized hay stacks as desks. A white one room school building opened in 1894. The first permanent school in Almeda opened in 1901. In 1905 Almeda's school had one teacher and 31 students. State highway maps indicated two schools within one mile of Almeda in 1936. During that year the Almeda area became a part of HISD. In 1981 a new Almeda Elementary School campus opened. The current Almeda campus opened in February 2011. Until the fall of 2011, residents east of Almeda Road were zoned to Woodson K-8 School, while residents west of Almeda Road were zoned to Lawson Middle School. From fall 2011 to fall 2012, all students were zoned to Lawson Middle School. Prior to fall 2012, all students were zoned to Almeda Elementary School. Beginning in fall 2012 portions of the old Almeda Elementary and Lawson zones were rezoned to Reagan K-8.

=== Public libraries ===
Houston Public Library operates the Vinson Neighborhood Library at 3100 West Fuqua Street. The original facility had structural issues and leaks. In Fall 2009 the library moved to a new location away from the Almeda community. By December 2009 the former library facility was for sale.

== Parks and recreation ==
The City of Houston Parks and Recreation Department operates the Almeda Park and the Almeda Community Center at 14201 Almeda School Road. The community center includes a playground.

== See also ==
- Almeda
