= Village at Glen Iris, Houston =

Human settlement in Houston, Texas, US

Coordinates: 29.63°N 95.44°W

Village at Glen Iris is a group of subdivisions in Houston, Texas.

Village at Glen Iris is located in southern Houston near Almeda Road. Glen Iris was affected by a wave of foreclosures in the 1980s. From the beginning of 1990 until October 1991, the prices of the houses declined by 14%. As of 1994, of 400 subdivisions surveyed by the Houston Chronicle, Glen Iris had the lowest house prices, with $17.08 per square foot.

Angel Lane, a subdivision that is a part of the Village at Glen Iris, is a group of sixty-five homes built after Hurricane Katrina hit New Orleans. Oprah Winfrey started a donation network and donated some of her personal money to get the ball rolling and purchase land. She then teamed up with Habitat for Humanity and the hurricane survivors to build new houses for those that made the decision to resettle in the greater Houston area. The community consists of families that were affected by hurricanes Katrina and Rita.

== Education ==
Depending on the address, Glen Iris residents may be assigned to different elementary schools:

- Hobby Elementary School (Includes residents of Angel Lane)
- Montgomery Elementary school
- Petersen Elementary School

Effective 2026, Hobby Elementary will move onto the property of Lawson Middle while remaining a separate institution.

All Glen Iris residents are zoned to:

- Lawson Middle School (formerly Dowling Middle School)
- Madison High School

== Police service ==
The neighborhood is within the Houston Police Department's Southwest Patrol Division .
