= I Can't Date Jesus =

Book by Michael Arceneaux

I Can’t Date Jesus: Love, Sex, Family, Race, and Other Reasons I’ve Put My Faith in Beyoncé
- First edition
- Author: Michael Arceneaux
- Audio read by: Michael Arceneaux
- Language: English
- Genre: Non-fiction essays
- Publisher: Atria Books
- Publication date: July 24, 2018

I Can’t Date Jesus: Love, Sex, Family, Race, and Other Reasons I’ve Put My Faith in Beyoncé is a 2018 collection of essays by Michael Arceneaux. Published by Atria Books, the collection includes seventeen essays, discussing Arceneaux's conflicting identities, his internalized homophobia, his journey as a writer, and his experiences dating. It also discusses his passion for the singer Beyoncé, who shares his hometown of Houston, Texas.

Arceneaux was previously a Roman Catholic, and is a gay African-American. This is his first book. It was released on July 24, 2018.

== Development ==
According to Arceneaux, "I wanted to write about my life with a mix of pathos and humor—the same way a lot of white male authors like David Sedaris and Augusten Burroughs get to write about their lives."

In 2011 the writing process was complete, but Arceneaux did not publish it until 2018 because he needed an agent and publisher. Dystel, Goderich, & Bourret agent Jim McCarthy initially declined to represent Arceneaux but changed his mind after reading some of Arceneaux's essays. Rakesh Satyal of Altria became his editor; according to Arceneaux his supervision strengthened his book.

Arceneaux had a conversation with his mother, who believed God opposes homosexuality, and his title is a reference to that conversation. She stated that since she knew he had sex with another man, she was not confident that he was going to go to heaven. He stated that the best response to a religious person who interprets his or her religion as being opposed to homosexuality is "I plan to have sex, so I can’t date Jesus." He first finished the book and then selected its title.

== Contents ==
Michelle Raji of the Texas Observer stated that the book's construction as a "series of explanations" is similar to those of self-help books, making it "a logical extension of the polemic, confessional style he’s perfected online" as well as being "accessible to a larger audience".

One essay discusses how he does not have an admiration for whiteness because his parents deliberately took him to African-American healthcare personnel, he attended primary and secondary schools that had mostly African-American and Hispanic and Latino students, and he attended a historically black university.

In "The Place Is No Sanctuary" he discusses homophobia in black-owned barbershops, which are for non-gay blacks places to socialize.

In "I See A Priest in You" he received a suggestion that he become a priest, but Arceneaux decides not to do this.

"You Will Die Poor" discusses his life as a low income resident of Los Angeles.

"The First, the Worst" and "Learning How to Ho and Date and Failing at Both" discuss his romantic life.

In Chapter 15 the author discusses his political views regarding the President Donald Trump and his administration, as well as Arceneaux's coming out to his mother.

== Reception ==
In Vogue, Chloe Schama and Bridget Read noted Arceneaux's "hysterically funny, vulnerable" style, calling the collection "a triumph of self-exploration, tinged with but not overburdened by his reckoning with our current political moment...The result is a piece of personal and cultural storytelling that is as fun as it is illuminating."

Savas Abadsidis of The Advocate stated that the book's humor is similar to that of David Sedaris. According to Tre'vell Anderson of the Los Angeles Times, observers also compared the writing to that of Samantha Irby.

Raji stated that the book "is an admirable attempt to reverse" a dynamic of mostly white-owned media stakeholders asking for racial ethnic minorities to "lead with his otherness, to write [one's] identity not just as a perspective but as a spectacle", and that I Can't Date Jesus has "a little more story and a little less spectacle." According to Raji, "the high-wire act between fun and serious does not land" in about half of the essays, including the romance-related ones, but that the "standout essay on sexual racism and interracial dating redeems these false starts." She also described the priest essay as a "standout".

Publishers Weekly stated that the book's "confident voice and unapologetic sense of humor will appeal to fans of Roxane Gay."

Kirkus Reviews described it as "A funny, fierce, and bold memoir in essays."

== See also ==
- History of the African Americans in Houston
- LGBT culture in Houston
- Christianity in Houston
