= 1958 Western Kentucky Hilltoppers football team =

American college football season

1958 Western Kentucky Hilltoppers football
- Conference: Ohio Valley Conference
- Record: 4–5 (2–4 OVC)
- Head coach: Nick Denes (2nd season)
- Captains: Rod Bagby; Jim "Yogi" Hardin

1958 Ohio Valley Conference football standings
	Conf.					Overall
Team	W		L		T	W		L		T
No. 11 Middle Tennessee +	5	–	1	–	0	8	–	2	–	0
Tennessee Tech +	5	–	1	–	0	7	–	3	–	0
East Tennessee State	4	–	2	–	0	5	–	4	–	0
Eastern Kentucky	3	–	3	–	0	3	–	6	–	0
Western Kentucky	2	–	4	–	0	4	–	5	–	0
Murray State	2	–	4	–	0	3	–	7	–	0
Morehead State	0	–	6	–	0	0	–	8	–	1
+ – Conference co-champions; Rankings from UPI small college poll

The 1958 Western Kentucky Hilltoppers football team represented Western Kentucky State College (now known as Western Kentucky University) as a member of the Ohio Valley Conference (OVC) during the 1958 college football season. Led by second-year head coach Nick Denes, the Hilltoppers compiled an overall record of 4–5 with a mark of 2–4 in conference play, tying for fifth place in the OVC. The team's captains were Rod Bagby and Jim "Yogi" Hardin.

== Schedule ==
Date	Opponent	Site	Result	Attendance
September 20	Southeast Missouri State*	Bowling Green, KY	W 12–0	1,196
September 27	at East Tennessee State	Johnson City, TN	L 0–8	
October 4	No. 12 Middle Tennessee	Bowling Green, KY (rivalry)	L 7–10	5,319
October 11	at Youngstown State*	Youngstown, OH	L 6–20	
October 18	at Tennessee Tech	Cookeville, TN	L 3–7	
November 1	Eastern Kentucky^{†}	Bowling Green, KY (rivalry)	W 21–14	4,042
November 8	at Morehead State	Morehead, KY	W 14–0	
November 15	Austin Peay*	Bowling Green, KY	W 34–16	3,762
November 22	at Murray State	Cutchin Stadium; Murray, KY (rivalry)	L 7–12	
*Non-conference game; ^{†}Homecoming; Rankings from UPI Poll released prior to the game
