= 1964 Western Kentucky Hilltoppers football team =

American college football season

1964 Western Kentucky Hilltoppers football
- Conference: Ohio Valley Conference
- Record: 6–3–1 (3–3–1 OVC)
- Head coach: Nick Denes (7th season)
- Captains: Stan Napper; Ken Waller

1964 Ohio Valley Conference football standings
	Conf.					Overall
Team	W		L		T	W		L		T
Middle Tennessee $	6	–	1	–	0	7	–	2	–	1
Austin Peay	5	–	1	–	1	8	–	1	–	1
Western Kentucky	3	–	3	–	1	6	–	3	–	1
Murray State	3	–	3	–	1	5	–	4	–	1
Morehead State	3	–	4	–	0	5	–	4	–	0
East Tennessee State	3	–	4	–	0	5	–	5	–	0
Eastern Kentucky	2	–	4	–	1	3	–	5	–	1
Tennessee Tech	1	–	6	–	0	1	–	9	–	0
$ – Conference champion

The 1964 Western Kentucky Hilltoppers football team represented Western Kentucky State College (now known as Western Kentucky University) as a member of the Ohio Valley Conference (OVC) during the 1964 NCAA College Division football season. Led by seventh-year head coach Nick Denes, the Hilltoppers compiled an overall record of 6–3–1 with a mark of 3–3–1 in conference play, tying for third place in the OVC. The team's captains were Stan Napper and Ken Waller.

== Schedule ==
Date	Opponent	Site	Result	Attendance	Source
September 19	Southeast Missouri State*	Bowling Green, KY	W 14–0	7,396	
September 26	at East Tennessee State	Johnson City, TN	L 9–16	6,528	
October 3	Middle Tennessee	Bowling Green, KY (rivalry)	L 0–9	8,041–8,500	
October 10	Austin Peay	Bowling Green, KY	T 6–6	9,342	
October 17	at Tennessee Tech	Cookeville, TN	W 19–14	6,915–8,000	
October 24	at Evansville*	Evansville, IN	W 37–0	7,932–8,000	
October 31	Eastern Kentucky^{†}	Bowling Green, KY (rivalry)	W 24–0	10,041	
November 7	at Morehead State	Jayne Stadium; Morehead, KY	W 9–0	5,000–10,000	
November 14	Olivet*	Bowling Green, KY	W 44–20	6,611–6,661	
November 21	at Murray State	Cutchin Stadium; Murray, KY (rivalry)	L 7–14	5,000–8,200	
*Non-conference game; ^{†}Homecoming
