= 2002 Murray State Racers football team =

American college football season

2002 Murray State Racers football

OVC champion

NCAA Division I-AA First Round, L 20–59 vs. Western Kentucky
- Conference: Ohio Valley Conference

Ranking
- Sports Network: No. 20
- Record: 7–5 (5–1 OVC)
- Head coach: Joe Pannunzio (3rd season)
- Home stadium: Roy Stewart Stadium

2002 Ohio Valley Conference football standings
	Conf.			Overall
Team	W		L	W		L
No. 13 Eastern Illinois +^	5	–	1	8	–	4
No. 20 Murray State +^	5	–	1	7	–	5
No. 21 Eastern Kentucky	4	–	2	8	–	4
No. 24 Southeast Missouri State	4	–	2	8	–	4
Tennessee Tech	2	–	4	5	–	7
Tennessee State	1	–	5	2	–	10
Tennessee–Martin	0	–	6	2	–	10
+ – Conference co-champions; ^ – NCAA Division I-AA playoff participant; Rankings from The Sports Network poll

The 2002 Murray State Racers football team represented Murray State University in the 2002 NCAA Division I-AA football season. The team was led by third-year head coach Joe Pannunzio and played their home games at Roy Stewart Stadium in Murray, Kentucky. The Racers finished the season with a 7–5 overall record and a 5–1 record in Ohio Valley Conference games, tying them with Eastern Illinois for the conference championship. They qualified for the Division I-AA playoffs, where they lost to Western Kentucky in the first round. Murray State was ranked No. 20 in The Sports Network's postseason Division I-AA poll.

== Schedule ==
Date	Opponent	Rank	Site	Result	Attendance	Source
August 31	at Memphis*		Liberty Bowl Memorial Stadium; Memphis, TN	L 6–52	29,694	
September 14	Southern Illinois*		Roy Stewart Stadium; Murray, KY	W 42–24	8,673	
September 21	at Illinois State*		Hancock Stadium; Normal, IL	L 23–24	7,674	
September 28	at Indiana State*		Memorial Stadium; Terre Haute, IN	L 31–34 ^{OT}	3,762	
October 12	Tennessee Tech^{†}		Roy Stewart Stadium; Murray, KY	W 31–14	8,307	
October 19	at No. 22 Eastern Kentucky		Roy Kidd Stadium; Richmond, KY	L 7–31	10,100	
October 26	Southeast Missouri State		Roy Stewart Stadium; Murray, KY	W 38–31	4,554	
November 2	Samford*		Roy Stewart Stadium; Murray, KY	W 54–17	2,580	
November 9	Tennessee State		Roy Stewart Stadium; Murray, KY	W 51–27	3,774	
November 16	at Tennessee–Martin		Graham Stadium; Martin, TN	W 42–3	2,342	
November 23	No. 2 Eastern Illinois		Roy Stewart Stadium; Murray, KY	W 37–35	6,112	
November 30	at No. 15 Western Kentucky*	No. 23	L. T. Smith Stadium; Bowling Green, KY (NCAA Division I-AA First Round, Battle for the Red Belt)	L 20–59	3,300	
*Non-conference game; ^{†}Homecoming; Rankings from The Sports Network Poll released prior to the game
