= 2002 Western Kentucky Hilltoppers football team =

American college football season

2002 Western Kentucky Hilltoppers football

NCAA Division I-AA champion Gateway co-champion

NCAA Division I-AA Championship Game, W 34–14 vs. McNeese State
- Conference: Gateway Football Conference

Ranking
- Sports Network: No. 1
- Record: 12–3 (7–1 Gateway)
- Head coach: Jack Harbaugh (14th season)
- Co-offensive coordinators: Willie Taggart (2nd season); Keven Lightner (2nd season)
- Offensive scheme: Multiple
- Defensive coordinator: David Elson (2nd season)
- Base defense: 3–4
- Home stadium: L. T. Smith Stadium

2002 Gateway Football Conference standings
	Conf.			Overall
Team	W		L	W		L
No. 1 Western Kentucky +^	6	–	1	12	–	3
No. 5 Western Illinois +^	6	–	1	11	–	2
Youngstown State	4	–	3	7	–	4
Illinois State	4	–	3	6	–	5
Indiana State	3	–	4	5	–	7
Northern Iowa	2	–	5	5	–	6
Southern Illinois	2	–	5	4	–	8
Southwest Missouri State	1	–	6	4	–	7
+ – Conference co-champions; ^ – NCAA Division I-AA playoff participant; Rankings from The Sports Network poll

The 2002 Western Kentucky Hilltoppers football team represented Western Kentucky University in the 2002 NCAA Division I-AA football season and were led by head coach Jack Harbaugh in his 14th and final season as head coach. They claimed a share of the Gateway Football Conference championship and made the school's third straight appearance in the NCAA Division I-AA playoffs. After a rocky start, the team rallied to win their last 10 games including the 2002 NCAA Division I-AA Football Championship Game, beating McNeese State, 34–14, in Chattanooga, Tennessee. The Hilltoppers finished the season ranked number 1 in both final 1AA postseason national polls.

This team won the school's first NCAA team championship and tied the program record for victories in a season set by the 1973 Western Kentucky Hilltoppers football team. Their roster included future National Football League (NFL) players Sherrod Coates, Jeremi Johnson, and Brian Claybourn, and future NFL coach Jason Michael. Coates, Chris Price, and Buster Ashley were named to the AP All American team and Harbuagh was named AFCA Coach of the Year Award. The All Conference team included Ashley, Coates, Price, Jeremy Chandler, Erik Dandy, Jon Frazier, and Daniel Withrow.

== Schedule ==
Date	Time	Opponent	Rank	Site	Result	Attendance	Source
August 31	6:10 pm	at Kansas State*	No. 18	KSU Stadium; Manhattan, KS	L 3–48	45,844	
September 7	5:30 pm	Kentucky State*	No. 22	L. T. Smith Stadium; Bowling Green, KY	W 49–0	9,500	
September 14	1:30 pm	Western Illinois	No. 21	L. T. Smith Stadium; Bowling Green, KY	L 0–14	6,000	
September 21	5:30 pm	No. 11 Youngstown State		L. T. Smith Stadium; Bowling Green, KY	W 13–7	10,100	
September 28	7:00 pm	at No. 2 McNeese State*	No. 25	Cowboy Stadium; Lake Charles, LA	L 13–38	16,840	
October 5	4:05 pm	at No. 6 Northern Iowa		UNI-Dome; Cedar Falls, IA	W 31–12	14,684	
October 12	5:30 pm	FIU*		L. T. Smith Stadium; Bowling Green, KY	W 56–7	6,000	
October 19	1:30 pm	at Southwest Missouri State	No. 24	Plaster Sports Complex; Springfield, MO	W 31–7	13,002	
October 26	4:30 pm	Indiana State^{†}	No. 22	L. T. Smith Stadium; Bowling Green, KY	W 24–7	11,200	
November 2	4:30 pm	Illinois State	No. 19	L. T. Smith Stadium; Bowling Green, KY	W 9–0	5,600	
November 16	1:30 pm	at Southern Illinois	No. 15	Saluki Stadium; Carbondale, IL	W 48–16	3,203	
November 30	1:00 pm	No. 23 Murray State*	No. 15	L. T. Smith Stadium; Bowling Green, KY (NCAA Division I-AA First Round, Battle for the Red Belt)	W 59–20	3,300	
December 7	1:00 pm	at No. 3 Western Illinois*	No. 15	Hanson Field; Macomb, IL (NCAA Division I-AA Quarterfinal)	W 31–28	3,300	
December 14	1:05 pm	at No. 2 Georgia Southern*	No. 15	Paulson Stadium; Statesboro, GA (NCAA Division I-AA Semifinal)	W 31–28	6,573	
December 20	5:30 pm	vs. No. 1 McNeese State*	No. 15	Finley Stadium; Chattanooga, TN (NCAA Division I-AA Championship Game)	W 34–14	12,360	
*Non-conference game; ^{†}Homecoming; Rankings from The Sports Network Poll released prior to the game; All times are in Central time

== Rankings ==
Ranking movements Legend: ██ Increase in ranking ██ Decrease in ranking RV = Received votes ( ) = First-place votes
	Week														
Poll	Pre	1	2	3	4	5	6	7	8	9	10	11	12	13	Final
The Sports Network	18	22	21	RV	25	RV	RV	RV	24	22	19	15	15	15	1 (41)

== Game summaries ==
=== At Kansas State ===
No. 18 Western Kentucky Hilltoppers at Kansas State Wildcats – Game summary

Quarter	1	2	3	4	Total
No. 18 Hilltoppers	0	0	0	3	3
Wildcats	3	31	7	7	48

at KSU Stadium, Manhattan, Kansas

- Date: August 31
- Game time: 6:10 p.m. CDT
- Game weather: Clear, 89 °F (32 °C)
- Game attendance: 45,844
- Referee: John Laurie
- Box score, Recap

Game information
First quarter
- KSU – Joe Rheem 36-yard field goal, 10:26. Wildcats 3–0. Drive: 11 plays, 61 yards, 4:34.

Second quarter

- KSU – Ayo Saba 2-yard run (Joe Rheem kick), 12:57. Wildcats 10–0. Drive: 14 plays, 80 yards, 5:57.
- KSU – Bobby Walker 73-yard interception return (Joe Rheem kick), 8:56. Wildcats 17–0.
- KSU – Danny Morris 7-yard run (Joe Rheem kick), 4:51. Wildcats 24–0. Drive: 3 plays, 62 yards, 1:01.
- KSU – Darren Sproles 9-yard run (Joe Rheem kick), 3:45. Wildcats 31–0. Drive: 1 play, 9 yards, 0:06.
- KSU – Joe Rheem 38-yard field goal, 0:00. Wildcats 34–0. Drive: 7 plays, 27 yards, 0:00.

Third quarter

- KSU – Ell Roberson 18-yard run (Joe Rheem kick), 3:47. Wildcats 41–0. Drive: 9 plays, 69 yards, 4:31.

Fourth quarter

- WKU – Peter Martinez 30-yard field goal, 7:18. Wildcats 41–3. Drive: 13 plays, 60 yards, 6:09.
- KSU – Ayo Saba 2-yard run (Jared Brite kick), 1:27. Wildcats 48–3. Drive: 14 plays, 89 yards, 5:51.

Statistics	WKU	KSU
First downs	12	23
Total yards	183	412
Rushing yards	110	240
Passing yards	73	172
Turnovers	2	0
Time of possession	31:55	27:14

Team	Category	Player	Statistics
Western Kentucky	Passing	Jason Michael	7/11, 73 yards, INT
Western Kentucky	Rushing	Maurice Bradley	19 rushes, 64 yards
Western Kentucky	Receiving	Casey Rooney	2 receptions, 28 yards
Kansas State	Passing	Ell Roberson	4/8, 108 yards
Kansas State	Rushing	Darren Sproles	19 rushes, 135 yards, TD
Kansas State	Receiving	Derrick Evans	3 receptions, 74 yards

=== Kentucky State ===
Kentucky State Thorobreds at No. 22 Western Kentucky Hilltoppers – Game summary

Quarter	1	2	3	4	Total
Thorobreds	0	0	0	0	0
No. 22 Hilltoppers	14	17	9	9	49

at L. T. Smith Stadium, Bowling Green, Kentucky

- Date: September 7
- Game time: 5:30 p.m. CDT
- Game attendance: 9,500

Statistics	KSU	WKU
First downs		
Total yards		
Rushing yards		
Passing yards		
Turnovers		
Time of possession		

Team	Category	Player	Statistics
Kentucky State	Passing		
Kentucky State	Rushing		
Kentucky State	Receiving		
Western Kentucky	Passing		
Western Kentucky	Rushing		
Western Kentucky	Receiving		

=== Western Illinois ===
Western Illinois Leathernecks at No. 21 Western Kentucky Hilltoppers – Game summary

Quarter	1	2	3	4	Total
Leathernecks	7	7	0	0	14
No. 21 Hilltoppers	0	0	0	0	0

at L. T. Smith Stadium, Bowling Green, Kentucky

- Date: September 14
- Game time: 1:30 p.m. CDT
- Game attendance: 6,000

Statistics	WIU	WKU
First downs		
Total yards		
Rushing yards		
Passing yards		
Turnovers		
Time of possession		

Team	Category	Player	Statistics
Western Illinois	Passing		
Western Illinois	Rushing		
Western Illinois	Receiving		
Western Kentucky	Passing		
Western Kentucky	Rushing		
Western Kentucky	Receiving		

=== No. 11 Youngstown State ===
No. 11 Youngstown State Penguins at Western Kentucky Hilltoppers – Game summary

Quarter	1	2	3	4	Total
No. 11 Penguins	0	7	0	0	7
Hilltoppers	3	7	3	0	13

at L. T. Smith Stadium, Bowling Green, Kentucky

- Date: September 21
- Game time: 5:30 p.m. CDT
- Game attendance: 10,100

Statistics	YSU	WKU
First downs		
Total yards		
Rushing yards		
Passing yards		
Turnovers		
Time of possession		

Team	Category	Player	Statistics
Youngstown State	Passing		
Youngstown State	Rushing		
Youngstown State	Receiving		
Western Kentucky	Passing		
Western Kentucky	Rushing		
Western Kentucky	Receiving		

=== At No. 2 McNeese State ===
No. 25 Western Kentucky Hilltoppers at No. 2 McNeese State Cowboys – Game summary

Quarter	1	2	3	4	Total
No. 25 Hilltoppers	0	10	3	0	13
No. 2 Cowboys	14	7	7	10	38

at Cowboy Stadium, Lake Charles, Louisiana

- Date: September 28
- Game time: 7:00 p.m. CDT
- Game attendance: 16,840

Statistics	WKU	MCN
First downs		
Total yards		
Rushing yards		
Passing yards		
Turnovers		
Time of possession		

Team	Category	Player	Statistics
Western Kentucky	Passing		
Western Kentucky	Rushing		
Western Kentucky	Receiving		
McNeese State	Passing		
McNeese State	Rushing		
McNeese State	Receiving		

=== At No. 6 Northern Iowa ===
Western Kentucky Hilltoppers at No. 6 Northern Iowa Panthers – Game summary

Quarter	1	2	3	4	Total
Hilltoppers	0	7	10	14	31
No. 6 Panthers	3	0	3	6	12

at UNI-Dome, Cedar Falls, Iowa

- Date: October 5
- Game time: 4:05 p.m. CDT
- Game attendance: 14,684

Statistics	WKU	UNI
First downs		
Total yards		
Rushing yards		
Passing yards		
Turnovers		
Time of possession		

Team	Category	Player	Statistics
Western Kentucky	Passing		
Western Kentucky	Rushing		
Western Kentucky	Receiving		
Northern Iowa	Passing		
Northern Iowa	Rushing		
Northern Iowa	Receiving		

=== FIU ===
FIU Panthers at Western Kentucky Hilltoppers – Game summary

Quarter	1	2	3	4	Total
Panthers	0	0	0	7	7
Hilltoppers	21	21	0	14	56

at L. T. Smith Stadium, Bowling Green, Kentucky

- Date: October 12
- Game time: 5:30 p.m. CDT
- Game weather: 77 °F (25 °C)
- Game attendance: 6,000
- Referee: Bill Etzler

Game information
First quarter
- WKU – Jason Michael 7-yard run (Peter Martinez kick), 9:53. Hilltoppers 7–0. Drive: 8 plays, 48 yards, 3:13.
- WKU – Jon Frazier 3-yard run (Peter Martinez kick), 7:10. Hilltoppers 14–0. Drive: 4 plays, 45 yards, 1:48.
- WKU – Jason Michael 8-yard run (Peter Martinez kick), 1:59. Hilltoppers 21–0. Drive: 6 plays, 42 yards, 2:58.

Second quarter

- WKU – Jerome Reaves 25-yard pass from Jason Michael (Peter Martinez kick), 10:53. Hilltoppers 28–0. Drive: 7 plays, 50 yards, 3:40.
- WKU – Jason Michael 1-yard run (Peter Martinez kick), 7:18. Hilltoppers 35–0. Drive: 7 plays, 49 yards, 3:21.
- WKU – Patrick Reynolds 1-yard fumble return (Peter Martinez kick), 5:42. Hilltoppers 42–0.

Third quarter

- No scoring plays

Fourth quarter

- WKU – Maurice Bradley 3-yard run (Wilson Wickerham kick), 13:45. Hilltoppers 49–0. Drive: 9 plays, 80 yards, 4:23.
- FIU – Cory McKinney 2-yard pass from David Tabor (Adam Moss kick), 11:02. Hilltoppers 49–7. Drive: 3 plays, 2 yards, 0:49.
- WKU – Alex Dukes 1-yard run (Matt Lange kick), 3:19. Hilltoppers 56–7. Drive: 13 plays, 69 yards, 7:43.

Statistics	FIU	WKU
First downs	7	28
Total yards	65	498
Rushing yards	-7	401
Passing yards	72	97
Turnovers	5	3
Time of possession	23:13	36:47

Team	Category	Player	Statistics
FIU	Passing	Jamie Burke	5/14, 75 yards, 4 INT
FIU	Rushing	Rashod Smith	6 rushes, 21 yards
FIU	Receiving	Harold Leath	2 receptions, 38 yards
Western Kentucky	Passing	Jason Michael	6/10, 97 yards, TD, INT
Western Kentucky	Rushing	Jon Frazier	15 rushes, 126 yards, TD
Western Kentucky	Receiving	Jeremi Johnson	2 receptions, 45 yards

=== At Southwest Missouri State ===
No. 24 Western Kentucky Hilltoppers at Southwest Missouri State Bears – Game summary

Quarter	1	2	3	4	Total
No. 24 Hilltoppers	7	7	10	7	31
Bears	7	0	0	0	7

at Plaster Sports Complex, Springfield, Missouri

- Date: October 19
- Game time: 1:30 p.m. CDT
- Game attendance: 13,002

Statistics	WKU	SMS
First downs		
Total yards		
Rushing yards		
Passing yards		
Turnovers		
Time of possession		

Team	Category	Player	Statistics
Western Kentucky	Passing		
Western Kentucky	Rushing		
Western Kentucky	Receiving		
Southwest Missouri State	Passing		
Southwest Missouri State	Rushing		
Southwest Missouri State	Receiving		

=== Indiana State ===
Indiana State Sycamores at No. 22 Western Kentucky Hilltoppers – Game summary

Quarter	1	2	3	4	Total
Sycamores	7	0	0	0	7
No. 22 Hilltoppers	10	14	0	0	24

at L. T. Smith Stadium, Bowling Green, Kentucky

- Date: October 26
- Game time: 4:30 p.m. CDT
- Game attendance: 11,200

Statistics	INS	WKU
First downs		
Total yards		
Rushing yards		
Passing yards		
Turnovers		
Time of possession		

Team	Category	Player	Statistics
Indiana State	Passing		
Indiana State	Rushing		
Indiana State	Receiving		
Western Kentucky	Passing		
Western Kentucky	Rushing		
Western Kentucky	Receiving		

=== Illinois State ===
Illinois State Redbirds at No. 19 Western Kentucky Hilltoppers – Game summary

Quarter	1	2	3	4	Total
Redbirds	0	0	0	0	0
No. 19 Hilltoppers	0	6	3	0	9

at L. T. Smith Stadium, Bowling Green, Kentucky

- Date: November 2
- Game time: 4:30 p.m. CST
- Game attendance: 5,600

Statistics	ILS	WKU
First downs		
Total yards		
Rushing yards		
Passing yards		
Turnovers		
Time of possession		

Team	Category	Player	Statistics
Illinois State	Passing		
Illinois State	Rushing		
Illinois State	Receiving		
Western Kentucky	Passing		
Western Kentucky	Rushing		
Western Kentucky	Receiving		

=== At Southern Illinois ===
No. 15 Western Kentucky Hilltoppers at Southern Illinois Salukis – Game summary

Quarter	1	2	3	4	Total
No. 15 Hilltoppers	7	13	14	14	48
Salukis	3	0	6	7	16

at Saluki Stadium, Carbondale, Illinois

- Date: November 16
- Game time: 1:30 p.m. CST
- Game attendance: 3,203

Statistics	WKU	SIU
First downs		
Total yards		
Rushing yards		
Passing yards		
Turnovers		
Time of possession		

Team	Category	Player	Statistics
Western Kentucky	Passing		
Western Kentucky	Rushing		
Western Kentucky	Receiving		
Southern Illinois	Passing		
Southern Illinois	Rushing		
Southern Illinois	Receiving		

=== No. 23 Murray State (NCAA Division I-AA First Round) ===
No. 23 Murray State Racers at No. 15 Western Kentucky Hilltoppers (NCAA Division I-AA First Round) – Game summary

Quarter	1	2	3	4	Total
No. 23 Racers	0	14	0	6	20
No. 15 Hilltoppers	24	14	7	14	59

at L. T. Smith Stadium, Bowling Green, Kentucky

- Date: November 30
- Game time: 1:00 p.m. CST
- Game attendance: 3,300

Statistics	MUR	WKU
First downs		
Total yards		
Rushing yards		
Passing yards		
Turnovers		
Time of possession		

Team	Category	Player	Statistics
Murray State	Passing		
Murray State	Rushing		
Murray State	Receiving		
Western Kentucky	Passing		
Western Kentucky	Rushing		
Western Kentucky	Receiving		

=== At No. 3 Western Illinois (NCAA Division I-AA Quarterfinal) ===
No. 15 Western Kentucky Hilltoppers at No. 3 Western Illinois (NCAA Division I-AA Quarterfinal) – Game summary

Quarter	1	2	3	4	Total
No. 15 Hilltoppers	0	7	7	17	31
No. 3 Leathernecks	0	14	7	7	28

at Hanson Field, Macomb, Illinois

- Date: December 7
- Game time: 1:00 p.m. CST
- Game attendance: 3,300

Statistics	WKU	WIU
First downs		
Total yards		
Rushing yards		
Passing yards		
Turnovers		
Time of possession		

Team	Category	Player	Statistics
Western Kentucky	Passing		
Western Kentucky	Rushing		
Western Kentucky	Receiving		
Western Illinois	Passing		
Western Illinois	Rushing		
Western Illinois	Receiving		

=== At No. 2 Georgia Southern (NCAA Division I-AA Semifinal) ===
No. 15 Western Kentucky Hilltoppers at No. 2 Georgia Southern Eagles (NCAA Division I-AA Semifinal) – Game summary

Quarter	1	2	3	4	Total
No. 15 Hilltoppers	7	10	7	7	31
No. 2 Eagles	7	0	0	21	28

at Paulson Stadium, Statesboro, Georgia

- Date: December 14
- Game time: 1:05 p.m. CST/2:05 p.m. EST
- Game attendance: 6,573

Statistics	WKU	GSO
First downs		
Total yards		
Rushing yards		
Passing yards		
Turnovers		
Time of possession		

Team	Category	Player	Statistics
Western Kentucky	Passing		
Western Kentucky	Rushing		
Western Kentucky	Receiving		
Georgia Southern	Passing		
Georgia Southern	Rushing		
Georgia Southern	Receiving		

=== Vs No. 1 McNeese State (NCAA Division I-AA Championship Game) ===
No. 15 Western Kentucky Hilltoppers vs. No. 1 McNeese State Cowboys (NCAA Division I-AA Championship Game) – Game summary

Quarter	1	2	3	4	Total
No. 15 Hilltoppers	7	10	7	10	34
No. 1 Cowboys	0	6	8	0	14

at Finley Stadium, Chattanooga, Tennessee

- Date: December 20
- Game time: 5:30 p.m. CST
- Game weather: Partly cloudy, 48 °F (9 °C)
- Game attendance: 12,360
- Referee: A. Bellows
- TV announcers (ESPN2): Ron Franklin, Mike Gottfried, and Adrian Karsten
- Box score, Recap

Game information
First quarter
- WKU – Jeremi Johnson 16-yard pass from Jason Michael (Peter Martinez kick), 9:36. Hilltoppers 7–0. Drive: 5 plays, 27 yards, 3:01.

Second quarter

- WKU – Jon Frazier 55-yard run (Peter Martinez kick), 14:51. Hilltoppers 14–0. Drive: 4 plays, 88 yards, 1:53.
- MCN – John Marino 30-yard field goal, 7:32. Hilltoppers 14–3. Drive: 10 plays, 56 yards, 4:37.
- WKU – Peter Martinez 40-yard field goal, 4:55. Hilltoppers 17–3. Drive: 6 plays, 43 yards, 2:37.
- MCN – John Marino 24-yard field goal, 0:07. Hilltoppers 17–6. Drive: 7 plays, 19 yards, 0:48.

Third quarter

- WKU – Jon Frazier 14-yard run (Peter Martinez kick), 11:03. Hilltoppers 24–6. Drive: 4 plays, 71 yards, 1:05.
- MCN – Luke Lawton 15-yard pass from Scott Pendarvis (Scott Pendarvis pass to Jeff Hamilton), 3:49. Hilltoppers 24–14. Drive: 8 plays, 75 yards, 2:13.

Fourth quarter

- WKU – Jason Michael 2-yard run (Peter Martinez kick), 13:49. Hilltoppers 31–14. Drive: 10 plays, 79 yards, 5:00.
- WKU – Peter Martinez 23-yard field goal, 2:51. Hilltoppers 34–14. Drive: 4 plays, 2 yards, 1:36.

Statistics	WKU	MCN
First downs	13	26
Total yards	380	405
Rushing yards	195	137
Passing yards	185	268
Turnovers	1	3
Time of possession	30:18	29:42

Team	Category	Player	Statistics
Western Kentucky	Passing	Jason Michael	6/10, 185 yards, TD
Western Kentucky	Rushing	Jon Frazier	27 rushes, 159 yards, 2 TD
Western Kentucky	Receiving	Jeremi Johnson	3 receptions, 90 yards, TD
McNeese State	Passing	Scott Pendarvis	21/38, 244 yards, TD, INT
McNeese State	Rushing	Marcus Trahan	12 rushes, 82 yards
McNeese State	Receiving	B. J. Sams	7 receptions, 69 yards
