= 1963 Western Kentucky Hilltoppers football team =

American college football season

1963 Western Kentucky Hilltoppers football

OVC champion Tangerine Bowl champion

Tangerine Bowl, W 27–0 vs. Coast Guard
- Conference: Ohio Valley Conference

Ranking
- Coaches: No. 8
- Record: 10–0–1 (7–0 OVC)
- Head coach: Nick Denes (7th season)
- Captains: Joe Bugel; Harold Chambers

1963 Ohio Valley Conference football standings
	Conf.					Overall
Team	W		L		T	W		L		T
No. 8 Western Kentucky $	7	–	0	–	0	10	–	0	–	1
Middle Tennessee	6	–	1	–	0	8	–	2	–	0
East Tennessee State	5	–	2	–	0	7	–	2	–	0
Tennessee Tech	3	–	4	–	0	6	–	4	–	0
Murray State	3	–	4	–	0	5	–	5	–	0
Morehead State	3	–	4	–	0	5	–	4	–	0
Eastern Kentucky	1	–	6	–	0	2	–	8	–	0
Austin Peay	0	–	7	–	0	1	–	9	–	0
$ – Conference champion; Rankings from UPI small college poll

The 1963 Western Kentucky football team represented Western Kentucky State College (now known as Western Kentucky University) during the 1963 NCAA College Division football season. The Hilltoppers were led by OVC Coach of the Year Nick Denes, won the Ohio Valley Conference championship, and finished the season undefeated. This team was one of the finest in school history and set a school record for victories. The roster included future National Football League (NFL) players John Mutchler, Dale Lindsey, Jim Burt, and Harold Chambers as well as future NFL coach Joe Bugel. Mutchler was named OVC Defensive Player of the Year.

The Hilltoppers earned a berth in the Tangerine Bowl, where they defeated the Coast Guard Academy 27–0. Western Kentucky quarterback Sharon Miller was named the game's most valuable player. Mutchler, Chambers, Bugel, Jim Burt, Lindsey, and Bobby Westmoreland were named to the All-OVC team, while John Burt, Eddie Crum, Bob Gebhart, Sharon Miller, and Stan Napper were Honorable Mention.

== Schedule ==
Date	Opponent	Rank	Site	Result	Attendance	Source
September 14	at Southeast Missouri State*		Cape Girardeau, MO	W 40–7	4,500	
September 21	at Tampa*		Phillips Field; Tampa, FL	T 14–14	6,500	
September 28	East Tennessee State		Bowling Green, KY	W 14–6	4,500	
October 5	at Middle Tennessee		Horace Jones Field; Murfreesboro, TN	W 16–6	8,500	
October 12	at Austin Peay	No. 17	Municipal Stadium; Clarksville, TN	W 34–14	4,200	
October 19	at No. 11 Tennessee Tech	No. 10	Cookeville, TN	W 14–12	8,500	
October 26	Evansville*^{†}	No. 9	Bowling Green, KY	W 54–14	9,000	
November 2	at Eastern Kentucky	No. 8	Richmond, KY (Battle of the Bluegrass)	W 29–6	8,000	
November 9	Morehead State	No. 7	Bowling Green, KY	W 17–0	6,000	
November 23	Murray State	No. 9	Bowling Green, KY	W 50–0	7,000	
December 28	vs. Coast Guard	No. 8	Tangerine Bowl; Orlando, FL (Tangerine Bowl)	W 27–0		
*Non-conference game; ^{†}Homecoming; Rankings from UPI Poll released prior to the game
