= Joe Pannunzio =

American football coach (born 1959)

Philadelphia Eagles
- Title: Assistant special teams coach

Personal information
- Born: July 4, 1959 (age 67); Pueblo, Colorado, U.S.

Career information
- Position: Quarterback
- College: Southern Colorado

Career history

Coaching
- Southern Colorado (1981) Wide receivers coach; Mesa (CO) (1982–1984) Quarterbacks & wide receivers coach; Kansas State (1985–1986) Tight ends coach; Mesa (CO) (1987–1990) Offensive coordinator; TCU (1990–1991) Offensive line/tight ends/special teams coach; Minnesota (1992–1994) Tight ends coach & special teams; Ole Miss (1995–1998) Tight ends coach & special teams; Auburn (1999) Tight ends coach & special teams; Murray State (2000–2005) Head coach; Miami (FL) (2006–2010) Tight ends coach & special teams coordinator; Alabama (2017) Tight ends coach & special teams coordinator; Alabama (2018) Running backs coach; Philadelphia Eagles (2021–present) Assistant special teams coach

Operations
- Alabama (2011–2014) Director of football operations; Philadelphia Eagles (2015–2016) Director of personnel operations; Philadelphia Eagles (2019–2020) Director of team development

Awards and highlights
- As head coach: OVC championship (2002); As assistant: Super Bowl champion (LIX); CFP national champion (2017); As administrator: 2× BCS national champion (2011, 2012)

Head coaching record
- Career: 30–37 (.448) (College)

Joseph Thomas Pannunzio (born July 4, 1959) is an American football coach for the Philadelphia Eagles. He is a former player and executive. He served as head football coach at Murray State University (MSU) from 2000 to 2005, compiling an overall record of 30–37. Pannunzio was the director of football operations at the University of Alabama from 2011 to 2014. He was the special teams/tight ends coach in 2017, and running backs coach in 2018 for the University of Alabama. He is currently the assistant special teams coordinator for the Philadelphia Eagles of the National Football League (NFL).

== Coaching career ==
=== Murray State ===
In November 2002, Murray State won a share of the Ohio Valley Conference championship with a 37–35 win over an Eastern Illinois squad led by future NFL quarterback Tony Romo. Kicker Shane Andrus made the 52-yard game-winning field goal as time expired. The Racers finished the season 7–4 and 5–1 in conference, and MSU received the OVC's automatic bid to the Division I-AA playoffs. In the first round of the NCAA Division I playoffs, the Racers faced off against the arch rival Western Kentucky on the road in Bowling Green, Kentucky. The Hilltoppers won the rivalry game 59–20 and went on to win the Division I-AA national championship.

On April 29, 2005, Pannunzio was placed on paid administrative leave following the arrest of a Murray State football player and a former player on drug trafficking and weapons charges. Ron Lane, a junior running back, and Terrence Biggers, a former wide receiver, were charged with trafficking in a controlled substance within 1,000 yards of a school and possession of drug paraphernalia. Following the incident, athletic director Allen Ward stated, "charges of this severity and magnitude demand stepped-up review of our football program." Ron Lane was removed from the team and both students were banned from campus.

Murray State finished the 2005 season with a winless conference record of 0–7 and an overall record of 2–9. In November 2005, Pannunzio was notified that his contract would not be renewed. According to an interview several years later with former Murray State president F. King Alexander, Alexander explained Pannunzio's departure by stating, "I fired our football coach, Joe Pannunzio, because of numerous incidents that occurred in our program under him that were quite bad." Murray State's overall record under Pannunzio was 30–37 (.448), which left him as one of five Racer football coaches with overall losing records.

=== Philadelphia Eagles ===
Since 2021, Pannunzio has been part of the Philadelphia Eagles' coaching staff as assistant special teams coach. He was part of the staff that won Super Bowl LIX over the Kansas City Chiefs.

== Head coaching record ==
Year	Team	Overall	Conference	Standing	Bowl/playoffs
Murray State Racers (Ohio Valley Conference) (2000–2005)
2000	Murray State	6–5	4–3	4th	
2001	Murray State	4–6	2–4	5th	
2002	Murray State	7–5	5–1	T–1st	L NCAA Division I–AA First Round
2003	Murray State	4–8	3–5	T–6th	
2004	Murray State	7–4	6–2	T–2nd	
2005	Murray State	2–9	0–7	9th	
Murray State:		30–37	20–22		
Total:		30–37			
National championship Conference title Conference division title or championship game berth
