= 1963 East Tennessee State Buccaneers football team =

American college football season

1963 East Tennessee State Buccaneers football
- Conference: Ohio Valley Conference
- Record: 7–2 (5–2 OVC)
- Head coach: Star Wood (11th season)
- Home stadium: University Stadium

1963 Ohio Valley Conference football standings
	Conf.					Overall
Team	W		L		T	W		L		T
No. 8 Western Kentucky $	7	–	0	–	0	10	–	0	–	1
Middle Tennessee	6	–	1	–	0	8	–	2	–	0
East Tennessee State	5	–	2	–	0	7	–	2	–	0
Tennessee Tech	3	–	4	–	0	6	–	4	–	0
Murray State	3	–	4	–	0	5	–	5	–	0
Morehead State	3	–	4	–	0	5	–	4	–	0
Eastern Kentucky	1	–	6	–	0	2	–	8	–	0
Austin Peay	0	–	7	–	0	1	–	9	–	0
$ – Conference champion; Rankings from UPI small college poll

The 1963 East Tennessee State Buccaneers football team represented East Tennessee State University as a member of the Ohio Valley Conference (OVC) during the 1963 NCAA College Division football season. Led by 11th-year head coach Star Wood, the Buccaneers compiled an overall record of 7–2, with a mark of 5–2 in conference play, and finished third in the OVC.

The Buccaneers game against Appalachian State scheduled for November 23 at University Stadium was canceled in deference to the assassination of John F. Kennedy which occurred the previous day at Dallas.

== Schedule ==
Date	Opponent	Site	Result	Attendance	Source
September 21	Murray State	University Stadium; Johnson City, TN	W 21–14	6,200	
September 28	at Western Kentucky	Bowling Green, KY	L 6–14	7,000	
October 5	at Chattanooga*	Chamberlain Field; Chattanooga, TN	W 27–22	7,000	
October 12	Tennessee Tech	University Stadium; Johnson City, TN	W 16–0	7,200	
October 19	Eastern Kentucky	University Stadium; Johnson City, TN	W 35–12	8,000	
October 26	at Wofford*	Synder Field; Spartanburg, SC	W 32–20	5,500	
November 2	at Morehead State	Jayne Memorial Stadium; Morehead, KY	W 22–9	3,500	
November 9	Austin Peay	University Stadium; Johnson City, TN	W 8–7	6,300	
November 16	at Middle Tennessee	Horace Jones Field; Murfreesboro, TN	L 0–23	8,000	
November 23	Appalachian State*	University Stadium; Johnson City, TN	Canceled		
*Non-conference game; Source:
