= 2002 Western Illinois Leathernecks football team =

American college football season

2002 Western Illinois Leathernecks football

Gateway co-champion

NCAA Division I-AA Quarterfinal, L 28–31 vs. Western Kentucky
- Conference: Gateway Football Conference

Ranking
- Sports Network: No. 5
- Record: 11–2 (6–1 Gateway)
- Head coach: Don Patterson (4th season)
- Offensive coordinator: Mark Hendrickson (4th season)
- Home stadium: Hanson Field

2002 Gateway Football Conference standings
	Conf.			Overall
Team	W		L	W		L
No. 1 Western Kentucky +^	6	–	1	12	–	3
No. 5 Western Illinois +^	6	–	1	11	–	2
Youngstown State	4	–	3	7	–	4
Illinois State	4	–	3	6	–	5
Indiana State	3	–	4	5	–	7
Northern Iowa	2	–	5	5	–	6
Southern Illinois	2	–	5	4	–	8
Southwest Missouri State	1	–	6	4	–	7
+ – Conference co-champions; ^ – NCAA Division I-AA playoff participant; Rankings from The Sports Network poll

The 2002 Western Illinois Leathernecks football team represented Western Illinois University as a member of the Gateway Football Conference during the 2002 NCAA Division I-AA football season. They were led by fourth-year head coach Don Patterson and played their home games at Hanson Field. The Leathernecks finished the season with an 11–2 record overall and a 6–1 record in conference play, making them conference co-champions. The team received an automatic bid to the NCAA Division I-AA Football Championship playoffs, where they defeated Eastern Illinois in the first round and lost to Western Kentucky in the quarterfinal. The team was ranked No. 5 in The Sports Network's postseason ranking of Division I-AA.

== Schedule ==
Date	Opponent	Rank	Site	Result	Attendance	Source
August 29	Drake*		Hanson Field; Macomb, IL	W 64–7	10,830	
September 14	at No. 21 Western Kentucky		Houchens Industries–L. T. Smith Stadium; Bowling Green, KY	W 14–0	6,000	
September 21	at Northern Illinois*	No. 20	Huskie Stadium; DeKalb, IL	W 29–26	23,598	
September 28	Sam Houston State*	No. 12	Hanson Field; Macomb, IL	W 41–13	15,318	
October 5	at Southern Illinois	No. 8	McAndrew Stadium; Carbondale, IL	L 52–54	10,283	
October 12	Illinois State	No. 13	Hanson Field; Macomb, IL	W 22–17	10,113	
October 19	Indiana State	No. 10	Hanson Field; Macomb, IL	W 52–21	8,562	
October 26	No. 23 Youngstown State	No. 9	Hanson Field; Macomb, IL	W 19–0	14,186	
November 2	at Southwest Missouri State	No. 8	Robert W. Plaster Stadium; Springfield, MO	W 28–23	1,885	
November 9	at Northern Iowa	No. 8	UNI-Dome; Cedar Falls, IA	W 35–12	9,443	
November 16	at Southern Utah*	No. 5	Eccles Coliseum; Cedar City, UT	W 38–28	1,913	
November 30	No. 10 Eastern Illinois*	No. 3	Hanson Field; Macomb, IL (NCAA Division I-AA First Round)	W 48–9	2,429	
December 6	No. 15 Western Kentucky	No. 3	Hanson Field; Macomb, IL (NCAA Division I-AA Quarterfinal)	L 28–31		
*Non-conference game; Rankings from The Sports Network Poll released prior to the game
