= 1958 Middle Tennessee Blue Raiders football team =

American college football season

1958 Middle Tennessee Blue Raiders football

OVC co-champion
- Conference: Ohio Valley Conference

Ranking
- Coaches: No. 11
- Record: 8–2 (5–1 OVC)
- Head coach: Charles M. Murphy (12th season)
- Captains: Harold Greer; Roy Hall
- Home stadium: Horace Jones Field

1958 Ohio Valley Conference football standings
	Conf.					Overall
Team	W		L		T	W		L		T
No. 11 Middle Tennessee +	5	–	1	–	0	8	–	2	–	0
Tennessee Tech +	5	–	1	–	0	7	–	3	–	0
East Tennessee State	4	–	2	–	0	5	–	4	–	0
Eastern Kentucky	3	–	3	–	0	3	–	6	–	0
Western Kentucky	2	–	4	–	0	4	–	5	–	0
Murray State	2	–	4	–	0	3	–	7	–	0
Morehead State	0	–	6	–	0	0	–	8	–	1
+ – Conference co-champions; Rankings from UPI small college poll

The 1958 Middle Tennessee Blue Raiders football team represented the Middle Tennessee State College—now known as Middle Tennessee State University—as a member of the Ohio Valley Conference (OVC) during the 1958 college football season. Led by 12th-year head coach Charles M. Murphy, the Blue Raiders compiled a record an overall record of 8–2 with a mark of 5–1 in conference play, sharing the OVC title with Tennessee Tech. The team's captains were Harold Greer and Roy Hall.

== Schedule ==
Date	Opponent	Rank	Site	Result	Attendance	Source
September 20	Austin Peay*		Horace Jones Field; Murfreesboro, TN	W 12–0		
September 27	at Jacksonville State*	No. T–8	College Bowl; Jacksonville, AL	W 18–6		
October 4	at Western Kentucky	No. 12	Bowling Green, KY (rivalry)	W 10–7	5,319	
October 10	at Eastern Kentucky	No. 16	Richmond, KY	W 14–0		
October 17	at No. 3 Chattanooga*	No. 11	Chamberlain Field; Chattanooga, TN	L 7–18	10,000	
October 25	Morehead State	No. 20	Horace Jones Field; Murfreesboro, TN	W 34–6		
November 1	Florence State*		Horace Jones Field; Murfreesboro, TN	W 34–6		
November 8	Murray State		Horace Jones Field; Murfreesboro, TN	W 40–0		
November 15	at East Tennessee State	No. 15	State College Stadium; Johnson City, TN	W 27–20		
November 27	at Tennessee Tech	No. 13	Overhill Field; Cookeville, TN	L 0–14		
*Non-conference game; Rankings from UPI Poll released prior to the game
