= 2002 Illinois State Redbirds football team =

American college football season

2002 Illinois State Redbirds football
- Conference: Gateway Football Conference
- Record: 6–5 (4–3 Gateway)
- Head coach: Denver Johnson (3rd season)
- MVPs: Boomer Grigsby; Mike Souza
- Captains: Vito Golson; Boomer Grigsby; Jon Laurenti; Ray Robinson
- Home stadium: Hancock Stadium

2002 Gateway Football Conference standings
	Conf.			Overall
Team	W		L	W		L
No. 1 Western Kentucky +^	6	–	1	12	–	3
No. 5 Western Illinois +^	6	–	1	11	–	2
Youngstown State	4	–	3	7	–	4
Illinois State	4	–	3	6	–	5
Indiana State	3	–	4	5	–	7
Northern Iowa	2	–	5	5	–	6
Southern Illinois	2	–	5	4	–	8
Southwest Missouri State	1	–	6	4	–	7
+ – Conference co-champions; ^ – NCAA Division I-AA playoff participant; Rankings from The Sports Network poll

The 2002 Illinois State Redbirds football team represented Illinois State University as a member of the Gateway Football Conference during the 2002 NCAA Division I-AA football season. The team was led by third-year head coach Denver Johnson and played their home games at Hancock Stadium in Normal, Illinois. The Redbirds finished the season with an overall record of 6–5 and a record of 4–3 in conference play, tying for third place in the Gateway.

== Schedule ==
Date	Opponent	Rank	Site	Result	Attendance	Source
August 31	at Purdue*		Ross–Ade Stadium; West Lafayette, IN	L 10–51	47,701	
September 7	Quincy (IL)*		Hancock Stadium; Normal, IL	W 55–10	8,234	
September 21	Murray State*		Hancock Stadium; Normal, IL	W 24–23	7,674	
September 28	at No. 13 Eastern Illinois*		O'Brien Stadium; Charleston, IL (rivalry)	L 10–45	10,731	
October 5	Southwest Missouri State^{†}		Hancock Stadium; Normal, IL	W 30–20	10,283	
October 12	at No. 13 Western Illinois		Hanson Field; Macomb, IL	L 17–22	10,113	
October 19	No. 25 Southern Illinois		Hancock Stadium; Normal, IL	W 35–14	12,415	
October 26	at No. 17 Northern Iowa		UNI-Dome; Cedar Falls, IA	W 31–20	9,241	
November 2	at No. 22 Western Kentucky	No. 25	L. T. Smith Stadium; Bowling Green, KY	L 0–9	5,600	
November 9	Youngstown State		Hancock Stadium; Normal, IL	L 17–24	6,458	
November 16	at Indiana State		Memorial Stadium; Terre Haute, IN	W 20–12	2,652	
*Non-conference game; ^{†}Homecoming; Rankings from The Sports Network Poll released prior to the game
