= 2002 Southwest Missouri State Bears football team =

American college football season

2002 Southwest Missouri State Bears football
- Conference: Gateway Football Conference
- Record: 4–7 (1–6 GFC)
- Head coach: Randy Ball (4th season)
- Offensive coordinator: Courtney Messingham (3rd season)
- Defensive coordinator: Deion Melvin (4th season)
- Captains: Crockett Ladd; Jeff Bristol; Daryl Warren; Colin Johnson
- Home stadium: Plaster Sports Complex

2002 Gateway Football Conference standings
	Conf.			Overall
Team	W		L	W		L
No. 1 Western Kentucky +^	6	–	1	12	–	3
No. 5 Western Illinois +^	6	–	1	11	–	2
Youngstown State	4	–	3	7	–	4
Illinois State	4	–	3	6	–	5
Indiana State	3	–	4	5	–	7
Northern Iowa	2	–	5	5	–	6
Southern Illinois	2	–	5	4	–	8
Southwest Missouri State	1	–	6	4	–	7
+ – Conference co-champions; ^ – NCAA Division I-AA playoff participant; Rankings from The Sports Network poll

The 2002 Southwest Missouri State Bears football team represented Southwest Missouri State University (now known as Missouri State University) as a member of the Gateway Football Conference (GFC) during the 2002 NCAA Division I-AA football season. Led by fourth-year head coach Randy Ball, the Bears compiled an overall record of 4–7, with a mark of 1–6 in conference play, and finished eighth in the GFC.

== Schedule ==
Date	Opponent	Site	Result	Attendance	Source
August 29	East Central*	Plaster Sports Complex; Springfield, MO	W 26–14	11,254	
September 7	at No. 25 Hampton*	Armstrong Stadium; Hampton, VA	W 28–26	4,207	
September 14	at Kansas*	Memorial Stadium; Lawrence, KS	L 24–44	40,500	
September 21	Southeast Missouri State*	Plaster Sports Complex; Springfield, MO	W 28–21	12,575	
September 28	No. 21 Youngstown State	Plaster Sports Complex; Springfield, MO	L 17–24	12,599	
October 5	at Illinois State	Hancock Stadium; Normal, IL	L 20–30	10,283	
October 12	at Indiana State	Memorial Stadium; Terre Haute, IN	L 20–23 ^{OT}		
October 19	No. 24 Western Kentucky	Plaster Sports Complex; Springfield, MO	L 7–31	13,002	
October 26	Southern Illinois	Plaster Sports Complex; Springfield, MO	W 38–28	3,283	
November 2	No. 8 Western Illinois	Plaster Sports Complex; Springfield, MO	L 23–28	1,885	
November 16	at Northern Iowa	UNI-Dome; Cedar Falls, IA	L 24–25		
*Non-conference game; Rankings from The Sports Network Poll released prior to the game
