= Tim McGuire =

American football player and coach (born 1953)

Biographical details
- Born: September 3, 1953 (age 73); Omaha, Nebraska, U.S.
- Education: University of Nebraska–Omaha

Playing career
- 1972–1974: Nebraska
- Position: Offensive guard

Coaching career (HC unless noted)
- 1975–1976: Archbishop Ryan HS (NE)
- 1977: Millard (NE) (assistant)
- 1978–1980: Nebraska–Omaha (GA)
- 1981–1982: Morningside
- 1983: Indiana State (DC)
- 1984–1985: Kansas State (LB)
- 1986–1990: Northern Illinois (DC)
- 1991: Navy (ILB)
- 1992: Navy (sprint DC)
- 1993–1997: Indiana State (DC)
- 1998–2004: Indiana State
- 2005: St. Norbert (DC)
- 2006–2010: Southeast Missouri State (DC)
- 2011–2013: Southeast Missouri State (OC/assoc. HC)
- 2014: Glenville State (DB)
- 2015: Culver–Stockton (DC/LB)

Head coaching record
- Overall: 31–70 (college)

Timothy M. McGuire (born September 3, 1953) is an American football coach. He served as the head coach at Morningside College from 1981 to 1982 and at Indiana State University from 1998 to 2004.

== Early life and college playing career ==
McGuire was born in Omaha, Nebraska. McGuire graduated from Creighton Preparatory School in 1971. From the 1971 to 1974 seasons, McGuire was an offensive guard for the Nebraska Cornhuskers football team at the University of Nebraska–Lincoln. On Nebraska's varsity team, McGuire played under coach Bob Devaney in 1972 and under Tom Osborne in 1973 and 1974. McGuire was also part of Nebraska teams that won the 1973 Orange Bowl, 1974 Cotton Bowl Classic (for the 1973 season), and 1974 Sugar Bowl (for the 1974 season). McGuire earned his bachelor's degree in mathematics from the College of Arts and Sciences at Nebraska–Lincoln in 1975.

== Coaching career ==
After graduating from Nebraska–Lincoln, McGuire returned to Omaha in 1975 to become a math teacher and head football coach at Archbishop Ryan High School. McGuire took the job after learning that the previous coach at Ryan resigned one week before the season began. In 1977, McGuire became an assistant coach and also a math teacher at Millard High School. From 1978 to 1980, McGuire was a defensive graduate assistant at the University of Nebraska–Omaha for the Nebraska–Omaha Mavericks football team and graduated from Nebraska–Omaha with a master's in physical education.

From 1981 to 1982, McGuire was the head football coach Morningside College in Sioux City, Iowa. His coaching record at Morningside was 7–15.

After leaving Morningside, McGuire was defensive coordinator at Indiana State in 1983. From 1984 to 1985, McGuire was linebackers coach at Kansas State. From 1986 to 1990, McGuire was defensive coordinator at Northern Illinois. In 1991, he was inside linebackers coach at Navy under George Chaump. In 1992, McGuire became defensive coordinator for Navy's sprint football team that went 7–0 and made the East Lightweight Football Championship.

McGuire returned to Indiana State in 1993 to join the staff of Dennis Raetz as defensive coordinator and served in that position for five seasons. In 1998, McGuire succeeded Raetz as head coach and was head coach until 2004. In 2005, McGuire was defensive coordinator at Division III St. Norbert. Then in 2006, McGuire joined Tony Samuel's staff at Southeast Missouri State as defensive coordinator. Following the 2010 season in which Southeast Missouri State finished 9–3 and made the playoffs, McGuire was promoted to assistant head coach and offensive coordinator. McGuire left Southeast Missouri State after the 2013 season, after Samuel was fired.

In 2014, McGuire joined David Hutchison's staff at the Division II Glenville State as defensive backs coach.

== Head coaching record ==
Year	Team	Overall	Conference	Standing	Bowl/playoffs
Morningside Chiefs (North Central Conference) (1981–1982)
1981	Morningside	5–6	2–5	T–6th	
1982	Morningside	2–9	0–7	8th	
Morningside:		7–15	2–12		
Indiana State Sycamores (Gateway Football Conference) (1998–2004)
1998	Indiana State	5–6	2–4	6th	
1999	Indiana State	3–8	2–4	6th	
2000	Indiana State	1–10	1–5	7th	
2001	Indiana State	3–8	2–5	6th	
2002	Indiana State	5–7	3–4	5th	
2003	Indiana State	3–9	0–7	8th	
2004	Indiana State	4–7	1–6	8th	
Indiana State:		24–55	11–35		
Total:		31–70			
