= 1963 Middle Tennessee Blue Raiders football team =

American college football season

1963 Middle Tennessee Blue Raiders football
- Conference: Ohio Valley Conference
- Record: 8–2 (6–1 OVC)
- Head coach: Charles M. Murphy (17th season)
- Captains: Jackie Pope; Calvin Short
- Home stadium: Horace Jones Field

1963 Ohio Valley Conference football standings
	Conf.					Overall
Team	W		L		T	W		L		T
No. 8 Western Kentucky $	7	–	0	–	0	10	–	0	–	1
Middle Tennessee	6	–	1	–	0	8	–	2	–	0
East Tennessee State	5	–	2	–	0	7	–	2	–	0
Tennessee Tech	3	–	4	–	0	6	–	4	–	0
Murray State	3	–	4	–	0	5	–	5	–	0
Morehead State	3	–	4	–	0	5	–	4	–	0
Eastern Kentucky	1	–	6	–	0	2	–	8	–	0
Austin Peay	0	–	7	–	0	1	–	9	–	0
$ – Conference champion; Rankings from UPI small college poll

The 1963 Middle Tennessee Blue Raiders football team represented the Middle Tennessee State College—now known as Middle Tennessee State University—as a member of the Ohio Valley Conference (OVC) during the 1963 NCAA College Division football season. Led by 17th-year head coach Charles M. Murphy, the Blue Raiders compiled a record an overall record of 8–2 with a mark of 6–1 in conference play, placing second in the OVC. The team's captains were Jackie Pope and Calvin Shorts.

== Schedule ==
Date	Opponent	Site	Result	Attendance	Source
September 21	at Florence State*	Florence, AL	W 41–13	4,000	
September 28	Tennessee–Martin*	Horace Jones Field; Murfreesboro, TN	W 21–14	3,000	
October 5	Western Kentucky	Horace Jones Field; Murfreesboro, TN (rivalry)	L 6–16	7,000–8,500	
October 12	at Eastern Kentucky	Richmond, KY	W 33–28	8,000	
October 19	Chattanooga*	Horace Jones Field; Murfreesboro, TN	L 0–7	7,000	
October 26	at Morehead State	Morehead, KY	W 27–7	6,000	
November 2	at Austin Peay	Clarksville Municipal Stadium; Clarksville, TN	W 27–0	5,000	
November 9	at Murray State	Cutchin Stadium; Murray, KY	W 14–7	8,500	
November 16	East Tennessee State	Horace Jones Field; Murfreesboro, TN	W 23–0	8,000	
November 28	Tennessee Tech	Horace Jones Field; Murfreesboro, TN	W 21–14	9,000	
*Non-conference game
