= 1963 Tangerine Bowl =

American college football game

Western Kentucky Hilltoppers	Coast Guard Bears
(9–0–1)	(8–0)
Ohio Valley Conference	Independent
27	0
Head coach: Nick Denes	Head coach: Otto Graham
	1	2	3	4	Total
Western Kentucky	0	14	6	7	27
Coast Guard	0	0	0	0	0
- Date: December 28, 1963
- Season: 1963
- Stadium: Tangerine Bowl
- Location: Orlando, Florida
- MVP: Sharon Miller
- Attendance: 7,500

The 1963 Tangerine Bowl was an NCAA College Division game following the 1963 season, between the Western Kentucky Hilltoppers and the Coast Guard Bears. Western Kentucky quarterback Sharon Miller was named the game's most valuable player.

== Notable participants ==
Western Kentucky linebacker Dale Lindsey and running back Jim Burt were selected in the 1965 NFL draft. Lindsey has subsequently coached at both the college and professional levels, and in December 2012 became the head coach of the San Diego Toreros. Lindsey, Burt, and head coach Nick Denes are inductees of the university's athletic hall of fame.

Coast Guard head coach Otto Graham is an inductee of the College Football Hall of Fame and the Pro Football Hall of Fame.

== Scoring summary ==
Scoring summary

Quarter	Time	Drive			Team	Scoring information	Score	
Quarter	Time	Plays	Yards	TOP	Team	Scoring information	WK	CG
2	7:23	6	32		WK	Sharon Miller 12-yard touchdown run, Sam Clark kick good	7	0
2	5:00				WK	John Mutchler 20-yard touchdown reception from Sharon Miller, Sam Clark kick good	14	0
3		3	67		WK	Stan Napper 57-yard touchdown reception from Sharon Miller, Sam Clark kick blocked by Roger Roberts	20	0
4	13:59	1	14		WK	Jim Burt 14-yard touchdown run, Sam Clark kick good	27	0
"TOP" = time of possession. For other American football terms, see Glossary of American football.							27	0

== Statistics ==
Program cover for 1963 game

Statistics	Western Kentucky	Coast Guard
First downs	7	12
Rushing yards	144	5
Passes attempted	16	39
Passes completed	3	14
Passes intercepted by	4	0
Passing yards	80	186
Yards penalized	120	45
Punts–average	8–36.0	4–27.5
Fumbles lost	4	8
