= Nick Denes =

Football, basketball, and baseball coach

Biographical details
- Born: December 16, 1906; Bucharest, Romania
- Died: November 28, 1975 (aged 68); Bowling Green, Kentucky, U.S.

Coaching career (HC unless noted)

Football
- 1927: Champaign HS (IL) (backfield)
- 1929–1936: Corbin HS (KY)
- 1937–1938: Tennessee JC
- 1939–1956: Louisville Male HS (KY)
- 1957–1967: Western Kentucky

Basketball
- 1929–1937: Corbin HS (KY)

Baseball
- 1958–1962: Western Kentucky

Head coaching record
- Overall: 57–39–7 (college football); 48–40–1 (college baseball)
- Bowls: 1–0

Accomplishments and honors

Championships
- Football; 1 OVC (1963)

Awards
- OVC Coach of the Year (1963)

Nicholas George Denes (Romanian: Nicolae George Deneș; December 16, 1906 – November 28, 1975) was an American football, basketball, and baseball coach. He served as the head football coach at Western Kentucky University from 1957 to 1967, compiling a record of 57–39–7. His 1963 Western Kentucky Hilltoppers football team went undefeated, winning the Ohio Valley Conference conference title and the 1963 Tangerine Bowl. Denes was also the head baseball coach at Western Kentucky from 1958 to 1962, tallying a mark of 48–40–1. Nick Denes Field, the home venue for the Western Kentucky Hilltoppers baseball team, is named for him. Denes was the head football coach at the University of Tennessee Junior College—now known as the University of Tennessee at Martin—from 1937 to 1938. He coached athletics at Corbin High School in Corbin, Kentucky from 1929 to 1937 and at Louisville Male High School in Louisville, Kentucky from 1939 to 1957.

== Early life and education ==
Denes was born in 1906 in Bucharest, Romania and raised in Garrett, Indiana. He received a bachelor of science in education in 1929 graduated from the University of Illinois at Urbana–Champaign and received a master's degree from the University of Kentucky.

== Coaching career ==
Denes began his coaching career in 1927, as a backfield coach for the football team at Champaign High School in Champaign, Illinois. In 1929 he was hired as head football and head basketball coach at Corbin High School in Corbin, Kentucky. His football teams compiled a record of 63–11–5 in eight seasons. They were champions of the Cumberland Valley Conference four times (1931, 1933–1935) and runners-up twice (1930, 1932). His basketball teams were 142–39 and won the Cumberland Valley Conference four times (1929, 1931, 1932, 1936).

== Death ==
Denes died on November 28, 1975, at Greenview Hospital in Bowling Green, Kentucky.

== Head coaching record ==
=== College football ===
Year	Team	Overall	Conference	Standing	Bowl/playoffs
Western Kentucky Hilltoppers (Ohio Valley Conference) (1957–1967)
1957	Western Kentucky	5–3–1	1–3–1	T–4th	
1958	Western Kentucky	4–5	2–4	T–5th	
1959	Western Kentucky	5–4	3–3	4th	
1960	Western Kentucky	2–6–1	1–4–1	T–6th	
1961	Western Kentucky	6–3	4–2	3rd	
1962	Western Kentucky	5–3	3–3	5th	
1963	Western Kentucky	10–0–1	7–0	1st	W Tangerine
1964	Western Kentucky	6–3–1	3–3–1	T–3rd	
1965	Western Kentucky	2–6–2	1–5–1	7th	
1966	Western Kentucky	5–5	3–4	6th	
1967	Western Kentucky	7–1–1	5–1–1	2nd	
Western Kentucky:		57–39–7	33–32–5		
Total:		57–39–7			
National championship Conference title Conference division title or championship game berth
