= 2002 Eastern Illinois Panthers football team =

American college football season

2002 Eastern Illinois Panthers football
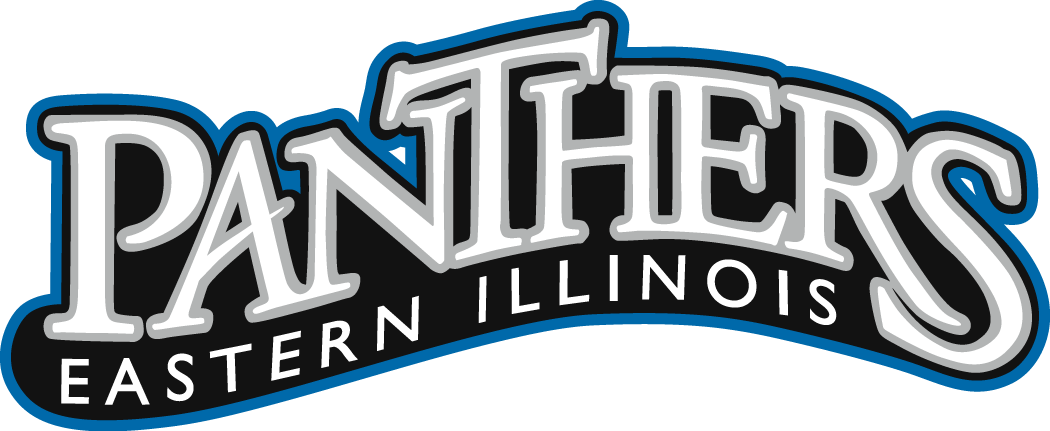

OVC co-champion

NCAA Division I-AA First Round, L 9–48 vs. Western Illinois
- Conference: Ohio Valley Conference

Ranking
- Sports Network: No. 15
- Record: 8–4 (5–1 OVC)
- Head coach: Bob Spoo (16th season)
- Offensive coordinator: Roy Wittke (13th season)
- Defensive coordinator: Roc Bellantoni (1st season)
- Home stadium: O'Brien Stadium

2002 Ohio Valley Conference football standings
	Conf.			Overall
Team	W		L	W		L
No. 13 Eastern Illinois +^	5	–	1	8	–	4
No. 20 Murray State +^	5	–	1	7	–	5
No. 21 Eastern Kentucky	4	–	2	8	–	4
No. 24 Southeast Missouri State	4	–	2	8	–	4
Tennessee Tech	2	–	4	5	–	7
Tennessee State	1	–	5	2	–	10
Tennessee–Martin	0	–	6	2	–	10
+ – Conference co-champions; ^ – NCAA Division I-AA playoff participant; Rankings from The Sports Network poll

The 2002 Eastern Illinois Panthers represented Eastern Illinois University as a member of the Ohio Valley Conference (OVC) during the 2002 NCAA Division I-AA football season. Led by 16th-year head coach Bob Spoo, the Panthers compiling an overall record of 8–4 and shared the OVC title with a mark of 5–1 in conference play. They were invited to the NCAA Division I-AA Football Championship playoff, where they lost to Western Illinois in the first round.

Quarterback Tony Romo's efforts earned him the Walter Payton Award given to the most outstanding offensive player in NCAA Division I-AA, now known as NCAA Division I Football Championship Subdivision. Despite not being selected at the 2003 NFL draft, Romo later signed with the Dallas Cowboys as a free agent, eventually landing the starting job in 2006 season, and earned four Pro Bowl selections before his retirement in 2016.

== Schedule ==
Date	Time	Opponent	Rank	Site	Result	Attendance	Source
August 31	10:00 p.m.	at Hawaii*	No. 4	Aloha Stadium; Honolulu, HI	L 36–61	39,958	
September 14	1:10 p.m.	at Kansas State*	No. 8	KSU Stadium; Manhattan, KS	L 13–63	45,642	
September 21	5:00 p.m.	Indiana State	No. 13	O'Brien Stadium; Charleston, IL	W 26–19	8,340	
September 28		Illinois State	No. 13	O'Brien Stadium; Charleston, IL (rivalry)	W 45–10	10,731	
October 5		at Tennessee Tech	No. 13	Tucker Stadium; Cookeville, TN	W 35–28	10,850	
October 12		No. 19 Eastern Kentucky	No. 9	O'Brien Stadium; Charleston, IL	W 25–24	8,397	
October 19		at Southeast Missouri State	No. 7	Houck Stadium; Cape Girardeau, MO	W 44–27	9,178	
November 2		at Tennessee State	No. 6	The Coliseum; Nashville, TN	W 54–48	7,216	
November 9		Tennessee–Martin	No. 6	O'Brien Stadium; Charleston, IL	W 55–43	3,822	
November 16		Florida Atlantic*	No. 3	O'Brien Stadium; Charleston, IL	W 47–6	3,740	
November 23		at Murray State	No. 2	Roy Stewart Stadium; Murray, KY	L 35–37	6,112	
November 30		at No. 3 Western Illinois*	No. 10	Hanson Field; Macomb, IL (NCAA Division I-AA First Round)	L 9–48	2,429	
*Non-conference game; Rankings from The Sports Network Poll released prior to the game; All times are in Central time

== Roster ==
2002 Eastern Illinois Panthers football team roster
Players
Coaches
Offense

Pos.	#	Name	Class
QB	11	Justin Duhai	Fr
QB	12	Ben King	Fr
QB	13	Kyle Kissack	Sr
QB	17	Tony Romo	Sr
RB	22	J. R. Taylor	Sr
OL	75	Eric Johnson	Fr
G	76	Kevin Hill	Sr
OT	77	Mike Bujnak	So
OL	78	David Johanson	Fr
OT	79	Clayton George	Fr
WR	80	Will Bumphus	Sr
WR	81	Dawanzelle Hopson	Jr
WR	83	Brandon Pettway	Jr
TE	86	Adam Parsill	Fr
WR	87	Matt Frazee	So
TE	88	Nick Eller	Jr

Defense

Pos.	#	Name	Class
SS	6	Fred Miller	Jr
CB	8	Nick Allison	So
DE	20	Willie Bess	So
DB	21	Terrance Sanders	Fr
DT	91	Mike Morley	Fr
DE	92	Travis Wanzeck	Fr
DT	93	Curtis Lester	Fr
DT	94	Will Bihun	Fr
DT	95	Ed Donoghue	Sr
DE	96	Kory Lothe	Fr
DT	97	Marcus Lorick	So
DT	98	Damien McCottrell	Jr
LB	99	Lance Thompson	Sr

Special teams

Pos.	#	Name	Class
P	33	Tom Schofield	Fr

Head coach

- Bob Spoo

Coordinators/assistant coaches

Legend

- (C) Team captain
- (S) Suspended
- (I) Ineligible
- Injured
- Redshirt

Roster
Last update: 2002-12-16

== Game summaries ==
=== At Kansas State ===
	1	2	3	4	Total
Panthers	13	0	0	0	13
Wildcats	15	28	13	7	63

Tony Romo was 13-14 for 120 yards and a TD in the first quarter, but Kansas State grabbed control and cruised to the 50-point win.

== Team players in the NFL ==
No Eastern Illinois players were selected in the 2003 NFL draft.

The following finished their college career in 2002, were not drafted, but played in the NFL.

Player	Position	First NFL team
Tony Romo	Quarterback	Dallas Cowboys
