= 1964 Middle Tennessee Blue Raiders football team =

American college football season

1964 Middle Tennessee Blue Raiders football

OVC champion Grantland Rice Bowl champion

Grantland Rice Bowl, W 20–0 vs. Muskingum
- Conference: Ohio Valley Conference
- Record: 8–2–1 (6–1 OVC)
- Head coach: Charles M. Murphy (18th season)
- Captains: J. Armstrong; H. Petty
- Home stadium: Horace Jones Field

1964 Ohio Valley Conference football standings
	Conf.					Overall
Team	W		L		T	W		L		T
Middle Tennessee $	6	–	1	–	0	7	–	2	–	1
Austin Peay	5	–	1	–	1	8	–	1	–	1
Western Kentucky	3	–	3	–	1	6	–	3	–	1
Murray State	3	–	3	–	1	5	–	4	–	1
Morehead State	3	–	4	–	0	5	–	4	–	0
East Tennessee State	3	–	4	–	0	5	–	5	–	0
Eastern Kentucky	2	–	4	–	1	3	–	5	–	1
Tennessee Tech	1	–	6	–	0	1	–	9	–	0
$ – Conference champion

The 1964 Middle Tennessee Blue Raiders football team represented the Middle Tennessee State College—now known as Middle Tennessee State University—as a member of the Ohio Valley Conference (OVC) during the 1964 NCAA College Division football season. Led by 18th-year head coach Charles M. Murphy, the Blue Raiders compiled a record an overall record of 8–2–1 with a mark of 6–1 in conference play, winning the OVC title. Middle Tennessee was invited to the 1964 Grantland Rice Bowl, where they beat Muskingum. The team's captains were J. Armstrong and H. Petty.

== Schedule ==
Date	Opponent	Site	Result	Attendance	Source
September 19	Florence State*	Horace Jones Field; Murfreesboro, TN	W 21–3	7,500	
September 26	at Tennessee–Martin*	Pacer Stadium; Martin, TN	T 0–0	5,000	
October 3	at Western Kentucky	Bowling Green, KY (rivalry)	W 9–0	8,041–8,500	
October 10	Eastern Kentucky	Horace Jones Field; Murfreesboro, TN	W 20–13	6,000	
October 17	at Chattanooga*	Chamberlain Field; Chattanooga, TN	L 14–19	7,000	
October 24	Morehead State	Horace Jones Field; Murfreesboro, TN	W 13–0	8,000	
October 31	Austin Peay	Horace Jones Field; Murfreesboro, TN	L 7–9	7,500	
November 7	Murray State	Horace Jones Field; Murfreesboro, TN	W 14–12	8,500	
November 14	at East Tennessee State	State College Stadium; Johnson City, TN	W 14–9	5,000	
November 26	at Tennessee Tech	Overhill Field; Cookeville, TN	W 24–0	5,500	
December 12	Muskingum*	Horace Jones Field; Murfreesboro, TN (Grantland Rice Bowl)	W 20–0	4,000	
*Non-conference game
