= 2002 Southern Illinois Salukis football team =

American college football season

2002 Southern Illinois Salukis football
- Conference: Gateway Football Conference
- Record: 4–8 (2–5 Gateway)
- Head coach: Jerry Kill (2nd season)
- Offensive coordinator: Matt Limegrover (2nd season)
- Defensive coordinator: Tracy Claeys (2nd season)
- Home stadium: McAndrew Stadium

2002 Gateway Football Conference standings
	Conf.			Overall
Team	W		L	W		L
No. 1 Western Kentucky +^	6	–	1	12	–	3
No. 5 Western Illinois +^	6	–	1	11	–	2
Youngstown State	4	–	3	7	–	4
Illinois State	4	–	3	6	–	5
Indiana State	3	–	4	5	–	7
Northern Iowa	2	–	5	5	–	6
Southern Illinois	2	–	5	4	–	8
Southwest Missouri State	1	–	6	4	–	7
+ – Conference co-champions; ^ – NCAA Division I-AA playoff participant; Rankings from The Sports Network poll

The 2002 Southern Illinois Salukis football team represented Southern Illinois University as a member of the Gateway Football Conference during the 2002 NCAA Division I-AA football season. They were led by second-year head coach Jerry Kill and played their home games at McAndrew Stadium in Carbondale, Illinois. The Salukis finished the season with a 4–8 record overall and a 2–5 record in conference play.

The Salukis' home opener against Kentucky Wesleyan was the first game to use the lights at McAndrew Stadium since 1973. The stadium's lighting system, which had been damaged by renovations after the 1973 season, was repaired before the season by volunteer workers from the local branch of the International Brotherhood of Electrical Workers.

== Schedule ==
Date	Opponent	Rank	Site	Result	Attendance	Source
August 29	Kentucky Wesleyan*		McAndrew Stadium; Carbondale, IL	W 78–0	12,125	
September 7	Southeast Missouri State*		McAndrew Stadium; Carbondale, IL	L 14–21	11,557	
September 14	at Murray State*		Roy Stewart Stadium; Murray, KY	L 24–42	8,673	
September 21	West Virginia Tech*		McAndrew Stadium; Carbondale, IL	W 72–21	5,843	
September 28	at Eastern Michigan*		Rynearson Stadium; Ypsilanti, MI	L 45–48 ^{2OT}	15,221	
October 5	No. 8 Western Illinois^{†}		McAndrew Stadium; Carbondale, IL	W 54–52	9,237	
October 12	No. 12 Northern Iowa		McAndrew Stadium; Carbondale, IL	W 42–13	10,216	
October 19	at Illinois State	No. 25	Hancock Stadium; Normal, IL	L 14–35	12,415	
October 26	at Southwest Missouri State		Plaster Sports Complex; Springfield, MO	L 28–38	3,283	
November 2	at Youngstown State		Stambaugh Stadium; Youngstown, OH	L 9–21	18,147	
November 9	Indiana State		McAndrew Stadium; Carbondale, IL	L 14–21	3,217	
November 16	No. 15 Western Kentucky		McAndrew Stadium; Carbondale, IL	L 16–48	3,203	
*Non-conference game; ^{†}Homecoming; Rankings from The Sports Network Poll released prior to the game
