= 1964 East Tennessee State Buccaneers football team =

American college football season

1964 East Tennessee State Buccaneers football
- Conference: Ohio Valley Conference
- Record: 5–5 (3–4 OVC)
- Head coach: Star Wood (12th season)
- Home stadium: University Stadium

1964 Ohio Valley Conference football standings
	Conf.					Overall
Team	W		L		T	W		L		T
Middle Tennessee $	6	–	1	–	0	7	–	2	–	1
Austin Peay	5	–	1	–	1	8	–	1	–	1
Western Kentucky	3	–	3	–	1	6	–	3	–	1
Murray State	3	–	3	–	1	5	–	4	–	1
Morehead State	3	–	4	–	0	5	–	4	–	0
East Tennessee State	3	–	4	–	0	5	–	5	–	0
Eastern Kentucky	2	–	4	–	1	3	–	5	–	1
Tennessee Tech	1	–	6	–	0	1	–	9	–	0
$ – Conference champion

The 1964 East Tennessee State Buccaneers football team represented East Tennessee State University as a member of the Ohio Valley Conference (OVC) during the 1964 NCAA College Division football season. Led by 12th-year head coach Star Wood, the Buccaneers compiled an overall record of 5–5, with a mark of 3–4 in conference play, and finished tied for fifth in the OVC.

== Schedule ==
Date	Opponent	Site	Result	Attendance	Source
September 12	California (PA)*	University Stadium; Johnson City, TN	W 21–6	6,000	
September 19	at Murray State	Cutchin Stadium; Murray, KY	L 14–26	5,500	
September 26	Western Kentucky	University Stadium; Johnson City, TN	W 16–9	6,500	
October 3	at Chattanooga*	Chamberlain Field; Chattanooga, TN	L 0–7	10,000	
October 10	at Tennessee Tech	Overall Field; Cookeville, TN	W 7–6	4,000	
October 17	at Eastern Kentucky	Hanger Field; Richmond, KY	L 13–35	8,500	
October 24	Wofford*	University Stadium; Johnson City, TN	W 14–0	7,500	
October 31	Morehead State	University Stadium; Johnson City, TN	W 21–9	3,500	
November 7	at Austin Peay	Municipal Stadium; Clarksville, TN	L 20–27	5,500	
November 14	Middle Tennessee	University Stadium; Johnson City, TN	L 9–14	4,000	
*Non-conference game; Source:
