= 1958 East Tennessee State Buccaneers football team =

American college football season

1958 East Tennessee State Buccaneers football
- Conference: Ohio Valley Conference
- Record: 5–4 (4–2 OVC)
- Head coach: Star Wood (6th season)
- Home stadium: College Stadium

1958 Ohio Valley Conference football standings
	Conf.					Overall
Team	W		L		T	W		L		T
No. 11 Middle Tennessee +	5	–	1	–	0	8	–	2	–	0
Tennessee Tech +	5	–	1	–	0	7	–	3	–	0
East Tennessee State	4	–	2	–	0	5	–	4	–	0
Eastern Kentucky	3	–	3	–	0	3	–	6	–	0
Western Kentucky	2	–	4	–	0	4	–	5	–	0
Murray State	2	–	4	–	0	3	–	7	–	0
Morehead State	0	–	6	–	0	0	–	8	–	1
+ – Conference co-champions; Rankings from UPI small college poll

The 1958 East Tennessee State Buccaneers football team represented East Tennessee State College (now known as East Tennessee State University) as a member of the Ohio Valley Conference (OVC) during the 1958 college football season. Led by sixth-year head coach Star Wood, the Buccaneers compiled an overall record of 5–4, with a mark of 4–2 in conference play, and finished third in the OVC.

== Schedule ==
Date	Opponent	Site	Result	Attendance	Source
September 13	at Appalachian State*	College Field; Boone, NC	L 0–12	3,500	
September 20	at Murray State	Cutchin Stadium; Murray, KY	W 12–6	3,500	
September 27	Western Kentucky	College Stadium; Johnson City, TN	W 8–0	6,000	
October 11	at Tennessee Tech	Overall Field; Cookeville, TN	W 25–14	4,000	
October 18	at Eastern Kentucky	Hanger Field; Richmond, KY	L 6–13	4,000	
October 25	at Wofford*	Synder Field; Spartanburg, SC	W 24–20	3,500	
November 1	Morehead State^{†}	College Stadium; Johnson City, TN	W 19–3	3,500	
November 8	at Austin Peay*	Municipal Stadium; Clarksville, TN	L 19–25	3,500	
November 15	No. 15 Middle Tennessee	College Stadium; Johnson City, TN	L 20–27	3,500	
*Non-conference game; ^{†}Homecoming; Rankings from UPI Poll released prior to the game; Source:
