= 2002 Northern Iowa Panthers football team =

American college football season

2002 Northern Iowa Panthers football
- Conference: Gateway Football Conference
- Record: 5–6 (2–5 Gateway)
- Head coach: Mark Farley (2nd season)
- Offensive coordinator: Bill Salmon (2nd season)
- Home stadium: UNI-Dome

2002 Gateway Football Conference standings
	Conf.			Overall
Team	W		L	W		L
No. 1 Western Kentucky +^	6	–	1	12	–	3
No. 5 Western Illinois +^	6	–	1	11	–	2
Youngstown State	4	–	3	7	–	4
Illinois State	4	–	3	6	–	5
Indiana State	3	–	4	5	–	7
Northern Iowa	2	–	5	5	–	6
Southern Illinois	2	–	5	4	–	8
Southwest Missouri State	1	–	6	4	–	7
+ – Conference co-champions; ^ – NCAA Division I-AA playoff participant; Rankings from The Sports Network poll

The 2002 Northern Iowa Panthers football team represented the University of Northern Iowa as a member of the Gateway Football Conference during the 2002 NCAA Division I-AA football season. Led by second-year head coach Mark Farley, the Panthers compiled an overall record of 5–6 with a mark of 2–5 in conference play, tying for sixth place in the Gateway. Northern Iowa played home games at the UNI-Dome in Cedar Falls, Iowa.

== Schedule ==
Date	Time	Opponent	Rank	Site	Result	Attendance	Source
August 29	7:05 p.m.	Wayne State (MI)*	No. 3	UNI-Dome; Cedar Falls, IA	W 34–0	10,221	
September 7	6:05 p.m.	at Oklahoma State*	No. 2	Lewis Field; Stillwater, OK	L 10–45	40,085	
September 21	4:05 p.m.	Stephen F. Austin*	No. 6	UNI-Dome; Cedar Falls, IA	W 31–24	13,142	
September 28	8:00 p.m.	at Cal Poly	No. 6	Mustang Stadium; San Luis Obispo, CA	W 29–26 ^{3OT}		
October 5	4:05 p.m.	No. 25 Western Kentucky^{†}	No. 6	UNI-Dome; Cedar Falls, IA	L 12–31	14,684	
October 12	7:00 p.m.	at Southern Illinois	No. 12	McAndrew Stadium; Carbondale, IL	L 13–42	10,216	
October 19	3:00 p.m.	at No. 17 Youngstown State	No. 21	Stambaugh Stadium; Youngstown, OH	W 22–7	18,699	
October 26	4:05 p.m.	Illinois State	No. 17	UNI-Dome; Cedar Falls, IA	L 20–31	9,241	
November 2	1:05 p.m.	at Indiana State		Memorial Stadium; Terre Haute, IN	L 19–21		
November 9	4:05 p.m.	at No. 8 Western Illinois		UNI-Dome; Cedar Falls, IA	L 12–35	9,443	
November 16	5:05 p.m.	Southwest Missouri State		UNI-Dome; Cedar Falls, IA	W 25–24		
*Non-conference game; ^{†}Homecoming; Rankings from The Sports Network Poll released prior to the game; All times are in Central time

== Roster ==
2002 Northern Iowa Panthers football team roster
Players
Coaches
Offense

Pos.	#	Name	Class
WR	2	Brad Richtsmeier	Sr
QB	12	Griff Jurgens	Sr

Defense

Pos.	#	Name	Class
DB	2	Benny Sapp	Jr

Special teams

Pos.	#	Name	Class
P	8	Derrick Frost	Sr

Head coach

- Mark Farley

Coordinators/assistant coaches

- Bill Ennis-Inge – Linebackers

Legend

- (C) Team captain
- (S) Suspended
- (I) Ineligible
- Injured
- Redshirt

Roster
Last update: 2002-10-25
