= 2002 Indiana State Sycamores football team =

American college football season

2002 Indiana State Sycamores football
- Conference: Gateway Football Conference
- Record: 5–7 (3–4 Gateway)
- Head coach: Tim McGuire (5th season)
- Home stadium: Memorial Stadium

2002 Gateway Football Conference standings
	Conf.			Overall
Team	W		L	W		L
No. 1 Western Kentucky +^	6	–	1	12	–	3
No. 5 Western Illinois +^	6	–	1	11	–	2
Youngstown State	4	–	3	7	–	4
Illinois State	4	–	3	6	–	5
Indiana State	3	–	4	5	–	7
Northern Iowa	2	–	5	5	–	6
Southern Illinois	2	–	5	4	–	8
Southwest Missouri State	1	–	6	4	–	7
+ – Conference co-champions; ^ – NCAA Division I-AA playoff participant; Rankings from The Sports Network poll

The 2002 Indiana State Sycamores football team represented Indiana State University as a member of the Gateway Football Conference during the 2002 NCAA Division I-AA football season. They were led by fifth-year head coach Tim McGuire and played their home games at Memorial Stadium in Terre Haute, Indiana. The Sycamores finished the season with a 5–7 record overall and a 3–4 record in conference play.

== Schedule ==
Date	Time	Opponent	Site	Result	Attendance	Source
August 29	6:30 pm	at Western Michigan*	Waldo Stadium; Kalamazoo, MI	L 17–48		
September 7	6:30 pm	Cumberland*	Memorial Stadium; Terre Haute, IN	W 14–10		
September 14	1:00 pm	at Ball State*	Ball State Stadium; Muncie, IN (Blue Key Victory Bell)	L 21–23	12,924	
September 21	6:00 pm	at No. 13 Eastern Illinois*	O'Brien Stadium; Charleston, IL	L 19–26	8,340	
September 28	1:00 pm	Murray State	Memorial Stadium; Terre Haute, IN	W 34–31 ^{OT}	3,762	
October 5	7:00 pm	at Youngstown State	Stambaugh Stadium; Youngstown, Ohio	L 16–31	18,879	
October 12	6:00 pm	Southwest Missouri State*	Memorial Stadium; Terre Haute, IN	W 23–20 ^{OT}		
October 19	12:40 pm	at No. 10 Western Illinois	Hanson Field; Macomb, IL	L 21–52	8,562	
October 26	5:30 pm	at No. 22 Western Kentucky	L. T. Smith Stadium; Bowling Green, KY	L 7–24	11,200	
November 2	1:40 pm	Northern Iowa^{†}	Memorial Stadium; Terre Haute, IN	W 21–19		
November 9	2:30 pm	at Southern Illinois	McAndrew Stadium; Carbondale, IL	W 21–14	3,217	
November 16	5:30 pm	Illinois State	Memorial Stadium; Terre Haute, IN	L 12–20	2,652	
*Non-conference game; ^{†}Homecoming; Rankings from NCAA Division I-AA Football Committee Poll released prior to the game; All times are in Eastern time
