= Dale Lindsey =

American football player and coach (born 1943)

No. 51, 54
- Position: Linebacker

Personal information
- Born: January 18, 1943 (age 83); Bedford, Indiana, U.S.
- Listed height: 6 ft 2 in (1.88 m)
- Listed weight: 223 lb (101 kg)

Career information
- High school: Bowling Green (Bowling Green, Kentucky)
- College: Kentucky (1961); Western Kentucky (1962–1964)
- NFL draft: 1965: 7th round, 97th overall pick
- AFL draft: 1965: Red Shirt 6th round, 44th overall pick

Career history

Playing
- Cleveland Browns (1965–1972); New Orleans Saints (1973)

Coaching
- Cleveland Browns (1974) Linebackers coach; Portland Thunder (1975) Defensive coordinator; Warren Central HS (Kentucky) (1976–1978) Head coach; Toronto Argonauts (1979) Defensive assistant; Toronto Argonauts (1980–1982) Defensive coordinator; Boston Breakers (1983) Linebackers coach; New Jersey Generals (1984–1985) Defensive coordinator; Green Bay Packers (1986–1987) Linebackers coach; SMU (1988–1989) Defensive coordinator; New England Patriots (1990) Defensive line coach; Tampa Bay Buccaneers (1991) Linebackers coach; San Diego Chargers (1992–1996) Linebackers coach; Washington Redskins (1997–1998) Linebackers coach; Chicago Bears (1999–2001) Linebackers coach; San Diego Chargers (2002–2003) Defensive coordinator; Washington Redskins (2004–2006) Linebackers coach; San Diego (2007) Linebackers coach; New Mexico State (2009–2010) Assistant head coach/linebackers coach; New Mexico St. (2011) Defensive coordinator; San Diego (2012) Defensive coordinator; San Diego (2013–2022) Head coach

Awards and highlights
- As player: First-team All-American (1964); Western Kentucky Hilltoppers No. 44 Jersey Retired; As coach: 7× (PFL champion (2014–2019, 2021); 3× (PFL Coach of the Year (2014, 2016, 2019)

Career NFL statistics
- Fumble recoveries: 3
- Interceptions: 8
- Touchdowns: 1
- Stats at Pro Football Reference

Head coaching record
- Postseason: NCAA: 2–4–0 (.333)
- Career: NCAA: 80–30–0 (.727)
- Coaching profile at Pro Football Reference

Phillip Dale Lindsey (born January 18, 1943) is an American football coach and former player. He was the head football coach at the University of San Diego. Lindsey has also worked as a coach in the National Football League (NFL), the Canadian Football League (CFL), and the United States Football League (USFL).

== Early life ==
Lindsey attended and played high school football at Bowling Green High School in Bowling Green, Kentucky, where he was an All-State player.

== College career ==
After high school, Lindsey signed with the University of Kentucky, where he was part of the infamous Thin Thirty team, but quit the team in the spring of his freshman year. He then transferred to Western Kentucky University, where he starred on the Hilltoppers's undefeated 1963 team that won the Tangerine Bowl.

== Professional career ==
=== As a player ===
Lindsey was drafted in the seventh round of the 1965 NFL draft by the Cleveland Browns, where he played from 1965 to 1972. He then signed with the New Orleans Saints in 1973.

=== As a coach ===
After his playing career, Lindsey was a coach for several different NFL teams, including the Green Bay Packers, New England Patriots, Tampa Bay Buccaneers, Washington Redskins, Chicago Bears and the San Diego Chargers. He was also a coach for the Toronto Argonauts of the Canadian Football League and the Boston Breakers and the New Jersey Generals of the United States Football League.

In 1988, Lindsey joined Forrest Gregg at SMU. As the defensive coordinator, he helped to revitalize the historic SMU football program after the NCAA executed its one and only death penalty for a college football program. During the 1989 season, SMU's first season back after 1987, Lindsey's defense was instrumental in SMU's wins over UConn and North Texas.

He was terminated as the linebackers coach for the Washington Redskins on January 16, 2007. This was his second stint with Washington. He was one of several former NFL coordinators serving as a position coach on the Redskins' coach staff.

Lindsey was hired as the head coach for the University of San Diego in 2012, a position he held through the 2022 season. The school announced his retirement following the season, but Lindsey maintains he was fired. At the time of his departure he had the most wins of any head coach in school history and held the fourth highest winning percentage in FCS football.

== Head coaching record ==
=== College ===
Year	Team	Overall	Conference	Standing	Bowl/playoffs	STATS^{#}	FCS^{°}
San Diego Toreros (Pioneer Football League) (2013–present)
2013	San Diego	8–3	0–0 (7–1)	T–1st (Note: San Diego declared itself ineligible for consideration as conference champions due to improper financial aid awarded to players. Their official conference record for this season is recognized as 0–0.)			
2014	San Diego	9–3	7–1	T–1st	L NCAA Division I First Round		
2015	San Diego	9–2	7–1	T–1st			
2016	San Diego	10–2	8–0	1st	L NCAA Division I Second Round	19	T–21
2017	San Diego	10–3	8–0	1st	L NCAA Division I Second Round	23	25
2018	San Diego	9–3	8–0	1st	L NCAA Division I First Round	25	20
2019	San Diego	9–3	8–0	1st	L NCAA Division I First Round		
2020–21	San Diego	4–2	4–2	T–2nd			
2021	San Diego	7–4	7–1	T–1st			
2022	San Diego	5–5	4–3	5th			
San Diego:		80–30	61–8 (68–9)				
Total:		80–30					
National championship Conference title Conference division title or championship game berth
^{#}Rankings from final STATS poll.; ^{°}Rankings from final FCS Coaches poll.
