= Western Kentucky Hilltoppers football =

College football team that represents Western Kentucky University

2026 Western Kentucky Hilltoppers football team
- First season: 1908; 118 years ago (Note: WKU did not start playing sanctioned games until the 1913 season; 113 years ago.)
- Athletic director: Todd Stewart
- Head coach: Tyson Helton; 7th season, 57–37 (.606)
- Location: Bowling Green, Kentucky
- Stadium: Houchens Industries–L. T. Smith Stadium (capacity: 22,000)
- NCAA division: Division I FBS
- Conference: Conference USA
- Colors: Red and white
- All-time record: 632–437–30 (.589)
- Bowl record: 11–6 (.647)

NCAA Division I FCS championships
- 2002

Conference championships
- SIAA: 1932 OVC: 1952, 1963, 1970, 1971, 1973, 1975, 1978, 1980, 2000, 2002 C-USA: 2015, 2016

Division championships
- C-USA East: 2015, 2016, 2021
- Consensus All-Americans: 1 (FBS), 29 (FCS)
- Rivalries: Middle Tennessee (rivalry); Eastern Kentucky (rivalry); Murray State (rivalry)
- Fight song: Stand Up and Cheer!
- Mascot: Big Red
- Marching band: Big Red Marching Band
- Outfitter: Nike
- Website: WKUSports.com

The Western Kentucky Hilltoppers football program is a college football team that represents Western Kentucky University. The team competes at the NCAA Division I Football Bowl Subdivision level and represents the university as a member of Conference USA in the Eastern division. The 2002 team was the FCS national champion. The program has 13 conference championships (1 SIAA, 9 OVC, 1 Gateway, 2 Conference USA) and 7 FBS-level bowl game victories. The Hilltoppers play their home games at Houchens Industries–L. T. Smith Stadium in Bowling Green, Kentucky and the team's head football coach is Tyson Helton.

== History ==
=== Early history (1908–1967) ===
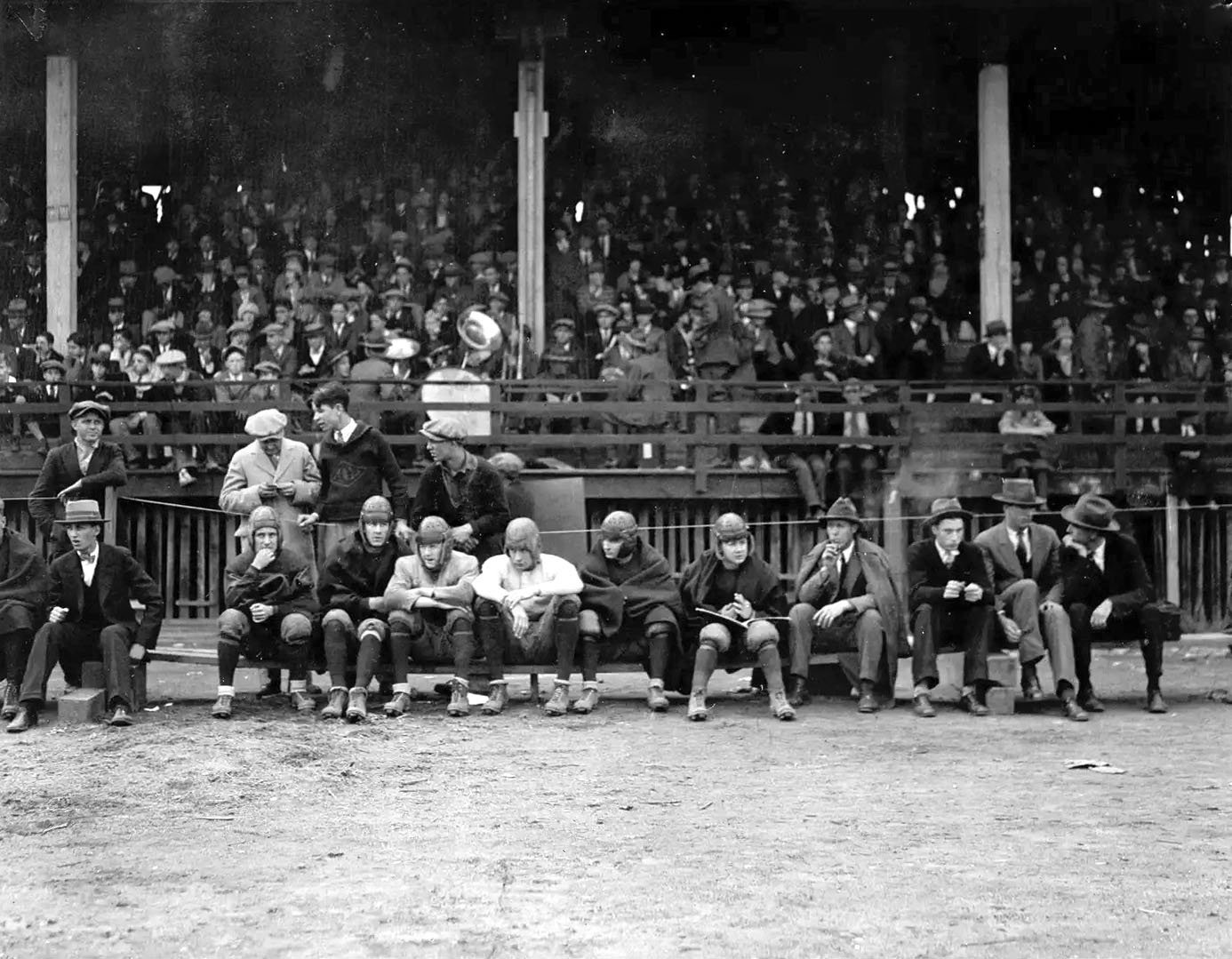
WKU players c. 1913

Western Kentucky first fielded a football team in 1908 but did not start playing sanctioned games until the 1913 season. M.A. Leiper and Roy Manchester are the first noted coaches for WKU. The two men teamed up to coach the Hilltoppers for their inaugural season, which consisted only of a 20–0 win over Elizabethtown. J.L. Arthur took over the program for three years from 1914 to 1916, coaching a total of 14 games, 6 of which were against Eastern Kentucky.

From 1917 to 1919, the Hilltoppers didn't compete in football due to World War I. In 1920, L. T. Smith, namesake of the Hilltoppers' home stadium, took the reins and coached the team for two seasons. From 1922 to 1928, the Hilltoppers saw their first success as Coach E.A. Diddle took over the football program for seven seasons, winning four while also coaching the Western Kentucky Hilltoppers basketball team. Diddle, who was a dual-athlete himself, encouraged his players to participate in multiple sports so they could stay in shape. His first team set a school record for wins that would stand for 41 years and his last team claimed to be state champions. When he retired from coaching football in 1928, Diddle posted a record of 38–24–2. The Hilltoppers outscored opponents 171–7 in Diddle's final year of coaching the program. After Diddle left the football program to focus on coaching basketball, WKU football went through a series of instability in coaching, but still successfully won 9 seasons.

In 1929, Carl "Swede" Anderson took over as head coach. Anderson led the Hilltoppers to a 7–3 record before leaving to take the head coach job over the Kansas State freshman football team. In 1934, Carl Anderson returned for a second stint with the Hilltoppers where he served as head coach through the 1937 season posting a 24–9–3 record with wins over EKU in all four seasons. The Hilltoppers were very successful in this era posting an outstanding a 60–20–4 record. After Anderson left the hill once again, this time to be an assistant coach at Indiana, the Hilltoppers selected Gander Terry to lead the program. In their four seasons under Terry, the Hilltoppers went 25–9–3 beating rivals Middle Tennessee and Eastern Kentucky in every game they played. Terry left the program after the 1941 season following a 4–5–1 record, the Hilltopper's first losing season since 1925. Arnold Winkenhofer took over in 1942 coaching the Toppers for one season before the program was stopped from 1943 to 1945 due to World War II. In 1946, Jesse Thomas returned to the Hill for his second stint as head coach. Thomas only stuck around WKU two more seasons with much less success than his first go around posting a 5–10–2 record.

Jack Clayton provided some much-needed stability to the WKU football program where he served as head coach for 9 seasons. In 1949, after losing the first two games to start the season, Clayton started a freshman quarterback by the name of Jimmy Feix winning 5 of the last 7 games that season. By 1952, with Feix now in his senior year, Clayton coached WKU to their first Ohio Valley Conference championship, tied the school record for wins, and the school's first bowl appearance, winning 34–19 over Arkansas State in the Refrigerator Bowl, finishing the season 9–1. Feix became the first WKU football athlete ever to earn All-America honors after posting the highest pass completion percentage in the nation (.612). Under Clayton, the Hilltoppers posted a record of 50–33–2 before he left to coach at Northwestern Louisiana State College, his alma mater. Nick Denes, who was also a Western Kentucky Hilltoppers baseball head coach and for whom Nick Denes Field is named, coached WKU football for 11 seasons. In his time on the Hill, Denes compiled a 57–39–7 record for a .587 winning percentage. In 1963, Denes led the Hilltoppers to their second bowl game victory, defeating Coast Guard 27–0 in the Tangerine Bowl, a season where the Hilltoppers went 10–0–1 and set a new school record for wins. Denes retired after the 1967 season following a 42–19 win over Murray State.

=== Jimmy Feix (1968–1983) ===
After serving under Nick Denes as an assistant coach for all 11 seasons, Jimmy Feix was promoted to head coach. In his 16 seasons at the helm, Feix compiled an impressive 105–56–6 record (.6488). His 14 teams that competed in the Ohio Valley Conference went 67–28–2 (.701) in conference play. The Hilltoppers won six Ohio Valley Conference championships between 1970 and 1980. Feix became the most successful and longest-tenured coach in Western Kentucky football history while leading the Hilltoppers in a transition from NCAA Division II to NCAA Division I-AA (now FCS). In 1973, the Hilltoppers went undefeated in the regular season before competing in the first-year NCAA Division II championship playoffs. They made it to the championship game against Louisiana Tech coming up just short and finishing the season 12–1, setting a new school record for wins that still stands. In 1975, the Hilltoppers made the playoff field again advancing to the title game for the second time, but once again having to settle for runner-up honors finishing their season with an 11–2 record. Feix was named OVC Coach of the Year in 1973, 1978 and 1980 and remains the winningest football coach in WKU history. Feix coached 16 athletes who followed him on the list of WKU football All-Americans.

=== Dave Roberts (1983–1988) ===
Feix retired as head coach moving to work in Alumni Affairs for two years before taking over as director of athletics in 1986. In his vacancy, the Hilltoppers hired former Vanderbilt assistant Dave Roberts to be the head coach with hopes of continuing what Feix started. Roberts struggled through his first three seasons posting a record 10–22–1 before turning things around. In 1987 and 1988 Roberts took the Hilltoppers to the NCAA Division I-AA playoffs coming up short to rival EKU both years. After the 1988 season, Roberts left Western Kentucky for the Northeast Louisiana head coaching job. Though going 16–8 in his last two season, Roberts left with a 26–30–1 record becoming the first Hilltopper coach to leave with a losing record in over 60 years.

=== Jack Harbaugh (1989–2002) ===
Jack Harbaugh served as the Hilltoppers head football coach for 14 seasons, compiling a 91–68 record, three 10+ win seasons, two conference championships (OVC 2000, Gateway 2002) and the 2002 Division I-AA National Championship. Harbaugh took the Hilltopper football program from the depths of despair in the early 1990s to its best stretch since the legendary Jimmy Feix coached on the Hill. In 1992, WKU was on the verge of losing its football program after a state-mandated $6.1 million budget cut. Harbaugh was notified of the plans to shut down the program just before spring practice was about to begin. Having already made up his mind that he was not going to quit, he talked with his players left them a choice: accept defeat and leave, or fight to stay. Now known as the 1992 "Save the Program" team, every player decided to stay, fight, and work to save WKU football. While Harbaugh and the team did their part, former WKU quarterback, coach and athletics director at the time, Jimmy Feix, started an emergency fundraising campaign writing letters and making calls to former WKU players, urging them to buy season tickets. All the efforts paid off and on April 30, 1992, the WKU Board of Regents voted to allow football to stay but with a reduced budget. The Hilltoppers finished the 1992 season with a losing record of 4–6. As the budget remained tight over the next few years WKU managed an 8–3 record in 1993 before having back-to-back losing seasons.

No one ever doubted Harbaugh's ability to coach but he clearly needed better players. In 1994, with unwavering faith in their father, both of his sons, Jim Harbaugh and John Harbaugh, decided to help however they could. While still playing in the NFL, Jim joined the WKU football coaching staff as an NCAA-certified unpaid assistant which allowed him to recruit. John, on the other hand, was a coach at Cincinnati and could rely on his scouting services, deep contacts, and endless high school game footage to help out. Jim set out and started contacting recruits, his first being Willie Taggart, an All-American and four-year starter at quarterback for WKU. Jim also recruited future NFL players Rod Smart and Mel Mitchell to WKU as well as 17 players on the 2002 national championship team. The Hilltoppers went 7–4 in 1996 and returned to the NCAA Playoffs in 1997 behind the arm and legs of quarterback Willie Taggart, which started a long series of winning seasons. Jack and his wife Jackie are credited with saving the program which led to being honored in 2012 with naming rights to the stadium club at L. T. Smith Stadium. This was 20 years after the 1992 "Save the Program" season and 10 years after the 2002 championship season.

=== David Elson (2003–2009) ===
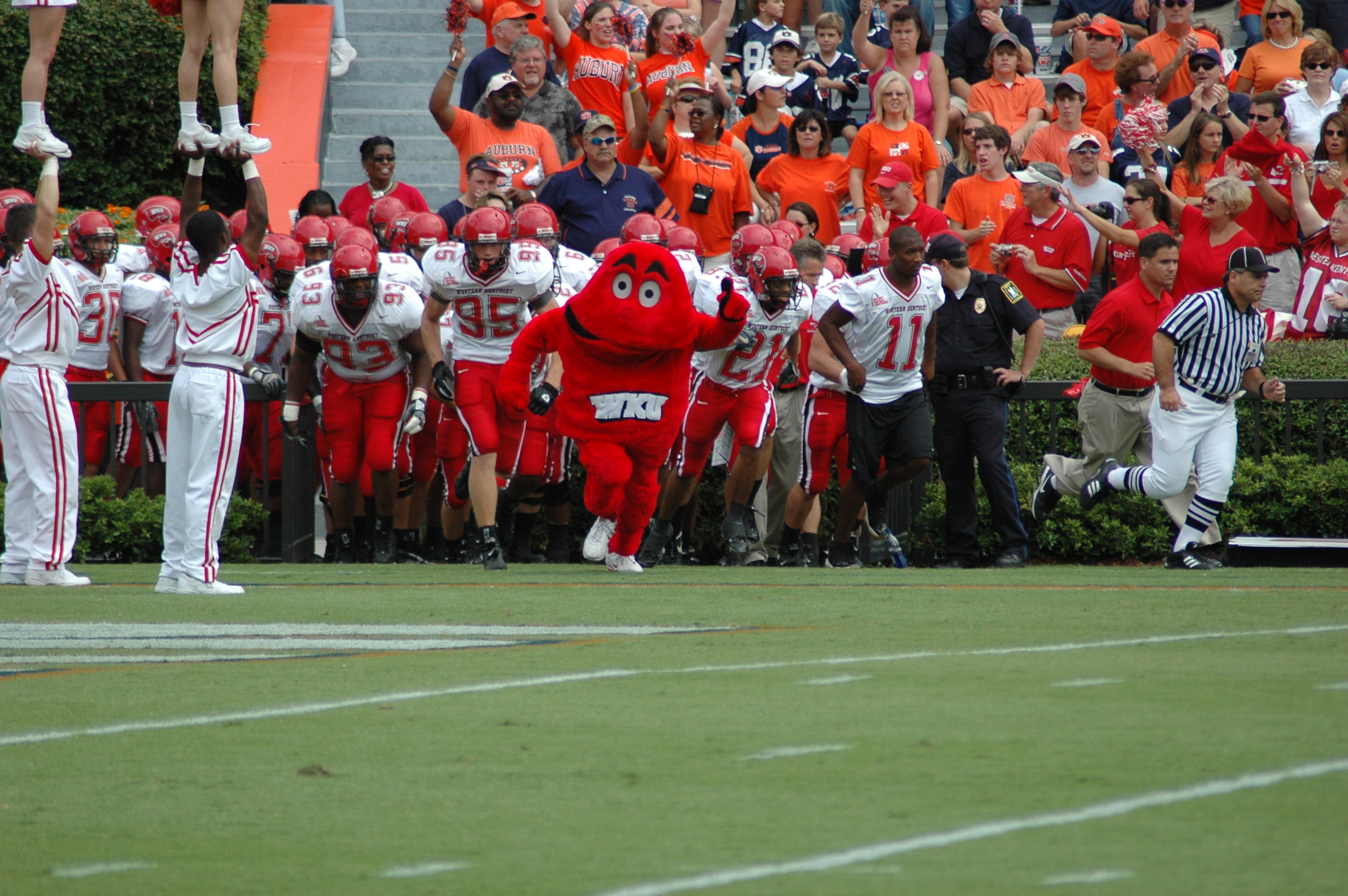
WK players entering the field in 2005

After serving on Harbaugh's coaching staff for seven seasons, David Elson was promoted to head coach where he led the Hilltoppers for seven seasons. Elson's first four seasons as head coach were at the Division I-AA level (now FCS) where he picked up where Harbaugh left and posted four straight winning seasons, a record of 30–17, and two playoff berths. On November 2, 2006, prior to the end of the season, WKU's board of regents voted in favor of moving from NCAA Division I-AA to NCAA Division I-A football (now FBS) and would be joining the Sun Belt Conference in all sports by 2009. The move allowed WKU to add 22 scholarships by 2009 and increase the overall football budget by an estimated $2.5 million by the time the transition was complete.

In 2007, the Hilltoppers began the transition to NCAA Division I FBS as Independents, considered a reclassifying school for both the 2007 and 2008 seasons due to NCAA rules. The Hilltoppers were not eligible to participate in a Sun Belt Conference Championship or a berth in a bowl game until the 2009 season. Knowing it wasn't going to be easy, and without the motivation of being eligible to compete for a championship, Elson and the Hilltoppers set two team goals that season; to win seven games and to go undefeated at home. Both goals required at least one win over an FBS team. If the Hilltoppers won seven games, they got rings. They were able to accomplish the first of those goals, going 7–5 that season as they beat long-time rival MTSU in Murfreesboro, but were unable to hold off Troy at home; both of which were FBS schools and members of the Sun Belt Conference. That win over MTSU in 2007 would be the last major win for the Hilltoppers under Elson. The 2008 season shed a truer light to the transition as the Hilltoppers went 2–10 with no wins over FBS opponents, only beating their two other long-time rivals and FCS-level opponents EKU and Murray State. Things only got worse for the Hilltoppers in 2009 after they finally became full members of the Sun Belt Conference. WKU lost every game that season, going 0–12, posting their worst record in school history. Elson was hopeful to survive the transition as he asked for patience in building the program, but on November 9, 2009, prior to the end of the season, athletic director, Wood Selig had enough and fired Elson. The Hilltoppers went 39–44 under Elson, going 9–27 in his final three seasons (1–26 against FBS opponents).

=== Willie Taggart (2010–2012) ===
WKU Quarterback Legend, Willie Taggart, returned to his alma mater as head football coach in 2010 after leaving his position as Stanford running backs coach, where he served under Jack Harbaugh's son Jim Harbaugh. In their first year under Taggart, coming off a winless season under Elson, WKU finally broke their 26-game losing streak with a 54–21 win at UL Lafayette. The Hilltoppers finished 2–10 that season. From there, Taggart is credited with getting WKU's football program back on track after posting back to back 7–5 regular seasons that included an upset of Kentucky in Lexington in 2012. That was Western Kentucky's first win over a SEC opponent in program history. Despite the surprising 7–5 record in 2011, a season in which the Hilltoppers went 7–1 in their final eight games, they were not invited to a bowl game. It wasn't until the following year, 2012, that the Hilltoppers were invited to their first FBS-level bowl game, the Little Caesar's Bowl.

On December 7, 2012, prior to their December 26 bowl game, Taggart left WKU to accept the head football coach position at South Florida. Lance Guidry, WKU's defensive coordinator was named interim head coach and led the Hilltoppers to their first bowl appearance as an FBS member. In a valiant but unsuccessful effort, WKU was defeated 21–24 by Central Michigan. Taggart, who started all four years as the Hilltoppers quarterback from 1995 to 1998 under Jack Harbaugh, ran a run-heavy West Coast style offense that helped develop leading rushers, Bobby Rainey and Antonio Andrews. Rainey was named Sun Belt Conference Offensive Player of the Year in 2010 and 2011 while Quanterus Smith won Sun Belt Defensive Player of the Year in 2012.

=== Bobby Petrino (2013) ===
Former Louisville, Atlanta Falcons and Arkansas head coach Bobby Petrino was hired as the new head football coach following Taggart's departure. In the news conference announcing Petrino's hiring in December 2012, athletic director Todd Stewart called it a "landmark moment" in the history of WKU football. Keeping the programs momentum going, on April 1, 2013, it was announced that WKU would join Conference USA in all sports effective July 1, 2014, the following season. In their first game under Petrino and to start the season, the Hilltoppers won their second straight game over SEC opponent Kentucky, playing at a neutral site in Nashville, Tennessee. The Hilltoppers finished the 2013 regular season 8–4, posting their best record since 2004, but were once again snubbed from a bowl appearance. In WKU's last season as members of the Sun Belt, Antonio Andrews won Sun Belt Conference Player of the Year and Offensive Player of the Year while Xavius Boyd won Sun Belt Conference Defensive Player of the Year. WKU became the first school in league history to sweep the top three honors with just two players. On January 8, 2014, it was announced that Petrino would leave WKU to return to Louisville to accept the head football coach position.

=== Jeff Brohm (2014–2016) ===
After one season as offensive coordinator for the Hilltoppers, Jeff Brohm was promoted to the program's head football coach, replacing Petrino. In their first season under Brohm and as members of Conference USA, WKU went 8–5. Highlights of the season include upsetting undefeated and No. 24 ranked Marshall, in Huntington, 67–66 in overtime (effectively starting a rivalry between the two schools) as well as winning the Popeyes Bahamas Bowl, their first FBS bowl win with a 49–48 victory over Central Michigan. Brohm is credited with developing leading quarterback Brandon Doughty who led the FBS in passing yards and passing touchdowns in 2014 with 4,830 yards and 49 touchdowns respectively. Doughty was named 2014 Sammy Baugh Trophy winner as well as 2014 Conference USA Most Valuable Player.

In 2015, Brohm led WKU to a ten-win regular season, highlighted by an undefeated conference record, WKU's first appearance in the top 25, and a Conference USA Championship beating Southern Miss 45–28. The Hilltoppers went on to defeat South Florida, who was coached by former Hilltopper quarterback and coach Willie Taggart, in the Miami Beach Bowl 45–35, ending the season with a 12–2 record and ranked 24th in the nation. Quarterback Brandon Doughty again led the FBS in passing yards with 5,055, and passing touchdowns with 48, but also led in pass completion percentage with 71.9 and total yards per play with 8.7. Doughty was named the C-USA Most Valuable Player for a second straight year becoming the first player in league history to win the award in back-to-back seasons. In 2016, Brohm led WKU to their second consecutive 10+ win season for the first time in school history and their second straight C-USA Football Championship title. WKU beat LaTech 58–44 in a revenge match becoming just the second team to repeat as C-USA champions in back-to-back years and the first team in C-USA to host the championship and win in back-to-back years.

On December 5, 2016, it was announced that Jeff Brohm would be leaving to take the head coach position at Purdue and that defensive coordinator Nick Holt would be filling in as interim head coach leading into their bowl game. Holt led the Hilltoppers to their 3rd straight bowl victory beating Memphis 51–31 in the Boca Raton Bowl finishing the season 11–3. In his three seasons as head coach Jeff Brohm posted an outstanding 30–10 record, 17–2 at home, and 20–5 against Conference USA opponents. With the bowl win under Coach Holt, that brought their total wins over three years to 31 becoming a dominant force in Conference USA and among the Group of Five.

=== Mike Sanford Jr. (2017–2018) ===
Leaving his job as offensive coordinator at Notre Dame, Mike Sanford returned to WKU, this time as head coach, after serving as quarterbacks coach under Willie Taggart in 2010. Sanford also served on the same coaching staff as Taggart under Jim Harbaugh at Stanford. During his first year at WKU, the team went 6–7, losing in the 2017 Cure Bowl to Georgia State, 27–17. After a string of losses to open the 2018 campaign, including a home loss to FCS-level Maine 31–28 (a game in which WKU had once held a 21–0 lead), WKU limped to a 3–9 finish. Despite winning their final two games, including a road upset of Louisiana Tech, WKU fired Mike Sanford on November 25, 2018. Mike Sanford finished his WKU tenure with a 9–16 record, and a 6–10 record against Conference USA opponents.

=== Tyson Helton (2019–present) ===
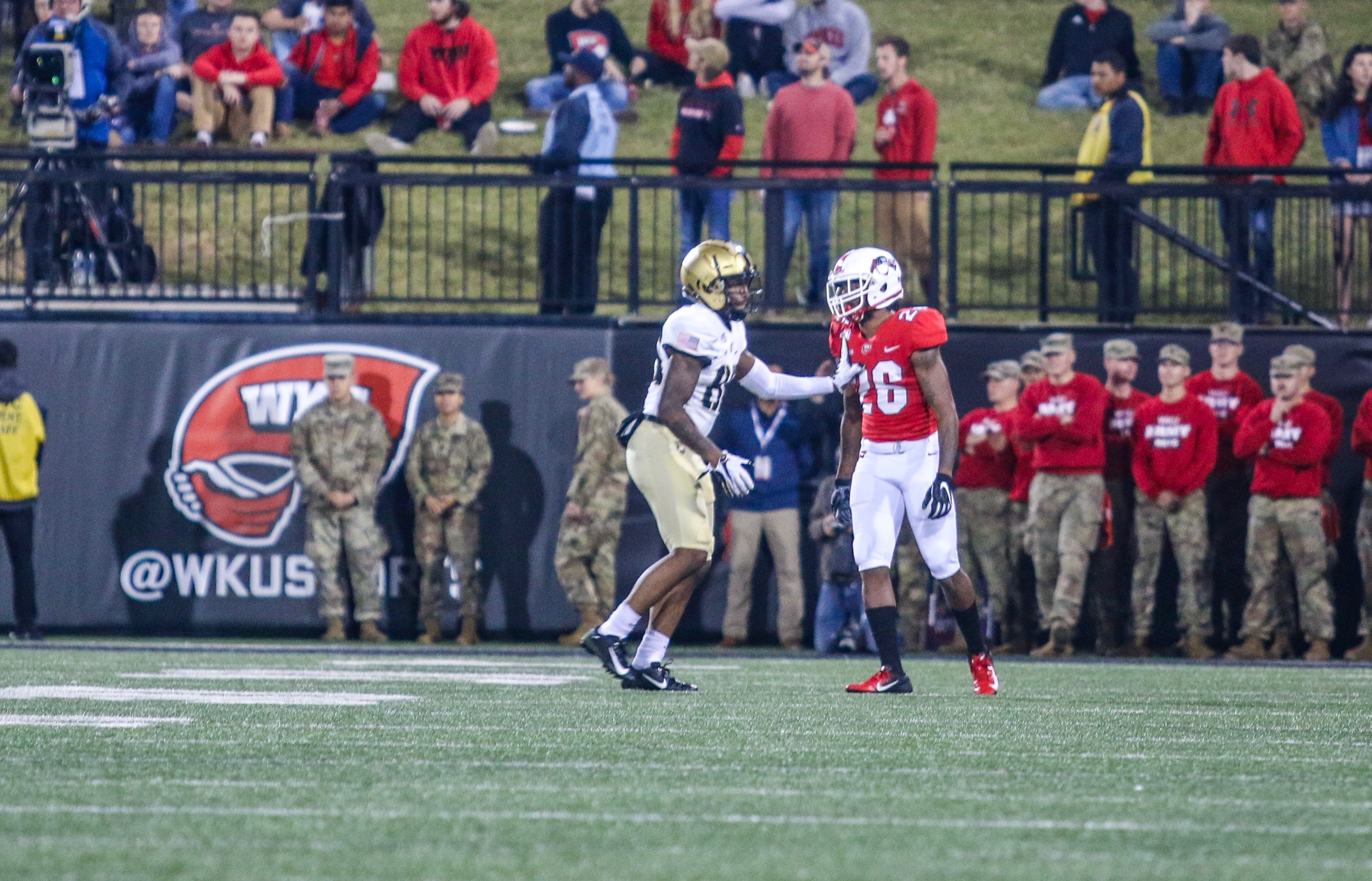
WK v Army game in 2019

On November 26, 2018, WKU announced the hire of Tennessee offensive coordinator Tyson Helton as the new Hilltoppers head coach. Helton came back to WKU after formerly holding the role of OC at WKU in 2014–2015 under Jeff Brohm before he was hired by his brother Clay Helton as the quarterbacks coach at USC.

In his first year as head coach, Helton was able to turn the program around and finished the season 8–4 including a statement 45–19 win over the Arkansas Razorbacks. In his first season, Helton won 2019 C-USA Coach of the Year. In addition to that honor, DeAngelo Malone won 2019 C-USA Defensive Player of the Year while Ty Storey won C-USA Newcomer of the Year. On December 8, WKU announced it would be accepting an invite to play in the SERVPRO First Responders Bowl in Dallas, TX against Western Michigan on December 30, 2019, and won 23–20. He won Western Kentucky the New Orleans Bowl in 2025.

== Conference affiliations ==
- 1913–1925: Independent
- 1926–1941: Southern Intercollegiate Athletic Association
- 1942–1947: Kentucky Intercollegiate Athletic Conference
- 1948–1981: Ohio Valley Conference
- 1982–1998: NCAA Division I-AA independent
- 1999–2000: Ohio Valley Conference
- 2001–2006: Gateway Football Conference
- 2007: NCAA Division I FCS independent
- 2008: NCAA Division I FBS independent
- 2009–2013: Sun Belt Conference
- 2014–present: Conference USA

== Head coaches ==
Western Kentucky has had 22 head coaches and two interim head coaches since it began play during the 1913 season. Since November 2018, Tyson Helton has served as head coach at Western Kentucky.

== Championships ==
=== National championships ===
WKU won the NCAA Division 1AA football national championship in 2002 and finished ranked number 1 in both final 1AA national polls that year. They were NCAA Division 2 national runners-up in 1973 and 1975.

Season	Selector	Coach	Record	Poll
2002	NCAA Division I-AA	Jack Harbaugh	12–3	1

=== Conference championships ===
Western Kentucky has won 13 conference titles, ten outright and three shared. They were an I-AA football independent from 1982 through 1998 and again in 2007 and 2008 while transitioning from FCS to FBS. Additionally, the 1928 team defeated all other Kentucky teams on its schedule and claimed to be state champions.

Year	Conference	Coach	Overall Record	Conference Record
1932	Southern Intercollegiate Athletic Association	Ernie Miller	7–1	6–0
1952†	Ohio Valley Conference	Jack Clayton	9–1	4–1
1963	Ohio Valley Conference	Nick Denes	10–0–1	7–0
1970	Ohio Valley Conference	Jimmy Feix	8–1–1	5–1-1
1971	Ohio Valley Conference	Jimmy Feix	8–2	6–1
1973	Ohio Valley Conference	Jimmy Feix	12–1	7–0
1975†	Ohio Valley Conference	Jimmy Feix	11–2	6–1
1978	Ohio Valley Conference	Jimmy Feix	8–2	6–0
1980	Ohio Valley Conference	Jimmy Feix	9–1	6–1
2000	Ohio Valley Conference	Jack Harbaugh	11–2	7–0
2002†	Gateway Football Conference	Jack Harbaugh	12–3	6–1
2015	Conference USA	Jeff Brohm	12–2	8–0
2016	Conference USA	Jeff Brohm	11–3	7–1

† Co-champions

=== Division championships ===
In addition to conference championships, Western Kentucky has won 3 conference divisional titles.

Season	Division	Coach	Opponent	Result
2015	Conference USA East	Jeff Brohm	Southern Miss	W 45–28
2016†	Conference USA East	Jeff Brohm	Louisiana Tech	W 58–44
2021	Conference USA East	Tyson Helton	UTSA	L 41–49

† Co-champions

== Bowl games ==
The Hilltoppers competed in two "College Division" bowl games prior to the NCAA instituting playoffs for lower division teams in 1973, with a record of 2–0.

Season	Coach	Bowl	Opponent	Result
1952	Jack Clayton	Refrigerator Bowl	Arkansas State	W 34–19
1963	Nick Denes	Tangerine Bowl	Coast Guard	W 27–0

WKU played in four bowl games that were part of the NCAA Division II postseason during the 1973 to 1977 timeframe, with a record of 2–2.

Season	Date	Coach	Bowl	Result	Opponent	Note
1973	December 8	Jimmy Feix	Grantland Rice Bowl	W 28–20	Grambling Tigers	Semifinal
1973	December 15	Jimmy Feix	Camellia Bowl	L 0–34	Louisiana Tech Bulldogs	Final
1975	December 6	Jimmy Feix	Grantland Rice Bowl	W 14–3	New Hampshire Wildcats	Semifinal
1975	December 13	Jimmy Feix	Camellia Bowl	L 14–16	Northern Michigan Wildcats	Final

In 2009 WKU completed its transition from Division I-AA/FCS to FBS. All bowl games since then have been at the NCAA Division I FBS level, with a record of 8–4.

Season	Coach	Bowl	Opponent	Result
2012	Lance Guidry (interim)	Little Caesars Pizza Bowl	Central Michigan	L 21–24
2014	Jeff Brohm	Bahamas Bowl	Central Michigan	W 49–48
2015	Jeff Brohm	Miami Beach Bowl	South Florida	W 45–35
2016	Nick Holt (interim)	Boca Raton Bowl	Memphis	W 51–31
2017	Mike Sanford Jr.	Cure Bowl	Georgia State	L 17–27
2019	Tyson Helton	First Responder Bowl	Western Michigan	W 23–20
2020	Tyson Helton	LendingTree Bowl	Georgia State	L 21–39
2021	Tyson Helton	Boca Raton Bowl	Appalachian State	W 59–38
2022	Tyson Helton	New Orleans Bowl	South Alabama	W 44–23
2023	Tyson Helton	Famous Toastery Bowl	Old Dominion	W 38–35 OT
2024	Tyson Helton	Boca Raton Bowl	James Madison	L 17–27
2025	Tyson Helton	New Orleans Bowl	Southern Miss	W 27–16

== NCAA Playoff appearances ==
The NCAA began Division II National Football Championship in 1973. WKU played in the NCAA Division II playoff championship game in 1973 and 1975. NCAA Division I-AA was formed for football in 1978, and WKU moved up from Division II to Division I-AA at that time, and all playoff appearances since then were at the Division I-AA level. WKU won the Division 1AA NCAA championship in 2002. In 2006 the name of Division I-AA was changed to NCAA Division I Football Championship Subdivision (FCS). In 2007, WKU initiated the transition to NCAA Division I Football Bowl Subdivision (FBS) and became ineligible for any further playoff appearances. The Hilltoppers' overall playoff record is 12–9.

Year	Record	Coach	Results
1973	12–1	Jimmy Feix	Lehigh W 25–16; Grambling W 28–20; Louisiana Tech L 34–0 (NCAA Runners-up)
1975	11–2	Jimmy Feix	N. Iowa W 14–12; New Hampshire W 14–3; N. Michigan L 16–14 (NCAA Runners-up)
1987	7–4	Dave Roberts	Eastern Kentucky L 40–17
1988	9–4	Dave Roberts	Western Illinois W 35–32; Eastern Kentucky L 41–24
1997	10–2	Jack Harbaugh	Eastern Kentucky W 42–14; Eastern Washington L 38–21
2000	11–2	Jack Harbaugh	Florida A&M W 27–0; Appalachian State L 17–14
2001	8–4	Jack Harbaugh	Furman L 24–20
2002	12–3	Jack Harbaugh	Murray St W 59–20; W. Illinois W 31–28; GA Southern W 31–28; McNeese St W 34–14 (NCAA Champions)
2003	9–4	David Elson	Jacksonville State W 45–7; Wofford L 34–17
2004	9–3	David Elson	Sam Houston State L 54–24

== Logos and uniforms ==
Traditionally, the logo for Western Kentucky athletics was a diagonal "WKU" lettering. The primary logo was switched in 2003 to a red towel with an embossed "WKU" wordmark in white. Red and white are the primary colors of the football uniforms. Historically, there has also been an occasional gray or black alternate uniform.

On August 13, 2016, WKU released 2 new (red home and white away) jerseys with 3 pants (red, white, and black.) The houndstooth design from legendary coach, Jimmy Feix's fedora is used on team shirts and down the stripe of the helmet. The university's cupola is inscribed on the chest plate and the line from the school's alma mater "We shall never fail thee" is written on the bottom of the jersey. On the pants, visibility of "Hilltoppers" lettering down the side of the pants increases with intensity of the game.

The Hilltoppers had a long relationship with Bowling Green-based Russell Athletic, which became the sports program's apperal outfitter in 2007 for all of their team uniforms as the contract was initially renewed through 2016, before the program switched and made Nike its official team outfitter the very next year, in 2017. The 2017 Nike brand official uniform reveal, which was hosted by DJ Khaled, included three full uniform sets: a red jersey with white pants and a chrome helmet, a white jersey with black pants and a chrome helmet, and an all white kit complete with the classic white helmet.

In 2023, the WKU football program introduced new Nike uniforms, which featured a new, larger but consistent and traditional striping pattern across the helmets (white, black and chrome), jerseys and pants, as well as drop shadow numbers. The football team's helmets added a metallic red facemask and larger "WKU" decals than before, including their primary towel logo and "Tops" script, which appears on two versions of the black and white helmets, which also appears on the pants.

== Hilltoppers in professional football ==
=== Current ===
Position	Name	Years	Team(s)	Drafted
TE	Tyler Higbee	2016–present	Rams	2016: 4th Rnd, 110th by LA
OT	George Fant	2016–present	Seahawks, Jets, Texans, Commanders	
LB	Joel Iyiegbuniwe	2018–present	Bears, Seahawks, Panthers, San Antonia Brahmas, Lions	2018: 4th Rnd, 115th by CHI
QB	Mike White	2018–present	Cowboys, Jets, Dolphins, Bills, Bengals, Panthers	2018: 5th Rnd, 171st by DAL
QB	Bailey Zappe	2022–present	Cleveland Browns	2022: 4th Rnd, 137th by NE
LB	DeAngelo Malone	2022–present	Falcons	2022: 3rd Rnd, 82nd by ATL
DL	Brodric Martin	2023–present	Lions, Chiefs, Steelers	2023: 3rd Rnd, 96th by DET
QB	Austin Reed	2024–present	Bears	
DB	Upton Stout	2025–present	49ers	2025: 3rd Rnd, 100th by SF

=== Former ===
Position	Name	Years	Team(s)	Drafted
E	Pete Marcus	1944	Commanders	
LB	Dale Lindsey	1965–1973	Browns, Saints	1965: 7th Rnd, 97th by CLE
RB	Clarence "Jazz" Jackson Jr.	1974–1976	Jets	1974: 16th Rnd, 395th by NYJ
DB	Virgil Livers	1975–1979	Bears	1975: 4th Rnd, 83rd by CHI
C/G	David Carter	1977–1985	Houston Oilers, Saints	1977: 6th Rnd, 165th by HOU
WR	Darryl Drake	1979, 1983	Commanders, Bengals	
DB	Davlin Mullen	1983–1986	Jets	1983: 8th Rnd, 217th by NYJ
DB	Carl Brazley	1987	San Diego Chargers	
LB	Paul Gray	1987	Falcons	1984: 10th Rnd, 264th by NO
G	Pete Walters	1987	Eagles	
WR	Keith Paskett	1987	Packers	
DE	Tim Mooney	1987	Eagles	
DB	Mark Johnson	1987	Bengals	
RB	Rod "He Hate Me" Smart	2001–2005	Eagles, Panthers	
CB	Joe Jefferson	2002–2005	Colts	2002: 3rd Rnd, 74th by IND
DB	Mel Mitchell	2002–2007	Saints, Patriots	2002: 5th Rnd, 150th by NO
LB	Sherrod Coates	2003–2004	Browns	
FB	Jeremi Johnson	2003–2009	Bengals	2003: 4th Rnd, 118th by CIN
WR	Bobby Sippio	2007	Chiefs	
G	Anthony Oakley	2005–2007	Bears	
RB	Bobby Rainey	2012–2017	Ravens, Browns, Buccaneers, Giants	
DE	Quanterus Smith	2013–2014	Broncos	2013: 5th Rnd, 146th by DEN
TE	Jack Doyle	2013–2021	Titans, Colts	
LB	Andrew Jackson	2014-2021	Colts, Spokane Shock (formerly Spokane Empire), Memphis Express, Houston Roughnecks, St. Louis Battlehawks, New Mexico Chupacabras (formerly Duke City Gladiators)	2014: 6th Rnd, 203rd by IND
TE	Mitchell Henry	2015-2016	Packers, Broncos, Ravens	
FS	Jonathan Dowling	2014–2016	Raiders (Oakland), Dolphins, Bills, Toronto Argonauts	2014: 7th Rnd, 247th by OAK
RB	Antonio Andrews	2014–2016	Titans	
CB	Prince Charles Iworah	2016–2024	49ers, Chiefs, Commanders, Falcons, Team 9, Montreal Alouettes, TSL Conquerors, Pittsburgh Maulers, St. Louis Battlehawks	2016: 7th Rnd, 249th by SF
QB	Brandon Doughty	2016–2018	Dolphins, Cardinals	2016: 7th Rnd, 223rd by MIA
OT	Darrell Williams Jr.	2017–2021	49ers, Rams, Ravens, Ottawa Redblacks	
G	Forrest Lamp	2017–2022	Seahawks, Bills, Saints	2017: 2nd Rnd, 38th by LAC
WR	Taywan Taylor	2017–2022	Titans, Browns, Texans, Breakers	2017: 3rd Rnd, 72nd by TEN
TE	Deon Yelder	2018–2023	Saints, Chiefs, Commanders, Titans, Buccaneers, Giants, Cardinals, San Antonio Brahmas	

== Notable Hilltopper players ==
- Romeo Crennel – former defensive coordinator for the Houston Texans, former head coach of the Kansas City Chiefs (2012), former head coach of the Cleveland Browns (2005–2008)
- Joe Bugel – former head coach of the Oakland Raiders (1997)
- Willie Taggart – current runningback coach for the Baltimore Ravens, former head coach of the FAU Owls, former head coach of the Florida State Seminoles, former head coach of the Oregon Ducks, former head coach of the South Florida Bulls, and former head coach of the Western Kentucky Hilltoppers (2010–2012). Played quarterback from 1995 to 1998.
- Eagle "Buddy" Keys – former head coach in the CFL, Grey Cup Champion, member of the Canadian Football Hall of Fame
- Rod Smart – former running back for the Carolina Panthers and Las Vegas Outlaws (XFL). More famously known by the nickname "He Hate Me".
- Jason Michael – Quarterback of 2002 National Championship team, former offensive coordinator for the Tennessee Titans
- Brandon Doughty – 2014 Sammy Baugh Award Winner and all-time passing leader at WKU
- George Fant – former Western Kentucky Hilltoppers basketball star and current offensive tackle for the Washington Commanders
- Mike White – quarterback for the Carolina Panthers
- Bailey Zappe – quarterback for the Cleveland Browns
- Tyler Higbee – tight end for the Los Angeles Rams

== Notable Hilltopper coaches ==
=== Head coaches ===
- L.T. Smith (1920–1921, head coach) – Namesake of L.T. Smith Stadium
- E.A. Diddle (1922–1928, head coach) – legendary Western Kentucky Hilltoppers basketball head coach, symbol behind for WKU's red towel logo, and namesake of E. A. Diddle Arena
- Nick Denes (1957–1967, head coach) – namesake of Nick Denes Field
- Jimmy Feix (1968–1983, head coach; 1957–1967, assistant coach; 1986–1991, athletic director) – Winningest coach in WKU history; 1973, 1978, and 1980 Ohio Valley Conference Coach of the Year; 1973 and 1975 NCAA Division II National Runners-up, and namesake of Feix Field in L.T. Smith Stadium.
- Jack Harbaugh (1989–2002, head coach) – 2000 Ohio Valley Conference Coach of the Year, 2002 AFCA Coach of the Year (FCS), 2002 FCS National Champion
- Bobby Petrino (2013) – Current Arkansas offensive coordinator. former coach at Missouri State, University of Louisville, University of Arkansas, and the NFL Atlanta Falcons spent 13 months as head coach at WKU before returning to Louisville in January 2014

=== Assistants ===
- Tommy Prothro (1942, assistant coach) – former head coach – Oregon State and UCLA, former head coach – Los Angeles Rams and San Diego Chargers, member of the College Football Hall of Fame
- Jerry Glanville (1967, defensive coordinator) – former NFL Head Coach of the Houston Oilers and the Atlanta Falcons
- Joe Bugel (1964–1968, assistant coach) – former NFL head coach for the Arizona Cardinals and Oakland Raiders
- Romeo Crennel (1970–1974, defensive line coach) – former NFL head coach for the Cleveland Browns and Kansas City Chiefs
- Jim Harbaugh (1994–2001, assistant coach) – former NFL head coach for the San Francisco 49ers and at the University of Michigan, now currently the head coach for the Los Angeles Chargers was a certified, unpaid assistant under his father while playing in the NFL
- Don Martindale – (2001–03, LB Coach, defensive coordinator) current linebackers coach for the Baltimore Ravens

== Retired jerseys ==
Western Kentucky has retired four jersey numbers.

Western Kentucky Hilltoppers retired jerseys
No.	Player	Pos.	Tenure	No. ret.
1	Willie Taggart	QB	1995–1998	1999
24	Virgil Livers	CB	1971–1974	2001
44	Dale Lindsey	LB	1963–1964	2007
66	Jimmy Feix	QB	1949–1952	1999

== Individual award winners ==
Award	Name	Year(s)
Ohio Valley Conference Coach of the Year	Nick Denes Jimmy Feix Jack Harbaugh	1963 1973, 1978, 1980 2000
Division I-AA AFCA Coach of the Year	Jack Harbaugh	2002
Gateway Football Conference Freshman of the Year	Justin Haddix	2003
Sun Belt Conference Player of the Year	Antonio Andrews	2013
Sun Belt Conference Offensive Player of the Year	Bobby Rainey Antonio Andrews	2010, 2011 2013
Sun Belt Conference Defensive Player of the Year	Quanterus Smith Xavius Boyd	2012 2013
Sammy Baugh Trophy Award Winner	Brandon Doughty	2014
Conference USA Most Valuable Player	Brandon Doughty	2014, 2015
Conference USA Defensive Player of the Year	DeAngelo Malone	2019
Conference USA Newcomer of the Year	Ty Storey	2019
Conference USA Coach of the Year	Tyson Helton	2019
Conference USA Most Valuable Player	Bailey Zappe	2021

== All-Americans ==
=== FBS ===
One player has been designated by the NCAA as an FBS "Consensus All-American" as of 2025.

Player	Position	Year
Cole Maynard	P	2025

=== FCS ===
25 players have been designated by the NCAA as FCS "Consensus All-Americans" for a total of 29 time (with four players having been selected twice) as of 2025.

Player	Position	Year
Dale Lindsey	LB	1964
Lawrence Brame	DE	1970
Mike McKoy	DB	1973
John Bushong	DL	1974
Virgil Livers	DB	1974
Rick Green	LB	1975
Chip Carpenter	OL	1977
Pete Walters	G	1980
Tim Ford	DL	1980
Donnie Evans	DL	1981
Paul Gray	LB	1982
Paul Gray	LB	1983
James Edwards	DB	1987
Dean Tiebout	OL	1988
Joe Arnold	RB	1988
Brian Bixler	C	1995
Patrick Goodman	OL	1997
Patrick Goodman	OL	1998
Bobby Sippio	DB	2000
Melvin Wisham	LB	2000
Erik Dandy	LB	2001
Mel Mitchell	DB	2001
Chris Price	OL	2002
Sherrod Coates	LB	2002
Buster Ashley	OL	2003
Matt Lange	PK	2003
Erik Dandy	LB	2003
Buster Ashley	OL	2004
Erik Losey	OL	2005

== Rivalries ==
WKU has several historic rivalries that stem from its time in the Ohio Valley Conference. Since WKU's transition to the Football Bowl Subdivision in 2007, two of these rivalry games are no longer played on an annual basis.

=== Middle Tennessee State ===
100 Miles of Hate is the name of the long-standing rivalry with Middle Tennessee. As WKU's oldest rivalry the two programs played together for several decades in the Ohio Valley Conference before both became members of the Sun Belt Conference and then transitioned to Conference USA about the same time. The name comes from the fact that the two universities are separated by about 100 miles.

Games played	First meeting	Last meeting	Win streak	Wins	Losses	Ties	Win %
73	1914, MTSU 47–0	2023, WKU 38–10	5, WKU (2019–2023)	37	35	1	.507

=== Eastern Kentucky ===
WKU has an inactive rivalry with Eastern Kentucky. The two programs have met 84 times in football since 1914. The rivalry has taken a hiatus since leaving EKU behind as WKU transitioned to FBS in 2009. The programs scheduled a one-game match-up in 2017 in which WKU won 31–17 in Bowling Green, Kentucky.

Games played	First meeting	Last meeting	Win streak	Wins	Losses	Ties	Win %
85	1914, EKU 34–6	2017, WKU 37–13	3, WKU (2007–2017)	47	35	3	.571

=== Murray State ===
WKU has an inactive rivalry with nearby Murray State. The two programs have met 67 times since the rivalry began in 1931. The Red Belt trophy was introduced to the rivalry series in 1978 when Murray's athletic trainer failed to pack a belt for the Racers' road trip and was loaned one by legendary WKU athletic trainer Bill "Doc E" Edwards.

Games played	First meeting	Last meeting	Win streak	Wins	Losses	Ties	Win %
67	1931, WKU 7–0	2008, WKU 50–9	4, WKU (1999–2008)	36	24	7	.589

=== Marshall ===
WKU has played Marshall University thirteen times, beginning in 1941 through 2021, with Marshall leading 8–5 in the series. The rivalry went into hiatus due to conference realignment but is scheduled to return as non-conference home and home series. The rivalry is slated to be resumed on September 13, 2031, in Bowling Green, Kentucky. The return trip is scheduled for September 18, 2032, in Huntington, West Virginia.

Games played	First meeting	Last meeting	Win streak	Wins	Losses	Ties	Win %
13	1941, Marshall 34–7	2017, Marshall 30–23	4, Marshall (2017–2020)	5	8	0	.385

== Future non-conference opponents ==
Announced schedules as of August 20, 2026.

2026	2027	2028	2029	2031	2032
at Nevada	Southern Illinois	Ball State	at Indiana	Marshall	at Marshall
at Georgia	at Ball State	at Miami (OH)		at South Florida	
at Indiana	at Oregon				
Mercyhurst	Miami (OH)				
