= Battle for the Red Belt =

American college football rivalry

- Murray State Racers Western Kentucky Hilltoppers
- First meeting: October 24, 1931; Western Kentucky, 7–0
- Latest meeting: September 20, 2008; Western Kentucky, 50–9
- Next meeting: TBD
- Trophy: Red Belt

Statistics
- Total meetings: 67
- All-time series: Western Kentucky leads, 36–24–7
- Largest victory: Western Kentucky 50, Murray State 0 (1963)
- Longest win streak: Western Kentucky, 5 (1969–1973)
- Current win streak: Western Kentucky, 4 (1999–present)

Locations of MSU and WKU

The Battle for the Red Belt is an American college football rivalry between the Western Kentucky Hilltoppers football team of Western Kentucky University and the Murray State Racers football team of Murray State University. The rivalry began as an in-conference rivalry within the Ohio Valley Conference (OVC), but both schools have since departed for other conferences. The Hilltoppers were the first to move, transitioning to the Football Bowl Subdivision and playing as an independent in the 2008 season before moving football to the Sun Belt Conference in 2009, (Note: WKU had been a Sun Belt Conference member in non-football sports since 1982.) followed by a move to Conference USA in 2014. The Racers, which remain in the Football Championship Subdivision to this day, played their final OVC season in 2022, and joined the Missouri Valley Football Conference in 2023. The rivalry has continued as a trophy game, although it is no longer played on an annual basis.

== History ==
The football rivalry between the Hilltoppers and the Racers dates to 1931. Western Kentucky secured a victory in the first game on October 24, 1931. In 1939, both institutions strengthened the rivalry by scheduling the match up as the final game of their regular seasons. This tradition continued, with only four interruptions, for the next 46 years.

Prior to the 1955 football game, a group of Western Kentucky students traveled to Murray and stole a banner commemorating Murray State's participation in the 1949 Tangerine Bowl. In response, a group of Murray State students traveled to Bowling Green with buckets of paint and plans to paint the Western Kentucky water tower that overlooked the football stadium. The plan was stopped when the Murray State students were forced off the water tower by a group Western Kentucky students with an ROTC training rifle. A "W" was shaved into the hair of three of the Murray State students, and their photo appeared in the local newspaper along with a photo of the Western Kentucky students displaying their stolen Murray State Tangerine Bowl banner. Murray State won the 1955 game 28–12, and the Tangerine Bowl banner was returned to Murray State. Following the Racer victory, a similar banner was stolen from Western Kentucky's W Club room. Over the next decade, the water tower and statue of Henry Hardin Cherry remained targets of Murray State students any time the schools met in both football and basketball. In another incident, the phrase "Murray OVC Champs" was painted on an overpass near the Western Kentucky campus.

The football rivalry was cemented as an annual trophy game in 1978 known as the Battle for the Red Belt. The Red Belt originated in 1978 when WKU athletic trainer Bill Edwards attended a district trainers' meeting in Atlanta with Murray State trainer Tom Simmons. Simmons forgot to bring a belt, and borrowed a red one from Edwards. After the meeting, Edwards asked for the return of his belt, but Simmons responded that WKU would have to battle Murray State in football to get it back. Simmons had the belt mounted on a large plaque with brass plates to record the annual game scores of the annual rivalry game. The annual meetings between the two teams ended in 2000, but the Battle for the Red Belt is still played on in intermittent basis. The last game was played in 2008 when a record crowd of 22,297 in Bowling Green watched the Hilltoppers beat the Racers 50–9 and maintain possession of the Red Belt. The Racers and Hilltoppers have met 67 times in football, with Western Kentucky leading the series 36–24–7.

== Game results ==
Murray State victories	Western Kentucky victories	Tie games

No.	Date	Location	Winner	Score
1	October 24, 1931	Bowling Green	Western Kentucky	7–0
2	October 22, 1932	Murray	Western Kentucky	6–0
3	October 14, 1933	Bowling Green	Murray State	20–6
4	November 17, 1934	Murray	Murray State	27–14
5	November 2, 1935	Bowling Green	Western Kentucky	21–6
6	November 21, 1936	Murray	Western Kentucky	14–0
7	November 20, 1937	Bowling Green	Tie	7–7
8	November 19, 1938	Murray	Western Kentucky	21–7
9	November 25, 1939	Bowling Green	Tie	12–12
10	November 23, 1940	Murray	Western Kentucky	6–0
11	November 20, 1941	Bowling Green	Tie	0–0
12	November 21, 1942	Murray	Western Kentucky	24–13
13	November 27, 1946	Bowling Green	Murray State	55–6
14	November 22, 1947	Murray	Murray State	21–0
15	November 25, 1948	Bowling Green	Murray State	34–7
16	November 19, 1949	Murray	Western Kentucky	10–7
17	November 19, 1950	Bowling Green	Tie	27–27
18	November 17, 1951	Murray	Murray State	23–6
19	November 22, 1952	Murray	Western Kentucky	12–7
20	November 21, 1953	Bowling Green	Western Kentucky	12–7
21	November 20, 1954	Murray	Murray State	19–0
22	November 19, 1955	Bowling Green	Murray State	28–12
23	November 17, 1956	Murray	Murray State	34–13
24	November 23, 1957	Bowling Green	Tie	7–7
25	November 22, 1958	Murray	Murray State	12–7
26	November 21, 1959	Bowling Green	Western Kentucky	21–6
27	November 12, 1960	Murray	Murray State	26–7
28	November 11, 1961	Bowling Green	Western Kentucky	14–6
29	November 10, 1962	Murray	Western Kentucky	16–15
30	November 23, 1963	Bowling Green	Western Kentucky	50–0
31	November 21, 1964	Murray	Murray State	14–7
32	November 20, 1965	Bowling Green	Tie	14–14
33	November 19, 1966	Murray	Western Kentucky	37–20
34	November 18, 1967	Bowling Green	Western Kentucky	42–19

No.	Date	Location	Winner	Score
35	November 23, 1968	Murray	Murray State	17–14
36	November 22, 1969	Bowling Green	Western Kentucky	59–14
37	November 21, 1970	Murray	Western Kentucky	33–7
38	November 20, 1971	Bowling Green	Western Kentucky	24–10
39	November 18, 1972	Murray	Western Kentucky	17–6
40	November 17, 1973	Bowling Green	Western Kentucky	32–27
41	November 23, 1974	Murray	Murray State	9–7
42	November 22, 1975	Bowling Green	Western Kentucky	19–0
43	November 20, 1976	Murray	Murray State	16–6
44	November 19, 1977	Bowling Green	Murray State	21–13
45	November 18, 1978	Murray	Western Kentucky	14–6
46	November 17, 1979	Bowling Green	Murray State	30–20
47	November 22, 1980	Murray	Murray State	49–0
48	November 21, 1981	Bowling Green	Murray State	38–6
49	November 20, 1982	Murray	Western Kentucky	27–20
50	November 19, 1983	Bowling Green	Murray State	7–3
51	November 17, 1984	Murray	Murray State	17–16
52	November 23, 1985	Bowling Green	Western Kentucky	27–25
53	September 27, 1986	Murray	Tie	10–10
54	September 19, 1987	Bowling Green	Western Kentucky	21–17
55	September 9, 1989	Murray	Murray State	17–14
56	September 14, 1991	Bowling Green	Western Kentucky	14–0
57	November 21, 1992	Murray	Western Kentucky	47–15
58	November 20, 1993	Bowling Green	Western Kentucky	44–14
59	September 8, 1994	Murray	Western Kentucky	39–13
60	August 31, 1995	Bowling Green	Murray State	35–14
61	September 7, 1996	Murray	Western Kentucky	44–41
62	September 6, 1997	Bowling Green	Western Kentucky	52–50
63	September 12, 1998	Murray	Murray State	36–31
64	October 2, 1999	Bowling Green	Western Kentucky	21–15
65	September 30, 2000	Murray	Western Kentucky	48–38
66	November 30, 2002	Bowling Green	Western Kentucky	59–20
67	September 20, 2008	Bowling Green	Western Kentucky	50–9
Series: Western Kentucky leads 36–24–7

== Notable games ==
=== 2000 ===
The 2000 game was final meeting between the Hilltoppers and Racers as both members of the Ohio Valley Conference. Keith Brooks rushed for a career-best 186 yards and three touchdowns Saturday, and DeWayne Gallishaw moved the ball for 118 yards on the ground to lead 24th-ranked Western Kentucky to a 48–38 OVC victory at Roy Stewart Stadium. Following the 2000 season, the Hilltoppers left the OVC as a result of a new OVC rule that required all eligible sports to participate in the conference. WKU was a football-only member of the OVC, and the university was not willing to move its other athletic programs back to the conference. Following the announcement, the head football coaches from both programs expressed the strong desire to keep the rivalry game on the schedule as an annual non-conference event.

=== 2002 ===
In 2002, WKU and Murray State met in the first round of the NCAA Division I-AA playoffs. The Hilltoppers beat the Racers 59–20 in front of 3,300 fans at L.T. Smith Stadium in Bowling Green. This was the first meeting between the two programs since WKU left the OVC to move to the Gateway Football Conference. The Hilltoppers went on to win their only NCAA Division I-AA National Championship.

== See also ==
- List of NCAA college football rivalry games
