= 2002 Prairie View A&M Panthers football team =

American college football season

2002 Prairie View A&M Panthers football
- Conference: Southwestern Athletic Conference
- West Division
- Record: 1–10 (0–7 SWAC)
- Head coach: Larry Dorsey (3rd season)
- Home stadium: Edward L. Blackshear Field

2002 Southwestern Athletic Conference football standings
	Conf.			Overall
Team	W		L	W		L
East Division
Alabama A&M xy	6	–	1	8	–	4
Jackson State	5	–	2	7	–	4
Alcorn State	3	–	4	6	–	5
Mississippi Valley State	3	–	4	5	–	6
Alabama State	2	–	5	6	–	6
West Division
No. 8 Grambling State xy$	6	–	1	11	–	2
Southern	5	–	2	6	–	6
Texas Southern	3	–	4	4	–	7
Arkansas–Pine Bluff	2	–	5	3	–	8
Prairie View A&M	0	–	7	1	–	10
Championship: Grambling State 31, Alabama A&M 19
$ – Conference champion; x – Division champion/co-champions; y – Championship game participant; Rankings from The Sports Network Poll

The 2002 Prairie View A&M Panthers football team represented Prairie View A&M University as a member of the Southwestern Athletic Conference (SWAC) during the 2002 NCAA Division I-AA football season. Led by third-year head coach Larry Dorsey, the Panthers compiled an overall record of 1–10, with a mark of 0–7 in conference play, and finished tied for third in the SWAC West Division.

== Schedule ==
Date	Opponent	Site	Result	Attendance	Source
August 31	at Texas Southern	Reliant Astrodome; Houston, TX (Labor Day Classic)	L 14–44		
September 7	at Tennessee State*	Adelphia Coliseum; Nashville, TN (John Merritt Classic)	L 8–41		
September 14	at Texas A&M–Kingsville*	Javelina Stadium; Kingsville, TX	L 0–65		
September 21	at Alabama A&M	Louis Crews Stadium; Normal, AL	L 12–15		
October 5	vs. No. 15 Grambling State	Cotton Bowl; Dallas, TX (rivalry)	L 13–35	42,622	
October 12	Alcorn State	Edward L. Blackshear Field; Prairie View, TX	L 13–33		
October 19	at Paul Quinn*	Dallas, TX	W 22–20		
October 26	Southern	Edward L. Blackshear Field; Prairie View, TX	L 24–46		
November 2	at Mississippi Valley State	Rice–Totten Stadium; Itta Bena, MS	L 8–26		
November 9	at Arkansas–Pine Bluff	Golden Lion Stadium; Pine Bluff, AR	L 0–44		
November 16	at Jackson State	Mississippi Veterans Memorial Stadium; Jackson, MS	L 9–44		
*Non-conference game; Rankings from The Sports Network Poll released prior to the game
