= 2002 Jackson State Tigers football team =

American college football season

2002 Jackson State Tigers football
- Conference: Southwestern Athletic Conference
- East Division
- Record: 7–4 (5–2 SWAC)
- Head coach: Judge Hughes (4th season)
- Home stadium: Mississippi Veterans Memorial Stadium

2002 Southwestern Athletic Conference football standings
	Conf.			Overall
Team	W		L	W		L
East Division
Alabama A&M xy	6	–	1	8	–	4
Jackson State	5	–	2	7	–	4
Alcorn State	3	–	4	6	–	5
Mississippi Valley State	3	–	4	5	–	6
Alabama State	2	–	5	6	–	6
West Division
No. 8 Grambling State xy$	6	–	1	11	–	2
Southern	5	–	2	6	–	6
Texas Southern	3	–	4	4	–	7
Arkansas–Pine Bluff	2	–	5	3	–	8
Prairie View A&M	0	–	7	1	–	10
Championship: Grambling State 31, Alabama A&M 19
$ – Conference champion; x – Division champion/co-champions; y – Championship game participant; Rankings from The Sports Network Poll

The 2002 Jackson State Tigers football team represented Jackson State University as a member of the Southwestern Athletic Conference (SWAC) during the 2002 NCAA Division I-AA football season. Led by fourth-year head coach Judge Hughes, the Tigers compiled an overall record of 7–4 and a mark of 5–2 in conference play, and finished second in the SWAC East Division.

== Schedule ==
Date	Opponent	Site	Result	Attendance	Source
August 31	at Southern Miss*	M. M. Roberts Stadium; Hattiesburg, MS	L 7–55	35,169	
September 7	at North Carolina A&T*	Aggie Stadium; Greensboro, NC	L 36–42	18,436	
September 14	vs. Tennessee State*	Liberty Bowl Memorial Stadium; Memphis, TN (Southern Heritage Classic)	W 31–28	38,496	
September 21	vs. Southern	Louisiana Superdome; New Orleans, LA (rivalry)	W 36–14	35,505	
September 28	Mississippi Valley State	Mississippi Veterans Memorial Stadium; Jackson, MS	W 36–12		
October 12	vs. Alabama State	Ladd–Peebles Stadium; Mobile, AL (Gulf Coast Classic)	L 24–20	13,293	
October 26	at No. 7 Grambling State	Eddie G. Robinson Memorial Stadium; Grambling, LA	L 31–52	9,462	
November 2	at Arkansas–Pine Bluff	Golden Lion Stadium; Pine Bluff, AR	W 42–0		
November 9	Alabama A&M	Mississippi Veterans Memorial Stadium; Jackson, MS	W 13–11	10,200	
November 16	Prairie View A&M	Mississippi Veterans Memorial Stadium; Jackson, MS	W 44–9		
November 23	Alcorn State	Mississippi Veterans Memorial Stadium; Jackson, MS (Capital City Classic)	W 34–20		
*Non-conference game; Rankings from The Sports Network Poll released prior to the game
