= Ed Argast =

American football coach and player (1956–2022)

Biographical details
- Born: May 18, 1956; Irvington, New York, U.S.
- Died: October 28, 2022 (aged 66); Harrison, New York, U.S.

Playing career
- 1975–1978: Colgate
- Position: Offensive tackle

Coaching career (HC unless noted)
- 1979–1980: Bates (assistant)
- 1981: Princeton (assistant)
- 1982–1987: Merchant Marine (OC/ST)
- 1988–1999: Colgate (OC/OL/DL)
- 2000–2002: Canisius
- 2003: Wagner (OC/QB)
- 2004–2005: Central Connecticut (OC)
- 2006–2008: Fordham (OC/OL)
- 2009–2013: Columbia (OL)
- 2014–2016: Bryant (OL)
- 2017–2019: New England (ME) (OC)
- 2020: Bates (OL)
- 2021: Bates (interim HC)

Head coaching record
- Overall: 6–34

Edward W. Argast (May 18, 1956 – October 28, 2022) was an American college football coach and player. He served as the head football coach at Canisius College from 2000 to 2002, compiling an overall record of 3–28 in three seasons. His tenure at Canisius ended abruptly when the college discontinued its football team at the end of the 2002 season. Argast was the interim head football coach at Bates College in Lewiston, Maine for one season, in 2021.

Argast served as an assistant football coach at Bates College from 1979 to 1980; Princeton University in 1981; the United States Merchant Marine Academy from 1982 to 1987; Colgate University from 1988 to 1999; Wagner College in 2003; Central Connecticut State University from 2004 to 2005; Fordham University from 2006 to 2008; Columbia University from 2009 to 2013; Bryant University from 2014 to 2016; and the University of New England from 2017 to 2019. Argast returned to Bates College in 2020 as the offensive line coach for what would have been the cancelled 2020 NCAA Division III football season, before being promoted to interim head coach at Bates for the 2021 season.

Argast graduated from Colgate University in 1978, where he played football and was a two-year starter at offensive tackle for the Colgate Raiders football team.

== Head coaching record ==
Year	Team	Overall	Conference	Standing	Bowl/playoffs
Canisius Golden Griffins (Metro Atlantic Athletic Conference) (2000–2002)
2000	Canisius	0–10	0–7	9th	
2001	Canisius	1–9	1–6	T–7th	
2002	Canisius	2–9	2–6	T–7th	
Canisius:		3–28	3–19		
Bates Bobcats (New England Small College Athletic Conference) (2021)
2021	Bates	3–6	3–6	T–7th	
Bates:		3–6	3–6		
Total:		6–34			
