= 2002 Norfolk State Spartans football team =

American college football season

2002 Norfolk State Spartans football
- Conference: Mid-Eastern Athletic Conference
- Record: 5–6 (2–6 MEAC)
- Head coach: Mo Forte (4th season)
- Home stadium: William "Dick" Price Stadium

2002 Mid-Eastern Athletic Conference football standings
	Conf.			Overall
Team	W		L	W		L
No. 15 Bethune–Cookman $^	7	–	1	11	–	2
Florida A&M	5	–	3	7	–	5
Hampton	5	–	3	7	–	5
Morgan State	5	–	3	7	–	5
South Carolina State	4	–	4	7	–	5
Howard	4	–	4	6	–	5
Norfolk State	2	–	6	5	–	6
North Carolina A&T	2	–	6	4	–	8
Delaware State	2	–	6	4	–	8
$ – Conference champion; ^ – NCAA Division I-AA playoff participant; Rankings from The Sports Network poll

The 2002 Norfolk State Spartans football team represented Norfolk State University as a member of the Mid-Eastern Athletic Conference (MEAC) during the 2002 NCAA Division I-AA football season. Led by fourth-year head coach Mo Forte, the Spartans compiled an overall record of 5–6, with a conference record of 2–6, and finished tied for seventh in the MEAC.

== Schedule ==
Date	Opponent	Site	Result	Attendance	Source
August 31	Virginia State*	William "Dick" Price Stadium; Norfolk, VA	W 31–21	8,363	
September 14	Savannah State*	William "Dick" Price Stadium; Norfolk, VA	W 35–6		
September 28	at No. 20 Bethune–Cookman	Municipal Stadium; Daytona Beach, FL	L 7–49		
October 5	at North Carolina A&T	Aggie Stadium; Greensboro, NC	L 10–36	12,535	
October 12	No. 25 South Carolina State	William "Dick" Price Stadium; Norfolk, VA	L 9–35	5,053	
October 19	at Hampton	Armstrong Stadium; Hampton, VA (rivalry)	L 14–31	18,232	
October 26	Florida A&M	William "Dick" Price Stadium; Norfolk, VA	L 31–34	6,287	
November 2	at Howard	William H. Greene Stadium; Washington, DC	L 0–21		
November 9	Morgan State	William "Dick" Price Stadium; Norfolk, VA	W 17–14		
November 16	Delaware State	William "Dick" Price Stadium; Norfolk, VA	W 23–20		
November 23	Morris Brown*	William "Dick" Price Stadium; Norfolk, VA	W 32–19		
*Non-conference game; Rankings from The Sports Network Poll released prior to the game
