= 2002 Saint Francis Red Flash football team =

American college football season

2002 Saint Francis Red Flash football
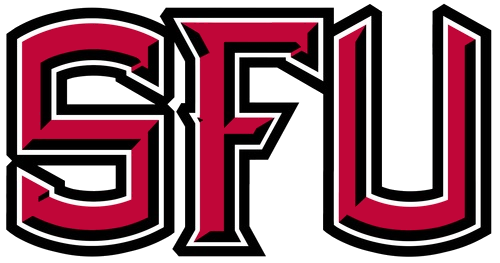
- Conference: Northeast Conference
- Record: 2–8 (1–6 NEC)
- Head coach: Dave Opfar (1st season)
- Home stadium: Pine Bowl

2002 Northeast Conference football standings
	Conf.			Overall
Team	W		L	W		L
Albany $	6	–	1	8	–	4
Stony Brook	5	–	2	8	–	2
Sacred Heart	5	–	2	7	–	3
Wagner	4	–	3	7	–	4
Central Connecticut State	3	–	4	5	–	6
Robert Morris	2	–	5	3	–	4
Monmouth	2	–	5	2	–	8
Saint Francis (PA)	1	–	6	2	–	8
$ – Conference champion

The 2002 Saint Francis Red Flash football team represented Saint Francis University as a member of the Northeast Conference (NEC) during the 2002 NCAA Division I-AA football season. The Red Flash were led by Dave Opfar in his first year as the program's 26th head coach. The team played its home games at the Pine Bowl. They finished the season 2–8 overall and 0–7 in NEC play to place last.

== Schedule ==
Date	Time	Opponent	Site	Result	Attendance
September 7	1:00 p.m.	Dayton*	Pine Bowl; Loretto, PA	L 0–39	1,311
September 14	1:00 p.m.	Saint Peter's*	Pine Bowl; Loretto, PA	L 19–24	806
September 28	1:00 p.m.	Sacred Heart	Pine Bowl; Loretto, PA	L 0–28	606
October 5	1:00 p.m.	Stony Brook	Pine Bowl; Loretto, PA	L 14–24	647
October 12	1:00 p.m.	at Central Connecticut State	Arute Field; New Britain, CT	L 10–28	543
October 19	1:00 p.m.	Wagner	Pine Bowl; Loretto, PA	L 0–7	352
October 26	1:00 p.m.	at Albany	University Field; Albany, NY	L 21–49	634
November 2	1:00 p.m.	at La Salle*	McCarthy Stadium; Philadelphia, PA	W 23–16	764
November 9	1:00 p.m.	at Monmouth	Kessler Field; West Long Branch, NJ	L 0–7	1,018
November 16		Robert Morris	Pine Bowl; Loretto, PA	W 14–7 ^{OT}	707
*Non-conference game; All times are in Eastern time
