= 2002 Morgan State Bears football team =

American college football season

2002 Morgan State Bears football
- Conference: Mid-Eastern Athletic Conference
- Record: 7–5 (5–3 MEAC)
- Head coach: Donald Hill-Eley (1st season)
- Home stadium: Hughes Stadium

2002 Mid-Eastern Athletic Conference football standings
	Conf.			Overall
Team	W		L	W		L
No. 15 Bethune–Cookman $^	7	–	1	11	–	2
Florida A&M	5	–	3	7	–	5
Hampton	5	–	3	7	–	5
Morgan State	5	–	3	7	–	5
South Carolina State	4	–	4	7	–	5
Howard	4	–	4	6	–	5
Norfolk State	2	–	6	5	–	6
North Carolina A&T	2	–	6	4	–	8
Delaware State	2	–	6	4	–	8
$ – Conference champion; ^ – NCAA Division I-AA playoff participant; Rankings from The Sports Network poll

The 2002 Morgan State Bears football team represented Morgan State University as a member of the Mid-Eastern Athletic Conference (MEAC) during the 2002 NCAA Division I-AA football season. Led by first-year head coach Donald Hill-Eley, the Bears compiled an overall record of 7–5, with a mark of 5–3 in conference play, and finished tied for second in the MEAC.

== Schedule ==
Date	Opponent	Site	Result	Attendance	Source
August 31	at Gardner–Webb*	Ernest W. Spangler Stadium; Boiling Springs, NC	L 24–28	2,567	
September 5	at Towson*	Towson University Stadium; Towson, MD (rivalry)	L 28–49	8,517	
September 14	vs. No. 19 Florida A&M	Paul Brown Stadium; Cincinnati, OH (P&G River Front Classic)	L 16–34	23,619	
September 21	Monmouth*	Hughes Stadium; Baltimore, MD	W 35–20	6,013	
October 5	No. 19 Bethune–Cookman	Hughes Stadium; Baltimore, MD	L 27–49		
October 12	at North Carolina A&T	Aggie Stadium; Greensboro, NC	W 30–13	30,305	
October 19	at Howard	William H. Greene Stadium; Washington, DC (rivalry)	W 38–20	13,500	
October 26	Delaware State^{†}	Hughes Stadium; Baltimore, MD	W 35–28 ^{OT}	14,236	
November 2	Morris Brown*	Hughes Stadium; Baltimore, MD	W 42–41 ^{2OT}	1,031	
November 9	at Norfolk State	William "Dick" Price Stadium; Norfolk, VA	L 14–17		
November 16	at South Carolina State	Oliver C. Dawson Stadium; Orangeburg, SC	W 23–12		
November 23	Hampton	Hughes Stadium; Baltimore, MD	W 52–42	4,362	
*Non-conference game; ^{†}Homecoming; Rankings from The Sports Network Poll released prior to the game
