= 2002 Tennessee State Tigers football team =

American college football season

2002 Tennessee State Tigers football
- Conference: Ohio Valley Conference
- Record: 2–10 (1–5 OVC)
- Head coach: James Reese (3rd season)
- Home stadium: The Coliseum

2002 Ohio Valley Conference football standings
	Conf.			Overall
Team	W		L	W		L
No. 13 Eastern Illinois +^	5	–	1	8	–	4
No. 20 Murray State +^	5	–	1	7	–	5
No. 21 Eastern Kentucky	4	–	2	8	–	4
No. 24 Southeast Missouri State	4	–	2	8	–	4
Tennessee Tech	2	–	4	5	–	7
Tennessee State	1	–	5	2	–	10
Tennessee–Martin	0	–	6	2	–	10
+ – Conference co-champions; ^ – NCAA Division I-AA playoff participant; Rankings from The Sports Network poll

The 2002 Tennessee State Tigers football team represented Tennessee State University as a member of the Ohio Valley Conference (OVC) during the 2002 NCAA Division I-AA football season. Led by third-year head coach James Reese, the Tigers compiled an overall record of 2–10, with a conference record of 1–5, and finished sixth in the OVC.

== Schedule ==
Date	Opponent	Site	Result	Attendance	Source
August 31	at South Carolina State*	Oliver C. Dawson Stadium; Orangeburg, SC	L 20–26	8,741	
September 7	Prairie View A&M*	The Coliseum; Nashville, TN (John Merritt Classic)	W 41–8		
September 14	vs. Jackson State*	Liberty Bowl Memorial Stadium; Memphis, TN (Southern Heritage Classic)	L 28–31	38,496	
September 22	vs. No. 16 Grambling State*	Sam Boyd Stadium; Whitney, NV (Silver Dollar Classic)	L 14–49	22,537	
September 28	vs. No. 11 Florida A&M*	Georgia Dome; Atlanta, GA (Atlanta Football Classic)	L 24–37	67,167	
October 5	at Southeast Missouri State	Houck Stadium; Cape Girardeau, MO	L 25–49	8,135	
October 12	at Alabama A&M*	Louis Crews Stadium; Normal, AL	L 21–25	16,162	
October 26	Tennessee–Martin^{†}	The Coliseum; Nashville, TN	W 26–8	22,438	
November 2	No. 6 Eastern Illinois	The Coliseum; Nashville, TN	L 48–54	7,216	
November 9	at Murray State	Roy Stewart Stadium; Murray, KY	L 27–51	3,774	
November 16	Tennessee Tech	The Coliseum; Nashville, TN	L 14–20	4,217	
November 21	No. 22 Eastern Kentucky	The Coliseum; Nashville, TN	L 20–45	2,349	
*Non-conference game; ^{†}Homecoming; Rankings from The Sports Network Poll released prior to the game
