= 2002 Texas Southern Tigers football team =

American college football season

2002 Texas Southern Tigers football
- Conference: Southwestern Athletic Conference
- West Division
- Record: 4–7 (3–4 SWAC)
- Head coach: William A. Thomas (9th season)
- Home stadium: Reliant Astrodome; Robertson Stadium

2002 Southwestern Athletic Conference football standings
	Conf.			Overall
Team	W		L	W		L
East Division
Alabama A&M xy	6	–	1	8	–	4
Jackson State	5	–	2	7	–	4
Alcorn State	3	–	4	6	–	5
Mississippi Valley State	3	–	4	5	–	6
Alabama State	2	–	5	6	–	6
West Division
No. 8 Grambling State xy$	6	–	1	11	–	2
Southern	5	–	2	6	–	6
Texas Southern	3	–	4	4	–	7
Arkansas–Pine Bluff	2	–	5	3	–	8
Prairie View A&M	0	–	7	1	–	10
Championship: Grambling State 31, Alabama A&M 19
$ – Conference champion; x – Division champion/co-champions; y – Championship game participant; Rankings from The Sports Network Poll

The 2002 Texas Southern Tigers football team represented Texas Southern University as a member of the Southwestern Athletic Conference (SWAC) during the 2002 NCAA Division I-AA football season. Led by ninth-year head coach William A. Thomas, the Tigers compiled an overall record of 4–7, with a mark of 3–4 in conference play, and finished third in the West Division of the SWAC.

== Schedule ==
Date	Opponent	Site	Result	Attendance	Source
August 31	Prairie View A&M	Reliant Astrodome; Houston, TX (Labor Day Classic)	W 44–14		
September 7	at Howard*	William H. Greene Stadium; Washington, DC	L 31–34		
September 14	at Alabama State	Cramton Bowl; Montgomery, AL	L 32–43		
September 21	at Southwest Texas State*	Bobcat Stadium; San Marcos, TX	L 10–17	13,075	
September 28	Alabama A&M	Robertson Stadium; Houston, TX	L 14–21		
October 12	Arkansas–Pine Bluff	Robertson Stadium; Houston, TX	W 42–20		
October 19	at Stillman*	Stillman Stadium; Tuscaloosa, AL	L 28–35		
October 26	Mississippi Valley State	Robertson Stadium; Houston, TX	W 34–21		
November 2	No. 7 Grambling State	Reliant Astrodome; Houston, TX	L 28–42	10,635	
November 9	Clark Atlanta*	Reliant Astrodome; Houston, TX	W 26–3		
November 16	at Southern	A. W. Mumford Stadium; Baton Rouge, LA	L 25–27		
*Non-conference game; Rankings from The Sports Network Poll released prior to the game
