= Dave Opfar =

American football player and coach (born 1960)

Biographical details
- Born: January 16, 1960; McKeesport, Pennsylvania, U.S.

Playing career
- 1979–1982: Penn State
- 1984–1985: Philadelphia/Baltimore Stars
- 1987: Pittsburgh Steelers
- Position: Nose tackle

Coaching career (HC unless noted)
- c. 1990: Duquesne HS (PA) (assistant)
- 1993–1997: Duquesne (DL)
- 1998: Penn State (GA)
- 1999–2001: Washington & Jefferson (DC)
- 2002–2009: Saint Francis (PA)
- 2010–2021: Duquesne (DC)

Head coaching record
- Overall: 17–68

Accomplishments and honors

Championships
- National (1982)

David Louis Opfar (born January 16, 1960) is an American football coach and former player. He was the defensive coordinator at Duquesne University from 2010 to 2021. Opfar served as the head football coach at Saint Francis University in Loretto, Pennsylvania from 2002 to 2009, compiling a record of 17–68. Opfar played college football at Penn State and professionally in the United States Football League (USFL) with the Philadelphia/Baltimore Stars in 1984 and 1985 and in the National Football League (NFL) with the Pittsburgh Steelers in 1987.

== Head coaching record ==
Year	Team	Overall	Conference	Standing	Bowl/playoffs
Saint Francis Red Flash (Northeast Conference) (2002–2009)
2002	Saint Francis	2–8	1–7	8th	
2003	Saint Francis	1–9	0–7	8th	
2004	Saint Francis	3–8	1–6	8th	
2005	Saint Francis	3–8	3–4	T–5th	
2006	Saint Francis	3–8	2–5	6th	
2007	Saint Francis	3–7	2–4	6th	
2008	Saint Francis	0–11	0–7	8th	
2009	Saint Francis	2–9	1–7	9th	
Saint Francis:		17–68	10–47		
Total:		17–68			
