= 2002 Mississippi Valley State Delta Devils football team =

American college football season

2002 Mississippi Valley State Delta Devils football
- Conference: Southwestern Athletic Conference
- East Division
- Record: 5–6 (3–4 SWAC)
- Head coach: Willie Totten (1st season)
- Defensive coordinator: Sam Washington (1st season)
- Home stadium: Rice–Totten Stadium

2002 Southwestern Athletic Conference football standings
	Conf.			Overall
Team	W		L	W		L
East Division
Alabama A&M xy	6	–	1	8	–	4
Jackson State	5	–	2	7	–	4
Alcorn State	3	–	4	6	–	5
Mississippi Valley State	3	–	4	5	–	6
Alabama State	2	–	5	6	–	6
West Division
No. 8 Grambling State xy$	6	–	1	11	–	2
Southern	5	–	2	6	–	6
Texas Southern	3	–	4	4	–	7
Arkansas–Pine Bluff	2	–	5	3	–	8
Prairie View A&M	0	–	7	1	–	10
Championship: Grambling State 31, Alabama A&M 19
$ – Conference champion; x – Division champion/co-champions; y – Championship game participant; Rankings from The Sports Network Poll

The 2002 Mississippi Valley State Delta Devils football team represented Mississippi Valley State University as a member of East Division of the Southwestern Athletic Conference (SwAC) during the 2002 NCAA Division I-AA football season. Led by first-year head coach Willie Totten, the played their home games at Rice–Totten Stadium in Itta Bena, Mississippi. Mississippi Valley State finished the season with an overall record of 5–6 and a mark of 3–4 in conference play, tying for third in the SWAC's East Division.

== Schedule ==
Date	Opponent	Site	Result	Source
September 7	Arkansas–Pine Bluff	Rice–Totten Stadium; Itta Bena, MS	L 30–36 ^{OT}	
September 14	Delta State*	Rice–Totten Stadium; Itta Bena, MS	W 28–26	
September 21	at Sam Houston State*	Bowers Stadium; Huntsville, TX	L 7–45	
September 28	at Jackson State	Mississippi Veterans Memorial Stadium; Jackson, MS	L 12–36	
October 5	Paul Quinn*	Rice–Totten Stadium; Itta Bena, MS	W 52–16	
October 12	at Southern	A. W. Mumford Stadium; Baton Rouge, LA	L 16–19	
October 19	at Alabama A&M	Louis Crews Stadium; Normal, AL	L 13–24	
October 26	at Texas Southern	Robertson Stadium; Houston, TX	L 21–34	
November 2	Prairie View A&M	Rice–Totten Stadium; Itta Bena, MS	W 26–8	
November 9	Alcorn State	Rice–Totten Stadium; Itta Bena, MS	W 23–6	
November 16	at Alabama State	Cramton Bowl; Montgomery, AL	W 13–10	
*Non-conference game
