= 2002 Southern Jaguars football team =

American college football season

2002 Southern Jaguars football
- Conference: Southwestern Athletic Conference
- West Division
- Record: 6–6 (5–2 SWAC)
- Head coach: Pete Richardson (10th season)
- Defensive coordinator: Terrence Graves (3rd season)
- Home stadium: A. W. Mumford Stadium

2002 Southwestern Athletic Conference football standings
	Conf.			Overall
Team	W		L	W		L
East Division
Alabama A&M xy	6	–	1	8	–	4
Jackson State	5	–	2	7	–	4
Alcorn State	3	–	4	6	–	5
Mississippi Valley State	3	–	4	5	–	6
Alabama State	2	–	5	6	–	6
West Division
No. 8 Grambling State xy$	6	–	1	11	–	2
Southern	5	–	2	6	–	6
Texas Southern	3	–	4	4	–	7
Arkansas–Pine Bluff	2	–	5	3	–	8
Prairie View A&M	0	–	7	1	–	10
Championship: Grambling State 31, Alabama A&M 19
$ – Conference champion; x – Division champion/co-champions; y – Championship game participant; Rankings from The Sports Network Poll

The 2002 Southern Jaguars football team represented Southern University as a member of the Southwestern Athletic Conference (SWAC) during the 2002 NCAA Division I-AA football season. Led by tenth-year head coach Pete Richardson, the Jaguars compiled an overall record of 6–6, with a conference record of 5–2, and finished second in the SWAC West Division.

== Schedule ==
Date	Opponent	Site	Result	Attendance	Source
August 31	at Tulane*	Louisiana Superdome; New Orleans, LA	L 19–37	40,337	
September 7	vs. No. 16 Northwestern State*	Independence Stadium; Shreveport, LA (Port City Classic)	L 20–30	23,572	
September 14	at Arkansas–Pine Bluff	Golden Lion Stadium; Pine Bluff, AR	W 14–13		
September 21	vs. Jackson State	Louisiana Superdome; New Orleans, LA (rivalry)	L 14–36	35,505	
September 28	at Nicholls State*	A. W. Mumford Stadium; Baton Rouge, LA	L 13–21	17,863	
October 5	vs. Alabama A&M	RCA Dome; Indianapolis, IN (Circle City Classic)	L 11–27	47,598	
October 12	Mississippi Valley State	A. W. Mumford Stadium; Baton Rouge, LA	W 19–16		
October 26	at Prairie View A&M	Edward L. Blackshear Field; Prairie View, TX	W 46–24		
November 2	Alcorn State	A. W. Mumford Stadium; Baton Rouge, LA	L 20–22		
November 9	Miles*	A. W. Mumford Stadium; Baton Rouge, LA	W 28–21		
November 16	Texas Southern	A. W. Mumford Stadium; Baton Rouge, LA	W 27–25		
November 30	vs. No. 4 Grambling State	Louisiana Superdome; New Orleans, LA (Bayou Classic)	W 48–24	59,725	
*Non-conference game; Rankings from The Sports Network Poll released prior to the game
