= 2002 Delaware State Hornets football team =

American college football season

2002 Delaware State Hornets football
- Conference: Mid-Eastern Athletic Conference
- Record: 4–8 (2–6 MEAC)
- Head coach: Ben Blacknall (3rd season)
- Home stadium: Alumni Stadium

2002 Mid-Eastern Athletic Conference football standings
	Conf.			Overall
Team	W		L	W		L
No. 15 Bethune–Cookman $^	7	–	1	11	–	2
Florida A&M	5	–	3	7	–	5
Hampton	5	–	3	7	–	5
Morgan State	5	–	3	7	–	5
South Carolina State	4	–	4	7	–	5
Howard	4	–	4	6	–	5
Norfolk State	2	–	6	5	–	6
North Carolina A&T	2	–	6	4	–	8
Delaware State	2	–	6	4	–	8
$ – Conference champion; ^ – NCAA Division I-AA playoff participant; Rankings from The Sports Network poll

The 2002 Delaware State Hornets football team represented Delaware State University as a member of the Mid-Eastern Athletic Conference (MEAC) during the 2002 NCAA Division I-AA football season. Led by third-year head coach Ben Blacknall, the Hornets compiled an overall record of 4–8, with a mark of 2–6 in conference play, and finished tied for seventh in the MEAC.

== Schedule ==
Date	Opponent	Site	Result	Attendance	Source
August 31	at Morris Brown*	Herndon Stadium; Atlanta, GA	W 16–10		
September 7	Savannah State*	Alumni Stadium; Dover, DE	W 41–9		
September 14	No. 13 Northwestern State*	Alumni Stadium; Dover, DE	L 14–34	3,850	
September 21	No. 15 Florida A&M	Alumni Stadium; Dover, DE	L 18–20	4,135	
September 28	at Bucknell*	Christy Mathewson–Memorial Stadium; Lewisburg, PA	L 13–27	3,024	
October 5	Hampton	Alumni Stadium; Dover, DE	L 13–44	5,139	
October 12	at No. 15 Bethune–Cookman	Municipal Stadium; Daytona Beach, FL	L 7–49	16,891	
October 26	at Morgan State	Hughes Stadium; Baltimore, MD	L 28–35 ^{OT}	14,236	
November 2	No. 21 South Carolina State	Alumni Stadium; Dover, DE	W 27–21	5,182	
November 9	North Carolina A&T	Alumni Stadium; Dover, DE	L 7–34		
November 16	at Norfolk State	William "Dick" Price Stadium; Norfolk, VA	L 20–23		
November 23	at Howard	William H. Greene Stadium; Washington, DC	W 14–7		
*Non-conference game; Rankings from The Sports Network Poll released prior to the game
