= 2002 North Carolina A&T Aggies football team =

American college football season

2002 North Carolina A&T Aggies football
- Conference: Mid-Eastern Athletic Conference
- Record: 4–8 (2–6 MEAC)
- Head coach: Bill Hayes (15th season)
- Home stadium: Aggie Stadium

2002 Mid-Eastern Athletic Conference football standings
	Conf.			Overall
Team	W		L	W		L
No. 15 Bethune–Cookman $^	7	–	1	11	–	2
Florida A&M	5	–	3	7	–	5
Hampton	5	–	3	7	–	5
Morgan State	5	–	3	7	–	5
South Carolina State	4	–	4	7	–	5
Howard	4	–	4	6	–	5
Norfolk State	2	–	6	5	–	6
North Carolina A&T	2	–	6	4	–	8
Delaware State	2	–	6	4	–	8
$ – Conference champion; ^ – NCAA Division I-AA playoff participant; Rankings from The Sports Network poll

The 2002 North Carolina A&T Aggies football team represented North Carolina A&T State University as a member of the Mid-Eastern Athletic Conference (MEAC) during the 2002 NCAA Division I-AA football season. Led by 15th-year head coach Bill Hayes, the Aggies compiled an overall record of 4–8, with a mark of 2–6 in conference play, and finished tied for seventh in the MEAC.

== Schedule ==
Date	Opponent	Site	Result	Attendance	Source
September 1	vs. North Carolina Central*	Carter–Finley Stadium; Raleigh, NC (rivalry)	L 30–33	25,027	
September 7	Jackson State*	Aggie Stadium; Greensboro, NC	W 42–36	18,436	
September 14	at No. 10 Portland State*	PGE Park; Portland, OR (Vanport Classic)	L 20–23 ^{OT}	10,012	
September 28	Elon*	Aggie Stadium; Greensboro, NC	W 34–20	17,349	
October 5	Norfolk State	Aggie Stadium; Greensboro, NC	W 36–10	12,535	
October 12	Morgan State^{†}	Aggie Stadium; Greensboro, NC	L 13–30	30,305	
October 19	at Florida A&M	Bragg Memorial Stadium; Tallahassee, FL	L 28–36	10,493	
October 26	at Howard	William H. Greene Stadium; Washington, DC	L 16–20	3,250	
November 2	No. 10 Bethune–Cookman	Aggie Stadium; Greensboro, NC	L 12–13	5,363	
November 9	at Delaware State	Alumni Stadium; Dover, DE	W 34–7		
November 16	at Hampton	Armstrong Stadium; Hampton, VA	L 7–17	2,350	
November 23	vs. South Carolina State	Georgia Dome; Atlanta, GA (Peach State Classic, rivalry)	L 9–26	34,261	
*Non-conference game; ^{†}Homecoming; Rankings from The Sports Network Poll released prior to the game
