= 2002 Howard Bison football team =

American college football season

2002 Howard Bison football
- Conference: Mid-Eastern Athletic Conference
- Record: 6–5 (4–4 MEAC)
- Head coach: Rayford Petty (1st season)
- Home stadium: William H. Greene Stadium

2002 Mid-Eastern Athletic Conference football standings
	Conf.			Overall
Team	W		L	W		L
No. 15 Bethune–Cookman $^	7	–	1	11	–	2
Florida A&M	5	–	3	7	–	5
Hampton	5	–	3	7	–	5
Morgan State	5	–	3	7	–	5
South Carolina State	4	–	4	7	–	5
Howard	4	–	4	6	–	5
Norfolk State	2	–	6	5	–	6
North Carolina A&T	2	–	6	4	–	8
Delaware State	2	–	6	4	–	8
$ – Conference champion; ^ – NCAA Division I-AA playoff participant; Rankings from The Sports Network poll

The 2002 Howard Bison football team represented Howard University as a member of the Mid-Eastern Athletic Conference (MEAC) during the 2002 NCAA Division I-AA football season. Led by first-year head coach Rayford Petty, the Bison compiled an overall record of 6–5, with a conference record of 4–4, and finished tied for fifth in the MEAC.

== Schedule ==
Date	Opponent	Site	Result	Attendance	Source
September 7	Texas Southern*	William H. Greene Stadium; Washington, DC	W 34–31		
September 14	at Hampton	Armstrong Stadium; Hampton, VA (rivalry)	L 2–51	19,021	
September 21	No. 4 Maine*	William H. Greene Stadium; Washington, DC	L 12–42	2,518	
September 28	at Morris Brown*	Herndon Stadium; Atlanta, GA	W 49–15		
October 12	at No. 21 Florida A&M	Bragg Memorial Stadium; Tallahassee, FL	W 28–24	16,216	
October 19	Morgan State	William H. Greene Stadium; Washington, DC (rivalry)	L 20–38	13,500	
October 26	North Carolina A&T	William H. Greene Stadium; Washington, DC	W 20–16	3,250	
November 2	Norfolk State	William H. Greene Stadium; Washington, DC	W 21–0		
November 9	at South Carolina State	Oliver C. Dawson Stadium; Orangeburg, SC	W 23–9	5,054	
November 16	at No. 13 Bethune–Cookman	Municipal Stadium; Daytona Beach, FL	L 27–46	5,497	
November 23	Delaware State	William H. Greene Stadium; Washington, DC	L 7–14		
*Non-conference game; Rankings from The Sports Network Poll released prior to the game
