= 2002 Arkansas–Pine Bluff Golden Lions football team =

American college football season

2002 Arkansas–Pine Bluff Golden Lions football
- Conference: Southwestern Athletic Conference
- West Division
- Record: 3–8 (3–4 SWAC)
- Head coach: Lee Hardman (10th season)
- Home stadium: Golden Lion Stadium

2002 Southwestern Athletic Conference football standings
	Conf.			Overall
Team	W		L	W		L
East Division
Alabama A&M xy	6	–	1	8	–	4
Jackson State	5	–	2	7	–	4
Alcorn State	3	–	4	6	–	5
Mississippi Valley State	3	–	4	5	–	6
Alabama State	2	–	5	6	–	6
West Division
No. 8 Grambling State xy$	6	–	1	11	–	2
Southern	5	–	2	6	–	6
Texas Southern	3	–	4	4	–	7
Arkansas–Pine Bluff	2	–	5	3	–	8
Prairie View A&M	0	–	7	1	–	10
Championship: Grambling State 31, Alabama A&M 19
$ – Conference champion; x – Division champion/co-champions; y – Championship game participant; Rankings from The Sports Network Poll

The 2002 Arkansas–Pine Bluff Golden Lions football team represented the University of Arkansas at Pine Bluff as a member of the Southwestern Athletic Conference (SWAC) during the 2002 NCAA Division I-AA football season. Led by tenth-year head coach Lee Hardman, the Golden Lions compiled an overall record of 3–8, with a mark of 3–4 in conference play, and finished fourth in the SWAC West Division.

== Schedule ==
Date	Opponent	Site	Result	Attendance	Source
August 31	at Alcorn State	Jack Spinks Stadium; Lorman, MS	L 24–34		
September 7	at Mississippi Valley State	Rice–Totten Stadium; Itta Bena, MS	W 36–30 ^{OT}		
September 14	Southern	Golden Lion Stadium; Pine Bluff, AR	L 13–14		
September 21	at No. 25 Alabama State	Cramton Bowl; Montgomery, AL	W 32–26		
September 28	vs. Kentucky State*	Edward Jones Dome; St. Louis, MO (Gateway Classic)	L 44–47 ^{4OT}		
October 12	at Texas Southern	Robertson Stadium; Houston, TX	L 20–42		
October 19	vs. No. 9 Grambling State	Independence Stadium; Shreveport, LA (Red River Classic)	L 15–54	11,017	
November 2	Jackson State	Golden Lion Stadium; Pine Bluff, AR	L 0–42		
November 9	Prairie View A&M	Golden Lion Stadium; Pine Bluff, AR	W 44–0		
November 16	Lane*	Golden Lion Stadium; Pine Bluff, AR	L 37–40		
November 23	Alabama A&M	Golden Lion Stadium; Pine Bluff, AR	L 19–39		
*Non-conference game; Rankings from The Sports Network Poll released prior to the game
