= 2002 Rhode Island Rams football team =

American college football season

2002 Rhode Island Rams football
- Conference: Atlantic 10 Conference
- Record: 3–9 (1–8 A-10)
- Head coach: Tim Stowers (3rd season)
- Offensive coordinator: Harold Nichols (3rd season)
- Home stadium: Meade Stadium

2002 Atlantic 10 Conference football standings
	Conf.			Overall
Team	W		L	W		L
No. 6 Maine $^	7	–	2	11	–	3
No. 11 Northeastern $^	7	–	2	10	–	3
No. 4 Villanova ^	6	–	3	11	–	4
UMass	6	–	3	8	–	4
William & Mary	5	–	4	6	–	5
Richmond	4	–	5	4	–	7
Delaware	4	–	5	6	–	6
Hofstra	4	–	5	6	–	6
James Madison	4	–	6	5	–	7
New Hampshire	2	–	7	3	–	8
Rhode Island	1	–	8	3	–	9
+ – Conference co-champions; ^ – NCAA Division I-AA playoff participant; Rankings from The Sports Network poll

The 2002 Rhode Island Rams football team was an American football team that represented the University of Rhode Island in the Atlantic 10 Conference during the 2002 NCAA Division I-AA football season. In their third season under head coach Tim Stowers, the Rams compiled a 3–9 record (1–8 against conference opponents) and finished last out of eleven teams in the conference.

== Schedule ==
Date	Opponent	Site	Result	Attendance	Source
August 31	Bryant*	Meade Stadium; Kingston, RI	W 28–0	3,346	
September 7	at No. 20 Hofstra	James M. Shuart Stadium; Hempstead, NY	L 19–37	3,333	
September 14	at Syracuse*	Carrier Dome; Syracuse, NY	L 17–63	43,089	
September 28	at No. 3 Maine	Alfond Stadium; Orono, ME	L 14–31	7,034	
October 5	Brown*	Meade Stadium; Kingston, RI (rivalry)	W 38–28	3,990	
October 12	at No. 20 Northeastern	Parsons Field; Brookline, MA	L 13–38	1,004	
October 19	Delaware^{†}	Meade Stadium; Kingston, RI	W 17–14 ^{2OT}	5,791	
October 26	Richmond	Meade Stadium; Kingston, RI	L 0–26	1,451	
November 2	James Madison	Meade Stadium; Kingston, RI	L 11–15	3,966	
November 9	at No. 20 William & Mary	Zable Stadium; Williamsburg, VA	L 6–44	5,502	
November 16	at No. 14 Villanova	Villanova Stadium; Villanova, PA	L 3–45	5,019	
November 23	UMass	Meade Stadium; Kingston, RI	L 21–48	2,501	
*Non-conference game; ^{†}Homecoming; Rankings from The Sports Network Poll released prior to the game
