= 2002 New Hampshire Wildcats football team =

American college football season

2002 New Hampshire Wildcats football
- Conference: Atlantic 10 Conference
- Record: 3–8 (2–7 A-10)
- Head coach: Sean McDonnell (4th season)
- Offensive coordinator: Chip Kelly (4th season)
- Home stadium: Cowell Stadium

2002 Atlantic 10 Conference football standings
| | Conf. | | | Overall |
| Team | W | | L | W | | L |
|---|---|---|---|---|---|---|
| No. 6 Maine $^ | 7 | – | 2 | 11 | – | 3 |
| No. 11 Northeastern $^ | 7 | – | 2 | 10 | – | 3 |
| No. 4 Villanova ^ | 6 | – | 3 | 11 | – | 4 |
| UMass | 6 | – | 3 | 8 | – | 4 |
| William & Mary | 5 | – | 4 | 6 | – | 5 |
| Richmond | 4 | – | 5 | 4 | – | 7 |
| Delaware | 4 | – | 5 | 6 | – | 6 |
| Hofstra | 4 | – | 5 | 6 | – | 6 |
| James Madison | 4 | – | 6 | 5 | – | 7 |
| New Hampshire | 2 | – | 7 | 3 | – | 8 |
| Rhode Island | 1 | – | 8 | 3 | – | 9 |
+ – Conference co-champions; ^ – NCAA Division I-AA playoff participant; Rankings from The Sports Network poll

The 2002 New Hampshire Wildcats football team was an American football team that represented the University of New Hampshire as a member of the Atlantic 10 Conference during the 2002 NCAA Division I-AA football season. In its fourth year under head coach Sean McDonnell, the team compiled a 3–8 record (2–7 against conference opponents) and finished tenth out of eleven teams in the Atlantic 10 Conference.

== Schedule ==
| Date | Opponent | Site | Result | Attendance | Source |
|---|---|---|---|---|---|
| August 29 | at Kent State* | Dix Stadium; Kent, OH | W 7–34 | 16,073 | |
| September 7 | at James Madison | Bridgeforth Stadium; Harrisonburg, VA | L 14–20 | 7,831 | |
| September 14 | No. 17 Hofstra | Cowell Stadium; Durham, NH | L 28–52 | | |
| September 21 | at No. 14 Villanova | Villanova Stadium; Villanova, PA | L 3–45 | | |
| September 28 | at Dartmouth* | Memorial Field; Hanover, NH (rivalry) | W 29–26 | 7,928 | |
| October 12 | Richmond | Cowell Stadium; Durham, NH | W 20–19 | 4,289 | |
| October 19 | No. 14 William & Mary | Cowell Stadium; Durham, NH | L 27–34 | 3,122 | |
| October 26 | at Delaware | Delaware Stadium; Newark, DE | L 9–21 | 19,886 | |
| November 9 | No. 12 UMass | Cowell Stadium; Durham, NH (rivalry) | W 31–14 | 3,686 | |
| November 16 | No. 12 Northeastern | Cowell Stadium; Durham, NH | L 17–49 | | |
| November 23 | at No. 9 Maine | Alfond Stadium; Orono, ME (Battle for the Brice–Cowell Musket) | L 14–31 | | |
*Non-conference game; Rankings from The Sports Network Poll released prior to the game
