= Jim Reid (American football) =

American football player and coach (born 1950)

Current position
- Title: Analyst
- Team: UMass
- Conference: Independent

Biographical details
- Born: December 1, 1950 (age 75)

Playing career
- 1970–1972: Maine
- Position: Defensive back

Coaching career (HC unless noted)
- 1973–1974: UMass (GA)
- 1975: UMass (OLB)
- 1976–1977: UMass (DB)
- 1978–1985: UMass (DC/LB)
- 1986–1991: UMass
- 1992–1993: Richmond (DC)
- 1994: Boston College (DC/LB/DE)
- 1995–2003: Richmond
- 2004: Syracuse (DL)
- 2005: Bucknell (DL)
- 2006–2007: VMI
- 2008–2009: Miami Dolphins (OLB)
- 2010–2012: Virginia (AHC/DC)
- 2013–2015: Iowa (LB)
- 2016–2019: Boston College (DC/LB)
- 2020–2021: UMass (DA)
- 2022–2022: Massachusetts Maritime (DC/LB)
- 2023–2025: UMass (analyst)

Head coaching record
- Overall: 87–101–3
- Tournaments: 1–4 (NCAA D-I-AA playoffs)

Accomplishments and honors

Championships
- 3 Yankee (1986, 1988, 1990); 2 A-10 (1998, 2000)

Awards
- 3× Yankee Coach of Year (1988, 1990, 1995); 2× A-10 Coach of Year (1998, 2000)

James T. Reid (born December 1, 1950) is an American college football coach and former player. He is an analyst for the University of Massachusetts Amherst, a position he held since 2023. Reid served as head football coach at the University of Massachusetts Amherst (UMass) from 1986 to 1991, University of Richmond from 1995 through 2003, and Virginia Military Institute (VMI) from 2006 until 2007, compiling an overall college football record of 87–101–3.

== Playing career ==
Reid played football at the University of Maine before graduating in 1973.

== Coaching career ==
=== UMass ===
Beginning in 1973, Reid spent 19 years coaching at University of Massachusetts Amherst (UMass), where he spent two seasons as a graduate assistant, eleven seasons as an assistant coach, and six seasons as the head coach. He resigned in 1992 after being told he would have to reneg on scholarships promised to some incoming freshmen.

=== Richmond ===
Reid then became defensive coordinator at Richmond for 1992 and 1993 seasons. He was defensive coordinator at Boston College for the 1994 season before returning to Richmond as head coach in 1995. As the Spiders' head coach for nine seasons, from 1995 until 2003, he recorded a record of 48–53–1. This ranks him third at Richmond in total wins and 14th at Richmond in winning percentage.

=== Syracuse and Bucknell ===
Reid spent the 2004 season as the defensive line coach at Syracuse, and spent the 2005 season as defensive line coach at Bucknell.

=== VMI ===
Reid was the 30th head football coach at the Virginia Military Institute (VMI) in Lexington, Virginia. He held that position from the 2006 season until the end of the 2007 season. His career coaching record at VMI was 3 wins, 19 losses, and 0 ties. This ranks him 25th at VMI in total wins and 28th at VMI in winning percentage.

=== Miami Dolphins ===
Reid was hired by the Miami Dolphins of the National Football League (NFL) on January 23, 2008, as their outside linebackers coach. Reid was awarded the "game football" by coach Tony Sparano after the Dolphins 17–10 win over the San Diego Chargers on October 5, 2008.

=== Virginia ===
On January 7, 2010, Reid was officially announced as the new defensive coordinator and associate head coach of the Virginia Cavaliers.

=== Iowa ===
On February 14, 2013, Reid was officially hired as a defensive assistant for the Iowa Hawkeyes.

=== Boston College ===
On January 6, 2016, Reid was chosen by coach Steve Addazio as defensive coordinator for Boston College. Reid was also the former defensive coordinator for the 7-4-1 Eagles in 1994 (who defeated Kansas State in the Aloha Bowl).

=== Massachusetts Maritime ===
Reid joined the staff at Massachusetts Maritime Academy in early 2022 as the defensive coordinator and linebackers coach.

== Personal life ==
Reid earned his bachelor's degree in history and social studies from the University of Maine in 1973. He graduated Medford (MA) High School in 1968. His son, Matt Reid, is assistant baseball coach at FGCU.

== Head coaching record ==
Year	Team	Overall	Conference	Standing	Bowl/playoffs	NCAA^{#}
UMass Minutemen (Yankee Conference) (1986–1991)
1986	UMass	8–3	5–2	T–1st		
1987	UMass	3–8	2–5	T–5th		
1988	UMass	8–4	6–2	T–1st	L NCAA Division I-AA First Round	11
1989	UMass	5–5–1	3–5	7th		
1990	UMass	8–2–1	7–1	1st	L NCAA Division I-AA First Round	9
1991	UMass	7–3	3–5	T–4th		
UMass:		36–29–2	26–20			
Richmond Spiders (Yankee Conference) (1995–1996)
1995	Richmond	7–3–1	5–3	T–3rd (Mid-Atlantic)		
1996	Richmond	2–9	1–7	6th (Mid-Atlantic)		
Richmond Spiders (Atlantic 10 Conference) (1997–2003)
1997	Richmond	6–5	4–4	T–4th (Mid-Atlantic)		
1998	Richmond	9–3	7–1	1st (Mid-Atlantic)	L NCAA Division I-AA First Round	10
1999	Richmond	5–6	3–5	T–6th		
2000	Richmond	10–3	7–1	T–1st	L NCAA Division I-AA Quarterfinal	
2001	Richmond	3–8	3–6	T–8th		
2002	Richmond	4–7	4–5	T–6th		
2003	Richmond	2–9	1–8	11th		
Richmond:		48–53–1	35–40			
VMI Keydets (Big South Conference) (2006–2007)
2006	VMI	1–10	0–4	5th		
2007	VMI	2–9	0–4	5th		
VMI:		3–19	0–8			
Total:		87–101–3				
National championship Conference title Conference division title or championship game berth
