= 2002 Alcorn State Braves football team =

American college football season

2002 Alcorn State Braves football
- Conference: Southwestern Athletic Conference
- East Division
- Record: 6–5 (3–4 SWAC)
- Head coach: Johnny Thomas (5th season)
- Offensive coordinator: John McKenzie (3rd season)
- Home stadium: Jack Spinks Stadium

2002 Southwestern Athletic Conference football standings
	Conf.			Overall
Team	W		L	W		L
East Division
Alabama A&M xy	6	–	1	8	–	4
Jackson State	5	–	2	7	–	4
Alcorn State	3	–	4	6	–	5
Mississippi Valley State	3	–	4	5	–	6
Alabama State	2	–	5	6	–	6
West Division
No. 8 Grambling State xy$	6	–	1	11	–	2
Southern	5	–	2	6	–	6
Texas Southern	3	–	4	4	–	7
Arkansas–Pine Bluff	2	–	5	3	–	8
Prairie View A&M	0	–	7	1	–	10
Championship: Grambling State 31, Alabama A&M 19
$ – Conference champion; x – Division champion/co-champions; y – Championship game participant; Rankings from The Sports Network Poll

The 2002 Alcorn State Braves football team represented Alcorn State University as a member of the Southwestern Athletic Conference (SWAC) during the 2002 NCAA Division I-AA football season. Led by fifth-year head coach Johnny Thomas, the Braves compiled an overall record of 6–5, with a conference record of 3–4, and finished tied for third in the SWAC East Division.

== Schedule ==
Date	Opponent	Site	Result	Attendance	Source
August 31	Arkansas–Pine Bluff	Jack Spinks Stadium; Lorman, MS	W 34–24		
September 7	at No. 18 Grambling State	Eddie G. Robinson Memorial Stadium; Grambling, LA	L 35–41	11,880	
September 21	vs. Hampton*	Giants Stadium; East Rutherford, NJ (New York Urban League Classic)	W 27–23	30,232	
September 28	Alabama State	Jack Spinks Stadium; Lorman, MS	W 48–37	13,585	
October 5	Fort Valley State*^{†}	Jack Spinks Stadium; Lorman, MS	W 10–7		
October 12	at Prairie View A&M	Edward L. Blackshear Field; Prairie View, TX	W 33–13		
October 19	at Samford*	Seibert Stadium; Homewood, AL	L 25–35	6,742	
November 2	at Southern	A. W. Mumford Stadium; Baton Rouge, LA	W 22–20		
November 9	at Mississippi Valley State	Rice–Totten Stadium; Itta Bena, MS	L 6–23		
November 16	at Alabama A&M	Louis Crews Stadium; Normal, AL	L 20–27		
November 23	at Jackson State	Mississippi Veterans Memorial Stadium; Jackson, MS (Capital City Classic)	L 20–34		
*Non-conference game; ^{†}Homecoming; Rankings from The Sports Network Poll released prior to the game
