= 2002 Alabama A&M Bulldogs football team =

American college football season

2002 Alabama A&M Bulldogs football

SWAC East Division champion

SWAC Championship Game, L 19–31 vs. Grambling State
- Conference: Southwestern Athletic Conference
- East Division
- Record: 8–4 (6–1 SWAC)
- Head coach: Anthony Jones (1st season)
- Home stadium: Louis Crews Stadium

2002 Southwestern Athletic Conference football standings
	Conf.			Overall
Team	W		L	W		L
East Division
Alabama A&M xy	6	–	1	8	–	4
Jackson State	5	–	2	7	–	4
Alcorn State	3	–	4	6	–	5
Mississippi Valley State	3	–	4	5	–	6
Alabama State	2	–	5	6	–	6
West Division
No. 8 Grambling State xy$	6	–	1	11	–	2
Southern	5	–	2	6	–	6
Texas Southern	3	–	4	4	–	7
Arkansas–Pine Bluff	2	–	5	3	–	8
Prairie View A&M	0	–	7	1	–	10
Championship: Grambling State 31, Alabama A&M 19
$ – Conference champion; x – Division champion/co-champions; y – Championship game participant; Rankings from The Sports Network Poll

The 2002 Alabama A&M Bulldogs football team represented Alabama A&M University as a member of the Southwestern Athletic Conference (SWAC) during the 2002 NCAA Division I-AA football season. Led by first-year head coach Anthony Jones, the Bulldogs compiled an overall record of 8–4, with a conference record of 6–1, and finished first in the SWAC East Division.

== Schedule ==
Date	Opponent	Site	Result	Attendance	Source
August 31	at No. 24 Jacksonville State*	Paul Snow Stadium; Jacksonville, AL	L 17–20	16,851	
September 14	No. 20 Grambling State	Louis Crews Stadium; Normal, AL	L 13–23	8,785	
September 21	Prairie View A&M	Louis Crews Stadium; Normal, AL	W 15–12		
September 28	at Texas Southern	Robertson Stadium; Houston, TX	W 21–14		
October 5	vs. Southern	RCA Dome; Indianapolis, IN (Circle City Classic)	W 27–11	47,598	
October 12	Tennessee State*	Louis Crews Stadium; Normal, AL	W 25–21	16,162	
October 19	Mississippi Valley State	Louis Crews Stadium; Normal, AL	W 24–13		
October 26	vs. Alabama State	Legion Field; Birmingham, AL (Magic City Classic)	W 23–20		
November 9	at Jackson State	Mississippi Veterans Memorial Stadium; Jackson, MS	L 11–13	10,200	
November 16	Alcorn State	Louis Crews Stadium; Normal, AL	W 27–20		
November 23	at Arkansas–Pine Bluff	Golden Lion Stadium; Pine Bluff, AR	W 39–19		
December 14	vs. No. 8 Grambling State	Legion Field; Birmingham, AL (SWAC Championship Game)	L 19–31	23,727	
*Non-conference game; Rankings from The Sports Network Poll released prior to the game
