= 2002 South Carolina State Bulldogs football team =

American college football season

2002 South Carolina State Bulldogs football
- Conference: Mid-Eastern Athletic Conference
- Record: 7–5 (4–4 MEAC)
- Head coach: Oliver Pough (1st season)
- Home stadium: Oliver C. Dawson Stadium

2002 Mid-Eastern Athletic Conference football standings
	Conf.			Overall
Team	W		L	W		L
No. 15 Bethune–Cookman $^	7	–	1	11	–	2
Florida A&M	5	–	3	7	–	5
Hampton	5	–	3	7	–	5
Morgan State	5	–	3	7	–	5
South Carolina State	4	–	4	7	–	5
Howard	4	–	4	6	–	5
Norfolk State	2	–	6	5	–	6
North Carolina A&T	2	–	6	4	–	8
Delaware State	2	–	6	4	–	8
$ – Conference champion; ^ – NCAA Division I-AA playoff participant; Rankings from The Sports Network poll

The 2002 South Carolina State Bulldogs football team represented South Carolina State University as a member of the Mid-Eastern Athletic Conference (MEAC) during the 2002 NCAA Division I-AA football season. Led by first-year head coach Oliver Pough, the Bulldogs compiled an overall record of 7–5, with a mark of 4–4 in conference play, and finished tied for fifth in the MEAC.

== Schedule ==
Date	Opponent	Rank	Site	Result	Attendance	Source
August 31	Tennessee State*		Oliver C. Dawson Stadium; Orangeburg, SC	W 26–20	8,741	
September 7	vs. Benedict*		Williams–Brice Stadium; Columbia, SC (Palmetto Classic)	W 52–7	46,304	
September 14	Wofford*		Oliver C. Dawson Stadium; Orangeburg, SC	L 6–7	4,745	
September 21	at Savannah State*		Ted Wright Stadium; Savannah, GA	W 50–12	7,556	
October 5	at No. 10 Florida A&M		Bragg Memorial Stadium; Tallahassee, FL	W 31–13	16,520	
October 12	at Norfolk State	No. 25	William "Dick" Price Stadium; Norfolk, VA	W 35–9	5,053	
October 19	No. 11 Bethune–Cookman	No. 18	Oliver C. Dawson Stadium; Orangeburg, SC	L 6–21	20,795	
October 26	Hampton	No. 21	Oliver C. Dawson Stadium; Orangeburg, SC	W 47–41 ^{2OT}	5,507	
November 2	at Delaware State	No. 21	Alumni Stadium; Dover, DE	L 21–27	5,182	
November 9	Howard		Oliver C. Dawson Stadium; Orangeburg, SC	L 9–23	5,054	
November 16	Morgan State		Oliver C. Dawson Stadium; Orangeburg, SC	L 12–23		
November 23	vs. North Carolina A&T		Georgia Dome; Atlanta, GA (Peach State Classic, rivalry)	W 26–9	34,261	
*Non-conference game; Rankings from The Sports Network Poll released prior to the game
