= 2002 Alabama State Hornets football team =

American college football season

2002 Alabama State Hornets football
- Conference: Southwestern Athletic Conference
- East Division
- Record: 6–6 (2–5 SWAC)
- Head coach: L. C. Cole (3rd season)
- Home stadium: Cramton Bowl

2002 Southwestern Athletic Conference football standings
	Conf.			Overall
Team	W		L	W		L
East Division
Alabama A&M xy	6	–	1	8	–	4
Jackson State	5	–	2	7	–	4
Alcorn State	3	–	4	6	–	5
Mississippi Valley State	3	–	4	5	–	6
Alabama State	2	–	5	6	–	6
West Division
No. 8 Grambling State xy$	6	–	1	11	–	2
Southern	5	–	2	6	–	6
Texas Southern	3	–	4	4	–	7
Arkansas–Pine Bluff	2	–	5	3	–	8
Prairie View A&M	0	–	7	1	–	10
Championship: Grambling State 31, Alabama A&M 19
$ – Conference champion; x – Division champion/co-champions; y – Championship game participant; Rankings from The Sports Network Poll

The 2002 Alabama State Hornets football team represented Alabama State University as a member of the Southwestern Athletic Conference (SWAC) during the 2002 NCAA Division I-AA football season. Led by third-year head coach L. C. Cole, the Hornets compiled an overall record of 6–6, with a mark of 2–5 in conference play, and finished fifth in the East Division of the SWAC.

== Schedule ==
Date	Opponent	Rank	Site	Result	Attendance	Source
September 1	vs. Miles*		Legion Field; Birmingham, AL (A.G. Gaston Labor Day Classic)	W 27–6		
September 7	at Chattanooga*		Finley Stadium; Chattanooga, TN	W 41–23	7,180	
September 14	Texas Southern		Cramton Bowl; Montgomery, AL	W 43–32		
September 21	Arkansas–Pine Bluff	No. 25	Cramton Bowl; Montgomery, AL	L 26–32		
September 28	at Alcorn State		Jack Spinks Stadium; Lorman, MS	L 37–48	13,585	
October 5	Morris Brown*		Cramton Bowl; Montgomery, AL	W 40–7		
October 12	vs. Jackson State		Ladd–Peebles Stadium; Mobile, AL (Gulf Coast Classic)	W 24–20	13,293	
October 26	vs. Alabama A&M		Legion Field; Birmingham, AL (Magic City Classic)	L 20–23		
November 9	at No. 7 Grambling State		Eddie G. Robinson Memorial Stadium; Grambling, LA	L 21–34	16,723	
November 16	Mississippi Valley State		Cramton Bowl; Montgomery, AL	L 10–13		
November 23	at Savannah State*		Ted Wright Stadium; Savannah, GA	W 28–13		
November 28	Tuskegee*		Cramton Bowl; Montgomery, AL (Turkey Day Classic)	L 20–25		
*Non-conference game; Rankings from The Sports Network Poll released prior to the game
