= 2002 Monmouth Hawks football team =

American college football season

2002 Monmouth Hawks football
- Conference: Northeast Conference
- Record: 2–8 (2–5 NEC)
- Head coach: Kevin Callahan (10th season)
- Offensive coordinator: Mark Fabish (1st season)
- Offensive scheme: Pro-style
- Defensive coordinator: Andy Bobik (9th season)
- Base defense: 4–3
- Home stadium: Kessler Field

2002 Northeast Conference football standings
| | Conf. | | | Overall |
| Team | W | | L | W | | L |
|---|---|---|---|---|---|---|
| Albany $ | 6 | – | 1 | 8 | – | 4 |
| Stony Brook | 5 | – | 2 | 8 | – | 2 |
| Sacred Heart | 5 | – | 2 | 7 | – | 3 |
| Wagner | 4 | – | 3 | 7 | – | 4 |
| Central Connecticut State | 3 | – | 4 | 5 | – | 6 |
| Robert Morris | 2 | – | 5 | 3 | – | 4 |
| Monmouth | 2 | – | 5 | 2 | – | 8 |
| Saint Francis (PA) | 1 | – | 6 | 2 | – | 8 |
$ – Conference champion

The 2002 Monmouth Hawks football team represented Monmouth University in the 2002 NCAA Division I-AA football season as a member of the Northeast Conference (NEC). The Hawks were led by tenth-year head coach Kevin Callahan and played their home games at Kessler Field. They finished the season 2–8 overall and 2–5 in NEC play to tie for fifth place.

== Schedule ==
| Date | Time | Opponent | Site | Result | Attendance | Source |
|---|---|---|---|---|---|---|
| September 7 | 1:00 p.m. | at Lafayette* | Fisher Field; Easton, PA | L 29–30 | 5,223 | |
| September 14 | 1:00 p.m. | Sacred Heart | Kessler Field; West Long Branch, NJ | L 13–32 | 2,876 | |
| September 21 | 7:00 p.m. | at Morgan State* | Hughes Stadium; Baltimore, MD | L 20–35 | 6,013 | |
| September 28 | 1:30 p.m. | at Robert Morris | Moon Stadium; Moon Township, PA | L 10–15 | 1,974 | |
| October 12 | 1:00 p.m. | Stony Brook | Kessler Field; West Long Branch, NJ | W 14–9 | 1,014 | |
| October 19 | 1:00 p.m. | Central Connecticut State | Kessler Field; West Long Branch, NJ | L 9–10 | 2,874 | |
| October 26 | 1:00 p.m. | at Wagner | Wagner College Stadium; Staten Island, NY | L 6–7 | 1,466 | |
| November 2 | 1:00 p.m. | Towson* | Kessler Field; West Long Branch, NJ | L 0–20 | 1,845 | |
| November 9 | 1:00 p.m. | Saint Francis (PA) | Kessler Field; West Long Branch, NJ | W 7–0 | 1,018 | |
| November 16 | 1:00 p.m. | at Albany | University Field; Albany, NY | L 7–19 | 757 | |
*Non-conference game; All times are in Eastern time
