= 2002 Delaware Fightin' Blue Hens football team =

American college football season

2002 Delaware Fightin' Blue Hens football
- Conference: Atlantic 10 Conference
- Record: 6–6 (4–5 A-10)
- Head coach: K. C. Keeler (1st season)
- Offensive coordinator: Kirk Ciarrocca (1st season)
- Offensive scheme: Spread
- Defensive coordinator: Dave Cohen (1st season)
- Base defense: 4–3
- Home stadium: Delaware Stadium

2002 Atlantic 10 Conference football standings
	Conf.			Overall
Team	W		L	W		L
No. 6 Maine $^	7	–	2	11	–	3
No. 11 Northeastern $^	7	–	2	10	–	3
No. 4 Villanova ^	6	–	3	11	–	4
UMass	6	–	3	8	–	4
William & Mary	5	–	4	6	–	5
Richmond	4	–	5	4	–	7
Delaware	4	–	5	6	–	6
Hofstra	4	–	5	6	–	6
James Madison	4	–	6	5	–	7
New Hampshire	2	–	7	3	–	8
Rhode Island	1	–	8	3	–	9
+ – Conference co-champions; ^ – NCAA Division I-AA playoff participant; Rankings from The Sports Network poll

The 2002 Delaware Fightin' Blue Hens football team were an American college football team. They represented the University of Delaware as a member of the Atlantic 10 Conference (A-10) during the 2002 NCAA Division I-AA football season. Led by first-year head coach K. C. Keeler, the Fightin' Blue Hens compiled an overall record of 6–6 with a mark of 4–5 in conference play, placing in a three-way tie for sixth in the A-10. The team played home games at Delaware Stadium in Newark, Delaware. Keeler succeeded Tubby Raymond, who retired as head coach in 2001 after helming the team for 36 seasons.

== Schedule ==
Date	Time	Opponent	Rank	Site	TV	Result	Attendance	Source
August 29	7:00 pm	No. 5 Georgia Southern*	No. 22	Delaware Stadium; Newark, DE		W 22–19	19,056	
September 7	3:00 pm	at Richmond	No. 9	University of Richmond Stadium; Richmond, VA		L 13–15	6,364	
September 14	2:00 pm	at The Citadel*	No. 15	Johnson Hagood Stadium; Charleston, SC		L 20–24	14,105	
September 21	7:00 pm	West Chester*		Delaware Stadium; Newark, DE (rivalry)		W 31–10	21,064	
September 28	1:00 pm	at No. 17 William & Mary		Zable Stadium; Williamsburg, VA (rivalry)		L 42–45	11,682	
October 5	1:00 pm	No. 11 Northeastern		Delaware Stadium; Newark, DE		W 27–10	21,043	
October 12	12:00 pm	James Madison^{†}		Delaware Stadium; Newark, DE (rivalry)		W 23–10	19,666	
October 19	12:00 pm	at Rhode Island		Meade Stadium; Kingston, RI		L 14–17 ^{OT}	5,791	
October 26	12:00 pm	New Hampshire		Delaware Stadium; Newark, DE	CN8	W 21–9	19,886	
November 2	12:00 pm	at No. 13 UMass		Warren McGuirk Alumni Stadium; Hadley, MA		L 7–17	11,553	
November 9	12:00 pm	at No. 5 Maine		Alfond Stadium; Orono, ME		W 37–13	4,792	
November 23	1:00 pm	No. 13 Villanova		Delaware Stadium; Newark, DE (Battle of the Blue)	CN8	L 34–38	20,850	
*Non-conference game; ^{†}Homecoming; Rankings from The Sports Network Poll released prior to the game; All times are in Eastern time

== Roster ==
2002 Delaware Fightin' Blue Hens football team roster
Players
Coaches
Offense

Pos.	#	Name	Class
RB	1	Keith Burnell	Sr
QB	12	Andy Hall	Jr
OT	60	Brian Williams	Sr

Defense

Pos.	#	Name	Class
DB	24	Mike Adams	Sr
LB	58	Mondoe Davis	So
DL	68	Joe Minucci	Sr

Special teams

Pos.	#	Name	Class

Head coach

- K. C. Keeler

Coordinators/assistant coaches

Legend

- (C) Team captain
- (S) Suspended
- (I) Ineligible
- Injured
- Redshirt

Roster
