= 2002 Florida A&M Rattlers football team =

American college football season

2002 Florida A&M Rattlers football
- Conference: Mid-Eastern Athletic Conference
- Record: 7–5 (5–3 MEAC)
- Head coach: Billy Joe (9th season)
- Offensive scheme: Gulf Coast
- Home stadium: Bragg Memorial Stadium

2002 Mid-Eastern Athletic Conference football standings
	Conf.			Overall
Team	W		L	W		L
No. 15 Bethune–Cookman $^	7	–	1	11	–	2
Florida A&M	5	–	3	7	–	5
Hampton	5	–	3	7	–	5
Morgan State	5	–	3	7	–	5
South Carolina State	4	–	4	7	–	5
Howard	4	–	4	6	–	5
Norfolk State	2	–	6	5	–	6
North Carolina A&T	2	–	6	4	–	8
Delaware State	2	–	6	4	–	8
$ – Conference champion; ^ – NCAA Division I-AA playoff participant; Rankings from The Sports Network poll

The 2002 Florida A&M Rattlers football team represented Florida A&M University as a member of the Mid-Eastern Athletic Conference (MEAC) during the 2002 NCAA Division I-AA football season. Led by ninth-year head coach Billy Joe, the Rattlers compiled an overall record of 7–5, with a mark of 5–3 in conference play, and finished tied for second in the MEAC.

== Schedule ==
Date	Time	Opponent	Rank	Site	Result	Attendance	Source
August 31	7:00 p.m.	at No. 1 (I-A) Miami (FL)*	No. 16	Miami Orange Bowl; Miami, FL	L 17–63	68,548	
September 7	7:00 p.m.	Morris Brown*	No. 21	Bragg Memorial Stadium; Tallahassee, FL	W 64–6	17,945	
September 14	1:30 p.m.	vs. Morgan State	No. 19	Paul Brown Stadium; Cincinnati, OH (P&G River Front Classic)	W 34–16	23,619	
September 21	1:00 p.m.	at Delaware State	No. 15	Alumni Stadium; Dover, DE	W 20–18	4,135	
September 28	3:00 p.m.	vs. Tennessee State*	No. 11	Georgia Dome; Atlanta, GA (Atlanta Football Classic)	W 37–24	67,167	
October 5	7:00 p.m.	South Carolina State	No. 10	Bragg Memorial Stadium; Tallahassee, FL	L 13–31	16,520	
October 12	4:00 p.m.	Howard	No. 21	Bragg Memorial Stadium; Tallahassee, FL	L 24–28	16,216	
October 19	4:00 p.m.	North Carolina A&T		Bragg Memorial Stadium; Tallahassee, FL	W 36–28	10,493	
October 26	7:00 p.m.	at Norfolk State		William "Dick" Price Stadium; Norfolk, VA	W 34–31	6,287	
November 2	3:00 p.m.	Hampton		Bragg Memorial Stadium; Tallahassee, FL	W 25–13	29,065	
November 9	4:00 p.m.	vs. Troy State*	No. 24	Ladd–Peebles Stadium; Mobile, AL (Azalea City Classic)	L 7–24	13,894	
November 23	4:00 p.m.	vs. No. 11 Bethune–Cookman		Florida Citrus Bowl; Orlando, FL (Florida Classic)	L 10–37	70,201	
*Non-conference game; Rankings from The Sports Network Poll released prior to the game; All times are in Eastern time
