= 2002 Villanova Wildcats football team =

American college football season

2002 Villanova Wildcats football

Lambert Cup winner

NCAA Division I-AA Semifinal, L 28–39 vs. McNeese State
- Conference: Atlantic 10 Conference

Ranking
- Sports Network: No. 4
- Record: 11–4 (7–1 A-10)
- Head coach: Andy Talley (18th season)
- Offensive coordinator: Sam Venuto (4th season)
- Offensive scheme: Multiple spread
- Defensive coordinator: Joe Trainer (6th season)
- Base defense: 4–3
- Home stadium: Villanova Stadium

2002 Atlantic 10 Conference football standings
	Conf.			Overall
Team	W		L	W		L
No. 6 Maine $^	7	–	2	11	–	3
No. 11 Northeastern $^	7	–	2	10	–	3
No. 4 Villanova ^	6	–	3	11	–	4
UMass	6	–	3	8	–	4
William & Mary	5	–	4	6	–	5
Richmond	4	–	5	4	–	7
Delaware	4	–	5	6	–	6
Hofstra	4	–	5	6	–	6
James Madison	4	–	6	5	–	7
New Hampshire	2	–	7	3	–	8
Rhode Island	1	–	8	3	–	9
+ – Conference co-champions; ^ – NCAA Division I-AA playoff participant; Rankings from The Sports Network poll

The 2002 Villanova Wildcats football team was an American football team that represented the Villanova University in the Atlantic 10 Conference during the 2002 NCAA Division I-AA football season. In their 18th season under head coach Andy Talley, the Wildcats compiled an 11–4 record (7–1 against conference opponents), outscored opponents by a total of 448 to 278, and was ranked No. 4 in The Sports Network I-AA Poll. The team advanced to the Division I-AA playoffs, defeating Furman in the first round and Fordham in the quarterfinals, before losing to McNeese State in the semifinals. The Wildcats played their home games at Villanova Stadium in Villanova, Pennsylvania.

== Schedule ==
Date	Time	Opponent	Rank	Site	Result	Attendance	Source
August 31	7:00 p.m.	at Rutgers*		Rutgers Stadium; Piscataway, NJ	W 37–19	20,911	
September 7	1:00 p.m.	at Colgate	No. 15	Andy Kerr Stadium; Hamilton, NY	W 20–0	6,532	
September 14	6:00 p.m.	No. 6 Maine	No. 11	Villanova Stadium; Villanova, PA	L 14–21	8,515	
September 21	12:00 p.m.	New Hampshire	No. 14	Villanova Stadium; Villanova, PA	W 45–3		
September 28	6:00 p.m.	at No. 23 James Madison	No. 8	Bridgeforth Stadium; Harrisonburg, VA	W 30–26	9,153	
October 5	12:00 p.m.	Hofstra	No. 7	Villanova Stadium; Villanova, PA	W 35–7		
October 10	7:00 p.m.	No. 24 Penn	No. 6	Villanova Stadium; Villanova, PA	W 17–3	8,129	
October 19	1:00 p.m.	at No. 20 UMass	No. 4	McGuirk Stadium; Hadley, MA	L 16–17	11,208	
November 2	12:00 p.m.	No. 12 William & Mary	No. 11	Villanova Stadium; Villanova, PA	W 41–20	7,153	
November 9	12:30 p.m.	at No. 18 Northeastern	No. 11	Parsons Field; Brookline, MA	L 13–38	6,463	
November 16	1:00 p.m.	Rhode Island	No. 14	Villanova Stadium; Villanova, PA	W 45–3		
November 23		at Delaware	No. 13	Delaware Stadium; Newark, DE (rivalry)	W 38–34	20,850	
November 30	12:00 p.m.	No. 6 Furman*	No. 12	Villanova Stadium; Villanova, PA (NCAA Division I-AA First Round)	W 45–38		
December 7	12:00 p.m.	No. 21 Fordham*	No. 12	Villanova Stadium; Villanova, PA (NCAA Division I-AA Quarterfinal)	W 24–10	4,351	
December 14	2:00 p.m.	No. 1 McNeese State*	No. 12	Cowboy Stadium; Lake Charles, LA (NCAA Division I-AA Semifinal)	L 28–39		
*Non-conference game; Rankings from The Sports Network Poll released prior to the game; All times are in Eastern time
