= 2002 Canisius Golden Griffins football team =

American college football season

2002 Canisius Golden Griffins football
- Conference: Metro Atlantic Athletic Conference
- Record: 2–9 (2–6 MAAC)
- Head coach: Ed Argast (3rd season)
- Home stadium: Demske Field

2002 Metro Atlantic Athletic Conference football standings
	Conf.			Overall
Team	W		L	W		L
Duquesne $	8	–	0	11	–	1
Marist	5	–	3	7	–	4
Saint Peter's	5	–	3	6	–	5
Fairfield	5	–	3	5	–	6
Iona	4	–	4	5	–	6
Siena	3	–	5	3	–	7
St. John's	2	–	6	2	–	8
Canisius	2	–	6	2	–	9
La Salle	2	–	6	2	–	9
$ – Conference champion

The 2002 Canisius Golden Griffins football team represented Canisius College as a member of the Metro Atlantic Athletic Conference (MAAC) during the 2002 NCAA Division I-AA football season. Led by third-year head coach Ed Argast, the Golden Griffins compiled an overall record of 2–9 with a mark of 2–6 in conference play, tying for seventh place in the MAAC. The team's offense scored 113 points while the defense allowed 329 points. The Canisius football program was discontinued at the conclusion of the 2002 season.

== Schedule ==
Date	Time	Opponent	Site	Result	Attendance
September 7	1:00 pm	at St. John's	DaSilva Memorial Field; Jamaica, NY	L 14–17	1,152
September 14	7:00 pm	at Marist	Leonidoff Field; Poughkeepsie, NY	L 0–28	2,278
September 21	1:30 pm	Siena	Demske Field; Buffalo, NY	L 11–18	927
September 28	1:30 pm	Saint Peter's	Demske Field; Buffalo, NY	L 3–35	1,106
October 5	1:00 pm	at Iona	Mazzella Field; New Rochelle, NY	W 14–13	1,100
October 12	1:30 pm	La Salle	Demske Field; Buffalo, NY	W 30–27	538
October 19	1:00 pm	at Albany*	University Field; Albany, NY	L 14–44	3,919
October 26	1:00 pm	at Fairfield	Alumni Stadium; Fairfield, CT	L 14–21	1,517
November 2	1:00 pm	at Dayton*	Welcome Stadium; Dayton, OH	L 6–42	3,193
November 9	1:30 pm	Duquesne	Demske Field; Buffalo, NY	L 0–42	1,476
November 16	1:00 pm	at Stony Brook*	Kenneth P. LaValle Stadium; Stony Brook, NY	L 7–42	1,767
*Non-conference game; All times are in Eastern time
