= 2002 William & Mary Tribe football team =

American college football season

2002 William & Mary Tribe football
- Conference: Atlantic 10 Conference
- Record: 6–5 (5–4 A-10)
- Head coach: Jimmye Laycock (23rd season)
- Offensive coordinator: Zbig Kepa (10th season)
- Defensive coordinator: Tom Clark (2nd season)
- Captains: Dwight Beard; David Corley Jr.; Mohammed Youssofi
- Home stadium: Zable Stadium

2002 Atlantic 10 Conference football standings
	Conf.			Overall
Team	W		L	W		L
No. 6 Maine $^	7	–	2	11	–	3
No. 11 Northeastern $^	7	–	2	10	–	3
No. 4 Villanova ^	6	–	3	11	–	4
UMass	6	–	3	8	–	4
William & Mary	5	–	4	6	–	5
Richmond	4	–	5	4	–	7
Delaware	4	–	5	6	–	6
Hofstra	4	–	5	6	–	6
James Madison	4	–	6	5	–	7
New Hampshire	2	–	7	3	–	8
Rhode Island	1	–	8	3	–	9
+ – Conference co-champions; ^ – NCAA Division I-AA playoff participant; Rankings from The Sports Network poll

The 2002 William & Mary Tribe football team represented the College of William & Mary as member of the Atlantic 10 Conference (A-10) during the 2002 NCAA Division I-AA football season. Led by Jimmye Laycock in his 23rd year as head coach, William & Mary finished the season with an overall record of 6–5 and a mark of 5–4 in A-10 play, placing fifth.

== Schedule ==
Date	Time	Opponent	Rank	Site	TV	Result	Attendance	Source
August 31	4:00 pm	at Indiana*	No. 9	Memorial Stadium; Bloomington, IN		L 17–25	33,427	
September 7	6:00 pm	at No. 11 Maine	No. 10	Alfond Stadium; Orono, ME		L 14–27	6,326	
September 14	1:00 pm	VMI*	No. 18	Zable Stadium; Williamsburg, VA (rivalry)		W 62–31	9,963	
September 28	1:00 pm	Delaware	No. 17	Zable Stadium; Williamsburg, VA (rivalry)		W 45–42	11,682	
October 12	1:30 pm	at Hofstra	No. 17	James M. Shuart Stadium; Hempstead, NY		W 16–3	3,032	
October 19	12:00 pm	at New Hampshire	No. 14	Cowell Stadium; Durham, NH		W 34–17	3,122	
October 26	1:00 pm	No. 15 Northeastern^{†}	No. 14	Zable Stadium; Williamsburg, VA		W 30–13	8,741	
November 2	12:00 pm	at No. 11 Villanova	No. 12	Villanova Stadium; Villanova, PA	CSN	L 20–41	7,153	
November 9	1:00 pm	Rhode Island	No. 20	Zable Stadium; Williamsburg, VA		W 44–6	5,502	
November 16	1:30 pm	at James Madison	No. 16	Bridgeforth Stadium; Harrisonburg, VA (rivalry)		L 31–34 ^{OT}	8,237	
November 23	12:00 pm	Richmond	No. 23	Zable Stadium; Williamsburg, VA (I-64 Bowl)	CSN	L 13–35	6,274	
*Non-conference game; ^{†}Homecoming; Rankings from The Sports Network Poll released prior to the game; All times are in Eastern time
