= Matt Reid (baseball) =

American college baseball coach (born 1978)

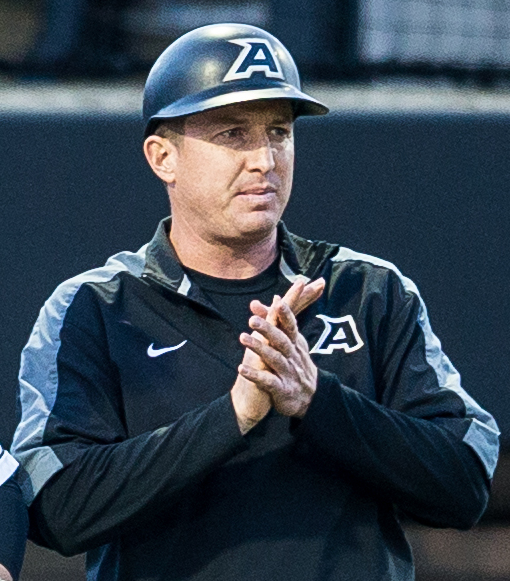
- Reid with Army in 2014

Current position
- Title: Assistant coach
- Team: Florida Gulf Coast
- Conference: Atlantic Sun

Biographical details
- Born: June 19, 1978 (age 48); Amherst, Massachusetts, U.S.

Playing career
- 1998–2001: Richmond

Coaching career (HC unless noted)
- 2002: VMI (Asst.)
- 2003: Louisburg (Asst.)
- 2004: VCU (Asst.)
- 2005: Old Dominion (Asst.)
- 2006–2007: UNC Asheville (Asst.)
- 2008–2013: Army (Asst.)
- 2014–2016: Army
- 2018–present: Florida Gulf Coast (Asst.)

Head coaching record
- Overall: 70–76
- Tournaments: Patriot: 1–2

Matthew Reid (born June 19, 1978) is an American college baseball coach and former player. He currently serves as an assistant coach for the Florida Gulf Coast Eagles baseball team. He has also served as the head coach of the Army Black Knights baseball program. He was named to that position on an interim basis prior to the 2014 season; Army made him its full-time head coach following the season. Reid is the son of American football coach Jim Reid.

Reid played college baseball at Richmond, where he lettered all four years, batted .113, and served as team captain in his senior season. He began his coaching career at VMI, then worked with infielders at Louisburg. He then as an assistant coach at VCU, where he completed a master's degree in Sport Leadership. Reid then spent a season with Old Dominion before two seasons at UNC Asheville. Reid joined Army's staff in 2008, and added associate head coach duties in 2011. Head coach Joe Sottolano was fired after the 2013 season, and Reid was elevated to head coach. He served as interim head coach for the 2014 season and took over on a full-time basis in 2015.

== Head coaching record ==
Below is a table of Reid's yearly records as an NCAA head baseball coach.

Record table
Season	Team	Overall	Conference	Standing	Postseason
Army Black Knights (Patriot League) (2014–2016)
2014	Army	33–18	15–5	T–1st	Patriot League Tournament
2015	Army	21–26	6–14	6th	
2016	Army	16–32	6–13	6th	
Army:		70–76	27–32		
Total:		70–76			
National champion Postseason invitational champion Conference regular season champion Conference regular season and conference tournament champion Division regular season champion Division regular season and conference tournament champion Conference tournament champion
