= 2002 Wagner Seahawks football team =

American college football season

2002 Wagner Seahawks football
- Conference: Northeast Conference
- Record: 7–4 (4–3 NEC)
- Head coach: Walt Hameline (22nd season)
- Home stadium: Wagner College Stadium

2002 Northeast Conference football standings
	Conf.			Overall
Team	W		L	W		L
Albany $	6	–	1	8	–	4
Stony Brook	5	–	2	8	–	2
Sacred Heart	5	–	2	7	–	3
Wagner	4	–	3	7	–	4
Central Connecticut State	3	–	4	5	–	6
Robert Morris	2	–	5	3	–	4
Monmouth	2	–	5	2	–	8
Saint Francis (PA)	1	–	6	2	–	8
$ – Conference champion

The 2002 Wagner Seahawks football team represented Wagner College in the 2002 NCAA Division I-AA football season as a member of the Northeast Conference (NEC). The Seahawks were led by 22nd-year head coach Walt Hameline and played their home games at Wagner College Stadium. Wagner finished the season 7–4 overall and 4–3 in NEC play to place third.

== Schedule ==
Date	Time	Opponent	Site	Result	Attendance	Source
September 7	1:00 p.m.	at La Salle*	McCarthy Stadium; Philadelphia, PA	W 42–7	2,523	
September 14	1:00 p.m.	Iona*	Wagner College Stadium; Staten Island, NY	W 34–0	1,987	
September 21	1:00 p.m.	Stony Brook	Wagner College Stadium; Staten Island, NY	W 17–14	3,218	
September 28	7:00 p.m.	at Marist*	Leonidoff Field; Poughkeepsie, NY	L 16–31	3,178	
October 5	1:00 p.m.	at Albany	University Field; Albany, NY	L 14–35	1,753	
October 12	1:00 p.m.	at Robert Morris	Wagner College Stadium; Staten Island, NY	W 29–0	1,083	
October 19	1:00 p.m.	at Saint Francis (PA)	Pine Bowl; Loretto, PA	W 7–0	352	
October 26	1:00 p.m.	Monmouth	Wagner College Stadium; Staten Island, NY	W 7–6	1,466	
November 2	1:00 p.m.	at Sacred Heart	Campus Field; Fairfield, CT	L 7–10 ^{OT}	1,671	
November 9	1:00 p.m.	at Central Connecticut State	Arute Field; New Britain, CT	L 17–24	5,500	
November 16	1:00 p.m.	at Jacksonville*	D. B. Milne Field; Jacksonville, FL	W 42–7	1,009	
*Non-conference game; All times are in Eastern time
