= 2002 Northeastern Huskies football team =

American college football season

2002 Northeastern Huskies football

A-10 co-champion

NCAA Division I-AA First Round, L 24–29 vs. Fordham
- Conference: Atlantic 10 Conference

Ranking
- Sports Network: No. 11
- Record: 10–3 (7–2 A-10)
- Head coach: Don Brown (3rd season)
- Offensive coordinator: Kevin Morris (3rd season)
- Captains: Kurt Abrams; Steve Anzalone; John McDonald; Art Smith
- Home stadium: Parsons Field

2002 Atlantic 10 Conference football standings
	Conf.			Overall
Team	W		L	W		L
No. 6 Maine $^	7	–	2	11	–	3
No. 11 Northeastern $^	7	–	2	10	–	3
No. 4 Villanova ^	6	–	3	11	–	4
UMass	6	–	3	8	–	4
William & Mary	5	–	4	6	–	5
Richmond	4	–	5	4	–	7
Delaware	4	–	5	6	–	6
Hofstra	4	–	5	6	–	6
James Madison	4	–	6	5	–	7
New Hampshire	2	–	7	3	–	8
Rhode Island	1	–	8	3	–	9
+ – Conference co-champions; ^ – NCAA Division I-AA playoff participant; Rankings from The Sports Network poll

The 2002 Northeastern Huskies football team represented Northeastern University during the 2002 NCAA Division I-AA football season. It was the program's 67th season and they finished as Atlantic 10 Conference (A-10) co-champions with Maine. Picked to finish 10th in the conference preseason poll, the Huskies went on to set school records for single season overall wins (10) and conference wins (7). They also upset favored Division I-A opponent Ohio 31–0, a marquee win in Northeastern's football program's history. The Huskies were seeded fourth in the 16-team Division I-AA playoffs bracket but lost to Fordham, 24–29, in the first round. Ten players earned spots on the All-Atlantic 10 team. The Huskies were led by third-year head coach Don Brown.

== Schedule ==
Date	Time	Opponent	Rank	Site	Result	Attendance	Source
August 31		Lock Haven*		Parsons Field; Brookline, MA	W 48–0		
September 7	7:00 p.m.	at Ohio*	No. 22	Peden Stadium; Athens, OH	W 31–0	21,002	
September 21	12:30 p.m.	UMass	No. 18	Parsons Field; Brookline, MA	W 42–17	6,651	
September 28		No. 24 Hofstra	No. 14	Parsons Field; Brookline, MA	W 28–17		
October 5	1:00 p.m.	at Delaware	No. 11	Delaware Stadium; Newark, DE	L 10–27	21,043	
October 12		Rhode Island	No. 20	Parsons Field; Brookline, MA	W 38–13		
October 19		at Harvard*	No. 15	Harvard Stadium; Boston, MA	W 17–14		
October 26	1:00 p.m.	at No. 14 William & Mary	No. 15	Zable Stadium; Williamsburg, VA	L 13–30	8,741	
November 2	1:00 p.m.	at Richmond	No. 20	UR Stadium; Richmond, VA	W 24–21	5,106	
November 9		No. 11 Villanova^{†}	No. 18	Parsons Field; Brookline, MA	W 38–13	6,463	
November 16		at New Hampshire	No. 12	Wildcat Stadium; Durham, NH	W 49–17		
November 23		James Madison	No. 10	Parsons Field; Brookline, MA	W 41–10	4,825	
November 30		No. 21 Fordham*	No. 8	Parsons Field; Brookline, MA (NCAA Division I-AA First Round)	L 24–29		
*Non-conference game; ^{†}Homecoming; Rankings from The Sports Network Poll released prior to the game; All times are in Eastern time

== Awards and honors ==
- First Team All-Conference – Steve Anzalone, Liam Ezekiel, Tim Gale, Miro Kesic, John McDonald, Art Smith
- Second Team All-Conference – Kurt Abrams, Tom Olivo, Adam Walter
- Third Team All-Conference – Adam Bourget
- Atlantic 10 Coach of the Year – Don Brown
- New England All-Stars – Kurt Abrams, Steve Anzalone, Liam Ezekiel, John McDonald, Art Smith
