= 2002 Richmond Spiders football team =

American college football season

2002 Richmond Spiders football
- Conference: Atlantic 10 Conference
- Record: 4–7 (4–5 A-10)
- Head coach: Jim Reid (8th season)
- Offensive coordinator: Tony DeMeo (1st season)
- Home stadium: University of Richmond Stadium

2002 Atlantic 10 Conference football standings
	Conf.			Overall
Team	W		L	W		L
No. 6 Maine $^	7	–	2	11	–	3
No. 11 Northeastern $^	7	–	2	10	–	3
No. 4 Villanova ^	6	–	3	11	–	4
UMass	6	–	3	8	–	4
William & Mary	5	–	4	6	–	5
Richmond	4	–	5	4	–	7
Delaware	4	–	5	6	–	6
Hofstra	4	–	5	6	–	6
James Madison	4	–	6	5	–	7
New Hampshire	2	–	7	3	–	8
Rhode Island	1	–	8	3	–	9
+ – Conference co-champions; ^ – NCAA Division I-AA playoff participant; Rankings from The Sports Network poll

The 2002 Richmond Spiders football team represented the University of Richmond during the 2002 NCAA Division I-AA football season. Richmond competed as a member of the Atlantic 10 Conference (A-10), and played their home games at the University of Richmond Stadium.

The Spiders were led by eighth-year head coach Jim Reid and finished the regular season with a 4–7 overall record and 4–5 record in conference play.

== Schedule ==
Date	Time	Opponent	Rank	Site	Result	Attendance	Source
August 29	7:00 p.m.	at Temple*		Franklin Field; Philadelphia, PA	L 7–34	15,329	
September 7	3:00 p.m.	No. 9 Delaware		UR Stadium; Richmond, VA	W 15–13	6,364	
September 21	3:00 p.m.	No. 7 Furman*	No. 22	UR Stadium; Richmond, VA	L 7–17	7,189	
October 5	3:00 p.m.	UMass		UR Stadium; Richmond, VA	L 13–34	6,927	
October 12	noon	at New Hampshire		Cowell Stadium; Durham, NH	L 19–20	4,289	
October 19	6:00 p.m.	James Madison^{†}		UR Stadium; Richmond, VA (rivalry)	W 26–0	8,113	
October 26^{1}	noon	at Rhode Island		Meade Stadium; Kingston, RI	W 26–0	1,451	
November 2	1:00 p.m.	No. 20 Northeastern		UR Stadium; Richmond, VA	L 21–24	5,106	
November 9	1:30 p.m.	at Hofstra		Shuart Stadium; Hempstead, NY	L 16–26	3,235	
November 16	1:00 p.m.	No. 11 Maine		UR Stadium; Richmond, VA	L 14–21	3,554	
November 23	noon	at No. 24 William & Mary		Zable Stadium; Williamsburg, VA (I-64 Bowl)	W 35–13	6,274	
*Non-conference game; ^{†}Homecoming; Rankings from The Sports Network Poll released prior to the game; All times are in Eastern time

- ^1 Game was suspended at halftime due to flooding on the field and resumed on October 27 at 11:45 a.m.

== Roster ==
2002 Richmond Spiders football team roster
Players
Coaches
Offense

Pos.	#	Name	Class
RB	14	Warith Alkebu-Lan	Sr
RB	29	Andre Cobbs	Fr
OL	60	Chris Collier	Jr
QB	19	Tony Conti	So
RB	20	Kenny Dantzler	Jr
RB	6	Claude Diggs	Sr
RB	21	David Edwards	Jr
OL	77	Justin McElfish	Fr
WR	81	Dan McNair	Sr
RB	37	Brandon Neuman	Fr
WR	82	Boyd Ouden	Jr
QB	15	John Richardson	Fr
QB	3	Stacy Tutt	Fr

Defense

Pos.	#	Name	Class
LB	7	Adrian Archie	Sr
DB	22	Matthew Barkley	Jr
DE	97	Steve Boyer	Jr
DE	42	Brian Burnette	Fr
OL	75	Josh Burnette	Fr
DL	66	Clifton Coker	So
DB	31	Maurice Newbill	Sr
LB	16	Mark Thompson	Sr

Special teams

Pos.	#	Name	Class
K	47	Doug Kirchner	Sr

Head coach

- Jim Reid

Coordinators/assistant coaches

Legend

- (C) Team captain
- (S) Suspended
- (I) Ineligible
- Injured
- Redshirt

Roster
Last update: 2002-10-28
