= 2002 Robert Morris Colonials football team =

American college football season

2002 Robert Morris Colonials football
- Conference: Northeast Conference
- Record: 3–7 (2–5 NEC)
- Head coach: Joe Walton (9th season)
- Defensive coordinator: Dan Radakovich (8th season)
- Home stadium: Moon Stadium

2002 Northeast Conference football standings
	Conf.			Overall
Team	W		L	W		L
Albany $	6	–	1	8	–	4
Stony Brook	5	–	2	8	–	2
Sacred Heart	5	–	2	7	–	3
Wagner	4	–	3	7	–	4
Central Connecticut State	3	–	4	5	–	6
Robert Morris	2	–	5	3	–	4
Monmouth	2	–	5	2	–	8
Saint Francis (PA)	1	–	6	2	–	8
$ – Conference champion

The 2002 Robert Morris Colonials football team represented Robert Morris University as a member of the Northeast Conference (NEC) during the 2002 NCAA Division I-AA football season. The Colonials were led by 9th-year head coach Joe Walton and played their home games at Moon Stadium on the campus of Moon Area High School.

== Schedule ==
Date	Opponent	Site	Result	Attendance
September 7	Buffalo State*	Moon Stadium; Moon Township, PA	W 41–12	1,238
September 14	at Dayton*	Welcome Stadium; Dayton, OH	L 10–24	4,369
September 21	Central Connecticut State	Moon Stadium; Moon Township, PA	W 14–0	1,033
September 28	Monmouth	Moon Stadium; Moon Township, PA	W 15–10	1,974
October 5	at Sacred Heart	Campus Field; Fairfield, CT	L 0–34	2,417
October 12	at Wagner	Wagner College Stadium; Staten Island, NY	L 0–29	1,083
October 26	at Gannon*	Gannon University Field; Erie, PA	L 21–49	1,000
November 2	Albany	Moon Stadium; Moon Township, PA	L 7–32	938
November 9	at Stony Brook	LaValle Stadium; Stony Brook, NY	L 13–23	4,672
November 16	at Saint Francis	Pine Bowl; Loretto, PA	L 7–14 ^{OT}	707
*Non-conference game
