= 2002 Stony Brook Seawolves football team =

American college football season

2002 Stony Brook Seawolves football
- Conference: Northeast Conference
- Record: 8–2 (5–2 NEC)
- Head coach: Sam Kornhauser (19th season)
- Home stadium: Kenneth P. LaValle Stadium

2002 Northeast Conference football standings
	Conf.			Overall
Team	W		L	W		L
Albany $	6	–	1	8	–	4
Stony Brook	5	–	2	8	–	2
Sacred Heart	5	–	2	7	–	3
Wagner	4	–	3	7	–	4
Central Connecticut State	3	–	4	5	–	6
Robert Morris	2	–	5	3	–	4
Monmouth	2	–	5	2	–	8
Saint Francis (PA)	1	–	6	2	–	8
$ – Conference champion

The 2002 Stony Brook Seawolves football team represented Stony Brook University as a member of the Northeast Conference (NEC) during the 2002 NCAA Division I-AA football season. Led by 19th-year head coach Sam Kornhauser, the Seawolves compiled an overall record of 8–2 with a mark of 5–2 in conference place, tying for second place in the NEC. Stony Brook played home games at Kenneth P. LaValle Stadium in Stony Brook, New York.

== Schedule ==
Date	Time	Opponent	Site	Result	Attendance
September 14	6:00 p.m.	St. John's*	Kenneth P. LaValle Stadium; Stony Brook, NY	W 34–9	8,136
September 21	1:00 p.m.	at Wagner	Wagner College Stadium; Staten Island, NY	L 14–17	3,218
September 28	6:00 p.m.	Albany	Kenneth P. LaValle Stadium; Stony Brook, NY (rivalry)	W 24–20	6,331
October 5	1:00 p.m.	at St. Francis (PA)	DeGol Field; Loretto, PA	W 24–14	647
October 12	1:00 p.m.	at Monmouth	Kessler Field; West Long Branch, NJ	L 9–14	1,014
October 19	4:00 p.m.	Sacred Heart	Kenneth P. LaValle Stadium; Stony Brook, NY	W 24–14	6,472
October 26	1:00 p.m.	at Siena*	Loudonville, NY	W 14–0	400
November 2	6:00 p.m.	at Central Connecticut State	Arute Field; New Britain, CT	W 24–10	2,296
November 9	1:00 p.m.	Robert Morris	Kenneth P. LaValle Stadium; Stony Brook, NY	W 23–13	4,672
November 16	1:00 p.m.	Canisius*	Kenneth P. LaValle Stadium; Stony Brook, NY	W 42–7	1,767
*Non-conference game; All times are in Eastern time
