= 2002 Grambling State Tigers football team =

American college football season

2002 Grambling State Tigers football

Black college national champion SWAC champion

SWAC Championship Game, W 31–19 vs. Alabama A&M
- Conference: Southwestern Athletic Conference
- West Division

Ranking
- Sports Network: No. 8
- Record: 11–2 (6–1 SWAC)
- Head coach: Doug Williams (5th season)
- Offensive coordinator: Melvin Spears (5th season)
- Home stadium: Eddie G. Robinson Memorial Stadium

2002 Southwestern Athletic Conference football standings
	Conf.			Overall
Team	W		L	W		L
East Division
Alabama A&M xy	6	–	1	8	–	4
Jackson State	5	–	2	7	–	4
Alcorn State	3	–	4	6	–	5
Mississippi Valley State	3	–	4	5	–	6
Alabama State	2	–	5	6	–	6
West Division
No. 8 Grambling State xy$	6	–	1	11	–	2
Southern	5	–	2	6	–	6
Texas Southern	3	–	4	4	–	7
Arkansas–Pine Bluff	2	–	5	3	–	8
Prairie View A&M	0	–	7	1	–	10
Championship: Grambling State 31, Alabama A&M 19
$ – Conference champion; x – Division champion/co-champions; y – Championship game participant; Rankings from The Sports Network Poll

The 2002 Grambling State Tigers football team represented Grambling State University as a member of the Southwestern Athletic Conference (SWAC) during the 2002 NCAA Division I-AA football season. Led by fifth-year head coach Doug Williams, the Tigers compiled an overall record of 11–2 and a mark of 6–1 in conference play, won the SWAC championship, and a black college football national championship.

== Schedule ==
Date	Opponent	Rank	Site	Result	Attendance	Source
August 31	at No. 11 McNeese State*	No. 10	Cowboy Stadium; Lake Charles, LA	L 20–52	20,300	
September 7	Alcorn State	No. 18	Eddie G. Robinson Memorial Stadium; Grambling, LA	W 41–35	11,880	
September 14	at Alabama A&M	No. 20	Louis Crews Stadium; Normal, AL	W 23–13	8,785	
September 22	vs. Tennessee State*	No. 16	Sam Boyd Stadium; Whitney, NV (Silver Dollar Classic)	W 49–14	22,537	
September 28	Langston*	No. 15	Eddie G. Robinson Memorial Stadium; Grambling, LA	W 37–30	6,975	
October 5	vs. Prairie View A&M	No. 15	Cotton Bowl; Dallas, TX (rivalry)	W 35–13	42,622	
October 19	vs. Arkansas–Pine Bluff	No. 9	Independence Stadium; Shreveport, LA (Red River Classic)	W 54–15	11,017	
October 26	Jackson State	No. 7	Eddie G. Robinson Memorial Stadium; Grambling, LA	W 52–31	9,462	
November 2	at Texas Southern	No. 7	Reliant Astrodome; Houston, TX	W 42–28	10,635	
November 9	Alabama State	No. 7	Eddie G. Robinson Memorial Stadium; Grambling, LA	W 34–21	16,723	
November 16	at Morris Brown*	No. 6	Herndon Stadium; Atlanta, GA	W 64–36	8,653	
November 30	vs. Southern	No. 4	Louisiana Superdome; New Orleans, LA (Bayou Classic)	L 24–48	59,725	
December 14	vs. Alabama A&M	No. 8	Legion Field; Birmingham, AL (SWAC Championship Game)	W 31–19	23,727	
*Non-conference game; Rankings from The Sports Network Poll released prior to the game
