= 2002 UMass Minutemen football team =

American college football season

2002 UMass Minutemen football
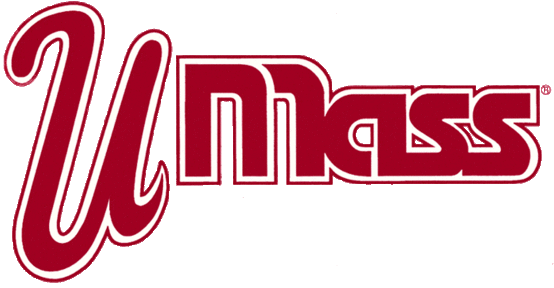
- Conference: Atlantic 10 Conference
- Record: 8–4 (6–3 A-10)
- Head coach: Mark Whipple (5th season)
- Offensive scheme: Pro-style
- Defensive coordinator: Neil McGrath (3rd season)
- Base defense: 4–3
- Home stadium: Warren McGuirk Alumni Stadium

2002 Atlantic 10 Conference football standings
	Conf.			Overall
Team	W		L	W		L
No. 6 Maine $^	7	–	2	11	–	3
No. 11 Northeastern $^	7	–	2	10	–	3
No. 4 Villanova ^	6	–	3	11	–	4
UMass	6	–	3	8	–	4
William & Mary	5	–	4	6	–	5
Richmond	4	–	5	4	–	7
Delaware	4	–	5	6	–	6
Hofstra	4	–	5	6	–	6
James Madison	4	–	6	5	–	7
New Hampshire	2	–	7	3	–	8
Rhode Island	1	–	8	3	–	9
+ – Conference co-champions; ^ – NCAA Division I-AA playoff participant; Rankings from The Sports Network poll

The 2002 UMass Minutemen football team represented the University of Massachusetts Amherst in the 2002 NCAA Division I-AA football season as a member of the Atlantic 10 Conference. The team was coached by Mark Whipple and played its home games at Warren McGuirk Alumni Stadium in Hadley, Massachusetts. The 2002 season saw UMass return to the top half of the conference, as they finished the season with a record of 8–4 overall and 6–3 in conference play.

== Schedule ==
Date	Time	Opponent	Rank	Site	TV	Result	Attendance	Source
September 7	1:00 p.m.	Central Connecticut State*		McGuirk Stadium; Hadley, MA		W 52–3	8,103	
September 14	1:00 p.m.	American International*		McGuirk Stadium; Hadley, MA		W 42–13	7,064	
September 21	12:30 p.m.	at No. 18 Northeastern		Parsons Field; Brookline, MA		L 17–42	6,651	
September 28	1:00 p.m.	at No. 17 (I-A) NC State*		Carter–Finley Stadium; Raleigh, NC		L 24–56	51,221	
October 5	3:00 p.m.	at Richmond		UR Stadium; Richmond, VA		W 34–13	6,927	
October 12	1:00 p.m.	No. 2 Maine^{†}		McGuirk Stadium; Hadley, MA		W 20–10	5,183	
October 19	1:00 p.m.	No. 4 Villanova	No. 20	McGuirk Stadium; Hadley, MA		W 17–16	11,208	
October 25	3:30 p.m.	at James Madison	No. 16	Bridgeforth Stadium; Harrisonburg, VA		W 14–7	11,567	
November 2	12:00 p.m.	Delaware	No. 13	McGuirk Stadium; Hadley, MA		W 17–7	11,553	
November 9	12:00 p.m.	at New Hampshire	No. 12	Cowell Stadium; Durham, NH (rivalry)		L 14–31	3,686	
November 16	12:00 p.m.	Hofstra	No. 19	McGuirk Stadium; Hadley, MA	A10 TV	L 28–31	5,090	
November 23	12:00 p.m.	at Rhode Island		Meade Stadium; Kingston, RI		W 48–21	2,501	
*Non-conference game; ^{†}Homecoming; Rankings from The Sports Network Poll released prior to the game; All times are in Eastern time
