= 2002 Bethune–Cookman Wildcats football team =

American college football season

2002 Bethune–Cookman Wildcats football

MEAC champion

NCAA Division I-AA First Round, L 0–34 at Georgia Southern
- Conference: Mid-Eastern Athletic Conference

Ranking
- Sports Network: No. 15
- Record: 11–2 (7–1 MEAC)
- Head coach: Alvin Wyatt (6th season)
- Defensive coordinator: Pete Adrian (5th season)
- Home stadium: Municipal Stadium

2002 Mid-Eastern Athletic Conference football standings
	Conf.			Overall
Team	W		L	W		L
No. 15 Bethune–Cookman $^	7	–	1	11	–	2
Florida A&M	5	–	3	7	–	5
Hampton	5	–	3	7	–	5
Morgan State	5	–	3	7	–	5
South Carolina State	4	–	4	7	–	5
Howard	4	–	4	6	–	5
Norfolk State	2	–	6	5	–	6
North Carolina A&T	2	–	6	4	–	8
Delaware State	2	–	6	4	–	8
$ – Conference champion; ^ – NCAA Division I-AA playoff participant; Rankings from The Sports Network poll

The 2002 Bethune–Cookman Wildcats football team was an American football team that represented Bethune-Cookman University as a member of the Mid-Eastern Athletic Conference (MEAC) during the 2002 NCAA Division I-AA football season. In its sixth season under head coach Alvin Wyatt, the team compiled an 11–2 record (7–1 against MEAC opponents) and won the MEAC championship. The team played its home games at Municipal Stadium in Daytona Beach, Florida.

On November 23, 2002, the team clinched the MEAC championship with a 37–10 victory over Florida A&M in the annual Florida Classic game before a crowd of 70,201 spectators in Orlando.

With an 11–1 record in the regular season, the team advanced to post-season play, losing to Georgia Southern in the Division I-AA 1st Round Playoff Game.

Bethune-Cookman was led on offense by junior quarterback Allen Suber. Suber missed the team's November 9 game against Hampton, leading to the team's only loss in the regular season.

== Schedule ==
Date	Opponent	Rank	Site	Result	Attendance	Source
August 31	vs. Savannah State*		Alltel Stadium; Jacksonville, FL	W 49–9		
September 7	at Florida Atlantic*		Pro Player Stadium; Miami Gardens, FL	W 30–17	7,987	
September 14	at Morris Brown*		Herndon Stadium; Atlanta, GA (Richard Allen Classic)	W 42–7	11,895	
September 21	FIU*	No. 24	Lockhart Stadium; Fort Lauderdale, FL	W 31–0		
September 28	Norfolk State	No. 20	Municipal Stadium; Daytona Beach, FL	W 49–7		
October 5	at Morgan State	No. 19	Hughes Stadium; Baltimore, MD	W 49–27		
October 12	Delaware State	No. 15	Municipal Stadium; Daytona Beach, FL	W 49–7	16,891	
October 19	at No. 18 South Carolina State	No. 11	Oliver C. Dawson Stadium; Orangeburg, SC	W 21–6	20,795	
November 2	at North Carolina A&T	No. 10	Aggie Stadium; Greensboro, NC	W 13–12	5,363	
November 9	at Hampton	No. 10	Armstrong Stadium; Hampton, VA	L 7–37		
November 16	Howard	No. 13	Municipal Stadium; Daytona Beach, FL	W 46–27	5,497	
November 23	vs. Florida A&M	No. 11	Florida Citrus Bowl; Orlando, FL (Florida Classic)	W 37–10	70,201	
November 30	at No. 2 Georgia Southern*	No. 11	Paulson Stadium; Statesboro, GA (NCAA Division I-AA First Round)	L 0–34	7,395	
*Non-conference game; Rankings from The Sports Network Poll released prior to the game

== Roster ==
2002 Bethune–Cookman Wildcats football team roster
Players			Coaches
Offense: Pos. / # / Name / Class; QB / 7 / Allen Suber / Jr	Defense: Pos. / # / Name / Class; DB / 16 / Rashean Mathis / Sr	Special teams: Pos. / # / Name / Class	Head coach: Alvin Wyatt; Coordinators/assistant coaches: Pete Adrian – Defensive coordinator; Legend: (C) Team captain; (S) Suspended; (I) Ineligible; Injured; Redshirt; Roster; Last update: 2002-08-26
