= 2002 James Madison Dukes football team =

American college football season

2002 James Madison Dukes football
- Conference: Atlantic 10 Conference
- Record: 5–7 (3–6 A-10)
- Head coach: Mickey Matthews (4th season)
- Defensive coordinator: Dick Hopkins (4th season)
- Home stadium: Bridgeforth Stadium

2002 Atlantic 10 Conference football standings
	Conf.			Overall
Team	W		L	W		L
No. 6 Maine $^	7	–	2	11	–	3
No. 11 Northeastern $^	7	–	2	10	–	3
No. 4 Villanova ^	6	–	3	11	–	4
UMass	6	–	3	8	–	4
William & Mary	5	–	4	6	–	5
Richmond	4	–	5	4	–	7
Delaware	4	–	5	6	–	6
Hofstra	4	–	5	6	–	6
James Madison	4	–	6	5	–	7
New Hampshire	2	–	7	3	–	8
Rhode Island	1	–	8	3	–	9
+ – Conference co-champions; ^ – NCAA Division I-AA playoff participant; Rankings from The Sports Network poll

The 2002 James Madison Dukes football team was an American football team that represented James Madison University during the 2002 NCAA Division I-AA football season as a member of the Atlantic 10 Conference. In their fourth year under head coach Mickey Matthews, the team compiled a 5–7 record.

== Schedule ==
Date	Opponent	Rank	Site	Result	Attendance	Source
August 31	Hampton*		Bridgeforth Stadium; Harrisonburg, VA	L 28–31	10,143	
September 7	New Hampshire		Bridgeforth Stadium; Harrisonburg, VA	W 20–14	7,831	
September 14	Florida Atlantic*		Bridgeforth Stadium; Harrisburg, VA	W 16–13	7,982	
September 21	at No. 12 Hofstra		James M. Shuart Stadium; Hempstead, NY	W 24–21 ^{2OT}	2,902	
September 28	No. 8 Villanova	No. 23	Bridgeforth Stadium; Harrisonburg, VA	L 26–30	9,153	
October 5	No. 3 Maine		Bridgeforth Stadium; Harrisonburg, VA	L 6–17	14,728	
October 12	at Delaware		Delaware Stadium; Newark, DE (rivalry)	L 10–23	19,666	
October 19	at Richmond		UR Stadium; Richmond, VA (Rivalry)	L 0–26	8,113	
October 25	No. 16 UMass		Bridgeforth Stadium; Harrisonburg, VA	L 7–14	11,567	
November 2	at Rhode Island		Meade Stadium; Kingston, RI	W 15–11	3,966	
November 16	No. 16 William & Mary		Bridgeforth Stadium; Harrisonburg, VA (rivalry)	W 34–31 ^{OT}	8,237	
November 23	at No. 10 Northeastern		Parsons Field; Brookline, MA	L 10–41	4,825	
*Non-conference game; Rankings from The Sports Network Poll released prior to the game
