= 2002 Hampton Pirates football team =

American college football season

2002 Hampton Pirates football
- Conference: Mid-Eastern Athletic Conference
- Record: 7–5 (5–3 MEAC)
- Head coach: Joe Taylor (11th season)
- Home stadium: Armstrong Stadium

2002 Mid-Eastern Athletic Conference football standings
| | Conf. | | | Overall |
| Team | W | | L | W | | L |
|---|---|---|---|---|---|---|
| No. 15 Bethune–Cookman $^ | 7 | – | 1 | 11 | – | 2 |
| Florida A&M | 5 | – | 3 | 7 | – | 5 |
| Hampton | 5 | – | 3 | 7 | – | 5 |
| Morgan State | 5 | – | 3 | 7 | – | 5 |
| South Carolina State | 4 | – | 4 | 7 | – | 5 |
| Howard | 4 | – | 4 | 6 | – | 5 |
| Norfolk State | 2 | – | 6 | 5 | – | 6 |
| North Carolina A&T | 2 | – | 6 | 4 | – | 8 |
| Delaware State | 2 | – | 6 | 4 | – | 8 |
$ – Conference champion; ^ – NCAA Division I-AA playoff participant; Rankings from The Sports Network poll

The 2002 Hampton Pirates football team represented Hampton University as a member of the Mid-Eastern Athletic Conference (MEAC) during the 2002 NCAA Division I-AA football season. Led by 11th-year head coach Joe Taylor, the Pirates compiled an overall record of 7–5, with a mark of 5–3 in conference play, and finished tied for second in the MEAC.

== Schedule ==
| Date | Opponent | Rank | Site | Result | Attendance | Source |
|---|---|---|---|---|---|---|
| August 31 | at James Madison* | No. 25 | Bridgeforth Stadium; Harrisonburg, VA | W 31–28 | 10,143 | |
| September 7 | Southwest Missouri State* | No. 23 | Armstrong Stadium; Hampton, VA | L 26–28 | 4,207 | |
| September 14 | Howard | | Armstrong Stadium; Hampton, VA (rivalry) | W 51–2 | 19,021 | |
| September 21 | vs. Alcorn State* | | Giants Stadium; East Rutherford, NJ (New York Urban League Classic) | L 23–27 | 30,232 | |
| October 5 | at Delaware State | | Alumni Stadium; Dover, DE | W 44–13 | | |
| October 12 | Bowie State*^{†} | | Armstrong Stadium; Hampton, VA | W 49–0 | 13,237 | |
| October 19 | Norfolk State | | Armstrong Stadium; Hampton, VA (rivalry) | W 31–14 | 18,232 | |
| October 26 | at No. 21 South Carolina State | | Oliver C. Dawson Stadium; Orangeburg, SC | L 41–47 ^{2OT} | 5,507 | |
| November 2 | at Florida A&M | | Bragg Memorial Stadium; Tallahassee, FL | L 13–25 | 29,065 | |
| November 9 | No. 10 Bethune–Cookman | | Armstrong Stadium; Hampton, VA | W 7–37 | | |
| November 16 | North Carolina A&T | | Armstrong Stadium; Hampton, VA | W 17–7 | 2,350 | |
| November 23 | at Morgan State | | Hughes Stadium; Baltimore, MD | L 42–52 | 4,362 | |
*Non-conference game; ^{†}Homecoming; Rankings from The Sports Network Poll released prior to the game
