= 2002 Maine Black Bears football team =

American college football season

2002 Maine Black Bears football

A-10 co-champion

NCAA Division I-AA Quarterfinal, L 7–31 at Georgia Southern
- Conference: Atlantic 10 Conference

Ranking
- Sports Network: No. 6
- Record: 11–3 (7–2 A-10)
- Head coach: Jack Cosgrove (10th season)
- Offensive coordinator: Bobby Wilder (3rd season)
- Defensive coordinator: Rich Nagy (2nd season)
- Captains: Stephen Cooper; Brendan Curry; Jake Eaton
- Home stadium: Alfond Stadium

2002 Atlantic 10 Conference football standings
	Conf.			Overall
Team	W		L	W		L
No. 6 Maine $^	7	–	2	11	–	3
No. 11 Northeastern $^	7	–	2	10	–	3
No. 4 Villanova ^	6	–	3	11	–	4
UMass	6	–	3	8	–	4
William & Mary	5	–	4	6	–	5
Richmond	4	–	5	4	–	7
Delaware	4	–	5	6	–	6
Hofstra	4	–	5	6	–	6
James Madison	4	–	6	5	–	7
New Hampshire	2	–	7	3	–	8
Rhode Island	1	–	8	3	–	9
+ – Conference co-champions; ^ – NCAA Division I-AA playoff participant; Rankings from The Sports Network poll

The 2002 Maine Black Bears football team represented the University of Maine during the 2002 NCAA Division I-AA football season. It was the program's 111th season and they finished in a tie as Atlantic 10 Conference (A-10) co-champions with Northeastern. The Black Bears earned a berth into the 16-team Division I-AA playoffs, but lost in the quarterfinals to Georgia Southern, 7–31. Maine was led by 10th-year head coach Jack Cosgrove.

== Schedule ==
Date	Time	Opponent	Rank	Site	Result	Attendance	Source
August 31		Central Connecticut*	No. 13	Fitzpatrick Stadium; Portland, ME	W 52–3	5,710	
September 7	6:00 p.m.	No. 10 William & Mary	No. 11	Alfond Stadium; Orono, ME	W 27–14	6,326	
September 14	6:00 p.m.	at No. 11 Villanova	No. 6	Villanova Stadium; Villanova, PA	W 21–14	8,515	
September 21	12:00 p.m.	at Howard*	No. 4	William H. Greene Stadium; Washington, DC	W 42–12	2,518	
September 28		Rhode Island	No. 3	Alfond Stadium; Orono, ME	W 31–14	7,034	
October 5	12:00 p.m.	at James Madison	No. 3	Bridgeforth Stadium; Harrisonburg, VA	W 17–6	14,728	
October 12	1:00 p.m.	at UMass	No. 2	McGuirk Stadium; Hadley, MA	L 10–20	5,183	
October 19	3:30 p.m.	at FIU*	No. 8	FIU Stadium; Miami, FL	W 33–7	5,303	
October 26	12:00 p.m.	Hofstra	No. 6	Alfond Stadium; Orono, ME	W 24–17		
November 9	12:00 p.m.	Delaware	No. 5	Alfond Stadium; Orono, ME	L 13–37	4,792	
November 16	1:00 p.m.	at Richmond	No. 11	UR Stadium; Richmond, VA	W 21–14	3,554	
November 23		New Hampshire	No. 9	Alfond Stadium; Orono, ME (Battle for the Brice–Cowell Musket)	W 31–14		
November 30	1:00 p.m.	at No. 5 Appalachian State*	No. 7	Kidd Brewer Stadium; Boone, NC (NCAA Division I-AA First Round)	W 14–13	4,311	
December 7		at No. 3 Georgia Southern*	No. 6	Paulson Stadium; Statesboro, GA (NCAA Division I-AA Quarterfinal)	L 7–31	6,708	
*Non-conference game; Rankings from The Sports Network Poll released prior to the game; All times are in Eastern time

== Awards and honors ==
- All-America – Stephen Cooper (Associated Press)
- First Team All-Atlantic 10 – Stephen Cooper, David Cusano, Dennis Dottin-Carter
- Second Team All-Atlantic 10 – Brendan Curry, Matt Hammond, Peter Richardson, Marcus Williams
- Third Team All-Atlantic 10 – Jake Eaton
- Atlantic 10 Defensive Player of the Year – Stephen Cooper
