= 2002 La Salle Explorers football team =

American college football season

2002 La Salle Explorers football
- Conference: Metro Atlantic Athletic Conference
- Record: 2–9 (2–6 MAAC)
- Head coach: Archie Stalcup (1st season)
- Home stadium: McCarthy Stadium

2002 Metro Atlantic Athletic Conference football standings
	Conf.			Overall
Team	W		L	W		L
Duquesne $	8	–	0	11	–	1
Marist	5	–	3	7	–	4
Saint Peter's	5	–	3	6	–	5
Fairfield	5	–	3	5	–	6
Iona	4	–	4	5	–	6
Siena	3	–	5	3	–	7
St. John's	2	–	6	2	–	8
Canisius	2	–	6	2	–	9
La Salle	2	–	6	2	–	9
$ – Conference champion

The 2002 La Salle Explorers football team was an American football team that represented La Salle University as a member of the Metro Atlantic Athletic Conference (MAAC) during the 2002 NCAA Division I-AA football season. In their first year, under head coach Archie Stalcup, the Explorers compiled a 2–9 record.

== Schedule ==
Date	Opponent	Site	Result	Attendance	Source
September 7	Wagner*	McCarthy Stadium; Philadelphia, PA	L 7–42	2,523	
September 14	Fairfield	McCarthy Stadium; Philadelphia, PA	L 14–25	1,856	
September 21	at Saint Peter's	Cochrane Stadium; Jersey City, NJ	L 2–55	3,126	
September 28	Siena	McCarthy Stadium; Philadelphia, PA	W 28–21	2,115	
October 5	at Catholic University*	Cardinal Stadium; Washington, DC	L 15–26	2,100	
October 12	at Canisius	Demske Field; Buffalo, NY	L 27–30		
October 19	at Iona	Mazzella Field; New Rochelle, NY	L 23–30		
October 26	Duquesne	McCarthy Stadium; Philadelphia, PA	L 0–46		
November 2	Saint Francis (PA)*	McCarthy Stadium; Philadelphia, PA	L 16–23	764	
November 9	Marist	McCarthy Stadium; Philadelphia, PA	L 23–49		
November 16	at St. John's	DaSilva Field; Queens, NY	W 45–41	606	
*Non-conference game
