= 2002 NCAA Division I-AA football season =

American college football season

2002 NCAA Division I-AA season

Regular season
- Number of teams: 123
- Duration: August–November
- Payton Award: Tony Romo (QB, Eastern Illinois)
- Buchanan Award: Rashean Mathis (FC, Bethune-Cookman)

Playoff
- Duration: November 30–December 20
- Championship date: December 20, 2002
- Championship site: Finley Stadium; Chattanooga, Tennessee
- Champion: Western Kentucky

NCAA Division I-AA football seasons
- «2001 2003»

The 2002 NCAA Division I-AA football season, part of college football in the United States organized by the National Collegiate Athletic Association (NCAA) at the Division I-AA level, began in August 2002, and concluded with the 2002 NCAA Division I-AA Football Championship Game on December 20, 2002, at Finley Stadium in Chattanooga, Tennessee. The Western Kentucky Hilltoppers won their first I-AA championship, defeating the McNeese State Cowboys by a final score of 34−14.

== Conference changes and new programs ==
- Prior to the 2002 season, the Big South Conference began to sponsor football at the Division I-AA level.

School	2001 Conference	2002 Conference
Cal State Northridge	I-AA Independent	Dropped Program
Charleston Southern	I-AA Independent	Big South
Elon	I-AA Independent	Big South
FIU	New Program	I-AA Independent
Gardner-Webb	D-II Independent	Big South
Liberty	I-AA Independent	Big South
St. John's (NY)	Northeast	MAAC

== Conference standings ==
2002 Atlantic 10 Conference football standings
	Conf.			Overall
Team	W		L	W		L
No. 6 Maine $^	7	–	2	11	–	3
No. 11 Northeastern $^	7	–	2	10	–	3
No. 4 Villanova ^	6	–	3	11	–	4
UMass	6	–	3	8	–	4
William & Mary	5	–	4	6	–	5
Richmond	4	–	5	4	–	7
Delaware	4	–	5	6	–	6
Hofstra	4	–	5	6	–	6
James Madison	4	–	6	5	–	7
New Hampshire	2	–	7	3	–	8
Rhode Island	1	–	8	3	–	9
+ – Conference co-champions; ^ – NCAA Division I-AA playoff participant; Rankings from The Sports Network poll

2002 Big Sky Conference football standings
	Conf.			Overall
Team	W		L	W		L
No. 7 Montana +^	5	–	2	11	–	3
No. 19 Montana State +^	5	–	2	7	–	6
No. 18 Idaho State +	5	–	2	8	–	3
Eastern Washington	3	–	4	6	–	5
Northern Arizona	3	–	4	6	–	5
Portland State	3	–	4	6	–	5
Sacramento State	3	–	4	5	–	8
Weber State	1	–	6	3	–	8
+ – Conference co-champions; ^ – NCAA Division I-AA playoff participant; Rankings from The Sports Network poll

2002 Big South Conference football standings
	Conf.			Overall
Team	W		L	W		L
No. 22 Gardner–Webb $	3	–	0	9	–	1
Elon	2	–	1	4	–	7
Liberty	1	–	2	2	–	9
Charleston Southern	0	–	3	4	–	8
$ – Conference champion; Rankings from The Sports Network poll

2002 Gateway Football Conference standings
	Conf.			Overall
Team	W		L	W		L
No. 1 Western Kentucky +^	6	–	1	12	–	3
No. 5 Western Illinois +^	6	–	1	11	–	2
Youngstown State	4	–	3	7	–	4
Illinois State	4	–	3	6	–	5
Indiana State	3	–	4	5	–	7
Northern Iowa	2	–	5	5	–	6
Southern Illinois	2	–	5	4	–	8
Southwest Missouri State	1	–	6	4	–	7
+ – Conference co-champions; ^ – NCAA Division I-AA playoff participant; Rankings from The Sports Network poll

2002 Ivy League football standings
	Conf.			Overall
Team	W		L	W		L
No. 17 Penn $	7	–	0	9	–	1
Harvard	6	–	1	7	–	3
Princeton	4	–	3	6	–	4
Yale	4	–	3	6	–	4
Cornell	3	–	4	4	–	6
Dartmouth	2	–	5	3	–	7
Brown	2	–	5	2	–	8
Columbia	0	–	7	1	–	9
$ – Conference champion; Rankings from The Sports Network poll

2002 Metro Atlantic Athletic Conference football standings
	Conf.			Overall
Team	W		L	W		L
Duquesne $	8	–	0	11	–	1
Marist	5	–	3	7	–	4
Saint Peter's	5	–	3	6	–	5
Fairfield	5	–	3	5	–	6
Iona	4	–	4	5	–	6
Siena	3	–	5	3	–	7
St. John's	2	–	6	2	–	8
Canisius	2	–	6	2	–	9
La Salle	2	–	6	2	–	9
$ – Conference champion

2002 Mid-Eastern Athletic Conference football standings
	Conf.			Overall
Team	W		L	W		L
No. 15 Bethune–Cookman $^	7	–	1	11	–	2
Florida A&M	5	–	3	7	–	5
Hampton	5	–	3	7	–	5
Morgan State	5	–	3	7	–	5
South Carolina State	4	–	4	7	–	5
Howard	4	–	4	6	–	5
Norfolk State	2	–	6	5	–	6
North Carolina A&T	2	–	6	4	–	8
Delaware State	2	–	6	4	–	8
$ – Conference champion; ^ – NCAA Division I-AA playoff participant; Rankings from The Sports Network poll

2002 Northeast Conference football standings
	Conf.			Overall
Team	W		L	W		L
Albany $	6	–	1	8	–	4
Stony Brook	5	–	2	8	–	2
Sacred Heart	5	–	2	7	–	3
Wagner	4	–	3	7	–	4
Central Connecticut State	3	–	4	5	–	6
Robert Morris	2	–	5	3	–	4
Monmouth	2	–	5	2	–	8
Saint Francis (PA)	1	–	6	2	–	8
$ – Conference champion

2002 Ohio Valley Conference football standings
	Conf.			Overall
Team	W		L	W		L
No. 13 Eastern Illinois +^	5	–	1	8	–	4
No. 20 Murray State +^	5	–	1	7	–	5
No. 21 Eastern Kentucky	4	–	2	8	–	4
No. 24 Southeast Missouri State	4	–	2	8	–	4
Tennessee Tech	2	–	4	5	–	7
Tennessee State	1	–	5	2	–	10
Tennessee–Martin	0	–	6	2	–	10
+ – Conference co-champions; ^ – NCAA Division I-AA playoff participant; Rankings from The Sports Network poll

2002 Patriot League football standings
	Conf.			Overall
Team	W		L	W		L
No. 12 Fordham +^	6	–	1	10	–	3
No. 25 Colgate +	6	–	1	9	–	3
Lafayette	5	–	2	7	–	5
Lehigh	4	–	3	8	–	4
Towson	3	–	4	6	–	5
Georgetown	2	–	5	5	–	6
Holy Cross	2	–	5	4	–	8
Bucknell	0	–	7	2	–	9
+ – Conference co-champions; ^ – NCAA Division I-AA playoff participant; Rankings from The Sports Network poll

2002 Pioneer Football League standings
	Conf.			Overall
Team	W		L	W		L
North Division
Dayton xy$	4	–	0	11	–	1
San Diego	3	–	1	5	–	5
Butler	2	–	2	4	–	6
Drake	1	–	3	5	–	6
Valparaiso	0	–	4	1	–	10
South Division
Morehead State xy	3	–	0	9	–	3
Davidson	2	–	1	7	–	3
Austin Peay	1	–	2	7	–	5
Jacksonville	0	–	3	3	–	7
Championship: Dayton 28, Morehead State 0
$ – Conference champion; x – Division champion/co-champions; y – Championship game participant

2002 Southern Conference football standings
	Conf.			Overall
Team	W		L	W		L
No. 3 Georgia Southern $^	7	–	1	11	–	3
No. 14 Wofford	6	–	2	9	–	3
No. 10 Appalachian State ^	6	–	2	8	–	4
No. 9 Furman ^	6	–	2	8	–	4
VMI	3	–	5	6	–	6
Western Carolina	3	–	5	5	–	6
East Tennessee State	2	–	6	4	–	8
Chattanooga	2	–	6	2	–	10
The Citadel	1	–	7	3	–	9
$ – Conference champion; ^ – NCAA Division I-AA playoff participant; Rankings from The Sports Network poll

2002 Southland Football League standings
	Conf.			Overall
Team	W		L	W		L
No. 2 McNeese State $^	6	–	0	13	–	2
No. 16 Northwestern State ^	4	–	2	9	–	4
No. 23 Nicholls State	3	–	3	7	–	4
Stephen F. Austin	3	–	3	6	–	5
Jacksonville State	2	–	4	5	–	6
Sam Houston State	2	–	4	4	–	7
Southwest Texas State	1	–	5	4	–	7
$ – Conference champion; ^ – NCAA Division I-AA playoff participant; Rankings from The Sports Network poll

2002 Southwestern Athletic Conference football standings
	Conf.			Overall
Team	W		L	W		L
East Division
Alabama A&M xy	6	–	1	8	–	4
Jackson State	5	–	2	7	–	4
Alcorn State	3	–	4	6	–	5
Mississippi Valley State	3	–	4	5	–	6
Alabama State	2	–	5	6	–	6
West Division
No. 8 Grambling State xy$	6	–	1	11	–	2
Southern	5	–	2	6	–	6
Texas Southern	3	–	4	4	–	7
Arkansas–Pine Bluff	2	–	5	3	–	8
Prairie View A&M	0	–	7	1	–	10
Championship: Grambling State 31, Alabama A&M 19
$ – Conference champion; x – Division champion/co-champions; y – Championship game participant; Rankings from The Sports Network Poll

2002 NCAA Division I-AA independents football standings
	Conf.			Overall
Team	W		L	W		L
Saint Mary's		–		6	–	6
FIU		–		5	–	6
Samford		–		4	–	7
Cal Poly		–		3	–	8
Florida Atlantic		–		2	–	9
Savannah State		–		1	–	8
Southern Utah		–		1	–	10
Morris Brown		–		1	–	11

== Conference champions ==
Conference Champions

Atlantic 10 Conference – Maine and Northeastern
Big Sky Conference – Idaho State, Montana, and Montana State
Big South Conference – Gardner-Webb
Gateway Football Conference – Western Illinois and Western Kentucky
Ivy League – Penn
Metro Atlantic Athletic Conference – Duquesne
Mid-Eastern Athletic Conference – Bethune-Cookman
Northeast Conference – Albany (NY)
Ohio Valley Conference – Eastern Illinois and Murray State
Patriot League – Colgate and Fordham
Pioneer Football League – Dayton
Southern Conference – Georgia Southern
Southland Football League – McNeese State
Southwestern Athletic Conference – Grambling State

== Postseason ==
=== NCAA Division I-AA playoff bracket ===
The top four teams in the tournament were seeded; seeded teams were assured of hosting games in the first two rounds.

First Round; November 30; Campus sites
1	McNeese State*	21
Montana State	14
Montana*	45
Northwestern State	14
Villanova*	45
Furman	38
4	Northeastern*	24
Fordham	29
3	Georgia Southern*	34
Bethune–Cookman	0
Appalachian State*	13
Maine	14
Western Kentucky*	59
Murray State	20
2	Western Illinois*	48
Eastern Illinois	9

Quarterfinals; December 7 Campus sites
1	McNeese State*	24
Montana	20
Villanova*	24
Fordham	10
3	Georgia Southern*	31
Maine	7
Western Kentucky	31
2	Western Illinois*	28

Semifinals; December 14; Campus sites
1	McNeese State*	39
Villanova	28
3	Georgia Southern*	28
Western Kentucky	31

National Championship Game; December 20; Finley Stadium; Chattanooga, TN
1	McNeese State	14
Western Kentucky	34

* Denotes host institution

== Awards and honors ==
=== Walter Payton Award voting ===
The Walter Payton Award is given to the year's most outstanding player

Player	School	Position	1st	2nd	3rd	4th	5th	Total
Tony Romo	Eastern Illinois	QB	24	15	18	12	10	268
Brett Gordon	Villanova	QB	18	18	17	10	12	245
Bruce Eugene	Grambling State	QB	21	16	7	17	10	234
John Edwards	Montana	QB	12	11	13	13	8	177
Willie Ponder	Southeast Missouri State	WR	1	7	7	14	12	94
Chas Gessner	Brown	WR	5	6	6	7	9	90
Carl Morris	Harvard	WR	6	4	5	7	6.5	81.5
Chaz Williams	Georgia Southern	RB	3	8	6	5	5	80
Allen Suber	Bethune–Cookman	QB	7	4	4	2	4	71
Kirwin Watson	Fordham	RB	3	5	6	2	10	67
P. J. Mays	Youngstown State	RB	2	5	2	5	6	52
Billy Napier	Furman	QB	2	4	5	2	2	47
Stephan Lewis	New Hampshire	RB	1	4	4	4	4	45
David Corley Jr.	William & Mary	QB	1	1	4	3	5	32
Ryan Johnson	Montana State	RB	2	0	3	1	2	23
Ryan Fuqua	Portland State	RB	0	1	2	3	2.5	18.5
Jay Bailey	Austin Peay	RB	1	0	0	0	0	5
Doug Baughman	Idaho State	QB	0	0	0	1	0	2
