= 2002 NCAA Division I-AA football rankings =

The 2002 NCAA Division I-AA football rankings are from the Sports Network poll of Division I-AA head coaches, athletic directors, sports information directors and media members. This is for the 2002 season.

== Legend ==
	Increase in ranking
	Decrease in ranking
	Not ranked previous week
(#–#)	Win–loss record
(Italics)	Number of first place votes
т	Tied with team above or below also with this symbol

== The Sports Network poll ==
	Preseason	Week 1 Sept 3	Week 2 Sept 10	Week 3 Sept 17	Week 4 Sept 24	Week 5 Oct 1	Week 6 Oct 8	Week 7 Oct 15	Week 8 Oct 22	Week 9 Oct 29	Week 10 Nov 5	Week 11 Nov 12	Week 12 Nov 19	Week 13 Nov 26	Week 14 Postseason	
1.	Montana (79)	Montana (1–0) (85)	Montana (2–0) (106)	Montana (3–0) (115)	Montana (4–0) (99)	Montana (4–0) (95)	Montana (5–0) (97)	Montana (6–0) (99)	Montana (7–0) (100)	Montana (8–0) (99)	Montana (9–0) (95)	Montana (10–0) (95)	McNeese State (9–1) (88)	McNeese State (10–1) (77)	Western Kentucky (12–3) (41)	1.
2.	Appalachian State	Northern Iowa (1–0)	Lehigh (2–0) (3)	McNeese State (3–0) (4)	McNeese State (3–0) (6)	McNeese State (4–0) (10)	Maine (6–0) (1)	McNeese State (4–1) (1)	McNeese State (5–1) (2)	McNeese State (6–1) (6)	McNeese State (7–1) (8)	McNeese State (8–1) (6)	Eastern Illinois (8–2) (1)	Georgia Southern (9–2) (3)	McNeese State (13–2) (4)	2.
3.	Northern Iowa	Lehigh (1–0) (2)	McNeese State (2–0)	Lehigh (2–0) (1)	Maine (4–0)	Maine (5–0)	McNeese State (4–1) (2)	Appalachian State (5–1) (2)	Northwestern State (6–1)	Northwestern State (7–1)	Northwestern State (8–1)	Eastern Illinois (7–2)	Georgia Southern (9–2) (3)	Western Illinois (10–1)	Georgia Southern (11–3)	3.
4.	Eastern Illinois (1)	Furman (0–0) (2)	Northern Iowa (1–1)	Maine (3–0)	Lehigh (3–0) (1)	Appalachian State (3–1)	Appalachian State (4–1)	Villanova (6–1)	Furman (5–2)	Furman (6–2)	Furman (6–2)	Georgia Southern (8–2)	Montana (10–1) (4)	Grambling State (10–1)	Villanova (11–4)	4.
5.	Georgia Southern (3)	Appalachian State (0–1)	Appalachian State (0–1)	Appalachian State (1–1)	Appalachian State (2–1)	Furman (3–1)	Furman (4–1)	Northwestern State (5–1)	Eastern Illinois (5–2)	Maine (8–1)	Maine (8–1)	Western Illinois (9–1)	Western Illinois (10–1) (1)	Appalachian State (8–3)	Western Illinois (11–2)	5.
6.	Lehigh (1)	McNeese State (1–0)	Maine (2–0)	Northern Iowa (1–1)	Northern Iowa (2–1)	Northern Iowa (3–1)	Villanova (5–1)	Furman (4–2)	Maine (7–1)	Eastern Illinois (5–2)	Eastern Illinois (6–2)	Grambling State (9–1)	Grambling State (10–1) (1)	Furman (8–3)	Maine (11–3)	6.
7.	Furman (3)	Eastern Illinois (0–1)	Furman (0–1)	Furman (1–1)	Furman (2–1)	Villanova (4–1)	Northwestern State (4–1)	Eastern Illinois (4–2)	Grambling State (6–1)	Grambling State (7–1)	Grambling State (8–1)	Northwestern State (8–2)	Appalachian State (8–3)	Maine (10–2)	Montana (11–3)	7.
8.	Youngstown State	Youngstown State (1–0)	Eastern Illinois (0–1)	Portland State (2–0)	Villanova (3–1)	Western Illinois (4–0)	Northern Arizona (4–1)	Maine (6–1)	Appalachian State (5–2)	Western Illinois (7–1)	Western Illinois (8–1)	Appalachian State (7–3)	Furman (7–3)	Northeastern (10–2)	Grambling State (11–2)	8.
9.	William & Mary	Delaware (1–0)	Georgia Southern (1–1)	Georgia Southern (1–1)	Portland State (2–1)	Northwestern State (3–1)	Eastern Illinois (3–2)	Grambling State (5–1)	Western Illinois (6–1)	Georgia Southern (6–2)	Georgia Southern (7–2)	Furman (6–3)	Maine (9–2)	Montana (10–2)	Furman (8–4)	9.
10.	Grambling State	William & Mary (0–1)	Portland State (1–0)	Northwestern State (3–0)	Northwestern State (3–1)	Florida A&M (4–1)	Lehigh (4–1)	Western Illinois (5–1)	Georgia Southern (5–2)	Bethune–Cookman (8–0)	Bethune–Cookman (9–0) (1)	Wofford (8–2)	Northeastern (9–2)	Eastern Illinois (8–3)	Appalachian State (8–4)	10.
11.	McNeese State	Maine (1–0)	Villanova (2–0)	Youngstown State (1–1)	Florida A&M (3–1)	Northeastern (4–0)	Grambling State (5–1)	Bethune–Cookman (7–0)	Bethune–Cookman (8–0)	Villanova (6–2)	Villanova (7–2)	Maine (8–2)	Bethune–Cookman (10–1) (2)	Bethune–Cookman (11–1)	Northeastern (10–3)	11.
12.	Sam Houston State	Georgia Southern (0–1)	Youngstown State (1–1)	Hofstra (2–1)	Western Illinois (3–0)	Northern Arizona (3–1)	Northern Iowa (3–2)	Portland State (4–2)	Villanova (6–2)	William & Mary (5–2)	UMass (7–2)	Northeastern (8–2)	Northwestern State (8–3)	Villanova (9–3)	Fordham (10–3)	12.
13.	Maine	Portland State (1–0)	Northwestern State (2–0)	Eastern Illinois (0–2)	Eastern Illinois (1–2)	Eastern Illinois (2–2)	Western Illinois (4–1)	Georgia Southern (4–2)	Portland State (5–2)	UMass (6–2)	Portland State (6–3)	Bethune–Cookman (9–1)	Villanova (8–3)	Northwestern State (9–3)	Eastern Illinois (8–4)	13.
14.	Eastern Kentucky	Sam Houston State (0–1)	Sam Houston State (1–1)	Villanova (2–1)	Northeastern (3–0)	Lehigh (3–1)	Portland State (3–2)	William & Mary (3–2)	William & Mary (4–2)	Appalachian State (5–3)	Appalachian State (6–3)	Villanova (7–3)	Wofford (8–3)	Wofford (9–3)	Wofford (9–3)	14.
15.	Hofstra	Villanova (1–0)	Delaware (1–1)	Florida A&M (2–1)	Grambling State (3–1)	Grambling State (4–1)	Bethune–Cookman (6–0)	Northeastern (5–1)	Northeastern (6–1)	Portland State (5–3)	Wofford (7–2)	Western Kentucky (7–3)	Western Kentucky (8–3)	Western Kentucky (8–3)	Bethune–Cookman (11–2)	15.
16.	Florida A&M	Northwestern State (1–0)	Eastern Kentucky (1–1)	Grambling State (2–1)	Northern Arizona (2–1)	Portland State (2–2)	Georgia Southern (3–2)	Northern Arizona (4–2)	UMass (5–2)	Lehigh (6–2)	Lehigh (7–2)	William & Mary (6–3)	Penn (8–1)	Penn (9–1)	Northwestern State (9–4)	16.
17.	Portland State	Eastern Kentucky (0–1)	Hofstra (1–1)	William & Mary (1–2)	William & Mary (1–2)	William & Mary (2–2)	William & Mary (2–2)	Youngstown State (4–2)	Northern Iowa (4–3)	Eastern Kentucky (6–3)	Eastern Kentucky (7–3)	Penn (7–1)	Nicholls State (7–3)	Idaho State (8–3) (1)	Penn (9–1)	17.
18.	Western Kentucky	Grambling State (0–1)	William & Mary (0–2)	Northeastern (2–0)	Georgia Southern (1–2)	Georgia Southern (2–2)	Wofford (4–1)	South Carolina State (5–1)	Lehigh (5–2)	Wofford (6–2)	Northeastern (7–2)	Nicholls State (7–3)	Idaho State (7–3)	Gardner–Webb (9–1)	Idaho State (8–3)	18.
19.	Northwestern State	Montana State (1–0)	Florida A&M (1–1)	Northern Arizona (2–1)	Wofford (3–0)	Bethune–Cookman (5–0)	Eastern Kentucky (4–2)	Lehigh (4–2)	Eastern Kentucky (5–3)	Idaho State (5–2)	Western Kentucky (7–3)	UMass (7–3)	Gardner–Webb (9–1)	Eastern Kentucky (8–4)	Montana State (7–6)	19.
20.	Montana State	Hofstra (0–1)	Grambling State (1–1)	Western Illinois (2–0)	Bethune–Cookman (4–0)	Wofford (3–1)	Northeastern (4–1)	UMass (4–2)	Idaho State (4–2)	Northeastern (6–2)	William & Mary (5–3)	Idaho State (6–3)	Lehigh (8–3)	Nicholls State (7–4)	Murray State (7–5)	20.
21.	Northern Arizona	Florida A&M (0–1)	Western Kentucky (1–1)	Eastern Kentucky (1–2)	Eastern Kentucky (2–2)	Eastern Kentucky (3–2)	Florida A&M (4–2)	Northern Iowa (3–3)	South Carolina State (5–2)	South Carolina State (6–2)	Penn (6–1)	Portland State (6–4)	Duquesne (11–0)	Fordham (9–2)	Eastern Kentucky (8–4)	21.
22.	Delaware	Western Kentucky (0–1)	Northeastern (2–0)	Richmond (1–1)	Youngstown State (1–2)	Youngstown State (2–2)	Youngstown State (3–2)	Eastern Kentucky (4–3)	Nicholls State (6–2)	Western Kentucky (6–3)	Nicholls State (6–3)	Gardner–Webb (8–1)	Eastern Kentucky (7–4)	Southeast Missouri State (8–4)	Gardner–Webb (9–1)	22.
23.	Harvard	Hampton (1–0)	Richmond (1–1)	Holy Cross (2–0)	James Madison (3–1)	Penn (2–0)	Nicholls State (5–1)	Stephen F. Austin (4–2)	Youngstown State (4–3)	Nicholls State (6–3)	Idaho State (5–3)	Lehigh (7–3)	William & Mary (6–4)	Murray State (7–4)	Nicholls State (7–4)	23.
24.	Jacksonville State	Jacksonville State (1–0)	Jacksonville State (1–0)	Bethune–Cookman (3–0)	Hofstra (2–2)	Nicholls State (4–1)	Penn (3–0)	Idaho State (4–2)	Western Kentucky (5–3)	Penn (5–1)	Florida A&M (7–3)	Duquesne (10–0)	Southeast Missouri State (8–4)	Montana State (7–5)	Southeast Missouri State (8–4)	24.
25.	Hampton	Harvard (0–0)	Holy Cross (1–0)	Alabama State (3–0)	Western Kentucky (2–2)	Harvard (2–0)	South Carolina State (4–1)	Southern Illinois (4–3)	Wofford (5–2)	Illinois State (5–3)	Gardner–Webb (7–1)	Eastern Kentucky (7–4)	Fordham (8–2)	Colgate (9–3)	Colgate (9–3)	25.
	Preseason	Week 1 Sept 3	Week 2 Sept 10	Week 3 Sept 17	Week 4 Sept 24	Week 5 Oct 1	Week 6 Oct 8	Week 7 Oct 15	Week 8 Oct 22	Week 9 Oct 29	Week 10 Nov 5	Week 11 Nov 12	Week 12 Nov 19	Week 13 Nov 26	Week 14 Postseason	
		Dropped: 21 Northern Arizona	Dropped: 19 Montana State; 23 Hampton; 25 Harvard	Dropped: 14 Sam Houston State; 15 Delaware; 21 Western Kentucky; 24 Jacksonville State	Dropped: 22 Richmond; 23 Holy Cross; 25 Alabama State	Dropped: 23 James Madison; 24 Hofstra; 25 Western Kentucky	Dropped: 25 Harvard	Dropped: 18 Wofford; 21 Florida A&M; 23 Nicholls State; 24 Penn	Dropped: 16 Northern Arizona; 23 Stephen F. Austin; 25 Southern Illinois	Dropped: 17 Northern Iowa; 23 Youngstown State	Dropped: 21 South Carolina State; 25 Illinois State	Dropped: 24 Florida A&M	Dropped: 19 UMass; 21 Portland State	Dropped: 20 Lehigh; 21 Duquesne; 23 William & Mary	None	
