= 2003 Harvard Crimson football team =

American college football season

2003 Harvard Crimson football
- Conference: Ivy League
- Record: 7–3 (4–3 Ivy)
- Head coach: Tim Murphy (10th season)
- Offensive coordinator: Dave Cecchini (1st season)
- Offensive scheme: Spread
- Defensive coordinator: Kevin Doherty (2nd season)
- Base defense: 3–4
- Captain: Dante Balestracci
- Home stadium: Harvard Stadium

2003 Ivy League football standings
| | Conf. | | | Overall |
| Team | W | | L | W | | L |
|---|---|---|---|---|---|---|
| No. 12 Penn $ | 7 | – | 0 | 10 | – | 0 |
| Harvard | 4 | – | 3 | 7 | – | 3 |
| Brown | 4 | – | 3 | 5 | – | 5 |
| Yale | 4 | – | 3 | 6 | – | 4 |
| Dartmouth | 4 | – | 3 | 5 | – | 5 |
| Columbia | 3 | – | 4 | 4 | – | 6 |
| Princeton | 2 | – | 5 | 2 | – | 8 |
| Cornell | 0 | – | 7 | 1 | – | 9 |
$ – Conference champion; Rankings from The Sports Network poll

The 2003 Harvard Crimson football team was an American football team that represented Harvard University during the 2003 NCAA Division I-AA football season. Harvard tied for second in the Ivy League.

In their 10th year under head coach Tim Murphy, the Crimson compiled a 7–3 record and outscored opponents 317 to 221. Dante Balestracci was the team captain.

The Crimson's 4–3 conference record placed them in a four-way tie for second in the Ivy League standings. Harvard outscored Ivy opponents 212 to 151.

Harvard began the year unranked, but a six-game winning streak to start the season saw it enter the national top 25 in early October and climb as high as No. 16. November losses to two unranked opponents dropped the Crimson from the rankings, and they finished the year outside the top 25.

Harvard played its home games at Harvard Stadium in the Allston neighborhood of Boston, Massachusetts.

== Schedule ==
| Date | Opponent | Rank | Site | Result | Attendance | Source |
|---|---|---|---|---|---|---|
| September 20 | at Holy Cross* | | Fitton Field; Worcester, MA | W 43–23 | 10,312 | |
| September 27 | Brown | | Harvard Stadium; Boston, MA | W 52–14 | 9,460 | |
| October 4 | No. 10 Northeastern* | | Harvard Stadium; Boston, MA | W 28–20 | 10,017 | |
| October 11 | at Cornell | No. 23 | Schoellkopf Field; Ithaca, NY | W 27–0 | 6,123 | |
| October 18 | Lafayette* | No. 22 | Harvard Stadium; Boston, MA | W 34–27 | 8,326 | |
| October 25 | Princeton | No. 20 | Harvard Stadium; Boston, MA (rivalry) | W 43–40 ^{OT} | 14,086 | |
| November 1 | Dartmouth | No. 16 | Harvard Stadium; Boston, MA (rivalry) | L 16–30 | 12,186 | |
| November 8 | at Columbia | No. 23 | Wien Stadium; New York, NY | L 13–16 | 3,470 | |
| November 15 | No. 8 Penn | | Harvard Stadium; Boston, MA (rivalry) | L 24–32 | 12,585 | |
| November 22 | at Yale | | Yale Bowl; New Haven, CT (The Game) | W 37–19 | 53,136 | |
*Non-conference game; Rankings from The Sports Network Poll released prior to the game

== Roster ==
2003 Harvard Crimson football team roster
| Players | | | Coaches |
|---|---|---|---|
| Offense: Pos. / # / Name / Class; QB / 14 / Ryan Fitzpatrick / Jr | Defense: Pos. / # / Name / Class | Special teams: Pos. / # / Name / Class | Head coach: Tim Murphy; Coordinators/assistant coaches Legend: (C) Team captain; (S) Suspended; (I) Ineligible; Injured; Redshirt; Roster |
