= 2002 Harvard Crimson football team =

American college football season

2002 Harvard Crimson football
- Conference: Ivy League
- Record: 7–3 (6–1 Ivy)
- Head coach: Tim Murphy (9th season)
- Offensive coordinator: Jay Mills (7th season)
- Offensive scheme: Multiple pro-style
- Defensive coordinator: Kevin Doherty (1st season)
- Base defense: 3–4
- Captain: Neil Rose
- Home stadium: Harvard Stadium

2002 Ivy League football standings
	Conf.			Overall
Team	W		L	W		L
No. 17 Penn $	7	–	0	9	–	1
Harvard	6	–	1	7	–	3
Princeton	4	–	3	6	–	4
Yale	4	–	3	6	–	4
Cornell	3	–	4	4	–	6
Dartmouth	2	–	5	3	–	7
Brown	2	–	5	2	–	8
Columbia	0	–	7	1	–	9
$ – Conference champion; Rankings from The Sports Network poll

The 2002 Harvard Crimson football team was an American football team that represented Harvard University during the 2002 NCAA Division I-AA football season. The Crimson finished second in the Ivy League.

In their ninth year under head coach Timothy Murphy, the Crimson compiled a 7–3 record and outscored opponents 267 to 230. Neil Rose was the team captain.

Harvard's 6–1 conference record placed second in the Ivy League standings. The Crimson outscored Ivy opponents 190 to 154.

The Crimson appeared briefly, twice, in the national Division I-AA rankings: they were ranked No. 23 in the preseason poll, but dropped out of the top 25 before playing a game; and after opening the year with two wins, they were ranked No. 25 in the first poll of October. After their record dropped to 2–1, they again fell out of the national rankings, and did not reappear in 2002.

On November 16, the annual Harvard–Penn game was the first Division I-AA matchup to host an episode of ESPN's "College GameDay", which had only visited Division I-A sites in its first nine years of remote broadcasts. The Ivy League had called ESPN to suggest highlighting the matchup of two teams with 5–0 conference records.

Harvard played its home games at Harvard Stadium in the Allston neighborhood of Boston, Massachusetts.

== Schedule ==
Date	Opponent	Site	Result	Attendance	Source
September 21	No. 23 Holy Cross*	Harvard Stadium; Boston, MA	W 28–23	10,107	
September 28	at Brown	Brown Stadium; Providence, RI	W 26–24	13,523	
October 5	at No. 14 Lehigh*	Goodman Stadium; Bethlehem, PA	L 35–36	9,458	
October 12	Cornell	Harvard Stadium; Boston, MA	W 52–23	6,533	
October 19	No. 15 Northeastern*	Harvard Stadium; Boston, MA	L 14–17	13,402	
October 26	at Princeton	Princeton Stadium; Princeton, NJ (rivalry)	W 24–17	15,015	
November 2	at Dartmouth	Memorial Field; Hanover, NH (rivalry)	W 31–26	8,102	
November 9	Columbia	Harvard Stadium; Boston, MA	W 28–7	8,241	
November 16	at No. 17 Penn	Franklin Field; Philadelphia, PA (rivalry / College GameDay)	L 9–44	18,630	
November 23	Yale	Harvard Stadium; Boston, MA (The Game)	W 20–13	30,323	
*Non-conference game; Rankings from The Sports Network Poll released prior to the game

== Roster ==
2002 Harvard Crimson football team roster
Players			Coaches
Offense: Pos. / # / Name / Class; QB / 14 / Ryan Fitzpatrick / So	Defense: Pos. / # / Name / Class	Special teams: Pos. / # / Name / Class	Head coach: Tim Murphy; Coordinators/assistant coaches Legend: (C) Team captain; (S) Suspended; (I) Ineligible; Injured; Redshirt; Roster
