= 2002 Penn Quakers football team =

American college football season

2002 Penn Quakers football

Ivy League champion
- Conference: Ivy League

Ranking
- Sports Network: No. 17
- Record: 9–1 (7–0 Ivy)
- Head coach: Al Bagnoli (11th season)
- Offensive coordinator: Andy Coen (3rd season)
- Defensive coordinator: Ray Priore (5th season)
- Home stadium: Franklin Field

2002 Ivy League football standings
	Conf.			Overall
Team	W		L	W		L
No. 17 Penn $	7	–	0	9	–	1
Harvard	6	–	1	7	–	3
Princeton	4	–	3	6	–	4
Yale	4	–	3	6	–	4
Cornell	3	–	4	4	–	6
Dartmouth	2	–	5	3	–	7
Brown	2	–	5	2	–	8
Columbia	0	–	7	1	–	9
$ – Conference champion; Rankings from The Sports Network poll

The 2002 Penn Quakers football team represented the University of Pennsylvania in the 2002 NCAA Division I-AA football season. It was the 128th season of play for the Quakers. They were led by 11th-year head coach Al Bagnoli and played their home games at Franklin Field. They were a member of the Ivy League. They finished the season 9–1 and 7–0 in Ivy League play.

On November 16, before their annual game against Harvard, Penn became the first Division I-AA team to host an episode of ESPN's "College GameDay". The weekly national pregame show had begun broadcasting live from the site of a selected marquee matchup in 1993, though some weeks were produced in the studio in Bristol, Connecticut. By November 2002, ESPN had aired 94 shows from "on the road", all at the sites of Division I-A matchups. Coverage plans were decided less than a week ahead of time, which allowed ESPN to respond quickly when the Ivy League called to suggest hosting GameDay at the site where its two contenders for the conference title, with identical 5–0 league records, would meet. The pregame broadcast outside Franklin Field attracted a crowd of 900, and the presence of ESPN cameras was credited for boosting game attendance by about 5,000.

== Schedule ==
Date	Opponent	Rank	Site	Result	Attendance	Source
September 21	at Lafayette*		Fisher Stadium; Easton, PA	W 52–21	7,947	
September 28	Lehigh*		Franklin Field; Philadelphia, PA	W 24–21	13,275	
October 5	Dartmouth	No. 23	Franklin Field; Philadelphia, PA	W 49–14	8,674	
October 10	at No. 6 Villanova*	No. 24	Villanova Stadium; Villanova, PA	L 3–17	8,129	
October 19	Columbia		Franklin Field; Philadelphia, PA	W 44–0	11,208	
October 26	at Yale		Yale Bowl; New Haven, CT	W 41–20	2,500	
November 2	Brown	No. 24	Franklin Field; Philadelphia, PA	W 31–7	14,287	
November 9	at Princeton	No. 21	Princeton Stadium; Princeton, NJ (rivalry)	W 44–13	19,758	
November 16	Harvard	No. 17	Franklin Field; Philadelphia, PA (rivalry, College GameDay)	W 44–9	18,630	
November 23	at Cornell	No. 16	Schoellkopf Field; Ithaca, NY (rivalry)	W 31–0	4,090	
*Non-conference game; Rankings from The Sports Network Poll released prior to the game
