= 2003 Penn Quakers football team =

American college football season

2003 Penn Quakers football

Ivy League champion
- Conference: Ivy League

Ranking
- Sports Network: No. 12
- Record: 10–0 (7–0 Ivy)
- Head coach: Al Bagnoli (12th season)
- Offensive coordinator: Andy Coen (4th season)
- Defensive coordinator: Ray Priore (6th season)
- Home stadium: Franklin Field

2003 Ivy League football standings
	Conf.			Overall
Team	W		L	W		L
No. 12 Penn $	7	–	0	10	–	0
Harvard	4	–	3	7	–	3
Brown	4	–	3	5	–	5
Yale	4	–	3	6	–	4
Dartmouth	4	–	3	5	–	5
Columbia	3	–	4	4	–	6
Princeton	2	–	5	2	–	8
Cornell	0	–	7	1	–	9
$ – Conference champion; Rankings from The Sports Network poll

The 2003 Penn Quakers football team represented the University of Pennsylvania in the 2003 NCAA Division I-AA football season. The Quakers finished the season undefeated and won the Ivy League championship, their second league title in a row and third in four years.

== Schedule ==
Date	Opponent	Rank	Site	Result	Attendance	Source
September 20	Duquesne*	No. 23	Franklin Field; Philadelphia, PA	W 51–10	8,181	
September 27	at No. 19 Lehigh*	No. 21	Goodman Stadium; Bethlehem, PA	W 31–24	10,503	
October 4	at Dartmouth	No. 15	Memorial Field; Hanover, NH	W 33–20	5,104	
October 11	Bucknell*	No. 15	Franklin Field; Philadelphia, PA	W 14–13	6,410	
October 18	at Columbia	No. 15	Wien Stadium; New York, NY	W 31–7	13,785	
October 25	Yale	No. 13	Franklin Field; Philadelphia, PA	W 34–31 ^{OT}	16,510	
November 1	at Brown	No. 11	Brown Stadium; Providence, RI	W 24–21	8,172	
November 8	Princeton	No. 9	Franklin Field; Philadelphia, PA (rivalry)	W 37–7	21,060	
November 15	at Harvard	No. 8	Harvard Stadium; Boston, MA (rivalry)	W 32–24	12,585	
November 22	Cornell	No. 9	Franklin Field; Philadelphia, PA (rivalry)	W 59–7	8,203	
*Non-conference game; Rankings from The Sports Network Poll released prior to the game
