= 2003 Bucknell Bison football team =

American college football season

2003 Bucknell Bison football
- Conference: Patriot League
- Record: 6–6 (4–3 Patriot)
- Head coach: Tim Landis (1st season)
- Offensive coordinator: Ian Shields (1st season)
- Defensive coordinator: Tripp Merritt (1st season)
- Captains: Tim Johnson; Mike Leatherman
- Home stadium: Christy Mathewson–Memorial Stadium

2003 Patriot League football standings
	Conf.			Overall
Team	W		L	W		L
No. 2 Colgate $^	7	–	0	15	–	1
No. 23 Lehigh	6	–	1	8	–	3
Fordham	4	–	3	9	–	3
Bucknell	4	–	3	6	–	6
Towson	3	–	4	6	–	6
Lafayette	2	–	5	5	–	6
Georgetown	1	–	6	4	–	8
Holy Cross	1	–	6	1	–	11
$ – Conference champion; ^ – NCAA Division I-AA playoff participant; Rankings from The Sports Network poll

The 2003 Bucknell Bison football team was an American football team that represented Bucknell University during the 2003 NCAA Division I-AA football season. It tied for third in the Patriot League.

Bucknell played its home games at Christy Mathewson–Memorial Stadium on the university campus in Lewisburg, Pennsylvania.

In its first year under head coach Tim Landis, the Bison compiled a 6–6 record. Tim Johnson and Mike Leatherman were the team captains.

The Bison outscored opponents 299 to 284. Bucknell's 4–3 conference record tied for second out of eight in the Patriot League standings.

== Schedule ==
Date	Opponent	Site	Result	Attendance	Source
August 30	Duquesne*	Christy Mathewson–Memorial Stadium; Lewisburg, PA	W 28–21	5,762	
September 6	at Delaware State*	Alumni Stadium; Dover, DE	W 33–28	4,756	
September 20	at Cornell*	Schoellkopf Field; Ithaca, NY	L 19–21	10,568	
September 27	at Columbia*	Wien Stadium; New York, NY	L 16–19	3,019	
October 4	at No. 14 Fordham	Coffey Field; Bronx, NY	W 31–10	5,814	
October 11	at No. 15 Penn*	Franklin Field; Philadelphia, PA	L 13–14	6,410	
October 18	Towson^{†}	Christy Mathewson–Memorial Stadium; Lewisburg, PA	W 14–10	6,212	
October 25	at No. 16 Colgate	Andy Kerr Stadium; Hamilton, NY	L 6–50	8,655	
November 1	Holy Cross^	Christy Mathewson–Memorial Stadium; Lewisburg, PA	W 53–31	8,132	
November 8	at Lafayette	Fisher Field; Easton, PA	L 17–35	3,658	
November 15	Lehigh	Christy Mathewson–Memorial Stadium; Lewisburg, PA	L 9–45	4,032	
November 22	Georgetown^{†}	Christy Mathewson–Memorial Stadium; Lewisburg, PA	W 45–16	3,012	
*Non-conference game; ^{†}Homecoming; ^ Parents Weekend; Rankings from The Sports Network Poll released prior to the game
