= 2003 Princeton Tigers football team =

American college football season

2003 Princeton Tigers football
- Conference: Ivy League
- Record: 2–8 (2–5 Ivy)
- Head coach: Roger Hughes (4th season)
- Home stadium: Princeton Stadium

2003 Ivy League football standings
	Conf.			Overall
Team	W		L	W		L
No. 12 Penn $	7	–	0	10	–	0
Harvard	4	–	3	7	–	3
Brown	4	–	3	5	–	5
Yale	4	–	3	6	–	4
Dartmouth	4	–	3	5	–	5
Columbia	3	–	4	4	–	6
Princeton	2	–	5	2	–	8
Cornell	0	–	7	1	–	9
$ – Conference champion; Rankings from The Sports Network poll

The 2003 Princeton Tigers football team was an American football team that represented Princeton University during the 2003 NCAA Division I-AA football season. Princeton finished second-to-last in the Ivy League.

In their fourth year under head coach Roger Hughes, the Tigers compiled a 2–8 record and were outscored 267 to 204. Tim Kirby and Dave Splitthoff were the team captains.

Princeton's 2–5 conference placed seventh in the Ivy League standings. The Tigers were outscored 181 to 175 by Ivy opponents.

The Tigers played their home games at Princeton Stadium, on the university campus in Princeton, New Jersey.

== Schedule ==
Date	Opponent	Site	Result	Attendance	Source
September 20	No. 20 Lehigh*	Princeton Stadium; Princeton, NJ	L 13–28		
September 27	at Lafayette*	Fisher Field; Easton, PA	L 13–28	7,107	
October 4	Columbia	Princeton Stadium; Princeton, NJ	L 27–33	8,575	
October 11	No. 17 Colgate*	Princeton Stadium; Princeton, NJ	L 3–30	14,096	
October 18	at Brown	Brown Stadium; Providence, RI	W 34–14	9,879	
October 25	at No. 20 Harvard	Harvard Stadium; Boston, MA (rivalry)	L 40–43 ^{2OT}	14,086	
November 1	Cornell	Princeton Stadium; Princeton, NJ	W 28–6	14,037	
November 8	at No. 9 Penn	Franklin Field; Philadelphia, PA (rivalry)	L 7–37	21,060	
November 15	Yale	Princeton Stadium; Princeton, NJ (rivalry)	L 24–27 ^{OT}	16,369	
November 22	at Dartmouth	Memorial Field; Hanover, NH	L 15–21	3,822	
*Non-conference game; Rankings from The Sports Network Poll released prior to the game
