= 2003 Georgetown Hoyas football team =

American college football season

2003 Georgetown Hoyas football
- Conference: Patriot League
- Record: 4–8 (1–6 Patriot)
- Head coach: Bob Benson (11th season)
- Captains: Andrew Clarke; Matt Fronczke; William Huisking; Luke McArdle
- Home stadium: Harbin Field

2003 Patriot League football standings
	Conf.			Overall
Team	W		L	W		L
No. 2 Colgate $^	7	–	0	15	–	1
No. 23 Lehigh	6	–	1	8	–	3
Fordham	4	–	3	9	–	3
Bucknell	4	–	3	6	–	6
Towson	3	–	4	6	–	6
Lafayette	2	–	5	5	–	6
Georgetown	1	–	6	4	–	8
Holy Cross	1	–	6	1	–	11
$ – Conference champion; ^ – NCAA Division I-AA playoff participant; Rankings from The Sports Network poll

The 2003 Georgetown Hoyas football team was an American football team that represented Georgetown University during the 2003 NCAA Division I-AA football season. The Hoyas tied for last in the Patriot League.

In their 11th year under head coach Bob Benson, the Hoyas compiled a 4–8 record. Andrew Clarke, Matt Fronczke, William Huisking and Luke McArdle were the team captains.

The Hoyas were outscored 334 to 272. Georgetown's 1–6 conference record tied for last place in the Patriot League standings.

Georgetown played its home games at Harbin Field on the university campus in Washington, D.C.

== Schedule ==
Date	Opponent	Site	Result	Attendance	Source
September 6	Colgate	Harbin Field; Washington, DC	L 19–20	2,406	
September 13	at Holy Cross	Fitton Field; Worcester, MA	L 34–42	6,412	
September 20	Monmouth*	Harbin Field; Washington, DC	L 10–12	1,146	
September 27	at VMI*	Alumni Memorial Field; Lexington, VA	L 14–42	6,137	
October 4	at Lafayette	Fisher Field; Easton, PA	W 17–10	2,238	
October 11	Stony Brook^{†}*	Harbin Field; Washington, DC	W 49–21	2,267	
October 18	at Cornell*	Schoellkopf Field; Ithaca, NY	W 42–20	4,358	
October 25	Lehigh	Harbin Field; Washington, DC	L 24–45	2,123	
November 1	at No. 22 Fordham	Coffey Field; Bronx, NY	L 10–34	4,522	
November 8	Towson	Harbin Field; Washington, DC	L 6–27	996	
November 15	Davidson*	Harbin Field; Washington, DC	W 30–10	1,114	
November 22	at Bucknell	Christy Mathewson–Memorial Stadium; Lewisburg, PA	L 16–45	3,012	
*Non-conference game; ^{†}Homecoming; Rankings from The Sports Network Poll released prior to the game
