= 2002 Bucknell Bison football team =

American college football season

2002 Bucknell Bison football
- Conference: Patriot League
- Record: 2–9 (0–7 Patriot)
- Head coach: Dave Kotulski (1st season)
- Captains: Gary Carruthers; Adam Lord; Todd Warmington
- Home stadium: Christy Mathewson–Memorial Stadium

2002 Patriot League football standings
	Conf.			Overall
Team	W		L	W		L
No. 12 Fordham +^	6	–	1	10	–	3
No. 25 Colgate +	6	–	1	9	–	3
Lafayette	5	–	2	7	–	5
Lehigh	4	–	3	8	–	4
Towson	3	–	4	6	–	5
Georgetown	2	–	5	5	–	6
Holy Cross	2	–	5	4	–	8
Bucknell	0	–	7	2	–	9
+ – Conference co-champions; ^ – NCAA Division I-AA playoff participant; Rankings from The Sports Network poll

The 2002 Bucknell Bison football team was an American football team that represented Bucknell University during the 2002 NCAA Division I-AA football season. Bucknell finished last in the Patriot League.

Dave Kotulski, who had been Bucknell's defensive coordinator since 1995, took over as acting head coach in 2002 after Tom Gadd, who had been diagnosed with cancer in early 2001, stepped away from the team for health reasons.

In Kotulski's first and only year as head coach, the Bison compiled a 2–9 record. Gary Carruthers, Adam Lord and Todd Warmington were the team captains.

The Bison were outscored 251 to 163. Their winless (0–7) conference record placed last in the Patriot League standings. On the last weekend of October, the Bison became the first team to lose a Patriot League game to Georgetown, which had joined the league the previous year; at season's end, Bucknell became the first team to equal Georgetown by finishing in eighth place.

Toward the end of the year, with Gadd hospitalized, university officials announced that Gadd would not return in 2003, and the Bison would search for a replacement head coach. Gadd died in March 2003.

Bucknell played its home games at Christy Mathewson–Memorial Stadium on the university campus in Lewisburg, Pennsylvania.

== Schedule ==
Date	Opponent	Site	Result	Attendance	Source
September 7	at Duquesne*	Rooney Field; Pittsburgh, PA	L 14–35	4,805	
September 14	at Saint Mary's*	Saint Mary's Stadium; Moraga, CA	L 22–23 ^{OT}		
September 21	Cornell*	Christy Mathewson–Memorial Stadium; Lewisburg, PA	W 14–3	6,922	
September 28	Delaware State*	Christy Mathewson–Memorial Stadium; Lewisburg, PA	W 27–13	3,024	
October 5	Colgate^	Christy Mathewson–Memorial Stadium; Lewisburg, PA	L 10–13 ^{OT}	9,202	
October 19	at Towson	Towson University Stadium; Towson, MD	L 14–20	5,064	
October 26	at Georgetown	Harbin Field; Washington, DC	L 31–32	1,011	
November 2	at Holy Cross	Fitton Field; Worcester, MA	L 21–38	2,879	
November 9	Lafayette^{†}	Christy Mathewson–Memorial Stadium; Lewisburg, PA	L 3–19	6,202	
November 16	at No. 23 Lehigh	Goodman Stadium; Bethlehem, PA	L 0–24		
November 23	No. 21 Fordham	Christy Mathewson–Memorial Stadium; Lewisburg, PA	L 7–34	2,012	
*Non-conference game; ^{†}Homecoming; ^ Parents Weekend; Rankings from The Sports Network Poll released prior to the game
