= 2003 Cornell Big Red football team =

American college football season

2003 Cornell Big Red football
- Conference: Ivy League
- Record: 1–9 (0–7 Ivy)
- Head coach: Tim Pendergast (3rd season)
- Offensive coordinator: John Strollo (3rd season)
- Defensive coordinator: Jim Pletcher (3rd season)
- Captains: Mick Razzano; Kevin Rooney
- Home stadium: Schoellkopf Field

2003 Ivy League football standings
	Conf.			Overall
Team	W		L	W		L
No. 12 Penn $	7	–	0	10	–	0
Harvard	4	–	3	7	–	3
Brown	4	–	3	5	–	5
Yale	4	–	3	6	–	4
Dartmouth	4	–	3	5	–	5
Columbia	3	–	4	4	–	6
Princeton	2	–	5	2	–	8
Cornell	0	–	7	1	–	9
$ – Conference champion; Rankings from The Sports Network poll

The 2003 Cornell Big Red football team represented Cornell University in the 2003 NCAA Division I-AA football season. They were led by third-year head coach Tim Pendergast and played their home games at Schoellkopf Field in Hamilton, New York, compiling a 1–9 overall record. Cornell finished last in the Ivy League, with a 0–7 mark against conference opponents.

== Schedule ==
Date	Time	Opponent	Site	Result	Attendance	Source
September 20	1:00 p.m.	Bucknell*	Schoellkopf Field; Ithaca, NY	W 21–19	10,568	
September 27	1:00 p.m.	at Yale	Yale Bowl; New Haven, CT	L 7–21	18,617	
October 4	1:00 p.m.	Colgate*	Schoellkopf Field; Ithaca, NY (rivalry)	L 24–27	4,142	
October 11	1:00 p.m.	Harvard	Schoellkopf Field; Ithaca, NY	L 0–27	6,123	
October 18	1:00 p.m.	Georgetown*	Schoellkopf Field; Ithaca, NY	L 20–42	4,358	
October 25	1:00 p.m.	Brown	Schoellkopf Field; Ithaca, NY	L 7–21	6,864	
November 1	1:00 p.m.	at Princeton	Princeton Stadium; Princeton, NJ	L 6–28	14,037	
November 8	12:30 p.m.	at Dartmouth	Memorial Field; Hanover, NH (rivalry)	L 17–26	4,308	
November 15	1:00 p.m.	Columbia	Schoellkopf Field; Ithaca, NY (rivalry)	L 21–34	4,242	
November 22	4:00 p.m.	at Penn	Franklin Field; Philadelphia, PA (rivalry)	L 7–59	8,203	
*Non-conference game; All times are in Eastern time
