= 2002 Columbia Lions football team =

American college football season

2002 Columbia Lions football
- Conference: Ivy League
- Record: 1–9 (0–7 Ivy)
- Head coach: Ray Tellier (14th season)
- Captains: Chris Carey; Pat Girardi
- Home stadium: Wien Stadium

2002 Ivy League football standings
	Conf.			Overall
Team	W		L	W		L
No. 17 Penn $	7	–	0	9	–	1
Harvard	6	–	1	7	–	3
Princeton	4	–	3	6	–	4
Yale	4	–	3	6	–	4
Cornell	3	–	4	4	–	6
Dartmouth	2	–	5	3	–	7
Brown	2	–	5	2	–	8
Columbia	0	–	7	1	–	9
$ – Conference champion; Rankings from The Sports Network poll

The 2002 Columbia Lions football team was an American football team that represented Columbia University during the 2002 NCAA Division I-AA football season. Columbia finished last in the Ivy League.

In their 14th and final season under head coach Ray Tellier, the Lions compiled a 1–9 record and were outscored 295 to 161. Chris Carey and Pat Girardi were the team captains.

The Lions' winless (0–7) conference record was the worst in the Ivy League standings. Columbia was outscored 223 to 115 by Ivy opponents.

Columbia played its homes games at Lawrence A. Wien Stadium in Upper Manhattan, in New York City.

== Schedule ==
Date	Opponent	Site	Result	Attendance	Source
September 21	Fordham*	Wien Stadium; New York, NY (Liberty Cup)	W 13–11	3,865	
September 28	at Colgate*	Andy Kerr Stadium; Hamilton, NY	L 6–38	5,891	
October 5	Princeton	Wien Stadium; New York, NY	L 32–35	9,103	
October 12	Lafayette*	Wien Stadium; New York, NY	L 21–28	1,306	
October 19	at Penn	Franklin Field; Philadelphia, PA	L 10–44	11,208	
October 26	Dartmouth^{†}	Wien Stadium; New York, NY	L 23–24	3,510	
November 2	at Yale	Yale Bowl; New Haven, CT	L 7–35	7,262	
November 9	at Harvard	Harvard Stadium; Boston, MA	L 7–28	8,241	
November 16	Cornell	Wien Stadium; New York, NY (rivalry)	L 14–17	2,715	
November 23	at Brown	Brown Stadium; Providence, RI	L 28–35	4,126	
*Non-conference game; ^{†}Homecoming
