= 2003 Brown Bears football team =

American college football season

2003 Brown Bears football
- Conference: Ivy League
- Record: 5–5 (4–3 Ivy)
- Head coach: Phil Estes (6th season)
- Offensive scheme: Pro-style
- Defensive coordinator: Michael Kelleher (3rd season)
- Base defense: 4–3
- Captains: C. Garnett; B. J. Grinna; K. R. Slager
- Home stadium: Brown Stadium

2003 Ivy League football standings
	Conf.			Overall
Team	W		L	W		L
No. 12 Penn $	7	–	0	10	–	0
Harvard	4	–	3	7	–	3
Brown	4	–	3	5	–	5
Yale	4	–	3	6	–	4
Dartmouth	4	–	3	5	–	5
Columbia	3	–	4	4	–	6
Princeton	2	–	5	2	–	8
Cornell	0	–	7	1	–	9
$ – Conference champion; Rankings from The Sports Network poll

The 2003 Brown Bears football team was an American football team that represented Brown University during the 2003 NCAA Division I-AA football season. Brown tied for second in the Ivy League.

In their sixth season under head coach Phil Estes, the Bears compiled a 5–5 record and were outscored 246 to 244. C. Garnett, B. J. Grinna and K. R. Slager were the team captains.

The Bears' 4–3 conference record placed them in a four-way tie for second in the Ivy League standings. They outscored Ivy opponents 193 to 192.

Brown played its home games at Brown Stadium in Providence, Rhode Island.

== Schedule ==
Date	Opponent	Site	Result	Attendance	Source
September 20	at Albany*	University Field; Albany, NY	W 21–3	3,680	
September 27	at Harvard	Harvard Stadium; Boston, MA	L 14–52	9,460	
October 4	Rhode Island*	Brown Stadium; Providence, RI (rivalry)	L 9–27	5,728	
October 11	No. 25 Fordham*	Brown Stadium; Providence, RI	L 21–24	4,516	
October 18	Princeton	Brown Stadium; Providence, RI	L 14–34	9,879	
October 25	at Cornell	Schoellkopf Field; Ithaca, NY	W 21–7	6,864	
November 1	No. 11 Penn	Brown Stadium; Providence, RI	L 21–24	8,172	
November 8	at Yale	Yale Bowl; New Haven, CT	W 55–44	15,442	
November 15	Dartmouth	Brown Stadium; Providence, RI	W 26–21	6,270	
November 22	at Columbia	Wien Stadium; New York, NY	W 42–10	4,841	
*Non-conference game; Rankings from The Sports Network Poll released prior to the game

== Personnel ==
2003 Brown Bears football team roster
Players
Coaches
Offense

Pos.	#	Name	Class
WR	1	Jarrett Schreck	So
QB	2	Kyle Slater	Sr
WR	4	Jordan Pryor	So
WR	7	Efren Blackledge	So
WR	8	John Covert	So
QB	10	Nathan Poole	Sr
QB	15	Matthew Hostetler	So
QB	16	Nick Marietti	Jr
WR	18	John Milko	So
RB	21	Tristan Murray	So
FB	26	Simon Brown	So
WR	27	Mike Westbrook	Jr
RB	31	Carson Brennan	So
FB	35	Brent Grinna	Sr
FB	35	Brent Grinna	Sr
RB	36	Max Tornatore	So
RB	42	Nick Hartigan	So
OL	54	John Kazanovicz	So
OL	64	Will Burroughs	Jr
OL	65	Alex Jury	So
OL	67	Ian Tolle	Jr
OL	71	Lawrence Rubida	Sr
OL	72	Jeff Thompson	So
OL	73	Tyler Johnson	Jr
OL	74	Sean Fortin	Jr
OL	75	Conor Clarke	So
OL	76	Eugene Hamlin	So
OL	77	Mike Cooper	So
WR	81	Shawn Smith	Jr
TE	82	Nicholas Christ	Sr
WR	84	Lonnie Hill	So
TE	87	Stephen Silhan	Sr
TE	89	David Turner	So
TE	92	Jesse Eahartic	So
WR		Thomas Balestracci	Fr
OL		Evan Barbosa	Fr
OL		Adam Cross	Fr
OL		Michael DiBartolo	Fr
QB		Joseph DiGiacomo	Fr
OL		Alex Doty	Fr
WR		Keith Heyward	Fr
TE		Matthew Krevis	Fr
OL		Jeffrey Malone	Fr
RB		Brandon Markey	Fr
RB		Akinbowale Oyalowo	Fr
FB		Tyler Rowley	Fr
WR		Shane Sabine	Fr
OL		Blake Trocki	Fr
QB		Anthony Vita	Fr

Defense

Pos.	#	Name	Class
DB	3	Anjel Gutieraez	Jr
S	4	Craig Young	Jr
DB	5	Rashad Collins	So
DB	14	Jason Ching	So
DB	19	Tim Cottor	So
DB	20	James Gasparella	So
OLB	22	Jermaine Griffin	Sr
S	25	Nick Mellors	Sr
DB	30	Darren Carmon	Sr
OLB	34	Jon Loiacono	Jr
OLB	37	Richard Dunk	So
LB	40	Daniel Doublin	Jr
OLB	41	Kyle Tracey	So
LB	44	James Frazier	So
LB	49	Andrew Gallagher	Sr
LB	51	Scott Epperson	Jr
LB	52	Steven Storrs	So
DL	60	Gregory Burlin	So
DL	63	William Brucker	Sr
DE	85	Kurt Bazarewski	Jr
DL	90	Matt Heinz	Sr
DE	91	Tynan Wyatt	Jr
DL	94	Christian Garnett	Sr
DL	95	Paul Kaminski	Jr
DL	96	Patrick Curran	So
DE	97	Jessie Hawkins	Sr
DB		Justin Amoah	Fr
DB		Mike Cholipski	Fr
DL		Brian Czekanski	Fr
LB		Zak DeOssie	Fr
DE		Casey Dougan	Fr
LB		Ted Edwards	Fr
LB		Justin Gallagher	Fr
LB		David Healy	Fr
DB		Gregory Hill	Fr
LB		Joshua Hill	Fr
DB		Gavin Logan	Fr
DL		Adam Muzika	Fr
DL		Harrison Noffs	Fr
DL		Patrick Norman	Fr
DB		Adjatay Nyadjroh	Fr
LB		Chris Skeffington	Fr

Special teams

Pos.	#	Name	Class
PK	9	Paul Christian	So
P	43	Timothy Goobic	Sr

Head coach

- Phil Estes

Coordinators/assistant coaches

- Abbott Burrell
  (Assistant head coach/secondary coach)
- Michael Kelleher
  (Defensive coordinator)
- Kevin Bouagoin
  (Wide receivers coach)
- Neil McGrath
  (Defensive line coach)
- Frank Sheehan
  (Offensive line coach)
- Paul Boudreau Jr.
  (Tight ends coach)
- Rapheal Dowdye
  (Running backs coach)
- Paul Frisone
  (Outside linebackers coach)
- Dan DiCenzo
  (Assistant outside linebackers coach)

Legend

- (C) Team captain
- (S) Suspended
- (I) Ineligible
- Injured
- Redshirt

Roster
Last update: April 11, 2024
