= 2002 Cornell Big Red football team =

American college football season

2002 Cornell Big Red football
- Conference: Ivy League
- Record: 4–6 (3–4 Ivy)
- Head coach: Tim Pendergast (2nd season)
- Offensive coordinator: John Strollo (2nd season)
- Defensive coordinator: Jim Pletcher (2nd season)
- Captains: Nate Archer; Nate Spitler
- Home stadium: Schoellkopf Field

2002 Ivy League football standings
| | Conf. | | | Overall |
| Team | W | | L | W | | L |
|---|---|---|---|---|---|---|
| No. 17 Penn $ | 7 | – | 0 | 9 | – | 1 |
| Harvard | 6 | – | 1 | 7 | – | 3 |
| Princeton | 4 | – | 3 | 6 | – | 4 |
| Yale | 4 | – | 3 | 6 | – | 4 |
| Cornell | 3 | – | 4 | 4 | – | 6 |
| Dartmouth | 2 | – | 5 | 3 | – | 7 |
| Brown | 2 | – | 5 | 2 | – | 8 |
| Columbia | 0 | – | 7 | 1 | – | 9 |
$ – Conference champion; Rankings from The Sports Network poll

The 2002 Cornell Big Red football team represented Cornell University in the 2002 NCAA Division I-AA football season. They were led by third-year head coach Tim Pendergast and played their home games at Schoellkopf Field in Ithaca, New York. They finished the season 4–6 overall and 3–4 in Ivy League play, finishing fifth.

== Schedule ==
| Date | Time | Opponent | Site | Result | Attendance | Source |
|---|---|---|---|---|---|---|
| September 21 | 7:00 p.m. | at Bucknell* | Christy Mathewson–Memorial Stadium; Lewisburg, PA | L 3–14 | 6,922 | |
| September 28 | 1:00 p.m. | Yale | Schoellkopf Field; Ithaca, NY | L 23–50 | 13,224 | |
| October 5 | 1:00 p.m. | Towson* | Schoellkopf Field; Ithaca, NY | W 34–31 | 4,242 | |
| October 12 | 1:00 p.m. | at Harvard | Harvard Stadium; Boston, MA | L 23–52 | 6,533 | |
| October 19 | 6:00 p.m. | Colgate* | Schoellkopf Field; Ithaca, NY (rivalry) | L 13–42 | 5,642 | |
| October 26 | 1:00 p.m. | at Brown | Brown Stadium; Providence, RI | W 10–7 | 7,014 | |
| November 2 | 1:00 p.m. | Princeton | Schoellkopf Field; Ithaca, NY | L 25–32 | | |
| November 9 | 1:00 p.m. | Dartmouth | Schoellkopf Field; Ithaca, NY (rivalry) | W 21–19 | | |
| November 16 | 12:30 p.m. | at Columbia | Wien Stadium; New York, NY (rivalry) | W 17–14 | 2,715 | |
| November 23 | 1:00 p.m. | Penn | Schoellkopf Field; Ithaca, NY (rivalry) | L 0–31 | 4,090 | |
*Non-conference game; All times are in Eastern time
