= 2002 Princeton Tigers football team =

American college football season

2002 Princeton Tigers football
- Conference: Ivy League
- Record: 6–4 (4–3 Ivy)
- Head coach: Roger Hughes (3rd season)
- Home stadium: Princeton Stadium

2002 Ivy League football standings
	Conf.			Overall
Team	W		L	W		L
No. 17 Penn $	7	–	0	9	–	1
Harvard	6	–	1	7	–	3
Princeton	4	–	3	6	–	4
Yale	4	–	3	6	–	4
Cornell	3	–	4	4	–	6
Dartmouth	2	–	5	3	–	7
Brown	2	–	5	2	–	8
Columbia	0	–	7	1	–	9
$ – Conference champion; Rankings from The Sports Network poll

The 2002 Princeton Tigers football team was an American football team that represented Princeton University in Princeton, New Jersey. During the 2002 NCAA Division I-AA football season. The Tigers tied for third in the Ivy League.

In their third year under head coach Roger Hughes, the Tigers compiled a 6–4 record, though they were outscored 236 to 226. Drew Babinecz and Chisom Opara were the team captains.

Princeton's 4–3 conference record tied for third in the Ivy League standings. The Tigers were outscored 176 to 154 by Ivy opponents.

The Tigers played their home games at Princeton Stadium on the university campus in Princeton, New Jersey.

== Schedule ==
Date	Opponent	Site	Result	Attendance	Source
September 21	at No. 3 Lehigh*	Goodman Stadium; Bethlehem, PA	L 24–31	12,176	
September 28	Lafayette*	Princeton Stadium; Princeton, NJ	W 34–19	17,883	
October 5	at Columbia	Wien Stadium; New York, NY	W 35–32	9,103	
October 12	Colgate*	Princeton Stadium; Princeton, NJ	W 14–10	11,485	
October 19	Brown	Princeton Stadium; Princeton, NJ	W 16–14	11,067	
October 26	Harvard	Princeton Stadium; Princeton, NJ (rivalry)	L 17–24	15,015	
November 2	at Cornell	Schoellkopf Field; Ithaca, NY	W 32–25 ^{OT}		
November 9	No. 21 Penn	Princeton Stadium; Princeton, NJ (rivalry)	L 13–44	19,758	
November 16	at Yale	Yale Bowl; New Haven, CT (rivalry)	L 3–7	7,638	
November 23	Dartmouth	Princeton Stadium; Princeton, NJ	W 38–30	11,597	
*Non-conference game; Rankings from The Sports Network Poll released prior to the game
