= 2003 Columbia Lions football team =

American college football season

2003 Columbia Lions football
- Conference: Ivy League
- Record: 4–6 (3–4 Ivy)
- Head coach: Bob Shoop (1st season)
- Captains: Rashad Biggers; Chris Carey; Jeff Roether
- Home stadium: Wien Stadium

2003 Ivy League football standings
	Conf.			Overall
Team	W		L	W		L
No. 12 Penn $	7	–	0	10	–	0
Harvard	4	–	3	7	–	3
Brown	4	–	3	5	–	5
Yale	4	–	3	6	–	4
Dartmouth	4	–	3	5	–	5
Columbia	3	–	4	4	–	6
Princeton	2	–	5	2	–	8
Cornell	0	–	7	1	–	9
$ – Conference champion; Rankings from The Sports Network poll

The 2003 Columbia Lions football team was an American football team that represented Columbia University during the 2003 NCAA Division I-AA football season. Columbia finished sixth in the Ivy League.

In their first season under head coach Bob Shoop, the Lions compiled a 4–6 record and were outscored 283 to 211. Rashad Biggers, Chris Carey and Jeff Roether were the team captains.

The Lions' 3–4 conference record placed sixth in the Ivy League standings. Columbia was outscored 189 to 135 by Ivy opponents.

Columbia played its homes games at Lawrence A. Wien Stadium in Upper Manhattan, in New York City.

== Schedule ==
Date	Opponent	Site	Result	Attendance	Source
September 20	at No. 18 Fordham*	Coffey Field; Bronx, NY (Liberty Cup)	L 30–37	6,895	
September 27	Bucknell*	Wien Stadium; New York, NY	W 19–16	3,019	
October 4	at Princeton	Princeton Stadium; Princeton, NJ	W 33–27	8,575	
October 11	at Lafayette*	Fisher Field; Easton, PA	L 27–41	8,358	
October 18	No. 15 Penn^{†}	Wien Stadium; New York, NY	L 7–31	13,785	
October 25	at Dartmouth	Memorial Field; Hanover, NH	L 21–26	8,125	
November 1	Yale	Wien Stadium; New York, NY	L 14–29	3,951	
November 8	No. 23 Harvard	Wien Stadium; New York, NY	W 16–13	3,470	
November 15	at Cornell	Schoellkopf Field; Ithaca, NY (rivalry)	W 34–21	4,242	
November 22	Brown	Wien Stadium; New York, NY	L 10–42	4,841	
*Non-conference game; ^{†}Homecoming; Rankings from The Sports Network Poll released prior to the game
