= Dave Kotulski =

American football coach and former player

Biographical details
- Born: c. 1951 or 1952 (age 73–74)

Playing career
- 1970–1973: New Mexico State
- Position: Linebacker

Coaching career (HC unless noted)
- 1978–1981: Utah (DL)
- 1982–1989: Utah (LB/DL)
- 1990–1994: Saint Mary's (DC/LB)
- 1995–2001: Bucknell (DC/LB)
- 2002: Bucknell
- 2003–2004: Utah State (DC/LB)
- 2005: Holy Cross (DC/LB)
- 2006–2011: Lehigh (DC/LB)
- 2012–2013: Stanford (ILB)
- 2014: Vanderbilt (DC/ILB)
- 2016: Utah State (ILB)
- 2017–2019: Mercyhurst (DC)

Head coaching record
- Overall: 2–9

David Kotulski is an American former college football coach and player. He was as the defensive coordinator at Mercyhurst University from 2016 to 2019. Kotulski served as the head football coach at Bucknell University for one season, in 2002, compiling a record of 2–9. He played college football at New Mexico State University.

== Head coaching record ==
Year	Team	Overall	Conference	Standing	Bowl/playoffs
Bucknell Bison (Patriot League) (2002)
2002	Bucknell	2–9	0–7	8th	
Bucknell:		2–9	0–7		
Total:		2–9			
