= 2002 Colgate Raiders football team =

American college football season

2002 Colgate Raiders football

Patriot League co-champion
- Conference: Patriot League

Ranking
- Sports Network: No. 25
- Record: 9–3 (6–1 Patriot)
- Head coach: Dick Biddle (7th season)
- Captains: Tom McCune; Max Wynn
- Home stadium: Andy Kerr Stadium

2002 Patriot League football standings
	Conf.			Overall
Team	W		L	W		L
No. 12 Fordham +^	6	–	1	10	–	3
No. 25 Colgate +	6	–	1	9	–	3
Lafayette	5	–	2	7	–	5
Lehigh	4	–	3	8	–	4
Towson	3	–	4	6	–	5
Georgetown	2	–	5	5	–	6
Holy Cross	2	–	5	4	–	8
Bucknell	0	–	7	2	–	9
+ – Conference co-champions; ^ – NCAA Division I-AA playoff participant; Rankings from The Sports Network poll

The 2002 Colgate Raiders football team was an American football team that represented Colgate University during the 2002 NCAA Division I-AA football season. Colgate tied for the Patriot League championship but did not qualify for the national playoffs.

In its seventh season under head coach Dick Biddle, the team compiled a 9–3 record. Tom McCune and Max Wynn were the team captains.

The Raiders outscored opponents 301 to 203. Their 6–1 conference record tied atop the eight-team Patriot League standings. Co-champion Fordham, which had dealt Colgate its only loss in conference play, was selected to receive the Patriot League's automatic berth in the NCAA Division I-AA playoffs. Unlike 1999, the last time the Patriot League had a tie for first place, in 2002 Colgate did not receive an at-large invitation to the playoffs.

From preseason to the last week of play, Colgate did not appear in the national Division I-AA top 25 rankings. After winning the co-championship, Colgate entered the rankings at No. 25 in the final poll of the year.

The team played its home games at Andy Kerr Stadium in Hamilton, New York.

== Schedule ==
Date	Opponent	Site	Result	Attendance	Source
September 7	No. 15 Villanova*	Andy Kerr Stadium; Hamilton, NY	L 0–20	6,532	
September 14	at Fordham	Coffey Field; Bronx, NY	L 31–40	7,142	
September 21	Dartmouth*	Andy Kerr Stadium; Hamilton, NY	W 30–26	7,368	
September 28	Columbia*	Andy Kerr Stadium; Hamilton, NY	W 38–6	5,891	
October 5	at Bucknell	Christy Mathewson–Memorial Stadium; Lewisburg, PA	W 13–10 ^{OT}	9,202	
October 12	at Princeton*	Princeton Stadium; Princeton, NJ	L 10–14	11,485	
October 19	at Cornell*	Schoellkopf Field; Ithaca, NY (rivalry)	W 42–13	5,642	
October 26	at Towson	Towson University Stadium; Towson, MD	W 9–7	2,133	
November 2	Lafayette	Andy Kerr Stadium; Hamilton, NY	W 31–24		
November 9	at No. 16 Lehigh	Goodman Stadium; Bethlehem, PA	W 28–14	15,023	
November 16	Georgetown	Andy Kerr Stadium; Hamilton, NY	W 44–22	3,144	
November 23	Holy Cross	Andy Kerr Stadium; Hamilton, NY	W 25–20	1,562	
*Non-conference game; Rankings from The Sports Network Poll released prior to the game
