= 2002 Brown Bears football team =

American college football season

2002 Brown Bears football
- Conference: Ivy League
- Record: 2–8 (2–5 Ivy)
- Head coach: Phil Estes (5th season)
- Offensive scheme: Pro-style
- Defensive coordinator: Michael Kelleher (2nd season)
- Base defense: 4–3
- Captains: Chas Gessner; A. W. Gallagher
- Home stadium: Brown Stadium

2002 Ivy League football standings
	Conf.			Overall
Team	W		L	W		L
No. 17 Penn $	7	–	0	9	–	1
Harvard	6	–	1	7	–	3
Princeton	4	–	3	6	–	4
Yale	4	–	3	6	–	4
Cornell	3	–	4	4	–	6
Dartmouth	2	–	5	3	–	7
Brown	2	–	5	2	–	8
Columbia	0	–	7	1	–	9
$ – Conference champion; Rankings from The Sports Network poll

The 2002 Brown Bears football team was an American football team that represented Brown University during the 2002 NCAA Division I-AA football season. Brown tied for second-to-last in the Ivy League.

In their fifth season under head coach Phil Estes, the Bears compiled a 2–8 record and were outscored 278 to 222. Chas Gessner and A. W. Gallagher were the team captains.

The Bears' 2–5 conference record tied for sixth place in the Ivy League standings. Brown was outscored 160 to 135 by Ivy opponents.

Brown played its home games at Brown Stadium in Providence, Rhode Island.

== Schedule ==
Date	Opponent	Site	Result	Attendance	Source
September 21	at Towson*	Towson University Stadium; Towson, MD	L 42–56	3,198	
September 28	Harvard	Brown Stadium; Providence, RI	L 24–26	13,523	
October 5	at Rhode Island*	Meade Stadium; Kingston, RI (rivalry)	L 28–38	3,990	
October 12	at Fordham*	Coffey Field; Bronx, NY	L 17–24	1,294	
October 19	at Princeton	Princeton Stadium; Princeton, NJ	L 14–16	11,067	
October 26	Cornell	Brown Stadium; Providence, RI	L 7–10 ^{OT}	7,014	
November 2	at No. 24 Penn	Franklin Field; Philadelphia, PA	L 7–31	14,287	
November 9	Yale	Brown Stadium; Providence, RI	L 27–31	5,510	
November 16	at Dartmouth	Memorial Field; Hanover, NH	W 21–18	1,916	
November 23	Columbia	Brown Stadium; Providence, RI	W 35–28	4,126	
*Non-conference game; Rankings from The Sports Network Poll released prior to the game
