= 2002 Yale Bulldogs football team =

American college football season

2002 Yale Bulldogs football
- Conference: Ivy League
- Record: 6–4 (4–3 Ivy)
- Head coach: Jack Siedlecki (6th season)
- Home stadium: Yale Bowl

2002 Ivy League football standings
	Conf.			Overall
Team	W		L	W		L
No. 17 Penn $	7	–	0	9	–	1
Harvard	6	–	1	7	–	3
Princeton	4	–	3	6	–	4
Yale	4	–	3	6	–	4
Cornell	3	–	4	4	–	6
Dartmouth	2	–	5	3	–	7
Brown	2	–	5	2	–	8
Columbia	0	–	7	1	–	9
$ – Conference champion; Rankings from The Sports Network poll

The 2002 Yale Bulldogs football team represented Yale University in the 2002 NCAA Division I-AA football season. The Bulldogs were led by sixth-year head coach Jack Siedlecki, played their home games at the Yale Bowl and finished tied for third in the Ivy League with a 4–3 record, 6–4 overall.

== Schedule ==
Date	Opponent	Site	Result	Attendance	Source
September 21	San Diego*	Yale Bowl; New Haven, CT	W 49–14	15,199	
September 28	at Cornell	Schoellkopf Field; Ithaca, NY	W 50–23	13,224	
October 5	Holy Cross*	Yale Bowl; New Haven, CT	W 28–19	15,026	
October 12	at Dartmouth	Memorial Field; Hanover, NH	L 17–20	7,112	
October 19	at Lehigh*	Goodman Stadium; Bethlehem, PA	L 7–14	8,670	
October 26	Penn	Yale Bowl; New Haven, CT	L 20–41	2,500	
November 2	Columbia	Yale Bowl; New Haven, CT	W 35–7	7,262	
November 9	at Brown	Brown Stadium; Providence, RI	W 31–27	5,510	
November 16	Princeton	Yale Bowl; New Haven, CT (rivalry)	W 7–3	7,638	
November 23	at Harvard	Harvard Stadium; Boston, MA (The Game)	L 13–20	30,323	
*Non-conference game
