= 2003 Towson Tigers football team =

American college football season

2003 Towson Tigers football
- Conference: Patriot League
- Record: 6–6 (3–4 Patriot)
- Head coach: Gordy Combs (12th season)
- Home stadium: Johnny Unitas Stadium

2003 Patriot League football standings
	Conf.			Overall
Team	W		L	W		L
No. 2 Colgate $^	7	–	0	15	–	1
No. 23 Lehigh	6	–	1	8	–	3
Fordham	4	–	3	9	–	3
Bucknell	4	–	3	6	–	6
Towson	3	–	4	6	–	6
Lafayette	2	–	5	5	–	6
Georgetown	1	–	6	4	–	8
Holy Cross	1	–	6	1	–	11
$ – Conference champion; ^ – NCAA Division I-AA playoff participant; Rankings from The Sports Network poll

The 2003 Towson Tigers football team was an American football team that represented Towson University during the 2003 NCAA Division I-AA football season. In its final year of Patriot League competition, Towson finished fifth.

In their 12th year under head coach Gordy Combs, the Tigers compiled a 6–6 record.

The Tigers were outscored 274 to 271. Their 3–4 conference record placed fifth out of eight in the Patriot League standings.

This year marked Towson's seventh and final Patriot League campaign, as the Tigers had agreed in 2002 to join the Atlantic 10 Conference for football, starting with the 2004 season. Though they remained in Division I-AA, this move gave Towson a higher level of competition, more similarly sized schools, and the opportunity to award athletic scholarships. By joining the A-10, Towson would also gain football matchups with Delaware, Hofstra, James Madison and William & Mary, all A-10 football members that competed with Towson in other sports in their primary conference, the Colonial Athletic Association.

Towson played its home games at Johnny Unitas Stadium on the university campus in Towson, Maryland. The stadium had been built the previous year and started 2003 with the name Towson University Stadium; it was rededicated to honor the late Johnny Unitas on October 11, 2003. In addition to being a local celebrity from his tenure as quarterback of the Baltimore Colts, Unitas had also been the father of three Towson students and had led efforts to find a naming partner for the new Towson football stadium.

== Schedule ==
Date	Opponent	Site	Result	Attendance	Source
August 30	at Morgan State*	Hughes Stadium; Baltimore, MD (rivalry)	L 16–19	4,574	
September 6	Lock Haven*	Towson University Stadium; Towson, MD	W 50–19	3,306	
September 13	Lafayette	Towson University Stadium; Towson, MD	W 19–13	1,600	
September 20	at Yale*	Yale Bowl; New Haven, CT	L 28–62	9,715	
September 27	at No. 22 Colgate	Andy Kerr Stadium; Hamilton, NY	L 7–26	7,467	
October 11	Holy Cross^{†}^	Johnny Unitas Stadium; Towson, MD	W 30–13	8,125	
October 18	at Bucknell	Christy Mathewson–Memorial Stadium; Lewisburg, PA	L 10–14	6,212	
October 25	Elon	Johnny Unitas Stadium; Towson, MD	W 24–7	3,586	
November 1	at Lehigh	Goodman Stadium; Bethlehem, PA	L 3–35	13,853	
November 8	at Georgetown	Multi-Sport Field; Washington, DC	W 27–6	996	
November 15	Albany*	Johnny Unitas Stadium; Towson, MD	W 35–16	2,118	
November 22	No. 25 Fordham	Johnny Unitas Stadium; Towson, MD	L 22–35	2,258	
*Non-conference game; ^{†}Homecoming; ^ Dedication of Johnny Unitas Stadium; Rankings from The Sports Network Poll released prior to the game
