= Tim Pendergast =

American football coach (born 1958)

Biographical details
- Born: August 15, 1958 (age 68)

Coaching career (HC unless noted)
- 1980: Ithaca (GA)
- 1981–1982: Cornell (freshmen)
- 1983–1989: Cornell (DB)
- 1990–1991: Northwestern (assistant)
- 1992: Maine (DB)
- 1993–1994: James Madison (DB)
- 1995–1996: James Madison (DC/DB)
- 1997–1999: Memphis (DB)
- 2000: Hamilton
- 2001–2003: Cornell
- 2006: Ithaca (DB)

Head coaching record
- Overall: 9–28

Tim Pendergast (born August 15, 1958) is an American former college football coach. He served as the head football coach at Hamilton College in 2000 and at Cornell University from 2001 to 2003, compiling a career head coaching record of 9–28.

Pendergast graduated from State University of New York at Cortland and earned a master's degree from Ithaca College, where he began his coaching career as an assistant in 1980. He was then an assistant coach at Cornell from 1981 to 1989. He first served as the freshman coach from 1981 to 1982 before being named the defensive backs coach in 1983. After a stint as an assistant for Northwestern he was hired as the defensive backs coach for Maine. In 1993, he accepted the same position for James Madison. He was promoted to defensive coordinator in 1995. In 1997, he reverted to his role of defensive backs coach when he was hired by Memphis.

Pendergast was fired from his position at Cornell in November 2003. He 2003 Cornell team lost its final nine games to finish the season with a record of 1–9 and last place in the Ivy League. The nine-game losing streak was the second-longest in the history of the Cornell Big Red football program, topped only a ten-game losing streak in 1975 and 1976 under head coach George Seifert. In his three seasons as head coach Cornell, Pendergast's teams had an overall record of 7–22 with a mark of 5–16 in Ivy League play.

== Head coaching record ==
Year	Team	Overall	Conference	Standing	Bowl/playoffs
Hamilton Continentals (New England Small College Athletic Conference) (2000)
2000	Hamilton	2–6	2–6	T–7th	
Hamilton:		2–6	2–6		
Cornell Big Red (Ivy League) (2001–2003)
2001	Cornell	2–7	2–5	6th	
2002	Cornell	4–6	3–4	5th	
2003	Cornell	1–9	0–7	8th	
Cornell:		7–22	5–16		
Total:		9–28			
