= 2003 Fordham Rams football team =

American college football season

2003 Fordham Rams football
- Conference: Patriot League
- Record: 9–3 (4–3 Patriot)
- Head coach: Dave Clawson (5th season)
- Offensive coordinator: Ed Foley (5th season)
- Captains: Kevin Eakin; Colby Khuns; Dan McGrath; Kirwin Watson
- Home stadium: Coffey Field

2003 Patriot League football standings
	Conf.			Overall
Team	W		L	W		L
No. 2 Colgate $^	7	–	0	15	–	1
No. 23 Lehigh	6	–	1	8	–	3
Fordham	4	–	3	9	–	3
Bucknell	4	–	3	6	–	6
Towson	3	–	4	6	–	6
Lafayette	2	–	5	5	–	6
Georgetown	1	–	6	4	–	8
Holy Cross	1	–	6	1	–	11
$ – Conference champion; ^ – NCAA Division I-AA playoff participant; Rankings from The Sports Network poll

The 2003 Fordham Rams football team was an American football team that represented Fordham University during the 2003 NCAA Division I-AA football season. A year after winning the conference championship, Fordham tied for third in the Patriot League.

In their fifth and final year under head coach Dave Clawson, the Rams compiled a 9–3 record. Kevin Eakin, Colby Khuns, Dan McGrath and Kirwin Watson were the team captains.

The Rams outscored opponents 386 to 251. Their 4–3 conference record tied for third out of eight in the Patriot League standings.

The Rams were ranked No. 13 in the preseason Division I-AA national poll, and moved up and down in the rankings during the year, reaching as high as No. 9 and dropping to No. 25 on two occasions, including the final week of the season. After that last game, Fordham dropped farther and finished the year unranked.

Fordham played its home games at Jack Coffey Field on the university's Rose Hill campus in The Bronx, in New York City.

== Schedule ==
Date	Opponent	Rank	Site	Result	Attendance	Source
August 30	C.W. Post*	No. 13	Coffey Field; Bronx, NY	W 42–7	4,160	
September 6	at Rhode Island*	No. 13	Meade Stadium; Kingston, RI	W 63–28	4,311	
September 13	at Lehigh	No. 9	Goodman Stadium; Bethlehem, PA	L 16–23	7,401	
September 20	Columbia^{†}*	No. 18	Coffey Field; Bronx, NY (Liberty Cup)	W 37–30	6,895	
October 4	Bucknell	No. 14	Coffey Field; Bronx, NY	L 10–31	5,814	
October 11	at Brown*	No. 25	Brown Stadium; Providence, RI	W 24–21	4,516	
October 18	New Haven*	No. 24	Coffey Field; Bronx, NY	W 41–7	2,922	
October 25	at Lafayette	No. 24	Fisher Field; Easton, PA	W 32–30		
November 1	Georgetown	No. 22	Coffey Field; Bronx, NY	W 34–10	4,522	
November 8	Holy Cross	No. 19	Coffey Field; Bronx, NY (rivalry)	W 49–28	5,277	
November 15	at No. 7 Colgate	No. 19	Andy Kerr Stadium; Hamilton, NY	L 3–14	4,673	
November 22	at Towson	No. 25	Johnny Unitas Stadium; Towson, MD	W 35–22	2,258	
*Non-conference game; ^{†}Homecoming; Rankings from The Sports Network Poll released prior to the game
