= 2002 Towson Tigers football team =

American college football season

2002 Towson Tigers football
- Conference: Patriot League
- Record: 6–5 (3–4 Patriot)
- Head coach: Gordy Combs (11th season)
- Home stadium: Towson University Stadium

2002 Patriot League football standings
	Conf.			Overall
Team	W		L	W		L
No. 12 Fordham +^	6	–	1	10	–	3
No. 25 Colgate +	6	–	1	9	–	3
Lafayette	5	–	2	7	–	5
Lehigh	4	–	3	8	–	4
Towson	3	–	4	6	–	5
Georgetown	2	–	5	5	–	6
Holy Cross	2	–	5	4	–	8
Bucknell	0	–	7	2	–	9
+ – Conference co-champions; ^ – NCAA Division I-AA playoff participant; Rankings from The Sports Network poll

The 2002 Towson Tigers football team was an American football team that represented Towson University during the 2002 NCAA Division I-AA football season. Towson finished fifth in the Patriot League.

In their 11th year under head coach Gordy Combs, the Tigers compiled a 6–5 record.

The Tigers outscored opponents 315 to 255. Their 3–4 conference record placed fifth out of eight in the Patriot League standings.

In August 2002, as the Tigers prepared for their Patriot League football season, the university announced that it would play just two more Patriot seasons before joining the Atlantic 10 Conference for football in 2004. The new conference would give Towson a higher level of competition, more similarly sized rivals, and the opportunity to award athletic scholarships. By joining the A-10, Towson would also gain football matchups with Delaware, Hofstra, James Madison and William & Mary, all A-10 football members that competed with Towson in other sports in their primary conference, the Colonial Athletic Association. Towson remained a Patriot League football member for 2002 and 2003.

Between the 2001 and 2002 seasons, Towson renovated and expanded its longtime home field, Minnegan Stadium, and renamed it Towson University Stadium. Towson played its home games at this facility on the university campus in Towson, Maryland.

== Schedule ==
Date	Opponent	Site	Result	Attendance	Source
September 5	Morgan State*	Towson University Stadium; Towson, MD	W 49–28	8,517	
September 14	at Lafayette	Fisher Field; Easton, PA	L 7–23	5,386	
September 21	at Brown*	Towson University Stadium; Towson, MD	W 56–42	3,198	
September 28	at Holy Cross	Fitton Field; Worcester, MA	W 42–10	7,844	
October 5	at Cornell*	Schoellkopf Field; Ithaca, NY	L 31–34 ^{2OT}	4,242	
October 12	No. 10 Lehigh	Towson University Stadium; Towson, MD	W 23–19	3,137	
October 19	Bucknell^{†}	Towson University Stadium; Towson, MD	W 20–14	5,064	
October 26	Colgate	Towson University Stadium; Towson, MD	L 7–9	2,133	
November 2	at Monmouth*	Kessler Field; West Long Branch, NJ	W 20–0	1,845	
November 16	at No. 25 Fordham	Coffey Field; Bronx, NY	L 14–42	2,464	
November 23	Georgetown	Towson University Stadium; Towson, MD	L 16–24	2,465	
*Non-conference game; ^{†}Homecoming; Rankings from The Sports Network Poll released prior to the game
