= 2002 Fordham Rams football team =

American college football season

2002 Fordham Rams football

Patriot League co-champion

NCAA Division I-AA Quarterfinal, L 10–24 vs. Villanova
- Conference: Patriot League

Ranking
- Sports Network: No. 12
- Record: 10–3 (6–1 Patriot)
- Head coach: Dave Clawson (4th season)
- Offensive coordinator: Ed Foley (4th season)
- Captains: Rhamel Brown; Chris Rhodes; John San Marco
- Home stadium: Coffey Field

2002 Patriot League football standings
	Conf.			Overall
Team	W		L	W		L
No. 12 Fordham +^	6	–	1	10	–	3
No. 25 Colgate +	6	–	1	9	–	3
Lafayette	5	–	2	7	–	5
Lehigh	4	–	3	8	–	4
Towson	3	–	4	6	–	5
Georgetown	2	–	5	5	–	6
Holy Cross	2	–	5	4	–	8
Bucknell	0	–	7	2	–	9
+ – Conference co-champions; ^ – NCAA Division I-AA playoff participant; Rankings from The Sports Network poll

The 2002 Fordham Rams football team was an American football team that represented Fordham University during the 2002 NCAA Division I-AA football season. Fordham tied for first in the Patriot League before losing in the second round of the national playoffs.

In their fourth year under head coach Dave Clawson, the Rams compiled a 10–3 record. Rhamel Brown, Chris Rhodes and John San Marco were the team captains.

The Rams outscored opponents 407 to 201. Their 6–1 conference record earned the co-championship of the eight-team Patriot League. Fordham was selected, rather than co-champion Colgate, to receive the Patriot League's automatic berth in the national Division I-AA playoffs.

Unranked at the start of the year, Fordham entered the national Division I-AA top 25 in mid-November, initially at No. 25 and rising to No. 12 by season's end. As a playoff team, the Rams played away games against higher-ranked teams in the first and second rounds.

Fordham played its home games at Jack Coffey Field on the university's Rose Hill campus in The Bronx, in New York City.

== Schedule ==
Date	Opponent	Rank	Site	Result	Attendance	Source
September 7	Saint Peter's*		Coffey Field; Bronx, NY	W 43–0	3,114	
September 14	Colgate		Coffey Field; Bronx, NY	W 40–31	7,142	
September 21	at Columbia*		Wien Stadium; New York, NY (Liberty Cup)	L 11–13	3,865	
September 28	at Fairfield*		Alumni Stadium; Fairfield, CT	W 51–6	2,170	
October 5	at Georgetown		Harbin Field; Washington, DC	W 41–10	1,175	
October 12	Brown*		Coffey Field; Bronx, NY	W 24–17	1,294	
October 26	Lafayette^{†}		Coffey Field; Bronx, NY	W 33–26	4,800	
November 2	No. 16 Lehigh		Coffey Field; Bronx, NY	L 23–26 ^{OT}	5,728	
November 9	at Holy Cross		Fitton Field; Worcester, MA (rivalry)	W 37–27	6,583	
November 16	Towson	No. 25	Coffey Field; Bronx, NY	W 42–14	2,464	
November 23	at Bucknell	No. 21	Christy Mathewson–Memorial Stadium; Lewisburg, PA	W 34–7	2,012	
November 30	at No. 11 Northeastern*	No. 12	Parsons Field; Brookline, MA (NCAA Division I-AA First Round)	W 29–24	6,848	
December 7	at No. 4 Villanova*	No. 12	Villanova Stadium; Villanova, PA (NCAA Division I-AA Quarterfinal)	L 10–24	4,351	
*Non-conference game; ^{†}Homecoming; Rankings from The Sports Network Poll released prior to the game
