= 2002 Dartmouth Big Green football team =

American college football season

2002 Dartmouth Big Green football
- Conference: Ivy League
- Record: 3–7 (2–5 Ivy)
- Head coach: John Lyons (11th season)
- Captain: Kevin Noone
- Home stadium: Memorial Field

2002 Ivy League football standings
	Conf.			Overall
Team	W		L	W		L
No. 17 Penn $	7	–	0	9	–	1
Harvard	6	–	1	7	–	3
Princeton	4	–	3	6	–	4
Yale	4	–	3	6	–	4
Cornell	3	–	4	4	–	6
Dartmouth	2	–	5	3	–	7
Brown	2	–	5	2	–	8
Columbia	0	–	7	1	–	9
$ – Conference champion; Rankings from The Sports Network poll

The 2002 Dartmouth Big Green football team was an American football team that represented Dartmouth College during the 2002 NCAA Division I-AA football season. The Big Green tied for second-to-last in the Ivy League.

In its 11th season under head coach John Lyons, the team compiled a 3–7 record and was outscored 295 to 247. Kevin Noone was the team captain.

The Big Green's 1–6 conference record tied for sixth in the Ivy League standings. Dartmouth was outscored 200 to 151 by Ivy opponents.

Dartmouth played its home games at Memorial Field on the college campus in Hanover, New Hampshire.

== Schedule ==
Date	Opponent	Site	Result	Attendance	Source
September 21	at Colgate*	Andy Kerr Stadium; Hamilton, NY	L 26–30	7,368	
September 28	New Hampshire*	Memorial Field; Hanover, NH (rivalry)	L 26–29	7,928	
October 5	at No. 23 Penn	Franklin Field; Philadelphia, PA	L 14–49	8,674	
October 12	Yale	Memorial Field; Hanover, NH	W 20–17	7,112	
October 19	Holy Cross*	Memorial Field; Hanover, NH	W 44–36	5,119	
October 26	at Columbia	Wien Stadium; New York, NY	W 24–23	3,510	
November 2	Harvard^{†}	Memorial Field; Hanover, NH (rivalry)	L 26–31	8,102	
November 9	at Cornell	Schoellkopf Field; Ithaca, NY (rivalry)	L 19–21		
November 16	Brown	Memorial Field; Hanover, NH	L 18–21	1,916	
November 23	at Princeton	Princeton Stadium; Princeton, NJ	L 30–38	11,597	
*Non-conference game; ^{†}Homecoming; Rankings from The Sports Network Poll released prior to the game
