= 2003 Lafayette Leopards football team =

American college football season

2003 Lafayette Leopards football
- Conference: Patriot League
- Record: 5–6 (2–5 Patriot)
- Head coach: Frank Tavani (4th season)
- Offensive coordinator: Mike Faragalli (4th season)
- Offensive scheme: Multiple
- Defensive coordinator: John Loose (4th season)
- Base defense: 4–3
- Home stadium: Fisher Field

2003 Patriot League football standings
	Conf.			Overall
Team	W		L	W		L
No. 2 Colgate $^	7	–	0	15	–	1
No. 23 Lehigh	6	–	1	8	–	3
Fordham	4	–	3	9	–	3
Bucknell	4	–	3	6	–	6
Towson	3	–	4	6	–	6
Lafayette	2	–	5	5	–	6
Georgetown	1	–	6	4	–	8
Holy Cross	1	–	6	1	–	11
$ – Conference champion; ^ – NCAA Division I-AA playoff participant; Rankings from The Sports Network poll

The 2003 Lafayette Leopards football team represented Lafayette College as a member of the Patriot League during the 2003 NCAA Division I-AA football season. Led by fourth-year head coach Frank Tavani, the Leopards compiled an overall record of 5–6 with a mark of 2–5 in conference play, placing sixth in the Patriot League. The team played home games at Fisher Field in Easton, Pennsylvania.

All games were televised on Leopard Sports Network (LSN).

== Schedule ==
Date	Time	Opponent	Site	TV	Result	Attendance	Source
September 6	1:00 p.m.	Marist*	Fisher Field; Easton, PA	LSN	W 49–0	4,928	
September 13	1:00 p.m.	at Towson	Towson University Stadium; Towson, MD	LSN	L 13–19	1,600	
September 27	1:00 p.m.	Princeton*	Fisher Field; Easton, PA	LSN	W 28–13	7,107	
October 4	1:00 p.m.	Georgetown	Fisher Field; Easton, PA	LSN	L 10–17	2,238	
October 11	1:00 p.m.	Columbia*	Fisher Field; Easton, PA	LSN	W 41–27	8,358	
October 18	1:00 p.m.	at No. 22 Harvard*	Harvard Stadium; Boston, MA	LSN	L 27–34	8,326	
October 25	1:00 p.m.	No. 24 Fordham^{†}	Fisher Field; Easton, PA	LSN	L 30–32	8,253	
November 1	12:30 p.m.	No. 12 Colgate	Fisher Field; Easton, PA	LSN	L 31–47	4,367	
November 8	12:30 p.m.	Bucknell	Fisher Field; Easton, PA	LSN	W 35–17	3,658	
November 15	12:30 p.m.	at Holy Cross	Fitton Field; Worcester, MA	LSN	W 41–13	2,821	
November 22	12:30 p.m.	at Lehigh	Goodman Stadium; Bethlehem, PA (The Rivalry)	LSN	L 10–30	16,000	
*Non-conference game; ^{†}Homecoming; Rankings from The Sports Network Poll released prior to the game; All times are in Eastern time
