= 2003 Yale Bulldogs football team =

American college football season

2003 Yale Bulldogs football
- Conference: Ivy League
- Record: 6–4 (4–3 Ivy)
- Head coach: Jack Siedlecki (7th season)
- Home stadium: Yale Bowl

2003 Ivy League football standings
	Conf.			Overall
Team	W		L	W		L
No. 12 Penn $	7	–	0	10	–	0
Harvard	4	–	3	7	–	3
Brown	4	–	3	5	–	5
Yale	4	–	3	6	–	4
Dartmouth	4	–	3	5	–	5
Columbia	3	–	4	4	–	6
Princeton	2	–	5	2	–	8
Cornell	0	–	7	1	–	9
$ – Conference champion; Rankings from The Sports Network poll

The 2003 Yale Bulldogs football team represented Yale University in the 2003 NCAA Division I-AA football season. The Bulldogs were led by seventh-year head coach Jack Siedlecki, played their home games at the Yale Bowl and finished in a four-way tie for second in the Ivy League with a 4–3 record, 6–4 overall.

== Schedule ==
Date	Opponent	Site	Result	Attendance	Source
September 20	Towson*	Yale Bowl; New Haven, CT	W 62–28	9,715	
September 27	Cornell	Yale Bowl; New Haven, CT	W 21–7	18,617	
October 4	at Holy Cross*	Fitton Field; Worcester, MA	W 41–16	3,731	
October 12	Dartmouth	Yale Bowl; New Haven, CT	W 40–17	20,981	
October 18	at No. 18 Colgate*	Andy Kerr Stadium; Hamilton, NY	L 40–52	7,895	
October 25	at No. 13 Penn	Franklin Field; Philadelphia, PA	L 31–34 ^{OT}	16,510	
November 1	at Columbia	Wien Stadium; New York, NY	W 29–14	3,915	
November 8	Brown	Yale Bowl; New Haven, CT	L 44–55	15,442	
November 15	at Princeton	Princeton Stadium; Princeton, NJ (rivalry)	W 27–24	16,369	
November 22	Harvard	Yale Bowl; New Haven, CT (The Game)	L 19–37	53,136	
*Non-conference game; Rankings from Coaches' Poll released prior to the game

== NFL draft ==
The following Bulldog was selected in the National Football League draft following the season.

Round	Pick	Player	Position	NFL team
6	81	Nate Lawrie	TE	Tampa Bay Buccaneers
