= 2002 Lehigh Mountain Hawks football team =

American college football season

2002 Lehigh Mountain Hawks football
- Conference: Patriot League
- Record: 8–4 (4–3 Patriot)
- Head coach: Pete Lembo (2nd season)
- Defensive coordinator: Tom Gilmore (3rd season)
- Captains: Matt Salvaterra; Jeff Santacroce
- Home stadium: Goodman Stadium

2002 Patriot League football standings
	Conf.			Overall
Team	W		L	W		L
No. 12 Fordham +^	6	–	1	10	–	3
No. 25 Colgate +	6	–	1	9	–	3
Lafayette	5	–	2	7	–	5
Lehigh	4	–	3	8	–	4
Towson	3	–	4	6	–	5
Georgetown	2	–	5	5	–	6
Holy Cross	2	–	5	4	–	8
Bucknell	0	–	7	2	–	9
+ – Conference co-champions; ^ – NCAA Division I-AA playoff participant; Rankings from The Sports Network poll

The 2002 Lehigh Mountain Hawks football team was an American football team that represented Lehigh University during the 2002 NCAA Division I-AA football season. Lehigh finished fourth in the Patriot League.

In their second year under head coach Pete Lembo, the Mountain Hawks compiled an 8–4 record. Matt Salvaterra and Jeff Santacroce were the team captains.

The Mountain Hawks outscored opponents 319 to 216. Their 4–3 conference record placed fourth out of eight in the Patriot League standings. The fourth-place finish broke a four-year streak of conference championships for Lehigh.

Lehigh was ranked No. 6 in the preseason national Division I-AA poll, and remained ranked until the final game of the season. The Mountain Hawks' ranking peaked at No. 2 in the poll released September 10 (a bye week for Lehigh), but scattered losses throughout the year saw the team drop steadily. Following their rivalry loss to Lafayette, the Mountain Hawks were unranked in the season-ending poll, and did not participate in the national playoffs for the first time since 1997.

Lehigh played its home games at Goodman Stadium on the university's Goodman Campus in Bethlehem, Pennsylvania.

== Schedule ==
Date	Opponent	Rank	Site	Result	Attendance	Source
August 29	at Buffalo*	No. 6	University at Buffalo Stadium; Amherst, NY	W 37–26	21,103	
September 7	Georgetown	No. 3	Goodman Stadium; Bethlehem, PA	W 69–0	9,368	
September 21	Princeton*	No. 3	Goodman Stadium; Bethlehem, PA	W 31–24	12,176	
September 28	at Penn*	No. 4	Franklin Field; Philadelphia, PA	L 21–24	13,275	
October 5	at No. 25 Harvard*	No. 14	Goodman Stadium; Bethlehem, PA	W 36–35	9,458	
October 12	at Towson	No. 10	Towson University Stadium; Towson, MD	L 19–23	3,137	
October 19	at Yale*	No. 19	Goodman Stadium; Bethlehem, PA	W 14–7	8,670	
October 26	at Holy Cross	No. 18	Fitton Field; Worcester, MA	W 21–12	2,247	
November 2	at Fordham	No. 16	Coffey Field; Bronx, NY	W 26–23 ^{OT}	5,728	
November 9	Colgate	No. 16	Goodman Stadium; Bethlehem, PA	L 14–28	15,023	
November 16	Bucknell	No. 23	Goodman Stadium; Bethlehem, PA	W 24–0		
November 23	at Lafayette	No. 20	Fisher Field; Easton, PA (The Rivalry)	L 7–14	13,750	
*Non-conference game; Rankings from The Sports Network Poll released prior to the game
