= 2003 Holy Cross Crusaders football team =

American college football season

2003 Holy Cross Crusaders football
- Conference: Patriot League
- Record: 1–11 (1–6 Patriot)
- Head coach: Dan Allen (8th season)
- Captains: Ari Confesor; Steve Fox; Ben Koller; Nick Larsen
- Home stadium: Fitton Field

2003 Patriot League football standings
	Conf.			Overall
Team	W		L	W		L
No. 2 Colgate $^	7	–	0	15	–	1
No. 23 Lehigh	6	–	1	8	–	3
Fordham	4	–	3	9	–	3
Bucknell	4	–	3	6	–	6
Towson	3	–	4	6	–	6
Lafayette	2	–	5	5	–	6
Georgetown	1	–	6	4	–	8
Holy Cross	1	–	6	1	–	11
$ – Conference champion; ^ – NCAA Division I-AA playoff participant; Rankings from The Sports Network poll

The 2003 Holy Cross Crusaders football team was an American football team that represented the College of the Holy Cross during the 2003 NCAA Division I-AA football season. Holy Cross tied for last in the Patriot League.

In their eighth and final year under head coach Dan Allen, the Crusaders compiled a 1–11 record. Ari Confesor, Steve Fox, Ben Koller and Nick Larsen were the team captains.

The Crusaders were outscored 478 to 322. Holy Cross' 1–6 conference record tied for worst in the Patriot League standings. The Crusaders' sole win came against fellow Patriot League cellar-dweller Georgetown.

Holy Cross played its home games at Fitton Field on the college campus in Worcester, Massachusetts.

== Schedule ==
Date	Opponent	Site	Result	Attendance	Source
September 6	at Lehigh	Goodman Stadium; Bethlehem, PA	L 20–38	8,697	
September 13	Georgetown	Fitton Field; Worcester, MA	W 42–34	6,412	
September 20	Harvard^{†}*	Fitton Field; Worcester, MA	L 23–43	10,312	
September 27	at San Diego*	Torero Stadium; San Diego, CA	L 45–46 ^{2OT}	4,449	
October 4	Yale*	Fitton Field; Worcester, MA	L 16–41		
October 11	at Towson	Johnny Unitas Stadium; Towson, MD	L 13–30	8,125	
October 18	Dartmouth^*	Fitton Field; Worcester, MA	L 20–24	7,863	
October 25	at FIU*	FIU Stadium; Miami, FL	L 23–34	4,506	
November 1	at Bucknell	Christy Mathewson–Memorial Stadium; Lewisburg, PA	L 31–53	8,132	
November 8	at No. 19 Fordham	Coffey Field; Bronx, NY (rivalry)	L 28–49	5,277	
November 15	Lafayette	Fitton Field; Worcester, MA	L 13–41	2,821	
November 22	No. 6 Colgate	Fitton Field; Worcester, MA	L 38–45	10,166	
*Non-conference game; ^{†}Homecoming; ^ Family Weekend; Rankings from The Sports Network Poll released prior to the game
