= 2003 Lehigh Mountain Hawks football team =

American college football season

2003 Lehigh Mountain Hawks football
- Conference: Patriot League
- Record: 8–3 (6–1 Patriot)
- Head coach: Pete Lembo (3rd season)
- Defensive coordinator: Tom Gilmore (4th season)
- Captains: Mike Gregorek; Tom McGeoy; Jermaine Pugh; Michael Taggart
- Home stadium: Goodman Stadium

2003 Patriot League football standings
	Conf.			Overall
Team	W		L	W		L
No. 2 Colgate $^	7	–	0	15	–	1
No. 23 Lehigh	6	–	1	8	–	3
Fordham	4	–	3	9	–	3
Bucknell	4	–	3	6	–	6
Towson	3	–	4	6	–	6
Lafayette	2	–	5	5	–	6
Georgetown	1	–	6	4	–	8
Holy Cross	1	–	6	1	–	11
$ – Conference champion; ^ – NCAA Division I-AA playoff participant; Rankings from The Sports Network poll

The 2003 Lehigh Mountain Hawks football team was an American football team that represented Lehigh University during the 2003 NCAA Division I-AA football season. Lehigh finished second in the Patriot League.

In their third year under head coach Pete Lembo, the Mountain Hawks compiled an 8–3 record. Mike Gregorek, Tom McGeoy, Jermaine Pugh and Michael Taggart were the team captains.

The Mountain Hawks outscored opponents 327 to 185. Their 6–1 conference record placed second in the eight-team Patriot League.

The Mountain Hawks were unranked in the preseason Division I-AA national poll. Two separate win streaks of three games each earned them spots in the top 25, but Lehigh only spent a total of four weeks in the poll. At the end of the year, Lehigh was ranked No. 23 in the final poll.

Lehigh played its home games at Goodman Stadium on the university's Goodman Campus in Bethlehem, Pennsylvania.

== Schedule ==
Date	Opponent	Rank	Site	Result	Attendance	Source
September 6	Holy Cross		Goodman Stadium; Bethlehem, PA	W 38–20	8,697	
September 13	No. 9 Fordham		Goodman Stadium; Bethlehem, PA	W 23–16	7,401	
September 20	at Princeton*	No. 20	Princeton Stadium; Princeton, NJ	W 28–13		
September 27	No. 21 Penn*	No. 19	Goodman Stadium; Bethlehem, PA	L 24–31	10,503	
October 4	at Connecticut*	No. 24	Rentschler Field; East Hartford, CT	L 17–35	35,322	
October 11	at Saint Mary's*		Goodman Stadium; Bethlehem, PA	W 35–7	7,642	
October 25	at Georgetown		Harbin Field; Washington, DC	W 45–24	2,123	
November 1	Towson		Goodman Stadium; Bethlehem, PA	W 35–3	13,853	
November 8	at No. 10 Colgate	No. 24	Andy Kerr Stadium; Hamilton, NY	L 10–17		
November 15	at Bucknell		Christy Mathewson–Memorial Stadium; Lewisburg, PA	W 45–9	4,032	
November 22	Lafayette		Goodman Stadium; Bethlehem, PA (The Rivalry)	W 30–10	16,000	
*Non-conference game; Rankings from The Sports Network Poll released prior to the game
