= 2002 Georgetown Hoyas football team =

American college football season

2002 Georgetown Hoyas football
- Conference: Patriot League
- Record: 5–6 (2–5 Patriot)
- Head coach: Bob Benson (10th season)
- Captains: Matt Fronczke; Ed Kuczma; Adam Rini
- Home stadium: Harbin Field

2002 Patriot League football standings
	Conf.			Overall
Team	W		L	W		L
No. 12 Fordham +^	6	–	1	10	–	3
No. 25 Colgate +	6	–	1	9	–	3
Lafayette	5	–	2	7	–	5
Lehigh	4	–	3	8	–	4
Towson	3	–	4	6	–	5
Georgetown	2	–	5	5	–	6
Holy Cross	2	–	5	4	–	8
Bucknell	0	–	7	2	–	9
+ – Conference co-champions; ^ – NCAA Division I-AA playoff participant; Rankings from The Sports Network poll

The 2002 Georgetown Hoyas football team was an American football team that represented Georgetown University during the 2002 NCAA Division I-AA football season. Georgetown finished sixth in the Patriot League.

In their tenth year under head coach Bob Benson, the Hoyas compiled a 5–6 record. Matt Fronczke, Ed Kuczma and Adam Rini were the team captains.

The Hoyas were outscored 345 to 190. Their 2–5 conference record placed sixth out of eight in the Patriot League standings.

After 23 years playing home games at Kehoe Field II, problems with the roof of Yates Field House prompted the Hoyas to find a new home for varsity football on their Washington, D.C., campus. Starting in 2002, Georgetown's football team moved into shared quarters with varsity soccer at Harbin Field.

== Schedule ==
Date	Opponent	Site	Result	Attendance	Source
September 7	at No. 3 Lehigh	Goodman Stadium; Bethlehem, PA	L 0–69	9,368	
September 14	No. 25 Holy Cross	Harbin Field; Washington, DC	L 14–41	1,276	
September 21	Fairfield*	Harbin Field; Washington, DC	W 21–3	1,749	
September 28	at FIU*	FIU Community Stadium; Miami, FL	L 2–27	6,084	
October 5	Fordham	Harbin Field; Washington, DC	L 10–41	1,175	
October 12	at Davidson*	Richardson Stadium; Davidson, NC	W 25–21	1,760	
October 19	at Lafayette	Fisher Field; Easton, PA	L 17–35	7,699	
October 26	Bucknell	Harbin Field; Washington, DC	W 32–31	1,011	
November 2	Marist*	Harbin Field; Washington, DC	W 24–17	1,124	
November 16	at Colgate	Andy Kerr Stadium; Hamilton, NY	L 22–42	3,144	
November 23	at Towson	Towson University Stadium; Towson, MD	W 24–16	2,465	
*Non-conference game; Rankings from The Sports Network Poll released prior to the game
