= 2002 Holy Cross Crusaders football team =

American college football season

2002 Holy Cross Crusaders football
- Conference: Patriot League
- Record: 4–8 (2–5 Patriot)
- Head coach: Dan Allen (7th season)
- Captains: David Dugan; Brian Hall; Nick Soivillien; Ross Sullivan
- Home stadium: Fitton Field

2002 Patriot League football standings
	Conf.			Overall
Team	W		L	W		L
No. 12 Fordham +^	6	–	1	10	–	3
No. 25 Colgate +	6	–	1	9	–	3
Lafayette	5	–	2	7	–	5
Lehigh	4	–	3	8	–	4
Towson	3	–	4	6	–	5
Georgetown	2	–	5	5	–	6
Holy Cross	2	–	5	4	–	8
Bucknell	0	–	7	2	–	9
+ – Conference co-champions; ^ – NCAA Division I-AA playoff participant; Rankings from The Sports Network poll

The 2002 Holy Cross Crusaders football team was an American football team that represented the College of the Holy Cross during the 2002 NCAA Division I-AA football season. Holy Cross finished second-to-last in the Patriot League.

In their seventh year under head coach Dan Allen, the Crusaders compiled a 4–8 record. David Dugan, Brian Hall, Nick Soivillien and Ross Sullivan were the team captains.

The Crusaders were outscored 344 to 292. Their 2–5 conference record placed seventh in the eight-team Patriot League standings.

Holy Cross began the year unranked, but after two wins to start the season—including a road win over Army, a Division I-A team—the Crusaders entered the national Division I-AA top 25. They were ranked No. 25 in the poll released September 10, and No. 23 the following week. The loss to Harvard dropped them out of the top 25, and Holy Cross remained unranked for the rest of 2002.

Holy Cross played its home games at Fitton Field on the college campus in Worcester, Massachusetts.

== Schedule ==
Date	Opponent	Site	Result	Attendance	Source
September 7	at Army*	Michie Stadium; West Point, NY	W 30–21	28,063	
September 14	at Georgetown	Harbin Field; Washington, DC	W 41–13	1,276	
September 21	at Harvard*	Harvard Stadium; Boston, MA	L 23–28	10,107	
September 28	Towson^{†}	Fitton Field; Worcester, MA	L 10–42	7,844	
October 5	at Yale*	Yale Bowl; New Haven, CT	L 19–28	15,026	
October 12	Saint Mary's*	Fitton Field; Worcester, MA	W 24–22	1,250	
October 19	at Dartmouth*	Memorial Field; Hanover, NH	L 36–44	5,119	
October 26	No. 18 Lehigh^	Fitton Field; Worcester, MA	L 12–21	2,247	
November 2	Bucknell	Fitton Field; Worcester, MA	W 38–21	2,879	
November 9	Fordham	Fitton Field; Worcester, MA (rivalry)	L 27–37	6,583	
November 16	at Lafayette	Fisher Field; Easton, PA	L 13–42	2,207	
November 23	at Colgate	Andy Kerr Stadium; Hamilton, NY	L 20–25	1,562	
*Non-conference game; ^{†}Homecoming; ^ Family Weekend; Rankings from The Sports Network Poll released prior to the game
