= 2003 Colgate Raiders football team =

American college football season

2003 Colgate Raiders football

Patriot League champion

NCAA Division I-AA National Championship Game, L 0-40 vs. Delaware
- Conference: Patriot League
- Record: 15–1 (7–0 Patriot)
- Head coach: Dick Biddle (8th season)
- Captains: John Frieser; Tem Lukabu; Sean McCune
- Home stadium: Andy Kerr Stadium

2003 Patriot League football standings
	Conf.			Overall
Team	W		L	W		L
No. 2 Colgate $^	7	–	0	15	–	1
No. 23 Lehigh	6	–	1	8	–	3
Fordham	4	–	3	9	–	3
Bucknell	4	–	3	6	–	6
Towson	3	–	4	6	–	6
Lafayette	2	–	5	5	–	6
Georgetown	1	–	6	4	–	8
Holy Cross	1	–	6	1	–	11
$ – Conference champion; ^ – NCAA Division I-AA playoff participant; Rankings from The Sports Network poll

The 2003 Colgate Raiders football team was an American football team that represented Colgate University during the 2003 NCAA Division I-AA football season. Colgate was undefeated in the regular season, won the Patriot League championship and played in the Division I-AA national championship game.

In its eighth season under head coach Dick Biddle, the team compiled a 15–1 record (12–0 in the regular season). John Frieser, Tem Lukabu and Sean McCune were the team captains.

The Raiders outscored opponents 480 to 303. Colgate's undefeated (7–0) conference record placed first in the Patriot League standings.

Colgate started the year unranked in the Division I-AA national poll, but as the season-long win streak developed, the Raiders steadily climbed in the rankings. They debuted at No. 24 in mid-September and were ranked No. 6 at the end of the regular season.

The Raiders were seeded No. 4 in the Division I-AA national playoffs. After three playoff wins, Colgate lost to Delaware in the national championship game. In the final poll of the year, Delaware was ranked No. 1 and Colgate No. 2.

Colgate played its home games, including its first two playoff games, at Andy Kerr Stadium in Hamilton, New York.

== Schedule ==
Date	Opponent	Rank	Site	Result	Attendance	Source
September 6	at Georgetown		Harbin Field; Washington, DC	W 20–19	2,406	
September 13	at Buffalo*		University at Buffalo Stadium; Amherst, NY	W 38–15	20,324	
September 20	at Dartmouth*	No. 24	Memorial Field; Hanover, NH	W 31–9	6,920	
September 27	Towson	No. 22	Andy Kerr Stadium; Hamilton, NY	W 26–7	7,467	
October 4	at Cornell*	No. 19	Schoellkopf Field; Ithaca, NY (rivalry)	W 27–24	4,142	
October 11	at Princeton*	No. 17	Princeton Stadium; Princeton, NJ	W 30–3	14,096	
October 18	Yale*	No. 18	Andy Kerr Stadium; Hamilton, NY	W 52–40	7,895	
October 25	Bucknell	No. 16	Andy Kerr Stadium; Hamilton, NY	W 50–6	8,655	
November 1	at Lafayette	No. 12	Fisher Field; Easton, PA	W 47–31		
November 8	No. 24 Lehigh	No. 10	Andy Kerr Stadium; Hamilton, NY	W 17–10		
November 15	Fordham	No. 7	Andy Kerr Stadium; Hamilton, NY	W 14–3	4,673	
November 22	at Holy Cross	No. 6	Fitton Field; Worcester, MA	W 45–38	10,166	
November 29	No. 5 UMass*	No. 6	Andy Kerr Stadium; Hamilton, NY (Div. I-AA playoffs)	W 19–7	4,197	
December 6	No. 10 Western Illinois*	No. 6	Andy Kerr Stadium; Hamilton, NY (Div. I-AA playoffs)	W 28–27	5,287	
December 13	at No. 13 Florida Atlantic*	No. 6	FAU Stadium; Boca Raton, FL (Div. I-AA playoffs)	W 36–24	12,857	
December 19	vs. No. 3 Delaware*	No. 6	Finley Stadium; Chattanooga, TN (Div. I-AA championship)	L 0–40	14,281	
*Non-conference game; Rankings from The Sports Network Poll released prior to the game
