= 2002 Lafayette Leopards football team =

American college football season

2002 Lafayette Leopards football
- Conference: Patriot League
- Record: 7–5 (5–2 Patriot)
- Head coach: Frank Tavani (3rd season)
- Offensive coordinator: Mike Faragalli (3rd season)
- Offensive scheme: Multiple
- Defensive coordinator: John Loose (3rd season)
- Base defense: 4–3
- Home stadium: Fisher Field

2002 Patriot League football standings
	Conf.			Overall
Team	W		L	W		L
No. 12 Fordham +^	6	–	1	10	–	3
No. 25 Colgate +	6	–	1	9	–	3
Lafayette	5	–	2	7	–	5
Lehigh	4	–	3	8	–	4
Towson	3	–	4	6	–	5
Georgetown	2	–	5	5	–	6
Holy Cross	2	–	5	4	–	8
Bucknell	0	–	7	2	–	9
+ – Conference co-champions; ^ – NCAA Division I-AA playoff participant; Rankings from The Sports Network poll

The 2002 Lafayette Leopards football team represented Lafayette College as a member of the Patriot League during the 2002 NCAA Division I-AA football season. Led by third-year head coach Frank Tavani, the Leopards compiled an overall record of 7–5 with a mark of 5–2 in conference play, placing third in the Patriot League. The team played home games at Fisher Field in Easton, Pennsylvania.

Most games were broadcast on the Lafayette Sports Network (LSN).

== Schedule ==
Date	Time	Opponent	Site	TV	Result	Attendance	Source
September 7	1:00 p.m.	Monmouth*	Fisher Field; Easton, PA	LSN	W 30–29	5,223	
September 14	1:00 p.m.	Towson	Fisher Field; Easton, PA	LSN	W 23–7	5,386	
September 21	1:00 p.m.	Penn*	Fisher Field; Easton, PA	LSN	L 21–52	7,947	
September 28	7:00 p.m.	at Princeton*	Princeton Stadium; Princeton, NJ	LSN	L 19–34	13,275	
October 5	1:00 p.m.	at Duquesne*	Rooney Field; Pittsburgh, PA		L 22–23	4,907	
October 12	1:30 p.m.	at Columbia*	Wien Stadium; New York, NY		W 28–21	1,306	
October 19	1:30 p.m.	Georgetown^{†}	Fisher Field; Easton, PA	LSN	W 35–17	7,699	
October 26	1:00 p.m.	at Fordham	Coffey Field; Bronx, NY	LSN	L 26–33	4,800	
November 2	12:30 p.m.	at Colgate	Andy Kerr Stadium; Hamilton, NY	LSN	L 24–31	3,136	
November 9	12:30 p.m.	Bucknell	Christy Mathewson–Memorial Stadium; Lewisburg, PA	LSN	W 19–3	6,202	
November 16	12:30 p.m.	Holy Cross	Fisher Field; Easton, PA	LSN	W 42–13	2,207	
November 23	12:30 p.m.	No. 20 Lehigh	Fisher Field; Easton, PA (The Rivalry)	LSN	W 14–7	13,750	
*Non-conference game; ^{†}Homecoming; Rankings from The Sports Network Poll released prior to the game; All times are in Eastern time
