= 2003 Dartmouth Big Green football team =

American college football season

2003 Dartmouth Big Green football
- Conference: Ivy League
- Record: 5–5 (4–3 Ivy)
- Head coach: John Lyons (12th season)
- Captains: Casey Cramer; Clayton Smith
- Home stadium: Memorial Field

2003 Ivy League football standings
| | Conf. | | | Overall |
| Team | W | | L | W | | L |
|---|---|---|---|---|---|---|
| No. 12 Penn $ | 7 | – | 0 | 10 | – | 0 |
| Harvard | 4 | – | 3 | 7 | – | 3 |
| Brown | 4 | – | 3 | 5 | – | 5 |
| Yale | 4 | – | 3 | 6 | – | 4 |
| Dartmouth | 4 | – | 3 | 5 | – | 5 |
| Columbia | 3 | – | 4 | 4 | – | 6 |
| Princeton | 2 | – | 5 | 2 | – | 8 |
| Cornell | 0 | – | 7 | 1 | – | 9 |
$ – Conference champion; Rankings from The Sports Network poll

The 2003 Dartmouth Big Green football team was an American football team that represented Dartmouth College during the 2003 NCAA Division I-AA football season. Dartmouth tied for second in the Ivy League.

In their 12th season under head coach John Lyons, the Big Green compiled a 5–5 record and were outscored 261 to 211. Casey Cramer and Clayton Smith were the team captains.

The Big Green's 4–3 conference record placed them in a four-way tie for second in the Ivy League standings. Despite its winning conference record, Dartmouth was outscored 168 to 161 by Ivy opponents.

Dartmouth played its home games at Memorial Field on the college campus in Hanover, New Hampshire.

== Schedule ==
| Date | Opponent | Site | Result | Attendance | Source |
|---|---|---|---|---|---|
| September 20 | No. 24 Colgate* | Memorial Field; Hanover, NH | L 9–31 | 6,920 | |
| September 27 | at New Hampshire* | Cowell Stadium; Durham, NH (rivalry) | L 17–42 | 3,335 | |
| October 4 | No. 15 Penn | Memorial Field; Hanover, NH | L 20–33 | 5,104 | |
| October 11 | at Yale | Yale Bowl; New Haven, CT | L 17–40 | 20,981 | |
| October 18 | at Holy Cross* | Fitton Field; Worcester, MA | W 24–20 | 7,863 | |
| October 25 | Columbia^{†} | Memorial Field; Hanover, NH | W 26–21 | 8,125 | |
| November 1 | at No. 16 Harvard | Harvard Stadium; Boston, MA (rivalry) | W 30–16 | 12,186 | |
| November 8 | Cornell | Memorial Field; Hanover, NH (rivalry) | W 26–17 | 4,308 | |
| November 15 | at Brown | Brown Stadium; Providence, RI | L 21–26 | 6,270 | |
| November 22 | Princeton | Memorial Field; Hanover, NH | W 21–15 | 3,822 | |
*Non-conference game; ^{†}Homecoming; Rankings from The Sports Network Poll released prior to the game
