= Harvard–Penn football rivalry =

American college football rivalry

- Harvard Crimson Penn Quakers
- Sport: Football
- First meeting: November 2, 1881; Harvard, 2–0
- Latest meeting: November 14, 2026; Harvard, 38–24
- Next meeting: November 13, 2076

Statistics
- Total meetings: 96
- All-time series: Harvard leads, 55–39–2
- Largest victory: Harvard, 50–0 (1888)
- Longest win streak: Harvard, 9 (1973–1981)
- Current win streak: Harvard, 6 (2021–present)

Locations of Harvard and Penn

The Harvard–Penn football rivalry is an American college football rivalry between the Harvard Crimson and Penn Quakers. The first game was played in 1881.

In the first 18 games played in the series, Harvard won 13 and Penn won 5. By 1958 Penn pulled even with 14 games won by each school. There was 1 tie (1940). From 1959 through 1981 Harvard dominated the series winning 20 games to Penn's winning 2 games (1963, 1972). There was 1 tie (1965). However, in recent years the Harvard–Penn football game in mid-November has usually had Ivy League Football Championship implications. Since 1982 Harvard and Penn have won 31 Ivy League Football Championships between them. Penn has won 17 and Harvard has won 14. Penn has been undefeated 8 times in the Ivy League and Harvard has been undefeated 6 times in the Ivy League during this time span.

== Game results ==
Harvard victories	Penn victories	Tie games

No.	Date	Location	Winner	Score
1	November 2, 1881	New York, NY	Harvard	2–0
2	October 13, 1883	Cambridge, MA	Harvard	4–0
3	October 22, 1884	Cambridge, MA	Penn	4–0
4	November 25, 1886	Philadelphia, PA	Harvard	28–0
5	November 19, 1887	Cambridge, MA	Harvard	42–0
6	November 19, 1888	Philadelphia, PA	Harvard	50–0
7	November 2, 1889	Cambridge, MA	Harvard	35–0
8	November 30, 1893	Cambridge, MA	Harvard	26–4
9	November 29, 1894	Philadelphia, PA	Penn	18–4
10	November 23, 1895	Boston, MA	Penn	17–14
11	November 21, 1896	Philadelphia, PA	Penn	8–6
12	November 20, 1897	Philadelphia, PA	Penn	15–6
13	November 5, 1898	Boston, MA	Harvard	10–0
14	November 4, 1899	Philadelphia, PA	Harvard	16–0
15	November 3, 1900	Boston, MA	Harvard	17–5
16	November 9, 1901	Philadelphia, PA	Harvard	33–6
17	November 8, 1902	Boston, MA	Harvard	11–0
18	November 7, 1903	Philadelphia, PA	Harvard	17–10
19	October 29, 1904	Boston, MA	Penn	11–0
20	November 11, 1905	Philadelphia, PA	Penn	12–6
21	November 5, 1927	Philadelphia, PA	Penn	25–0
22	November 10, 1928	Boston, MA	Penn	7–0
23	October 21, 1929	Boston, MA	Penn	29–7
24	November 9, 1940	Philadelphia, PA	Tie	10–10
25	October 4, 1941	Philadelphia, PA	Penn	19–0
26	October 3, 1942	Boston, MA	Penn	19–7
27	November 3, 1956	Boston, MA	Penn	28–14
28	November 2, 1957	Philadelphia, PA	Harvard	13–6
29	November 1, 1958	Boston, MA	Penn	19–6
30	October 31, 1959	Philadelphia, PA	Harvard	12–0
31	October 29, 1960	Boston, MA	Harvard	8–0
32	November 4, 1961	Philadelphia, PA	Harvard	37–6
33	November 3, 1962	Boston, MA	Harvard	36–0
34	November 2, 1963	Philadelphia, PA	Penn	7–2
35	October 31, 1964	Boston, MA	Harvard	34–0
36	October 30, 1965	Philadelphia, PA	Tie	10–10
37	October 29, 1966	Boston, MA	Harvard	27–7
38	November 4, 1967	Philadelphia, PA	Harvard	45–7
39	November 2, 1968	Boston, MA	Harvard	28–6
40	November 1, 1969	Philadelphia, PA	Harvard	20–6
41	October 31, 1970	Boston, MA	Harvard	38–23
42	October 30, 1971	Philadelphia, PA	Harvard	28–27
43	November 4, 1972	Boston, MA	Penn	38–27
44	November 3, 1973	Philadelphia, PA	Harvard	34–30
45	November 2, 1974	Boston, MA	Harvard	39–0
46	November 1, 1975	Philadelphia, PA	Harvard	21–3
47	November 6, 1976	Philadelphia, PA	Harvard	20–8
48	November 5, 1977	Boston, MA	Harvard	34–15
49	November 11, 1978	Philadelphia, PA	Harvard	17–13

No.	Date	Location	Winner	Score
50	November 10, 1979	Boston, MA	Harvard	41–26
51	November 15, 1980	Philadelphia, PA	Harvard	28–17
52	November 14, 1981	Boston, MA	Harvard	45–7
53	November 13, 1982	Philadelphia, PA	Penn	23–21
54	November 12, 1983	Boston, MA	Harvard	28–0
55	November 10, 1984	Philadelphia, PA	Penn	38–7
56	November 16, 1985	Boston, MA	Harvard	17–6
57	November 15, 1986	Philadelphia, PA	Penn	17–10
58	November 14, 1987	Boston, MA	Harvard	31–14
59	November 12, 1988	Philadelphia, PA	Penn	52–13
60	November 11, 1989	Boston, MA	Harvard	24–15
61	November 10, 1990	Philadelphia, PA	Penn	24–20
62	November 16, 1991	Boston, MA	Harvard	22–18
63	November 14, 1992	Philadelphia, PA	Penn	21–19
64	November 13, 1993	Boston, MA	Penn	27–20
65	November 12, 1994	Philadelphia, PA	Penn	33–0
66	November 11, 1995	Boston, MA	Penn	38–21
67	November 16, 1996	Philadelphia, PA	Penn	17–12
68	November 15, 1997	Boston, MA	Harvard	33–0
69	November 14, 1998	Philadelphia, PA	Penn	41–10
70	November 13, 1999	Boston, MA	Penn	21–17
71	November 11, 2000	Philadelphia, PA	Penn	36–35
72	November 10, 2001	Boston, MA	Harvard	28–21
73	November 16, 2002	Philadelphia, PA	Penn	44–9
74	November 15, 2003	Boston, MA	Penn	32–24
75	November 13, 2004	Philadelphia, PA	Harvard	31–10
76	November 12, 2005	Boston, MA	Harvard	29–3
77	November 11, 2006	Philadelphia, PA	Penn	22–13
78	November 10, 2007	Boston, MA	Harvard	23–7
79	November 15, 2008	Philadelphia, PA	Harvard	24–21
80	November 14, 2009	Boston, MA	Penn	17–7
81	November 13, 2010	Philadelphia, PA	Penn	34–14
82	November 12, 2011	Boston, MA	Harvard	37–20
83	November 10, 2012	Philadelphia, PA	Penn	30–21
84	November 16, 2013	Boston, MA	Harvard	38–30
85	November 15, 2014	Philadelphia, PA	Harvard	34–24
86	November 14, 2015	Boston, MA	Penn	35–25
87	November 11, 2016	Philadelphia, PA	Penn	27–14
88	November 11, 2017	Boston, MA	Penn	23–6
89	November 10, 2018	Philadelphia, PA	Harvard	29–7
90	November 16, 2019	Boston, MA	Penn	24–20
91	November 13, 2021	Boston, MA	Harvard	23–7
92	November 12, 2022	Philadelphia, PA	Harvard	37–14
93	November 11, 2023	Boston, MA	Harvard	25–23
94	November 16, 2024	Philadelphia, PA	Harvard	31–28
95	November 15, 2025	Boston, MA	Harvard	45–43
96	November 14, 2026	Philadelphia, PA	Harvard	38–24
Series: Harvard leads 55–39–2

== See also ==
- List of NCAA college football rivalry games
