= 2002 Fayetteville State Broncos football team =

American college football season

2002 Fayetteville State Broncos football

Black college national champion CIAA champion

CIAA Championship Game, W 17–14 vs. Bowie State

NCAA Division II First Round, L 27–40 vs. Carson–Newman
- Conference: Central Intercollegiate Athletic Association
- Western Division

Ranking
- AFCA: No. 16
- Record: 10–2 (7–0 CIAA)
- Head coach: Kenny Phillips (3rd season)
- Home stadium: Luther "Nick" Jeralds Stadium

2002 Central Intercollegiate Athletic Association football standings
	Conf.			Overall
Team	W		L	W		L
Eastern Division
Bowie State xy	5	–	2	6	–	5
Virginia State	5	–	2	7	–	3
Virginia Union	4	–	3	6	–	4
Elizabeth City State	2	–	5	2	–	8
Western Division
No. 16 Fayetteville State xy$^	7	–	0	10	–	2
Winston-Salem State	4	–	3	4	–	6
North Carolina Central	2	–	5	4	–	6
Livingstone	2	–	5	3	–	7
Johnson C. Smith	1	–	7	2	–	8
St. Augustine's	0	–	7	0	–	8
Championship: Fayetteville State 17, Bowie State 14
$ – Conference champion; x – Division champion/co-champions; y – Championship game participant; ^ – NCAA Division II playoff participant; Rankings from AFCA poll

The 2002 Fayetteville State Broncos football team represented Fayetteville State University as a member of the Central Intercollegiate Athletic Association (CIAA) during the 2002 NCAA Division II football season. Led by third-year head coach Kenny Phillips, the Broncos compiled an overall record of 10–2 and a mark of 7–0 in conference play, and finished as CIAA champion after they defeated Bowie State in the CIAA Championship Game. Fayetteville State finished their season with a loss against Carson–Newman in the Division II playoffs. At the conclusion of the season, the Broncos were also recognized as black college national champion.

== Schedule ==
Date	Opponent	Site	Result	Source
September 7	St. Augustine's	Luther "Nick" Jeralds Stadium; Fayetteville, NC	W 62–13	
September 14	vs. Elizabeth City State	Rocky Mount Athletic Complex; Rocky Mount, NC (Down East Viking Football Classic)	W 16–0	
September 21	at Catawba*	Shuford Stadium; Salisbury, NC	L 14–27	
September 28	Livingstone	Luther "Nick" Jeralds Stadium; Fayetteville, NC	W 42–12	
October 5	at Winston-Salem State	Bowman Gray Stadium; Winston-Salem, NC	W 30–26 ^{4OT}	
October 12	North Carolina Central*	Luther "Nick" Jeralds Stadium; Fayetteville, NC	W 21–7	
October 19	Virginia State	Luther "Nick" Jeralds Stadium; Fayetteville, NC	W 20–10	
October 26	at Johnson C. Smith	American Legion Memorial Stadium; Charlotte, NC	W 30–6	
November 3	Bowie State	Luther "Nick" Jeralds Stadium; Fayetteville, NC	W 13–7	
November 9	at Virginia Union	Hovey Field; Richmond, VA	W 28–18	
November 16	vs. Bowie State	Bowman Gray Stadium; Winston-Salem, NC (CIAA Championship Game)	W 17–14	
November 23	at Carson–Newman*	Burke–Tarr Stadium; Jefferson City, TN (NCAA Division II First Round)	L 27–40	
*Non-conference game
