= 2002 NCAA Division I-AA Football Championship Game =

College football game

2002 NCAA Division I-AA Football Championship
- I-AA National Championship Game
Western Kentucky Hilltoppers	McNeese State Cowboys
(11–3)	(12–1)
Gateway	Southland
34	14
Head coach: Jack Harbaugh	Head coach: Tommy Tate
TSN / Seed; 15 / —	TSN / Seed; 1 / 1
	1	2	3	4	Total
Western Kentucky	7	10	7	10	34
McNeese State	0	6	8	0	14
- Date: December 20, 2002
- Season: 2002
- Stadium: Finley Stadium
- Location: Chattanooga, Tennessee
- Referee: A. Bellows
- Attendance: 12,360

United States TV coverage
- Network: ESPN2
- Announcers: Ron Franklin (play-by-play), Mike Gottfried (color), Adrian Karsten (sideline)

The 2002 NCAA Division I-AA Football Championship Game was a postseason college football game between the Western Kentucky Hilltoppers and the McNeese State Cowboys. The game was played on December 20, 2002, at Finley Stadium, home field of the University of Tennessee at Chattanooga. The culminating game of the 2002 NCAA Division I-AA football season, it was won by Western Kentucky, 34–14.

== Teams ==
The participants of the Championship Game were the finalists of the 2002 I-AA Playoffs, which began with a 16-team bracket.

=== Western Kentucky Hilltoppers ===
Western Kentucky started their season with a loss to Kansas State of Division I-A, and the team was 2–3 after their first five games. They then won six games in a row, to finish their regular season with an 8–3 record (7–1 in conference). Unseeded in the playoffs, the Hilltoppers defeated Murray State, second-seed Western Illinois, and third-seed Georgia Southern to reach the final. This was the first appearance for Western Kentucky in a Division I-AA championship game.

=== McNeese State Cowboys ===
McNeese State finished their regular season with a 9–1 record (6–0 in conference); their only loss was to Nebraska of Division I-A. The Cowboys, seeded first in the tournament, defeated Montana State, Montana, and Villanova to reach the final. This was the second appearance for McNeese State in a Division I-AA championship game, having lost in 1997.

== Game summary ==
=== Scoring summary ===
Scoring summary

Quarter	Time	Drive			Team	Scoring information	Score	
Quarter	Time	Plays	Yards	TOP	Team	Scoring information	WKU	MSU
1	9:36	5	27	3:01	WKU	Jeremi Johnson 16-yard touchdown reception from Jason Michael, Peter Martinez kick good	7	0
2	14:51	4	88	1:53	WKU	Jon Frazier 55-yard touchdown run, Martinez kick good	14	0
2	7:32	10	56	4:37	MSU	30-yard field goal by John Marino	14	3
2	4:55	6	43	2:37	WKU	40-yard field goal by Martinez	17	3
2	0:07	7	19	0:48	MSU	24-yard field goal by John Marino	17	6
3	11:03	4	71	1:05	WKU	Frazier 14-yard touchdown run, Martinez kick good	24	6
3	3:49	8	75	2:13	MSU	Luke Lawton 15-yard touchdown reception from Scott Pendarvis, 2-point pass good (Jeff Hamilton from Pendarvis)	24	14
4	13:49	10	79	5:00	WKU	Jason Michael 2-yard touchdown run, Martinez kick good	31	14
4	2:51	4	2	1:36	WKU	23-yard field goal by Martinez	34	14
"TOP" = time of possession. For other American football terms, see Glossary of American football.							34	14

=== Game statistics ===
	1	2	3	4	Total
Hilltoppers	7	10	7	10	34
Cowboys	0	6	8	0	14

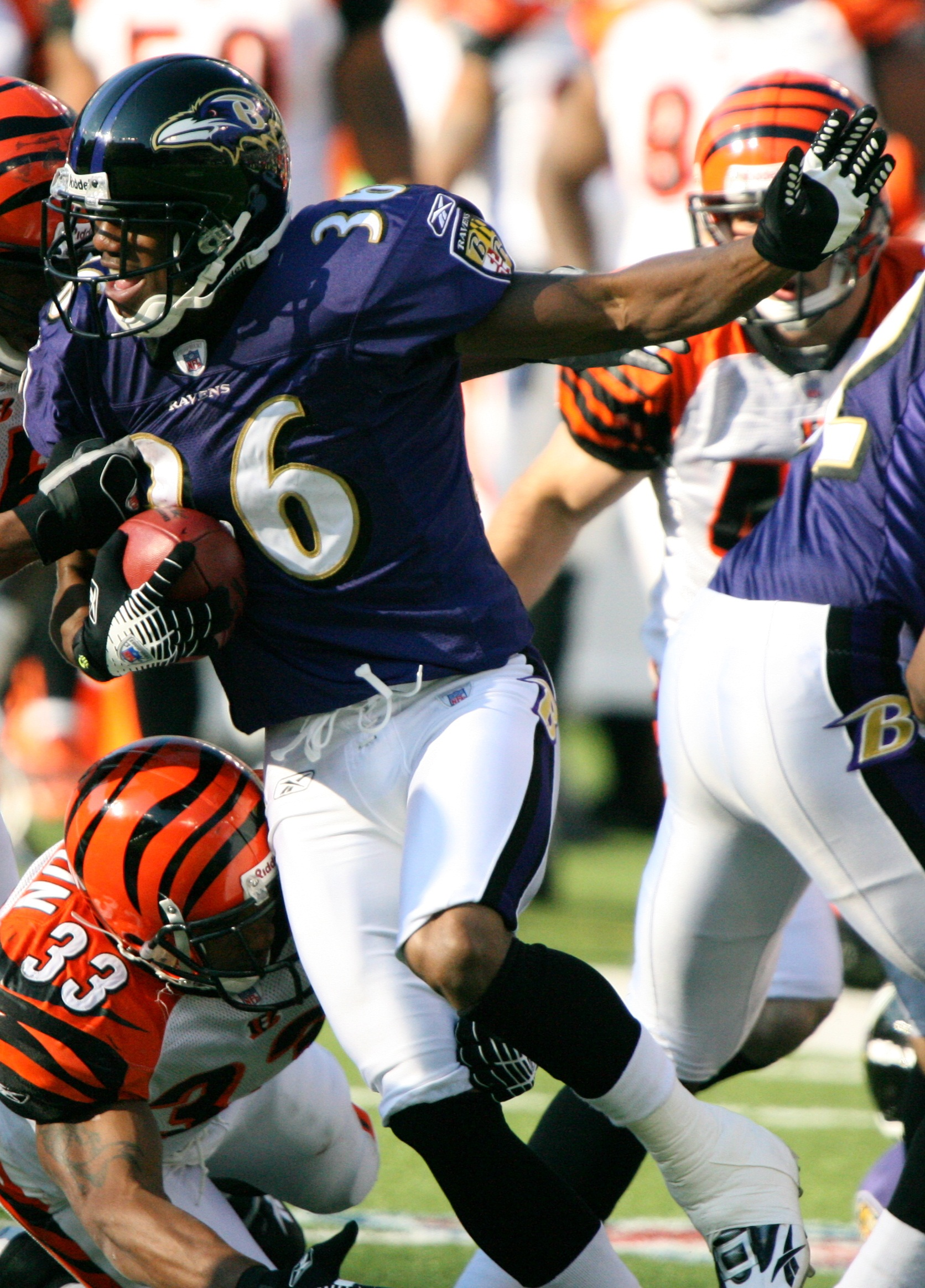
McNeese State wide receiver B. J. Sams

Statistics	WKU	MSU
First downs	13	26
Plays–yards	60–380	82–405
Rushes–yards	50–195	34–137
Passing yards	185	268
Passing: comp–att–int	6–10–0	25–48–3
Time of possession	30:18	29:42

Team	Category	Player	Statistics
Western Kentucky	Passing	Jason Michael	6–10, 185 yds, 1 TD
Western Kentucky	Rushing	Jon Frazier	27 car, 169 yds, 2 RD
Western Kentucky	Receiving	Jeremi Johnson	3 rec, 90 yds, 1 TD
McNeese State	Passing	Scott Pendarvis	21–38, 244 yds, 1 TD, 1 INT
McNeese State	Rushing	Marcus Trahan	12 car, 82 yds
McNeese State	Receiving	B. J. Sams	7 rec, 69 yds
