= 2002 Montana State Bobcats football team =

American college football season

2002 Montana State Bobcats football

Big Sky co-champion

NCAA Division I-AA First Round, L 14–21 at McNeese State
- Conference: Big Sky Conference

Ranking
- Sports Network: No. 19
- Record: 7–6 (5–2 Big Sky)
- Head coach: Mike Kramer (3rd season)
- Defensive coordinator: Pete Kwiatkowski (3rd season)
- Home stadium: Bobcat Stadium

2002 Big Sky Conference football standings
	Conf.			Overall
Team	W		L	W		L
No. 7 Montana +^	5	–	2	11	–	3
No. 19 Montana State +^	5	–	2	7	–	6
No. 18 Idaho State +	5	–	2	8	–	3
Eastern Washington	3	–	4	6	–	5
Northern Arizona	3	–	4	6	–	5
Portland State	3	–	4	6	–	5
Sacramento State	3	–	4	5	–	8
Weber State	1	–	6	3	–	8
+ – Conference co-champions; ^ – NCAA Division I-AA playoff participant; Rankings from The Sports Network poll

The 2002 Montana State Bobcats football team was an American football team that represented Montana State University in the Big Sky Conference (Big Sky) during the 2002 NCAA Division I-AA football season. In their third season under head coach Mike Kramer, the Bobcats compiled a 7–6 record (5–2 against Big Sky opponents) and tied for the Big Sky championship with Montana and Idaho State. Montana State lost to McNeese State in the first round of the NCAA Division I-AA Football Championship playoffs and ranked No. 19 in the final I-AA poll by The Sports Network.

== Schedule ==
Date	Time	Opponent	Rank	Site	Result	Attendance	Source
August 31		Saint Mary's*	No. 20	Bobcat Stadium; Bozeman, MT	W 27–24	8,657	
September 7	6:00 p.m.	at Stephen F. Austin*	No. 19	Homer Bryce Stadium; Nacogdoches, TX	L 13–30	7,341	
September 14		Adams State*		Bobcat Stadium; Bozeman, MT	W 31–6	10,977	
September 21		at Washington State*		Martin Stadium; Pullman, WA	L 28–45	23,713	
October 5		No. 14 (D-II) Central Washington^{†}*		Bobcat Stadium; Bozeman, MT	L 16–31	12,307	
October 12		at Idaho State		Holt Arena; Pocatello, ID	L 14–18	9,727	
October 19		Weber State		Bobcat Stadium; Bozeman, MT	W 44–10	9,577	
October 26		at Northern Arizona		Walkup Skydome; Flagstaff, AZ	L 17–20	6,722	
November 2		at Sacramento State		Hornet Stadium; Sacramento, CA	W 31–30	5,977	
November 9		Eastern Washington		Bobcat Stadium; Bozeman, MT	W 25–14	7,207	
November 16		No. 21 Portland State		Bobcat Stadium; Bozeman, MT	W 28–26	8,487	
November 23		at No. 4 Montana		Washington–Grizzly Stadium; Missoula, MT (rivalry)	W 10–7	19,879	
November 30		at No. 2 McNeese State*	No. 24	Cowboy Stadium; Lake Charles, LA (NCAA Division I-AA First Round)	L 14–21	16,211	
*Non-conference game; ^{†}Homecoming; Rankings from The Sports Network Poll released prior to the game; All times are in Mountain time
