= 2002 Humboldt State Lumberjacks football team =

American college football season

2002 Humboldt State Lumberjacks football
- Conference: Great Northwest Athletic Conference
- Record: 1–10 (0–3 GNAC)
- Head coach: Doug Adkins (3rd season)
- Home stadium: Redwood Bowl

2002 Great Northwest Athletic Conference football standings
	Conf.			Overall
Team	W		L	W		L
No. 9 Central Washington $^	3	–	0	11	–	1
Western Washington	2	–	1	6	–	4
Western Oregon	1	–	2	5	–	5
Humboldt State	0	–	3	1	–	10
$ – Conference champion; ^ – NCAA Division II playoff participant; Rankings from AFCA poll

The 2002 Humboldt State Lumberjacks football team represented Humboldt State University—now known as California State Polytechnic University, Humboldt—as a member of the Great Northwest Athletic Conference (GNAC) during the 2002 NCAA Division II football season. Led third-year head coach Doug Adkins, the Lumberjacks compiled an overall record of 1–10 with a mark of 0–3 in conference play, placing last out of four teams in the GNAC. The team was outscored its by opponents 376 to 182 for the season. Humboldt State played home games at the Redwood Bowl in Arcata, California.

== Schedule ==
Date	Opponent	Site	Result	Attendance	Source
September 7	at Southern Oregon*	Fuller Field; Ashland, OR	L 17–27		
September 21	Willamette*	Redwood Bowl; Arcata, CA	W 42–28		
September 28	Southern Oregon*	Redwood Bowl; Arcata, CA	L 10–20		
October 5	Saint Mary's*	Redwood Bowl; Arcata, CA	L 7–36		
October 12	at Azusa Pacific*	Cougar Athletic Stadium; Azusa, CA	L 22–35		
October 19	at No. 6 UC Davis*	Toomey Field; Davis, CA	L 14–49	8,150	
October 26	at Western Washington	Civic Stadium; Bellingham, WA	L 7–27		
November 2	No. 7 Central Washington	Redwood Bowl; Arcata, CA	L 14–41		
November 9	at Cal Poly*	Mustang Stadium; San Luis Obispo, CA	L 0–30		
November 16	at Western Oregon	McArthur Field; Monmouth, OR	L 14–41		
November 23	at Sacramento State*	Hornet Stadium; Sacramento, CA	L 35–42	4,730	
*Non-conference game; Rankings from AFCA Poll released prior to the game
