= 2002 Cal Poly Mustangs football team =

American college football season

2002 Cal Poly Mustangs football
- Conference: Independent
- Record: 3–8
- Head coach: Rich Ellerson (2nd season)
- Home stadium: Mustang Stadium

2002 NCAA Division I-AA independents football standings
	Conf.			Overall
Team	W		L	W		L
Saint Mary's		–		6	–	6
FIU		–		5	–	6
Samford		–		4	–	7
Cal Poly		–		3	–	8
Florida Atlantic		–		2	–	9
Savannah State		–		1	–	8
Southern Utah		–		1	–	10
Morris Brown		–		1	–	11

The 2002 Cal Poly Mustangs football team represented California Polytechnic State University, San Luis Obispo as an independent during the 2002 NCAA Division I-AA football season. Led by second-year head coach Rich Ellerson, Cal Poly compiled a record of 3–8. The team was outscored by its opponents 302 to 247 for the season. The Mustangs played home games at Mustang Stadium in San Luis Obispo, California.

== Schedule ==
Date	Opponent	Site	Result	Attendance	Source
August 29	at Toledo	Glass Bowl; Toledo, OH	L 16–44	23,074	
September 7	Northern Arizona	Mustang Stadium; San Luis Obispo, CA	L 24–31		
September 14	at Kent State	Dix Stadium; Kent, OH	L 34–37	8,410	
September 21	at Sacramento State	Hornet Stadium; Sacramento, CA	L 17–27	14,651	
September 28	No. 6 Northern Iowa	Mustang Stadium; San Luis Obispo, CA	L 26–29 ^{3OT}		
October 12	at Southern Utah	Eccles Coliseum; Cedar City, UT	W 27–21		
October 19	at Saint Mary's	Saint Mary's Stadium; Moraga, CA	L 17–35		
October 26	No. 5 (D-II) UC Davis	Mustang Stadium; San Luis Obispo, CA (rivalry)	L 14–28		
November 9	Humboldt State	Mustang Stadium; San Luis Obispo, CA	W 30–0		
November 16	at No. 20 Idaho State	Holt Arena; Pocatello, ID	L 14–24		
November 23	Weber State	Mustang Stadium; San Luis Obispo, CA	W 28–26	4,009	
Rankings from The Sports Network Poll released prior to the game
