= Kenny Phillips (American football coach) =

American football player and coach (1959–2015)

Biographical details
- Born: 1959; Greenville, North Carolina, U.S.
- Died: October 23, 2015 (aged 56); Virginia Beach, Virginia, U.S.
- Education: East Carolina University

Playing career
- 1979–1980: Chowan
- 1981–1982: East Carolina
- Positions: Defensive back, linebacker

Coaching career (HC unless noted)
- 1985–1986: East Carolina (GA)
- 1987: Chowan (assistant)
- 1988–1995: North Carolina A&T (assistant)
- 1995-1997: Ohio (assistant)
- 1997-2000: NC State (assistant)
- 2000–2012: Fayetteville State
- 2014: Hampton (DC)

Head coaching record
- Overall: 75–63
- Tournaments: 0–2 (NCAA D-II playoffs)

Accomplishments and honors

Championships
- 1 Black college national (2002); 3 CIAA (2002–2003, 2009); 4 CIAA Wester Division (2002–2004, 2009)

Awards
- 2× CIAA Coach of the Year (2002, 2009)

Kenny Phillips (1959 – October 23, 2015) was an American college football player and coach. He served as the head football coach at Fayetteville State University in Fayetteville, North Carolina from 2002 to 2012, compiling a record of 75–63. Phillips led the Fayetteville State Broncos to three Central Intercollegiate Athletic Association (CIAA) titles, in 2002, 2003, and 2009. He was named CIAA Coach of the Year twice, in 2002 and 2009. He was married to Beverly Ellison Phillips, the father of two daughters; Kendra and Kennedy and the grandfather of Brayden Jones Phillips And Kayden Phillips.

Phillips died on October 23, 2015, after a suffering from cancer.

== Head coaching record ==
Year	Team	Overall	Conference	Standing	Bowl/playoffs	AFCA^{#}
Fayetteville State Broncos (Central Intercollegiate Athletic Association) (2000–2012)
2000	Fayetteville State	3–7	2–4	T–3rd (Western)		
2001	Fayetteville State	6–4	4–2	2nd (Western)		
2002	Fayetteville State	10–2	7–0	1st (Western)	L NCAA Division II First Round	16
2003	Fayetteville State	8–3	5–2	1st (Western)		
2004	Fayetteville State	8–4	6–1	1st (Western)		
2005	Fayetteville State	6–4	4–3	T–3rd (Western)		
2006	Fayetteville State	3–7	2–4	4th (Western)		
2007	Fayetteville State	4–6	4–3	2nd (Western)		
2008	Fayetteville State	8–2	6–1	2nd (Western)		
2009	Fayetteville State	8–4	6–1	1st (Western)	L NCAA Division II First Round	
2010	Fayetteville State	5–5	4–3	4th (Western)		
2011	Fayetteville State	4–6	4–3	T–2nd (Western)		
2012	Fayetteville State	2–8	1–6	6th (Western)		
Fayetteville State:		75–63	55–33			
Total:		75–63				
National championship Conference title Conference division title or championship game berth
