= 2002 Northwestern State Demons football team =

American college football season

2002 Northwestern State Demons football

NCAA Division I-AA First Round, L 14–45 vs. Montana
- Conference: Southland Conference

Ranking
- Sports Network: No. 16
- Record: 9–4 (4–2 Southland)
- Head coach: Scott Stoker (1st season)
- Offensive coordinator: Darryl Mason (1st season)
- Defensive coordinator: J. C. Harper (1st season)
- Home stadium: Harry Turpin Stadium

2002 Southland Football League standings
	Conf.			Overall
Team	W		L	W		L
No. 2 McNeese State $^	6	–	0	13	–	2
No. 16 Northwestern State ^	4	–	2	9	–	4
No. 23 Nicholls State	3	–	3	7	–	4
Stephen F. Austin	3	–	3	6	–	5
Jacksonville State	2	–	4	5	–	6
Sam Houston State	2	–	4	4	–	7
Southwest Texas State	1	–	5	4	–	7
$ – Conference champion; ^ – NCAA Division I-AA playoff participant; Rankings from The Sports Network poll

The 2002 Northwestern State Demons football team represented Northwestern State University as a member of the Southland Conference during the 2002 NCAA Division I-AA football season. Led by first-year head coach Scott Stoker, the Demons compiled an overall record of 9–4 with a mark of 4–2 in conference play, placing in second in Southland. Northwestern advanced to the Division I-AA playoffs before losing to Montana. Northwestern State played home games at Harry Turpin Stadium in Natchitoches, Louisiana.

== Schedule ==
Date	Time	Opponent	Rank	Site	TV	Result	Attendance	Source
August 29	6:00 pm	Delta State*	No. 19	Harry Turpin Stadium; Natchitoches, LA		W 35–7	8,456	
September 7	6:00 pm	vs. Southern*	No. 16	Independence Stadium; Shreveport, LA (Port City Classic)		W 30–20	23,572	
September 14	1:00 pm	at Delaware State*	No. 13	Alumni Stadium; Dover, DE		W 34–14	3,850	
September 21	12:00 pm	at No. 8 (I-A) Georgia*	No. 10	Sanford Stadium; Athens, GA		L 7–45	86,520	
October 5	4:00 pm	Elon*	No. 9	Harry Turpin Stadium; Natchitoches, LA		W 47–20	11,259	
October 10	7:00 pm	Southwest Texas State	No. 7	Harry Turpin Stadium; Natchitoches, LA	TSAA	W 40–27	7,920	
October 19	3:00 pm	Southwestern Oklahoma State*	No. 5	Harry Turpin Stadium; Natchitoches, LA		W 38–0	7,202	
October 24	7:00 pm	at No. 22 Nicholls State	No. 3	John L. Guidry Stadium; Thibodaux, LA (rivalry)		W 21–14	7,816	
October 31	7:00 pm	Sam Houston State	No. 3	Harry Turpin Stadium; Natchitoches, LA		W 38–10	7,628	
November 9	4:00 pm	at Jacksonville State	No. 3	Paul Snow Stadium; Jacksonville, AL		L 10–19	9,844	
November 16	2:00 pm	No. 2 McNeese State	No. 7	Harry Turpin Stadium; Natchitoches, LA (rivalry)	SCTN	L 3–27	17,031	
November 23	4:00 pm	at Stephen F. Austin	No. 12	Homer Bryce Stadium; Nacogdoches, TX (rivalry)		W 42–35	8,221	
November 30	1:00 pm	at No. 9 Montana*	No. 13	Washington–Grizzly Stadium; Missoula, MT (NCAA Division I-AA First Round)	MTN	L 14–45	15,758	
*Non-conference game; Rankings from The Sports Network Poll released prior to the game; All times are in Central time
