= 2002 Southwest Texas State Bobcats football team =

American college football season

2002 Southwest Texas State Bobcats football
- Conference: Southland Football League
- Record: 4–7 (1–5 Southland)
- Head coach: Bob DeBesse (6th season)
- Offensive coordinator: Blake Miller (2nd season)
- Defensive coordinator: Mike Hudson (2nd season)
- Home stadium: Bobcat Stadium

2002 Southland Football League standings
	Conf.			Overall
Team	W		L	W		L
No. 2 McNeese State $^	6	–	0	13	–	2
No. 16 Northwestern State ^	4	–	2	9	–	4
No. 23 Nicholls State	3	–	3	7	–	4
Stephen F. Austin	3	–	3	6	–	5
Jacksonville State	2	–	4	5	–	6
Sam Houston State	2	–	4	4	–	7
Southwest Texas State	1	–	5	4	–	7
$ – Conference champion; ^ – NCAA Division I-AA playoff participant; Rankings from The Sports Network poll

The 2002 Southwest Texas State Bobcats football team was an American football team that represented Southwest Texas State University (now known as Texas State University) during the 2002 NCAA Division I-AA football season as a member of the Southland Football League. In their sixth year under head coach Bob DeBesse, the team compiled an overall record of 4–7 with a mark of 1–5 in conference play.

== Schedule ==
Date	Opponent	Site	Result	Attendance	Source
August 31	at Minnesota*	Hubert H. Humphrey Metrodome; Minneapolis, MN	L 0–42	32,209	
September 7	Texas A&M–Kingsville*	Bobcat Stadium; San Marcos, TX	W 28–21	11,861	
September 21	Texas Southern*	Bobcat Stadium; San Marcos, TX	W 17–10	13,075	
September 28	Southern Utah*	Bobcat Stadium; San Marcos, TX	W 49–19	11,909	
October 5	at No. 16 Portland State*	PGE Park; Portland, OR	L 0–16	5,807	
October 12	at No. 7 Northwestern State	Harry Turpin Stadium; Natchitoches, LA	L 27–40	7,920	
October 19	Nicholls State	Bobcat Stadium; San Marcos, TX (rivalry)	L 21–24	8,945	
November 2	Jacksonville State	Bobcat Stadium; San Marcos, TX	W 27–20	4,190	
November 9	at McNeese State	Cowboy Stadium; Lake Charles, LA	L 7–47	15,200	
November 16	Stephen F. Austin	Bobcat Stadium; San Marcos, TX	L 21–30	8,671	
November 23	at Sam Houston State	Bowers Stadium; Huntsville, TX (rivalry)	L 14–20	6,021	
*Non-conference game; Rankings from The Sports Network Poll released prior to the game
