= 2002 Portland State Vikings football team =

American college football season

2002 Portland State Vikings football
- Conference: Big Sky Conference
- Record: 6–5 (3–4 Big Sky)
- Head coach: Tim Walsh (10th season)
- Home stadium: PGE Park

2002 Big Sky Conference football standings
	Conf.			Overall
Team	W		L	W		L
No. 7 Montana +^	5	–	2	11	–	3
No. 19 Montana State +^	5	–	2	7	–	6
No. 18 Idaho State +	5	–	2	8	–	3
Eastern Washington	3	–	4	6	–	5
Northern Arizona	3	–	4	6	–	5
Portland State	3	–	4	6	–	5
Sacramento State	3	–	4	5	–	8
Weber State	1	–	6	3	–	8
+ – Conference co-champions; ^ – NCAA Division I-AA playoff participant; Rankings from The Sports Network poll

The 2002 Portland State Vikings football team was an American football team that represented Portland State University during the 2002 NCAA Division I-AA football season as a member of the Big Sky Conference. In their tenth year under head coach Tim Walsh, the team compiled an 6–5 record, with a mark of 3–4 in conference play, and finished tied for fourth in the Big Sky. The Vikings played their home games at PGE Park in Portland, Oregon.

== Schedule ==
Date	Opponent	Rank	Site	Result	Attendance	Source
August 31	Stephen F. Austin*	No. 17	PGE Park; Portland, OR	W 31–23	6,074	
September 14	North Carolina A&T*	No. 10	PGE Park; Portland, OR (Vanport Classic)	W 23–20 ^{OT}	10,012	
September 21	at No. 9 (I-A) Oregon*	No. 8	Autzen Stadium; Eugene, OR	L 0–41	56,066	
September 28	at No. 16 Northern Arizona	No. 9	Walkup Skydome; Flagstaff, AZ	L 10–14	8,752	
October 5	Southwest Texas State*	No. 16	PGE Park; Portland, OR	W 16–0	5,807	
October 12	Eastern Washington	No. 14	PGE Park; Portland, OR (rivalry)	W 34–31	5,824	
October 19	at Sacramento State	No. 12	Hornet Stadium; Sacramento, CA	W 34–20	6,785	
October 26	No. 1 Montana	No. 13	PGE Park; Portland, OR	L 21–24	12,733	
November 2	No. 19 Idaho State	No. 15	PGE Park; Portland, OR	W 27–24	5,959	
November 9	at Weber State	No. 13	Stewart Stadium; Ogden, UT	L 14–20	4,344	
November 16	at Montana State	No. 21	Bobcat Stadium; Bozeman, MT	L 26–28	8,487	
*Non-conference game; Rankings from The Sports Network Poll released prior to the game
