= 2002 Jacksonville State Gamecocks football team =

American college football season

2002 Jacksonville State Gamecocks football
- Conference: Southland Football League
- Record: 5–6 (2–4 Southland)
- Head coach: Jack Crowe (3rd season)
- Offensive coordinator: Willie J. Slater (3rd season)
- Defensive coordinator: Greg Stewart (3rd season)
- Home stadium: Paul Snow Stadium

2002 Southland Football League standings
	Conf.			Overall
Team	W		L	W		L
No. 2 McNeese State $^	6	–	0	13	–	2
No. 16 Northwestern State ^	4	–	2	9	–	4
No. 23 Nicholls State	3	–	3	7	–	4
Stephen F. Austin	3	–	3	6	–	5
Jacksonville State	2	–	4	5	–	6
Sam Houston State	2	–	4	4	–	7
Southwest Texas State	1	–	5	4	–	7
$ – Conference champion; ^ – NCAA Division I-AA playoff participant; Rankings from The Sports Network poll

The 2002 Jacksonville State Gamecocks football team represented Jacksonville State University as a member of the Southland Football League during the 2002 NCAA Division I-AA football season. Led by Third-year head coach Jack Crowe, the Gamecocks compiled an overall record of 5–6 with a mark of 2–4 in conference play, tying for fifth place in the Southland. Jacksonville State played home games at Paul Snow Stadium in Jacksonville, Alabama.

== Schedule ==
Date	Time	Opponent	Rank	Site	Result	Attendance	Source
August 31	7:00 p.m.	Alabama A&M*	No. 24	Paul Snow Stadium; Jacksonville, AL	W 20–17	16,851	
September 14	6:00 p.m.	at Mississippi State*	No. 24	Davis Wade Stadium; Starkville, MS	L 13–51	47,456	
September 21	3:30 p.m.	at Nicholls State		John L. Guidry Stadium; Thibodaux, LA	L 6–14	2,162	
September 28	7:00 p.m.	at Tennessee Tech*		Tucker Stadium; Cookeville, TN	W 35–29	6,720	
October 5	7:00 p.m.	Samford*		Paul Snow Stadium; Jacksonville, AL (rivalry)	W 37–23	8,425	
October 12	2:00 p.m.	Sam Houston State		Paul Snow Stadium; Jacksonville, AL	W 28–22	6,449	
October 19	7:00 p.m.	at No. 2 McNeese State		Cowboy Stadium; Lake Charles, LA	L 20–28	15,600	
October 26	2:00 p.m.	Stephen F. Austin		Paul Snow Stadium; Jacksonville, AL	L 28–36	4,888	
November 2	2:00 p.m.	at Southwest Texas State		Bobcat Stadium; San Marcos, TX	L 20–27	4,190	
November 9	4:00 p.m.	No. 3 Northwestern State		Paul Snow Stadium; Jacksonville, AL	W 19–10	9,844	
November 16	12:00 p.m.	at No. 4 Georgia Southern*		Paulson Stadium; Statesboro, GA	L 3–41	8,544	
*Non-conference game; Rankings from The Sports Network Poll released prior to the game; All times are in Central time
