= 2002 McNeese State Cowboys football team =

American college football season

2002 McNeese State Cowboys football

Southland champion

NCAA Division I-AA Championship Game, L 14–34 vs. Western Kentucky
- Conference: Southland Football League

Ranking
- Sports Network: No. 2
- Record: 13–2 (6–0 Southland)
- Head coach: Tommy Tate (3rd season)
- Offensive coordinator: Matt Viator (3rd season)
- Defensive coordinator: Lance Guidry (1st season)
- Home stadium: Cowboy Stadium

2002 Southland Football League standings
	Conf.			Overall
Team	W		L	W		L
No. 2 McNeese State $^	6	–	0	13	–	2
No. 16 Northwestern State ^	4	–	2	9	–	4
No. 23 Nicholls State	3	–	3	7	–	4
Stephen F. Austin	3	–	3	6	–	5
Jacksonville State	2	–	4	5	–	6
Sam Houston State	2	–	4	4	–	7
Southwest Texas State	1	–	5	4	–	7
$ – Conference champion; ^ – NCAA Division I-AA playoff participant; Rankings from The Sports Network poll

The 2002 McNeese State Cowboys football team represented McNeese State University as a member of the Southland Football League during the 2002 NCAA Division I-AA football season. Led by third-year head coach Tommy Tate, the Cowboys compiled an overall record of 13–2 with a mark of 6–0 in conference play, winning the Southland title. McNeese State advanced to the NCAA Division I-AA Football Championship playoffs, beating Montana State in the first round, Montana in the quarterfinals, and Villanova in the semifinals, before losing to Western Kentucky in the NCAA Division I-AA Championship Game. The team played home games at Cowboy Stadium in Lake Charles, Louisiana.

== Schedule ==
Date	Opponent	Rank	Site	Result	Attendance	Source
August 31	No. 10 Grambling State*	No. 11	Cowboy Stadium; Lake Charles, LA	W 52–20	20,300	
September 7	at No. 8 Youngstown State*	No. 6	Stambaugh Stadium; Youngstown, OH	W 28–13	17,829	
September 14	at Louisiana–Monroe*	No. 3	Malone Stadium; Monroe, LA	W 24–19	10,091	
September 28	Western Kentucky*	No. 2	Cowboy Stadium; Lake Charles, LA	W 38–13	16,840	
October 5	at Nebraska*	No. 2	Memorial Stadium; Lincoln, NE	L 14–38	77,192	
October 19	Jacksonville State	No. 2	Cowboy Stadium; Lake Charles, LA	W 28–20	15,600	
October 26	at Sam Houston State	No. 2	Bowers Stadium; Huntsville, TX	W 47–10	6,110	
November 2	Stephen F. Austin	No. 2	Homer Bryce Stadium; Nacogdoches, TX	W 42–13	8,437	
November 9	Southwest Texas State	No. 2	Cowboy Stadium; Lake Charles, LA	W 47–7	15,200	
November 16	at No. 7 Northwestern State	No. 2	Harry Turpin Stadium; Natchitoches, LA (rivalry)	W 27–3	17,031	
November 23	No. 17 Nicholls State	No. 1	Cowboy Stadium; Lake Charles, LA	W 33–21	8,221	
November 30	No. 24 Montana State*	No. 1	Cowboy Stadium; Lake Charles, LA (NCAA Division I-AA First Round)	W 21–14	16,211	
December 7	No. 9 Montana*	No. 1	Cowboy Stadium; Lake Charles, LA (NCAA Division I-AA Quarterfinal)	W 24–20	15,758	
December 14	No. 12 Villanova*	No. 1	Cowboy Stadium; Lake Charles, LA (NCAA Division I-AA Semifinal)	W 39–28	16,517	
December 20	No. 15 Western Kentucky*	No. 1	Finley Stadium; Chattanooga, TN (NCAA Division I-AA Championship Game)	L 14–34	12,360	
*Non-conference game; Rankings from The Sports Network Poll released prior to the game
