= Bob DeBesse =

American football coach

Biographical details
- Born: September 30, 1959 (age 67); Boston, Massachusetts, U.S.

Playing career
- 1978–1980: Southwest Texas State

Coaching career (HC unless noted)
- 1981–1982: Southwest Texas State (GA)
- 1983–1989: TCU (RB/QB)
- 1990–1991: TCU (OC)
- 1992–1996: Minnesota (OC)
- 1997–2002: Southwest Texas State
- 2003–2005: Purdue (WR)
- 2006–2007: Texas A&M (WR)
- 2008–2009: A&M Consolidated HS (TX) (assistant)
- 2010–2011: Sam Houston State (OC)
- 2012–2017: New Mexico (OC/QB)
- 2018–2020: Georgia Southern (OC/QB)

Head coaching record
- Overall: 27–39

Robert Damien DeBesse (born September 30, 1959) is an American football coach. He was most recently the offensive coordinator and quarterbacks coach of the Georgia Southern Eagles. He was relieved of his duties by Head Coach Chad Lunsford during the 2020 season.

DeBesse attended Stratford High School in Houston, Texas and earned his Bachelor of Science in education at the Southwest Texas State University in 1982.

He began his coaching career as a graduate assistant at Southwest Texas State, before being hired as an offensive assistant to Jim Wacker at Texas Christian University. In 1990 he was appointed offensive coordinator. DeBesse followed Wacker to Minnesota in 1992. He succeeded Jim Bob Helduser as head coach at his alma mater in 1997. After mediocre success, DeBesse was replaced by Manny Matsakis in 2003. He joined Joe Tiller's staff at Purdue as wide receivers coach.

From 2006 to 2007, he coached the same position under Dennis Franchione at Texas A&M. Coach Dennis Franchione resigned from Texas A&M University at the end of the 2007. Bob Debesse wasn't retained by the newly hired head coach of Texas A&M University and has since been hired to coach the defensive backs at A&M Consolidated High School located in College Station, Texas. In January 2010 DeBesse was hired as the offensive coordinator at Sam Houston State University. Following his time at SHSU, he spent five years as OC at New Mexico. Debesse then became Offensive Coordinator at Georgia Southern.

== Head coaching record ==
Year	Team	Overall	Conference	Standing	Bowl/playoffs
Southwest Texas State Bobcats (Southland Conference) (1997–2002)
1997	Southwest Texas State	5–6	2–5	T–6th	
1998	Southwest Texas State	4–7	2–5	T–6th	
1999	Southwest Texas State	3–8	2–5	6th	
2000	Southwest Texas State	7–4	5–2	T–2nd	
2001	Southwest Texas State	4–7	0–6	7th	
2002	Southwest Texas State	4–7	1–5	7th	
Southwest Texas State:		27-39	12–28		
Total:		27-39			
