= 2002 Eastern Washington Eagles football team =

American college football season

2002 Eastern Washington Eagles football
- Conference: Big Sky Conference
- Record: 6–5 (3–4 Big Sky)
- Head coach: Paul Wulff (3rd season)
- Offensive coordinator: Timm Rosenbach (2nd season)
- Defensive coordinator: Steve Kizer (3rd season)
- Home stadium: Woodward Field; Joe Albi Stadium

2002 Big Sky Conference football standings
	Conf.			Overall
Team	W		L	W		L
No. 7 Montana +^	5	–	2	11	–	3
No. 19 Montana State +^	5	–	2	7	–	6
No. 18 Idaho State +	5	–	2	8	–	3
Eastern Washington	3	–	4	6	–	5
Northern Arizona	3	–	4	6	–	5
Portland State	3	–	4	6	–	5
Sacramento State	3	–	4	5	–	8
Weber State	1	–	6	3	–	8
+ – Conference co-champions; ^ – NCAA Division I-AA playoff participant; Rankings from The Sports Network poll

The 2002 Eastern Washington Eagles football team represented Eastern Washington University as a member of the Big Sky Conference during the 2002 NCAA Division I-AA football season. Led by third-year head coach Paul Wulff, the Eagles compiled an overall record of 6–5, with a mark of 3–4 in conference play, and finished tied for fourth in the Big Sky. The team played home games at Woodward Field in Cheney and Joe Albi Stadium in Spokane, Washington.

== Schedule ==
Date	Opponent	Site	Result	Attendance	Source
August 31	at Arizona State*	Sun Devil Stadium; Tempe, AZ	L 2–38	39,581	
September 7	Montana Tech*	Woodward Field; Cheney, WA	W 50–6	3,287	
September 14	Western Oregon*	Woodward Field; Cheney, WA	W 55–20	3,463	
September 21	at Southern Utah*	Eccles Coliseum; Cedar City, UT	W 49–14	4,847	
October 5	Idaho State	Woodward Field; Cheney, WA	L 14–21	4,556	
October 12	at No. 14 Portland State	PGE Park; Portland, OR (rivalry)	L 31–34	5,824	
October 19	No. 16 Northern Arizona	Woodward Field; Cheney, WA	W 41–29	5,215	
October 26	Sacramento State	Woodward Field; Cheney, WA	L 41–48	3,563	
November 2	at Weber State	Stewart Stadium; Ogden, UT	W 38–20	4,789	
November 9	Montana State	Bobcat Stadium; Bozeman, MT	L 14–25	7,207	
November 16	No. 1 Montana	Joe Albi Stadium; Spokane, WA (EWU–UM Governors Cup)	W 30–21	17,142	
*Non-conference game; Rankings from The Sports Network Poll released prior to the game
