= 2002 UC Davis Aggies football team =

American college football season

2002 UC Davis Aggies football

NCAA Division II Quarterfinal, L 20–27 at Texas A&M–Kingsville
- Conference: Independent

Ranking
- AFCA: No. 7
- Record: 9–3
- Head coach: Bob Biggs (10th season)
- Offensive coordinator: Mike Moroski (10th season)
- Home stadium: Toomey Field

2002 NCAA Division II independents football records
	Conf.			Overall
Team	W		L	W		L
No. 7 UC Davis ^		–		9	–	3
Gannon		–		5	–	5
New Haven		–		4	–	6
Quincy		–		4	–	7
Saint Joseph's (IN)		–		4	–	7
Western New Mexico		–		2	–	7
Oklahoma Panhandle State		–		2	–	9
Kentucky Wesleyan		–		1	–	10
^ – NCAA Division II playoff participant; Rankings from AFCA poll

The 2002 UC Davis football team represented the University of California, Davis as an independent during the 2002 NCAA Division II football season. Led by tenth-year head coach Bob Biggs, UC Davis compiled an overall record of 9–3. 2002 was the 34th consecutive winning season for the Aggies. UC Davis was ranked No. 14 in the NCAA Division II poll at the end of the regular season and advanced to the NCAA Division II Football Championship playoffs for the seventh straight year. The Aggies upset previously unbeaten and fifth-ranked Central Washington before losing in quarterfinal round 20th-ranked Texas A&M–Kingsville . The team outscored their opponents 368 to 223 for the season. The Aggies played home games at Toomey Field in Davis, California.

== Schedule ==
Date	Time	Opponent	Rank	Site	Result	Attendance	Source
September 7	4:00 p.m.	at No. 1 Grand Valley State	No. 6	Lubbers Stadium; Allendale, MI	L 17–24	12,361	
September 14	6:00 p.m.	Abilene Christian	No. 11	Toomey Field; Davis, CA	W 34–17	5,776	
September 21	6:00 p.m.	North Dakota State	No. 10	Toomey Field; Davis, CA	W 35–7	7,300	
September 28	12:30 p.m.	at Western Oregon	No. 10	McArthur Field; Monmouth, OR	W 64–20	2,800	
October 5	6:00 p.m.	at Sacramento State	No. 9	Charles C. Hughes Stadium; Sacramento, CA (Causeway Classic)	W 38–21	15,831	
October 19	1:30 p.m.	Humboldt State^{†}	No. 6	Toomey Field; Davis, CA	W 49–14	8,150	
October 26	4:00 p.m.	at Cal Poly	No. 5	Mustang Stadium; San Luis Obispo, CA (rivalry)	W 28–14	8,588	
November 2	1:30 p.m.	Saint Mary's	No. 5	Toomey Field; Davis, CA	W 31–28	8,850	
November 9	12:00 p.m.	at No. 6 Central Washington	No. 5	Tomlinson Stadium; Ellensburg, WA	L 14–38	5,350	
November 16	1:00 p.m.	at Western Washington	No. 14	Civic Stadium; Bellingham, WA	W 14–7	2,565	
November 23	12:00 p.m.	at No. 5 Central Washington	No. 14	Tomlinson Stadium; Ellensburg, WA (NCAA Division II First Round)	W 24–6	4,105	
November 30	11:00 a.m.	at No. 20 Texas A&M–Kingsville	No. 14	Javelina Stadium; Kingsville, TX (NCAA Division II Quarterfinal)	L 20–27 ^{OT}	11,500	
^{†}Homecoming; Rankings from AFCA Poll released prior to the game; All times are in Pacific time
