= 2002 Weber State Wildcats football team =

American college football season

2002 Weber State Wildcats football
- Conference: Big Sky Conference
- Record: 3–8 (1–6 Big Sky)
- Head coach: Jerry Graybeal (5th season)
- Home stadium: Stewart Stadium

2002 Big Sky Conference football standings
	Conf.			Overall
Team	W		L	W		L
No. 7 Montana +^	5	–	2	11	–	3
No. 19 Montana State +^	5	–	2	7	–	6
No. 18 Idaho State +	5	–	2	8	–	3
Eastern Washington	3	–	4	6	–	5
Northern Arizona	3	–	4	6	–	5
Portland State	3	–	4	6	–	5
Sacramento State	3	–	4	5	–	8
Weber State	1	–	6	3	–	8
+ – Conference co-champions; ^ – NCAA Division I-AA playoff participant; Rankings from The Sports Network poll

The 2002 Weber State Wildcats football team represented Weber State University as a member of the Big Sky Conference during the 2002 NCAA Division I-AA football season. Led by fifth-year head coach Jerry Graybeal, the Wildcats compiled an overall record of 3–8, with a mark of 1–6 in conference play, and finished eighth in the Big Sky. The team played home games at Stewart Stadium in Ogden, Utah.

== Schedule ==
Date	Opponent	Site	Result	Attendance	Source
August 31	at New Mexico*	University Stadium; Albuquerque, NM	L 24–38	35,765	
September 14	Western State (CO)*	Stewart Stadium; Ogden, UT	W 44–0	8,023	
September 21	Eastern Oregon*	Stewart Stadium; Ogden, UT	W 56–7		
October 5	at No. 12 Northern Arizona	Walkup Skydome; Flagstaff, AZ	L 21–26	5,439	
October 12	No. 1 Montana	Stewart Stadium; Ogden, UT	L 7–39	13,383	
October 19	at Montana State	Bobcat Stadium; Bozeman, MT	L 10–44	9,577	
October 26	at No. 20 Idaho State	Holt Arena; Pocatello, ID	L 0–34	10,419	
November 2	Eastern Washington	Stewart Stadium; Ogden, UT	L 20–38	4,789	
November 9	No. 13 Portland State	Stewart Stadium; Ogden, UT	W 20–14	4,344	
November 16	at Sacramento State	Hornet Stadium; Sacramento, CA	L 38–41	4,170	
November 23	at Cal Poly*	Mustang Stadium; San Luis Obispo, CA	L 26–28	4,009	
*Non-conference game; Rankings from The Sports Network Poll released prior to the game
