= 2002 Stephen F. Austin Lumberjacks football team =

American college football season

2002 Stephen F. Austin Lumberjacks football
- Conference: Southland Conference
- Record: 6–5 (3–3 Southland)
- Head coach: Mike Santiago (4th season)
- Defensive coordinator: Kim Dameron (2nd season)
- Home stadium: Homer Bryce Stadium

2002 Southland Football League standings
	Conf.			Overall
Team	W		L	W		L
No. 2 McNeese State $^	6	–	0	13	–	2
No. 16 Northwestern State ^	4	–	2	9	–	4
No. 23 Nicholls State	3	–	3	7	–	4
Stephen F. Austin	3	–	3	6	–	5
Jacksonville State	2	–	4	5	–	6
Sam Houston State	2	–	4	4	–	7
Southwest Texas State	1	–	5	4	–	7
$ – Conference champion; ^ – NCAA Division I-AA playoff participant; Rankings from The Sports Network poll

The 2002 Stephen F. Austin Lumberjacks football team represented Stephen F. Austin State University as a member of the Southland Conference during the 2002 NCAA Division I-AA football season. Led by fourth-year head coach Mike Santiago, the Lumberjacks compiled an overall record of 6–5 with a mark of 3–3 in conference play, tying for third place in the Southland. Stephen F. Austin played home games at Homer Bryce Stadium in Nacogdoches, Texas.

== Schedule ==
Date	Time	Opponent	Rank	Site	Result	Attendance	Source
August 31	8:00 p.m.	at Portland State*		PGE Park; Portland, OR	L 23–31	6,074	
September 7	7:00 p.m.	No. 19 Montana State*		Homer Bryce Stadium; Nacogdoches, TX	W 30–13	7,341	
September 14	7:00 p.m.	Henderson State*		Homer Bryce Stadium; Nacogdoches, TX	W 55–7	10,855	
September 21	4:05 p.m.	at No. 6 Northern Iowa*		UNI-Dome; Cedar Falls, IA	L 24–31	13,142	
October 5	4:00 p.m.	Southern Utah*		Homer Bryce Stadium; Nacogdoches, TX	W 52–6	5,384	
October 12	6:30 p.m.	at Nicholls State		John L. Guidry Stadium; Thibodaux, LA	W 17–14	4,218	
October 19	4:00 p.m.	Sam Houston State	No. 23	Homer Bryce Stadium; Nacogdoches, TX (rivalry)	L 7–10	8,003	
October 26	2:00 p.m.	at Jacksonville State		Paul Snow Stadium; Jacksonville, AL	W 36–28	4,888	
November 2	4:00 p.m.	No. 2 McNeese State		Homer Bryce Stadium; Nacogdoches, TX	L 13–42	8,437	
November 16	2:00 p.m.	at Southwest Texas State		Bobcat Stadium; San Marcos, TX	W 30–21	8,671	
November 23	4:00 p.m.	No. 12 Northwestern State		Homer Bryce Stadium; Nacogdoches, TX (rivalry)	L 35–42	8,221	
*Non-conference game; Rankings from The Sports Network Poll released prior to the game; All times are in Central time
