= Jeremi Johnson =

American football player (born 1980)

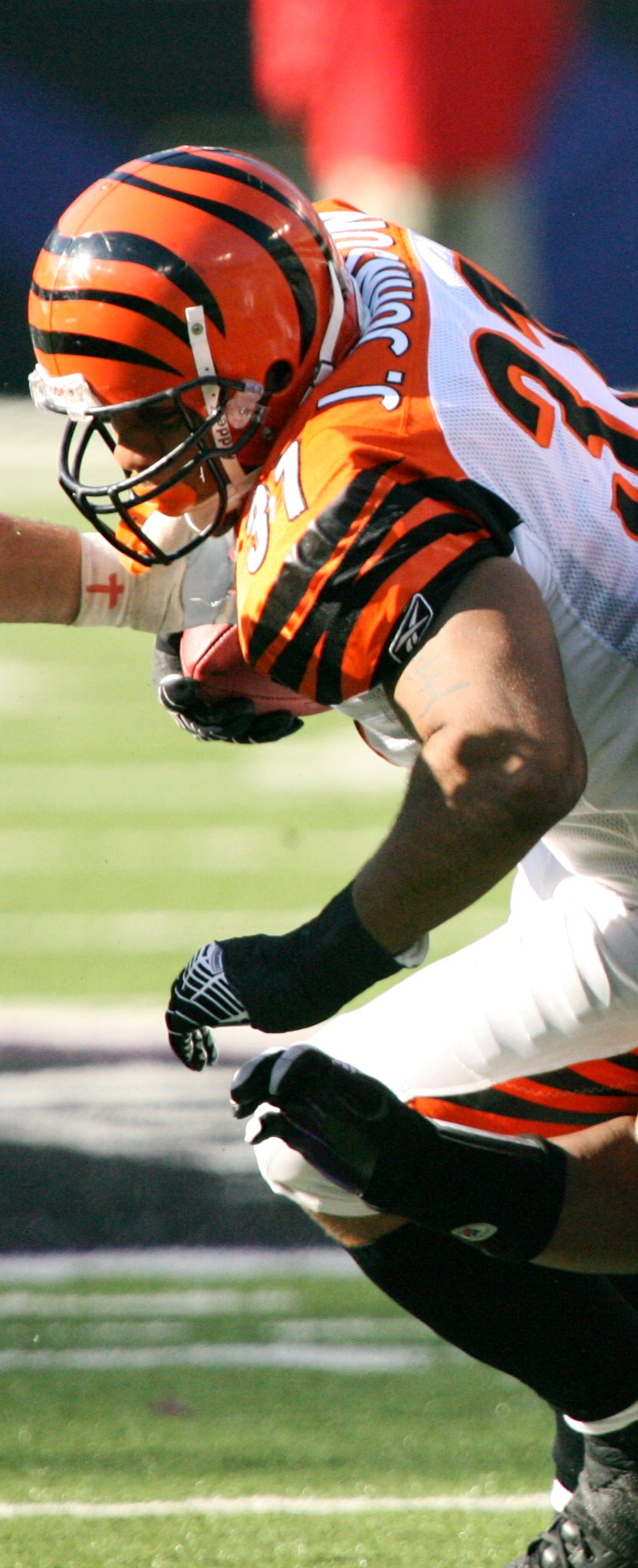
- Johnson with the Cincinnati Bengals in 2006

No. 23, 31
- Position: Fullback

Personal information
- Born: September 4, 1980 (age 46); Louisville, Kentucky, U.S.
- Listed height: 5 ft 11 in (1.80 m)
- Listed weight: 275 lb (125 kg)

Career information
- High school: Ballard (Louisville)
- College: Indiana; Western Kentucky
- NFL draft: 2003: 4th round, 118th overall pick

Career history
- Cincinnati Bengals (2003–2009)

Awards and highlights
- NCAA I-AA national champion (2002); All-Big Ten Freshman Team (1999)

Career NFL statistics
- Rushing yards: 149
- Rushing average: 2.9
- Rushing touchdowns: 2
- Receptions: 61
- Receiving yards: 310
- Receiving touchdowns: 6
- Stats at Pro Football Reference

Jeremi Ray Johnson (born September 4, 1980) is an American former professional football player who was a fullback in the National Football League (NFL). He was selected by the Cincinnati Bengals in the fourth round of the 2003 NFL draft. He played college football for the Indiana Hoosiers and Western Kentucky Hilltoppers.

== Early life ==
Johnson was a standout for Ballard High School, rushing for over 2,000 yards and scoring 35 touchdowns in his junior and senior seasons.

== College career ==
=== Indiana ===
As a collegiate player, Jeremi Johnson played his first three seasons at Indiana University Bloomington, where he was named to the All-Big Ten Conference freshman team in 1999. However, in 2002, Johnson suffered a hamstring injury in spring practice.

=== Western Kentucky ===
Jeremi Johnson transferred to Western Kentucky University for his senior season, where he was a key player on the Hilltoppers' NCAA Division I-AA championship team.

== Professional career ==
Pre-draft measurables
Height	Weight	Arm length	Hand span	40-yard dash	10-yard split	20-yard split	Vertical jump	Broad jump	Bench press
5 ft 11 in (1.80 m)	260 lb (118 kg)	31 1/8 in (0.79 m)	8 1/2 in (0.22 m)	4.91 s	1.68 s	2.87 s	29 in (0.74 m)	8 ft 7 in (2.62 m)	20 reps
All values from NFL Combine.

Johnson was selected by the Cincinnati Bengals in the fourth round (118th overall) of the 2003 NFL draft. He was released with an injury settlement on November 26, 2008.

The Bengals re-signed Johnson on April 24, 2009. Johnson became a free agent. He has not signed with another team since.
