= 2002 Sam Houston State Bearkats football team =

American college football season

2002 Sam Houston State Bearkats football
- Conference: Southland Football League
- Record: 4–7 (2–4 Southland)
- Head coach: Ron Randleman (21st season)
- Defensive coordinator: Mike Lucas (13th season)
- Home stadium: Bowers Stadium

2002 Southland Football League standings
	Conf.			Overall
Team	W		L	W		L
No. 2 McNeese State $^	6	–	0	13	–	2
No. 16 Northwestern State ^	4	–	2	9	–	4
No. 23 Nicholls State	3	–	3	7	–	4
Stephen F. Austin	3	–	3	6	–	5
Jacksonville State	2	–	4	5	–	6
Sam Houston State	2	–	4	4	–	7
Southwest Texas State	1	–	5	4	–	7
$ – Conference champion; ^ – NCAA Division I-AA playoff participant; Rankings from The Sports Network poll

The 2002 Sam Houston State Bearkats football team represented Sam Houston State University as a member of the Southland Football League during the 2002 NCAA Division I-AA football season. Led by 21st-year head coach Ron Randleman, the Bearkats compiled an overall record of 4–7 with a mark of 2–4 in conference play, and finished tied for fifth in the Southland.

== Schedule ==
Date	Opponent	Rank	Site	Result	Attendance	Source
August 29	at Central Michigan*	No. 12	Kelly/Shorts Stadium; Mount Pleasant, MI	L 10–34	18,826	
September 7	Midwestern State (TX)*	No. 14	Bowers Stadium; Huntsville, TX	W 26–23	7,126	
September 14	at Northern Arizona*	No. 14	Walkup Skydome; Flagstaff, AZ	L 14–40	6,019	
September 21	Mississippi Valley State*		Bowers Stadium; Huntsville, TX	W 45–7	9,045	
September 28	at No. 12 Western Illinois*		Hanson Field; Macomb, IL	L 13–41	15,318	
October 12	at Jacksonville State		Paul Snow Stadium; Jacksonville, AL	L 22–28	6,449	
October 19	at No. 23 Stephen F. Austin		Homer Bryce Stadium; Nacogdoches, TX (Battle of the Piney Woods)	W 10–7	8,003	
October 26	No. 2 McNeese State		Bowers Stadium; Huntsville, TX	L 10–47	6,110	
October 31	at No. 3 Northwestern State		Harry Turpin Stadium; Natchitoches, LA	L 10–38	7,628	
November 9	No. 22 Nicholls State		Bowers Stadium; Huntsville, TX	L 16–34	3,016	
November 23	Southwest Texas State		Bowers Stadium; Huntsville, TX (rivalry)	W 20–14	6,021	
*Non-conference game; Rankings from The Sports Network Poll released prior to the game
