= 2002 Nicholls State Colonels football team =

American college football season

2002 Nicholls State Colonels football
- Conference: Southland Football League
- Record: 7–4 (3–3 Southland)
- Head coach: Daryl Daye (4th season)
- Offensive coordinator: Jeff Richards (2nd season)
- Defensive coordinator: Jay Thomas (4th season)
- Home stadium: John L. Guidry Stadium

2002 Southland Football League standings
	Conf.			Overall
Team	W		L	W		L
No. 2 McNeese State $^	6	–	0	13	–	2
No. 16 Northwestern State ^	4	–	2	9	–	4
No. 23 Nicholls State	3	–	3	7	–	4
Stephen F. Austin	3	–	3	6	–	5
Jacksonville State	2	–	4	5	–	6
Sam Houston State	2	–	4	4	–	7
Southwest Texas State	1	–	5	4	–	7
$ – Conference champion; ^ – NCAA Division I-AA playoff participant; Rankings from The Sports Network poll

The 2002 Nicholls State Colonels football team represented Nicholls State University as a member of the Southland Football League during the 2002 NCAA Division I-AA football season. Led by fourth-year head Daryl Daye, the Colonels compiled an overall record of 7–4 with a mark of 3–3 in conference play, tying for third place in the Southland. Nicholls State played home games at John L. Guidry Stadium in Thibodaux, Louisiana.

== Schedule ==
Date	Time	Opponent	Rank	Site	Result	Attendance	Source
August 29	6:30 p.m.	West Virginia Tech*		John L. Guidry Stadium; Thibodaux, LA	W 63–6	3,165	
September 7	7:00 p.m.	at North Texas*		Fouts Field; Denton, TX	L 0–23	12,816	
September 14	6:00 p.m.	at Samford*		Seibert Stadium; Homewood, AL	W 45–17	3,648	
September 21	3:30 p.m.	Jacksonville State		John L. Guidry Stadium; Thibodaux, LA	W 14–6	2,162	
September 28	7:00 p.m.	at Southern*		A. W. Mumford Stadium; Baton Rouge, LA	W 21–13	17,863	
October 5	3:30 p.m.	Florida Atlantic*	No. 24	John L. Guidry Stadium; Thibodaux, LA	W 33–22	2,811	
October 12	6:30 p.m.	Stephen F. Austin		John L. Guidry Stadium; Thibodaux, LA	L 14–17	4,218	
October 19	3:00 p.m.	at Southwest Texas State		Bobcat Stadium; San Marcos, TX (rivalry)	W 24–21	8,945	
October 24	7:00 p.m.	No. 3 Northwestern State	No. 22	John L. Guidry Stadium; Thibodaux, LA (rivalry)	L 14–21	7,816	
November 9	2:00 p.m.	at Sam Houston State	No. 22	Bowers Stadium; Huntsville, TX	W 34–16	3,016	
November 23	1:00 p.m.	at No. 1 McNeese State	No. 17	Cowboy Stadium; Lake Charles, LA	L 21–33	14,129	
*Non-conference game; Rankings from The Sports Network Poll released prior to the game; All times are in Central time
