= 2002 Sacramento State Hornets football team =

American college football season

2002 Sacramento State Hornets football
- Conference: Big Sky Conference
- Record: 5–7 (3–4 Big Sky)
- Head coach: John Volek (8th season)
- Home stadium: Hornet Stadium

2002 Big Sky Conference football standings
	Conf.			Overall
Team	W		L	W		L
No. 7 Montana +^	5	–	2	11	–	3
No. 19 Montana State +^	5	–	2	7	–	6
No. 18 Idaho State +	5	–	2	8	–	3
Eastern Washington	3	–	4	6	–	5
Northern Arizona	3	–	4	6	–	5
Portland State	3	–	4	6	–	5
Sacramento State	3	–	4	5	–	8
Weber State	1	–	6	3	–	8
+ – Conference co-champions; ^ – NCAA Division I-AA playoff participant; Rankings from The Sports Network poll

The 2002 Sacramento State Hornets football team represented California State University, Sacramento as a member of the Big Sky Conference during the 2002 NCAA Division I-AA football season. Led by John Volek in his eighth and final season as head coach, Sacramento State compiled an overall record of 5–7 with a mark of 3–4 in conference play, placing in a four-way tie for fourth in the Big Sky. The team was outscored by its opponents 380 to 325 for the season. The Hornets played home games at Hornet Stadium in Sacramento, California.

Volek finished his tenure at Sacramento State with a record of 31–57–1, for a .354 winning percentage.

== Schedule ==
Date	Opponent	Site	Result	Attendance	Source
August 31	at UTEP*	Sun Bowl; El Paso, TX	L 12–42	30,536	
September 7	at Saint Mary's*	Saint Mary's Stadium; Moraga, CA	L 12–20	2,810	
September 21	Cal Poly*	Hornet Stadium; Sacramento, CA	W 27–17	14,651	
September 28	at Idaho State	Holt Arena; Pocatello, ID	L 24–32		
October 5	No. 9 (D-II) UC Davis*	Charles C. Hughes Stadium; Sacramento, CA (Causeway Classic)	L 21–38	15,831	
October 12	at No. 8 Northern Arizona	Walkup Skydome; Flagstaff, AZ	W 24–21	9,126	
October 19	No. 12 Portland State	Hornet Stadium; Sacramento, CA	L 20–34	6,785	
October 26	at Eastern Washington	Woodward Field; Cheney, WA	W 48–41	3,563	
November 2	Montana State	Hornet Stadium; Sacramento, CA	L 30–31	5,977	
November 9	at No. 1 Montana	Washington–Grizzly Stadium; Missoula, MT	L 24–31	19,174	
November 16	Weber State	Hornet Stadium; Sacramento, CA	W 41–38	4,170	
November 23	Humboldt State*	Hornet Stadium; Sacramento, CA	W 42–35	4,730	
*Non-conference game; Rankings from The Sports Network Poll released prior to the game
