= 2002 Samford Bulldogs football team =

American college football season

2002 Samford Bulldogs football
- Conference: Independent
- Record: 4–7
- Head coach: Bill Gray (2nd season)
- Offensive coordinator: Bill Gray (2nd season)
- Defensive coordinator: Mike O'Toole (3rd season)
- Home stadium: Seibert Stadium

2002 NCAA Division I-AA independents football standings
	Conf.			Overall
Team	W		L	W		L
Saint Mary's		–		6	–	6
FIU		–		5	–	6
Samford		–		4	–	7
Cal Poly		–		3	–	8
Florida Atlantic		–		2	–	9
Savannah State		–		1	–	8
Southern Utah		–		1	–	10
Morris Brown		–		1	–	11

The 2002 Samford Bulldogs football team represented Samford University as an independent during the 2002 NCAA Division I-AA football season. Led by second-year head coach Bill Gray, the Bulldogs compiled an overall record of 4–7. The team played home games at Seibert Stadium in Homewood, Alabama.

== Schedule ==
Date	Time	Opponent	Site	TV	Result	Attendance	Source
August 29	7:00 p.m.	North Alabama	Seibert Stadium; Homewood, AL		W 24–21 ^{2OT}	9,368	
September 7	6:00 p.m.	at Baylor	Floyd Casey Stadium; Waco, TX		L 12–50	28,375	
September 14	6:00 p.m.	Nicholls State	Seibert Stadium; Homewood, AL		L 17–45	3,648	
September 21	6:00 p.m.	Tennessee–Martin	Seibert Stadium; Homewood, AL		W 41–10	5,127	
October 5	7:00 p.m.	at Jacksonville State	Paul Snow Stadium; Jacksonville, AL (rivalry)	CSS-TV	L 23–37	8,425	
October 19	1:00 p.m.	Alcorn State	Seibert Stadium; Homewood, AL		W 35–25	6,742	
October 26	12:00 p.m.	at Morris Brown	Herndon Stadium; Atlanta, GA		W 20–7	11,906	
November 2	1:30 p.m.	at Murray State	Roy Stewart Stadium; Murray, KY		L 17–54	2,580	
November 9	1:00 p.m.	Tennessee Tech	Seibert Stadium; Homewood, AL		L 44–51		
November 16	6:00 p.m.	at Southeast Missouri State	Houck Stadium; Cape Girardeau, MO		L 24–48	4,375	
November 23	12:00 p.m.	at Youngstown State	Stambaugh Stadium; Youngstown, OH		L 29–37	11,658	
All times are in Central time
