= 2002 Northern Arizona Lumberjacks football team =

American college football season

2002 Northern Arizona Lumberjacks football
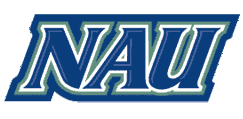
- Conference: Big Sky Conference
- Record: 6–5 (3–4 Big Sky)
- Head coach: Jerome Souers (5th season)
- Home stadium: Walkup Skydome

2002 Big Sky Conference football standings
	Conf.			Overall
Team	W		L	W		L
No. 7 Montana +^	5	–	2	11	–	3
No. 19 Montana State +^	5	–	2	7	–	6
No. 18 Idaho State +	5	–	2	8	–	3
Eastern Washington	3	–	4	6	–	5
Northern Arizona	3	–	4	6	–	5
Portland State	3	–	4	6	–	5
Sacramento State	3	–	4	5	–	8
Weber State	1	–	6	3	–	8
+ – Conference co-champions; ^ – NCAA Division I-AA playoff participant; Rankings from The Sports Network poll

The 2002 Northern Arizona Lumberjacks football team was an American football team that represented Northern Arizona University (NAU) as a member of the Big Sky Conference (Big Sky) during the 2002 NCAA Division I-AA football season. In their fifth year under head coach Jerome Souers, the Lumberjacks compiled a 6–5 record (3–4 against conference opponents), were outscored by a total of 284 to 252, and finished in a four-way tie for fourth place in the Big Sky.

The team played its home games at the J. Lawrence Walkup Skydome, commonly known as the Walkup Skydome, in Flagstaff, Arizona.

== Schedule ==
Date	Opponent	Rank	Site	Result	Attendance	Source
August 31	at Arizona*	No. 21	Arizona Stadium; Tucson, AZ	L 3–37	48,446	
September 7	at Cal Poly*		Mustang Stadium; San Luis Obispo, CA	W 31–24		
September 14	No. 14 Sam Houston State*		Walkup Skydome; Flagstaff, AZ	W 40–14	6,019	
September 28	No. 9 Portland State^{†}	No. 16	Walkup Skydome; Flagstaff, AZ	W 14–10	8,752	
October 5	Weber State	No. 12	Walkup Skydome; Flagstaff, AZ	W 26–21	5,439	
October 12	Sacramento State	No. 8	Walkup Skydome; Flagstaff, AZ	L 21–24	9,126	
October 19	at Eastern Washington	No. 16	Woodward Field; Cheney, WA	L 29–41	5,215	
October 26	Montana State		Walkup Skydome; Flagstaff, AZ	W 20–17	6,722	
November 2	at No. 1 Montana		Washington–Grizzly Stadium; Missoula, MT	L 24–38	19,276	
November 9	at No. 23 Idaho State		Holt Arena; Pocatello, ID	L 20–46	8,516	
November 16	at Saint Mary's*		Saint Mary's Stadium; Moraga, CA	W 24–12		
*Non-conference game; ^{†}Homecoming; Rankings from The Sports Network Poll released prior to the game
