= 2002 Idaho State Bengals football team =

American college football season

2002 Idaho State Bengals football

Big Sky co-champion
- Conference: Big Sky Conference

Ranking
- Sports Network: No. 18
- Record: 8–3 (5–2 Big Sky)
- Head coach: Larry Lewis (4th season)
- Offensive coordinator: Bruce Barnum (2nd season)
- Offensive scheme: Pro spread
- Defensive coordinator: James Ward (3rd season)
- Base defense: 4–3
- Home stadium: Holt Arena

2002 Big Sky Conference football standings
	Conf.			Overall
Team	W		L	W		L
No. 7 Montana +^	5	–	2	11	–	3
No. 19 Montana State +^	5	–	2	7	–	6
No. 18 Idaho State +	5	–	2	8	–	3
Eastern Washington	3	–	4	6	–	5
Northern Arizona	3	–	4	6	–	5
Portland State	3	–	4	6	–	5
Sacramento State	3	–	4	5	–	8
Weber State	1	–	6	3	–	8
+ – Conference co-champions; ^ – NCAA Division I-AA playoff participant; Rankings from The Sports Network poll

The 2002 Idaho State Bengals football team represented Idaho State University as a member of the Big Sky Conference during the 2002 NCAA Division I-AA football season. Led by fourth-year head coach Larry Lewis, the Bengals compiled an overall record of 8–3, with a mark of 5–2 in conference play, and finished as Big Sky co-champion. The team played home games at Holt Arena in Pocatello, Idaho.

== Schedule ==
Date	Opponent	Rank	Site	Result	Attendance	Source
August 29	Montana Western*		Holt Arena; Pocatello, ID	W 48–7		
September 14	at Utah State*		Romney Stadium; Logan, UT	L 33–38	16,231	
September 21	at No. 1 Montana		Washington–Grizzly Stadium; Missoula, MT	L 9–13	19,689	
September 28	Sacramento State		Holt Arena; Pocatello, ID	W 32–24		
October 5	at Eastern Washington		Woodward Field; Cheney, WA	W 21–14	4,556	
October 12	Montana State		Holt Arena; Pocatello, ID	W 18–14	9,727	
October 26	Weber State	No. 20	Holt Arena; Pocatello, ID	W 34–0	10,419	
November 2	at No. 15 Portland State	No. 19	PGE Park; Portland, OR	L 24–27	5,959	
November 9	Northern Arizona	No. 23	Holt Arena; Pocatello, ID	W 46–20	8,516	
November 16	Cal Poly*	No. 20	Holt Arena; Pocatello, ID	W 24–14		
November 23	at Southern Utah*	No. 18	Eccles Coliseum; Cedar City, UT	W 42–17		
*Non-conference game; Rankings from The Sports Network Poll released prior to the game
