= 2002 NCAA Division II football season =

American college football season

- Regular season: September 7 – November 16, 2002
- Playoffs: November 23 – December 14, 2002
- National Championship: Braly Municipal Stadium; Florence, AL
- Champion: Grand Valley State
- Harlon Hill Trophy: Curt Anes, Grand Valley State

The 2002 NCAA Division II football season, part of college football in the United States organized by the National Collegiate Athletic Association at the Division II level, began on September 7, 2002, and concluded with the NCAA Division II Football Championship on December 14, 2002, at Braly Municipal Stadium in Florence, Alabama, hosted by the University of North Alabama. The Grand Valley State Lakers defeated the Valdosta State Blazers, 31–24, to win their first Division II national title.

The Harlon Hill Trophy was awarded to Curt Anes, quarterback from Grand Valley State.

== Conference changes and new programs ==
School	2001 Conference	2002 Conference
Gardner-Webb	D-II Independent	Big South (I-AA)
Saint Augustine's	Program Revived	CIAA (D-II)
Savannah State	D-II Independent	I-AA Independent

== Conference standings ==
2002 Central Intercollegiate Athletic Association football standings
	Conf.			Overall
Team	W		L	W		L
Eastern Division
Bowie State xy	5	–	2	6	–	5
Virginia State	5	–	2	7	–	3
Virginia Union	4	–	3	6	–	4
Elizabeth City State	2	–	5	2	–	8
Western Division
No. 16 Fayetteville State xy$^	7	–	0	10	–	2
Winston-Salem State	4	–	3	4	–	6
North Carolina Central	2	–	5	4	–	6
Livingstone	2	–	5	3	–	7
Johnson C. Smith	1	–	7	2	–	8
St. Augustine's	0	–	7	0	–	8
Championship: Fayetteville State 17, Bowie State 14
$ – Conference champion; x – Division champion/co-champions; y – Championship game participant; ^ – NCAA Division II playoff participant; Rankings from AFCA poll

2002 Great Lakes Intercollegiate Athletic Conference football standings
	Conf.			Overall
Team	W		L	W		L
No. 1 Grand Valley State $^	9	–	0	14	–	0
No. 25 Findlay	8	–	2	9	–	2
No. 13 Saginaw Valley State ^	8	–	2	9	–	3
Northwood	7	–	3	7	–	4
Northern Michigan	6	–	4	6	–	5
Ferris State	4	–	5	5	–	5
Indianapolis	4	–	6	5	–	6
Hillsdale	4	–	6	4	–	7
Michigan Tech	3	–	7	3	–	7
Wayne State (MI)	3	–	7	3	–	8
Ashland	2	–	8	2	–	9
Mercyhurst	1	–	9	2	–	9
$ – Conference champion; ^ – NCAA Division II playoff participant; Rankings from AFCA poll

2002 Great Northwest Athletic Conference football standings
	Conf.			Overall
Team	W		L	W		L
No. 9 Central Washington $^	3	–	0	11	–	1
Western Washington	2	–	1	6	–	4
Western Oregon	1	–	2	5	–	5
Humboldt State	0	–	3	1	–	10
$ – Conference champion; ^ – NCAA Division II playoff participant; Rankings from AFCA poll

2002 Gulf South Conference football standings
	Conf.			Overall
Team	W		L	W		L
No. 2 Valdosta State $^	9	–	0	14	–	1
Harding	7	–	2	9	–	2
Central Arkansas	6	–	3	8	–	3
Southern Arkansas	6	–	3	7	–	4
Ouachita Baptist	5	–	4	5	–	5
Henderson State	5	–	4	5	–	6
Delta State	4	–	5	4	–	7
West Alabama	3	–	6	5	–	6
North Alabama	3	–	6	4	–	7
Arkansas Tech	3	–	6	4	–	7
Arkansas–Monticello	2	–	7	2	–	8
West Georgia	1	–	8	3	–	8
$ – Conference champion; ^ – NCAA Division II playoff participant; Rankings from AFCA poll

2002 Lone Star Conference football standings
	Conf.			Overall
Team	W		L	W		L
Overall*
No. 4 Texas A&M–Kingsville $^	7	–	1	10	–	3
No. 19 Tarleton State	6	–	2	9	–	2
Abilene Christian	6	–	2	6	–	4
Midwestern State	6	–	2	7	–	4
Eastern New Mexico	5	–	3	8	–	3
SE Oklahoma State	5	–	3	7	–	3
SW Oklahoma State	5	–	3	7	–	4
Central Oklahoma	4	–	4	5	–	6
East Central	3	–	5	3	–	8
Northeastern State	2	–	6	4	–	7
Angelo State	2	–	6	2	–	8
Texas A&M–Commerce	2	–	6	2	–	8
West Texas A&M	0	–	8	0	–	11
North Division
No. 19 Tarleton State x	4	–	1	9	–	2
SE Oklahoma State	3	–	2	7	–	3
SW Oklahoma State	3	–	2	7	–	4
Central Oklahoma	2	–	3	5	–	6
East Central	2	–	3	3	–	8
Northeastern State	1	–	4	4	–	7
South Division
No. 4 Texas A&M–Kingsville $^	5	–	1	10	–	3
Abilene Christian x	5	–	1	6	–	4
Eastern New Mexico	4	–	2	8	–	3
Midwestern State	4	–	2	7	–	4
Angelo State	2	–	4	2	–	8
Texas A&M–Commerce	1	–	5	2	–	8
West Texas A&M	0	–	6	0	–	11
$ – Conference champion; ^ – NCAA Division II playoff participant; * – The LSC counted separate overall and division standings.; Rankings from AFCA poll

2002 Mid-America Intercollegiate Athletics Association football standings
	Conf.			Overall
Team	W		L	W		L
No. 6 NW Missouri State $^	9	–	0	12	–	1
No. 10 Central Missouri State ^	8	–	1	10	–	2
Emporia State	6	–	3	9	–	3
No. 21 Pittsburg State	6	–	3	8	–	3
Missouri Western	4	–	5	6	–	5
Truman	3	–	6	5	–	6
Missouri Southern	3	–	6	5	–	6
Washburn	3	–	6	3	–	8
Southwest Baptist	2	–	7	3	–	8
Missouri–Rolla	0	–	9	0	–	11
$ – Conference champion; ^ – NCAA Division II playoff participant; Rankings from AFCA poll

2002 North Central Conference football standings
	Conf.			Overall
Team	W		L	W		L
No. 3 Northern Colorado $^	8	–	0	12	–	2
No. 18 St. Cloud State	6	–	2	9	–	2
Nebraska–Omaha	5	–	3	6	–	5
Augustana (SD)	4	–	4	7	–	4
South Dakota State	4	–	4	6	–	4
North Dakota	3	–	5	5	–	6
Minnesota State	3	–	5	4	–	7
South Dakota	2	–	6	3	–	8
North Dakota State	1	–	7	2	–	8
$ – Conference champion; ^ – NCAA Division II playoff participant; Rankings from AFCA poll

2002 Northeast-10 Conference football standings
	Conf.			Overall
Team	W		L	W		L
No. 17 C. W. Post $^	10	–	1	11	–	1
No. 23 Bentley	9	–	1	10	–	1
Southern Connecticut	7	–	3	8	–	3
Merrimack	6	–	4	6	–	4
Saint Anselm	5	–	5	5	–	5
American International	5	–	5	5	–	6
Bryant	5	–	5	5	–	6
Pace	3	–	7	3	–	7
UMass Lowell	3	–	7	3	–	8
Assumption	1	–	9	2	–	9
Stonehill	1	–	9	2	–	9
$ – Conference champion; ^ – NCAA Division II playoff participant; Rankings from AFCA poll

2002 Northern Sun Intercollegiate Conference football standings
	Conf.			Overall
Team	W		L	W		L
No. 11 Minnesota Duluth $^	9	–	0	11	–	1
Winona State	8	–	1	8	–	4
Concordia–St. Paul	7	–	2	9	–	2
Bemidji State	6	–	3	6	–	5
Minnesota State–Moorhead	4	–	5	5	–	5
Northern State	4	–	5	4	–	7
Southwest State (MN)	3	–	6	4	–	7
Wayne State (NE)	3	–	6	3	–	8
Minnesota–Crookston	1	–	8	1	–	10
Minnesota Morris	0	–	9	0	–	11
$ – Conference champion; ^ – NCAA Division II playoff participant; Rankings from AFCA poll

2002 Pennsylvania State Athletic Conference football standings
	Conf.			Overall
Team	W		L	W		L
East Division
No. 22 Bloomsburg x	5	–	1	8	–	2
No. 24 East Stroudsburg x	5	–	1	8	–	2
West Chester	4	–	2	5	–	6
Millersville	3	–	3	3	–	7
Kutztown	2	–	4	4	–	7
Mansfield	2	–	4	3	–	7
Cheyney	0	–	6	0	–	11
West Division
No. 8 IUP x^	6	–	0	11	–	2
Slippery Rock	4	–	2	7	–	4
Shippensburg	4	–	2	6	–	5
Clarion	3	–	3	7	–	4
Edinboro	2	–	4	5	–	6
California (PA)	1	–	5	6	–	5
Lock Haven	1	–	5	4	–	7
x – Division champion/co-champions; ^ – NCAA Division II playoff participant; Rankings from AFCA poll

2002 Rocky Mountain Athletic Conference football standings
	Conf.			Overall
Team	W		L	W		L
No. 12 Nebraska–Kearney +^	7	–	1	9	–	2
No. 20 Chadron State +	7	–	1	8	–	2
Mesa State	5	–	3	5	–	6
Colorado Mines	4	–	4	7	–	4
Adams State	4	–	4	5	–	6
Western State (CO)	4	–	4	5	–	6
Fort Hays State	3	–	5	5	–	6
Fort Lewis	2	–	6	3	–	8
New Mexico Highlands	0	–	8	0	–	10
+ – Conference co-champions; ^ – NCAA Division II playoff participant; Rankings from AFCA poll

2002 South Atlantic Conference football standings
	Conf.			Overall
Team	W		L	W		L
No. 5 Carson–Newman $^	7	–	0	12	–	1
No. 15 Catawba ^	6	–	1	8	–	3
Presbyterian	5	–	2	8	–	3
Mars Hill	4	–	3	7	–	4
Tusculum	3	–	4	7	–	4
Wingate	2	–	5	5	–	6
Lenoir–Rhyne	1	–	6	3	–	7
Newberry	0	–	7	1	–	10
$ – Conference champion; ^ – NCAA Division II playoff participant; Rankings from AFCA poll

2002 Southern Intercollegiate Athletic Conference football standings
	Conf.			Overall
Team	W		L	W		L
No. 14 Tuskegee $	7	–	1	10	–	1
Albany State	6	–	2	7	–	4
Fort Valley State	6	–	2	7	–	4
Miles	5	–	3	6	–	5
Morehouse	4	–	4	6	–	5
Lane	3	–	5	4	–	7
Kentucky State	2	–	6	3	–	8
Benedict	2	–	6	2	–	9
Clark Atlanta	1	–	7	2	–	9
$ – Conference champion; Rankings from AFCA poll

2002 West Virginia Intercollegiate Athletic Conference football standings
	Conf.			Overall
Team	W		L	W		L
West Virginia Wesleyan $	6	–	1	7	–	4
Shepherd	5	–	2	7	–	3
West Liberty State	5	–	2	6	–	5
West Virginia Tech	5	–	2	6	–	5
Glenville State	3	–	4	4	–	7
Fairmont State	2	–	5	3	–	7
Concord	2	–	5	3	–	8
West Virginia State	0	–	7	1	–	10
$ – Conference champion

2002 NCAA Division II independents football records
	Conf.			Overall
Team	W		L	W		L
No. 7 UC Davis ^		–		9	–	3
Gannon		–		5	–	5
New Haven		–		4	–	6
Quincy		–		4	–	7
Saint Joseph's (IN)		–		4	–	7
Western New Mexico		–		2	–	7
Oklahoma Panhandle State		–		2	–	9
Kentucky Wesleyan		–		1	–	10
^ – NCAA Division II playoff participant; Rankings from AFCA poll

== Conference summaries ==
Conference Champions

Central Intercollegiate Athletic Association – Fayetteville State
Great Lakes Intercollegiate Athletic Conference – Grand Valley State
Great Northwest Athletic Conference – Central Washington
Gulf South Conference – Valdosta State
Lone Star Conference – Texas A&M–Kingsville
Mid-America Intercollegiate Athletics Association – Northwest Missouri State
North Central Conference – Northern Colorado
Northeast-10 Conference – C.W. Post
Northern Sun Intercollegiate Conference – Minnesota–Duluth
Pennsylvania State Athletic Conference – Bloomsburg and East Stroudsburg (East), Indiana (PA) (West)
Rocky Mountain Athletic Conference – Chadron State and Nebraska–Kearney
South Atlantic Conference – Carson-Newman
Southern Intercollegiate Athletic Conference – Tuskegee
West Virginia Intercollegiate Athletic Conference – West Virginia Wesleyan

== Postseason ==
2002 NCAA Division II Football Championship
- Teams: 16
- Finals Site: Braly Municipal Stadium; Florence, AL
- Champion: Grand Valley State; (1st title, title game)
- Runner-up: Valdosta State; (1st title game)
- Semifinalists: Texas A&M–Kingsville; Northern Colorado
- Winning coach: championship

The 2002 NCAA Division II Football Championship playoffs were the 29th single-elimination tournament to determine the national champion of men's NCAA Division II college football. The championship game was held at Braly Municipal Stadium in Florence, Alabama for the 15th time.

=== Playoff bracket ===
First round Campus sites
Valdosta State	24
Catawba	7
Carson–Newman	40
Fayetteville State	27
UC Davis	24
Central Washington	6
Texas A&M–Kingsville	58
Nebraska–Kearney	40
Grand Valley State	62
C.W. Post	13
IUP	27
Saginaw Valley State	23
NW Missouri State	45
Minnesota–Duluth	41
Northern Colorado	49
Central Missouri State	28

Quarterfinals; Campus sites
Valdosta State	31
Carson–Newman	28
UC Davis	20
Texas A&M–Kingsville	27*
Grand Valley State	62
IUP	21
Northwest Missouri State	12
Northern Colorado	23

Semifinals; Campus sites
Valdosta State	21
Texas A&M–Kingsville	12
Grand Valley State	44
Northern Colorado	7

Championship; Braly Municipal Stadium; Florence, AL
Valdosta State	24
Grand Valley State	31

== See also ==
- 2002 NCAA Division I-A football season
- 2002 NCAA Division I-AA football season
- 2002 NCAA Division III football season
- 2002 NAIA football season
