= Luther "Nick" Jeralds Stadium =

Stadium in North Carolina, USA

Coordinates: 35.075369°N 78.896620°W

- Interactive map of Luther "Nick" Jeralds Stadium
- Full name: Luther "Nick" Jeralds Stadium
- Location: Fayetteville, North Carolina
- Owner: Fayetteville State University
- Capacity: 5,520
- Surface: AstroTurf

Construction
- Built: 2003

Tenant
- Fayetteville State Broncos

Luther "Nick" Jeralds Stadium is a 5,520-seat college football stadium located in Fayetteville, North Carolina. The Stadium is home to the Broncos of Fayetteville State University. They compete in the National Collegiate Athletic Association (NCAA) Division II Central Intercollegiate Athletic Association (CIAA).
