= 2002 Montana Grizzlies football team =

American college football season

2002 Montana Grizzlies football

Big Sky co-champion

NCAA Division I-AA Quarterfinal, L 20–24 at McNeese State
- Conference: Big Sky Conference

Ranking
- Sports Network: No. 7
- Record: 11–3 (5–2 Big Sky)
- Head coach: Joe Glenn (3rd season)
- Home stadium: Washington–Grizzly Stadium

2002 Big Sky Conference football standings
	Conf.			Overall
Team	W		L	W		L
No. 7 Montana +^	5	–	2	11	–	3
No. 19 Montana State +^	5	–	2	7	–	6
No. 18 Idaho State +	5	–	2	8	–	3
Eastern Washington	3	–	4	6	–	5
Northern Arizona	3	–	4	6	–	5
Portland State	3	–	4	6	–	5
Sacramento State	3	–	4	5	–	8
Weber State	1	–	6	3	–	8
+ – Conference co-champions; ^ – NCAA Division I-AA playoff participant; Rankings from The Sports Network poll

The 2002 Montana Grizzlies football team represented the University of Montana as a member of the Big Sky Conference during the 2002 NCAA Division I-AA football season. Led by third-year head coach Joe Glenn, the Grizzlies compiled an overall record of 11–3, with a mark of 5–2 in conference play, and finished as Big Sky co-champion. Montana advanced to the NCAA Division I-AA Football Championship playoffs, where the Grizzlies defeated Northwestern State in the first round and lost to McNeese State in the quarterfinals. The team played home games at Washington–Grizzly Stadium in Missoula, Montana.

== Schedule ==
Date	Time	Opponent	Rank	Site	TV	Result	Attendance	Source
August 29	4:00 pm	at No. 15 Hofstra*	No. 1	James M. Shuart Stadium; Hempstead, NY	MTN	W 21–0	5,107	
September 7	1:00 pm	Albany*	No. 1	Washington–Grizzly Stadium; Missoula, MT	MTN	W 45–7	19,511	
September 14	1:00 pm	Northern Colorado*	No. 1	Washington–Grizzly Stadium; Missoula, MT	MTN	W 31–14	19,236	
September 21	1:00 pm	Idaho State	No. 1	Washington–Grizzly Stadium; Missoula, MT	MTN	W 13–9	19,689	
October 5	1:00 pm	at Idaho*	No. 1	Kibbie Dome; Moscow, ID (Little Brown Stein)		W 38–31	14,047	
October 12	6:00 pm	at Weber State	No. 1	Stewart Stadium; Ogden, UT	MTN	W 39–7	13,383	
October 19	1:00 pm	Southern Utah*	No. 1	Washington–Grizzly Stadium; Missoula, MT	MTN	W 68–45	19,681	
October 26	7:00 pm	at No. 13 Portland State	No. 1	PGE Park; Portland, OR	MTN	W 24–21	12,733	
November 2	12:00 pm	Northern Arizona	No. 1	Washington–Grizzly Stadium; Missoula, MT	MTN	W 38–24	19,276	
November 9	12:00 pm	Sacramento State	No. 1	Washington–Grizzly Stadium; Missoula, MT	MTN	W 31–24	19,174	
November 16	3:00 pm	at Eastern Washington	No. 1	Joe Albi Stadium; Spokane, WA (EWU–UM Governors Cup)	MTN	L 21–30	17,142	
November 23	12:00 pm	Montana State	No. 4	Washington–Grizzly Stadium; Missoula, MT (rivalry)	MTN	L 7–10	19,879	
November 30	12:00 pm	No. 13 Northwestern State*	No. 9	Washington–Grizzly Stadium; Missoula, MT (NCAA Division I-AA First Round)	MTN	W 45–14	15,758	
December 7	7:00 pm	No. 1 McNeese State*	No. 9	Cowboy Stadium; Lake Charles, LA (NCAA Division I-AA Quarterfinal)	MTN	L 20–24	15,758	
*Non-conference game; Rankings from The Sports Network Poll released prior to the game; All times are in Mountain time

== Roster ==
2002 Montana Grizzlies football team roster
Players
Coaches
Offense

Pos.	#	Name	Class
WR	85	Randyn Akiona	Fr
OT	64	Dylan Brown	So
QB	5	John Edwards	Sr
C	65	Garth Enger	So
OT	74	Beau Hart	So
OT	72	Dylan McFarland	Jr
QB	16	Brandon Neill	Sr
OT	75	Cory Procter	So
OT	76	Brad Rhoades	Fr
OT	77	Jon Skinner	Jr
WR	81	Rory Zikmund	Sr

Defense

Pos.	#	Name	Class
FS	4	David DeCoite	Jr
DT	90	Curt Colter	Sr
DE	97	Herbert Fernandez	Sr
CB	33	Joel Rosenburg	Sr
DT	99	Alan Saenz	So
CB	11	Vernon Smith	Jr
SS	3	Trey Young	Sr

Special teams

Pos.	#	Name	Class

Head coach

- Joe Glenn

Coordinators/assistant coaches

Legend

- (C) Team captain
- (S) Suspended
- (I) Ineligible
- Injured
- Redshirt

Roster
