= 2002 NCAA Division II football rankings =

The 2002 NCAA Division II football rankings are from the American Football Coaches Association (AFCA). This is for the 2002 season.

== Legend ==
	Increase in ranking
	Decrease in ranking
	Not ranked previous week
(#–#)	Win–loss record
(Italics)	Number of first place votes
т	Tied with team above or below also with this symbol

== American Football Coaches Association poll ==
	Preseason (Note: Although one was published, no preseason poll has been found. 23 of the 25 rankings are known, based on the first regular season poll.)	Week 1 Sept 3	Week 2 Sept 10	Week 3 Sept 17	Week 4 Sept 24	Week 5 Oct 1	Week 6 Oct 8	Week 7 Oct 15	Week 8 Oct 22	Week 9 Oct 29	Week 10 Nov 5	Week 11 Nov 12	
1.	Grand Valley State	Grand Valley State (0–0) (21)	Grand Valley State (1–0) (27)	Grand Valley State (1–0) (27)	Grand Valley State (2–0) (26)	Grand Valley State (3–0) (26)	Grand Valley State (4–0) (26)	Grand Valley State (5–0) (27)	Grand Valley State (6–0) (27)	Grand Valley State (7–0) (27)	Grand Valley State (8–0) (27)	Grand Valley State (9–0) (26)	1.
2.	North Dakota	North Dakota (1–0) (6)	Valdosta State (2–0)	Valdosta State (2–0)	Valdosta State (3–0)	Valdosta State (4–0)	Valdosta State (5–0)	Valdosta State (6–0)	Valdosta State (7–0)	Valdosta State (8–0)	Valdosta State (9–0)	Valdosta State (10–0) (1)	2.
3.	Valdosta State	Valdosta State (1–0)	Pittsburg State (1–0)	Pittsburg State (2–0)	Pittsburg State (3–0)	Pittsburg State (4–0)	Pittsburg State (5–0)	Saginaw Valley State (6–0)	Carson–Newman (7–0)	Carson–Newman (8–0)	Carson–Newman (9–0)	Carson–Newman (10–0)	3.
4.	Pittsburg State	Pittsburg State (1–0)	Saginaw Valley State (1–0)	Saginaw Valley State (2–0)	Saginaw Valley State (3–0)	Saginaw Valley State (4–0)	Saginaw Valley State (5–0)	Carson–Newman (6–0)	Northwest Missouri State (7–0)	Northwest Missouri State (8–0)	Northwest Missouri State (9–0)	Northwest Missouri State (10–0)	4.
5.	Texas A&M–Kingsville	Texas A&M–Kingsville (0–0)	Carson–Newman (2–0)	Carson–Newman (3–0)	Carson–Newman (4–0)	Carson–Newman (4–0)	Carson–Newman (5–0)	Northwest Missouri State (6–0)	UC Davis (5–1)	UC Davis (6–1)	UC Davis (7–1)	Central Washington (11–0)	5.
6.	UC Davis	UC Davis (0–0)	Tarleton State (2–0)	Tarleton State (3–0)	Tarleton State (4–0)	Northwest Missouri State (4–0)	Northwest Missouri State (5–0)	UC Davis (4–1)	Central Missouri (7–0)	Central Missouri (8–0)	Central Washington (10–0)	IUP (10–1)	6.
7.	IUP (Note: In the actual printed polls, IUP was listed as Indiana (PA))	Carson–Newman (1–0)	Tuskegee (2–0)	Northwest Missouri State (2–0)	Northwest Missouri State (3–0)	Central Arkansas (4–0)	Central Arkansas (5–0)	Texas A&M–Kingsville (4–1)	Texas A&M–Kingsville (5–1)	Central Washington (9–0)	IUP (9–1)	Northern Colorado (9–1)	7.
8.	Carson–Newman	Saginaw Valley State (0–0)	Catawba (1–0)	Tuskegee (3–0)	Tuskegee (4–0) (1)	Tuskegee (4–0) (1)	Tuskegee (4–1) (1)	Central Missouri (6–0)	Central Washington (8–0)	Texas A&M–Kingsville (6–1)	Northern Colorado (8–1)	Central Missouri (9–1)	8.
9.	Saginaw Valley State	Bloomsburg (0–0)	Northwest Missouri State (1–0)	Central Arkansas (2–0)	Central Arkansas (3–0)	UC Davis (3–1)	UC Davis (3–1)	Central Washington (7–0)	Saginaw Valley State (6–1)	IUP (8–1)	Catawba (7–1)	Tuskegee (9–1)	9.
10.	Bloomsburg	Tarleton State (1–0)	Chadron State (1–0)	UC Davis (1–1)	UC Davis (2–1)	Texas A&M–Kingsville (2–1)	Texas A&M–Kingsville (5–0)	IUP (6–1)	IUP (7–1)	Catawba (6–1)	Tuskegee (8–1)	C.W. Post (10–0)	10.
11.	Nebraska–Omaha	Tuskegee (1–0)	UC Davis (0–1)	Nebraska–Kearney (2–0)	Tusculum (4–0)	Tusculum (4–0)	Tusculum (5–0)	Pittsburg State (5–1)	Tarleton State (6–1)	Northern Colorado (7–1)	Central Missouri (8–1)	Minnesota–Duluth (10–0)	11.
12.	Tarleton State	Catawba (0–0)	Central Arkansas (1–0)	Texas A&M–Kingsville (1–1)	Texas A&M–Kingsville (1–1)	Central Missouri (4–0)	Central Missouri (6–0)	Tarleton State (5–1)	Catawba (5–1)	Tuskegee (7–1)	C.W. Post (9–0)	Nebraska–Kearney (9–1)	12.
13.	Tuskegee	Chadron State (0–0)	Nebraska–Kearney (2–0)	Tusculum (3–0)	Central Missouri (3–0)	IUP (4–1)	Central Washington (5–1)	Catawba (4–1)	Northern Colorado (6–1)	C.W. Post (8–0)	Nebraska–Kearney (8–1)	Pittsburg State (8–2)	13.
14.	Chadron State	Northwest Missouri State (0–0)	Texas A&M–Kingsville (0–1)	Central Missouri (2–0)	IUP (3–1)	Central Washington (5–0)	IUP (4–0)	Central Arkansas (5–1)	C.W. Post (7–0)	Nebraska–Kearney (7–1)	Minnesota–Duluth (9–0)	UC Davis (7–2)	14.
15.	Catawba	Central Arkansas (0–0)	Tusculum (2–0)	IUP (2–1)	Western Washington (2–0)	Western Washington (3–0)	Western Washington (5–1)	C.W. Post (6–0)	Tuskegee (6–1)	Minnesota–Duluth (8–0)	Pittsburg State (7–2)	Saginaw Valley State (8–2)	15.
16.	Northwest Missouri State	Nebraska–Kearney (1–0)	Central Missouri (1–0)	North Dakota (2–1)	Central Washington (4–0)	C.W. Post (4–0)	Tarleton State (5–1)	Northern Colorado (5–1)	Nebraska–Kearney (6–1)	Emporia State (7–1)	Saginaw Valley State (7–2)	Fayetteville State (9–1)	16.
17.	Central Arkansas	Tusculum (1–0)	C.W. Post (1–0)	Western Washington (2–0)	C.W. Post (3–0)	Catawba (2–1)	Catawba (3–1)	Tuskegee (5–1)	Tusculum (6–1)	Pittsburg State (6–2)	Tarleton State (6–2)	Tarleton State (7–2)	17.
18.		Central Missouri (1–0)	IUP (1–1)	C.W. Post (2–0)	Catawba (2–1)	Tarleton State (4–1)	C.W. Post (5–0)	Harding (6–0)	Minnesota–Duluth (7–0)	Saginaw Valley State (6–2)	Fayetteville State (8–1)	Catawba (7–2)	18.
19.		C.W. Post (0–0)	North Dakota (1–1)	Catawba (1–1)	Northern Colorado (2–1)	Northern Colorado (3–1)	Northern Colorado (4–1)	Chadron State (5–1)	East Stroudsburg (5–1)	Harding (7–1)	Texas A&M–Kingsville (6–2)	Findlay (9–1)	19.
20.	C.W. Post	Shepherd (0–0)	Western Washington (1–0)	Central Washington (3–0)	Bloomsburg (2–1)	Bloomsburg (3–1)	Findlay (5–0)	Nebraska–Kearney (5–1)	Pittsburg State (5–2)	Tarleton State (6–2)	Findlay (8–1)	Texas A&M–Kingsville (7–2)	20.
21.	Tusculum	Fort Valley State (1–0)	Shepherd (1–0)	Shepherd (2–0)	Chadron State (2–1)	Chadron State (3–1)	Chadron State (4–1)	Tusculum (5–1)	St. Cloud State (6–1)	Fayetteville State (7–1)	Bentley (9–0)	St. Cloud State (8–2)	21.
22.	Shepherd	IUP (0–1)	Central Washington (2–0)	Missouri Western State (2–0)	Nebraska–Kearney (2–1)	Findlay (4–0)	Harding (5–0)	East Stroudsburg (5–1)	Emporia State (6–1)	Bentley (8–0)	Chadron State (7–2)	Chadron State (7–2)	22.
23.	Central Missouri	Nebraska–Omaha (0–1)	Northern Colorado (1–0)	Bloomsburg (1–1)	Findlay (3–0)	Nebraska–Kearney (3–1)	Nebraska–Kearney (4–1)	Western Washington (4–1)	Central Arkansas (5–2)	Findlay (7–1)	Emporia State (7–2)	Emporia State (8–2)	23.
24.	Fort Valley State	Western Washington (0–0)	Bloomsburg (0–1)	Chadron State (1–1)	Harding (3–0)	Harding (4–0)	East Stroudsburg (4–1)	Minnesota–Duluth (6–0)	Harding (6–1)	Tusculum (6–2)	Southern Arkansas (7–2)	Bentley (9–1)	24.
25.	Nebraska–Kearney	Northern Colorado (0–0)	Missouri Western State (2–0)	Northern Colorado (1–1)	Fort Valley State (3–1)	Eastern New Mexico (4–0)	St. Cloud State (5–0)	North Dakota (4–2)	Bentley (7–0) т	Chadron State (6–2)	St. Cloud State (7–2)	Eastern New Mexico (8–2)	25.
26.									Fayetteville State (6–1) т				26.
	Preseason (Note: Although one was published, no preseason poll has been found. 23 of the 25 rankings are known, based on the first regular season poll.)	Week 1 Sept 3	Week 2 Sept 10	Week 3 Sept 17	Week 4 Sept 24	Week 5 Oct 1	Week 6 Oct 8	Week 7 Oct 15	Week 8 Oct 22	Week 9 Oct 29	Week 10 Nov 5	Week 11 Nov 12	
		Dropped: 18; 19	Dropped: 21 Fort Valley State; 23 Nebraska–Omaha	None	Dropped: 16 North Dakota; 21 Shepherd; 22 Missouri Western State	Dropped: 25 Fort Valley State	Dropped: 20 Bloomsburg; 25 Eastern New Mexico	Dropped: 20 Findlay; 25 St. Cloud State	Dropped: 19 Chadron State; 23 Western Washington; 25 North Dakota	Dropped: 19 East Stroudsburg; 21 St. Cloud State; 23 Central Arkansas	Dropped: 19 Harding; 24 Tusculum	Dropped: 24 Southern Arkansas	
